= Viper's Drag =

1930 stride piano song by Fats Waller

"Viper's Drag" is a stride piano composition by the jazz pianist, composer, and arranger Thomas "Fats" Waller.

== History/background ==
"Viper's Drag" was written as a dance tune for a ragtime dance called a slow drag, often shortened to "drag" by songwriters of the day.

The song has been performed by Waller and countless other jazz artists, including Cab Calloway, who recorded a big band swing version of the tune on November 12, 1930 as song 10246-1 on the DOMINO label, album 4686 and Judy Carmichael, who recorded it for her Grammy award-nominated Two-Handed Stride on the Progressive label in 1980.

There are two versions by New Orleans piano masters Henry Butler and Allen Toussaint. It is the title cut to an album by Henry Butler/Steven Bernstein and the Hot 9, on Impulse (2014). It can also be found on "American Tunes"—the final recording from New Orleans jazz and R&B pianist Allen Toussaint, released on Nonesuch Records on June 10, 2016.

== Appears on ==
"Viper's Drag" appears on the following recordings:

- Fats Waller Memorial, Vol. 1, Fats Waller, RCA Victor, 1970, 2:48
- Fats Waller: Legendary Performer, Fats Waller, RCA, 1978
- You Rascal You, Fats Waller Pegasus/Pinnacle, 1986
- The Joint Is Jumpin', Fats Waller RCA Bluebird/BMG, 1987, 2:58
- The Definitive Fats Waller, Vol. 1: His Piano, His Rhythm, Fats Waller, 1990, 2:25
- Turn on the Heat: The Fats Waller Piano Solos, Fats Waller, RCA, 1991, 2:56
- A Handful of Fats: Original 1929-1942 Recordings, Fats Waller, Naxos Jazz/ Pro-Arte Records, 1992, 2:59
- The Cream Series, Fats Waller, Pearl, 1993, 3:01
- 1934-1935 Fats Waller, Fats Waller, 1993,
- The Indispensable Fats Waller, Vols. 1-2: 1926-1935, Fats Waller BMG, 1995,
- Ain't Misbehavin', Fats Waller, ASV/Living Era, 1995, 3:07
- ...Misbehavin', Fats Waller, RCA Camden, 1997, 2:59
- Fats Waller: Members Edition, Fats Waller, Membran, 1997,
- Piano Masterworks, Vol. 2 (1929-1943), Fats Waller EPM, 1997, 2:58
- A Portrait of Boogie Woogie Piano, Various artists, Gallerie, 1998, 2:57
- Masters of Jazz, Fats Waller, Cee-Dee, 1999,
- A Handful of Keys, Fats Waller, Proper / Proper Box, 1999, 3:00
- The Very Best of Fats Waller, Fats Waller, Collectors' Choice Music, 2000, 2:58
- Cradle of Jazz, Various artists, Tokuma, 2001, 2:57
- Fats Waller: Jazz Indispensable, Fats Waller, BMG, 2001,
- Associated Transcription Sessions, 1935-1939, Fats Waller, Jazz Unlimited, 2001, 2:26
- The Quintessence New York - Camden - Los Angeles: 1929-1943, Fats Waller, Frémeaux & Associés, 2002, 2:58
- Portrait, Vol. 1, Fats Waller, Documents Classics / The International Music Co., 2003, 2:58
- Totally Jazz Piano, Various artists, Pastels, 2003, 3:01
- Alligator Crawl, Fats Waller Universal Division Jazz, 2004, 2:58
- Fats Waller Stomp/Fractious Fingering, Fats Waller, Classic Jazz Music, 2004, 2:58
- Honeysuckle Rose ASV/Living Era, 2004, 2:58
- Happy Birthday Fats, Fats Waller, Fuel 2000, 2004, 2:23
- Truckin', Fats Waller, Proper Sales & Dist., 2004, 3:00
- The Best of Fats Waller: Jazz Forever, Fats Waller, Jazz Forever, 2005, 2:57
- Two-Handed Stride, Judy Carmichael, Progressive, 1980
- If You Got to Ask, You Ain't Got It!, Fats Waller, Bluebird/Legacy, 2006, 2:58
- An Introduction to Fats Waller, Fats Waller, Fuel 2000, 2006, 2:23
- Complete Victor Piano Solos, Fats Waller, Definitive Classics, 2006, 2:58
- RCA Original Masters: The Best of Fats Waller, Fats Waller Sony BMG, 2008, 2:58
- Best of Fats Waller (Box Set), Fats Waller, Sony BMG, 2008, 2:58
- Royal Casino, Various artists, Makin Friends, 2008,
- Performance: Radio Recordings from 1931 to 1943, Fats Waller Fuel 2000 / Varèse Sarabande, 2010, 2:23
- Fats Waller: 75 Original Great Performances, Fats Waller, Gralin Music, 2010, 2:54
- Fats Waller Anthology, Fats Waller, Jazzland, 2010, 2:57
- Believe in Miracles, Fats Waller, History, 2010, 2:57
- Fats Waller Piano Solos (1929-1941), Fats Waller, Jazz Tribune, 2010,
- Reefer Blues: Vintage Songs About Marijuana, Vol. 2, Various artists, Grammercy Records, 2010, 2:57
- Jazz Piano Masters: 55 Famous Jazz Songs, Various artists, Jazzland, 2010, 2:57
- Sex and Drugs and Rock and Roll, Various artists, Delta, 2010, 3:02
- The Ultimate Jazz Archive, Vol. 18, Various artists, 2010, 2:56
- The Ultimate Fats Waller Collection'', Vol. 4 AP, Various artists, 2010, 3:08
- Viper's Drag, Henry Butler/Steven Bernstein and the Hot 9, on Impulse (2014) 6:46
- American Tunes, Allen Toussaint, 2016, (Nonesuch) 3:18
