= Slow drag (dance) =

Ragtime jazz musical form and dance

The slow drag is an American ragtime jazz musical form and the social dance for which the music was written. It has been resurrected as part of blues dancing. Music written for the dance is often short-handed into the song title as a "Drag".

== History ==
Slow drag or "drag" has a history both in the music written for the dance, and the dance itself. The music has endured in many jazz standards, while the dance as it was originally performed has all but faded from modern performance.

=== In music ===
Ragtime composers, including Scott Joplin, Fats Waller, Jelly Roll Morton and others, wrote a number of slow-tempo tunes appropriate for the dance.

Slow drag music originated in the late 1800s. "The Dream" (c. 1880) is one of the earliest slow drag numbers. Originating in a brothel, it was called "Spanish" because its beat contained elements of tango or habanera music. A cornetist who played during the 1890s described the music where the slow drag was done, in the "less fashionable groups in town", as "more raggy" than the music that was played for the more "high-toned" dances. Slow drag was one of ten dance themes Joplin included in his composition "The Ragtime Dance," written in 1899 and published in 1902. "The Ragtime Dance" features a vocal introduction followed by a series of dance themes introduced by a vocalist.

Another Joplin composition, written with Scott Hayden, is "Sun Flower Slow drag", written in 1901. Sheet music published in 1906 juxtaposes rural blacks with the music in "The Watermelon Trust; A slow drag" written by Harry Thompson. "A down home shout; Characteristic slow-drag two step" by Herman Carle was published in 1907.

Fats Waller recorded "Viper's Drag", a popular slow drag song of its day that was a slow-tempo stride piano tune, which has been played by practitioners of the art of stride over the decades. It was revived for the Grammy-nominated 1980 Progressive Records album, Two Handed Stride, by the modern stride pianist, Judy Carmichael.

In the late 1930s, jazz bandleader Jelly Roll Morton recorded several "slow drag" ragtime arrangements with Creole elements. They were considered out of fashion by his contemporaries, but retain some musical interest for music historians with their Caribbean rhythms.

=== In dance ===
The slow drag is an intimate couples' dance. Partners embrace closely and sway to the beat of the music, moving their hips, but with little movement around the dance floor. One commentator described how couples "would just hang onto each other and just grind back and forth in one spot all night".

In the decades that followed its introduction in the late 1800s, the dance spread throughout the American South and was most popular in semi-rural juke joints, where it was danced to the blues. Buster Pickens, who was born in 1916, described people doing the slow drag to "slow low-down dirty blues" in barrelhouse joints. In 1929, the slow drag became the first African American social dance to be introduced to Broadway audiences, in the play Harlem. When first introduced on stage, it scandalized white critics with its raw sensuality, which was seen as an unseemly reflection of black sexuality.

Due to its intimacy, the dance was sometimes used to announce a special relationship between the couples who danced it, as it was too intimate to perform it with a casual partner.

Scott Joplin included a slow drag in his opera Treemonisha, providing choreography as follows:

1. The Slow drag must begin on the first beat of each measure.
2. When moving forward, drag the left foot; when moving backward, drag the right foot.
3. When moving sideways to the right, drag the left foot; when moving sideways to the left, drag the right foot.
4. When prancing, your steps must come on each beat of the measure.
5. When marching, and when sliding, your steps must come on the first and third beat of each measure.
6. Hop and skip on second beat of measure. Double the schottische step to fit the slow music.

Beyond the dragging of feet, Joplin's description has little in common with other descriptions of slow drag.

The "cling and sway" characteristic of the slow drag reappeared in the 1960s, and remains popular today as a basic romantic dance for couples. In these cases it is referred to as "slow dancing".

Slow drag enjoyed popularity in African American communities for many decades. For the most part, it did not garner popularity beyond these communities, unlike other dances from African-American communities, such as the Charleston. Few films of the dance survive; it can be seen as danced by Bessie Smith and her partner towards the end of the short film St. Louis Blues. The swing revival helped renew interest in the slow drag. A version of the slow drag is taught today in blues dancing.
