= Funky Butt =

Funky Butt may refer to:

- Funky Butt (band), a Norwegian jazz band
- Funky Butt (dance), a blues dance
- "Funky Butt" (song), an early ragtime song associated with Buddy Bolden
- Funky Butt (album), a 1981 album by jazz saxophonist Arnett Cobb
