= Snakehips =

Snakehips or Snake hips may refer to:

- Snakehips (duo), a British electronic/R&B music group
- Snake hips (dance), a blues dance movement involving rotating the hips
- Earl Snakehips Tucker (1905–1937), American dancer
- Ken Snakehips Johnson (1914–1941), British jazz band leader and dancer
- "Snake Hips", a 1994 song by Brand New Heavies from Brother Sister
- "Snake Hips", a 1995 song by The Future Sound of London from The Far-Out Son of Lung and the Ramblings of a Madman
- The hips of a snake; cf. Pelvic spur
