= The Magnificent Tommy Flanagan =

1981 studio album by Tommy Flanagan

Studio album by Tommy Flanagan
- Released: 1981
- Recorded: June 2–3, 1981
- Genre: Jazz
- Label: Progressive
- Producer: Gus P. Statiras

Tommy Flanagan chronology
...And a Little Pleasure (1981)	The Magnificent Tommy Flanagan (1981)	Giant Steps (1982)

Professional ratings
Review scores
Source	Rating
AllMusic	4/5 stars
The Penguin Guide to Jazz Recordings	3/4 stars

The Magnificent Tommy Flanagan is a 1981 studio album by jazz pianist Tommy Flanagan, with bassist George Mraz, and drummer Al Foster. Flanagan was nominated for a Grammy Award for Best Jazz Instrumental Performance, Soloist, for the album.

== Recording and music ==
The album was recorded on June 2 and 3, 1981, in New York City. Seven of the tracks are standards, and the eighth is "Blueish Grey", by Thad Jones.

== Track listing ==
1. "Speak Low" (Ogden Nash, Kurt Weill)
2. "Good Morning Heartache" (Ervin Drake, Dan Fisher, Irene Higginbotham)
3. "I Fall in Love Too Easily" (Sammy Cahn, Jule Styne)
4. "Just in Time" (Betty Comden)
5. "Old Devil Moon" (E.Y. "Yip" Harburg, Burton Lane)
6. "Ev'rything I Love" (Cole Porter)
7. "Change Partners" (Irving Berlin)
8. "Blueish Grey" (Thad Jones)

== Personnel ==
- Tommy Flanagan – piano
- George Mraz – bass
- Al Foster – drums
