= Keep On Pushing (disambiguation) =

Keep On Pushing is a 1964 album by the Impressions and the title track from the album.

Keep On Pushing or Keep On Pushin' may also refer to:

- Keep On Pushin', a 1984 album and title track by Arnett Cobb
- Keep On Pushing (The Black Seeds album), a 2001 album by the Black Seeds
- "Keep on Pushin' ", a song by Gene Clark from the 1967 album Gene Clark with the Gosdin Brothers
- "Keep on Pushin' ", a song from the Dangerous Ground soundtrack
