= Figure & Spirit =

Studio album by Lee Konitz Quintet
- Released: 1977
- Recorded: October 20, 1976
- Studio: The Downtown Sound Studio, NYC
- Genre: Jazz
- Length: 49:51
- Label: Progressive; PRO 7003
- Producer: Gus Statiras

Lee Konitz chronology
The Lee Konitz Nonet (1976)	Figure & Spirit (1977)	Pyramid (1977)

Figure & Spirit is an album by American jazz saxophonist Lee Konitz, recorded in 1976 and released on the Progressive label.

== Critical reception ==
Professional ratings
Review scores
Source	Rating
AllMusic	4.5/5 stars
The Penguin Guide to Jazz Recordings	3/4 stars
The Rolling Stone Jazz Record Guide	3/5 stars

Scott Yanow on AllMusic said that, "although there are a few minor mistakes, the music is quite exciting and spontaneous... Brown was the best possible substitute for Warne Marsh (Konitz's original choice for the record) and sounds in prime form. It's worth acquiring by fans of straight-ahead jazz".

== Track listing ==
All compositions by Lee Konitz except where noted.

1. "Figure and Spirit" - 6:50
2. "Dream Stepper" - 8:19
3. "Smog Eyes" (Ted Brown) - 7:25
4. "April" (Lennie Tristano) - 10:05
5. "Without You Man" - 5:22
6. "Dig It" (Brown) - 4:46
7. "Feather Bed" (Brown) - 7:04 Bonus track on CD reissue

== Personnel ==
- Lee Konitz - alto saxophone, soprano saxophone
- Ted Brown (saxophonist) - tenor saxophone
- Albert Dailey - piano
- Rufus Reid - bass
- Joe Chambers - drums
