= Mal 81 =

Studio album by Mal Waldron
- Released: 1981
- Recorded: June 18, 1981
- Genre: Jazz
- Length: 49:13
- Label: Progressive
- Producer: Gus Statiras

Mal Waldron chronology
Mingus Lives (1979)	Mal 81 (1981)	[[News: Run About Mal]] (1982)

Mal 81 is an album by American jazz pianist Mal Waldron recorded in 1981 and released by the Progressive label.

== Track listing ==
1. "Love for Sale" (Cole Porter) – 6:40
2. "Summertime" (DuBose Heyward, George Gershwin) – 6:20
3. "Angel Eyes" (Earl Brent, Matt Dennis) – 5:25
4. "Autumn Leaves" (Johnny Mercer, Joseph Kosma) – 6:58
5. "Body and Soul" (Edward Heyman, Robert Sour, Frank Eyton, Johnny Green) – 6:52
6. "I Surrender Dear" (Gordon Clifford, Harry Barris) – 7:13
7. "Yesterdays" (Jerome Kern, Otto Harbach) – 4:16
8. "All of You" (Porter) – 5:29

- Recorded at RCA Recording Studios in New York on June 18, 1981.

== Personnel ==
- Mal Waldron – piano
- George Mraz – bass
- Al Foster – drums
