= Statiras Records =

Statiras Records is a sub-label of Progressive Records which Progressive founder Gus Statiras launched in the 1980s that recorded jazz musical artists for release on LP and CD.

== Albums ==
- SLP-8074 Jazz Piano - Judy Carmichael, 1983
