= Derek Smith (musician) =

British jazz pianist (1931–2016)

- Born: Derek Smith; 17 August 1931; Stratford, London, England
- Died: 19 August 2016 (aged 85) New York, U.S.
- Genres: Jazz
- Occupation: Musician
- Instruments: Piano
- Years active: 1955–2007

Derek Smith (17 August 1931 – 19 August 2016) was a British jazz pianist.

== Biography ==
Born in London, his father Sidney was an Inland Revenue employee. His mother, Lillian, made the decision that he was to take up piano lessons. He was influenced by jazz pianist Art Tatum after listening to his recordings in the 1940s.

Smith played his first professional gig when he was fourteen. Someone rolled a piano out into the street, and he played for the VE Day celebrations in May, 1945. Over his parents' protestations, he joined John Dankworth's band when Cleo Laine was the female vocalist, and with many other British jazz musicians, including Kenny Graham and Kenny Baker. Smith also began performing and recording for the BBC, but soon realised the place for him professionally, was America.

Smith immigrated to the United States with no job awaiting him. Fourteen days after arriving in New York, he recorded with the Modern Jazz Quartet. One of his first engagements was working with his trio opposite Mel Tormé and Ella Fitzgerald at Basin Street East in New York. He joined Benny Goodman's band in 1961, and was pianist on Benny Goodman – The Swing Era, released by Time/Life Records, as well as working with Connie Kay and recording copiously as a session musician.

Derek Smith met Doc Severinsen when both were contracted to play a society gig. Later, when Severinsen was named leader of the NBC Orchestra, "The Tonight Show Band", he called Smith to be the pianist. Smith played with the band for seven years while continuing to record daily in New York studios and work with Benny Goodman. When The Tonight Show moved to the West Coast, Smith opted to stay in New York and continue his career as a "first call" studio musician.

Smith led his own band on CBS's Musical Chairs game show after he left The Tonight Show. After "Musical Chairs" was cancelled, he began concentrating on jazz concert performances while continuing to record. Smith's trio album, Love for Sale, was nominated for a Grammy Award on 1989. Smith has around 30 albums as leader to his credit in the United States and Japan. Described by critics as "fiery", "passionate", and having "an evil left hand", he was a frequent headliner at jazz festivals around the world.

Smith may be heard on recordings ranging from the popular Burt Bacharach/Dionne Warwick and Steve Lawrence/Eydie Gorme tracks, recorded in the 1960s, to jazz albums with Dizzy Gillespie, Buddy DeFranco, Louie Bellson, Milt Hinton, and Clark Terry. The material Smith has recorded also includes movie sound tracks among them Woody Allen's Hannah and Her Sisters (1986), Crimes and Misdemeanors (1989) and Martin Scorsese's The Age of Innocence (1993).

The roster of singers with whom Derek Smith performed go from Frank Sinatra to Luciano Pavarotti, Placido Domingo and Robert Palmer (in the Royal Albert Hall). Lyricist Sammy Cahn, a good friend until his death, comedian Steve Allen, and many other performers have frequently called upon his accompanying and conducting skills.

He continued to work with Goodman in the 1970s, and recorded as a leader from 1978. He worked as a solo performer into the 2000s and also played in a trio with Bobby Rosengarden and Milt Hinton.

Smith died in New York in 2016 aged 85.

== Discography ==
=== As leader ===
- Swingin' with Derek (Norma, 1961)
- Toasting (Time, 1962)
- Don't Let Go (1974)
- The Man I Love (Progressive, 1978)
- My Favorite Things (Progressive, 1978)
- Love for Sale (Progressive, 1978)
- Bluesette (Progressive, 1978)
- I'm Old Fashioned (Progressive, 1980)
- Derek Smith Trio Plays Jerome Kern (Progressive, 1980)
- Dark Eyes (Prestige, 1983)
- Derek Smith Plays the Passionate Piano (Special Music, 1987)
- Live Concert with Dick Hyman (Jass, 1992)
- The Trio – 1994 (Chiaroscuro, 1994)
- New Orleans Mardi Gras Explosion (Special Music, 1994)
- Dixieland Dance Party (Essex, 1995)
- Dick and Derek at the Movies with Dick Hyman (Arbors, 1998)
- High Energy (Arbors, 2002)
- Live in London (Harkit, 2004)
- Pan Montuno (Derek Smith, 2005)
- To Love Again (Venus, 2009)
- Beautiful Love (Venus, 2009)
- Constellation Jazz: Four Stars on a Brilliant Night at "Struggles" Jazz Club (Progressive, 2010)

=== As sideman ===
With Doc Severinsen

- 1968 The Great Arrival
- 1970 Doc Severinsen's Closet

With Marlena Shaw

- 1972 Marlena (Blue Note)
- 1973 From the Depths of My Soul (Blue Note)

With Tony Mottola

- 1973 Tony Mottola and the Quad Guitars
- 1974 Tony Mottola and the Brass Menagerie

With Linda Lewis

- 1975 Not a Little Girl Anymore
- 1977 Woman Overboard

With Arnett Cobb

- 1978 Arnett Cobb Is Back (Progressive)
- 1980 Funky Butt (Progressive)

With Bill Watrous

- 1975 The Tiger of San Pedro
- 1982 Roarin' Back into New York City
- 2000 Live at the Blue Note

With Teresa Brewer

- 1983 American Music Box, Vol. 1
- 1983 I Dig Big Band Singers
- 1984 Live at Carnegie Hall & Montreaux, Switzerland
- 1989 What a Wonderful World
- 1992 Memories of Louis

With Louie Bellson

- 1986 Louis Bellson & His Jazz Orchestra
- 1990 Airmail Special: A Salute to the Big Band Masters
- 1992 Peaceful Thunder
- 1994 Live from New York

With Buddy DeFranco

- 1990 Like Someone in Love
- 2007 Charlie Cat 2

With Flip Phillips

- 1993 Live at the 1993 Floating Jazz Festival
- 1999 John & Joe Revisited
- 2003 Celebrates His 80th Birthday

With Milt Hinton

- 1990 Old Man Time
- 1994 Laughing at Life

With Benny Goodman

- 1993 B. G. World Wide
- 1997 Live Down Under 1973 with Zoot Sims

With Dick Meldonian

- 1989 'S Wonderful
- 1994 You've Changed

With others

- 1958 Jazz Piano International, with Dick Katz, René Urtreger (Atlantic)
- 1983 They Got Rhythm: Live, Dick Hyman
- 1969 A Breath of Fresh Air, Marlene VerPlanck
- 1971 Permissive Polyphonics, Enoch Light & the Light Brigade
- 1975 Supernatural Thing, Ben E. King
- 1977 Baritone Madness, Nick Brignola
- 1978 Starfingers, Sal Salvador
- 1980 Inflation, Stanley Turrentine
- 1980 Pee Wee in New York, Pee Wee Erwin
- 1983 June Night, Svend Asmussen
- 1992 Ridin' High, Robert Palmer
- 1994 Special Relationship, Jimmy Knepper/Joe Temperley/Bobby Wellins
- 1995 For Your Ears Only, Bob Stewart
- 1999 The John Lewis Piano/Jazz Piano International, John Lewis
- 1999 Watching & Waiting, Gerry Mulligan
- 2000 QuaDRUMvirate, Ronnie Bedford
- 2001 I'll Never Forget You, Debra Holly
- 2002 Plays Not Quite Two Dozen, Kenny Baker
- 2002 Something Borrowed, Something Blue, Jerry Jerome
- 2002 The Giants at Bob Haggart's 80th Birthday Party, Bob Haggart
- 2003 As He Wanted to Be Remembered, Walt Levinsky
- 2003 Smile/Tarrytown Tenor, Carmen Leggio
- 2005 Tommy Newsom and His Octo-Pussycats, Tommy Newsom
- 2006 Spread a Little Happiness, John Dankworth
- 2007 Once More with Feeling, Phil Bodner

== See also ==
- The Green Bird (Elliot Goldenthal musical in which he performed.)
