= Jean Galatoire =

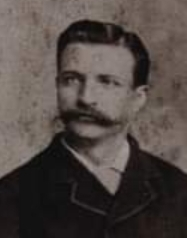

Jean Galatoire (5 December 1854 – 30 September 1919) was a French-American restaurateur who owned Galatoire's restaurant on Bourbon Street in New Orleans, Louisiana.

Galatoire was born in Pardies, a small village near Pau, France. In 1880, he immigrated to America, where he bought an inn and a restaurant in Birmingham, Alabama. In 1896 he moved to New Orleans and opened up a café.

In 1905, Jean Galatoire bought out Victor's Restaurant on Bourbon Street and reestablished it as Galatoire's.

He died in 1919 in New Orleans.
