= Movin' Right Along (album) =

Studio album by Arnett Cobb
- Released: 1960
- Recorded: February 16 & 17, 1960; Van Gelder Studio, Englewood Cliffs, New Jersey
- Genre: Jazz
- Length: 36:25
- Label: Prestige; PRLP 7175
- Producer: Esmond Edwards

Arnett Cobb chronology
More Party Time (1960)	Movin' Right Along (1960)	Sizzlin' (1960)

Professional ratings
Review scores
Source	Rating
Allmusic	4/5 stars

Movin' Right Along is an album by saxophonist Arnett Cobb recorded in 1960 for the Prestige label.

== Reception ==
The Allmusic review awarded the album 4 stars and stated: "Movin' Right Along is a warm, stimulating set. Recorded in two days in February 1960, the album finds Arnett Cobb and a few friends playing an energetic, straight-ahead set".

== Track listing ==
All compositions by Arnett Cobb except as indicated

1. "Nitty Gritty" - 3:54
2. "All I Do Is Dream of You" (Nacio Herb Brown, Arthur Freed) - 4:03
3. "I Don't Stand a Ghost of a Chance With You" (Bing Crosby, Ned Washington, Victor Young) - 5:23
4. "Exactly Like You" (Dorothy Fields, Jimmy McHugh) - 6:31
5. "Walkin'" (Richard Carpenter) - 5:29
6. "Softly, As in a Morning Sunrise" (Oscar Hammerstein II, Sigmund Romberg) - 4:08
7. "Fast Ride" - 4:12
8. "The Shy One" - 4:43
- Recorded at Van Gelder Studio in Englewood Cliffs, New Jersey, on February 16 (track 7) and February 17 (tracks 1–6 & 8), 1960.

== Personnel ==
- Arnett Cobb - tenor saxophone
- Tommy Flanagan (track 7), Bobby Timmons (tracks 1–6 & 8) - piano
- Sam Jones - bass
- Art Taylor - drums
- Danny Barrajanos (track 7), Buck Clarke (tracks 1–6 & 8) - congas
