= Show Time (Arnett Cobb album) =

Live album by Arnett Cobb, Dizzy Gillespie, Jewel Brown
- Released: 1988
- Recorded: August 10, 1987
- Venue: Gus S. Wortham Center, Houston, TX
- Genre: Jazz
- Length: 39:31
- Label: Fantasy; F-9659
- Producer: David Thompson, Steve Williams

Arnett Cobb chronology
Keep on Pushin' (1984)	Show Time (1988)	Tenor Tribute (1988)

Show Time is a live album by saxophonist Arnett Cobb with guests appearances by Dizzy Gillespie and Jewel Brown which was recorded in Houston in 1987 and released on the Fantasy label the following year.

== Reception ==
Professional ratings
Review scores
Source	Rating
AllMusic	3.5/5 stars
The Penguin Guide to Jazz Recordings	3/4 stars

The AllMusic review by Scott Yanow stated "Tenor saxophonist Arnett Cobb's next-to-last recording was cut at a concert in Houston that was held to celebrate his 69th birthday. Cobb is in typically fine form. ... This CD is a mixed bag, not essential but generally quite interesting".

== Track listing ==
1. "Sweet Mama" (Dizzy Gillespie) – 7:19
2. "The Nearness of You" (Hoagy Carmichael, Ned Washington) – 4:25
3. "Just a Closer Walk with Thee" (Traditional) – 5:44
4. "Kathy's Blues" (Arnett Cobb) – 3:22
5. "This Bitter Earth" (Clyde Otis) – 5:03
6. "Time After Time" (Jule Styne, Sammy Cahn) – 4:31
7. "A Night in Tunisia" (Gillespie, Frank Paparelli) – 7:26
8. "Jazz Heritage Boogie" (Sammy Price) – 3:04

== Personnel ==
- Arnett Cobb – tenor saxophone
- Dizzy Gillespie – trumpet, vocals (tracks 1 & 7)
- Jewel Brown – vocals (tracks 5 & 6)
- Kenny Andrews (tracks 2–6), Paul English (tracks 1 & 7), Sammy Price (track 8) – piano
- Clayton Dyess – guitar (tracks 1–7)
- Derrick Lewis– bass
- Mike Lefebvre (tracks 1, 7 & 8), Malcolm Pinson (tracks 2–6) – drums
