= Nofio Pecora =

Italian-American mobster with the New Orleans crime family

Nofia Pecora was an Italian-American mobster who worked as a top lieutenant under Carlos Marcello of the New Orleans crime family.

== Biography ==
Pecora ran a call girl ring between Jefferson Parish, Louisiana and Harrison County, Mississippi. In 1953 the Town and Country Motel was built, which served as a front for Marcello. Nearby a restaurant was set up to serve it, with Pecora being placed in charge. In the latter 1950s he and his wife took over the Tropical Tourist Court and Trailer Camp. He also operated a strip joint on Bourbon Street.

Pecora had strong family connections within the Marcello organization. His brother-in-law was D'Alton Smith, Marcello's closest advisor for a time, and his sister-in-law was the wife of Joseph Poretti, another Marcello associate who managed his real-estate properties. Most significantly his wife Frances was Marcello's secretary. Along with his brother Joe, he was a significant component in the purchase and distribution of narcotics in the New Orleans area. Pecora was a frequent visitor to the Best Sales Company, operated by Gerardo Catena's brother Eugene, of the Genovese crime family. He was also associated with James Henry Dolan of Dallas.

Pecora's associations extended into politics. In 1964 the Governor of Louisiana John J. McKeithen made his wife Chairman of the Fire Insurance Rating Division of the Louisiana Insurance Rating Commission. He had a warm relationship with the local Small Business Administration and was easily able to obtain loans, including one loan of $210,000. Another was Marshall Brown, of the Democratic National Committee. In August 1968 Pecora got in a police chase after they attempted to pull him over for speeding. The car was found to be registered to an insurance agency owned by Brown. In September Pecora speeding charges were dismissed.

He had a son Nofio Pecora Jr. In 1991 Pecora Jr. and his mother Frances were indicted for bribery and money laundering.
