= Arnett Cobb Live =

Live album by Arnett Cobb
- Released: 1983
- Recorded: November 13, 1982
- Venue: Jazzhuis de Spiegel, Groningen, Holland
- Genre: Jazz
- Length: 44:29
- Label: Timeless; SJP 174
- Producer: Wim Wigt

Arnett Cobb chronology
Funky Butt (1980)	Arnett Cobb Live (1983)	Keep On Pushin' (1984)

Arnett Cobb Live is a live album by saxophonist Arnett Cobb which was recorded in Holland in 1982 and released on the Dutch Timeless label the following year.

== Reception ==
Professional ratings
Review scores
Source	Rating
AllMusic	3.5/5 stars

The AllMusic review by Scott Yanow stated "The tenor always seemed on the verge of exploding and was still in prime form, as can be heard on four basic standards and his blues "Cobb's Idea." A lesser-known but rewarding effort, one of Cobb's best from his later years".

== Track listing ==
1. "Cobb's Idea" (Arnett Cobb) – 11:00
2. "Sweet Georgia Brown" (Ben Bernie, Maceo Pinkard, Kenneth Casey) – 10:56
3. "Just a Closer Walk with Thee" (Traditional) – 7:54
4. "Body and Soul" (Johnny Green, Frank Eyton, Edward Heyman, Robert Sour) – 6:33
5. "I Got Rhythm" (George Gershwin, Ira Gershwin) – 6:02
6. Final Words by Arnett Cobb – 2:04

== Personnel ==
- Arnett Cobb – tenor saxophone
- Rein de Graaff – piano
- Jacques Schols – bass
- John Engels – drums
