= Ballads by Cobb =

Studio album by Arnett Cobb
- Released: 1960
- Recorded: November 1, 1960
- Studio: Van Gelder Studio, Englewood Cliffs, New Jersey
- Genre: Jazz
- Length: 33:21
- Label: Moodsville; MVLP 14
- Producer: Esmond Edwards

Arnett Cobb chronology
Sizzlin' (1960)	Ballads by Cobb (1960)	The Wild Man from Texas (1974)

Ballads by Cobb is an album by saxophonist Arnett Cobb recorded in 1960 for the Moodsville label.

== Reception ==
Professional ratings
Review scores
Source	Rating
Allmusic	3/5 stars

Allmusic awarded the album 3 stars.

== Track listing ==
1. "Willow Weep for Me" (Ann Ronell) - 7:14
2. "Hurry Home" (Buddy Bernier, Bob Emmerich. Joseph Meyer) - 4:46
3. "P.S. I Love You" (Gordon Jenkins, Johnny Mercer) - 5:07
4. "Blue and Sentimental" (Count Basie, Mack David, Jerry Livingston) - 5:21
5. "Darn That Dream" (Eddie DeLange, Jimmy Van Heusen) - 4:47
6. "Why Try to Change Me Now?" (Cy Coleman, Joseph McCarthy) - 2:49
7. "Your Wonderful Love" (Al Fields, Timmie Rogers) - 3:17

== Personnel ==
- Arnett Cobb - tenor saxophone
- Red Garland - piano, celeste
- George Duvivier - bass
- J. C. Heard - drums
