= Arnett Cobb Is Back =

Studio album by Arnett Cobb
- Released: 1978
- Recorded: June 27, 1978
- Studio: Downtown Sound Studio, NYC
- Genre: Jazz
- Length: 59:01 CD release with additional tracks
- Label: Progressive; PRO 7037
- Producer: Gus P. Statiras

Arnett Cobb chronology
The Wild Man from Texas (1976)	Arnett Cobb Is Back (1978)	Live at Sandy's! (1978)

Arnett Cobb Is Back is an album by saxophonist Arnett Cobb which was recorded in 1978 and released on the Progressive label. The 1994 CD reissue included two additional alternate takes.

== Reception ==
Professional ratings
Review scores
Source	Rating
AllMusic	4/5 stars
The Penguin Guide to Jazz Recordings	3/4 stars

The AllMusic review by Scott Yanow stated "One of the great tough Texas tenors, Arnett Cobb roars and stomps throughout this excellent LP".

== Track listing ==
All compositions by Arnett Cobb except where noted.

1. "Flying Home" (Benny Goodman, Lionel Hampton, Sid Robin) – 6:59
2. "Big Red's Groove" – 7:45
3. "Cherry" (Don Redman, Ray Gilbert) – 7:50
4. "Sweet Georgia Brown" (Ben Bernie, Maceo Pinkard, Kenneth Casey) – 6:00
5. "I Don't Stand a Ghost of a Chance with You" (Victor Young, Bing Crosby, Ned Washington) – 4:39
6. "Blues for Shirley" – 7:10
7. "Take the "A" Train" (Billy Strayhorn) – 6:08
8. "Big Red's Groove" [take 3] – 5:01 Additional track on CD release
9. "Blues for Shirley" [rehearsal] – 7:29 Additional track on CD release

== Personnel ==
- Arnett Cobb – tenor saxophone
- Derek Smith – piano
- George Mraz – bass
- Billy Hart – drums
