= Mingus Lives =

Live album by Mal Waldron
- Released: 1979
- Recorded: February 28, 1979
- Genre: Jazz
- Length: 37:04
- Label: Enja
- Producer: Horst Weber

Mal Waldron chronology
Moods (1978)	Mingus Lives (1979)	Mal 81 (1981)

Mingus Lives is a live album by American jazz pianist Mal Waldron recorded in Belgium in 1979 and released by the Enja label.

== Reception ==
The Allmusic review awarded the album 3 stars.

Professional ratings
Review scores
Source	Rating
Allmusic	3/5 stars

== Track listing ==
All compositions by Mal Waldron

1. "Mingus Lives" — 7:48
2. "Snake Out" — 10:42
3. "Tensile Structure" — 7:54
4. "Here, There and Anywhere" — 10:44

- Recorded at the Chapati Club in Spa, Belgium on February 28, 1979

== Personnel ==
- Mal Waldron – piano
