= Bourbon Street =

Historic street in the French Quarter of New Orleans

- Rue Bourbon (French); Calle de Borbón (Spanish)
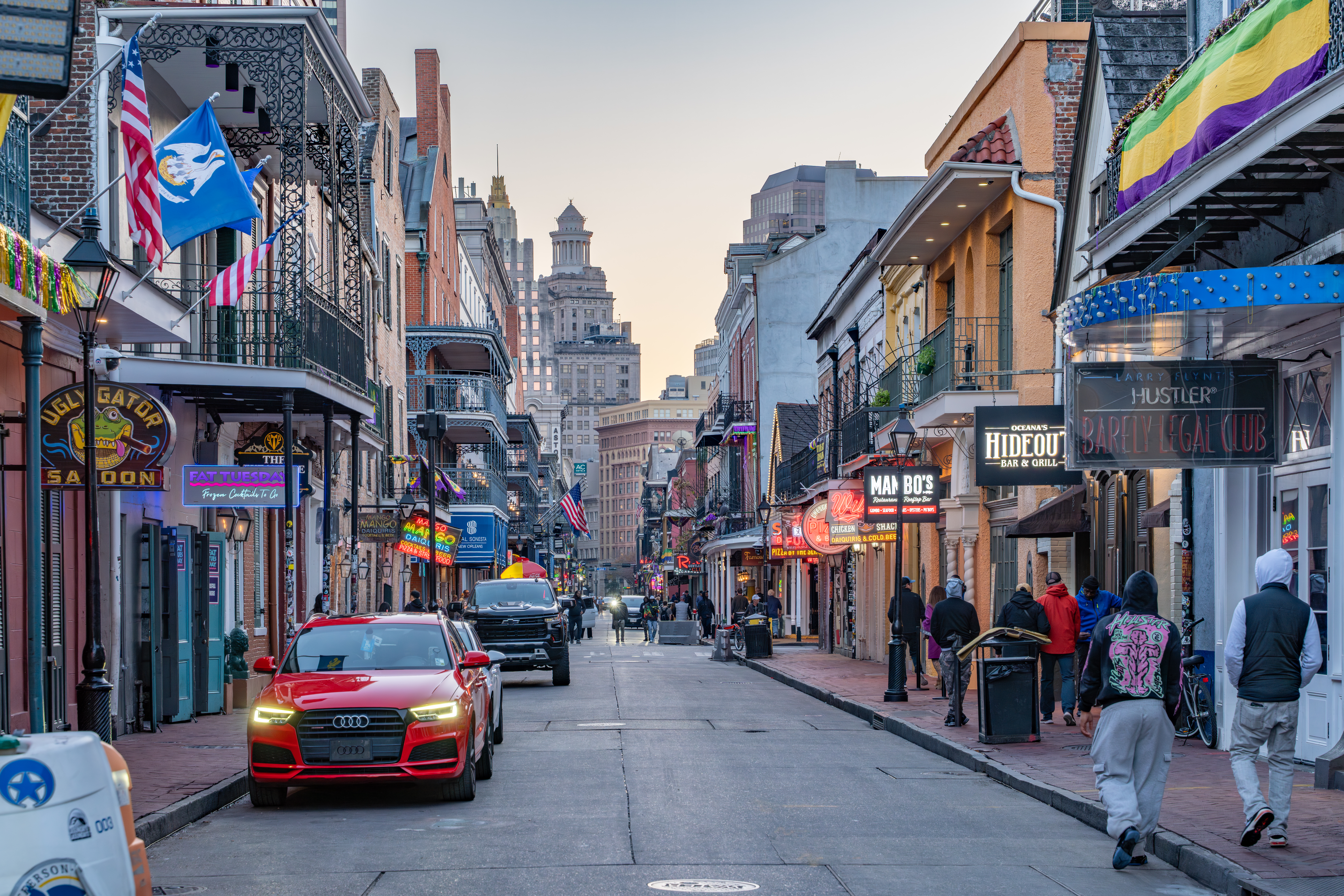
- Looking up Bourbon Street toward the New Orleans Central Business District
- Location: New Orleans, Louisiana, United States
- Southwest end: Canal Street in the Central Business District
- Northeast end: Kerlerce Street / Pauger Street in the Marigny

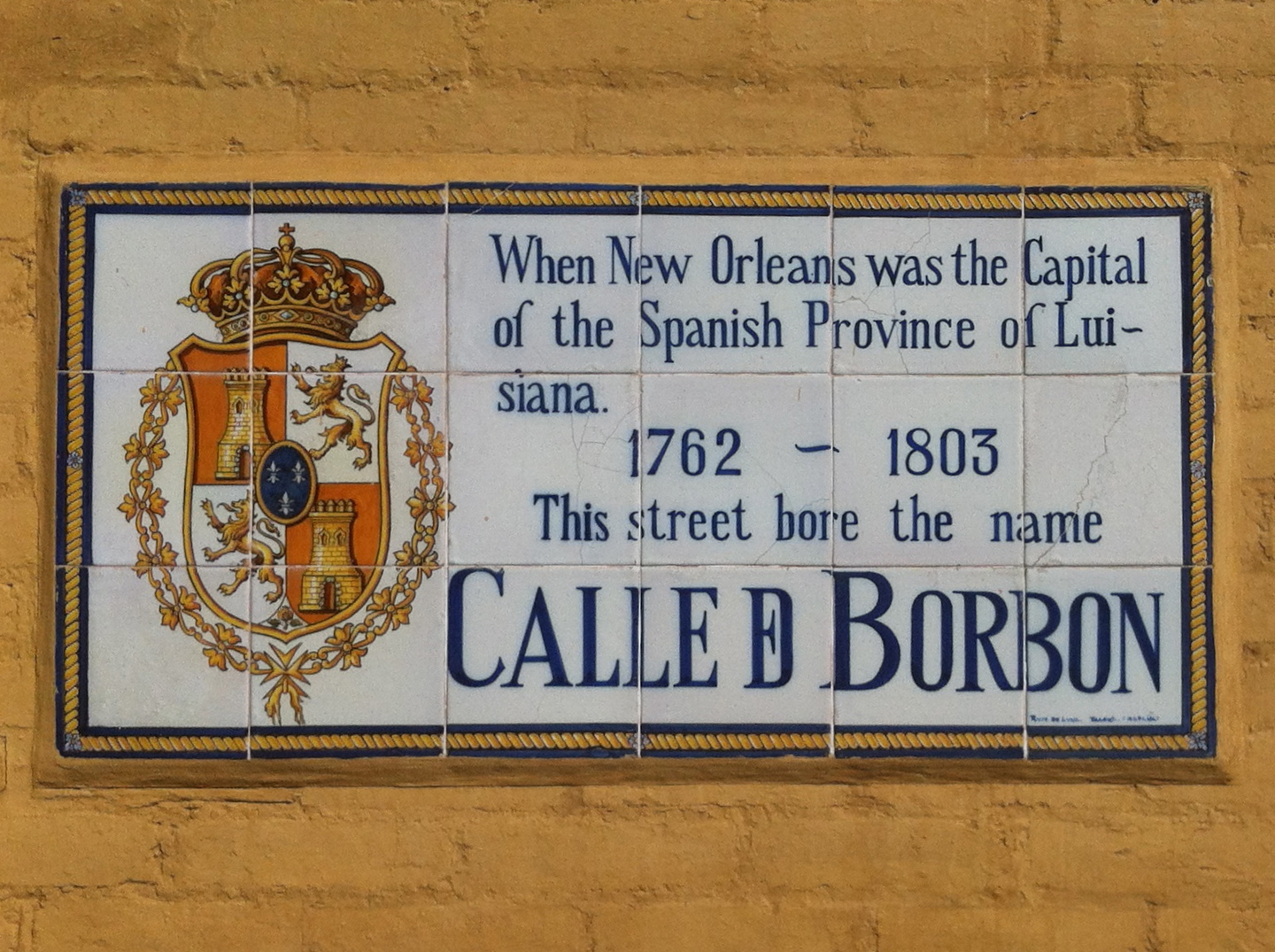
Tile mosaic explaining that the name of the street was Calle de Borbón when New Orleans was capital of the Spanish Province of Louisiana from 1762 to 1803

Bourbon Street (French: Rue Bourbon, Spanish: Calle de Borbón) is a historic street in the heart of the French Quarter of New Orleans. Extending twelve blocks from Canal Street to Esplanade Avenue, Bourbon Street hosts many bars, restaurants and strip clubs.

Visitor numbers dropped after Hurricane Katrina in 2005, but gradually recovered over the following decade. The street receives millions of visitors each year.

== History ==
=== 1700 to 1880 ===
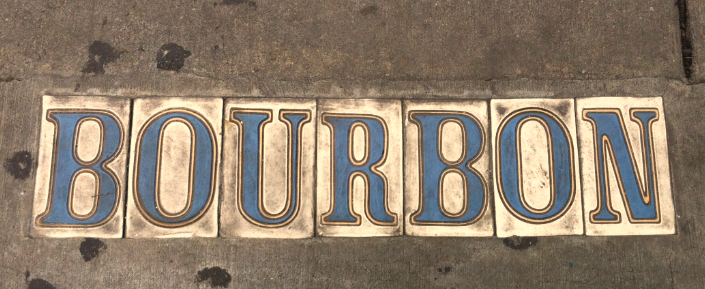
Street name done with tiles in the sidewalk

The French claimed Louisiana in the 1690s, and Jean-Baptiste Le Moyne de Bienville was appointed Director General in charge of developing a colony in the territory. He founded New Orleans in 1718. In 1721, the street was named after French engineer Adrien de Pauger who designed the city's street layout. He named the streets after French royal houses and Catholic saints. He paid homage to France's ruling family, the House of Bourbon, with the naming of Bourbon Street.

New Orleans was transferred to Spain in 1763 following the Seven Years' War. The Great New Orleans Fire of 1788 destroyed 80 percent of the city's buildings. The Spanish rebuilt many of the damaged structures, which are still standing today, so that Bourbon Street and the French Quarter display more Spanish than French influence.

Following a brief restoration of French rule, the United States gained control of the colony with the 1803 Louisiana Purchase. They translated the French street names into English, with Rue Bourbon becoming Bourbon Street.

During the 19th century, New Orleans was similar to other Southern cities in that its economy was based on selling cash crops, such as sugar and tobacco. By 1840, newcomers whose wealth came from these enterprises turned New Orleans into the third largest metropolis in the country. The city's port was the nation's second largest, after New York City's.

The main difference between New Orleans and other Southern cities was its unique cultural heritage from having been a French and Spanish possession. Promoters emphasized this cultural legacy, in the form of its architecture, cuisine and traditions, to attract tourists to New Orleans.

=== 1788-1794 ===
The Shift to Spanish Architectural Studies had happened in late 1788-1794 where the city of New Orleans had suffered two great fires that destroyed 1068 structures (Great New Orleans Fire of (1794)). This is important because during that time the city was not under French control, so when it came time to rebuild the Spanish had influenced the architecture which can be seen to this day with the Spanish inspired brickwork, plaster (stucco) exteriors and the heavy use of iron balconies.

=== 1880 to 1960 ===
The French Quarter was central to this image of cultural legacy and became the best-known part of the city. Recent arrivals in New Orleans criticized the perceived loose morals of the Creoles, a perception that drew many travelers to New Orleans to drink, gamble and visit the city's brothels, beginning in the 1880s.

Bourbon Street was a desirable residential area before about 1900. This changed in the late 1800s and early 1900s, when the Storyville red-light district was constructed on Basin Street adjacent to the French Quarter. The area became known for prostitution, gambling and vaudeville acts. Jazz is said to have developed here, with artists such as King Oliver and Jelly Roll Morton providing musical entertainment at the brothels.

This was also the era when some of New Orleans' most famous restaurants were founded. Galatoire's, at 209 Bourbon Street was established by Jean Galatoire in 1905. Known for years by its characteristic line snaking down Bourbon Street, patrons wait for hours just to get a table, especially on Fridays.

Before World War II, the French Quarter was emerging as a major asset to the city's economy. While there was an interest in historic districts at the time, developers pressured to modernize the city. Simultaneously, with the wartime influx of people, property owners opened adult-centered nightclubs to capitalize on the city's risqué image. Wartime Bourbon Street was memorably depicted in Erle Stanley Gardner's detective novel "Owls Don't Blink". After the war, Bourbon Street became the new Storyville in terms of reputation. By the 1940s and 1950s, nightclubs lined Bourbon Street; there were over 50 different burlesque and striptease shows and venues with exotic dancers. One was owned by Nofio Pecora of the New Orleans crime family.

=== 1917 ===
The Historic Red Light District was forced to close by the U.S Navy. This closure had helped bring Jazz musicians and other businesses to migrate into the French Quarter, more specifically to Bourbon Street, allowing them to become more focused in entertainment.

=== 1940s-1950s The Burlesque Boom ===
After World War II, Bourbon Street became a center of New Orleans nightlife. During the 1940s and 1950s, the street was known for burlesque and striptease venues featuring exotic dancers, comedians, risqué singers, contortionists, and live house bands. One local historical account states that more than fifty acts could be seen along a five-block stretch on a given night.

=== Since 1960 ===
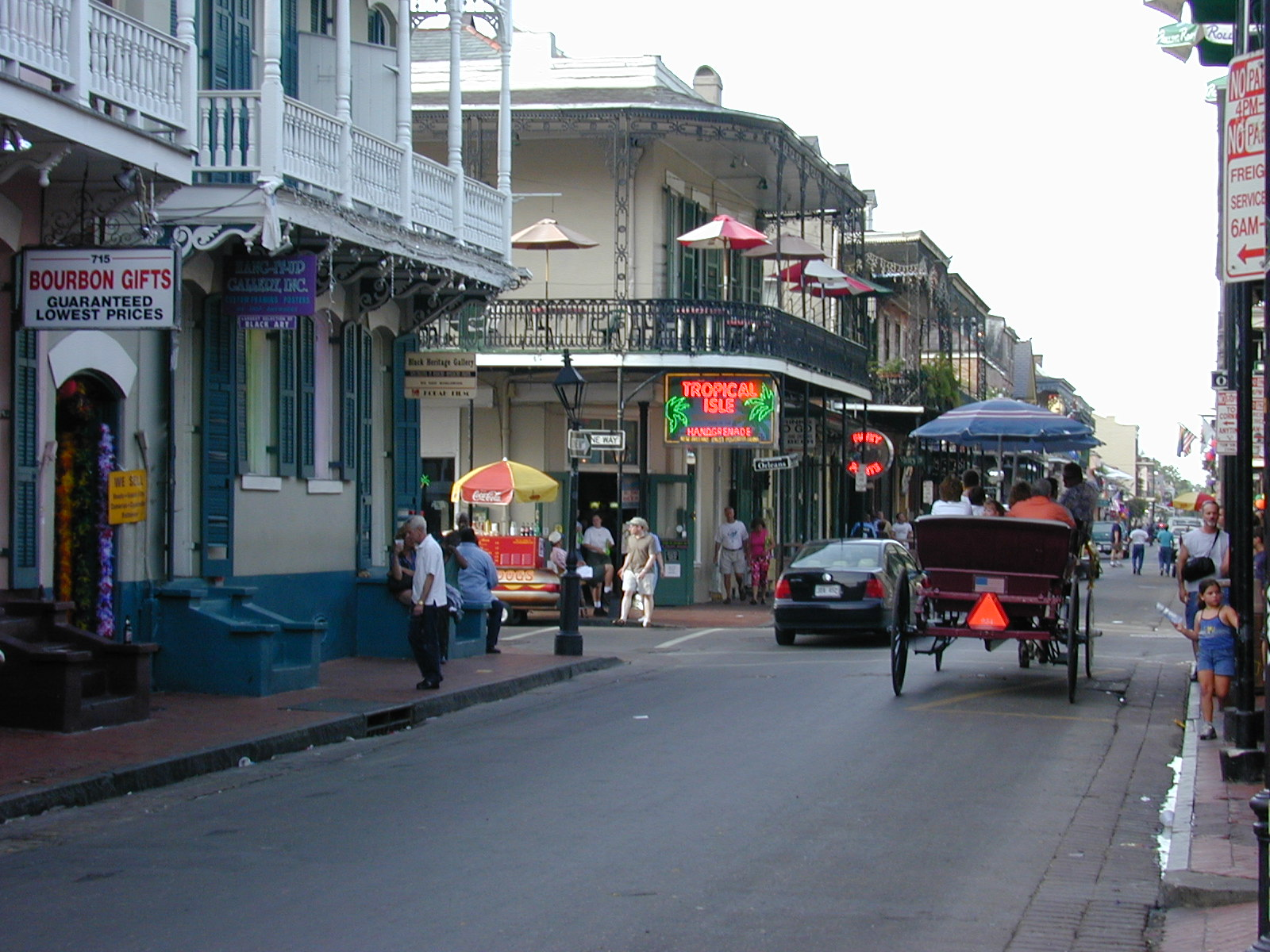
Bourbon Street, New Orleans, 2002

There was a move in the 1960s under District Attorney Jim Garrison to clean up Bourbon Street. In August 1962, two months after he was elected, Garrison began raiding adult entertainment establishments on Bourbon. These raids also targeted B-drinking, a scheme where a stripper in the establishment conned men into buying highly overpriced drinks. His efforts mirrored those of his predecessors, which had been largely unsuccessful; however, he had more success. He forced closure on a dozen nightclubs convicted of prostitution and selling overpriced alcohol. Following this campaign, Bourbon Street became populated by peep shows and sidewalk beer stands.

When Mayor Moon Landrieu came into office in 1970, he focused his efforts on stimulating tourism. He did so by making Bourbon Street a pedestrian mall, making it more inviting. The 1980s and 1990s were characterized by a Disneyfication of Bourbon Street. Critics of the rapid increase of souvenir shops and corporate ventures said that Bourbon Street had become Creole Disneyland, and that the street's authenticity had been lost in this process.

On April 5, 2018, a giant saxophone, nearly 11 feet (3.4 m) high, was installed in the street. The installation was a gift from Namur, Belgium, to commemorate that the inventor of the instrument, Adolphe Sax, was from Dinant in Namur.

==== 1971- Pedestrian Mall ====
It was at this point that the city acknowledged Bourbon Street was a hub in nightlife and had begun transforming the street into a pedestrian mall. Along with that came the time when ambulatory drinking and the infamous go cup began.

==== Impact of Hurricane Katrina ====
Given Bourbon Street's high-ground location in the French Quarter, it was mostly intact following 2005's Hurricane Katrina. A major tourist attraction, Bourbon Street renovation was given high priority after the storm. However, New Orleans was still experiencing a lack of visitors. In 2004, the year before Katrina, the city had 10.1 million visitors. The year after the storm, that number was 3.7 million.

One third of the city's operating budget, approximately $6 billion before Katrina, came from visitors and conventions, so officials saw tourism as vital for post-disaster economic recovery.

The New Orleans Tourism Marketing Corporation initiated efforts to draw visitors back to the city, featuring celebrities such as Emeril Lagasse and Patricia Clarkson with the slogan, "Come fall In love with Louisiana all over again." Travelers heard mixed messages in the media. Advertising campaigns gave the impression that New Orleans was thriving, while city leaders asked for increased federal financial assistance and National Guard troops to help control municipal crime waves.

New Orleans has been working its way back to pre-Katrina tourist numbers, as it attracted 9.5 million visitors in 2014 and 10.5 million visitors in 2016. The 2016 record was the highest since 2004.

For a time in April 2017, the 100 block of Bourbon Street was closed off for reconstruction of the street and its underground utilities as part of the city's $6 million French Quarter infrastructure project.

==== Impact of COVID-19 ====
The emergence of the COVID-19 pandemic in 2020 profoundly impacted this renowned destination, triggering a series of unprecedented challenges and transformations that reverberated throughout the local community and beyond. The effects of COVID-19 on Bourbon Street were far-reaching, encompassing economic, social, and cultural dimensions. The implementation of strict public health measures, including lockdowns and capacity restrictions, dealt a significant blow to the area's economy, particularly its hospitality sector. On Saturday, July 25, the first day of the ban, the morning pace was about the same as a normal day on Bourbon Street but by afternoon, it had picked up to 17 to 20 people per minute, and steadily increased over the next eight hours, peaking between 10 and 10:30 p.m. to around 58 people per minute. Few appeared to be holding drinks, and those who did had probably purchased cans or bottles at stores, as all the bars and music clubs were closed.

According to a report by The Times-Picayune/The New Orleans Advocate, the closure of bars, restaurants, and entertainment venues along Bourbon Street led to substantial revenue losses and widespread layoffs, plunging many businesses into financial distress. Moreover, the absence of tourists, who typically flock to the street year-round, further exacerbated the economic downturn, with hotel occupancy rates plummeting to historic lows. Beyond its economic ramifications, the pandemic also reshaped the social landscape of Bourbon Street. Traditional gatherings and cultural events, such as Mardi Gras festivities and live music performances, were either canceled or significantly scaled back to comply with public health guidelines. The profound impact of these cancellations on the local community was highlighted in a study conducted by researchers from Tulane University, which underscored the emotional toll of lost traditions and communal rituals.

==== 2025 attack ====
On January 1, 2025, 15 people were killed and 35 were injured when a pickup truck driven by US Army veteran Shamsud-Din Jabbar, a US citizen, drove into a crowd of people walking on Bourbon Street, in what New Orleans mayor LaToya Cantrell described as a "terrorist attack." Jabbar left the vehicle and attacked with firearms; he was later killed in a standoff with police. There was a flag of Islamist terrorist group ISIS in the bed of the vehicle. Due to the attack, the 2025 Sugar Bowl, which had been scheduled to be held that day in the local Superdome, was postponed to the following day.

== Entertainment, bars, and restaurants ==
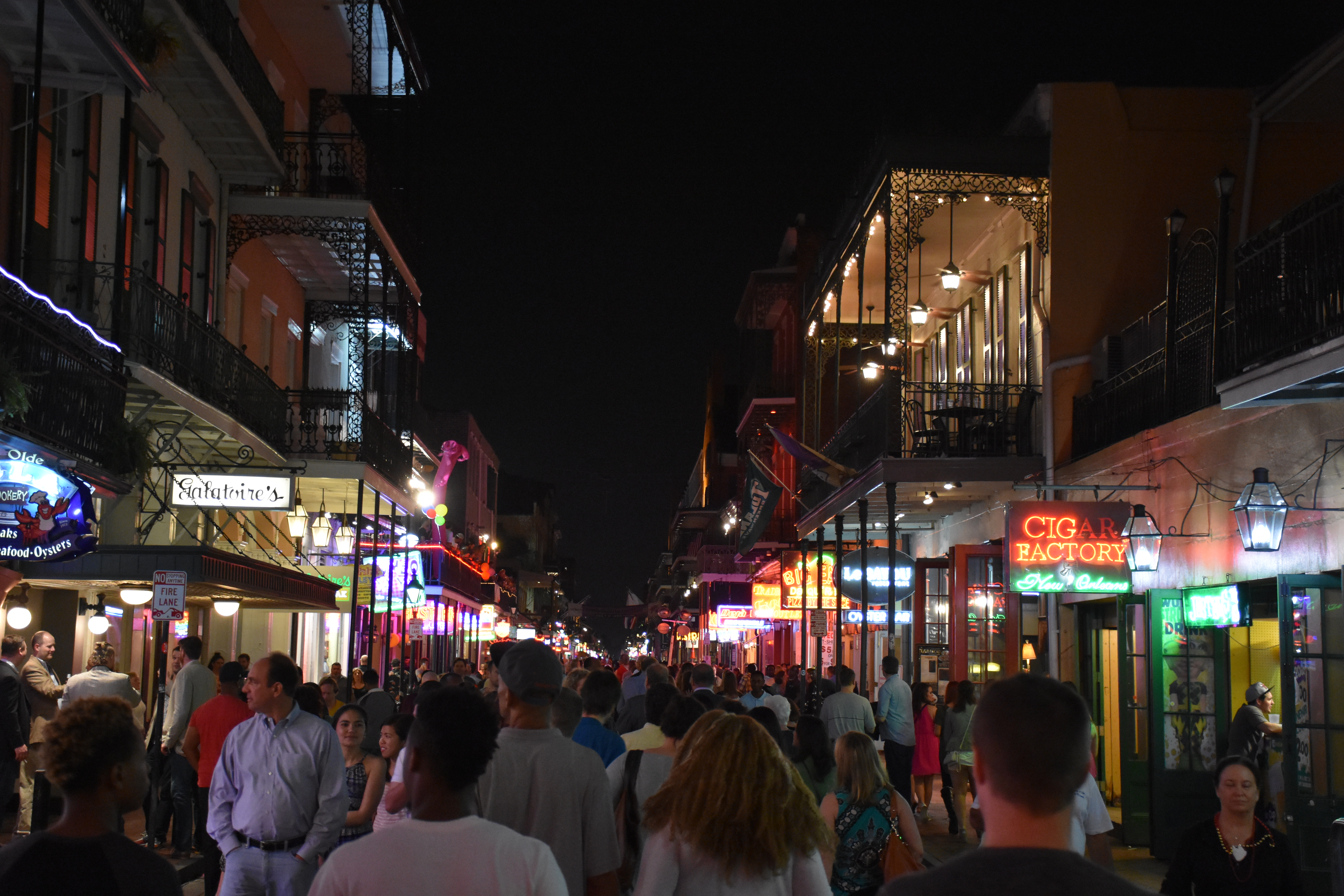
Looking northeast from Iberville Street in 2015

Largely quiet during the day, Bourbon Street comes alive at night – particularly during the French Quarter's many festivals. Most famous of these is the annual Mardi Gras celebration, when the streets teem with thousands of people. Local open container laws allow drinking alcoholic beverages on the Quarter's streets. Popular drinks include the hurricane cocktail, the resurrection cocktail, the hand grenade and the so-called "huge-ass beers" – a large plastic cup of draft beer sold cheaply to tourists.

The most-visited section of Bourbon Street is "upper Bourbon Street" toward Canal Street, an eight-block section of visitor attractions including bars, restaurants, souvenir shops and strip clubs. In the 21st century, Bourbon Street is the home of New Orleans Musical Legends Park, a free, outdoor venue for live jazz performances. The park has sculptures and other tributes to the city's legendary music personalities. Also home to Larry Flynts' Iconic flagship Hustler Club.

Most of the bars are located in the central section of Bourbon. Popular spots include Pat O'Brien's, Johnny White's, the Famous Door, Spirits on Bourbon, Channing Tatum's Saints and Sinners, Razzoo and The Cat's Meow. Marie Laveau's House of Voodoo is located on the corner of St. Ann Street.

The most renowned restaurant on Bourbon Street is Galatoire's; it represents traditional New Orleans dining and has a dress code. Lafitte's Blacksmith Shop and the Old Absinthe House are two of the many casual eateries. Also notable is the locals’ hangout, the Bourbon House.

"Lower Bourbon Street" (lower being a reference to downriver, or downstream Mississippi River), from the intersection of St. Ann Street, caters to New Orleans' thriving gay community. Featuring such establishments as Oz and the city's largest gay nightclub, the Bourbon Pub, St. Ann Street has been referred to as "the Velvet Line" or "the Lavender Line," the edge or approximate boundary of the French Quarter's gay community. Cafe-Lafitte-in-Exile is the oldest gay bar in the nation. The intersection of Bourbon and St. Ann Streets is also the center of the Labor Day weekend event Southern Decadence, commonly referred to as the Gay Mardi Gras, which attracts upwards of 100,000 participants.

Bourbon Street's nightlife is also a major part of its entertainment; bar, and restaurant places like Bourbon Bandstand, Fritezel's Jazz Club, Half Past Whiskey, are mainstays for concerts or just good night-out on Bourbon Street.

== Legal issues ==
Historically, noise violations were the responsibility of the individual making the noise. This changed in 1996 with Yokum v. 615 Bourbon Street, which ruled that the property owner, not the noise-maker, is responsible for noise violations. A 2010 city ordinance states that no music may be played in the French Quarter between 8 pm and 9 am. Enforcement has been inconsistent, and critics claim its goals are vague. Some even say that the local law is unconstitutional. Besides being difficult to enforce, music enthusiasts claim that noise ordinances threaten the city's notable music culture. Local jazz bands who play in the streets, such as the To Be Continued Brass Band, would be prohibited from doing so under such ordinances.

"Aggressive solicitation" bans are a more recent issue on Bourbon Street. In 2011, an ordinance was passed which prohibited individuals and groups from "disseminating any social, political or religious message" at night. The ordinance did not explain the justification for the rule. On September 21, 2012, the ACLU of Louisiana won a temporary restraining order against the ban, on behalf of Kelsey McCauley (Bohn), a woman who converted to Christianity through a religious group's activities on Bourbon Street. The group had several of its members arrested, some of whom were cited on September 14, 2012, for violating the anti-solicitation ordinance. A hearing was set for October 1, 2012.

On July 25, 2013, the New Orleans City Council voted 6-0 to amend the law and exempt Bourbon Street from the ban, with legal language found acceptable by the participating attorneys.

== Architectural Case Studies ==
John Lafitte had owned a business called the Lafitte's Blacksmith shop and bar. It is located on the corner of Bourbon Street and St. Phillip it is also considered one of the oldest and still operating buildings in New Orleans and one of the oldest operating bars in the United States. It is said that it was also the base for Lafitte's smuggling business.

=== French Opera House ===
In 1919 the French Opera House was at the corner of Bourbon and Toulouse Streets. It was considered that the destruction of this building was the end of the high society of the French Creole culture, as the quarter began its transformation into an "entreatment and vice" district.

== See also ==
- Basin Street
- Bourbon Street Hotel and Casino
- Canal Street
- French Market
- French Quarter
- Jackson Square
- Royal Street
