= Arnett Cobb =

American jazz tenor saxophonist (1918–1989)

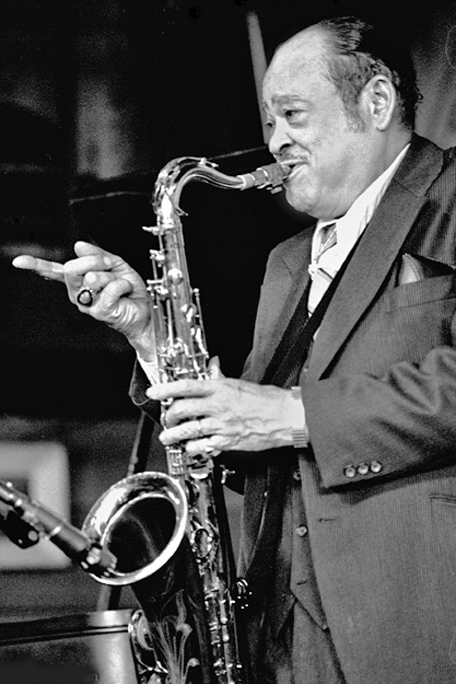
- Cobb at the Bach Dancing & Dynamite Society, Half Moon Bay, California, 1979

Background information
- Born: Arnette Cleophus Cobbs; August 10, 1918; Houston, Texas, U.S.
- Died: March 24, 1989 (aged 70) Houston, Texas, U.S.
- Genres: Jazz; swing; blues
- Occupation: Musician
- Instrument: Tenor saxophone

Arnett Cleophus Cobb (August 10, 1918 – March 24, 1989) was an American jazz tenor saxophonist, sometimes known as the "Wild Man of the Tenor Sax" because of his uninhibited stomping style. Cobb wrote the words and music for the jazz standard "Smooth Sailing" (1951), which Ella Fitzgerald recorded for Decca and later included on her album Lullabies of Birdland.

== Biography ==
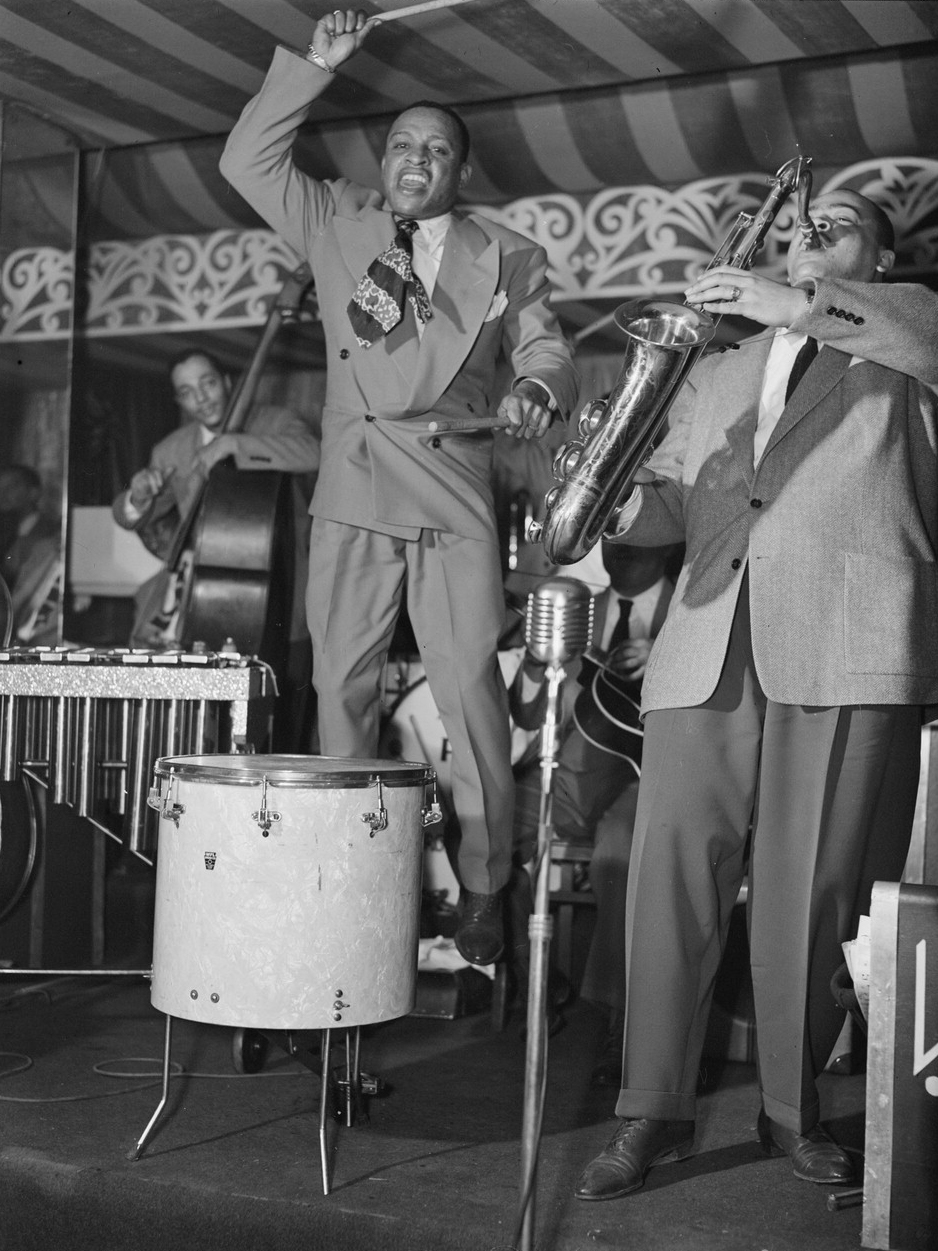
Cobb (right) and Lionel Hampton, c. June 1946; photo by William P. Gottlieb

Born in Houston, Texas, Cobb was taught to play piano by his grandmother, and he went on to study violin before taking up the tenor saxophone in his high school band. At the age of 15, he joined Louisiana bandleader Frank Davis's band, doing shows in Houston and throughout Louisiana during the summer.

Cobb continued his musical career with the local bands of trumpeter Chester Boone, from 1934 to 1936, and Milt Larkin, from 1936 to 1942 (which included a period on the West Coast with Floyd Ray). Among his bandmates in the Larkin band were Illinois Jacquet, Eddie "Cleanhead" Vinson, Tom Archia, Cedric Haywood, and Wild Bill Davis. Having turned down an offer from Count Basie in 1939, Cobb replaced Jacquet in Lionel Hampton's band in 1942, staying with Hampton until 1947. Cobb's featured solo on Hampton's theme song "Flying Home No. 2" generated much excitement, his blasting style earning him the label "Wild Man of the Tenor Sax".

Cobb then started his own seven-piece band, but suffered a serious illness in 1950, which necessitated spinal surgery. Although he re-formed the band upon his recovery, in 1956 its success was again interrupted, this time by a car crash. This had long-term effects on his health, involving periods in the hospital and making him permanently reliant on crutches. Nevertheless, Cobb worked as a soloist through the 1970s and 1980s in the U.S. and abroad. As late as 1988 he played with Jimmy Heath and Joe Henderson in Europe.

He died in his native Houston, aged 70, in 1989.

== Discography ==
- 1943–47: The Wild Man of the Tenor Sax, 1943–1947 (EPM Musique)
- 1946–47: The Chronological Arnett Cobb, 1946–1947 (Classics)
- 1947: Arnett Blows for 1300 (Delmark) 1994 compilation of Apollo recordings
- 1959: Blow Arnett, Blow (Prestige) also released as Go Power!!!
- 1959: Smooth Sailing (Prestige)
- 1959: Party Time (Prestige)
- 1959: Very Saxy (Prestige) with Eddie "Lockjaw" Davis, Coleman Hawkins and Buddy Tate
- 1960: More Party Time (Prestige)
- 1960: Movin' Right Along (Prestige)
- 1960: Sizzlin' (Prestige)
- 1960: Ballads by Cobb (Moodsville)
- 1973: Again with Milt Buckner, with Milt Buckner, Clarence Brown and Michael Silva (Black & Blue)
- 1974: Arnett Cobb and Tiny Grimes Quintet, Live in Paris (Esoldun - INA)
- 1974–76: The Wild Man from Texas (Black & Blue)
- 1978: Arnett Cobb Is Back (Progressive)
- 1978: Live at Sandy's! (Muse)
- 1980: Tenor Abrupt, at (The Definitive Black & Blue Sessions) with Guy Lafitte (Black & Blue)
- 1981: Funky Butt (Progressive)
- 1982: Arnett Cobb Live (in Holland) (Timeless)
- 1984: Keep on Pushin' (Bee Hive)
- 1987: Show Time, with Dizzy Gillespie and Jewel Brown (Fantasy)
- 1988: Tenor Tribute (in Germany), with Jimmy Heath and Joe Henderson (Soul Note)
- 1988: Tenor Tribute, Volume 2 (in Germany), with Jimmy Heath and Joe Henderson (Soul Note)

With Ruth Brown

- Ruth Brown (Atlantic, 1957)
- Miss Rhythm (Atlantic, 1959)

With Buddy Tate

- Live at Sandy's (Muse, 1978 [1980])

With Eddie "Cleanhead" Vinson

- Live at Sandy's (Muse, 1978 [1981])
- Hold It Right There! (Muse, 1978 [1984])

With Roseanna Vitro

- Listen Here (Texas Rose, 1984)
