= Chris Flory =

American jazz guitarist

- Born: November 13, 1953 (age 71); New York City, U.S.
- Genres: Jazz, swing
- Occupation: Musician
- Instrument: Guitar
- Years active: 1970s–present
- Labels: Concord, Arbors
- Website: chrisfloryjazz.com

Chris Flory (born November 13, 1953) is an American jazz guitarist.

== Early life and career ==
A native of New York City, Flory was playing guitar by his early teens and around that time heard his first jazz album, Forest Flower by Charles Lloyd. He was influenced by seeing Jimi Hendrix, B. B. King, and Rahsaan Roland Kirk live during the late 1960s. He met musicians through his friend Scott Hamilton and while babysitting the children of Gil Evans he listened to albums by Nat King Cole, Miles Davis, Charlie Parker, and Lester Young. In an interview with JazzTimes, Flory stated that his music has been inspired by Charlie Parker, Charlie Christian, T-Bone Walker, and Jimi Hendrix.

Flory played in rock bands in his early teens but three years later had a couple jazz lessons with guitarist Tiny Grimes. In the early 1970s he was a student at Hobart College. He performed with Hamilton intermittently from 1975 through the early 1990s. He began to record his own albums as a leader after Hamilton's quintet broke up. From 1977 to 1983 Flory played in the Benny Goodman Sextet. He has worked with Ruby Braff, Judy Carmichael, Roy Eldridge, Illinois Jacquet, Buddy Tate, Bob Wilber, Milt Hinton, Hank Jones, Duke Robillard, and Maxine Sullivan.

== Discography ==
=== As leader ===
- For All We Know (Concord Jazz, 1990)
- City Life (Concord Jazz, 1993)
- Word on the Street (Double Time, 1996)
- Blues in My Heart with Duke Robillard (Stony Plain, 2007)
- For You (Arbors, 2008)
- The Chris Flory Quintet Featuring Scott Hamilton (Arbors, 2011)

=== As sideman ===
With Ruby Braff

- A First (Concord Jazz, 1985)
- A Sailboat in the Moonlight (Concord Jazz, 1986)
- Mr. Braff to You (Phontastic, 1986)

With Scott Hamilton

- Scott Hamilton and Warren Vache with Scott's Band in New York City (Concord Jazz, 1978)
- Skyscrapers (Concord Jazz, 1980)
- Close Up (Concord Jazz, 1982)
- In Concert (Concord Jazz, 1983)
- The Second Set (Concord, 1984)
- The Right Time (Concord Jazz, 1987)
- Plays Ballads (Concord Jazz, 1989)

With Maxine Sullivan

- Uptown (Concord Jazz, 1985)
- Together (Atlantic, 1987)
- Swingin' Sweet (Concord Jazz, 1988)

With Bob Wilber

- Bob Wilber and the Scott Hamilton Quartet (Chiaroscuro, 1977)
- Dizzyfingers (Bodeswell, 1980)
- Bob Wilber and the Bechet Legacy (Bodeswell, 1981)

With others

- Harry Allen & Keith Ingham, The Intimacy of the Blues (Progressive, 1994)
- Harry Allen & Keith Ingham, My Little Brown Book (Progressive, 1994)
- Judy Carmichael, Trio (C&D, 1989)
- Doc Cheatham, Nonette Rare in Rehearsal (Squatty Roo, 2016)
- Buck Clayton, A Swingin' Dream (Stash, 1989)
- Rosemary Clooney, Sings the Music of Irving Berlin (Concord Jazz, 1984)
- Peter Ecklund, Strings Attached (Arbors, 1996)
- Susannah McCorkle, Thanks for the Memory (Pausa, 1984)
- Ben Paterson, That Old Feeling (Cellar Live, 2018)
- Flip Phillips, A Sound Investment (Concord Jazz, 1987)
- Flip Phillips, The Claw: Live at the Floating Jazz Festival (Chiaroscuro, 1991)
- Duke Robillard, Swing (Rounder, 1987)
- Loren Schoenberg, Time Waits for No One (Musicmasters, 1987)
