= Galatoire's =

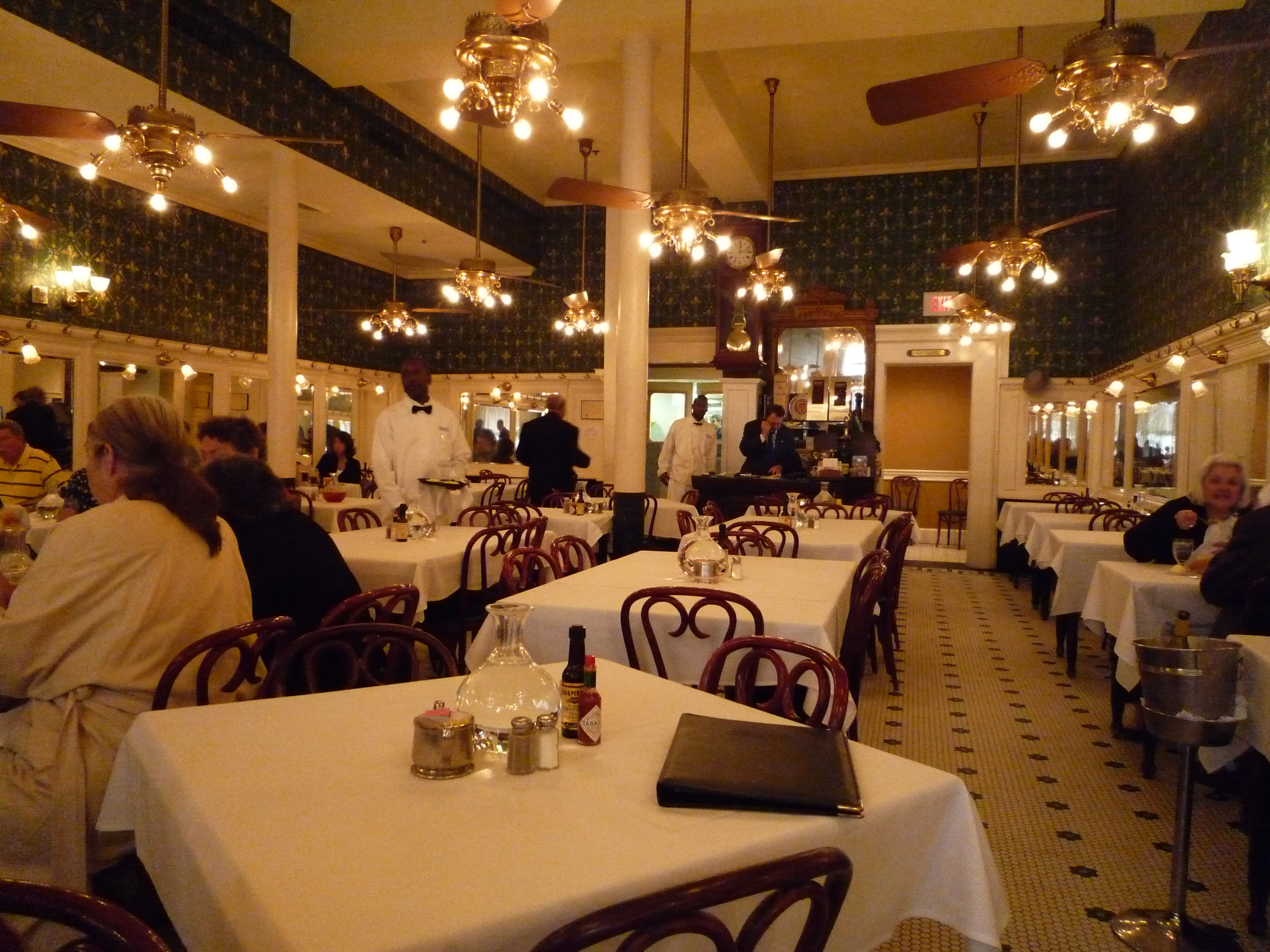
- The first floor dining room of Galatoire's.
- Interactive map of Galatoire's

Restaurant information
- Established: 1905; 121 years ago
- Head chef: Phillip Lopez
- Food type: Louisiana Creole cuisine
- Dress code: Galatoire's dress code is business casual for lunch. No shorts or t-shirts. Jackets are required for gentlemen starting at 5 p.m. nightly and all day Sunday.
- Location: 209 Bourbon Street, New Orleans, Louisiana, 70130, United States
- Coordinates: 29.9549°N 90.0690°W
- Website: Official Site

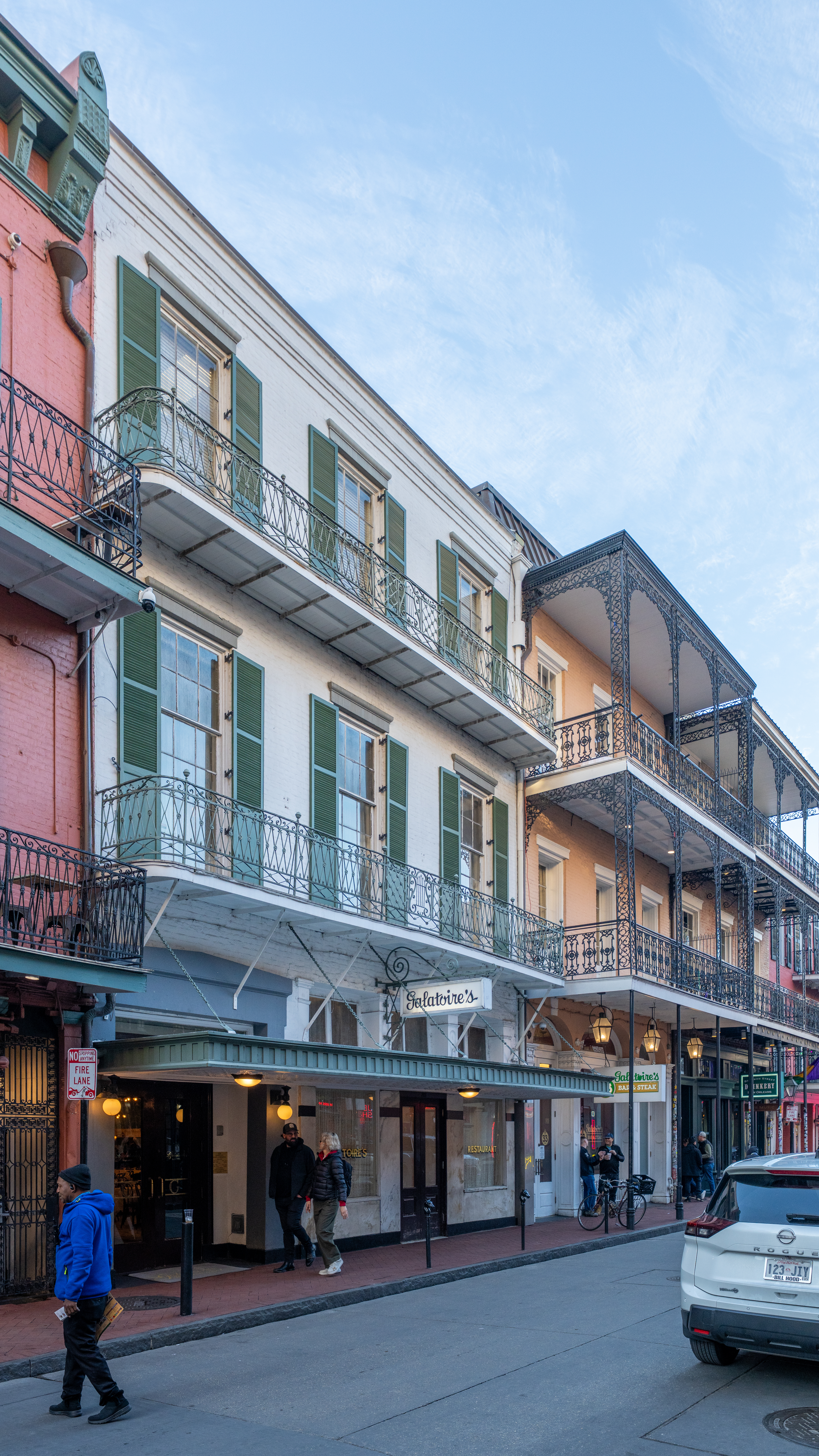
From Bourbon Street (2026)

Galatoire's is a French restaurant at 209 Bourbon Street in the French Quarter of New Orleans, Louisiana, United States.

== History ==
Jean Galatoire, an immigrant from a small village near Pau, France, in the foothills of the Pyrenees Mountains, established a "saloon on Canal Street" in 1896. In 1905, Galatoire purchased Victor's Restaurant, in business at the location since the mid-1800s. Galatoire renamed the restaurant and began cooking the dishes from his homeland. The restaurant is run by his fourth-generation descendants. Galatoire's specializes in French Creole cooking. The main entrance, a French door, leads into the first-floor dining room. The first-floor dining room is a mix of high ceilings, slow-moving paddle fans, and mirrored opposing walls, maintaining much of the look of a mid-19th century restaurant. The second-floor dining rooms, opened in 1999, comprise smaller rooms overlooking Bourbon Street. At lunch, men may dress casually, although after 5:00 PM, and all day on Sundays, men must wear a jacket.

In 2004, Galatoire's was cited by the James Beard Foundation as the "outstanding restaurant" in America.

Until 1999, the restaurant did not accept reservations, leaving patrons to stand in long lines on the Bourbon Street sidewalk. With the addition of the second-floor dining rooms and bar, standing on Bourbon Street is only needed for first-floor dining room seats, which are still always on a first-come-first-served basis. Exceptions to their first-come-first-served policy have never been allowed. According to the restaurant - One Friday then-President Ronald Reagan placed a call to then retired U.S. Senator J. Bennett Johnston, who happened to be waiting in line for a table. After the President’s call had ended, Senator Johnston graciously returned to his position in line.

Most of the waiters are long-time employees who are professionals and local to south Louisiana.

In 2005, a second restaurant, Galatoire's Bistro, opened just off Interstate-10 on the southern fringe of Baton Rouge.

In December 2009, the descendants of founder Jean Galatoire, who had owned the restaurant for five generations, sold a controlling interest in the business to Destrehan businessman Todd Trosclair. After a subsequent transaction, a majority of Trosclair's interest was sold to New Orleans businessman (and political candidate) John Georges. As a result of this sale, Georges became the largest, though not majority, shareholder. Trosclair, who became chair of the board of directors, noted that even he would have to wait in line. Five members of the Galatoire family remain as minority owners. The executive chef, as of September 2018, is Phillip Lopez.

== Galatoire's Monologues ==
On April 27, 2002, Gilberto Eyzaguirre was fired from Galatoire's. Eyzaguirre had worked as a waiter at the restaurant for more than 20 years, yet was dismissed after multiple sexual harassment complaints from the staff. Eyzaguirre's firing caused a huge controversy in New Orleans due to the dissatisfaction of the regular customers. The event became a social drama, and over 150 of the regular diners wrote letters against Eyzaguirre's dismissal, along with creating a website for him, and talking about it on radio talk shows.

There were two sides to this debate; that of the elites who were very against Eyzaguirre being fired as he was a long-time worker at Galatoire's, and that of the broader public backed up by lawyers, journalists, and the former U.S. Attorney, who viewed the dismissal as a fair one. A columnist from The Times-Picayune named Chris Rose decided to use all the letters written for the journal in a satirical reading named "Galatoire's Monologues." The satire took place in a cabaret and had many local celebrities as part of it. It was a huge success and many of the readings became sold out. In 2003, the readings were performed at a conference in Napa, California, at the museum of American Center for Wine, Food and the Art.

== See also ==
- List of French restaurants
- List of Louisiana Creole restaurants
