= James Henry Dolan =

American criminal (1914 – 1994)

James Henry "Doc" Dolan
- Born: 25 October 1914; Cedar Rapids, Iowa
- Died: 4 December 1984 (aged 70); San Antonio, Texas
- Occupation: Criminal

James Henry 'Doc' Dolan was a 20th-century American criminal.

== Biography ==
Dolan was born on 25 October 1914 in Cedar Rapids, Iowa.

As a young man Dolan worked in a Californian hotel for a year and became a structural iron worker before joining the army. In the late 1940s he spent time in Chicago where he associated with Felix Alderisio. In the early 1950s he moved to Miami Beach, Florida. Dolan was convicted of impersonating an Internal Revenue Service agent and put on probation. He arranged for a partner of his to set up poker games with local leaders in small communities. When the cash was on the table he would enter, pretend to be an IRS agent, and confiscate the money. After violating probation he was sent to Fort Leavenworth in Kansas, later being transferred to Seagoville federal correctional facility in Texas.

He was released in 1957 and relocated to Dallas. He worked a series of odd jobs, such as a carpet salesman and at Sears. In 1959 he became involved with the American Guild of Variety Artists (AGVA) and was appointed as a top union official. In this position he became acquainted with Jack Ruby, whose employees in the Carousel Club were AGVA members. He introduced Ruby to the singer Jewel Brown who sang at Ruby's club for about a year before they had a falling out. His employment was terminated in the early 60s because of his criminal activity. He was associated with local Dallasite organized criminals like R. D. Matthews, Joseph Campisi and Joseph Civello, as well as Nofio Pecora in Louisiana.

In 1961 Dolan was accused of using tear gas to rob a poker game in Beeville, taking at least $26,000. One of his sons was set to testify that on the night in question his father had been telling him bedtime stories about his childhood in Cedar Rapids, Iowa. In reality his son had no knowledge of where his father had been that night. When Dolan was no-billed by the grand jury his testimony became unnecessary. He had some ties with the Smaldone crime family in Denver, Michigan. Dolan was arrested along with Jess Bridewell, an associate of the Smaldones, in December 1963 for planning a jewelry robbery in Dallas.

Dolan would occasionally travel from Dallas around the country to do enforcement work for various organized crime figures. On one occasion he flew out to Miami Beach on behalf of Santo Trafficante Jr. Dolan and George Fuqua of the Dixie Mafia went out to deal with bolita men who were not doing as Trafficante had wanted. As payment they were allowed to keep whatever cash the bolita operators had in their possession. At the first stop they netted $7000 and then proceeded to the next where they were again successful, the next week they returned to Dallas.

In Las Vegas, July 1972, attorney William Coulthard was killed when four sticks of dynamite placed beneath the steering wheel blew up his Cadillac and four other cars in its vicinity. It was believed by the Las Vegas police that Dolan had carried out the bombing on behalf of Benny Binion. Dolan was imprisoned at Fort Leavenworth at the same time as Binion. Later on in the 1970s he went on the run after pulling a scam in Memphis, Tennessee. In 1973 an FBI informant implicated Dolan in the murder of two men who had stolen a dog from an associate of his a week before. On New Years Eve their bodies were found at a campground on the Elm Fork of the Trinity river. They had been shot in the head and their hands were tied behind their back with neckties.

On 4 December 1984 Dolan was murdered at his residence in San Antonio, Texas. He was shot with six 9mm bullets and $50,000 in cash was taken. The case remains unsolved. He was 70 years of age and is buried at Mission Park cemetery, San Antonio. He had three children, including the psychotherapist Jim Dolan who wrote an unpublished memoir of his father, My Father, the Hitman. Before his death he became a key witness in an FBI probe into organized crime in Southern Texas, Operation Bushmaster. A few hours prior to his shooting he had, through his attorneys, negotiated immunity in exchange for testifying before a grand jury.
