= Sizzlin' =

Studio album by Arnett Cobb
- Released: 1960
- Recorded: November 30, 1960
- Studio: Van Gelder Studio, Englewood Cliffs, New Jersey
- Genre: Jazz, Blues, Soul, Boogie Woogie
- Length: 38:42
- Label: Prestige; PRLP 7227
- Producer: Esmond Edwards

Arnett Cobb chronology
| Movin' Right Along (1960) | Sizzlin' (1960) | Ballads by Cobb (1960) |

Professional ratings
Review scores
| Source | Rating |
|---|---|
| Allmusic | 3/5 stars |

Sizzlin' is an album by saxophonist Arnett Cobb recorded in 1960 for the Prestige label.

== Reception ==
The Allmusic review awarded the album 3 stars.

== Track listing ==
(All compositions by Arnett Cobb except as indicated)

1. "Sweet Georgia Brown" (Ben Bernie, Kenneth Casey, Maceo Pinkard) - 5:06
2. "Black Velvet" (Illinois Jacquet) - 5:22
3. "Blue Sermon" - 7:43
4. "Georgia on My Mind" (Hoagy Carmichael, Stuart Gorrell) - 6:02
5. "Sizzlin'" - 7:34
6. "The Way You Look Tonight" (Dorothy Fields, Jerome Kern) - 6:55

== Personnel ==
- Arnett Cobb - tenor saxophone
- Red Garland - piano
- George Tucker - bass
- J. C. Heard - drums
