= Live at Sandy's! =

Live album by Arnett Cobb and the Muse Allstars
- Released: 1980
- Recorded: August 25–26, 1978
- Venues: Sandy's Jazz Revival, Beverly, MA
- Genre: Jazz
- Length: 61:42 CD release with additional tracks
- Labels: Muse; MR 5191
- Producer: Bob Porter

Arnett Cobb chronology
Arnett Cobb Is Back (1978)	Live at Sandy's! (1980)	Funky Butt (1980)

More Arnett Cobb and the Muse All Stars Live at Sandy's! Cover

Live at Sandy's! is a live album by saxophonist Arnett Cobb which was recorded at Sandy's Jazz Revival in 1978 and released on the Muse label in 1980. The 1996 CD reissue included tracks from More Arnett Cobb and the Muse All Stars Live at Sandy's!, while omitting one track from the original album due to time constraints.

== Reception ==
Professional ratings
Review scores
Source	Rating
AllMusic	4/5 stars
DownBeat	4/5 stars

The AllMusic review by Scott Yanow stated "During a two-day period in 1978, Muse Records fully documented a jam session featuring the tenors of Arnett Cobb and Buddy Tate, altoist Eddie "Cleanhead" Vinson, pianist Ray Bryant, bassist George Duvivier and drummer Alan Dawson. Six records resulted, two apiece headed by the three saxophonists. ... All of the sets in this rewarding series are recommended to straightahead and mainstream jazz fans.".

== Track listing ==
All compositions by Arnett Cobb except where noted.

1. "Just a Closer Walk with Thee" (Traditional) – 7:07
2. "Blue and Sentimental" (Count Basie, Jerry Livingston, Mack David) – 6:12
3. "Go Red Go" – 5:05 Originally Released on More Arnett Cobb and the Muse All Stars Live at Sandy's!
4. "On the Sunny Side of the Street" (Jimmy McHugh, Dorothy Fields) – 7:35
5. "Blues for Lester" – 11:17 Originally Released on More Arnett Cobb and the Muse All Stars Live at Sandy's!
6. "September Song" (Kurt Weill, Maxwell Anderson) – 7:47
7. "Broadway" (Billy Byrd, Teddy McRae, Henri Woode) – 10:35 Omitted from CD reissue
8. "Smooth Sailing" – 7:55 Originally Released on More Arnett Cobb and the Muse All Stars Live at Sandy's!
9. "Flying Home" (Benny Goodman, Lionel Hampton, Sid Robin) – 8:44 Originally Released on More Arnett Cobb and the Muse All Stars Live at Sandy's!

== Personnel ==
- Arnett Cobb – tenor saxophone
- Buddy Tate – tenor saxophone
- Eddie "Cleanhead" Vinson – alto saxophone
- Ray Bryant – piano
- George Duvivier – bass
- Alan Dawson – drums
