= Funky Butt (album) =

Studio album by Arnett Cobb
- Released: 1981
- Recorded: January 22, 1980
- Studio: The Big Apple Studio, NYC
- Genre: Jazz
- Length: 60:05 CD release with additional tracks
- Label: Progressive; P-7054
- Producer: Gus P. Statiras

Arnett Cobb chronology
Live at Sandy's! (1978)	Funky Butt (1981)	Arnett Cobb Live (1982)

Funky Butt is an album by saxophonist Arnett Cobb which was recorded in 1980 and released on the Progressive label. The 2014 CD reissue included three additional alternate takes.

== Reception ==
Professional ratings
Review scores
Source	Rating
AllMusic	3/5 stars

The AllMusic review by Scott Yanow stated "Arnett Cobb, a tenor from the 1940s who fused together some of the most exciting aspects of swing and early R&B, is in typically exuberant form on this quartet set ... Cobb is warm on the ballads but the stomps are what make this record most memorable".

== Track listing ==
1. "Jumpin' at the Woodside" (Count Basie) – 4:32
2. "Satin Doll, (Duke Ellington, Billy Strayhorn, Johnny Mercer) – 5:56
3. "Georgia on My Mind" (Hoagy Carmichael, Stuart Carroll) – 4:09
4. "Funky Butt" – 5:48
5. "I Got Rhythm" (George Gershwin, Ira Gershwin) – 6:25
6. "September in the Rain" (Harry Warren, Al Dubin) – 5:53
7. "Isfahan" (Strayhorn) – 6:10
8. "Radium Springs Swings" (James Newton) – 4:46
9. "Jumpin' at the Woodside" [Take 1] (Count Basie) – 4:27 Additional track on CD release
10. "Funky Butt Blues" [Take 1] (Cobb) – 7:25 Additional track on CD release
11. "I Got Rhythm" [Take 2] (Gershwin, Gershwin) – 4:34 Additional track on CD release

== Personnel ==
- Arnett Cobb – tenor saxophone
- Derek Smith – piano
- Ray Drummond – bass
- Ronnie Bedford – drums
