= Gallerie =

- Editor: Caffyn Kelley
- Frequency: Irregular
- Format: Print
- First issue: 1988
- Final issue: 1994
- Country: Canada
- Based in: Vancouver, BC
- ISSN: 0838-1658

Gallerie was a Canadian feminist art periodical published in Vancouver, B.C. from 1988 until 1994. Established and edited by lesbian artist Caffyn Kelley, the magazine primarily printed and promoted women's art and writing.

== Background & Content ==
According to the founder of the magazine, Caffyn Kelley, her identity as a lesbian was at the heart of Gallerie. As a writer and an artist with experience in printing and publishing, she felt she could contribute to the "women's community" by promoting women artists. And so, Gallerie provided a space for women to discuss their art and their lives in their own words.

In making the magazine, Kelley stressed the importance of celebrating difference instead of submitting to the dominant mainstream art culture. She wrote, "we increase our capacity for vision and invention by retaining and expressing our differences, much more than by uncovering our similarities. We don't need one voice to speak with, but many, more, and louder voices. Then we might set up a racket that reverberates through the apparatus of power, and makes some difference there."

Gallerie was distributed internationally and reviewed widely. The magazine accepted submissions from famous and unknown artists alike. Each issue featured portfolios of about 40 selected artists. They featured many various media, art forms ranging from paintings to photographs. Some women artists published by Gallerie include Jan Crawford, Renée Poisson, and Patricia Johanson.

== Alternative titles ==
Gallerie published under various titles:

- Gallerie: Women's Art (until Sept. 1990)
- Gallerie Annual
- Gallerie: Women Artists
- Gallerie: Women Artists Monographs
