= Earl Snakehips Tucker =

American dancer and entertainer

Earl "Snakehips" Tucker
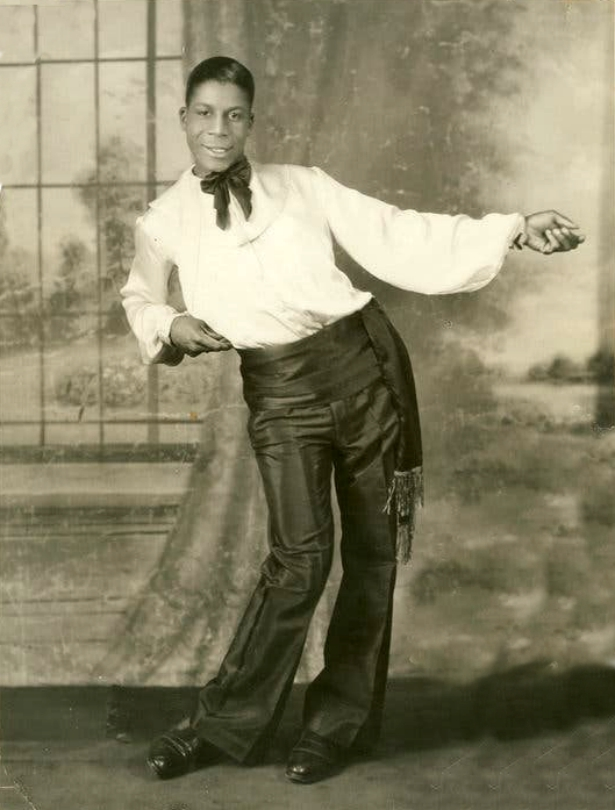
- Born: August 14, 1906; Baltimore, Maryland, U.S.
- Died: May 14, 1937 (aged 30); New York City, New York, U.S.
- Occupations: Dancer and entertainer
- Known for: Popularized the dance called the snakehips

Earl "Snakehips" Tucker (August 14, 1906 – May 14, 1937) was an American dancer and entertainer. Also known as the "Human Boa Constrictor", he acquired the nickname "snakehips" via the dance he popularized in Harlem in the 1920s called the "snakehips".

== Career ==
Tucker frequented Harlem music clubs and was a regular at the Savoy Ballroom. He built his reputation by exhibiting his odd style of dance, which involved a great deal of hip motion. Tucker would make it appear that he was as flexible as a snake, and eventually, the dance became his calling card. He became popular enough to eventually perform at Connie's Inn and the Cotton Club. The snakehips dates back to southern plantations before emancipation.

Riding this wave of popularity, in 1930 he appeared in Benny Rubin's 16-minute short film Crazy House, a comedic introduction to residents at the fictitious "Lame Brain Sanitarium". Tucker's two-minute dance number, performed in a shiny, white shirt and shiny, baggy gold pants, displays his amazing dance innovations, his style a precursor to modern street and stage dance. His name appears in the opening credits only as "Snake Hips". In 1935, Tucker appeared in a short film called Symphony in Black: A Rhapsody of Negro Life. The film was inspired by a Duke Ellington composition and included clips of Ellington composing, as well as Billie Holiday singing and Tucker doing the snakehips.

Earl Tucker performed the first standout solo dance routine in an MGM musical when he appeared, without credit, as a bellboy in Love in the Rough (1930).
