= Keep On Pushin' =

Studio album by Arnett Cobb
- Released: 1984
- Recorded: June 27, 1984
- Studio: JAC Studios, NYC
- Genre: Jazz
- Length: 36:37
- Label: Bee Hive Records BH 7017
- Producer: Bob Porter

Arnett Cobb chronology
Arnett Cobb Live (1982)	Keep On Pushin' (1984)	Show Time (1987)

Keep On Pushin' is an album by saxophonist Arnett Cobb which was recorded in 1984 and released on the Bee Hive label.

== Reception ==
Professional ratings
Review scores
Source	Rating
AllMusic	2.5/5 stars

The AllMusic review by Scott Yanow stated, "Arnett Cobb, at 66, still had plenty of energy as he demonstrates on this Bee Hive LP. ... This is an excellent mainstream set ".

== Track listing ==
No.	Title	Writer(s)	Length
1.	"Cheatin' on Me"	Lew Pollack, Jack Yellen	6:44
2.	"Blues for Lisette"	Arnett Cobb	5:16
3.	"Indiana"	James F. Hanley, Ballard MacDonald	5:21
4.	"Keep On Pushin'"	Bill Bell	9:59
5.	"Stardust"	Hoagy Carmichael, Mitchell Parish	6:54
6.	"Deep River"	Traditional	2:23
Total length:			36:37

== Personnel ==
- Arnett Cobb – tenor saxophone
- Joe Newman – trumpet (tracks 3 & 4)
- Al Grey – trombone (tracks 3 & 4)
- Junior Mance – piano
- George Duvivier – bass
- Panama Francis – drums
