= Jewel Brown =

American jazz and blues singer (1937–2024)

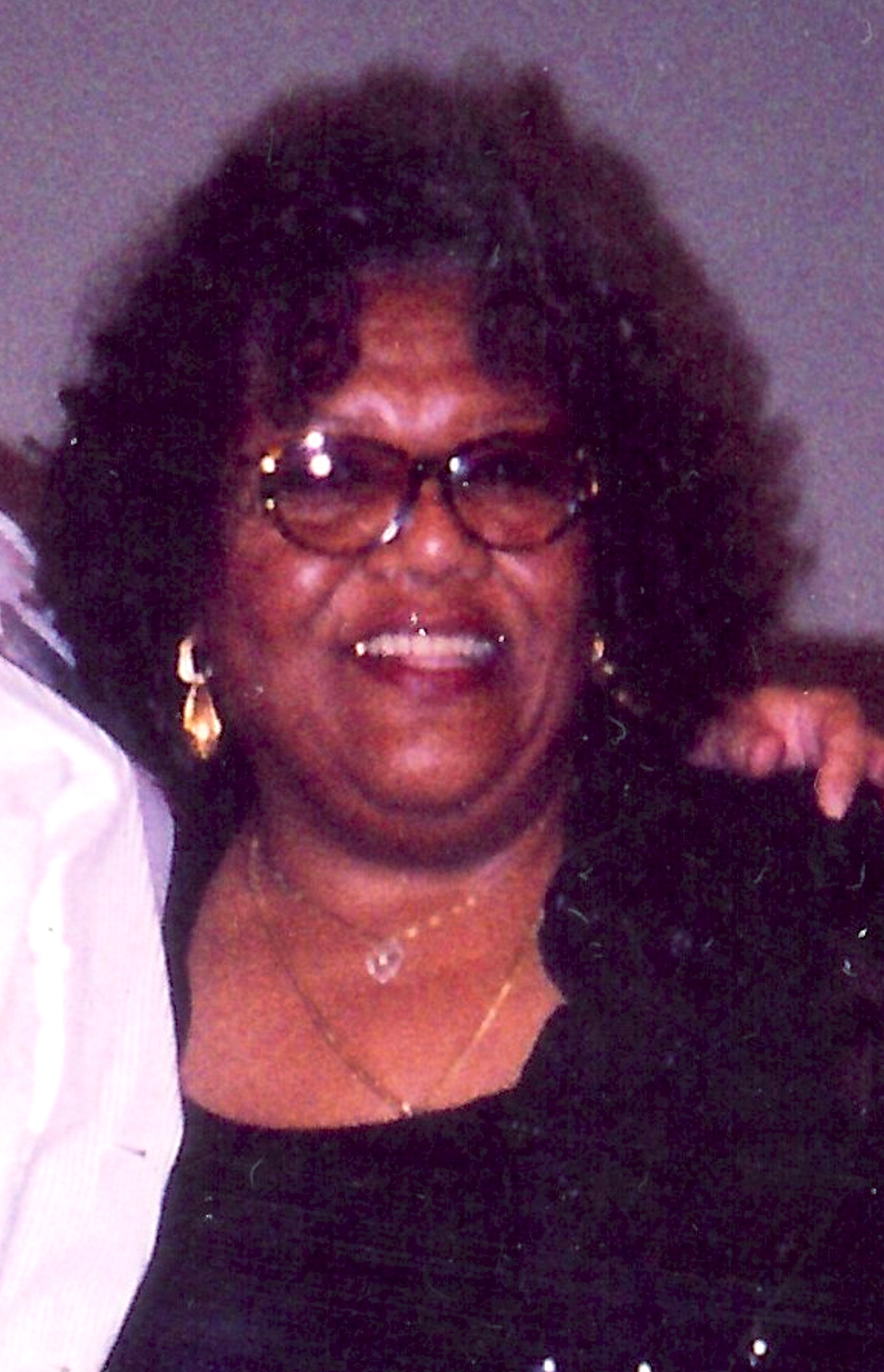
- Brown c. 2004

Background information
- Born: August 30, 1937; Houston, Texas, U.S.
- Died: June 25, 2024 (aged 86)
- Genres: Jazz, blues
- Occupation: Singer
- Years active: Late 1940s–2024

Jewel Brown (August 30, 1937 – June 25, 2024) was an American jazz and blues singer. She performed alongside artists such as Dizzy Gillespie and Louis Armstrong. Brown was inducted into the Blues Smithsonian Hall of Fame in 2007.

In 2013, Brown was nominated for a Blues Music Award in the 'Koko Taylor Award (Traditional Blues Female)' category.

== Early life and education ==
Brown was born in Houston and her family lived in Third Ward, Houston, where she attended Blackshear Elementary School.

== Early singing career ==
Brown began singing at the Manhattan Club in Galveston. She sang alongside Elmore Nixon and Henry Hayes, and also performed at Club Ebony. She won a talent show at age 9 at the Masonic Temple, which was located in Fourth Ward, Houston. Brown toured Australia and New Zealand in the 1960s with Louis Armstrong and his All Stars band as a featured Artist.

As a teenager, Brown continued performing in clubs around Houston and Galveston. She went on to join Louis Armstrong's band in the 1960s. She was introduced to Jack Ruby by James Henry Dolan of the American Guild of Variety Artists, Brown sang at Ruby's club for about a year before they had a falling out. Brown recalled "I filled that place seven nights a week, he never gave me a day off".

== Death ==
On June 26, 2024, Brown's publicist announced her death from colon cancer at the age of 86.

== Discography ==
=== As leader ===
- Show Time (Fantasy, 1988)
- Milton Hopkins & Jewel Brown (Dialtone, 2012)
- Rollercoaster Boogie (Dynaflow, 2014)

=== As guest ===
With Louis Armstrong

- Best Live Concert 1: Jazz in Paris (Verve)

== Videos ==
- With Louis Armstrong: Louis Armstrong – Live in Australia (DVD) (Euroarts)
