= Blues dance =

Family of historical dances that developed alongside and were danced to blues music

Young African Americans dancing in a juke joint in Mississippi

Blues dancing is a family of historical dances that developed alongside and were danced to blues music, or the contemporary dances that are danced in that aesthetic. It has its roots in African-American dance, which itself is rooted in sub-Saharan African music traditions and the historical dances brought to the United States by European immigrants.

Mura Dehn used the term "The Blues" in her documentary The Spirit Moves, Part 1, as the sub-section title of Chapter II, referencing different dance styles. African-American essayist and novelist Albert Murray used the term "blues-idiom dance" and "blues-idiom dance movement" in his book Stomping the Blues.

== History of blues dancing ==
=== Background ===
Blues dancing originated in the dances brought to America by enslaved Africans, who followed sub-Saharan African music traditions. There is no documented evidence across the history of pre-colonial sub-Saharan African dance for sustained one-on-one mixed-gender partnered dancing; African cultures apparently considered this type of dancing to be inappropriate.

Slavery in the United States had a great deal of influence on African-American dance, as people from widely disparate African cultures were thrown together during enslavement. As a result of this, their specific cultural traditions, including dances, were often lost or blended into a creolized African-American dance style. This dance style was also influenced by elements of British-European dances brought to the United States by European immigrants. Dance moves were passed down through generations of African Americans, revised and reworked, ultimately resulting in a specific African-American dance vocabulary. Over time, African-American dance became more formal than its African predecessors, but more energetic and dynamic than European dances.

During the post-Reconstruction period of approximately 1875–1900, as Jim Crow Laws were passed in the American South, dance steps began to lose their association with religion and spirituality and became thought of as purely secular. The dances of working-class and lower-class black people relinquished some of their Euro-American characteristics. Dances in this era became associated with the expression of pleasure and sexuality with one's partner, and the importance of communal group dancing was de-emphasized. The African style of dancing while bent over moved towards a more upright stance less tied to agrarian references and to facilitate partner connection.

=== Development of blues music ===
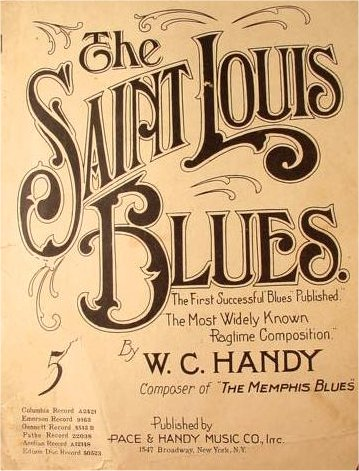
"Saint Louis Blues" by W. C. Handy, sheet music cover, 1914

W. C. Handy, who wrote some of the first published blues songs, documented an early experience he had with blues music at a dance that took place in Cleveland, Mississippi, around 1905. A local band consisting of three Black men with battered string instruments played a "haunting" song: "The dancers went wild." Later, Handy described a crowd's enthusiastic response to his own band playing blues music in 1909: "In the office buildings about, white folks pricked up their ears. Stenographers danced with their bosses. Everybody shouted for more." Later, he incorporated elements of habanera music into his blues music, because he had observed that Black people danced even more enthusiastically when these elements were present. In 1914, he played the song "Saint Louis Blues" for the first time. At the time, the tango was fashionable, so he used a tango-style introduction before transitioning suddenly into a blues style. As Handy recalled, after a moment's hesitation, the audience threw themselves into the dance with abandon.

At this point, blues began to come into its own as a genre. A tune called "Slow Drag Blues", composed by Snowden, was recorded c. 1915–19 by Dabney's Band. According to Albert Murray, blues-idiom dance movement has nothing to do with sensual abandonment. "Being always a matter of elegance [it] is necessarily a matter of getting oneself together. Practitioners of this style do not throw their bodies around; they do not cut completely loose. A loss of coolness and control places one squarely outside the tradition."

Dancing to blues music was sometimes called "slow dragging", a term that was used by Black dancers in Chicago through the 1940s. By the 1960s, the term "belly-rubbing" had gained acceptance. In the 1970s, both Black and white people began to refer to very close slow dancing between couples simply as "slow dancing". The degree of affection the partners had for each other generally determined how closely the partners danced, and there were widely varying levels of proficiency and styles of footwork.

In fact, the very nature of a vernacular dance culture ensures the survival of socially and culturally useful or valuable dances. Many of the steps specific to dances associated with popular blues songs of the 1920s were adapted for new musical structures in jazz, and new dance forms such as the lindy hop. Early African-American blues dances were very simple in their core movement and allowed for a wide variety of musical interpretation, embodying a black aesthetic approach to rhythm, movement and melody which permeated black music. They were often a simple one-step or two-step and though some movements may have been adapted and integrated into some mainstream popular dances, blues dancing as a distinct dance genre and social practice never became a specific focus for white America in the way that dances such as the Lindy Hop and Charleston have.

== Blues dancing style ==
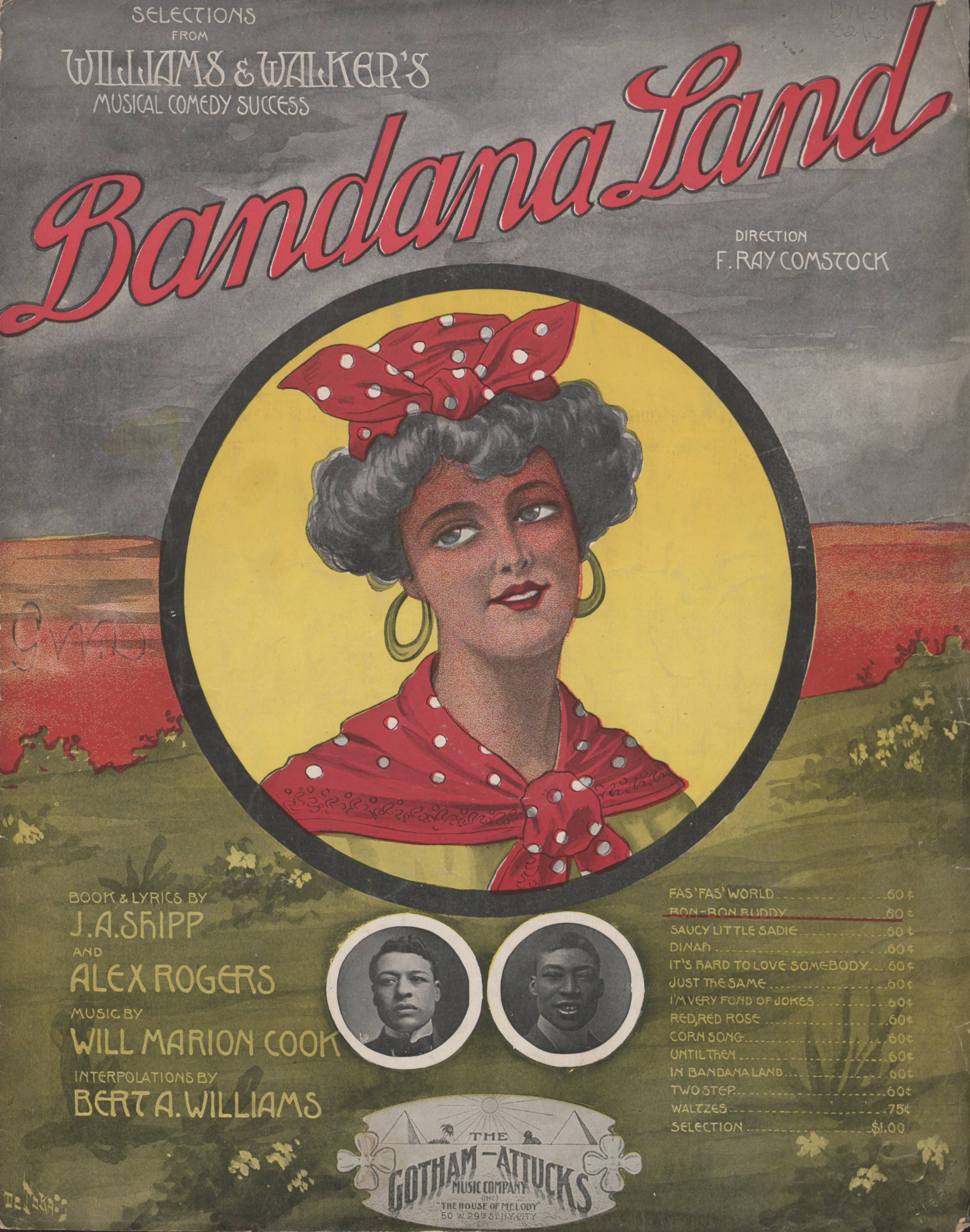
Cover of the song "Bon Bon Buddy" that closed Act 2 of the 1908 musical Bandanna Land. Bert Williams is in the photo on the lower left; George Walker on the lower right

Blues dances as a genre have been said to share a certain aesthetic:

- An athletic and grounded body posture and movement, characterized by the weight being held on the balls of the feet, the knees bent, the hips pushed back, and the chest forward.
- An asymmetry and polyphonic look/feel to the body, characterized by an equality of body parts. No limb or part has precedence, but they all work together both in a simultaneous and serialized fashion. The focus and weight shifting moves through various parts of the body; poly-centric.
- Rhythmic movement. Not just a single rhythm being used in/with the body, multiple meters or rhythms are used. Articulated movement in the torso (chest, rib cage, pelvis, buttocks) identifying and emphasizing different rhythms.
- Improvisation between dancers and on their own movements. Based on the rhythm section of the band.
- A drawing of the beats, dancing in the space between the beats, pushing and pulling creating a sense of tension both in the body and the body moving through space, while remaining loose and relaxed.

=== Specific moves or dances ===
The Ballroom, referenced by documentary filmmaker Mura Dehn, was a slow dance done by Lindy Hoppers at the Savoy Ballroom to Blues music and ballads. It is a slower, fluid, but highly rhythmic dance, involving lots of spins, lifts, and dips. Famous Lindy Hopper Sugar Sullivan described it as romantic.

In the Fish Tail, the movement of the buttocks forms a variety of figure eights, an element that originated in African dance. African dance generally discourages close bodily contact, so the use of this move in partner dances in the United States was considered obscene when it was first introduced. The Funky Butt was a similar move that involved "grinding" the rear end around. The Squat and Mooche were also performed with hip movements. Similar dances were popular in New York City by 1913.

The Slow Drag in its various forms was first documented during, and danced to the music of, the ragtime era.

Snake Hips is a movement in which the knees are moved forward and back one by one, while keeping the feet together, resulting in movement of the hips. As in Ball the Jack, a similar move in which the knees are held together, this results in a rotation of the hips.

The Strut is extremely similar to dances seen in South Africa, Ghana, and Nigeria. The Strut was often associated with cakewalking, another historical African-American dance.

== See also ==
- Juke joint
- Slow drag (dance)
- Earl Snakehips Tucker
- Ken "Snakehips" Johnson

== Bibliography ==
- DeFrantz, Thomas (2001). Dancing Many Drums: Excavations in African American Dance. Wisconsin: University of Wisconsin Press.
- Friedland, LeeEllen (1995). "Social Commentary in African American Movement Performance". In Farnell, Brenda (ed.). Human Action Signs in Cultural Context: The Visible and the Invisible in Movement and Dance. London: Scarecrow Press. pp. 136–57.
- Gottschild, Brenda Dixon (1996). Digging the Africanist Presence in American Performance. London: Greenwood Press.
- Handy, W. C. (1941). Bontemps, Arna (ed.). Father of the Blues: An Autobiography. Foreword by Abbe Niles. New York: Macmillan Company.
- Hazzard-Gordon, Katrina (1990). Jookin': The Rise of Social Dance Formations in African-American Culture. Philadelphia: Temple University Press. ISBN 087722613X. LCCN 89032004. OL 2209566M.
- Heckscher, Juretta Jordan (2009). "Our National Poetry: the Afro-Chesapeake Inventions of American Dance". In Malnig, Julie (ed.). Ballroom, Boogie, Shimmy Sham, Shake: A Social and Popular Dance Reader. Urbana: University of Illinois Press. ISBN 978-0-252-03363-6. OCLC 212908856.
- Hubbard, Karen; Monaghan, Terry (2009). "Negotiating Compromise on a Burnished Wood Floor: Social Dancing at the Savoy". In Malnig, Julie (ed.). Ballroom, Boogie, Shimmy Sham, Shake: A Social and Popular Dance Reader. Urbana: University of Illinois Press. ISBN 978-0-252-03363-6. OCLC 212908856.
- Hutchinson, Craig R. (1998). "Supplement". Swing Dancer: A Swing Dancer's Manual (1.17 ed.). Pontiac Swing Dance Club. ISBN 0-9620617-0-0.
- Jackson, Jonathan David (2001). "Improvisation in African-American Vernacular Dancing". Dance Research Journal. 33 (2). Congress on Research in Dance: 40–53. doi:10.2307/1477803. JSTOR 1477803. S2CID 190724670.
- Jones, Bessie; Hawes, Bess Lomax (1972). Step it Down: Games, Plays, Songs, and Stories From the Afro-American Heritage. New York. ISBN 0-06-011783-4. OCLC 340336.
- Malone, Jacqui (1996). Steppin' on the Blues: The Visible Rhythms of Black Dance. Chicago: University of Illinois Press. ISBN 0-252-02211-4.
- Murray, Albert (2000). Stomping the Blues. Da Capo Press. ISBN 0-306-80362-3.
- Pruter, Robert (1992). Chicago Soul. Chicago: University of Illinois Press. ISBN 0-252-06259-0.
- Stearns, Marshall Winslow; Stearns, Jean (1994) [1968]. Jazz Dance: The Story of American Vernacular Dance. With a foreword and afterword by Brenda Bufalino. Da Capo Press. ISBN 0-306-80553-7. LCCN 93040957.
- Szwed, John F.; Marks, Morton (1988). "The Afro-American Transformation of European Set Dances and Dance Suites". Dance Research Journal. 20 (1): 29. doi:10.2307/1478814. ISSN 0149-7677. JSTOR 1478814.
- Wald, Elijah (2004). Escaping the Delta: Robert Johnson and the Invention of the Blues. Amistad. ISBN 0060524235. OL 7277785M.
