= Gus Statiras =

- Born: July 6, 1922; Jersey City, New Jersey, US
- Origin: Jersey City
- Died: April 2, 2004 (aged 81)
- Occupations: music dealer, record producer, and briefly a New York radio disc jockey
- Years active: 1937–2004
- Spouse: Elizabeth Genelle Decker

Gus P. Statiras (July 6, 1922 – April 2, 2004) was a Greek–American music dealer, record producer, and briefly a New York radio disc jockey under the moniker "Gus Grant."

The founder of Progressive Records, Statiras produced and distributed jazz records in the 1950s. His label was bought and sold twice over twenty years, then re-emerged under Statiras in the 1970s and 1980s with Japanese backing for another run as an independent record label. Statiras sold it for a second time and then ran the label for Jazzology Records.

== Biography ==
The son of Greek immigrants, Statiras was born in Jersey City, New Jersey. His father owned several lunch stands in New York City. Jazz guitarist Marty Grosz told Jazzhouse, "You couldn't help but like Gus because he was so enthusiastic and charming."

He fell in love with jazz during the Great Depression. In 1937 he and a group of his friends skipped school to see the Benny Goodman big band that was performing at the Paramount Theater in New York City. Statiras went to work for Milt Gabler, the owner of the Commodore Record Shop in Manhattan.

While helping screen actress Greta Garbo, rising movie star Marlene Dietrich came into the store demanding to speak to Statiras. Dietrich wanted an introduction to the reclusive Garbo. He then found that Garbo and her friend had gone out the back way to avoid the introduction.

Statiras learned how to produce records from Gabler, who worked with guitarist Eddie Condon to bring musicians to Sunday afternoon jam sessions which Gabler would record. Gabler also picked up the rights to master recordings of music that other labels decided not to reissue, and then he would reissue them.

Statiras fought in World War II. He met his wife, Elizabeth Genelle Decker, while he was serving in the military. After the war he moved with her to Tifton, Georgia, and tried his hand at a few other enterprises, including running a hamburger stand. He began a music company called Mail Order Jazz which resold jazz records. He was often a seen at parties and events in New York and Florida. In the 1950s he moved from reselling to producing, founding Progressive Records, which released music by Cullen Offer, Zoot Sims, and Sonny Stitt.

The label was not economically viable after a few years and was sold to Savoy, which re-released much of the Progressive catalog. Savoy in turn sold it to Prestige. In the late 1970s Statiras bought the label back from Fantasy Records, owners of Prestige, and he ran the label independently with a support deal from Japanese record label Bainbridge.

Progressive did not endure as an independent label for much longer. It was bought by Statiras's friend George Buck, owner of Jazzology Records in the 1980s. Buck employed Statiras as a creative supervisor, developing albums with saxophonist J. R. Monterose and pianist Al Haig. He discovered an obscure album by a stride piano player, a woman from California named Judy Carmichael who had produced it but found no distributor. The album became Statiras's only Grammy nominee. In the 1980s, he ran the sub-label Statiras Records, which issued a few albums, including Jazz Piano by Judy Carmichael. He died on April 2, 2004, at 81 years of age in Milledgeville, Georgia, after the death of both of his sons.
