= Judy Carmichael =

American jazz pianist and vocalist

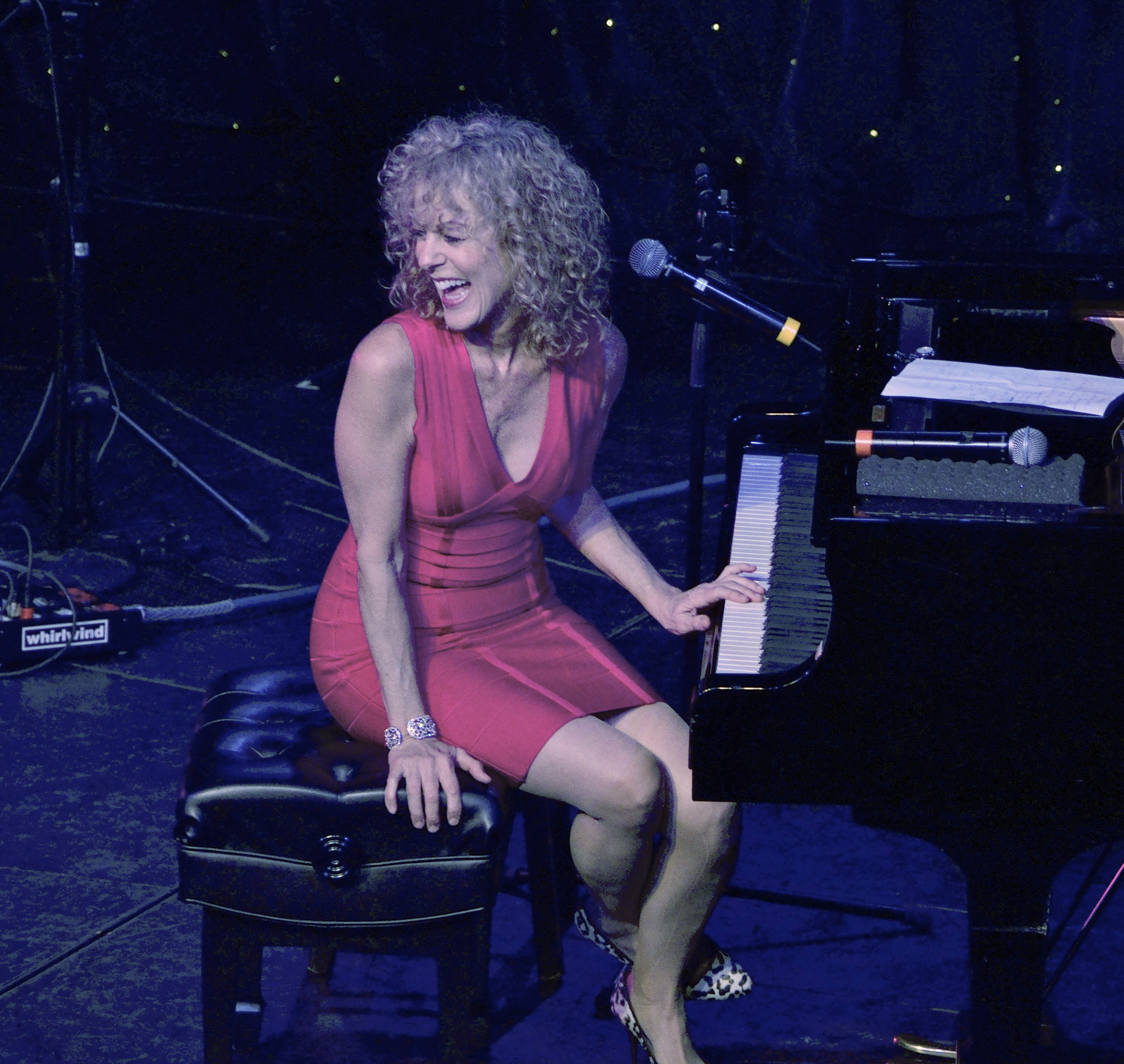

Background information
- Born: Judith Lea Hohenstein; November 27, 1957 (age 68); Lynwood, California, U.S.
- Genres: Jazz, Ragtime, Stride (music)
- Occupation: Musician
- Instruments: Piano, vocals
- Years active: 1960s–present
- Labels: Progressive, C&D
- Website: www.judycarmichael.com

Judy Carmichael (born Judith Lea Hohenstein, November 27, 1957) is a Grammy-nominated jazz pianist and vocalist who specializes in a form of early jazz called Stride Piano. She is also the host of a long-running jazz program aired on National Public Radio.

== Biography ==
=== Early life ===
Carmichael was born Judith Lea Hohenstein in suburban Southern California on November 27, 1957. She was taught piano by her mother from around age 4, and had two years of formal piano training. Her first public performance on piano, at the age of 17, was at UCLA's Royce Hall, sharing billing with Edgar Bergen, Jo Stafford and Paul Weston.

Carmichael has said her love of ragtime began when her grandfather offered $50 to his first grandchild who could play "Maple Leaf Rag". She taught herself to play it "note by note".

My grandfather said he'd give $50 to any of his grandchildren who could play "Maple Leaf Rag" [...] I told my piano teacher that I wanted to learn it, but she refused to teach it to me. She said I wasn't good enough. So I taught myself. I learned it note by note. As soon as I'd learned it, I played it for my grandfather, took the $50 and quit taking lessons.

=== Professional career ===
Carmichael attended California State University, Fullerton as a German Major and later Cal State Long Beach as a Communications Major. She continued to work as a professional ragtime pianist in her early 20s, eventually shifting to jazz. She performed ragtime and stride at Disneyland for five years. There she met trumpeter Jackie Coon, a Los Angeles studio musician, who encouraged her and pointed Basie drummer Harold Jones her way when he was substituting at Disneyland. Through Jones she met guitarist Freddie Green and vocalist Sarah Vaughan, and all of them, Vaughan in particular, encouraged her to make a record.

While seeking a recording session with a label in New York City, Carmichael sat in at a Roy Eldridge concert. After hearing her play, Eldridge recommended her to Dick Wellstood and to Tommy Flanagan. Eldridge remained a supporter of Carmichael and sent her music to play.

She shared a bill with Eubie Blake in a performance for the Los Angeles ragtime association, The Maple Leaf Club.

In the early 1980s Carmichael lived in New York and California, keeping the Disney gig and working in Los Angeles and Manhattan clubs and European festivals. She moved to New York full-time in 1985.

Carmichael tried to break into the jazz scene in Los Angeles, but she found most of the jazz clubs were male-dominated and intimidating. She was the first female instrumentalist to be hired by Disneyland and she had to share a dressing room with 10 men. No other female instrumentalist was hired during Carmichael's five years at Disney, and she was always the only woman instrumentalist at jazz festivals. She shared the stage with Marian McPartland on McPartland's Piano Jazz in 1988.

== Stride Piano ==
In stride piano, the pianist alternates between playing bass notes on the first and third beats and chords on the second and fourth beats with the left hand, while playing figures and improvised lines with the right hand. It is a physical style of playing associated with James P. Johnson and Willie "The Lion" Smith. Carmichael told The New York Times, "What made me unusual when I started doing that was that all the people playing stride were big men, and I was a surfer girl from California." Count Basie was so taken with Carmichael's playing that he gave her the nickname "Stride".

Reviewing her 1980 first album, Two-Handed Stride, Scott Yanow wrote: "The recording debut of pianist Judy Carmichael was a major, if somewhat unheralded event. The first important stride pianist to emerge in nearly 30 years, Carmichael has proved to be a consistently creative and exciting performer (rather than imitative), within the genre of classic jazz and swing during the years since her debut." For this set, originally released on Progressive and reissued on CD, Carmichael was joined by altoist Marshall Royal, guitarist Freddie Green, bassist Red Callender, and drummer Harold Jones, which Yanow felt gave some of the music a Count Basie feel. He said highlights included "Christopher Columbus", "Honeysuckle Rose", "A Handful of Keys" and "I Would Do Anything for You."

== Radio and TV ==
Carmichael has been a guest performer on Garrison Keillor's A Prairie Home Companion, and radio broadcasts on NPR's Morning Edition. She primarily appears on radio as the host of Public Radio's Judy Carmichael's Jazz Inspired, a radio program that interviews people from all walks of life who talk about their creative process, and how their interest in jazz has affected that process.

On television, she has appeared on Entertainment Tonight and CBS Sunday Morning, both with host Charles Kuralt and with Charles Osgood.

Her show appears on American public radio, as well as Sirius/XM's NPR Now channel. She also writes articles for JazzTimes. She produced and hosted a fifteen-part series for public radio: Pet Style Radio with Judy Carmichael.

Carmichael is the nationally syndicated host of Judy Carmichael's Jazz Inspired, a National Public Radio and Sirius/XM show and podcast that debuted in 1993 and broadcasts on more than 170 stations throughout North America. It is also broadcast on Sirius XM Satellite Radio's NPR NOW Channel and abroad. The show celebrated its 20th anniversary in 2013. She has interviewed numerous celebrities, including an interview with Raiders of the Lost Ark actress Karen Allen, actor Chevy Chase, singer Tony Bennett, rock pianist Billy Joel, actors John Lithgow, Robert Redford, F. Murray Abraham, and others.

=== Festivals and concerts ===
Carmichael has played major festivals and concert halls internationally. She has toured for United States State Department in Australia, India, Portugal, Brazil, Morocco, and Singapore. In 1992, she was the first jazz musician sponsored by the United States Government to tour China.

Her performances include Carnegie Hall, Jazz Festival 2008 Brazil, Jazz at Lincoln Center's Fats Waller Festival Peggy Guggenheim Museum, Tanglewood Jazz Festival, and 92d Street Y's Jazz in July. She made her debut as a vocalist on September 10, 1996, at the Tavern on the Green restaurant in New York City with Steve Ross.

=== Recording ===
Carmichael made her recording debut on Progressive in 1980. She has recorded 13 albums, two for larger labels. The majority were released on her label, C&D Productions. Her debut album, Two Handed Stride, was recorded with Basie sidemen Marshal Royal, Freddie Green, Red Callender, and Harold Jones and was nominated for a Grammy Award. The tracks on this album and her second, Jazz Piano, were rereleased in a CD compilation on C&D Productions label.

Her 2008 album Southern Swing was recorded live at the Wangaratta Festival of Jazz. On I Love Being Here With You, her first all-vocal CD, released in 2013, the piano parts were played by Mike Renzi (formerly music director for Peggy Lee, Mel Tormé, Tony Bennett and Sesame Street). Carmichael followed this with her first CD of originals, Can You Love Once More? Judy & Harry play Carmichael & Allen, (music Harry Allen, lyrics Judy Carmichael).

== Other work ==
Carmichael has given private recitals for Rod Stewart, Robert Redford, President Bill Clinton, and Gianni Agnelli. She has appeared with Joel Grey, Michael Feinstein, Dick Hyman, Marcus Roberts, Steve Ross, and the Smothers Brothers. At her first major European jazz festival in Nice, France, she performed two piano concerts with John Lewis, Francois Rilhac, and Joe Bushkin.

Carmichael has served on a variety of music panels at the National Endowment For the Arts. She has spoken before the National Council on the Arts and she has been an advocate for fellowship grants for individual performers. She oversaw music education activities for the Port Jeff Education and Arts Conservancy, a community center in Port Jefferson, New York, near her home in Sag Harbor. In 2000, Carmichael created her own radio show/podcast, Judy Carmichael's Jazz Inspired, which she continues to host and produce. She interviews celebrated artists about their love for jazz and how it inspired them. The show, now in its 23rd year, is carried on NPR and SiriusXm.https://www.jazzinspired.com/

== Awards and honors ==
Carmichael received several grants from the National Endowment for the Arts (NEA). Projects have included a documentary of early jazz musicians, and a project to discuss the history and development of jazz piano with college students nationwide.

She has been honored as a Steinway Artist. In 1992, Carmichael became the first jazz musician sponsored by the United States Government to tour China.

Her album Two Handed Stride was nominated for a Grammy Award.

== Discography ==
Year recorded	Title	Label	Notes
1982	Two Handed Stride	Progressive	With Marshal Royal (alto sax), Freddie Green (guitar), Red Callender (bass), Harold Jones (drums)
1984	Jazz Piano		Solo piano
1985 (?)	Pearls	Statiras	With Warren Vache (cornet), Howard Alden (guitar), Red Callender (bass); reissued by Jazzology
1988	Chops	C&D	Solo piano
1991	Old Friends	C&D	With Warren Vache (cornet), Howard Alden (guitar)
1989	Trio	C&D	With Michael Hashim (alto sax, soprano sax), Chris Flory (guitar)
1993	And Basie Called Her Stride	C&D	
1994	Judy	C&D	With Chris Flory (guitar)
1997	High on Fats and Other Stuff	C&D	Trio, with Michael Hashim (soprano sax, alto sax), Chris Flory (guitar)
2008	Southern Swing		Live performance in Australia with Stephen Grant (cornet) and John Scurry (guitar)
2008	Come and Get It	C&D	
2013	I Love Being Here With You	C&D	With Harry Allen (tenor sax), Mike Renzi (piano), Jay Leonhart (bass); Carmichael is on vocals only
2016	Can You Love Once More	C&D	With Harry Allen (tenor sax), Mike Renzi (piano), Alvin Atkinson (drums), Mike Karn (bass)

Main source:

== Books ==
- You Can Play Authentic Stride Piano
- Introduction to Stride Piano

Her arrangement of "Ain't Misbehavin'" appears in an anthology of jazz standards:

- Steinway & Sons Vol. 4: Piano Stylings of the Great Standards
- Swinger!: A Jazz Girl's Adventures from Hollywood to Harlem
