= Progressive Records =

American jazz record label

- Parent company: Jazzology
- Founded: 1950
- Founder: Gus Statiras
- Genre: Jazz
- Country of origin: U.S.
- Location: New Orleans, Louisiana
- Official website: jazzology.com

Progressive Records is an American jazz record company and label owned by the Jazzology group. It produces reissues and compilations of musicians such as Sonny Stitt, Eddie Barefield, George Masso, and Eddie Miller.

== History ==
Progressive Records was founded by Gus Statiras in New York in 1950. When the business declined, Savoy bought and reissued much of the label's catalog, then sold it to Prestige with backing from Bainbridge, a Japanese record company.

Progressive had a revival in the late 1970s when Statiras bought the label back from Fantasy, which by then had absorbed Prestige, which continued into the 1980s. Progressive's second era included recordings by Buddy DeFranco, Scott Hamilton, J. R. Monterose, and Al Haig.

In the 1980s, Progressive was acquired by George Buck and his Jazzology group and is owned by the George H. Buck Jr. Jazz Foundation.

== Roster ==
- Harold Ashby
- Harry Allen
- Eddie Barefield
- Joe Beck
- Walter Bishop Jr.
- Pete Brown
- Milt Buckner
- John Bunch
- Conte Candoli
- Pete Candoli
- Judy Carmichael
- Bill Charlap
- Arnett Cobb
- Al Cohn
- Chris Connor
- Buddy DeFranco
- Dorothy Donegan
- Harry Edison
- Tal Farlow
- Tommy Flanagan
- Bud Freeman
- Don Friedman
- Joel Futterman
- Harry Gibson
- Urbie Green
- Al Grey
- Sadik Hakim
- Al Haig
- Scott Hamilton
- Roland Hanna
- Billy Hart
- Eddie Higgins
- Milt Hinton
- Keith Ingham
- Illinois Jacquet
- Hank Jones
- Jon-Erik Kellso
- Roberta Kelly
- Lee Konitz
- Don Lamond
- Carmen Leggio
- Mundell Lowe
- Junior Mance
- Stan Mark
- George Masso
- Jimmy Maxwell
- Dave McKenna
- Jimmy McPartland
- Butch Miles
- J. R. Monterose
- George Mraz
- Vaughn Nark
- Walter Norris
- Red Norvo
- Niels-Henning Ørsted Pedersen
- Knocky Parker
- Flip Phillips
- Sammy Price
- Jack Reilly
- Sammy Rimington
- Jimmy Rowles
- Zoot Sims
- Carol Sloane
- Derek Smith
- Stuff Smith
- Martial Solal
- Hal Stein
- Sonny Stitt
- Buddy Tate
- Ross Tompkins
- Charlie Ventura
- Mal Waldron
- George Wallington
- Bill Watrous
- Chuck Wayne
- Ben Webster
- Dick Wellstood
- Frank Wess
- Bob Wilber
- Mary Lou Williams
- Roy Williams

== Catalogue ==
- PCD-7001 The Horn, Ben Webster
- PCD-7002 Love for Sale, Derek Smith Trio
- PCD-7003 Figure & Spirit, Lee Konitz Quintet
- PCD-7004 Arigato, Hank Jones
- PCD-7009 Complete World Broadcasting Jam Sessions 1944 (contains alternate takes, incomplete Takes, false Starts), Pete Brown & His Orchestra
- PCD-7014 Buddy DeFranco, Buddy DeFranco
- PCD-7015 The Two Progressive Trumpet Spectaculars, Various Artists
- PCD-7016 Let's Fall in Love, Jimmie Maxwell and His Jazz Gentlemen
- PCD-7017 Milt Buckner With Illinois Jacquet, Buddy Tate, Sonny Payne, Joop Scholten, Milt Buckner
- PCD-7018 The Good Life, Danny Moss, Jack Jacobs, The Fourteen Foot Band
- PCD-7019 The Progressive Records All Star Tenor Sax and Trombone Spectaculars, Various Artists
- PCD-7022 Introducing Ben Aronov, Ben Aronov
- PCD-7024 Ornithology, Al Haig
- PCD-7026 The Grand Appearance, Scott Hamilton
- PCD-7028 Buddy Tate-Harry "Sweets" Edison, Buddy Tate, Harry "Sweets" Edison
- PCD-7031 Bird Tracks, Roland Hanna
- PCD-7034 Sonny Stitt Meets Sadik Hakim, Sonny Stitt & Sadik Hakim
- PCD-7035 The Man I Love, The Derek Smith Quartet
- PCD-7036 Hot Knepper and Pepper, Don Friedman
- PCD-7037 Arnett Cobb Is Back, Arnett Cobb
- PCD-7042 Harry (the Hipster) Gibson and His Band, Harry Gibson
- PCD-7043 Invitation, The Don Friedman Trio
- PRO-7047 Richard Carr String Variations, Richard Carr
- PCD-7050 Hal Stein-Warren Fitzgerald Quintet, Hal Stein, Warren Fitzgerald
- PRO-7051 John Donaldson Parousia, John Donaldson
- PCD-7052 Dick Meldonian Quartet, Dick Meldonian
- PCD-7053 The 1943 Trio World Jam Session Recordings, Stuff Smith
- PCD-7054 Funky Butt, Arnett Cobb
- PCD-7055 The Derek Smith Trio Plays Jerome Kern, Derek Smith
- PCD-7059 The Magnificent Tommy Flanagan, Tommy Flanagan
- PCD-7060 Mal 81, Mal Waldron
- PRO-7062 Dick Meldonian-Sonny Igoe And Their Big Swing Jazz Band – Plays Gene Roland Music, Dick Meldonian, Sonny Igoe
- PCD-7065 Two-Handed Stride, Judy Carmichael
- PCD-7074 Sammy Price and His Blusicians, Sammy Price
- PCD-7075 Something Wonderful, Ronny White Trio
- PCD-7077 The Exciting Sax of Sammy Rimington, Sammy Rimington
- PCD-7079 Peter Burman Presents Tubby Hayes, Tony Coe
- PCD-7080 Bob Wilber-Dick Wellstood Duet, Bob Wilber, Dick Wellstood
- PCD-7082 How Long Has This Been Going On?, Harry Allen
- PCD-7084 Back to Basics, Milt Hinton Trio
- PCD-7085 Blowing Up a Storm, Jack Millman
- PCD-7086 Cullen Offer, Cullen Offer
- PCD-7088 More Exciting Sax, Sammy Rimington
- PCD-7090 A.K.A The Phantom, Ross Tompkins
- PCD-7091 Feather Merchant, Cullen Offer
- PCD-7092 Bill Charlap/Sean Smith, Bill Charlap, Sean Smith
- PCD-7093 Claude Williams, Claude Williams
- PCD-7094 The Dick Hafer Quartet, The Dick Hafer Quartet
- PCD-7095 On the Edge, The Gene Estes Quartet
- PCD-7096 Silhouettes, Joel Futterman
- PCD-7097 Bob Wilber: A Man and His Music, Bob Wilber
- PCD-7098 Shades of Things to Come, Jack Millman
- PCD-7100 King of Kansas City, Claude Williams
- PCD-7101 The Harry Allen-Keith Ingham Quintet Vol. 1, The Harry Allen-Keith Ingham Quintet
- PCD-7102 The Harry Allen-Keith Ingham Quintet Vol. 2, The Harry Allen-Keith Ingham Quintet
- PCD-7103 Ross Tompkins, Ross Tompkins
- PCD-7104 Cullen Offer, Tenor Saxophone; George Oldziey, Piano; Dan Hall, Bass, Cullen Offer, George Oldziey, Dan Hall
- PCD-7105 Jane Jarvis, Piano Jay Leonhart, Bass, Jane Jarvis, Jay Leonhart
- PCD-7106 A Tribute to Benny Goodman By Ken Peplowski, Shoeless John Jackson Quartet
- PCD-7107 Celebrates the Music of Harold Arlen - Solo Piano, Ross Tompkins
- PCD-7108 Echoes of New Orleans, Al Grey
- PCD-7109 The Brooklyn Four Plus One, The Brooklyn Four Plus One
- PCD-7110 Zoot Sims, Zoot Sims
- PCD-7111 Ronnie Bedford, Ronnie Bedford
- PCD-7112 Vibes a la Red, Red Norvo Combo
- PCD-7113 John's Bunch, John Bunch
- PCD-7114 The Best Thing for You Would Be The Cullen Offer Quartet, Cullen Offer Quartet
- PCD-7116 Mundell Lowe All Stars With Roger Kellaway & Jimmy Rowles, California Guitar
- PCD-7118 Featuring Deane and The Jazz Masters, Deane's Basics
- PCD-7120 Milt Hinton, Milt Hinton
- PCD-7121 The Second Time Around, Red Norvo Combo
- PCD-7122 From the Top, The Condoli Brothers
- PCD-7123 quadrumvirate, Ronnie Bedford & Friends
- PCD-7124 The Three Horns of Herb Steward, Marky's Vibes, Herb Steward
- PCD-7132 Red Norvo in New York, Red Norvo Quintet
- PCD-7134 The John Bunch Quintet, The John Bunch Quintet
- PCD-7135 No Holds Barred, Dave McKenna
- PCD-7136 Ronnie Bedford Quartet, Ronnie Bedford
- PCD-7137 Butch Miles Salutes Chick Webb, Butch Miles
- PCD-7138 November, Jack Reilly Trio
- PCD-7139 Passport to Brooklyn, Passport to Brooklyn
- PCD-7140 George Chisholm's All Stars, George Chisholm
- PCD-7141 Kenny Baker's All Stars/The Dick Morrissey Quartet, Kenny Baker, Dick Morrissey
- PCD-7142 Mary Lou Williams: The Circle Recordings, Mary Lou Williams
- PCD-7144 Peter Comton Big Band/Pat Hawes & His Band, Peter Comton, Pat Hawes
- PCD-7145 Warren Chiasson, Warren Chiasson
- PCD-7146 Quiet Storm in New Orleans, Warren Battiste
- PCD-7147 I'll Play for You, Bill Watrous Quartet and The Bill Watrous Combo in Hollywood
- PCD-7148 High On an Open Mike, Charlie Ventura
- PCD-7149 Constellation, The Struggles All-Stars
- PCD-7150 The George Masso Sextet With Eddie Miller, George Masso
- PCD-7151 The Eddie Barefield Sextet, Eddie Barefield
