= Tommy Flanagan discography =

Tommy Flanagan was an American jazz pianist. His appearances on record date from 1956 to 2001 and include more than 30 albums under his own name and more than 200 as a sideman.

== Discography ==
=== As leader/co-leader ===
Year recorded	Title	Label	Year released	Personnel/Notes
1957	Overseas	Prestige	1958	Trio, with Wilbur Little (bass), Elvin Jones (drums)
1957	The Cats	New Jazz	1959	The Prestige All Stars: Also with Idrees Sulieman (trumpet), John Coltrane (tenor sax), Kenny Burrell (guitar), Doug Watkins (bass), Louis Hayes (drums)
1959	Lonely Town	Blue Note	1979	Trio, with Joe Benjamin (bass), Elvin Jones (drums)
1960	The Tommy Flanagan Trio	Moodsville	1960	Trio, with Tommy Potter (bass), Roy Haynes (drums)
1974	Solo Piano	Storyville	2005	Solo
1975	The Tommy Flanagan Tokyo Recital	Pablo	1975	Trio, with Keter Betts (bass), Bobby Durham (drums)
1976	Trinity	Inner City	1980	Trio, with Ron Carter (bass), Roy Haynes (drums)
1977	Eclypso	Enja	1980	Trio, with George Mraz (bass), Elvin Jones (drums)
1977	Montreux '77	Pablo	1977	Trio, with Keter Betts (bass) Bobby Durham (drums); in concert
1977	Alone Too Long	Denon	1978	Solo
1978	Our Delights	Galaxy	1979	Duo, with Hank Jones (piano)
1978	More Delights	Galaxy	1985	Duo, with Hank Jones (piano)
1978	Something Borrowed, Something Blue	Galaxy	1978	Trio, with Keter Betts (bass), Jimmie Smith (drums)
1978	Tommy Flanagan Plays the Music of Harold Arlen	Trio	1979	Trio, with George Mraz (bass), Connie Kay (drums); Helen Merrill (vocals) added on one track
1977–78	Confirmation	Enja	1982	Some tracks trio, with George Mraz (bass), Elvin Jones (drums); some tracks duo, with Mraz
1978	Ballads & Blues	Enja	1978	Duo, with George Mraz (bass)
1978	The Super Jazz Trio	Baystate	1978	Trio, with Reggie Workman (bass), Joe Chambers (drums)
1978	Together	Denon	1979	Duo, with Kenny Barron (piano)
1979	Something Tasty	Baystate	1979	Quartet, with Art Farmer (flugelhorn), Reggie Workman (bass), Joe Chambers (drums)
1979	Communication: Live at Fat Tuesday's New York, Vol. 1	Paddle Wheel	1980	Trio, with Jerry Dodgion (alto sax, soprano sax), Red Mitchell (bass); in concert
1979	Communication: Live at Fat Tuesday's New York, Vol. 2	Paddle Wheel	1981	Trio, with Jerry Dodgion (alto sax, soprano sax), Red Mitchell (bass); in concert
1980	Super-Session	Enja	1980	Trio, with Red Mitchell (bass), Elvin Jones (drums)
1980	The Standard	Baystate	1980	Trio, with Reggie Workman (bass), Joe Chambers (drums)
1980	You're Me	Phontastic	1980	Duo, with Red Mitchell (bass)
1981	...And a Little Pleasure	Uptown	1981	Duo, with J. R. Monterose (tenor sax, soprano sax)
1981	The Magnificent Tommy Flanagan	Progressive	1981	Trio, with George Mraz (bass), Al Foster (drums)
1982	Giant Steps	Enja	1982	Trio, with George Mraz (bass), Al Foster (drums)
1982	The Magic of 2	Resonance	2013	Most tracks duo, with Jaki Byard (piano); some tracks solo; in concert
1982	Thelonica	Enja	1983	Trio, with George Mraz (bass), Art Taylor (drums)
1983	I'm All Smiles	MPS	1984	Duo, with Hank Jones (piano); in concert
1983	The Master Trio	Baybridge	1983	Trio, with Ron Carter (bass), Tony Williams (drums)
1983	Blues in the Closet	Baybridge	1984	Trio, with Ron Carter (bass), Tony Williams (drums)
1984	Made in Dublin	Livia	2026	Trio with Lindsey Horner (bass), John Wadham (drums)
1986	Nights at the Vanguard	Uptown	1987	Trio, with George Mraz (bass), Al Foster (drums); in concert
1989	Jazz Poet	Timeless	1989	Trio, with George Mraz (bass), Kenny Washington (drums)
1990	Beyond the Blue Bird	Timeless	1991	Quartet, with Kenny Burrell (guitar), George Mraz (bass), Lewis Nash (drums)
1993	Flanagan's Shenanigans	Storyville	1995	Nonet, with Jesper Thilo (tenor sax), Steen Hansen (horn), Vincent Nilsson (baritone horn), Jan Zum Vohrde (alto sax, bass clarinet), Uffe Markussen (tenor sax, soprano sax, bass clarinet), Flemming Madsen (bass clarinet), Jesper Lundgaard (bass), Lewis Nash (drums); in concert
1993	Let's Play the Music of Thad Jones	Enja	1993	Trio, with Jesper Lundgaard (bass), Lewis Nash (drums)
1993	Lady Be Good ... For Ella	Groovin' High	1994	Trio, with Peter Washington (bass), Lewis Nash (drums)
1996	Sea Changes	Alfa Jazz	1996	Trio, with Peter Washington (bass), Lewis Nash (drums)
1997	Sunset and the Mockingbird	Blue Note	1998	Trio, with Peter Washington (bass), Lewis Nash (drums); in concert

=== As sideman ===
Year recorded	Leader	Title	Label	Personnel/ Notes
1990	100 Gold Fingers	Piano Playhouse '90	Absord	
1993	100 Gold Fingers	Piano Playhouse '93, Vol. 1	Absord	
1993	100 Gold Fingers	Piano Playhouse '93, Vol. 2	Absord	
1960	Pepper Adams	Motor City Scene	Bethlehem	and Donald Byrd
1968	Pepper Adams	Encounter!	Prestige	
1980	Pepper Adams	The Master...	Muse	
1985	Pepper Adams	The Adams Effect	Uptown	
1984	Yasuko Agawa	All Right with Me	Invitation	
1986	Lorez Alexandria	My One and Only Love	CBS/Sony	
1998	Harry Allen	Day Dream	BMG	
1985	Franco Ambrosetti	Tentets	Enja	
1960	Gene Ammons	Boss Tenor	Prestige	
1960	Benny Bailey	Big Brass	Candid	
1961	Dave Bailey	Bash!	Jazzline	Reissued as Kenny Dorham Osmosis (Black Lion, 1990) and Tommy Flanagan Trio And Sextet (Onyx/Xanadu, 1973)
1994	Marcus Belgrave	Marcus Belgrave with Detroit's Jazz Piano Legacy, Vol. 1	Detroit Jazz Musicians Co-Op	
1965	Tony Bennett	The Movie Song Album	Columbia	
1960	Art Blakey, Elvin Jones, Philly Joe Jones, Charlie Persip	Gretsch Drum Night at Birdland	Roulette	
1960	Art Blakey, Elvin Jones, Philly Joe Jones, Charlie Persip	Gretsch Drum Night at Birdland, Vol. 2	Roulette	
1965	Pat Bowie	Feelin' Good!	Prestige	
1987	Joshua Breakstone	Evening Star	Contemporary	
1962	Ray Brown	Ray Brown with the All Star Big Band	Verve	
1956	Kenny Burrell	Jazzmen Detroit	Savoy	
1956	Kenny Burrell	Introducing Kenny Burrell	Blue Note	
1956	Kenny Burrell	Swingin'	Blue Note	
1956	Kenny Burrell	Kenny Burrell	Blue Note	This album (BLP 1543) is also known as Volume 2
1957	Kenny Burrell	All Day Long	Prestige	Credited to "The Prestige All Stars"
1957	Kenny Burrell	Kenny Burrell	Prestige	(PRLP 7088)
1958	Kenny Burrell, John Coltrane	Kenny Burrell & John Coltrane	New Jazz	
1960–61	Kenny Burrell	Weaver of Dreams	Columbia	
1962	Kenny Burrell	Bluesy Burrell	Moodsville	Also features Coleman Hawkins
1962	Gary Burton	Who Is Gary Burton?	RCA	
1957	Donald Byrd	Jazz Lab	Columbia	Also features Gigi Gryce
1976	Benny Carter	The King	Pablo	
1976	Benny Carter, Dizzy Gillespie	Carter, Gillespie Inc.	Pablo	
1999	Tommy Cecil	Samba for Felix	Slider	
1957	Paul Chambers	Paul Chambers Quintet	Blue Note	
1956	Kenny Clarke	Kenny Clarke Meets the Detroit Jazzmen	Savoy	
1975	Buck Clayton	A Buck Clayton Jam Session, Vol. 2	Chiaroscuro	
1960	Arnett Cobb	More Party Time	Prestige	
1960	Arnett Cobb	Movin' Right Along	Prestige	
1991	Steve Coleman	Rhythm in Mind	BMG Novus	
1959	John Coltrane	Giant Steps	Atlantic	
1968	Sonny Criss	Sonny's Dream (Birth of the New Cool)	Prestige	
1976	Eddie "Lockjaw" Davis	Straight Ahead	Pablo	
1956	Miles Davis	Collectors' Items	Prestige	
1994	Klaus Doldinger	Doldinger in New York	Bluemoon	
1959	Kenny Dorham	Quiet Kenny	New Jazz	
1960	Kenny Dorham	The Kenny Dorham Memorial Album	Xanadu	
1964	Kenny Dorham	Trompeta Toccata	Blue Note	
1978	Ted Dunbar	Opening Remarks	Xanadu	
1960	Harry "Sweets" Edison	Patented by Edison	Roulette	
1985	Art Ellefson	Art Ellefson Quartet Featuring Tommy Flanagan	Unisson	
1960	Booker Ervin	The Book Cooks	Bethlehem	
1964	Booker Ervin	The Song Book	Prestige	
1981	Tal Farlow	Chromatic Palette	Concord	
1960	Art Farmer	Art	Argo	
1962	Art Farmer	Listen to Art Farmer and the Orchestra	Mercury	
1964	Art Farmer	The Many Faces of Art Farmer	Scepter	
1965–66	Art Farmer	Group Therapy	Scepter	Issued as by "The New York Jazz Sextet", with Tom McIntosh, James Moody and Albert Heath
1964	Ella Fitzgerald	Ella at Juan-Les-Pins	Verve	With Roy Eldridge
1965	Ella Fitzgerald	Ella in Hamburg	Verve	
1969	Ella Fitzgerald	Sunshine of Your Love	Verve	
1969	Ella Fitzgerald	Ella Fitzgerald: Live at Montreux 1969 [DVD]	Eagle Vision	
1970	Ella Fitzgerald	Ella in Budapest	Pablo	
1970	Ella Fitzgerald	Things Ain't What They Used to Be	Reprise	
1971	Ella Fitzgerald	Ella à Nice	Pablo	
1972	Ella Fitzgerald	Jazz at Santa Monica Civic '72	Pablo	
1972	Ella Fitzgerald	Ella Loves Cole	Pablo	
1973	Ella Fitzgerald	Newport Jazz Festival: Live at Carnegie Hall	Pablo	
1974	Ella Fitzgerald	Ella in London	Pablo	
1974	Ella Fitzgerald	Fine and Mellow	Pablo	
1975	Ella Fitzgerald	Montreux '75	Pablo	
1977	Ella Fitzgerald	Montreux '77	Pablo	
1957	Curtis Fuller	Jazz ...It's Magic!	Regent	
1959	Curtis Fuller	Sliding Easy	United Artists	
1959	Curtis Fuller	Blues-ette	Savoy	
1961	Curtis Fuller	South American Cookin'	Epic	
1993	Curtis Fuller	Blues-ette Part II	Savoy	
1975	Dizzy Gillespie	The Dizzy Gillespie Big 7	Pablo	
1993	Dusko Goykovich	Soul Connection	Enja	
1993	Dusko Goykovich	Soul Connection, Volume II	Enja	
1959	Benny Golson	Gettin' with It	New Jazz	
1962	Benny Golson	Free	Argo	
1970	Dexter Gordon	The Panther!	Prestige	
1958	Bennie Green	The Swingin'est	Vee-Jay	
1975	Al Grey	Grey's Mood	Black and Blue	
1976	Jim Hall	Commitment	A&M/Horizon	
1961	Jimmy Hamilton	It's About Time	Swingville	
1961	Jimmy Hamilton	Can't Help Swinging	Swingville	
1979	Scott Hamilton	The Grand Appearance	Progressive	
1996	Scott Hamilton	After Hours	Concord	
1960	Lionel Hampton	Silver Vibes	Columbia	
1962	Slide Hampton	Drum Suite	Epic	
1958	Wilbur Harden	Mainstream 1958	Savoy	And John Coltrane
1958	Wilbur Harden	Jazz Way Out	Savoy	And John Coltrane
1958	Wilbur Harden	Tanganyika Strut	Savoy	And John Coltrane
1958	Wilbur Harden	The King and I	Savoy	
1960	Coleman Hawkins	Coleman Hawkins All Stars	Storyville	
1960	Coleman Hawkins	At Ease with Coleman Hawkins	Moodsville	
1960	Coleman Hawkins	Night Hawk	Swingville	
1962	Coleman Hawkins	Good Old Broadway	Moodsville	
1962	Coleman Hawkins	The Jazz Version of No Strings	Moodsville	
1962	Coleman Hawkins, Roy Eldridge, Johnny Hodges	Hawkins! Eldridge! Hodges! Alive! At the Village Gate!	Verve	
1962	Coleman Hawkins	Hawkins! Alive! At the Village Gate	Verve	
1962	Coleman Hawkins	Coleman Hawkins Plays Make Someone Happy from Do Re Mi	Moodsville	
1962	Coleman Hawkins	Desafinado	Impulse!	
1962	Coleman Hawkins	Today and Now	Impulse!	
1962	Coleman Hawkins	Back in Bean's Bag	Columbia	
1962	Roy Haynes	Out of the Afternoon	Impulse!	Also features Roland Kirk
1976	Roy Haynes	Sugar Roy	Kitty	
1960	Jimmy Heath	Really Big!	Riverside	
1985	Jimmy Heath	New Picture	Landmark	
1960	Bill Henderson	Please Send Me Someone to Love	Vee-Jay	
1997	Joe Henderson	Porgy & Bess	Verve	
1989	Jon Hendricks	Freddie Freeloader	Denon	
1997	Fred Hersch	The Duo Album	Classical Action	
1962	Freddie Hubbard	The Artistry of Freddie Hubbard	Impulse!	With Curtis Fuller and John Gilmore
1991	Bobby Hutcherson	Mirage	Landmark	
1957	Milt Jackson	Bags & Flutes	Atlantic	
1958	Milt Jackson	Bean Bags	Atlantic	With Coleman Hawkins
1958	Milt Jackson	Bags' Opus	United Artists	With Art Farmer and Benny Golson
1960–61	Milt Jackson	Vibrations	Atlantic	With Kenny Burrell and Jimmy Heath
1962	Milt Jackson	Invitation	Riverside	With Kenny Dorham and Jimmy Heath
1962	Milt Jackson	Statements	Impulse!	With Jimmy Heath
1964	Milt Jackson	Jazz 'n' Samba	Impulse!	With Jimmy Heath
1976	Milt Jackson	Feelings	Pablo	
1962	Willis Jackson	Bossa Nova Plus	Prestige	
1964	Illinois Jacquet	Desert Winds	Argo	
1956	Bobby Jaspar	Clarinescapade	Columbia	
1960	Jazz Artists Guild	Newport Rebels	Candid	With Charles Mingus, Roy Eldridge, and others
1975	Jazz at the Philharmonic	At the Montreux Jazz Festival 1975	Pablo	
1957	John Jenkins	Jazz Eyes	Regent	Collaborative album, also features Donald Byrd, 1978 reissue as Byrd's Star Eyes (Savoy)
1960	Budd Johnson	Budd Johnson and the Four Brass Giants	Riverside	
1960	Budd Johnson	Let's Swing!	Swingville	
1957	J. J. Johnson	J Is for Jazz	Columbia	
1957	J. J. Johnson	Blue Trombone	Columbia	With Max Roach or Elvin Jones
1957	J. J. Johnson	First Place	Columbia	With Max Roach
1957	J. J. Johnson	Dial J. J. 5	Columbia	With Elvin Jones
1958	J. J. Johnson	J. J. in Person!	Columbia	
1979	J. J. Johnson	Pinnacles	Milestone	
1980	Elvin Jones	Heart to Heart	Denon	
1960	Jo Jones	Vamp 'til Ready	Everest	
1976	Jo Jones	The Main Man	Pablo	
1958	Philly Joe Jones	Blues for Dracula	Riverside	
1981	Rodney Jones	My Funny Valentine	Timeless	
1956	Thad Jones	Detroit – New York Junction	Blue Note	
1957	Thad Jones	Mad Thad	Period	
1957	Thad Jones	The Magnificent Thad Jones, Vol. 3	Blue Note	
1959	Thad Jones	Motor City Scene	United Artists	
1961	Clifford Jordan	A Story Tale	Jazzland	
1978	Clifford Jordan	The Adventurer	Muse	
1962	Michel Legrand	Michel Legrand Plays Richard Rodgers	Philips	
1962	Bill Leslie	Diggin' the Chicks	Argo	
1958	Booker Little	Booker Little 4 and Max Roach/The Defiant Ones	United Artists	Flanagan (and Roach) present for the first six tracks only
1960	Booker Little	Booker Little	Time	Flanagan present on half of the album only
1985	The Manhattan Transfer	Vocalese	Atlantic	
1957	Herbie Mann	Flute Flight	Prestige	
1957	Herbie Mann	Flute Soufflé	Prestige	
1960	Howard McGhee	Dusty Blue	Bethlehem	
1997–98	Marian McPartland	Just Friends	Concord	
1962	Charles Mills	Tracks in the Sand	Access	Original motion picture soundtrack, with Yusef Lateef and Max Roach
1960	Charles Mingus	Reincarnation of a Lovebird	Candid	
1959	Frank Minion	The Soft Land of Make Believe	Bethlehem	
1980	Billy Mitchell	De Lawd's Blues	Xanadu	
1960–61	Blue Mitchell	Smooth as the Wind	Riverside	
1959	J. R. Monterose	Straight Ahead	Xanadu	
1960	Wes Montgomery	The Incredible Jazz Guitar of Wes Montgomery	Riverside	
1960–61	James Moody	Moody with Strings	Argo	
1992	Frank Morgan	You Must Believe in Spring	Antilles	Two tracks: one solo and one duet
1962	Gerry Mulligan	Jeru	Columbia	
1960	Joe Newman	Jive at Five	Swingville	
1961	Joe Newman	Good 'n' Groovy	Swingville	
1961	Joe Newman	Joe's Hap'nin's	Swingville	
1959	Mary Osborne	A Girl and Her Guitar	Warwick	
1982	Kim Parker	Good Girl	Soul Note	
1979	Art Pepper	Straight Life	Galaxy	
1956	Oscar Pettiford	The Oscar Pettiford Orchestra in Hi-Fi	ABC	
1962	Dave Pike	Limbo Carnival	New Jazz	
1962	Dave Pike	Dave Pike Plays the Jazz Version of Oliver!	Moodsville	
1962	Pony Poindexter	Pony's Express	Epic	with Eric Dolphy, Dexter Gordon, Jimmy Heath, Clifford Jordan and Phil Woods
1960	Julian Priester	Keep Swingin'	Riverside	with Jimmy Heath and Elvin Jones
1985	Jimmy Raney	Wisteria	Criss Cross	
1980	Lou Rawls	Shades of Blue	Philadelphia International	
1996	Chuck Redd	Stomp, Look and Listen	Exclusive Arts	
1977	Waymon Reed	46th and 8th	Artists House	
1994	The Riverside Reunion Band	Hi-Fly	Milestone	
1957	Red Rodney	Red Rodney 1957	Signal	
1956	Sonny Rollins	Saxophone Colossus	Prestige	With Max Roach
1965	Sonny Rollins	There Will Never Be Another You	Impulse!	
1989	Sonny Rollins	Falling in Love with Jazz	Milestone	
1993	Sonny Rollins	Old Flames	Milestone	
1995	Sonny Rollins	Sonny Rollins + 3	Milestone	
1995	Annie Ross	Music Is Forever	DRG	
1960	Pee Wee Russell	Swingin' with Pee Wee	Prestige	With Buck Clayton
1957	A. K. Salim	Stable Mates	Savoy	Album split with Yusef Lateef
1980	Nisse Sandstrom	Home Cooking	Phontastic	
1997	Daryl Sherman	A Lady Must Live	After 9	
1982	Charlie Shoemake	Cross Roads	Discovery	
1987	Carol Sloane	But Not for Me	CBS/Sony	
1958	Louis Smith	Here Comes Louis Smith	Blue Note	With "Buckshot La Funke" (Cannonball Adderley)
1991	Gary Smulyan	Homage	Criss Cross	
1960	Les Spann	Gemini	Jazzland	
1957	Idrees Sulieman	Roots	Prestige	Billed as by "The Prestige All Stars"
1960	Buddy Tate with Clark Terry	Tate-a-Tate	Swingville	
1960	Clark Terry	Color Changes	Candid	with Yusef Lateef
1999	Clark Terry	One on One	Chesky	
1982	A Dream Comes True	Lilian Terry	Soul Note	
1965	Lucky Thompson	Lucky Thompson Plays Happy Days Are Here Again	Prestige	
1978	Hidefumi Toki	City - Hidefumi Toki and the Super Jazz Trio	Baystate	
1960	Stanley Turrentine	Stan "The Man" Turrentine	Time	
1961	Stanley Turrentine	ZT's Blues	Blue Note	
1956	(Various)	After Hours Jazz	Epic	
1977	(Various)	I Remember Bebop	Columbia	
1977	(Various)	They All Played Bebop	Columbia	
1982	(Various)	AJF '82 All Star Jam	Eastworld	
1982	(Various)	Live Special	Eastworld	
2001	(Various)	A Great Night in Harlem	Playboy/Concord	His final recording, September 24, 2001, a trio performance of "Sunset and The Mockingbird", with Albert "Tootie" Heath and Peter Washington
2001	Marlene VerPlanck (and Billy VerPlanck)	Speaking of Love	Audiophile	
1980	Bennie Wallace	The Free Will	Enja	
1998	Bennie Wallace	Bennie Wallace	AudioQuest	
1988	Grover Washington, Jr.	Then and Now	Columbia	
1960	Frank Wess	The Frank Wess Quartet	Prestige	
1962	Frank Wess	Southern Comfort	Prestige	
1981	Frank Wess	Flute Juice	Progressive	
1995	Wesla Whitfield	7th Ave. Stroll	Verve	
2000–01	Wesla Whitfield	September Songs	HighNote	
1968	Gerald Wilson	California Soul	World Pacific	
1959	Lem Winchester	Winchester Special	New Jazz	
1956	Phil Woods	Pairing Off	Prestige	
1961	Phil Woods	Rights of Swing	Candid	
1981	Phil Woods	Three for All	Enja	
1988	Phil Woods	Here's to My Lady	Chesky	
1960	Nat Wright	The Biggest Voice in Jazz	Warwick	
1996	Miki Yamaoka	I Remember Clifford	Denon	
1995	Dave Young	Two by Two – Piano–Bass Duets, Volume 1	Justin Time	
1995	Dave Young	Side by Side – Piano–Bass Duets, Volume 3	Justin Time	
1999	Attila Zoller	The Last Recordings	Enja	

Main sources:
