= Eclypso =

Eclypso may refer to:

- Eclypso (album), by Tommy Flanagan, 1979
- Hernan Arber, a member of the psytrance duo Mindelight
