= Eddie Locke =

American jazz musician (1930–2009)

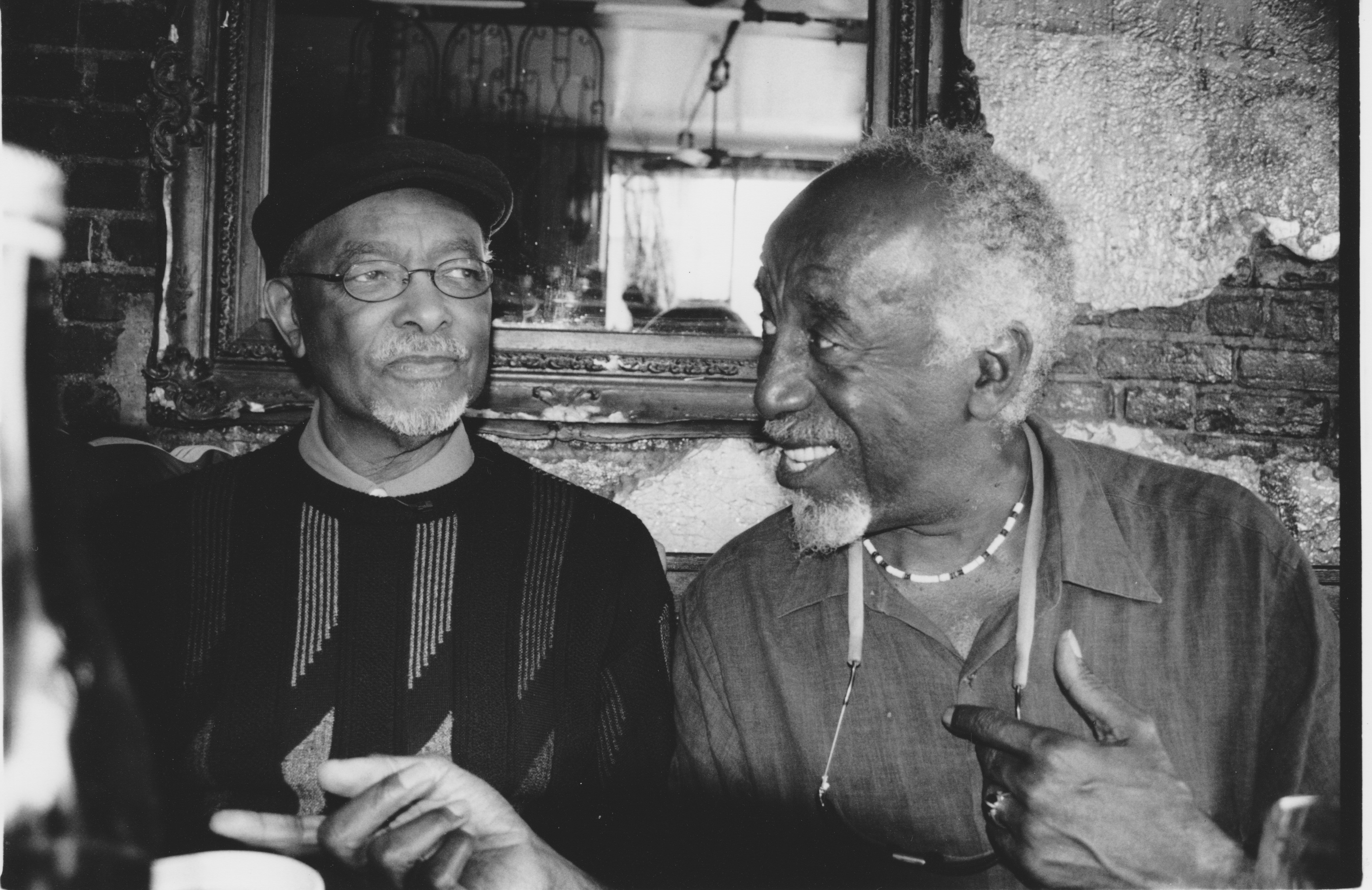
Photo taken during the making of documentary film on Cleven Goodie Goudeau by Director/Film maker T.J. Walkup

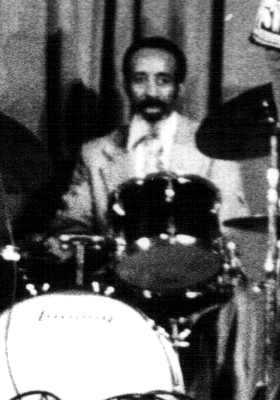
Eddie Locke in 1977

Eddie Locke (August 2, 1930 – September 7, 2009) was an American jazz drummer.

Eddie Locke was a part of the fertile and vibrant Detroit jazz scene during the 1940s and 1950s, which brought forth many great musicians including the Jones brothers (Hank, Thad, and Elvin), Kenny Burrell, Lucky Thompson, Tommy Flanagan, Barry Harris, and so many others. He eventually formed a variety act with drummer Oliver Jackson called Bop & Locke which played the Apollo Theater. He moved to New York City in 1954, and worked there with Dick Wellstood, Tony Parenti, Red Allen, Willie "The Lion" Smith, and Teddy Wilson amongst others. During this time he came under the tutelage of the great Jo Jones, and eventually became known as a driving and swinging drummer who kept solid time and supported the soloist.

During the late 1950s he formed two of his most fruitful musical relationships, one with Roy Eldridge, and the other with Coleman Hawkins. His recording debut came with Eldridge in 1959 on "On The Town". He later became a member of the Coleman Hawkins Quartet in the 1960s, along with pianist Tommy Flanagan and bassist Major Holley. In a later interview, Locke recalled that, with the exception of Wrapped Tight and Desafinado, all the group's albums were played on the spot, without prior rehearsal or arrangements. Of those records, he named Today and Now as his favorite.

Throughout the 1970s, he played with Roy Eldridge at Jimmy Ryan's in Manhattan, and wound out his career freelancing, as well as teaching youngsters at the Trevor Day School on Manhattan's upper west side.

Eddie Locke died on Monday morning, September 7, 2009, in Ramsey, New Jersey.

Locke appears in the photograph A Great Day in Harlem- first row standing, third from the left. (not including the leg sticking into the frame)

== Discography ==
=== As leader ===
- 1977: Jivin' With the Refugees from Hastings Street (Chiaroscuro Records) with Tommy Flanagan, Major Holley, Oliver Jackson
- 1978: Eddie Locke and Friends (Storyville Records)

=== As sideman ===
With Ray Bryant

- Little Susie (Columbia, 1960)

With Kenny Burrell

- Bluesy Burrell (Moodsville, 1962) – with Coleman Hawkins

With Roy Eldridge

- Swingin' on the Town (Verve, 1960)
- Happy Time (Pablo, 1975)
- What It's All About (Pablo, 1976)

With Sir Roland Hanna

- Dream (Venus 2001)

With Coleman Hawkins

- Good Old Broadway (Moodsville, 1962)
- The Jazz Version of No Strings (Moodsville, 1962)
- Hawkins! Eldridge! Hodges! Alive! At the Village Gate! (Verve, 1962) with Roy Eldridge and Johnny Hodges
- Hawkins! Alive! At the Village Gate (Verve, 1962)
- Coleman Hawkins Plays Make Someone Happy from Do Re Mi (Moodsville, 1962)
- Desafinado (Impulse!, 1962)
- Today and Now (Impulse!, 1962)
- Wrapped Tight (Impulse!, 1965)
- Sirius (Pablo, 1966 [1974])

With Lee Konitz

- Chicago 'n All That Jazz (Groove Merchant, 1975)
