= Pete Brown (jazz musician) =

American jazz saxophonist and bandleader (1906–1963)

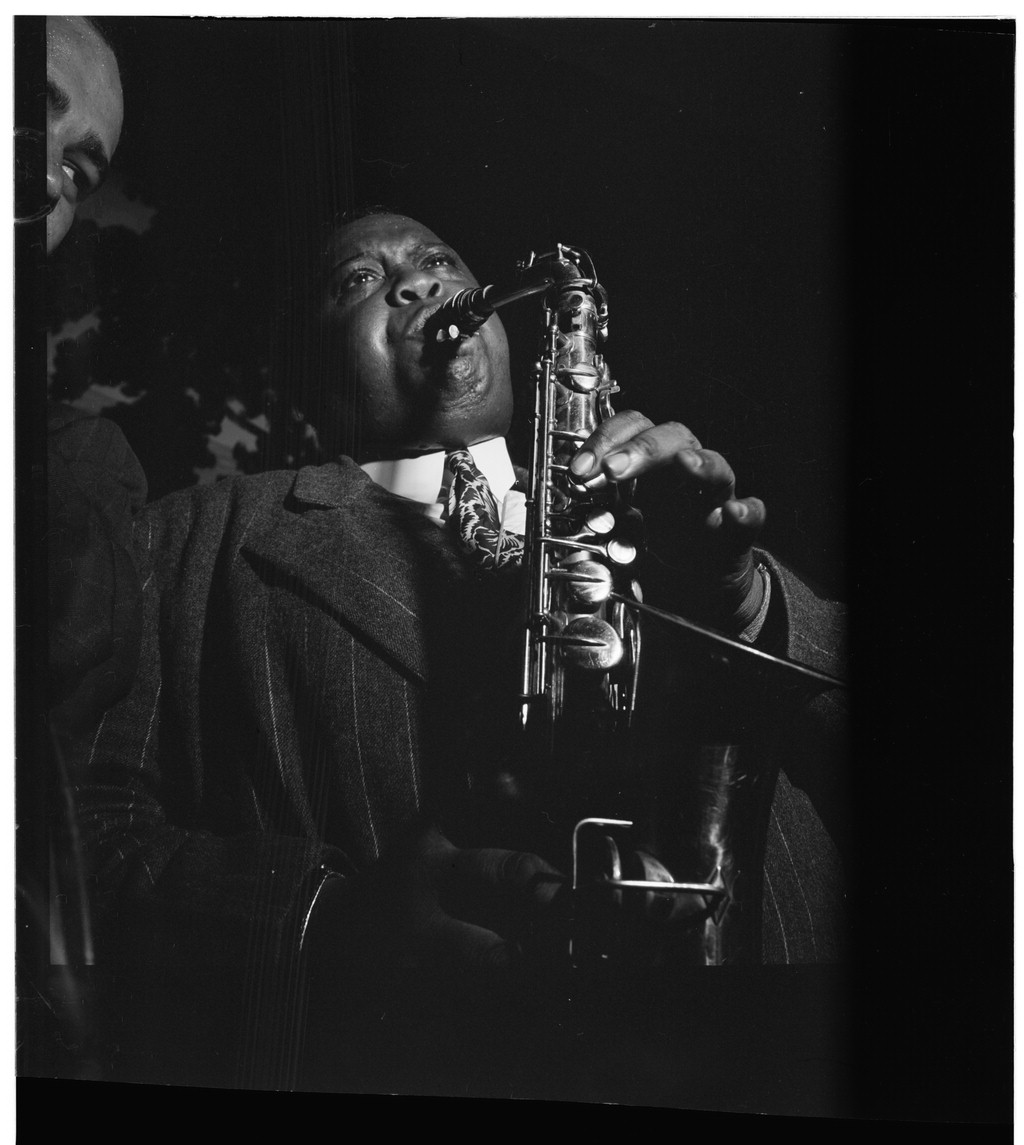
- Pete Brown, between 1938 and 1948

Background information
- Born: James Ostend Brown; November 9, 1906; Baltimore, Maryland, U.S.
- Died: September 20, 1963 (aged 56) New York City, U.S.
- Genre: Jazz
- Occupation: Musician
- Instrument: Saxophone
- Years active: 1910–1966

James Ostend "Pete" Brown (November 9, 1906 – September 20, 1963) was an American jazz alto saxophonist and bandleader.

== Career ==
Brown learned to play piano, trumpet, and saxophone while young. He played in New York City with Bernie Robinson's orchestra in 1928, and played from 1928 to 1934 with Charlie Skeete.

In 1937, he worked in the band of John Kirby; for several years in the 1930s he worked with Frankie Newton, who was also a member of Kirby's band. Brown and Newton recorded often. In addition to recording under his own name, Brown also recorded with Willie "The Lion" Smith, Jimmie Noone, Buster Bailey, Leonard Feather, Joe Marsala, and Maxine Sullivan in the 1930s.

He worked on 52nd Street in New York in the 1940s, both as a sideman (with Slim Gaillard, among others). As a bandleader, he was in Allen Eager's 52nd Street All-Stars in 1946.

In the 1950s, Brown's health began to fail, and he receded from full-time performance. He played with Joe Wilder (1954), Big Joe Turner (1956), Sammy Price, and Champion Jack Dupree, and appeared at the 1957 Newport Jazz Festival with Coleman Hawkins and Roy Eldridge. His last live appearance was in 1960 with Dizzy Gillespie. His final recording session took place on October 21st, 1961 in New York City with the Bernard Addison All-Stars. That session was released on Addison's album High in a Basement on the British 77 Records label.

Brown was the teacher of Cecil Payne and Flip Phillips.

== Discography ==
=== As leader ===
- Peter the Great (Bethlehem, 1955)
- Jazz Kaleidoscope (Bethlehem, 1957)
- From the Heart (Verve, 1960)

=== As sideman ===
- Bernard Addison, High in a Basement (77 Records, 1961)
- Champion Jack Dupree, Blues from the Gutter (Atlantic, 1958)
- Coleman Hawkins, The Coleman Hawkins, Roy Eldridge, Pete Brown, Jo Jones All Stars at Newport (Verve, 1957)
- Jonah Jones, Trumpet On Tour (Barone, 1962)
- Big Joe Turner, Big Joe Rides Again (Atlantic, 1960)
