= Grassella Oliphant =

American jazz musician

Grassella Oliphant (September 1, 1929, in Pittsburgh – December 16, 2017) was an American jazz drummer.

Oliphant backed Ahmad Jamal in 1952 and Sarah Vaughan in the late 1950s, then worked with Gloria Lynne and Shirley Scott.

He released two soul jazz albums as a leader on Atlantic Records in the 1960s. On The Grass Roots, released in 1965, he worked with the saxophonist Harold Ousley, the vibraphonist Bobby Hutcherson and the bassist Ray McKinney. His 1968 release, The Grass Is Greener, had John Patton on organ, Grant Green on guitar, Clark Terry on trumpet and Major Holley on bass, in addition to Ousley. The Grass Is Greener has been sampled by hip hop artists. Both albums were reissued on CD by Collectables Records as a single disc in 2005.

After an almost 40-years break from music, working as the manager of a golf course, Oliphant resumed playing in the 2000s, this time in the New Jersey area. During his 2007 NAMM Oral History Program interview, Oliphant spoke about his early days in jazz and the many changes he has witnessed during his career, especially those related to the development of instruments and musical products.

== Discography ==
As leader

- The Grass Roots (Atlantic Records, 1965) (with Harold Ousley, Bobby Hutcherson. and Ray McKinney)
- The Grass Is Greener (Atlantic Records, 1968) (with Clark Terry, Harold Ousley, Big John Patton, Grant Green, and Major Holley)

With Tony Scott

- South Pacific Jazz (ABC Records), 1958)

With Gloria Lynne

- I'm Glad There Is You (Everest Records), 1960)

With Herman Foster

- The Explosive Piano of Herman Foster (Epic Records, 1961)

With Joe Kennedy Jr.

- Accentuate the Positive (Consolidated Artists, 1962)

With Shirley Scott

- The Soul Is Willing (Prestige Records, 1963)
- Soul Shoutin' (Prestige Records, 1963)
