= Blues in the Closet =

Blues in the Closet may refer to:

- "Blues in the Closet", a composition, also known as "Collard Greens and Black Eyed Peas", by Harry Babasin and Oscar Pettiford
- Blues in the Closet (Bud Powell album), 1956
- Blues in the Closet (Tommy Flanagan album), 1983
