= For Members Only =

Studio album by Shirley Scott
- Released: January 9, 1964
- Recorded: August 22 & 24, 1963; New York City
- Genre: Jazz
- Length: 38:13
- Label: Impulse! A-51
- Producer: Bob Thiele

Shirley Scott chronology
| Drag 'em Out (1963) | For Members Only (1964) | Soul Shoutin' (1964) |

For Members Only is an album by American jazz organist Shirley Scott. It was released on January 9, 1964, through Impulse! Records. The recording was made in August 1963.

== Reception ==
The Allmusic review awarded the album 4½ stars.

Professional ratings
Review scores
| Source | Rating |
|---|---|
| Allmusic | 4.5/5 stars |

== Track listing ==
All compositions by Shirley Scott except as indicated

1. "Southern Comfort" (Oliver Nelson) — 5:40
2. "Blue Piano" (Ellington) — 3:45
3. "Freedom Dance" (Nelson) — 4:53
4. "Toys in the Attic" (Duning) — 2:51
5. "Blues for Members" — 5:50
6. "I've Grown Accustomed to Her Face" (Lerner, Loewe) — 4:45
7. "Marchin' to Riverside" — 3:15
8. "We're Goin' Home" — 7:14

Recorded on August 22 (tracks 5–8) and August 24 (tracks 1–4), 1963.

== Personnel ==
- Shirley Scott — organ
- Thad Jones, Jerry Kail, Tom McIntosh, Jimmy Nottingham, Ernie Royal — trumpet (tracks 1–4)
- Jimmy Cleveland, Quentin Jackson, Thomas Mitchell — trombone (tracks 1–4)
- Eddy Manson — harmonica (tracks 1–4)
- Mundell Lowe — guitar (tracks 1–4)
- Art Davis (tracks 1–4), Earl May (tracks 5–8) — bass
- Jimmy Cobb (tracks 5–8), Ed Shaughnessy (tracks 1–4) — drums
- Joe Venuto — percussion (tracks 1–4)
- Oliver Nelson — arranger, conductor (tracks 1–4)
