= Drag 'em Out =

Studio album by Shirley Scott
- Released: 1963
- Recorded: May 27, 1963
- Studio: Van Gelder Studio, Englewood Cliffs, NJ
- Genre: Jazz
- Length: 30:43
- Label: Prestige; PRLP 7305
- Producer: Ozzie Cadena

Shirley Scott chronology
The Soul Is Willing (1963)	Drag 'em Out (1963)	For Members Only (1964)

Professional ratings
Review scores
Source	Rating
Allmusic	3/5 stars

Drag 'em Out is an album by organist Shirley Scott recorded in 1963 and released on the Prestige label.

== Reception ==
The Allmusic site awarded the album 3 stars.

== Track listing ==
1. "Drag 'em Out" (Shirley Scott) – 15:46
2. "The Second Time Around" (Sammy Cahn, Jimmy Van Heusen) – 4:41
3. "Out of It" (Scott) – 3:39
4. "The Song Is Ended" (Irving Berlin) – 6:36

== Personnel ==
- Shirley Scott - organ
- Major Holley - bass
- Roy Brooks - drums
