= The Soul Is Willing =

Studio album by Shirley Scott
- Released: Mid August 1963
- Recorded: January 10, 1963
- Studio: Van Gelder Studio, Englewood Cliffs, NJ
- Genre: Jazz, Blues
- Length: 37:54
- Label: Prestige; PRLP 7267
- Producer: Ozzie Cadena

Shirley Scott chronology
Happy Talk (1962)	The Soul Is Willing (1963)	Drag 'em Out (1963)

Professional ratings
Review scores
Source	Rating
Allmusic	4/5 stars

The Soul Is Willing is a studio album by organist Shirley Scott recorded and released in 1963 for Prestige as PRLP 7267. It features famous saxophonist Stanley Turrentine. In 1995, the album was reissued along with Soul Shoutin' on the same CD, featuring a different track order.

== Reception ==
The Allmusic review stated "This is a good album that shows the husband and wife team of Shirley Scott and Stanley Turrentine in their usual, excellent form -- a fine example of organ combo soul jazz".

== Track listing ==
1. "I Feel All Right" (Stanley Turrentine) - 6:20
2. "Secret Love" (Sammy Fain, Paul Francis Webster) - 8:23
3. "Remember" (Irving Berlin) - 4:12
4. "Stolen Sweets" (Wild Bill Davis, Dickie Thompson) - 6:26
5. "The Soul Is Willing" (Turrentine) - 6:32
6. "Yes Indeed" (Sy Oliver) - 6:01

== Personnel ==
- Shirley Scott - organ
- Stanley Turrentine - tenor saxophone
- Major Holley - bass
- Grassella Oliphant - drums
