= The Hawk Flies High =

Studio album by Coleman Hawkins
- Released: July 1957
- Recorded: March 12 and 15, 1957
- Studios: Reeves Sound Studios, New York City
- Genre: Jazz
- Length: 39:02
- Labels: Riverside; RLP 12-233
- Producers: Orrin Keepnews and Bill Grauer

Coleman Hawkins chronology
The Gilded Hawk (1956-57)	The Hawk Flies High (1957)	The Coleman Hawkins, Roy Eldridge, Pete Brown, Jo Jones All Stars at Newport (1957)

Professional ratings
Review scores
Source	Rating
AllMusic	4.5/5 stars
Disc	4/5 stars
The Rolling Stone Jazz Record Guide	3/5 stars
The Penguin Guide to Jazz Recordings	4/4 stars

The Hawk Flies High is a 1957 album by jazz tenor saxophonist Coleman Hawkins. Apart from Barry Galbraith and Jo Jones on guitar and drums, the line-up of his accompanying sextet had a bebop background, namely J.J. Johnson on trombone, Idrees Sulieman on trumpet, pianist Hank Jones, and Oscar Pettiford on bass.

== Track listing ==
1. "Chant" (Hank Jones) – 5:08
2. "Juicy Fruit" (Idrees Sulieman) – 11:16
3. "Think Deep" (William O. Smith) – 3:24
4. "Laura" (David Raksin, Johnny Mercer) – 4:34
5. "Blue Lights" (Gigi Gryce) – 5:44
6. "Sancticity" (Hawkins) – 9:10

== Personnel ==
- Coleman Hawkins – tenor saxophone
- Hank Jones – piano
- Oscar Pettiford – bass
- Jo Jones – drums
- Barry Galbraith – guitar
- J.J. Johnson – trombone
- Idrees Sulieman – trumpet
