= The Gilded Hawk =

Studio album by Coleman Hawkins
- Released: 1957
- Recorded: October 17, 1956 and February 7–8, 1957
- Studio: NYC
- Genre: Jazz
- Length: 35:00
- Label: Capitol; T 819

Coleman Hawkins chronology
The Hawk in Paris (1956)	The Gilded Hawk (1957)	The Hawk Flies High (1957)

The Gilded Hawk is an album by saxophonist Coleman Hawkins with an orchestra arranged and conducted by Glenn Osser which was recorded in late 1956 and early 1957 and released on the Capitol label.

== Reception ==
Professional ratings
Review scores
Source	Rating
AllMusic	2/5 stars

Scott Yanow of AllMusic states, "this LP finds the great tenor being weighed down by Glenn Osser's muzaky arrangements for the strings. Since Hawkins does little other than caress the melodies, nothing significant happens, making this one of the most dispensable Coleman Hawkins ever".

== Track listing ==
1. "Out of the Night" (Harry Sosnik, Walter Hirsch) – 2:53
2. "Autumn Leaves" (Joseph Kosma, Jacques Prévert, Johnny Mercer) – 2:43
3. "Stranger in Paradise" (Robert Wright, George Forrest) – 2:25
4. "My Mother's Eyes" (Abel Baer, L. Wolfe Gilbert) – 3:50
5. "Everything Happens to Me" (Matt Dennis, Tom Adair) – 2:53
6. "It Had to Be You" (Isham Jones, Gus Kahn) – 2:43
7. "With Every Breath I Take" (Ralph Rainger, Leo Robin) – 3:14
8. "I'm Yours" (Johnny Green, Yip Harburg) – 2:53
9. "I Didn't Know What Time It Was" (Richard Rodgers, Lorenz Hart) – 2:51
10. "Baubles, Bangles & Beads" (Wright, Forrest) – 2:55
11. "Boulevard of Broken Dreams" (Harry Warren, Al Dubin) – 2:31
12. "A Cottage for Sale" (Willard Robison, Larry Conley) – 3:09

== Personnel ==
- Coleman Hawkins – tenor saxophone
- Unidentified orchestra arranged and conducted by Glenn Osser
