= A Night at the Vanguard =

Live album by Kenny Burrell
- Released: 1959
- Recorded: September 16, 1959; Village Vanguard, New York City
- Genre: Jazz
- Label: Argo; LP 655
- Producer: Jack Tracy

Kenny Burrell chronology
On View at the Five Spot Cafe (1959)	A Night at the Vanguard (1959)	Weaver of Dreams (1961)

A Night at the Vanguard (also released as Man at Work) is a live album by guitarist Kenny Burrell recorded in 1959 at the Village Vanguard and originally released on the Argo label.

== Reception ==
Professional ratings
Review scores
Source	Rating
Allmusic	4.5/5 stars

Allmusic awarded the album 4½ stars and reviewer Michael Erlewine described it as: "A solid effort top to bottom, and a recording most highly recommended, this is Burrell and his extraordinary trio very close to, if not truly in their prime, and their element".

== Track listing ==
A Night at the Vanguard track listing
No.	Title	Writer(s)	Length
1.	"All Night Long"	Kenny Burrell	5:15
2.	"Will You Still Be Mine"	Matt Dennis, Tom Adair	4:24
3.	"I'm a Fool to Want You"	Frank Sinatra, Jack Wolf, Joel Herron	4:40
4.	"Trio"	Erroll Garner	4:20
5.	"Broadway"	Billy Byrd, Teddy McRae, Henri Woode	4:18
6.	"Soft Winds"	Benny Goodman	3:20
7.	"Just A-Sittin' and A-Rockin'"	Duke Ellington, Billy Strayhorn	4:18
8.	"Well You Needn't"	Thelonious Monk	4:29

== Personnel ==
- Kenny Burrell - guitar
- Richard Davis - bass
- Roy Haynes - drums
