= Bluesin' Around =

Studio album by Kenny Burrell
- Released: 1983
- Recorded: November 21 & 29, 1961, March 6, 1962 and April 30, 1962; New York City
- Genre: Jazz
- Length: 37:05
- Label: Columbia; FC 38507
- Producer: John Hammond

Kenny Burrell chronology
| Weaver of Dreams (1961) | Bluesin' Around (1983) | Bluesy Burrell (1963) |

Bluesin' Around is an album by guitarist Kenny Burrell, recorded in 1961 and 1962 and first released on the Columbia label in 1983.

== Reception ==
Professional ratings
Review scores
| Source | Rating |
|---|---|
| AllMusic | 3/5 stars |
| The Rolling Stone Jazz Record Guide | 4/5 stars |

AllMusic awarded the album 3 stars, stating that "the results, even with a few dated numbers such as 'Mambo Twist', are excellent".

== Track listing ==
All compositions by Kenny Burrell except as indicated

1. "Mambo Twist" - 5:06
2. "The Switch" - 3:04
3. "The Squeeze" - 4:17
4. "Bluesin' Around" - 3:42
5. "Bye and Bye" (Traditional) - 2:50
6. "Moten Swing" (Bennie Moten) - 6:20
7. "People Will Say We're in Love" (Oscar Hammerstein II, Richard Rodgers) - 3:41
8. "One Mint Julep" (Rudy Toombs) - 3:25
9. "Mood Indigo" (Barney Bigard, Duke Ellington, Irving Mills) - 4:40
- Recorded in New York City on November 21, 1961 (tracks 1 & 2), November 29, 1961 (tracks 3, 5 & 9), March 6, 1962 (track 4) and April 30, 1962 (tracks 6–8)

== Personnel ==
- Kenny Burrell - guitar
- Eddie Bert - trombone (track 4)
- Illinois Jacquet - tenor saxophone (tracks 1–3, 5 & 9)
- Leo Wright - alto saxophone (tracks 6–8)
- Hank Jones - piano (tracks 1–5 & 9)
- Jack McDuff - organ (tracks 6–8)
- George Duvivier (track 4), Major Holley (tracks 1–3, 5 & 9) - bass
- Osie Johnson (tracks 1 & 2), Louis Hayes (track 4), Jimmy Crawford (tracks 3, 5 & 9), Joe Dukes (tracks 6–8) - drums
