= Duke Ellington Meets Coleman Hawkins =

1963 album by Duke Ellington

Studio album by Duke Ellington and Coleman Hawkins
- Released: January 1963
- Recorded: August 18, 1962
- Studio: Van Gelder Studio, Englewood Cliffs
- Genre: Jazz
- Length: 39:05
- Label: Impulse!
- Producer: Bob Thiele

Duke Ellington chronology
Midnight in Paris (1962)	Duke Ellington Meets Coleman Hawkins (1963)	Studio Sessions, New York 1962 (1962)

Coleman Hawkins chronology
Coleman Hawkins Plays Make Someone Happy from Do Re Mi (1962)	Duke Ellington Meets Coleman Hawkins (1963)	Today and Now (1963)

Professional ratings
Review scores
Source	Rating
AllMusic	5/5 stars
Down Beat	4/5 stars
New Record Mirror	4/5 stars
The Rolling Stone Jazz Record Guide	4/5 stars
The Penguin Guide to Jazz Recordings	3/4 stars

Duke Ellington Meets Coleman Hawkins is a jazz album by Duke Ellington and Coleman Hawkins that was recorded on August 18, 1962, and released in February 1963 by Impulse! Records.

In 1995, The New York Times called it "one of the great Ellington albums, one of the great Hawkins albums and one of the great albums of the 1960s."

== Track listing ==
All tracks composed by Duke Ellington, except where noted.

1. "Limbo Jazz" – 5:14
2. "Mood Indigo" (Duke Ellington, Barney Bigard) – 5:56
3. "Ray Charles' Place" – 4:04
4. "Wanderlust" (Duke Ellington, Johnny Hodges) – 5:00
5. "You Dirty Dog" – 4:19
6. "Self-Portrait (of the Bean)" (Duke Ellington, Billy Strayhorn) – 3:52
7. "The Jeep Is Jumpin'" (Duke Ellington, Johnny Hodges) – 4:49
8. "The Ricitic" – 5:51
9. "Solitude" (Duke Ellington, Eddie DeLange) (1995 CD bonus track) – 5:51

== Personnel ==
- Duke Ellington – piano
- Coleman Hawkins – tenor saxophone
- Johnny Hodges – alto saxophone
- Harry Carney – baritone saxophone, bass clarinet
- Lawrence Brown – trombone
- Ray Nance – cornet, violin
- Aaron Bell – double bass
- Sam Woodyard – drums

Production

- Bob Thiele – producer
- Rudy Van Gelder – engineer
- Joe Alper – photography
- Jason Claiborne – graphic design
- Stanley Dance – liner notes
- Hollis King – art direction

Reissue

- Michael Cuscuna – liner notes, reissue producer
- Erick Labson – digital remastering

== Charts ==
Chart performance for Duke Ellington Meets Coleman Hawkins
Chart (2022)	Peak position
German Albums (Offizielle Top 100)	67
