= Confirmation (Tommy Flanagan album) =

Studio album by Tommy Flanagan
- Released: 1982
- Recorded: February 4, 1977; November 15, 1978
- Studio: Sound Ideas Studios and Penthouse Studio, New York City
- Genre: Jazz
- Length: 35:40
- Label: Enja; 4014
- Producer: Horst Weber and Matthias Winckelmann

Tommy Flanagan chronology
Tommy Flanagan Plays the Music of Harold Arlen (1978)	Confirmation (1982)	Ballads & Blues (1978)

Confirmation is an album by pianist Tommy Flanagan compiling unreleased tracks recorded in 1977 and 1978 at sessions that produced Eclypso and Ballads & Blues which was released on the Enja label in 1982.

== Reception ==
Professional ratings
Review scores
Source	Rating
AllMusic	3/5 stars
The Penguin Guide to Jazz	2.5/4 stars

AllMusic awarded the album 3 stars.

== Track listing ==
1. "Maybe September" (Ray Evans, Percy Faith, Jay Livingston) – 4:54
2. "Confirmation" [alternate take] (Charlie Parker) – 6:48
3. "How High the Moon" (Morgan Lewis, Nancy Hamilton) – 6:00
4. "It Never Entered My Mind" (Richard Rodgers, Lorenz Hart) – 7:05
5. "Cup Bearers" [alternate take] (Tom McIntosh) – 4:05
6. "50-21" (Thad Jones) – 6:48
- Recorded at Sound Ideas Studios, NYC on February 4, 1977 (tracks 1, 2, 5 & 6) and Penthouse Studio, NYC on November 15, 1978 (tracks 3 & 4)

== Personnel ==
- Tommy Flanagan – piano
- George Mraz – bass
- Elvin Jones – drums (tracks 1, 2, 5 & 6)
