= The Coleman Hawkins, Roy Eldridge, Pete Brown, Jo Jones All Stars at Newport =

Live album by Coleman Hawkins, Roy Eldridge, Pete Brown and Jo Jones
- Released: 1957
- Recorded: July 5, 1957; Newport Jazz Festival, RI
- Genre: Jazz
- Length: 39:13
- Label: Verve; MGV 8240
- Producer: Norman Granz

Coleman Hawkins chronology
The Hawk Flies High (1957)	The Coleman Hawkins, Roy Eldridge, Pete Brown, Jo Jones All Stars at Newport (1957)	Coleman Hawkins Encounters Ben Webster (1957)

Roy Eldridge chronology
Swing Goes Dixie (1956)	The Coleman Hawkins, Roy Eldridge, Pete Brown, Jo Jones All Stars at Newport (1957)	That Warm Feeling (1957)

The Coleman Hawkins, Roy Eldridge, Pete Brown, Jo Jones All Stars at Newport is a live album by Coleman Hawkins's All Stars with Roy Eldridge, Pete Brown and Jo Jones recorded at the Newport Jazz Festival in 1957 and released on the Verve label.

== Reception ==
Professional ratings
Review scores
Source	Rating
Allmusic	3/5 stars
Disc	3/5 stars

The Allmusic site awarded the album 3 stars.

== Track listing ==
1. "I Can't Believe That You're in Love with Me" (Jimmy McHugh, Clarence Gaskill) - 13:52
2. "Day by Day" (Axel Stordahl, Paul Weston, Sammy Cahn) - 4:25
3. "Embraceable You" (George Gershwin, Ira Gershwin) - 2:20
4. "Moonglow" (Will Hudson, Irving Mills, Eddie DeLange) - 2:45
5. "Sweet Georgia Brown" (Ben Bernie, Maceo Pinkard, Kenneth Casey) - 13:51

== Personnel ==
- Coleman Hawkins - tenor saxophone (tracks 1, 4 & 5)
- Roy Eldridge - trumpet (tracks 1, 3 & 4), drums (track 5)
- Pete Brown - alto saxophone (tracks 1, 2, 4 & 5)
- Ray Bryant - piano
- Al McKibbon - bass
- Jo Jones - drums
