= Wrapped Tight =

1965 studio album by Coleman Hawkins

Studio album by Coleman Hawkins
- Released: 1965
- Recorded: February 22 and March 1, 1965
- Studio: Van Gelder, Englewood Cliffs, New Jersey
- Genre: Jazz
- Length: 43:08
- Label: Impulse!
- Producer: Bob Thiele

Coleman Hawkins chronology
Sonny Meets Hawk! (1963)	Wrapped Tight (1965)	The Hawk and the Hunter (1965)

Wrapped Tight is a studio album by the American jazz saxophonist Coleman Hawkins of performances recorded in 1965 for the Impulse! label.

== Reception ==
Professional ratings
Review scores
Source	Rating
AllMusic	4/5 stars
The Rolling Stone Jazz & Blues Album Guide	3/5 stars
The Penguin Guide to Jazz	2.5/4 stars
The Virgin Encyclopedia of Jazz	3/5 stars

In his review at AllMusic, Scott Yanow gave the album 4 stars, writing, "Hawkins's last strong recording finds the veteran, 43 years after his recording debut with Mamie Smith's Jazz Hounds, improvising creatively on a wide variety of material... [showing] that the tenor-saxophonist was still coming up with new ideas in 1965."

A reviewer for Billboard commented: "Manny Albam's arrangements guide the larger group with swinging style and grace. 'Beautiful Girl' and 'She's Fit' are particularly outstanding."

Writing for Life, Carter Harman called the album "another anthology of wonderful standards," and noted that it "proves that the tenorman, in his 40th year of fame, can still compete favorably with the younger crowd on their own terms."

A writer for Negro Digest stated that the album "drives home a lesson sorely needed in the often cultist world of jazz: that genuine artistry is a thing of its itself, transcending the superficialities of form, style and vogue."

== Track listing ==
1. "Marcheta" (Victor Schertzinger) – 3:06
2. "Intermezzo" (Pietro Mascagni) – 3:37
3. "Wrapped Tight" (Manny Albam) – 3:30
4. "Red Roses for a Blue Lady" (Sid Tepper, Roy C. Bennett) – 2:25
5. "She's Fit" (Coleman Hawkins) – 2:45
6. "Beautiful Girl" (Micki Marlow, Irene Frank) – 4:28
7. "And I Still Love You" (Pauline Rivelli, Ruth Roberts, Stanley Clayton) – 3:14
8. "Bean's Place" (Buck Clayton, Bob Hammer) – 2:57
9. "Here's That Rainy Day" (Johnny Burke, Jimmy Van Heusen) – 5:24
10. "I Won't Dance" (Oscar Hammerstein II, Otto Harbach, Jerome Kern) – 3:22
11. "Indian Summer" (Al Dubin, Victor Herbert) – 5:03
12. "Out of Nowhere" (Johnny Green, Edward Heyman) – 3:41

== Personnel ==
- Coleman Hawkins — tenor saxophone
- Bill Berry (tracks 1–3 & 7–8), Snooky Young (tracks 4–6) — trumpet
- Urbie Green — trombone
- Barry Harris — piano
- Buddy Catlett — double bass
- Eddie Locke — drums
