= The Hawk in Paris =

Studio album by Coleman Hawkins with Manny Albam and His Orchestra
- Released: 1957
- Recorded: July 9, 11 and 13, 1956
- Studio: Webster Hall, NYC
- Genre: Jazz
- Length: 38:48
- Label: Vik; LX-1059
- Producer: Jack Lewis

Coleman Hawkins chronology
The Hawk in Hi Fi (1956)	The Hawk in Paris (1957)	The Gilded Hawk (1957)

The Hawk in Paris is an album by saxophonist Coleman Hawkins featuring compositions related to Paris performed with an orchestra arranged and conducted by Manny Albam which was recorded in 1956 for the RCA Records subsidiary Vik label.

== Reception ==
Professional ratings
Review scores
Source	Rating
AllMusic	4/5 stars

Scott Yanow of AllMusic states, "Manny Albam's arrangements mostly avoid being muzaky and quite often are creative and witty. What could have been a novelty or an insipid affair is actually one of Coleman Hawkins's more memorable albums".

== Track listing ==
1. "April in Paris" (Vernon Duke, Yip Harburg) – 3:53
2. "Mon Homme" (Jacques Charles, Channing Pollock, Albert Willemetz, Maurice Yvain) – 3:19
3. "Under Paris Skies" (Hubert Giraud, Jean Dréjac) – 2:46
4. "Mimi" (Richard Rodgers, Lorenz Hart) – 3:08
5. "La Chnouf" (Marc Lanjean) – 3:07
6. "La Vie en Rose" (Louiguy, Édith Piaf, Mack David) – 2:37
7. "La Mer" (Charles Trenet) – 3:33
8. "Paris in the Spring" (Harry Revel, Gordon) – 3:15
9. "I Love Paris" (Cole Porter) – 3:31
10. "Mademoiselle de Paris" (Eric Maschwitz, Paul Durand) – 3:19
11. "Chiens Perdus Sans Collier (The Little Lost Dog)" (Paul Misraki) – 2:58
12. "Tu N' Peux T' Figurer (Dawn over Paris)" (Misraki) – 3:22

== Personnel ==
- Coleman Hawkins – tenor saxophone
- Manny Albam – arranger, conductor
- Romeo Penque – saxophone, flute
- Al Epstein – saxophone
- Nick Travis – trumpet
- Urbie Green, Chauncey Welsch – trombone
- Ray Beckenstein – flute
- Tosha Samaroff, Paul Gershman, Leo Kruczek, Max Cahn, Alvin Rudintsky, Jack Zayde, Sy Miroff – violin
- Lucien Schmit, George Ricci, Pete Makis – cello
- Janet Putnam – harp
- Marty Wilson – vibraphone
- Hank Jones – piano
- Barry Galbraith – guitar
- Arnold Fishkind – bass
- Osie Johnson – drums
