= Soul Shoutin' =

Studio album by Shirley Scott
- Released: July 1964
- Recorded: October 15, 1963
- Studio: Van Gelder Studio, Englewood Cliffs, NJ
- Genre: Jazz, Blues
- Length: 34:55
- Label: Prestige; PRLP 7312
- Producer: Ozzie Cadena

Shirley Scott chronology
For Members Only (1964)	Soul Shoutin' (1964)	Travelin' Light (1964)

Alternative cover
- CD cover

Professional ratings
Review scores
Source	Rating
Allmusic	5/5 stars
The Penguin Guide to Jazz Recordings	3.5/4 stars

Soul Shoutin' is a collaboration studio album by organist Shirley Scott recorded in 1963 for Prestige and issued in 1964 as PRLP 7312. It also features her then husband, saxophonist Stanley Turrentine. In 1995, the album was reissued on the same CD along with The Soul Is Willing, featuring a different track order.

== Track listing ==
1. "Gravy Waltz" (Ray Brown, Steve Allen) - 4:27
2. "In the Still of the Night" (Cole Porter) - 7:04
3. "Deep Down Soul" (Turrentine) - 9:42
4. "Serenata" (Leroy Anderson, Mitchell Parish) - 8:01
5. "Soul Shoutin'" (Turrentine) - 5:41

== Personnel ==
- Shirley Scott - organ
- Stanley Turrentine - tenor saxophone
- Earl May - bass
- Grassella Oliphant - drums
