= Sirius (Coleman Hawkins album) =

Studio album by Coleman Hawkins
- Released: 1974
- Recorded: December 20, 1966
- Studio: New York City
- Genre: Jazz
- Length: 41:20
- Label: Pablo; 2310 707
- Producer: Norman Granz

Coleman Hawkins chronology
The Hawk & the Hunter (1965)	Sirius (1974)	The Greatest Jazz Concert in the World (1967)

Sirius is an album by saxophonist Coleman Hawkins recorded in 1966 but not released by the Pablo label until 1974.

== Reception ==
Professional ratings
Review scores
Source	Rating
AllMusic	1/5 stars
The Penguin Guide to Jazz Recordings	2.5/4 stars

AllMusic reviewer Scott Yanow stated "Hawkins's final studio session is rather sad ... Recorded in late 1966, this quartet set finds Hawk constantly short of breath and unable to play long phrases. He is able to get away with this deficiency on the faster pieces but the ballads are rather painful to hear. Even at this late stage Hawkins still had his majestic tone but this recording is only of historical interest".

== Track listing ==
1. "The Man I Love" (George Gershwin, Ira Gershwin) – 5:09
2. "Don't Blame Me" (Jimmy McHugh, Dorothy Fields) – 4:38
3. "Just a Gigolo" (Leonello Casucci, Irving Caesar) – 2:56
4. "The One I Love (Belongs to Somebody Else)" (Isham Jones, Gus Kahn) – 3:53
5. "Time on My Hands" (Vincent Youmans, Harold Adamson, Mack Gordon) – 4:03
6. "Sweet and Lovely" (Gus Arnheim, Jules LeMare, Harry Tobias) – 4:24
7. "Exactly Like You" (McHugh, Fields) – 6:52
8. "Street of Dreams" (Victor Young, Sam M. Lewis) – 4:12
9. "Sugar" (Maceo Pinkard, Edna Alexander, Sidney Mitchell) – 5:13

== Personnel ==
- Coleman Hawkins – tenor saxophone
- Barry Harris – piano
- Bob Cranshaw – bass
- Eddie Locke – drums
