= Desafinado (album) =

Studio album by Coleman Hawkins
- Released: November 1962
- Recorded: September 12 & 17, 1962
- Studio: Van Gelder, Englewood Cliffs, New Jersey
- Genre: Jazz
- Length: 35:36
- Label: Impulse! A-28
- Producer: Bob Thiele

Coleman Hawkins chronology
Bluesy Burrell (1962)	Desafinado (1962)	Back in Bean's Bag (1962)

Desafinado is an album by American jazz saxophonist Coleman Hawkins featuring performances recorded in 1962 for the Impulse! label.

== Reception ==
Harvey Pekar's January 17, 1963 review for Down Beat magazine stated "There have been some gimmicky bossa nova albums issued recently, but this one features music of high and enduring quality."

The Allmusic review by Michael G. Nastos awarded the album 4 stars stating "The simplified style of this album overall perfectly suited the amiable, good-natured, and laid-back Hawkins."

Professional ratings
Review scores
Source	Rating
Down Beat (Original Lp release)	4.5/5 stars
Allmusic	4/5 stars
The Penguin Guide to Jazz Recordings	3/4 stars

== Track listing ==
1. "Desafinado" (Antonio Carlos Jobim, Newton Mendonça) — 5:48
2. "I'm Looking Over a Four Leaf Clover (Jazz Samba)" (Mort Dixon, Harry M. Woods) — 2:52
3. "Samba Para Bean" (Manny Albam) — 5:28
4. "I Remember You" (Johnny Mercer, Victor Schertzinger) — 3:58
5. "One Note Samba" (Jobim, Mendonça) — 5:59
6. "O Pato (The Duck)" (Jayme Silva, Neuza Teixeira) — 4:10
7. "Un Abraco No Bonfa (An Embrace to Bonfa)" (João Gilberto) — 4:51
8. "Stumpy Bossa Nova" (Coleman Hawkins) — 2:30

Recorded on September 12, 1962 (#2–5) and 17, 1962 (#1, 6–8).

== Personnel ==
- Coleman Hawkins — tenor saxophone
- Howard Collins, Barry Galbraith — guitar
- Major Holley — bass
- Eddie Locke — drums, percussion
- Tommy Flanagan — claves
- Willie Rodriguez — percussion
- Manny Albam — arranger
