= Ballads & Blues (Tommy Flanagan album) =

1978 studio album by Tommy Flanagan

Studio album by Tommy Flanagan
- Released: 1978
- Recorded: November 15, 1978
- Studio: Penthouse, New York City
- Genre: Jazz
- Length: 59:07
- Label: Enja; 3031
- Producer: Horst Weber, Matthias Winckelmann

Tommy Flanagan chronology
Confirmation (1978)	Ballads & Blues (1978)	The Super Jazz Trio (1978)

Ballads & Blues is a studio album by pianist Tommy Flanagan with bassist George Mraz, recorded in 1978 for the Enja label.

== Reception ==
Professional ratings
Review scores
Source	Rating
AllMusic	3/5 stars
The Penguin Guide to Jazz	3/4 stars

Scott Yanow's review in AllMusic stated: "The intimate and mostly lightly swinging music is fine, but one does miss the momentum that would have been provided by a drummer".

== Track listing ==
All compositions by Tommy Flanagan except where noted.

1. "Blue Twenty" – 5:59
2. "Scrapple from the Apple" (Charlie Parker) – 4:32
3. "With Malice Towards None" (Tom McIntosh) – 8:58
4. "Blues for Sarka" (George Mraz) – 6:17
5. "Star Eyes" (Gene de Paul, Don Raye) – 6:32
6. "They Say It's Spring" (Bob Haymes, Marty Clark) – 5:28
7. "Birks' Works" (Dizzy Gillespie) – 5:56
8. "Fifty-Twenty One" (Thad Jones) – 6:34 Bonus track on CD
9. "Toward None" – 8:51 Bonus track on CD

== Personnel ==
- Tommy Flanagan – piano
- George Mraz – bass
