= Solo Piano (Tommy Flanagan album) =

Studio album by Tommy Flanagan
- Released: 2005
- Recorded: 1974
- Genre: Jazz
- Label: Storyville

Tommy Flanagan chronology
The Tommy Flanagan Trio (1960)	Solo Piano (2005)	The Tommy Flanagan Tokyo Recital (1975)

Professional ratings
Review scores
Source	Rating
AllMusic	4.5/5 stars
The Penguin Guide to Jazz	3.5/4 stars

Solo Piano is an album by jazz pianist Tommy Flanagan. It was recorded in 1974 and released in 2005 by Storyville Records.

== Background and recording ==
Prior to the release of Solo Piano, the 1977 album Alone Too Long had been believed to be Flanagan's first solo piano recording. Tracks 1–11 of Solo Piano were recorded in Zurich in 1974, when he was vocalist Ella Fitzgerald's pianist. Tracks 12–20 were recorded at an unknown date by another pianist, who critic Ken Dryden has suggested was Adam Makowicz.

Flanagan played bebop numbers and standards on the album. These include "Con Alma".

== Release ==
The album was released on CD by Storyville Records in 2005. Storyville removed the CD from the catalog after it was discovered that some of the tracks had been played by another pianist and added to the album by mistake.

== Track listing ==
=== Revised track listing ===
1. "Parisian Thoroughfare" (Bud Powell) – 3:37
2. "Wail" (Powell) – 2:39
3. "Isn't It Romantic" (Richard Rodgers, Lorenz Hart) – 3:38
4. "A Sleepin' Bee" (Harold Arlen, Truman Capote) – 4:47
5. "Yesterdays" (Jerome Kern, Otto Harbach) – 3:30
6. "Stompin' at the Savoy" (Edgar Sampson, Chick Webb, Benny Goodman) – 4:42
7. "Passion Flower" / "Chelsea Bridge" / "The Star-Crossed Lovers" / "U.M.M.G." (Billy Strayhorn) – 11:52
8. "Con Alma" (Dizzy Gillespie) – 3:07
9. "If You Could See Me Now" (Tadd Dameron, Carl Sigman) – 3:27
10. "Ruby, My Dear" (Thelonious Monk) – 3:03
11. "Lover" (Rodgers, Hart) – 2:48

Note

- AllMusic suggests that "Lover" was not played by Flanagan; jazzdiscography lists it as a Flanagan performance. Other tracks, consistently listed as being by a different pianist, are not part of the revised track listing.

=== Original track listing ===
1. "Parisian Thoroughfare" (Bud Powell) – 3:37
2. "Wail" (Powell) – 2:39
3. "Isn't It Romantic" (Richard Rodgers, Lorenz Hart) – 3:38
4. "A Sleepin' Bee" (Harold Arlen, Truman Capote) – 4:47
5. "Yesterdays" (Jerome Kern, Otto Harbach) – 3:30
6. "Stompin' at the Savoy" (Edgar Sampson, Chick Webb, Benny Goodman) – 4:42
7. "Passion Flower" / "Chelsea Bridge" / "The Star-Crossed Lovers" / "U.M.M.G." (Billy Strayhorn) – 11:52
8. "Con Alma" (Dizzy Gillespie) – 3:07
9. "If You Could See Me Now" (Tadd Dameron, Carl Sigman) – 3:27
10. "Ruby, My Dear" (Thelonious Monk) – 3:03
11. "Lover" (Rodgers, Hart) – 2:48
12. "Rosetta" (Earl Hines, Henri Woode) – 2:17
13. "Jitterbug Waltz" (Fats Waller) – 2:52
14. "Caravan" (Duke Ellington, Irving Mills, Juan Tizol) – 1:41
15. "Willow Weep for Me" (Ann Ronnell) – 3:27
16. "Just One of Those Things" (Cole Porter) – 2:36
17. "Poor Butterfly" (Raymond Hubbell) – 2:50
18. "Well, You Needn't" (Monk) – 1:55
19. "St. Louis Blues" (W. C. Handy) – 2:18
20. "All the Things You Are" (Oscar Hammerstein II, Jerome Kern) – 4:10

== Personnel ==
- Tommy Flanagan – piano (tracks 1–11)
- Unknown; possibly Adam Makowicz – piano (tracks 12–20)
