= You're Me =

Studio album by Tommy Flanagan, Red Mitchell
- Released: 1980
- Recorded: February 24, 1980
- Genre: Jazz

Tommy Flanagan chronology
The Standard (1980)	You're Me (1980)	...And a Little Pleasure (1981)

Professional ratings
Review scores
Source	Rating
AllMusic	3/5 stars
The Penguin Guide to Jazz	3/4 stars

You're Me is an album by pianist Tommy Flanagan and bassist Red Mitchell.

== Music and recording ==
The album was recorded on February 24, 1980, in New York City. The version of "Milestones" recorded is not the 1958 composition, but an earlier tune.

== Track listing ==
1. "You're Me" (Red Mitchell) – 4:31
2. "Darn That Dream" (Jimmy Van Heusen, Edgar DeLange) – 8:11
3. "What Am I Here For?" (Duke Ellington, Frankie Laine) – 4:50
4. "When I Have You" (Mitchell) – 7:31
5. "All the Things You Are" (Jerome Kern, Oscar Hammerstein II) – 6:45
6. "Milestones" (Miles Davis) – 4:59
7. "Whisper Not" (Benny Golson) – 6:54
8. "There Will Never Be Another You" (Harry Warren, Mack Gordon) – 5:14

== Personnel ==
- Tommy Flanagan – piano
- Red Mitchell – bass
