= The Master Trio =

Studio album by Tommy Flanagan, Ron Carter and Tony Williams
- Released: 1983
- Recorded: June 16–17, 1983
- Studio: A&R Recording Studio, New York City
- Genre: Jazz
- Label: Baybridge
- Producer: Kiyoshi Koyama

Tommy Flanagan chronology
| I'm All Smiles (1983) | The Master Trio (1983) | Blues in the Closet (1983) |

Professional ratings
Review scores
| Source | Rating |
|---|---|
| AllMusic | 4/5 stars |
| The Penguin Guide to Jazz Recordings | 3/4 stars |

The Master Trio is an album by jazz pianist Tommy Flanagan, bassist Ron Carter and drummer Tony Williams.

== Background ==
Pianist Tommy Flanagan and bassist Ron Carter had recorded together numerous times since 1960. In contrast, this recording session (which also resulted in the album Blues in the Closet) was Flanagan's only recording with drummer Tony Williams.

== Recording and music ==
The album was recorded on June 16 and 17, 1983, at A&R Recording Studio in New York City. "It Don't Mean a Thing" is played in D minor and at a medium tempo. Carter uses a lot of quotations in his solo on "St. Thomas". "Angel Eyes" is played in A minor. "New Song #3" is a Carter composition. Flanagan's "Minor Mishap" has an AABA structure, with the first and last A sections in B-flat minor, and the second in F minor.

== Release ==
The album was released in Japan by Baybridge.

== Track listing ==
1. "It Don't Mean a Thing" (Duke Ellington, Irving Mills)
2. "St. Thomas" (Sonny Rollins)
3. "Angel Eyes" (Earl Brent, Matt Dennis)
4. "New Song #3" (Ron Carter)
5. "Minor Mishap" (Tommy Flanagan)
6. "Misterioso" (Thelonious Monk)
7. "Milestones" (Miles Davis)

== Personnel ==
- Tommy Flanagan – piano
- Ron Carter – bass
- Tony Williams – drums
