= The Tommy Flanagan Tokyo Recital =

Studio album by Tommy Flanagan
- Released: 1975
- Recorded: February 15, 1975
- Genre: Jazz
- Label: Pablo
- Producer: Norman Granz

Tommy Flanagan chronology
Solo Piano (1974)	The Tommy Flanagan Tokyo Recital (1975)	Trinity (1976)

Professional ratings
Review scores
Source	Rating
AllMusic	4/5 stars
The Penguin Guide to Jazz	3/4 stars

The Tommy Flanagan Tokyo Recital is an album by jazz pianist Tommy Flanagan. It is a trio album, recorded in 1975, with bassist Keter Betts and drummer Bobby Durham.

== Background and recording ==
This album was recorded on February 15, 1975, after Flanagan had been vocalist Ella Fitzgerald's pianist for seven consecutive years. It was his first album release as leader since 1960.

== Music ==
The trio play compositions by Duke Ellington and Billy Strayhorn.

== Track listing ==
1. "All Day Long" (Billy Strayhorn) – 5:12
2. "U.M.M.G." (Strayhorn) – 4:42
3. "Something to Live For" (Duke Ellington, Strayhorn) – 3:04
4. "Main Stem" (Ellington) – 6:55
5. "Day Dream" (Ellington, John Latouche, Strayhorn) – 4:40
6. "The Intimacy of the Blues" (Strayhorn) – 6:10
7. "Caravan" (Ellington, Irving Mills, Juan Tizol) – 6:46
8. "Chelsea Bridge" (Strayhorn) – 6:17
9. "Take the 'A' Train" (Strayhorn) – 5:17

== Personnel ==
- Tommy Flanagan – piano
- Keter Betts – bass
- Bobby Durham – drums
