= The Tommy Flanagan Trio =

Studio album by Tommy Flanagan
- Released: 1960
- Recorded: May 18, 1960
- Studio: Van Gelder Studio, Englewood Cliffs, New Jersey
- Genre: Jazz
- Length: 33:35
- Label: Moodsville; MVLP 9
- Producer: Esmond Edwards

Tommy Flanagan chronology
Lonely Town (1959)	The Tommy Flanagan Trio (1960)	Solo Piano (1974)

The Tommy Flanagan Trio is an album by jazz pianist Tommy Flanagan, recorded in 1960 and released on the Moodsville label.

== Reception ==
Professional ratings
Review scores
Source	Rating
AllMusic	3/5 stars
The Penguin Guide to Jazz	3/4 stars

AllMusic stated, "Since this set (reissued on CD) was originally recorded for the Prestige subsidiary Moodsville, most of the selections are taken at slow tempoes... quietly and with taste".

== Track listing ==
1. "In the Blue of the Evening" (Tom Adair, Alfonso D'Artega) - 3:44
2. "You Go to My Head" (J. Fred Coots, Haven Gillespie) - 4:30
3. "Velvet Moon" (Eddie DeLange, Josef Myrow) - 5:22
4. "Come Sunday" (Duke Ellington) - 3:38
5. "Born to Be Blue" (Mel Tormé, Robert Wells) - 4:24
6. "Jes' Fine" (Tommy Flanagan) - 5:34
7. "In a Sentimental Mood" (Ellington, Irving Mills) - 6:39

== Personnel ==
- Tommy Flanagan - piano - solo track 4
- Tommy Potter - bass
- Roy Haynes - drums
