= I'm All Smiles (Hank Jones and Tommy Flanagan album) =

Live album by Tommy Flanagan and Hank Jones
- Released: 1984
- Recorded: May 7, 1983
- Venue: Franziskaner Concert Hall in Villingen, West Germany
- Genre: Jazz
- Length: 47:17
- Label: MPS; MPS 15594
- Producer: Hans Georg Brunner-Schwer

Tommy Flanagan chronology
Thelonica (1982)	I'm All Smiles (1984)	The Master Trio (1983)

Hank Jones chronology
The Club New Yorker (1983)	I'm All Smiles (1983)	Eri Sings Cole Porter: Easy to Love (1983)

I'm All Smiles is a live album by pianists Tommy Flanagan and Hank Jones recorded in Germany in 1983 for the MPS label.

== Reception ==
Professional ratings
Review scores
Source	Rating
Allmusic	4/5 stars

Allmusic awarded the album 4 stars, stating: "The two pianists have the kind of feel for one another's playing that avoids the crash of egos and instead inspires the give and take necessary for each performance to reach its full potential".

== Track listing ==
1. "Relaxin' at Camarillo" (Charlie Parker) - 5:20
2. "In a Sentimental Mood" (Duke Ellington, Manny Kurtz, Irving Mills) - 7:37
3. "Some Day My Prince Will Come" (Frank Churchill, Larry Morey) - 6:54
4. "Afternoon in Paris" (John Lewis) - 4:29
5. "Au Privave" (Parker) - 6:20
6. "I'm All Smiles" (Michael Leonard, Herbert Martin) - 5:04
7. "Rockin' in Rhythm" (Harry Carney, Ellington, Mills) - 4:47
8. "Con Alma" (Dizzy Gillespie) - 6:46

== Personnel ==
- Hank Jones - Steinway Concert Grand Piano (tracks 5–8), Bösendorfer Imperial Concert Grand Piano (tracks 1–4)
- Tommy Flanagan - Steinway Concert Grand Piano (tracks 1–4), Bösendorfer Imperial Concert Grand Piano (tracks 5–8)
