= Bluesy Burrell =

Studio album by Kenny Burrell with Coleman Hawkins
- Released: January 1963
- Recorded: September 14, 1962
- Studio: Van Gelder Studio, Englewood Cliffs, NJ
- Genre: Jazz
- Length: 39:04
- Label: Moodsville; MV 29
- Producer: Ozzie Cadena

Kenny Burrell chronology
Bluesin' Around (1962)	Bluesy Burrell (1963)	Midnight Blue (1963)

Coleman Hawkins chronology
Today and Now (1962)	Bluesy Burrell (1962)	Desafinado (1962)

Bluesy Burrell (also released as Out of This World) is an album by guitarist Kenny Burrell with saxophonist Coleman Hawkins recorded in 1962 and originally released on the Moodsville label.

== Reception ==
Professional ratings
Review scores
Source	Rating
Down Beat	4/5 stars
AllMusic	3/5 stars
The Penguin Guide to Jazz Recordings	4/4 stars

AllMusic awarded the album 3 stars stating "This session is valuable for the majestic playing of tenor great Coleman Hawkins, who performs on half of the eight tracks". The All About Jazz review stated "It's definitely a variety album, with many tunes to choose from. Burrell is the star (his high ringing tone also plays octaves here and there), but everyone has their time in the spotlight, especially Hawkins, having a grand time on his last session for Prestige".

== Track listing ==
All compositions by Kenny Burrell except where noted

1. "Tres Palabras" (Osvaldo Farrés) – 6:40
2. "No More" – 1:50
3. "Guilty" (Harry Akst, Gus Kahn, Richard A. Whiting) – 4:15
4. "Montono Blues" – 4:40
5. "I Thought About You" (Jimmy Van Heusen, Johnny Mercer) – 4:40
6. "Out of This World" (Harold Arlen, Johnny Mercer) – 4:50
7. "It's Getting Dark" – 6:50

== Personnel ==
- Kenny Burrell – guitar
- Coleman Hawkins – tenor saxophone (tracks 1, 4, 5 & 7)
- Tommy Flanagan – piano
- Major Holley – bass
- Eddie Locke – drums
- Ray Barretto – congas
