= Good Old Broadway =

Studio album by Coleman Hawkins
- Released: 1962
- Recorded: January 2, 1962
- Studio: Van Gelder, Englewood Cliffs, New Jersey
- Genre: Jazz
- Length: 35:03
- Label: Moodsville; MV 23
- Producer: Esmond Edwards

Coleman Hawkins chronology
Things Ain't What They Used to Be (1961)	Good Old Broadway (1962)	The Jazz Version of No Strings (1962)

Good Old Broadway is an album by saxophonist Coleman Hawkins which was recorded in 1962 and released on the Moodsville label.

== Reception ==
Professional ratings
Review scores
Source	Rating
Allmusic	3/5 stars
Down Beat	3/5 stars

Allmusic awarded the album 3 stars.

== Track listing ==
1. "I Talk to the Trees" (Alan Jay Lerner, Frederick Loewe) - 4:23
2. "Smoke Gets in Your Eyes" (Otto Harbach, Jerome Kern) - 4:40
3. "Wanting You" (Oscar Hammerstein II, Sigmund Romberg) - 2:26
4. "Strange Music" (George Forrest, Robert Wright, Edvard Grieg) - 6:17
5. "The Man That Got Away" (Harold Arlen, Ira Gershwin) - 4:08
6. "Get Out of Town" (Cole Porter) - 4:14
7. "Here I'll Stay" (Alan Jay Lerner, Kurt Weill) - 4:08
8. "A Fellow Needs a Girl" (Hammerstein, Richard Rodgers) - 4:47

== Personnel ==
- Coleman Hawkins - tenor saxophone
- Tommy Flanagan - piano
- Major Holley - bass
- Eddie Locke - drums
