= Hawkins! Alive! At the Village Gate =

Live album by Coleman Hawkins
- Released: 1963
- Recorded: August 13 and 15, 1962
- Venue: Village Gate, NYC
- Genre: Jazz
- Length: 52:54
- Label: Verve; V/V6 8509
- Producer: Creed Taylor

Coleman Hawkins chronology
Hawkins! Eldridge! Hodges! Alive! At the Village Gate! (1962)	Hawkins! Alive! At the Village Gate (1963)	Coleman Hawkins Plays Make Someone Happy from Do Re Mi (1962)

Hawkins! Alive! At the Village Gate is a live album by saxophonist Coleman Hawkins which was recorded at the Village Gate in 1962 and released on the Verve label.

== Reception ==
Professional ratings
Review scores
Source	Rating
AllMusic	4/5 stars

AllMusic stated "The great Hawkins (who debuted on records 40 years earlier) gets to stretch out on this live outing by his 1962 quartet ... Coleman Hawkins in his late 50s was still a powerful force.

== Track listing ==
1. "All the Things You Are" (Jerome Kern, Oscar Hammerstein II) – 8:16
2. "Joshua Fit the Battle of Jericho" (Traditional) – 10:43
3. "Mack the Knife" (Kurt Weill, Bertolt Brecht) – 8:50
4. "It's the Talk of the Town" (Jerry Livingston, Al J. Neiburg, Marty Symes) – 9:28
5. "Bean and the Boys" (Coleman Hawkins) – 7:02 Additional track on CD release
6. "If I Had You" (Ted Shapiro, Irving King) – 8:35 Additional track on CD release

== Personnel ==
- Coleman Hawkins – tenor saxophone
- Tommy Flanagan – piano
- Major Holley – bass
- Eddie Locke – drums
