= Something Borrowed, Something Blue =

1978 studio album by Tommy Flanagan

Studio album by Tommy Flanagan
- Released: 1978
- Recorded: January 30, 1978
- Studio: Fantasy, Berkeley, California
- Genre: Jazz
- Length: 38:31
- Label: Galaxy; GXY 5110
- Producer: Ed Michel

Tommy Flanagan chronology
| More Delights (1978) | Something Borrowed, Something Blue (1978) | Tommy Flanagan Plays the Music of Harold Arlen (1978) |

Something Borrowed, Something Blue is a studio album by pianist Tommy Flanagan. It was recorded in 1978 for the Galaxy label.

== Reception ==
Professional ratings
Review scores
| Source | Rating |
|---|---|
| AllMusic | 3.5/5 stars |
| The Penguin Guide to Jazz Recordings | 3/4 stars |
| Jazz Journal | 5/5 stars |

The review by Scott Yanow in AllMusic stated: "This is a typically flawless trio set from the tasteful and swinging bop-based pianist Tommy Flanagan... If Flanagan had not recorded so many equally rewarding sets during the past 20 years, this fine CD would have received a higher rating; virtually every one of his recordings is well worth picking up".

The album was among a few records chosen as "Pick of the Month" in Jazz Journal International December 1978 edition. In a very positive review, Mike Hennessey stated: "This is almost certainly the best album Tommy Flanagan has ever recorded... An album of rare excellence."

== Track listing ==
1. "Bird Song" (Thad Jones) - 4:47
2. "Good Bait" (Tadd Dameron, Count Basie) - 4:06
3. "Peace" (Horace Silver) - 6:13
4. "Friday the 13th" (Thelonious Monk) - 3:51
5. "Something Borrowed, Something Blue" (Tommy Flanagan) - 6:36
6. "West Coast Blues" (Wes Montgomery) - 6:43
7. "Groovin' High" (Dizzy Gillespie) - 6:16

== Personnel ==
- Tommy Flanagan - piano, electric piano
- Keter Betts - bass
- Jimmie Smith - drums
