= Coleman Hawkins Plays Make Someone Happy from Do Re Mi =

Studio album by Coleman Hawkins
- Released: 1962
- Recorded: April 16, 1962
- Studio: Van Gelder, Englewood Cliffs, New Jersey
- Genre: Jazz
- Length: 32:39
- Label: Moodsville; MV 31
- Producer: Esmond Edwards

Coleman Hawkins chronology
Hawkins! Alive! At the Village Gate (1962)	Coleman Hawkins Plays Make Someone Happy from Do Re Mi (1962)	Duke Ellington Meets Coleman Hawkins (1962)

Coleman Hawkins Plays Make Someone Happy from Do Re Mi is an album by saxophonist Coleman Hawkins which was recorded in 1962 and released on the Moodsville label., featuring tracks from the 1960 broadway musicals Do Re Mi.

== Reception ==
Professional ratings
Review scores
Source	Rating
Allmusic	3/5 stars

Allmusic awarded the album 3 stars.

== Track listing ==
1. "Wouldn't It Be Loverly" (Alan Jay Lerner, Frederick Loewe) - 7:45
2. "Cry Like the Wind" (Jule Styne, Betty Comden, Adolph Green) - 4:30
3. "Climb Ev'ry Mountain" (Richard Rodgers, Oscar Hammerstein II) - 4:29
4. "Make Someone Happy" (Styne, Comden, Green) - 3:03
5. "Out of My Dreams" (Rodgers, Hammerstein) - 4:48
6. "Have I Told You Lately?" (Harold Rome) - 3:22
7. "I Believe In You" (Frank Loesser) - 4:42

== Personnel ==
- Coleman Hawkins - tenor saxophone
- Tommy Flanagan - piano
- Major Holley - bass
- Eddie Locke - drums
