= The Super Jazz Trio =

Studio album by The Super Jazz Trio
- Released: 1979
- Recorded: November 21, 1978
- Studio: Sound Ideas Studios, New York City
- Genre: Jazz
- Length: 42:05
- Label: Baystate
- Producer: Yoshio Ozawa

Tommy Flanagan chronology
Ballads & Blues (1978)	The Super Jazz Trio (1979)	Together (1978)

The Super Jazz Trio is an eponymous album by the band consisting of pianist Tommy Flanagan, bassist Reggie Workman, and drummer Joe Chambers.

== Background ==
The Super Jazz Trio was formed in 1978 by pianist Tommy Flanagan, bassist Reggie Workman, and drummer Joe Chambers. This eponymous album was the band's first release.

== Music and recording ==
The album was recorded at Sound Ideas Studios in New York City on November 21, 1978. The Chambers composition "Condado Beach" is a bossa nova.

== Releases ==
It was released by the Japanese label Baystate. It was reissued by Jazz Row, with added material featuring Flanagan and other musicians, in 2009.

== Track listing ==
1. "Pent Up House" (Sonny Rollins) – 5:28
2. "Condado Beach" (Joe Chambers) – 10:17
3. "Let's Call This" (Thelonious Monk) – 7:13
4. "So Sorry Please" (Bud Powell) – 8:00
5. "Ballad" (Tommy Flanagan) – 4:28
6. "Milestones" (Miles Davis) – 6:39

== Personnel ==
- Tommy Flanagan – piano
- Reggie Workman – bass
- Joe Chambers – drums
