= Major Holley =

American jazz double bassist (1924–1990)

- Born: Major Holley Jr. July 10, 1924; Detroit, Michigan, U.S.
- Died: October 25, 1990 (aged 66) Maplewood, New Jersey, U.S.
- Genres: Jazz
- Occupations: Musician; professor
- Instrument: Double bass
- Years active: 1940s–1990
- Labels: Black & Blue; PM; Timeless
- Formerly of: Woody Herman Herd; Duke Ellington Orchestra; Kenny Burrell Trio

Major "Mule" Holley Jr. (July 10, 1924 – October 25, 1990) was an American jazz double bassist.

== Early life and education ==
Holley was born in Detroit, Michigan, United States. While young, he played violin and tuba. He attended the prestigious Cass Technical High School in Detroit.

== Career ==
Holley began playing bass while serving in the U.S. Navy, playing in the Ships Company A Band at Camp Robert Smalls, which was led by Leonard Bowden and included Clark Terry and several other musicians recruited from civilian dance bands. In the latter half of the 1940s, he played with Dexter Gordon, Charlie Parker, and Ella Fitzgerald; in 1950, he and Oscar Peterson recorded duets, and he also played with Peterson and Charlie Smith as a trio. He was married to Minnie Walton (born Millicent Aitcheson).

In the mid-1950s, he moved to England and worked at the BBC. Upon his return to America, he toured with Woody Herman in 1958 and with Al Cohn / Zoot Sims between 1959 and 1960. A prolific studio musician, he played with Duke Ellington in 1964 and with the Kenny Burrell Trio, Coleman Hawkins, Lee Konitz, Roy Eldridge, Michel Legrand, Milt Buckner, Jay McShann, and Quincy Jones in the 1960s and 1970s. From 1967 to 1970, he taught at the Berklee College of Music.

Holley was known for singing along with his arco (bowed) bass solos, a technique Slam Stewart also used. Holley and Stewart recorded two albums together.

== Death ==
Holley died of a heart attack in Maplewood, New Jersey, at the age of 66.

== Discography ==
=== As leader ===
- Two Big Mice with Slam Stewart (Black & Blue, 1977)
- Shut Yo' Mouth! with Slam Stewart (PM, 1987)
- Major Step with Joe Van Enkhuizen (Timeless, 1992)
- Excuse Me Ludwig (Black & Blue, 1997)
- Mighty Like a Rose with Rose Murphy (Black & Blue, 1998)

=== As sideman ===
With Peter Appleyard

- Barbados Heat (Concord Jazz, 1990)
- Barbados Cool (Concord Jazz, 1991)

With Kenny Burrell

- Midnight Blue (Blue Note, 1963)
- Bluesy Burrell (Moodsville, 1963)
- Bluesin' Around (Columbia, 1983)

With Eddie "Lockjaw" Davis

- Light and Lovely (Black & Blue, 1979)
- Midnight Slows Vol. 10 (Black & Blue, 1979)

With Coleman Hawkins

- Good Old Broadway (Moodsville, 1962)
- Today and Now (Impulse!, 1962)
- The Jazz Version of No Strings (Moodsville, 1962)
- Hawkins! Eldridge! Hodges! Alive! At the Village Gate! (Verve, 1962)
- Hawkins! Alive! At the Village Gate (Verve, 1963)
- Coleman Hawkins Plays Make Someone Happy from Do Re Mi (Moodsville, 1963)
- Desafinado (Impulse!, 1963)
- Back in Bean's Bag (Columbia, 1963)

With Jo Jones

- Papa Jo and His Friends (Denon, 1978)
- Our Man, Papa Jo! (Denon, 1978)

With Quincy Jones

- Quincy Jones Plays Hip Hits (Mercury, 1963)
- Quincy Jones Explores the Music of Henry Mancini (Mercury, 1964)
- Gula Matari (A&M, 1970)
- I Heard That!! (A&M, 1976)

With B. B. King

- Blues 'N' Jazz (MCA, 1983)

With Rahsaan Roland Kirk

- Here Comes the Whistleman (Atlantic, 1967)
- A Meeting of the Times (Atlantic, 1972)

With Buddy Tate

- The Texas Twister (Master Jazz, 1975)
- Just Jazz (Uptown, 1984)
- Just Friends (Muse, 1992)

With Clark Terry

- Tread Ye Lightly (Cameo, 1964)
- Having Fun (Delos, 1990)

With Joe Williams

- Having the Blues Under European Sky (Denon, 1985)

With others

- Totti Bergh, Major Blues (Gemini, 1991)
- Milt Buckner, Block Chords Parade (Black & Blue, 1974)
- Jaki Byard, Family Man (Muse, 1978)
- Johnny Guarnieri, Johnny Guarnieri Originals (1979)
- Bob James, Sign of the Times (1981)
- Rufus Jones, Five on Eight (Cameo, 1964)
- Dave McKenna, Dave McKenna Quartet with Zoot Sims (Chiaroscuro, 1974)
- Jay McShann, Some Blues (Chiaroscuro, 1993)
- Flip Phillips, The Claw (Chiaroscuro, 1986)
- Richie Pratt, Olathe (Artists Recording Collective, 2007)
- Hilton Ruiz, Crosscurrents (Stash, 1985)
- Shirley Scott, The Soul Is Willing (Prestige, 1963)
- Shirley Scott, Drag 'em Out (Prestige, 1963)
- Frank Sinatra, L.A. Is My Lady (Qwest, 1984)
- Stanley Turrentine, Never Let Me Go (Blue Note, 1963)
- Dicky Wells, Bones for the King (Felsted, 1958)
- Dicky Wells, Trombone Four-in-Hand (Felsted, 1959)
- Gerry Wiggins, Wig Is Here (Black & Blue, 1974)
- Phil Woods, Directly from the Half Note (Philology, 1966)
