= Tommy Flanagan Plays the Music of Harold Arlen =

Studio album by Tommy Flanagan
- Released: 1979
- Recorded: September 30, October 2, 1978
- Genre: Jazz
- Label: Trio
- Producer: Helen Merrill

Tommy Flanagan chronology
Something Borrowed, Something Blue (1978)	Tommy Flanagan Plays the Music of Harold Arlen (1979)	Confirmation (1977–78)

Professional ratings
Review scores
Source	Rating
AllMusic	3/5 stars
The Penguin Guide to Jazz	2.5/4 stars

Tommy Flanagan Plays the Music of Harold Arlen is an album by jazz pianist Tommy Flanagan, with bassist George Mraz and drummer Connie Kay.

== Recording and music ==
The album was recorded on September 30 and October 2, 1978, at SNS Productions, New York City. It was produced by Helen Merrill, who also sang on "Last Night When We Were Young". The compositions are by Harold Arlen and co-writers.

== Releases ==
The album was originally released in Japan by Trio Records. It was subsequently released on CD in Japan by DIW and on LP in the United States by Inner City Records.

== Track listing ==
1. "Between the Devil and the Deep Blue Sea" (Harold Arlen, Ted Koehler) – 5:45
2. "Over the Rainbow" (Arlen, E. Y. Harburg) – 4:20
3. "A Sleepin' Bee" (Arlen, Truman Capote) – 6:04
4. "Ill Wind" (Arlen, Koehler) – 6:35
5. "Out of This World" (Arlen, Johnny Mercer) – 6:30
6. "One for My Baby" (Harold Arlen, Mercer) – 3:12
7. "Get Happy" (Arlen, Koehler) – 5:11
8. "My Shining Hour" (Arlen, Mercer) – 5:15
9. "Last Night When We Were Young" (Arlen, Harburg) – 5:59

== Personnel ==
- Tommy Flanagan – piano
- George Mraz – bass
- Connie Kay – drums
- Helen Merrill – vocals (track 9)
