= Hawkins! Eldridge! Hodges! Alive! At the Village Gate! =

Live album by Coleman Hawkins, Roy Eldridge, Johnny Hodges
- Released: 1962
- Recorded: August 13 and 15, 1962
- Venue: Village Gate, NYC
- Genre: Jazz
- Length: 72:50
- Label: Verve; V/V6 8504
- Producer: Creed Taylor

Coleman Hawkins chronology
The Jazz Version of No Strings (1962)	Hawkins! Eldridge! Hodges! Alive! At the Village Gate! (1962)	Hawkins! Alive! At the Village Gate (1962)

Hawkins! Eldridge! Hodges! Alive! At the Village Gate! is a live album by saxophonists Coleman Hawkins and Johnny Hodges with trumpeter Roy Eldridge which was recorded at the Village Gate in 1962 and released on the Verve label.

== Reception ==
Professional ratings
Review scores
Source	Rating
AllMusic	3/5 stars

AllMusic called it "Timeless music played by some of the top veteran stylists of the swing era".

== Track listing ==
1. "Satin Doll" (Duke Ellington, Billy Strayhorn, Johnny Mercer) – 11:16
2. "Perdido" (Juan Tizol) – 11:36
3. "The Rabbit in Jazz" (Coleman Hawkins, Johnny Hodges) – 16:49
4. "Mack the Knife" (Kurt Weill, Bertolt Brecht) – 8:29 Additional track on CD release
5. "It's the Talk of the Town" (Jerry Livingston, Al J. Neiburg, Marty Symes) – 7:23 Additional track on CD release
6. "Bean and the Boys" (Coleman Hawkins) – 6:58 Additional track on CD release
7. "Caravan' (Ellington, Tizol, Irving Mills) – 10:30 Additional track on CD release

== Personnel ==
- Coleman Hawkins – tenor saxophone
- Roy Eldridge – trumpet (tracks 1–3)
- Johnny Hodges – alto saxophone (tracks 1–3)
- Tommy Flanagan – piano
- Major Holley – bass
- Eddie Locke – drums
