= Trinity (Tommy Flanagan album) =

Studio album by Tommy Flanagan
- Released: 1980
- Recorded: October 4, 18, November 10, 1976
- Genre: Jazz
- Length: 38:36
- Label: Inner City
- Producer: Teo Macero

Tommy Flanagan chronology
The Tommy Flanagan Tokyo Recital (1975)	Trinity (1980)	Eclypso (1977)

Professional ratings
Review scores
Source	Rating
AllMusic	3/5 stars

Trinity is an album by jazz pianist Tommy Flanagan. It is a 1976 trio recording, with bassist Ron Carter and drummer Roy Haynes, that was also released as Positive Intensity.

== Background and recording ==
This album was Flanagan's second as a leader in 15 years, having been vocalist Ella Fitzgerald's pianist for a long period. It was recorded in New York City on October 4, 18, and November 10, 1976.

== Releases ==
Trinity was released by Inner City Records. The same material was also released by CBS/Sony as Positive Intensity.

== Track listing ==
All compositions by Tommy Flanagan except as indicated

1. "52nd Street Theme" (Thelonious Monk) - 3:17
2. "Smooth As the Wind" (Tadd Dameron) - 5:43
3. "Passion Flower" (Billy Strayhorn) - 4:17
4. "Muffin" - 5:43
5. "Verdandi" - 2:47
6. "Ruby, My Dear" (Monk) - 3:52
7. "Bess, You Is My Woman Now" (George Gershwin) - 6:00
8. "Hustle Bustle" - 3:19
9. "Torment" - 3:38

== Personnel ==
- Tommy Flanagan – piano
- Ron Carter – bass
- Roy Haynes – drums
