= Today and Now =

Studio album by Coleman Hawkins
- Released: July/August 1963
- Recorded: September 9 & 11, 1962
- Studios: Van Gelder, Englewood Cliffs, New Jersey
- Genre: Jazz
- Length: 40:01
- Labels: Impulse! A-34
- Producer: Bob Thiele

Coleman Hawkins chronology
Duke Ellington Meets Coleman Hawkins (1962)	Today and Now (1963)	Bluesy Burrell (1962)

Today and Now is an album by American jazz saxophonist Coleman Hawkins featuring performances recorded in 1962 for the Impulse! label.

== Reception ==
The Allmusic review by Steven McDonald awarded the album 4 stars stating "Not always the most compelling title from the Hawkins catalog, the record at least has the virtue of both being listenable and worthy of somewhat deeper inspection".

Professional ratings
Review scores
Source	Rating
Allmusic	4/5 stars
Down Beat	4/5 stars
The Penguin Guide to Jazz Recordings	4/4 stars

== Track listing ==
1. "Go Li'l Liza" (Traditional) – 6:25
2. "Quintessence" (Quincy Jones) – 4:46
3. "Don't Love Me" (Bill Katz, Pauline Rivelli, Ruth Roberts) – 4:40
4. "Love Song from "Apache"" (Johnny Mercer, David Raksin) – 4:14
5. "Put on Your Old Grey Bonnett" (Stanley Murphy, Percy Wenrich) – 9:51
6. "Swingin' Scotch" (Coleman Hawkins) – 5:32
7. "Don't Sit Under the Apple Tree (with Anyone Else but Me)" (Sam H. Stept, Lew Brown, Charles Tobias) – 4:33

Recorded on September 9, 1962 (1–4) and 11, 1962 (5–7).

== Personnel ==
- Coleman Hawkins – tenor saxophone
- Tommy Flanagan – piano
- Major Holley – bass
- Eddie Locke – drums
