= Weaver of Dreams (Kenny Burrell album) =

Studio album by Kenny Burrell
- Released: 1961
- Recorded: October 18, 1960 – June 28, 1961; New York City
- Genre: Jazz
- Length: 34:19
- Label: Columbia; CS 8503
- Producer: John Hammond

Kenny Burrell chronology
A Night at the Vanguard (1959)	Weaver of Dreams (1961)	Bluesin' Around (1961–62)

Weaver of Dreams is an album by guitarist Kenny Burrell recorded in 1960 and 1961 and originally released on the Columbia label. The album features Burrell's vocal talents as well as his guitar playing.

== Reception ==
Professional ratings
Review scores
Source	Rating
Allmusic	3/5 stars

Allmusic awarded the album 3 stars.

== Track listing ==
All compositions by Kenny Burrell except as indicated

1. "I'll Buy You a Star" (Dorothy Fields, Arthur Schwartz) – 2:11
2. "Weaver of Dreams" (Jack Elliott, Victor Young) – 2:28
3. "The More I See You" (Harry Warren, Mack Gordon) – 2:52
4. "I'm Just a Lucky So-and-So" (Duke Ellington, Mack David) – 2:56
5. "A Fine Romance" (Jerome Kern, Dorothy Fields) – 2:04
6. "Until the Real Thing Comes Along" (Mann Holiner, Alberta Nichols, Sammy Cahn, Saul Chaplin, L.E. Freeman) – 3:04
7. "The Blues is Awful Mean" – 2:38
8. "That Old Feeling" (Sammy Fain, Lew Brown) – 3:29
9. "If I Had You" (Jimmy Campbell, Reg Connelly, Ted Shapiro) – 2:08
10. "Hootchie-Koo" – 3:58
11. "Afternoon in Paris" (John Lewis) – 4:19
12. "Like Someone in Love" (Johnny Burke, Jimmy Van Heusen) – 2:12

== Personnel ==
- Kenny Burrell – guitar, vocals
- Bobby Jaspar – tenor saxophone
- Tommy Flanagan – piano
- Joe Benjamin, Wendell Marshall – bass
- Bill English, Bobby Donaldson – drums
