= Back in Bean's Bag =

Studio album by Coleman Hawkins and Clark Terry
- Released: 1963
- Recorded: December 10, 1962
- Studio: NYC
- Genre: Jazz
- Label: Columbia; CL-1991/CS-8791
- Producer: Mike Berniker

Coleman Hawkins chronology
Desafinado (1962)	Back in Bean's Bag (1963)	Sonny Meets Hawk! (1963)

Clark Terry chronology
Clark Terry Plays the Jazz Version of All American (1962)	Back in Bean's Bag (1962)	3 in Jazz (1963)

Back in Bean's Bag is an album by saxophonist Coleman Hawkins with trumpeter Clark Terry which was recorded in late 1962 and released on the Columbia label.

== Reception ==
Professional ratings
Review scores
Source	Rating
AllMusic	3/5 stars
New Record Mirror	4/5 stars

Scott Yanow of AllMusic states, "Hawkins teamed up with the personable trumpeter Clark Terry for this upbeat set of solid swing. Terry in particular is in exuberant form on "Feedin' the Bean" and a delightful version of "Don't Worry About Me", but Hawkins's playing (particularly on the trumpeter's ballad "Michelle") is also in fine form".

== Track listing ==
1. "A Tune for the Tutor" (Pat Patrick) – 6:27
2. "Don't Worry 'bout Me" (Rube Bloom, Ted Koehler) – 3:16
3. "Just Squeeze Me (But Don't Tease Me)" (Duke Ellington, Lee Gaines) – 5:05
4. "Ain't Misbehavin'" (Fats Waller, Harry Brooks, Andy Razaf) – 8:09
5. "Feedin' the Bean" (Count Basie) – 6:18
6. "Michelle" (Clark Terry) – 3:29
7. "Squeeze Me" (Waller, Clarence Williams) – 5:01
8. "Tommy's Blues" (Tommy Flanagan) – 6:32 Additional track on reissue

== Personnel ==
- Coleman Hawkins – tenor saxophone
- Clark Terry – trumpet, flugelhorn
- Tommy Flanagan – piano
- Major Holley – bass
- Dave Bailey – drums
