= Mindelight =

- Origin: Mexico City, Mexico
- Genres: Psytrance
- Years active: 2002–present
- Labels: Phonokol
- Members: Hernan Arber; Javier Calzada

Mindelight is a Mexican psytrance duo, composed of Hernan Arber (Eclypso) and Javier Calzada (Loco). They have played in Mexico, Israel, Australia, France, Germany, along with main trance artists worldwide.

== History ==
=== Origins ===
Hernan Arber was born in Mexico City in 1979. He has been a musician since age four, and studied at the National Conservatory of Music, before becoming a trance musician. Javier Calzada became an electronic musician after becoming a fan of the techno and trance genres, and is currently studying Audio Engineering in Australia. They met at a party in Mexico and after sharing mutual praise for each other, decided to form Mindelight.

== Discography ==
=== Albums ===
- Light the Mind (2006)

=== Compilation albums ===
Year	Title	Track
2003	Psycomex – Mexican Trance Compilation	06. Ludicrous Speed
2004	Waves from Ibiza 1	06. Scratch Delight
2004	El despertar De Las Tribus	01. Nyah
2005	Most Wanted presents Raja Ram – The Godfather	20. La Granga (Raja Ram Godfather Version)
2005	Psytisfaction 3 – The Ultimate Psytisfaction	10. El Guacaloso
