= ...And a Little Pleasure =

1989 album by J. R. Monterose, Tommy Flanagan

Studio album by J. R. Monterose, Tommy Flanagan
- Released: 1981
- Recorded: April 6–7, 1981
- Studio: Right Track Recording, New York City
- Genre: Jazz
- Label: Uptown
- Producer: Mark Feldman, Robert E. Sunenblick, MD

Tommy Flanagan chronology
| You're Me (1980) | ...And a Little Pleasure (1981) | The Magnificent Tommy Flanagan (1981) |

Professional ratings
Review scores
| Source | Rating |
|---|---|
| AllMusic | 3/5 stars |
| The Penguin Guide to Jazz | 3/4 stars |

...And a Little Pleasure is an album by saxophonist J. R. Monterose and pianist Tommy Flanagan. It was recorded and originally released in 1981, and was reissued on CD as A Little Pleasure in 1989.

== Recording and music ==
The album was recorded on April 6 and 7, 1981, in New York City. It was Monterose's recording debut playing the soprano saxophone. The miking was close, so his breathing is clearly audible.

There are two original compositions on the album: "Pain and Suffering...And a Little Pleasure", in 3/4 time, and "Vinnie's Pad". The latter, as well as "Con Alma", are up-tempo performances. "Theme for Ernie", "A Nightingale Sang in Berkeley Square", and others are ballads.

== Releases ==
Uptown Records released the album in 1981. In 1989, Reservoir Records reissued it on CD, with the title A Little Pleasure.

== Track listing ==
1. "Never Let Me Go" (Ray Evans, Jay Livingston) – 7:09
2. "Pain and Suffering...And a Little Pleasure" (J.R. Monterose) – 5:42
3. "Con Alma" (Dizzy Gillespie) – 5:29
4. "Central Park West" (John Coltrane) – 5:01
5. "Theme for Ernie" (Fred Lacey) – 9:05
6. "Vinnie's Pad" (Monterose) – 3:09
7. "A Nightingale Sang in Berkeley Square" (Eric Maschwitz, Manning Sherwin) – 7:29
8. "Twelve Tone Tune" (Bill Evans) – 2:59

== Personnel ==
- J. R. Monterose – tenor and soprano saxophone
- Tommy Flanagan – piano
