= Thelonica =

Studio album by Tommy Flanagan
- Released: 1983
- Recorded: November 30 and December 1, 1982
- Studios: Eurosound, New York City
- Genre: Jazz
- Length: 38:07
- Labels: Enja; 4052
- Producers: Horst Weber, Matthias Winckelmann

Tommy Flanagan chronology
The Magic of 2 (1982)	Thelonica (1983)	I'm All Smiles (1983)

Thelonica is an album by pianist Tommy Flanagan featuring compositions by Thelonious Monk, recorded in 1982 for the Enja label.

== Reception ==
Professional ratings
Review scores
Source	Rating
AllMusic	4.5/5 stars
The Penguin Guide to Jazz Recordings	3/4 stars

AllMusic awarded the album 4½ stars, stating: "Flanagan does not sound at all like Monk but he recaptures his spirit and hints strongly now and then at his style on this fine (and often introspective) outing". The Notes reviewer concluded that "this disc acts as a fitting tribute to the memories of both Monk and Flanagan himself".

== Track listing ==
All compositions by Thelonious Monk except where indicated.

1. "Thelonica" (Tommy Flanagan) – 5:12
2. "Off Minor" – 5:05
3. "Pannonica" – 6:58
4. "North of the Sunset" – 4:36
5. “Ask Me Now” - 4:10
6. "Thelonious" – 4:08
7. "Reflections" – 7:22
8. "Ugly Beauty" – 5:04
9. "Thelonica" (Flanagan) – 5:09

== Personnel ==
- Tommy Flanagan – piano
- George Mraz – bass (tracks 2–7)
- Art Taylor – drums (tracks 2–7)
