= The Jazz Version of No Strings =

Studio album by Coleman Hawkins
- Released: June 1962
- Recorded: March 30 and April 3, 1962
- Studio: Van Gelder, Englewood Cliffs, New Jersey
- Genre: Jazz
- Length: 36:29
- Label: Moodsville; MV 25
- Producer: Esmond Edwards

Coleman Hawkins chronology
Good Old Broadway (1962)	The Jazz Version of No Strings (1962)	Hawkins! Eldridge! Hodges! Alive! At the Village Gate! (1962)

The Jazz Version of No Strings (complete title The Coleman Hawkins Quartet Play The Jazz Version of No Strings) is an album by saxophonist Coleman Hawkins featuring tracks from the musical drama No Strings written by Richard Rodgers, which was recorded in 1962 and released on the Moodsville label.

Professional ratings
Review scores
Source	Rating
Allmusic	3/5 stars

Allmusic awarded the album 3 stars.

== Track listing ==
All compositions by Richard Rodgers

1. "Look No Further" - 4:28
2. "La La La" - 3:18
3. "Nobody Told Me" - 3:20
4. "Maine" - 3:11
5. "Loads of Love" - 4:10
6. "The Sweetest Sounds" - 4:17
7. "Be My Host" - 3:03
8. "The Man Who Has Everything" - 5:56
9. "No Strings" - 4:44

== Personnel ==
- Coleman Hawkins - tenor saxophone
- Tommy Flanagan - piano
- Major Holley - bass
- Eddie Locke - drums
