= Blues in the Closet (Tommy Flanagan album) =

Studio album by Tommy Flanagan, Ron Carter and Tony Williams
- Released: 1984
- Recorded: June 16–17, 1983
- Studio: A&R, New York City
- Genre: Jazz
- Label: Baybridge
- Producer: Kiyoshi Koyama

Tommy Flanagan chronology
The Master Trio (1983)	Blues in the Closet (1984)	Nights at the Vanguard (1986)

Professional ratings
Review scores
Source	Rating
AllMusic	3/5 stars

Blues in the Closet is a 1983 album by jazz pianist Tommy Flanagan, bassist Ron Carter and drummer Tony Williams, known collectively as the Master Trio.

== Background ==
Pianist Tommy Flanagan and bassist Ron Carter had recorded together numerous times since 1960. In contrast, this recording session (which also resulted in the album The Master Trio) was Flanagan's only recording with drummer Tony Williams.

== Recording and music ==
The album was recorded on June 16 and 17, 1983, at A&R Recording Studio in New York City. The material includes blues, ballads, and bebop compositions. "Sister Cheryl" is a Williams composition.

== Release ==
The album was released in Japan by Baybridge.

== Track listing ==
1. "Good Bait" (Tadd Dameron, Count Basie)
2. "Afternoon in Paris" (John Lewis)
3. "Giant Steps" (John Coltrane)
4. "Blues in the Closet" (Oscar Pettiford)
5. "Sister Cheryl" (Tony Williams)
6. "My Ship" (Kurt Weill, Ira Gershwin)
7. "Moose the Mooche" (Charlie Parker)

== Personnel ==
- Tommy Flanagan – piano
- Ron Carter – bass
- Tony Williams – drums
