= Eclypso (album) =

Studio album by Tommy Flanagan, George Mraz and Elvin Jones
- Released: 1980
- Recorded: February 4, 1977
- Studio: Sound Ideas, New York City
- Genre: Jazz
- Length: 42:22
- Label: Enja; 2088
- Producer: Horst Weber, Matthias Winckelmann

Tommy Flanagan chronology
Trinity (1976)	Eclypso (1980)	Montreux '77 (1977)

Eclypso is an album by pianist Tommy Flanagan, bassist George Mraz, and drummer Elvin Jones, recorded in 1977 for the Enja label.

== Reception ==
Professional ratings
Review scores
Source	Rating
AllMusic	3/5 stars
The Penguin Guide to Jazz	3/4 stars

AllMusic awarded the album 3 stars, with Ron Wynn calling it an "exceptional late '70s trio date, with pianist Tommy Flanagan displaying the hard bop proficiency that's been taken for granted" and stating, "His lines, phrasing, and creative solos, plus his interaction with bassist George Mraz and drummer Elvin Jones, won the album rave reviews".

== Track listing ==
1. "Oleo" (Sonny Rollins) – 4:11
2. "Denzil's Best" (Denzil Best) – 5:31
3. "A Blue Time" (Tadd Dameron) – 6:14
4. "Relaxin' at Camarillo" (Charlie Parker) – 4:36
5. "Cup Bearers" (Tom McIntosh) – 3:48
6. "Eclypso" (Tommy Flanagan) – 12:28
7. "Confirmation" (Charlie Parker) – 6:07

== Personnel ==
- Tommy Flanagan – piano
- George Mraz – bass
- Elvin Jones – drums
