= Coleman Hawkins =

American jazz saxophonist (1904–1969)

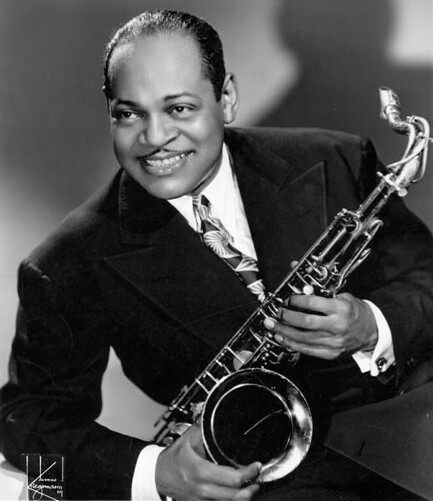
- Hawkins c. 1945

Background information
- Also known as: "Bean", "Hawk"
- Born: Coleman Randolph Hawkins; November 21, 1904; St. Joseph, Missouri, U.S.
- Died: May 19, 1969 (aged 64) New York City, U.S.
- Genres: Jazz; swing; bebop
- Occupations: Musician; bandleader
- Instruments: Tenor saxophone; bass saxophone; clarinet
- Years active: 1921–1969

Coleman Randolph Hawkins (November 21, 1904 – May 19, 1969), nicknamed "Hawk" and sometimes "Bean", was an American jazz tenor saxophonist. He was one of the first prominent jazz musicians on his instrument, as Joachim-Ernst Berendt explained: "There were some tenor players before him, but the instrument was not an acknowledged jazz horn." Hawkins biographer John Chilton described the prevalent styles of tenor saxophone solos prior to Hawkins as "mooing" and "rubbery belches". Hawkins denied being first and noted his contemporaries Happy Caldwell, Stump Evans, and Prince Robinson, although he was the first to tailor his method of improvisation to the saxophone rather than imitate the techniques of the clarinet. Hawkins's virtuosic, arpeggiated approach to improvisation, with his characteristic rich, emotional, and vibrato-laden tonal style, was the main influence on a generation of tenor players that included Chu Berry, Charlie Barnet, Tex Beneke, Ben Webster, Vido Musso, Herschel Evans, Buddy Tate, and Don Byas, and through them the later tenormen Arnett Cobb, Illinois Jacquet, Flip Phillips, Ike Quebec, Al Sears, Paul Gonsalves, and Lucky Thompson. While Hawkins became known with swing music during the big band era, he had a role in the development of bebop in the 1940s.

Fellow saxophonist Lester Young, known as the "President of the Tenor Saxophone", commented, in a 1959 interview with The Jazz Review, "As far as I'm concerned, I think Coleman Hawkins was the president, first, right? As far as myself, I think I'm the second one." Miles Davis once said, "When I heard Hawk, I learned to play ballads."

== Early life ==
Hawkins was born in St. Joseph, Missouri, U.S., in 1904. He was named Coleman after his mother Cordelia's maiden name. There is record of Hawkins's parents' first child, a girl, being born in 1901 and dying at the age of two. At the age of four, Hawkins began to study the piano, then the cello when he was seven, before switching to the saxophone by the age of nine. By the time he was fourteen, he was playing around eastern Kansas. He attended high school in Chicago, then in Topeka, Kansas, at Topeka High School. He later stated that he studied harmony and composition for two years at Washburn College in Topeka while still attending high school.

The origin of Hawkins's nickname, "Bean", is not clear. Theories around the nickname's basis include a reference to Hawkins's head shape, his frugality (saying "I haven't a bean") or due to his immense knowledge of chords.

== Later life and career ==
=== 1921–1939 ===
Hawkins playing "I wish I Were Twins" in 1935

Hawkins's first significant gig was with Mamie Smith's Jazz Hounds in 1921, and he was with the band full-time from April 1922 to 1923, when he settled in New York City. In the Jazz Hounds, he coincided with Garvin Bushell, Everett Robbins, Bubber Miley, and Herb Flemming. Hawkins joined Fletcher Henderson's Orchestra, where he remained until 1934, sometimes doubling on clarinet and bass saxophone. Hawkins's playing changed significantly during Louis Armstrong's tenure with the Henderson Orchestra (1924–25). In the late 1920s, Hawkins participated in some of the earliest integrated recording sessions with the Mound City Blue Blowers. During his time with Henderson, he became a star soloist with increasing prominence on records. While with the band, he and Henry "Red" Allen recorded a series of small group sides for ARC (on their Perfect, Melotone, Romeo, and Oriole labels). Hawkins also recorded a number of solo recordings with either piano or a pick-up band of Henderson's musicians in 1933–34, just prior to his period in Europe. He was also featured on a Benny Goodman session on February 2, 1934, for Columbia, which also featured Mildred Bailey as guest vocalist.

In late 1934, Hawkins accepted an invitation to play with Jack Hylton's orchestra in London, and toured Europe as a soloist until 1939, performing and recording with Django Reinhardt and Benny Carter in Paris in 1937. During Hawkins's time touring Europe between 1934 and 1939, attention in the U.S. shifted to other tenor saxophonists, including Lester Young, Ben Webster, and Chu Berry. Following his return to the United States, he quickly re-established himself as one of the leading figures on the instrument by adding innovations to his earlier style.

On October 11, 1939, he recorded a two-chorus performance of the standard "Body and Soul", which he had been performing at Bert Kelly's New York venue, Kelly's Stables. In a landmark recording of the swing era, captured as an afterthought at the session, Hawkins ignores almost all of the melody, with only the first four bars stated in a recognizable fashion. Hawkins's departure from the melodic themes of the tune, use of upper chord intervals, and implied passing chords in that recording have been described as "one of the early tremors of bebop".

Loren Schoenberg, Director of the National Jazz Museum in Harlem, stated:

"No matter how nonchalantly Hawkins tried to make the choice to record 'Body and Soul' seem, it had long been his encore during his European years, and he had a lot riding on this session. Lester Young was at his zenith with the Basie band, and virtually all of the other major bands had a Hawkins-styled tenor in a featured position. The decades as a musical omnivore came to fruition as he signaled to pianist Gene Rodgers to make an introduction in D♭. The sounds of Bach, Tatum, Armstrong, and the untold musicians who had filled his head and ears culminated in one of the greatest spontaneous set of variations ever recorded".

=== The 1940s and 1950s ===
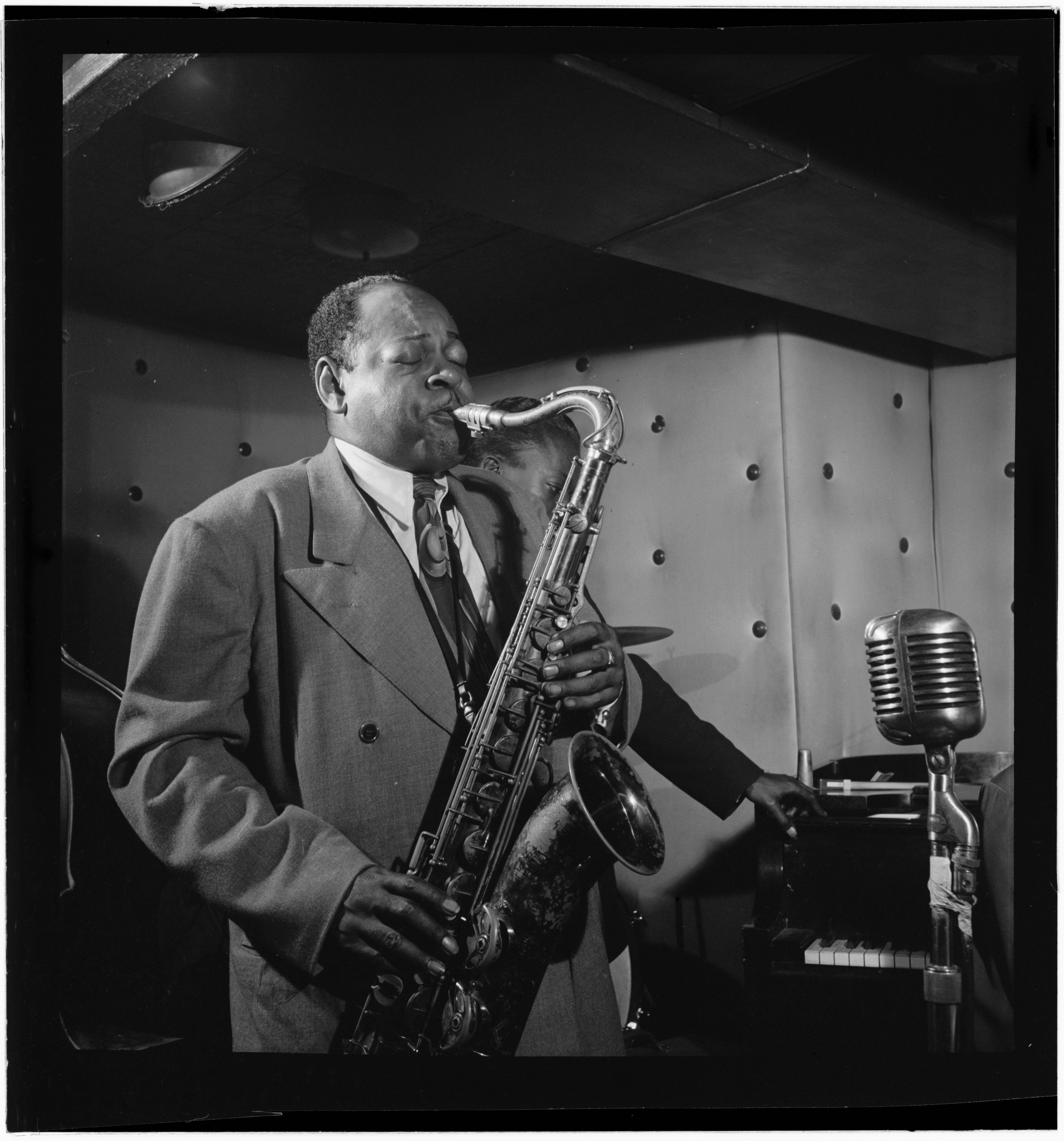
Coleman Hawkins, c. September 1946

After a brief period in 1940 leading a big band, Hawkins led small groups at Kelly's Stables on 52nd Street in Manhattan. During 1944, he recorded in small and large groups for the Keynote, Savoy, and Apollo labels. Hawkins always had a keen ear for new talent and styles, and he was the leader on what is generally considered to have been the first ever bebop recording session, on February 16, 1944, including Dizzy Gillespie, Don Byas, Clyde Hart, Oscar Pettiford, and Max Roach. On October 19, 1944, he led another bebop recording session with Thelonious Monk on piano, Edward Robinson on bass, and Denzil Best on drums.

Given his love of Bach and Pablo Casals and his own unquenchable thirst for self-expression, it was inevitable that Hawkins would move towards solo performances. During his European tour, he began surrounding his songs with unaccompanied introductions and codas. In January 1945, he recorded Solo Sessions. Harry Lim – a Javanese jazz lover who came to the United States in 1939, first produced jam sessions in Chicago and New York, and then founded Keynote Records, a premier, small jazz label – wrote in an article for Metronome magazine in May 1944 that Hawkins was "the Picasso of Jazz".

In 1945, he recorded extensively with small groups with Best and either Robinson or Pettiford on bass, Charles Thompson on piano, Allan Reuss on guitar, Howard McGhee on trumpet, and Vic Dickenson on trombone, in sessions reflecting a highly individual style with an indifference toward the categories of "modern" and "traditional" jazz. That general period saw him recording with such diverse stylists as Sid Catlett, Tyree Glenn, Hilton Jefferson (a Fletcher Henderson colleague), Hank Jones, Billy Taylor, J. J. Johnson, and Fats Navarro. He also toured with Jazz at the Philharmonic (JATP). Hawkins divided his time between New York and Europe, making numerous freelance recordings.

In the 1950s, Hawkins performed with musicians such as Red Allen and Roy Eldridge, with whom he appeared at the 1957 Newport Jazz Festival, and recorded Coleman Hawkins Encounters Ben Webster with fellow tenor saxophonist Ben Webster along with Oscar Peterson, Herb Ellis, Ray Brown, and Alvin Stoller. His 1957 album The Hawk Flies High, with Idrees Sulieman, J. J. Johnson, Hank Jones, Barry Galbraith, Oscar Pettiford, and Jo Jones, shows his interest in modern jazz styles, during a period better known for his playing with more traditional musicians.

Hawkins's interest in more modern styles manifested in a reunion with Monk, with whom he had remained close even though they had not played together for over a decade. Monk led a June 1957 session featuring Hawkins and John Coltrane that yielded Monk's Music, issued later that summer. Outtakes from this session comprised half of the tracks on Thelonious Monk with John Coltrane, released on the Jazzland subsidiary of Riverside Records in 1961.

=== 1960–1969 ===
In the 1960s, Hawkins appeared regularly at the Village Vanguard in Manhattan. In 1960, he participated in the recording of Max Roach's We Insist! suite, part of the political and social linkages developing between jazz and the civil rights movement. At the behest of Impulse! Records producer Bob Thiele, Hawkins availed himself of a long-desired opportunity to record with Duke Ellington for the 1962 album Duke Ellington Meets Coleman Hawkins, alongside Ellington band members Johnny Hodges, Lawrence Brown, Ray Nance, and Harry Carney. Sessions for Impulse! with his performing quartet yielded Today and Now, also in 1962, and judged one of his better latter-day efforts by The Penguin Guide to Jazz Recordings. Hawkins recorded in 1963 alongside Sonny Rollins for their collaborative album Sonny Meets Hawk!, for RCA Victor.

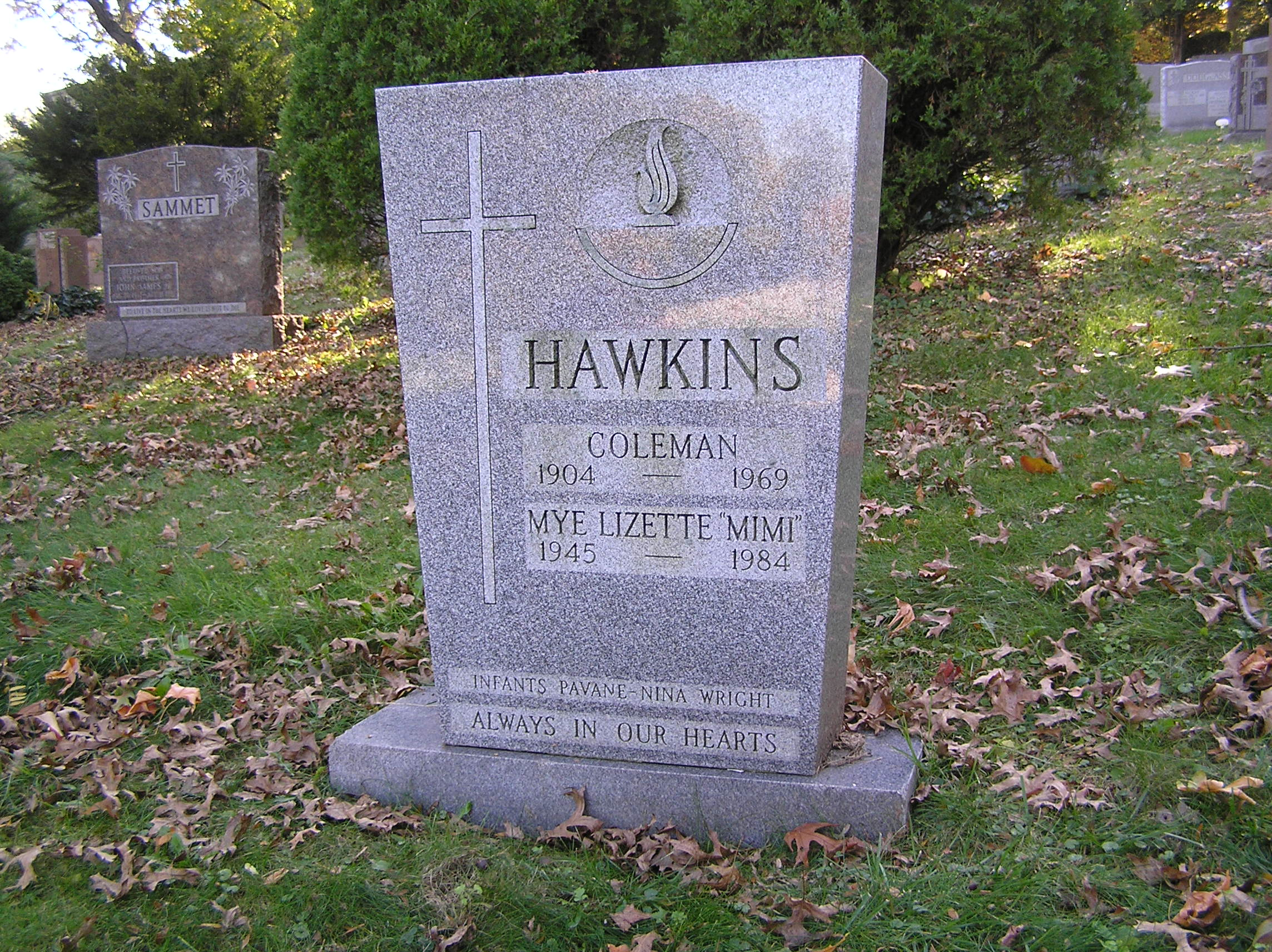
The grave of Coleman Hawkins

It was shortly after this busy period that Hawkins fell into the grip of depression and heavy drinking and his recording output began to wane. His last recording was in 1967; Hawkins died of liver disease on May 19, 1969, at Wickersham Hospital, in Manhattan. He was survived by his widow, Dolores, who died in 2010, and by three children: a son, Rene, and two daughters, Colette and Mimi. Hawkins is interred in the Yew Plot at the Woodlawn Cemetery in the Bronx, New York City.

The Song of the Hawk, a 1990 biography written by British jazz historian John Chilton, chronicles Hawkins's career.

== Discography ==
=== As leader/co-leader ===
- 1922–47: Classic Coleman Hawkins Sessions 1922-1947 (8xCD) (Mosaic, 2012) Contains many of the first Hawkins sides with Mamie Smith & Her Jazz Hounds, the Fletcher Henderson Orchestra with Hawkins solos, and many others under his own name.
- 1929–41: The Complete Recordings (6xCD) (Affinity, 1992)
- 1944: Rainbow Mist (Delmark, 1992) Apollo recordings
- 1944: The Complete on Keynote (Essential Collection #6) (4xCD) (Mercury, 1986)
- 1945: Hollywood Stampede (Capitol, LP: 1972, CD: 1989)
- 1949–53: Bean's Talking Again (Vogue, 1970)
- 1952: Disorder at the Border (Spotlite, 1973)
- 1952–53: The Hawk Talks (Decca, 1955)
- 1954: The Hawk Returns (Savoy, 1954)
- 1954: Timeless Jazz (Jazztone, 1954) reissued as Jazz Tones (Xanadu, 1984)
- 1955: Accent on Tenor Sax (Urania, 1955)
- 1956.01: The Hawk in Hi Fi (RCA Victor, 1956) with Billy Byers and his orchestra
- 1956.07: The Hawk in Paris (Vik, 1956) with Manny Albam and his orchestra
- 1956-57: The Gilded Hawk (Capitol, 1957) with Glen Osser and his orchestra
- 1957.03: The Hawk Flies High (Riverside, 1957)
- 1957.07: The Coleman Hawkins, Roy Eldridge, Pete Brown, Jo Jones All Stars at Newport (Verve, 1957)
- 1957.10: Coleman Hawkins Encounters Ben Webster (Verve, 1957)
- 1957.10: The Genius of Coleman Hawkins (Verve, 1957)
- 1957.10: Coleman Hawkins and Roy Eldridge, At The Opera House (Verve, 1957)
- 1957.10: Coleman Hawkins and Ben Webster, Blue Saxophones (Verve, 1959)
- 1958.02: Coleman Hawkins and Confrères (Verve, 1958) with the Oscar Peterson Trio, Roy Eldridge, Ben Webster
- 1958.02: The High and Mighty Hawk (Felsted, 1958)
- 1958.04: Jamestown N.Y. 1958 (Uptown, 1998)
- 1958.04: The Saxophone Section (World Wide, 1958)
- 1958.08: Sweet Moods of Jazz (Jazz Groove, 19??) reissued as High Standards (Jass, 1987), and in CD as Standards and Warhorses (with the addition of a Red Allen album)
- 1958.09: Bean Bags (Atlantic, 1958) with Milt Jackson
- 1958.11: Soul (Prestige, 1958) with Kenny Burrell
- 1959.01: At The Bayou Club, Vol. 1 & 2 (Nec Plus Ultra, 1983) with Roy Eldridge; reissued by Stash with the same title
- 1959.04: Hawk Eyes (Prestige, 1959) with Charlie Shavers and Tiny Grimes
- 1959.08: Coleman Hawkins with the Red Garland Trio (Moodsville, 1959)
- 1960.01: Coleman Hawkins All Stars (Swingville, 1960) with Joe Thomas and Vic Dickenson
- 1960.01: At Ease with Coleman Hawkins (Moodsville, 1960)
- 1960.01: The Hawk Swings (Crown, 1960) reissued in CD with the same title (Boplicity, 2013)
- 1960.01: Coleman Hawkins and His Orchestra (Crown, 1960) reissued in CD with same title (Pure Pleasure, 2005)
- 1960.04: Hawk in Germany (Debut, 1963) with Bud Powell; reissued by Fantasy
- 1960.10: Bean Stalkin' (Pablo, 1988)
- 1960.12: Night Hawk (Swingville, 1960) with Eddie "Lockjaw" Davis
- 1961.02: The Hawk Relaxes (Moodsville, 1961)
- 1961.07: Body And Soul (West Wind, 1988)
- 1960.04: Pee Wee Russell and Coleman Hawkins, Jazz Reunion (Candid, 1961)
- 1962.03: Good Old Broadway (Moodsville 1962)
- 1962.03: The Jazz Version of No Strings (Moodsville, 1962)
- 1962.06: Disorder At The Border (Milan, 1989)
- 1962.08: Hawkins! Eldridge! Hodges! Alive! At the Village Gate! (Verve, 1962)
- 1962.08: Hawkins! Alive! At the Village Gate (Verve, 1962)
- 1962.08: Duke Ellington Meets Coleman Hawkins (Impulse!, 1963)
- 1962.08: Plays Make Someone Happy from Do Re Mi (Moodsville, 1962)
- 1962.09: Today and Now (Impulse!, 1962)
- 1962.09: Desafinado (Impulse!, 1962)
- 1962.12: Back in Bean's Bag (Columbia, 1963) with Clark Terry
- 1963.03: The Hawk & the Hunter (Mira, 1965)
- 1963.07: Sonny Meets Hawk! (RCA Victor, 1963) with Sonny Rollins
- 1965.02: Wrapped Tight (Impulse!, 1965)
- 1966.12: Sirius (Pablo, 1975)

=== Anthologies ===
- 1927–1956: The Indispensable Coleman Hawkins "Body And Soul" (RCA, 1984)
- 1939–1956: Body & Soul (RCA, LP: 1976, CD: 1996)
- 1958–1962: The Best of Coleman Hawkins (Original Jazz Classics, 2004)

=== As sideman ===
==== With various artists ====
- 1961.04: Things Ain't What They Used to Be (Swingville 2024, 1961) as part of the 'Prestige Swing Festival' double album
- 1961.05: Years Ago (Swingville 2025, 1961) as part of the 'Prestige Swing Festival' double album
- 1967.03: The Greatest Jazz Concert in the World (Pablo, 1975)

With Kenny Burrell

- Bluesy Burrell (Moodsville, 1962)

With Benny Carter

- Further Definitions (Impulse!, 1961)

With Buck Clayton

- Jumpin' at the Woodside (Columbia, 1955)
- All the Cats Join In (Columbia 1956)

With Eddie "Lockjaw" Davis

- Very Saxy (Prestige, 1959)

With Dizzy Gillespie

- The Complete RCA Victor Recordings (Bluebird, 1937–1949 [1995])

With Tiny Grimes

- Blues Groove (Prestige, 1958)

With Fletcher Henderson

- A Study in Frustration: The Fletcher Henderson Story (Columbia, 1923–1938 [1961])
- The Complete Fletcher Henderson 1927–1936 (RCA, 1976)

With Lambert, Hendricks & Bavan

- At Newport '63 (RCA Victor, 1963)

With Abbey Lincoln

- Straight Ahead (Candid, 1961)

With Shelly Manne

- 2-3-4 (Impulse!, 1962)

With Thelonious Monk

- Monk's Music (1957)
- Thelonious Monk with John Coltrane (Riverside, 1957)

With Bud Powell

- The Essen Jazz Festival Concert (1960)

With Bob Prince

- Saxes Inc. (1959)

With Django Reinhardt

- And His American Friends (various labels, ca. 1935–1937)
- Django Reinhardt Collection (Fabulous, 1935–1946 [2014])

With Max Roach

- We Insist! (Candid, 1960)

With Rex Stewart and Cootie Williams

- The Big Challenge (Jazztone, 1957)

With Ben Webster

- Ben Webster and Associates (Verve, 1959)

With Randy Weston

- Live at the Five Spot (United Artists, 1959)

With Joe Williams

- At Newport '63 (RCA Victor, 1963)

== See also ==
- List of people from Harlem
