= Billy Stritch =

American composer, arranger, vocalist, and jazz pianist (born 1962)

- Born: February 12, 1962 (age 64); Houston, Texas, U.S.
- Education: University of Houston
- Known for: Liza Minnelli confidant

Billy Stritch (born February 12, 1962) is an American composer, arranger, vocalist, and jazz pianist. For many years he was best known as a confidant, music director, and piano player for Liza Minnelli.

== Early life and career ==
Stritch was born on February 12, 1962, in Houston and grew up in Sugar Land, Texas. At 8 or 9, he heard big band music for the first time. In 1979, he graduated from Dulles High School in Sugar Land which had a "great" music education program; he played in the school's jazz band. He played in a jazz vocal trio while at the University of Houston. The trio played jazz festivals for nine years. The trio broke up and Stritch moved to New York City. Stritch met singer Marilyn Maye about 1980, while she was playing a club in Houston. Since then, he has worked as her frequent accompanist and music director. He recorded his first album in 1992, the self-styled jazz LP, Billy Stritch.

Stritch and Sandy Knox composed the 1994 Grammy Award-winning country song, "Does He Love You," which was recorded by Reba McEntire and Linda Davis. The song, about a love triangle, follows a common trope. It peaked as a number one country music hit in both the United States and Canada ending 1993 as the 52nd biggest hit in Canada, and in the top 40 in the United States. The single won the Grammy award for Best Country Vocal Collaboration, and although nominated, Stritch lost the best song Grammy to Mary Chapin Carpenter for "Passionate Kisses." Stritch and Knox had written the song when they were part of the trio back in 1982, but until McEntire "grabbed it ... in 1993" and made a surprise hit with it, nobody had recorded the ballad. Even Wynonna Judd rejected it because she "didn't like to sing songs about marital problems." In 1996, Minnelli released the song as a duet with Donna Summer, from Minnelli's album, "Gently". In 1997, it appeared on Patti LaBelle's album, Flame.

== Collaboration with Liza Minnelli ==
For 23 years, Stritch was associated with Liza Minnelli, as her "confidant", music director, and piano player. They met when Stritch was playing piano in Manhattan, in March 1991. That night seeing her, he played musical themes from films of Vincente Minnelli, her father, and they hit it off immediately. He arranged the music for her show at Radio City Music Hall and opened her act on a national tour of the U.S. In 1999, he arranged music for Liza Minnelli's Broadway one-woman show Minnelli on Minnelli: Live at the Palace, and performed with her in 2008's Liza's at the Palace. Stritch co-wrote, with Brian Lane Green, I Would Never Leave You for Liza's at the Palace..., a Johnny Rodgers song which was produced by Phil Ramone.

In 2008, Minnelli praised Stritch for their long collaboration on her Facebook page. They performed together for the 2009 grand re-opening of the Guildhall in Easthampton, Long Island. Stritch joked that he couldn't afford a "cottage" in the Hamptons.

== Later career ==
In 2001, he performed as Oscar in the 2001 Broadway revival of 42nd Street. In the same year he released his third major disc, Jazz Live on Sin-Drome Records, receiving excellent reviews. At that time, he first met Christine Ebersole, who was also in the cast. Stritch performed in a 2003 concert of Amanda Green's original revue Put a Little Love in Your Mouth!, at off-Broadway's Second Stage Theater in March 2003, which also featured Jessica Molaskey and Mario Cantone. On most Monday nights since 2003 Stritch provides piano accompaniment for the open mic smorgasbord which is known as "Cast Party," hosted by his long-time friend Jim Caruso at Birdland, a Manhattan jazz club.

In 2006, he developed a new show to serve as a tribute to his idol, Mel Tormé, opening at New York's Metropolitan Club. The New York Times reviewer wrote that "Mr. Stritch, who even looks a bit like his idol, exudes a similarly cultivated bonhomie. But he has a bigger, rougher voice." Stritch has taken the show nationally, beginning in 2007 and going until at least 2013.

For Christmas 2006 he played at the Iridium in New York with guest performers Liza Minnelli, Lainie Kazan, Ann Hampton Callaway, and Sally Mayes. His recording of Dreaming of a Song: The Music of Hoagy Carmichael with Klea Blackhurst was released in October 2008. He has performed frequently with Linda Lavin, touring nationally with her in 2017 and 2018. He has also performed with duets with Christine Ebersole; Variety said he punctuated "the lady's repertoire with vigorous piano and vocal support."

He performed at a benefit for Broadway Cares with Luann de Lesseps, of the reality television show, The Real Housewives of New York City, whom she called among "the best in the business." In 2013, Stritch joined Jim Caruso in a cabaret show in New York. Rex Reed wrote about the show saying "Every Sunday in December, when the Café Carlyle across the hall is dark, the glamorous Bemelmans Bar is hosting the most enchanting holiday party in town."

Stritch returned to his home town for a gig in 2014, where the Sugar Land Auditorium was renamed the "Billy Stritch Stage" in his honor. In 2015, Stritch toured the U.S. and Canada with Caruso for their show, "The Sinatra Century." He headlined at the 2016 Provincetown Jazz Festival on Cape Cod. In 2019, he performed with Marilyn Maye at the Cotuit Center for the Arts in Cotuit, one of the villages of Barnstable, Massachusetts on Cape Cod.

== Select discography and works ==
- "The Sunday Set: Recorded Live at The Birdland Theatre" with Jim Caruso (2022)
- "Billy's Place" (2020)
- "Christmas at Birdland" with Jim Caruso and Klea Blackhurst (2019)
- "A Swinging Birdland Christmas" with Jim Caruso and Klea Blackhurst (2016)
- "Billy Stritch Sings Mel Tormè" (2012)
- "Dreaming of a Song: the Music of Hoagy Carmichael " with Klea Blackhurst (2008)
- "Sunday in New York" with Christine Ebersole (2008)
- "Billy Stritch -- Jazz Live" (2006)
- "In Your Dreams" with Christine Ebersole (2005)
- "Waters of March -- The Brazilian Album" (1997)
- "Billy Stritch" (1992)
- "The Life"
- "Sondheim - a Celebration at Carnegie Hall"
- "Jim Caruso: Live and In Person"
- Guest artist on Benny Carter's Benny Carter Songbook (1996) and Benny Carter Songbook Volume II (MusicMasters 65134-2 1997)
- Schechter, Scott and Stritch, Billy (2004). The Liza Minnelli Scrapbook. Citadel. ISBN 9780806526119
