= Songbook (Benny Carter album) =

Studio album by Benny Carter
- Released: 1996
- Recorded: June 26 – August 26, 1995
- Studio: Group IV Studios, Los Angeles; Master Sound Astoria, New York City
- Genre: Jazz
- Length: 77:09
- Label: MusicMasters
- Producer: Danny Kapilian; Ed Berger

Benny Carter chronology
| Elegy in Blue (1994) | Songbook (1996) | Another Time, Another Place (1996) |

Songbook is an album by American saxophonist and composer Benny Carter, released in 1996 by MusicMasters Records.

== Reception ==
Professional ratings
Review scores
| Source | Rating |
|---|---|
| AllMusic | 4.5/5 stars |

AllMusic reviewer Scott Yanow stated "Due to his being such a talented altoist, arranger and occasional trumpeter for seven decades, it is often forgotten that Benny Carter wrote some worthy songs along the way ... The ambitious program includes five Carter songs that were receiving their world premiere; in addition Carter also wrote or co-wrote the lyrics to nine of the pieces. The singers all show respect for the melody and words ... The vocalists consistently seem quite inspired by the unique project. There are many short Carter and Warren Vache solos and, even with the emphasis on ballads, there is more variety than one might expect. The well-conceived tribute is easily recommended".

== Track listing ==
All compositions by Benny Carter, except where noted.

1. "Only Trust Your Heart" (Benny Carter, Sammy Cahn) – 5:28
2. "All That Jazz" (Carter, Al Stillman) – 4:53
3. "I Was Wrong" – 4:21
4. "Rain" – 4:58
5. "Cow-Cow Boogie" (Don Raye, Carter, Gene de Paul) – 5:32
6. "Fresh Out of Love" – 5:37
7. "Speak Now" – 4:54
8. "A Kiss from You" (Carter, Johnny Mercer) – 5:27
9. "You Bring Out the Best in Me" – 4:15
10. "My Kind of Trouble Is You" (Carter, Paul Vandervoort II) – 5:46
11. "When Lights Are Low" (Carter, Spencer Williams) – 4:05
12. "Lonely Woman" (Carter, Ray Sonin) – 6:33
13. "Key Largo" (Carter, Karl Suessdorf, Leah Worth) – 4:32
14. "We Were in Love" – 6:00
15. "I See You" – 4:48

== Personnel ==
- Benny Carter – alto saxophone
- Warren Vaché – cornet (tracks 1–3, 5–7, 9, 11, 13 & 14)
- Chris Neville – piano (tracks 1–14)
- Steve LaSpina – bass (tracks 1–14)
- Sherman Ferguson – drums (tracks 1, 3–9, 11, 12, 14 & 15)

=== Guests ===
- Dianne Reeves (tracks 1 & 14), Carmen Bradford (tracks 2 & 13), Kenny Rankin (track 2), Joe Williams (tracks 3 & 14), Marlena Shaw (track 4), Jon Hendricks (track 5), Diana Krall (track 6), Billy Stritch (track 7), Shirley Horn (track 8), Bobby Short, (track 9), Ruth Brown (track 10), Weslia Whitfield (track 11), Nancy Marano (track 12), Peggy Lee (track 15) – vocals
- Gene DiNovi – piano (track 15)
- John Heard – bass (track 15)
- Roy McCurdy – drums (tracks 2, 10 & 13)
