= New York Nights (album) =

Live album by Benny Carter
- Released: 1997
- Recorded: June 22 & 24, 1995
- Venue: Iridium Jazz Club, New York City, NY
- Genre: Jazz
- Length: 66:04
- Label: MusicMasters; 65154-2
- Producer: Ed Berger

Benny Carter chronology
| Another Time, Another Place (1996) | New York Nights (1997) | Benny Carter Songbook Volume II (1997) |

New York Nights is a live album by saxophonist/composer Benny Carter recorded at the Iridium in 1995 and released by the MusicMasters label in 1997.

== Reception ==
Professional ratings
Review scores
| Source | Rating |
|---|---|
| AllMusic | 4/5 stars |

AllMusic reviewer Scott Yanow stated "To say that Benny Carter is a marvel is to make an obvious understatement. 87 at the time of this live quartet set Carter could easily pass for 47, playing without any hesitant or faltering moments in a timeless swing style that he largely invented. There are no surprises to the repertoire ... No matter; Benny Carter comes up with fresh variations during his enthusiastic solos ... His logical and thoughtful improvisations manage to be unpredictable, except in their consistent excellence. An easily recommended set from an apparently ageless master". In JazzTimes Bill Bennett wrote "At 88, Benny Carter still had it: that’s the inescapable conclusion to be drawn from this recital, recorded in June, 1995, at Iridium in New York. “It” in this context is one of the most distinctive and distinguished alto sax voices in the history of jazz, built on phrasing of genuine inspiration. Ranging from a legato that ranks with Johnny Hodges’ as one of the most beautiful sounds in Western music, to a clipped staccato that brings the architecture of a melody into warm relief, Carter builds his solos with a grand conception that defies most composers, let alone improvisers"

== Track listing ==
1. "What Is This Thing Called Love?" (Cole Porter) – 6:56
2. "Easy Money" (Benny Carter) – 8:44
3. "The Shadow of Your Smile" (Johnny Mandel, Paul Francis Webster) – 6:38
4. "Secret Love" (Sammy Fain, Webster) – 8:47
5. "When Lights Are Low" (Carter, Spencer Williams) – 5:23
6. "On Green Dolphin Street" (Bronisław Kaper, Ned Washington) – 7:45
7. "But Beautiful" (Jimmy Van Heusen, Johnny Burke) – 7:00
8. "Just in Time" (Jule Styne, Betty Comden, Adolph Green) – 6:54
9. "Perdido" (Juan Tizol, Ervin Drake, Hans Lengsfelder) – 7:57

== Personnel ==
- Benny Carter – alto saxophone
- Chris Neville – piano
- Steve LaSpina – bass
- Sherman Ferguson – drums
