= Songbook Volume II =

Studio album by Benny Carter
- Released: 1997
- Recorded: June 26 – July 28, 1995
- Studio: Group IV Studios, Los Angeles; Master Sound Astoria, New York City
- Genre: Jazz
- Length: 75:22
- Label: MusicMasters
- Producer: Danny Kapilian; Ed Berger

Benny Carter chronology
| New York Nights (1997) | Songbook Volume II (1997) |

Songbook Volume II is an album by American saxophonist and composer Benny Carter, released in 1997 by MusicMasters Records.

== Reception ==
Professional ratings
Review scores
| Source | Rating |
|---|---|
| AllMusic | 3/5 stars |

AllMusic reviewer Ken Dryden stated, "The 1997 release of this CD helped Benny Carter celebrate his 90th birthday, featuring 14 of his original ballads by a dozen guests, in addition to a warm tribute to his wife of many years, 'When Hilma Smiles,' sung by Carter himself in a friendly, unpretentious manner. His smooth alto sax hasn't lost anything over the decades, and the top-notch cornet of Warren Vaché is also a nice touch".

== Track listing ==
All compositions by Benny Carter, except where noted.

1. "My Mind Is Still On You" (Benny Carter, John Moen, Leonard Feather) – 3:22
2. "Echo of My Dream" – 5:07
3. "Rock Me to Sleep" (Carter, Paul Vandervoort II) – 5:58
4. "Stop Me Before I Fall in Love Again" – 4:01
5. "He Doesn't Need Me Now" (Carter, Vandervoort) – 8:31
6. "Doozy" – 6:02
7. "Nevermore" – 5:07
8. "Malibu" – 7:04
9. "Blue Moonlight" – 5:50
10. "Evening Star" – 5:27
11. "Slow Carousel" – 4:44
12. "Whisper to One" (Carter, Al Stillman) – 4:02
13. "I'm the Caring Kind" (Carter, Irving Gordon) – 5:52
14. "When Hilma Smiles" – 4:15
- Recorded at Group IV Studios, Hollywood, CA on July 26, 27, and 28, 1995 (tracks 1–3 & 8–10) and at Master Sound Astoria, Astoria, NY, on June 26, 27, & 28, 1995 (tracks 4–7 & 11–14)

== Personnel ==
- Benny Carter – alto saxophone, vocals
- Warren Vaché – cornet (tracks 1–11 & 13)
- Chris Neville – piano
- Steve LaSpina – bass (tracks 1–13)
- Sherman Ferguson – drums (tracks 1, 2, 4–9 & 11–13)

=== Guests ===
- Joe Williams (track 1), Diana Krall (track 2), Ruth Brown (track 3), Billy Stritch (tracks 4 & 7), Nancy Marano (tracks 5 & 11), Jon Hendricks (track 6), Lainie Kazan (track 8), Marlena Shaw (track 9), Kenny Rankin (track 10), Barbara Lea (track 12), Weslia Whitfield (track 13) – vocals
- Roy McCurdy – drums (tracks 3 & 10)
