= Legends (Benny Carter album) =

Studio album by Benny Carter featuring Hank Jones
- Released: 1993
- Recorded: June 16–17, 1992
- Studio: BMG Studios, New York City, NY
- Genre: Jazz
- Length: 68:37
- Label: MusicMasters; 65087-2
- Producer: Ed Berger

Benny Carter chronology
Harlem Renaissance (1992)	Legends (1993)	Elegy in Blue (1993)

Legends is an album by saxophonist/composer Benny Carter recorded in 1992 and released by the MusicMasters label.

== Reception ==
Professional ratings
Review scores
Source	Rating
AllMusic	4/5 stars
Jazz Forum	4.5/5 stars

AllMusic reviewer Scott Yanow stated "The great altoist Benny Carter is in typically remarkable form at age 85 with a quartet, on five duets with pianist Hank Jones, and on three selections with the truly remarkable trumpeter Doc Cheatham (87 years old at the time). ... there is not a weak track on this classic disc. This set would be recommended even if Carter were 55 rather than 85; the music is timeless and often glorious".

Marcin Kydryński of Polish Jazz Forum magazine was fascinated with the album: "Legends" has the same weight for me as "Jurassic Park" does for cinema. It's a return, a nostalgic journey into a world long gone... Essential listening for all jazz lovers under sixty."

== Track listing ==
All compositions by Benny Carter except where noted

1. "The More I See You" (Harry Warren, Mack Gordon) – 6:46
2. "I Was Wrong" – 6:50
3. "Wonderland" – 6:26
4. "Blues in My Heart" – 10:52
5. "You Are" – 4:44
6. "People Time" – 3:28
7. "No Greater Love" (Isham Jones, Marty Symes) – 6:32
8. "Sunset Glow" – 3:21
9. "The Little Things That Mean So Much" (Teddy Wilson, Harold Adamson) – 6:33
10. "The Legend" – 5:06
11. "Honeysuckle Rose" (Fats Waller, Andy Razaf) – 7:59

== Personnel ==
- Benny Carter – alto saxophone
- Doc Cheatham – trumpet (tracks 4, 9 & 11)
- Chris Neville (tracks 9 & 11), Hank Jones (tracks 1–8 & 10) – piano
- Christian McBride – bass (tracks 1, 2, 4, 7, 9 & 11)
- Lewis Nash – drums (tracks 1, 2, 4, 7, 9 & 11)
