= Carmen Bradford =

American jazz singer (born 1960)

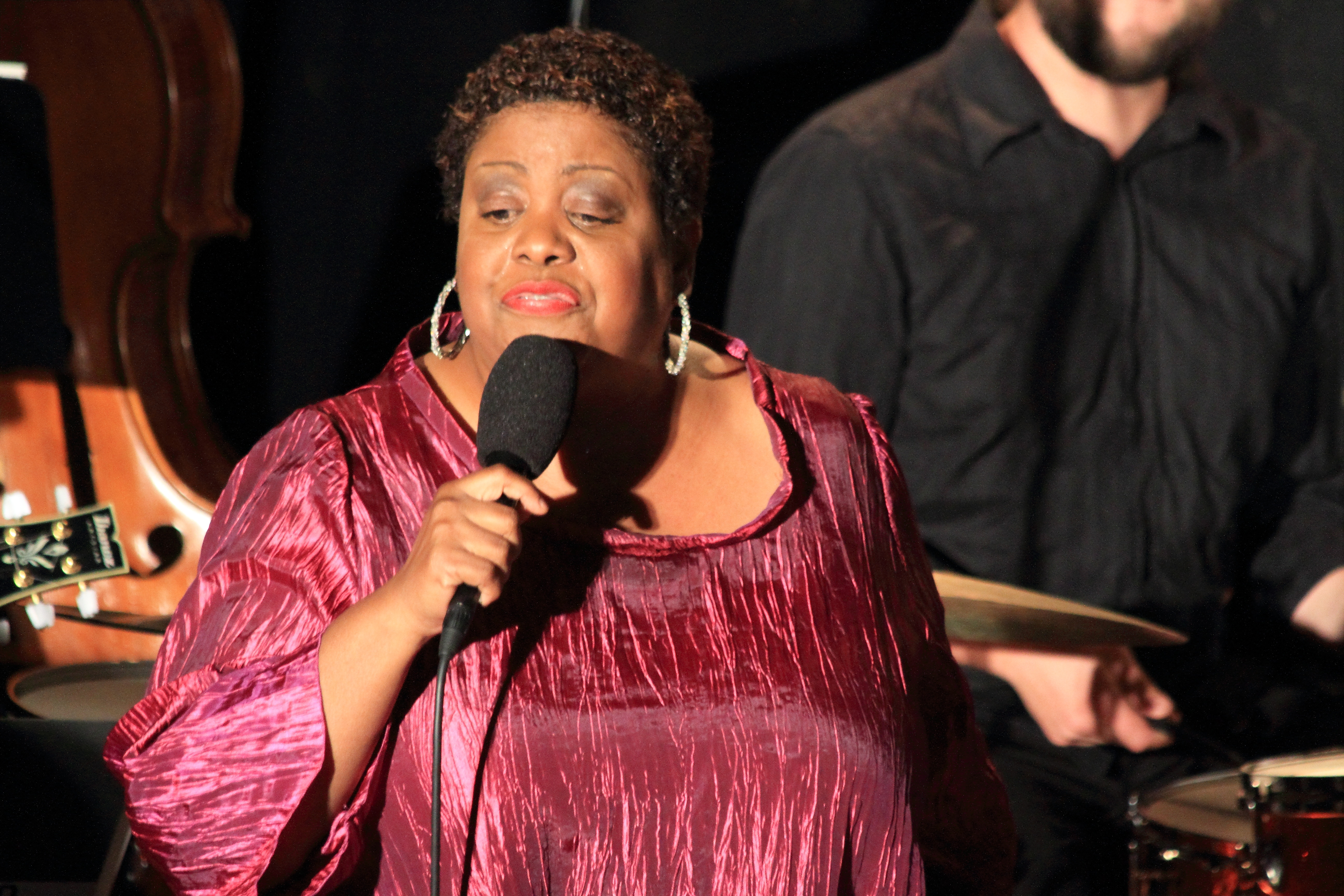
- Bradford at INNtöne Jazzfestival, 2017

Background information
- Born: July 19, 1960 (age 66); Austin, Texas, U.S.
- Genre: Jazz
- Occupations: Singer; educator
- Years active: 1982–present
- Formerly of: Count Basie Orchestra
- Website: carmenbradford.com

Carmen Bradford (born July 19, 1960, in Austin, Texas) is an American jazz singer. She sang with the Count Basie Orchestra from 1983 to 1991.

Bradford grew up in a musical family; her grandfather was Melvin Moore; her, father Bobby Bradford, and her mother, Melba Joyce. She studied music formally at Huston–Tillotson College, and sang as a popular singer and for television commercials before scoring an opening slot for the Count Basie Orchestra in 1982. In 1983, Basie asked her to sing with the band, and she remained a singer with the group after Basie's death, under the direction of Thad Jones and Frank Foster. In 1991, she left the group and worked under her own name, releasing several albums; she has also worked with David Murray and Kamau Daaood.

Bradford is currently Associate Professor of Vocal Jazz at Michigan State University. She previously served as the Director of the Jazz Voice Department, and a Roots, Jazz, and American Music faculty member at the San Francisco Conservatory of Music.

== Discography ==
- Finally Yours (Amazing, 1992)
- With Respect (Evidence, 1995)
- Home with You (Azica, 2004)

=== As guest ===
- Benny Carter, Songbook (MusicMasters, 1996)
- Count Basie, All About That Basie (Concord Jazz, 2018)
