= My Man Benny, My Man Phil =

Studio album by Benny Carter and Phil Woods
- Released: 1989
- Recorded: October 18–19, 1988
- Studio: RCA Recording Studio, New York City, NY
- Genre: Jazz
- Length: 62:12
- Label: MusicMasters; CIJD 60196Y
- Producer: Ed Berger

Benny Carter chronology
Cookin' at Carlos I (1990)	My Man Benny, My Man Phil (1989)	All That Jazz: Live at Princeton (1990)

Phil Woods chronology
Embraceble You (1988)	My Man Benny, My Man Phil (1989)	Phil's Mood (1990)

My Man Benny, My Man Phil is an album by saxophonist/composers Benny Carter and Phil Woods recorded in 1989 and released by the MusicMasters label.

== Critical reception ==
Professional ratings
Review scores
Source	Rating
AllMusic	4/5 stars

AllMusic reviewer Scott Yanow stated "It is extremely difficult to believe that Benny Carter was 82 years old at the time of this recording, for his strong sound (nothing feeble about his playing) and fertile ideas on alto make him sound as if he were a contemporary of Phil Woods, who was born 24 years later. Together Carter and Woods form a mutual-admiration society ... A special and relaxed but occasionally hard-swinging date, this Music Masters CD is quite enjoyable".

== Track listing ==
All tracks are written by Benny Carter except where noted.

No.	Title	Writer(s)	Length
1.	"Reet's Neet"	Phil Woods	6:21
2.	"Just A Mood (II)"		6:37
3.	"Sultry Serenade"	Tyree Glenn	6:20
4.	"We Were in Love"		4:54
5.	"My Man Benny" (Woods)"		6:46
6.	"My Man Phil"		4:34
7.	"Just A Mood (I)"		6:47
8.	"M.A. Blues"		7:52
9.	"People Time"		4:22
10.	"I'm Just Wild About Harry"	Eubie Blake, Noble Sissle	5:39
Total length:			1:00:39

== Personnel ==
- Benny Carter – alto saxophone, trumpet, vocals
- Phil Woods – alto saxophone, clarinet
- Chris Neville – piano
- George Mraz – bass
- Kenny Washington – drums
