= Over the Rainbow (Benny Carter album) =

Studio album by The Benny Carter All-Star Sax Ensemble
- Released: 1989
- Recorded: October 18 & 19, 1988
- Studio: RCA Recording Studio, New York City, NY
- Genre: Jazz
- Length: 62:12
- Label: MusicMasters; CIJD 60196Y
- Producer: Ed Berger

Benny Carter chronology
My Kind of Trouble (1989)	Over the Rainbow (1989)	Cookin' at Carlos I (1990)

Over the Rainbow is an album by saxophonist/composer Benny Carter recorded in 1988 and released by the MusicMasters label.

== Reception ==
Professional ratings
Review scores
Source	Rating
AllMusic	3/5 stars

AllMusic reviewer Scott Yanow stated "Benny Carter has recorded so frequently since the mid-'70s that it must be a constant challenge to come up with new settings for his alto. This particular Music Masters CD finds Carter taking his place in a saxophone section ... The program is split evenly between standards and Carter compositions with the altoist also writing all of the colorful arrangements. This swinging and tasteful Benny Carter recording is a credit to his superb series of Music Masters dates".

== Track listing ==
All compositions by Benny Carter except where noted

1. "Over the Rainbow" (Harold Arlen, Yip Harburg) – 8:20
2. "Out of Nowhere" (Johnny Green, Edward Heyman) – 5:39
3. "Straight Talk" – 9:24
4. "The Gal from Atlanta" – 7:39
5. "The Pawnbroker" (Quincy Jones) – 5:18
6. "Easy Money" – 11:10
7. "Ain't Misbehavin'" (Fats Waller, Harry Brooks, Andy Razaf) – 9:04
8. "Blues for Lucky Lovers" – 5:38

== Personnel ==
- Benny Carter – alto saxophone, arranger
- Herb Geller – alto saxophone
- Frank Wess, Jimmy Heath – tenor saxophone
- Joe Temperley – baritone saxophone
- Richard Wyands – piano
- Milt Hinton – bass
- Ronnie Bedford – drums
