= Elegy in Blue =

Studio album by Benny Carter
- Released: 1994
- Recorded: May 18–19, 1994
- Studio: Group IV Studios, Los Angeles
- Genre: Jazz
- Length: 68:58
- Label: MusicMasters; 65115-2
- Producer: Ed Berger

Benny Carter chronology
Legends (1993)	Elegy in Blue (1994)	Another Time, Another Place (1993)

Elegy in Blue is an album by saxophonist/composer Benny Carter recorded in 1994 and released by the MusicMasters label.

== Reception ==
Professional ratings
Review scores
Source	Rating
AllMusic	2/5 stars

"Prelude to a Kiss" won the Grammy Award for Best Instrumental Solo in 1995. AllMusic reviewer Scott Yanow stated "Benny Carter, 87 at the time of this recording, could pass musically for 57. His alto playing is as flawless as ever but 79-year-old trumpeter Harry "Sweets" Edison very much sounds his age and falters constantly throughout the date ... Edison and the so-so material cause this session to fall far short of its potential".

== Track listing ==
1. "Did You Call Her Today?" (Ben Webster) – 6:24
2. "Ceora" (Lee Morgan) – 7:53
3. "Good Queen Bess" (Johnny Hodges) – 6:46
4. "Prelude to a Kiss" (Duke Ellington, Irving Gordon, Irving Mills) – 6:25
5. "Little Jazz" (Roy Eldridge) – 6:18
6. "Blue Monk" (Thelonious Monk) – 6:02
7. "Someday You'll Be Sorry" (Louis Armstrong) – 4:54
8. "Nuages" *(Django Reinhardt) – 8:35
9. "Undecided" (Sid Robin, Charlie Shavers) – 6:30
10. "Elegy in Blue" (Benny Carter) – 9:11

== Personnel ==
- Benny Carter – alto saxophone
- Harry "Sweets" Edison – trumpet, vocals
- Cedar Walton – piano
- Mundell Lowe – guitar
- Ray Brown – bass
- Jeff Hamilton – drums
