= Cookin' at Carlos I =

Studio album by The Benny Carter
- Released: 1990
- Recorded: October 5–9, 1988
- Venue: Carlos I, New York City, NY
- Genre: Jazz
- Length: 62:12
- Label: MusicMasters; CIJD 60196Y
- Producer: Ed Berger

Benny Carter chronology
| Over the Rainbow (1989) | Cookin' at Carlos I (1990) | My Man Benny, My Man Phil (1990) |

Cookin' at Carlos I is a live album by saxophonist/composer Benny Carter recorded in 1989 and released by the MusicMasters label.

== Reception ==
Professional ratings
Review scores
| Source | Rating |
|---|---|
| AllMusic | 3/5 stars |

AllMusic reviewer Scott Yanow stated "During the late '80s up to the present, Benny Carter (now an octogenarian) has recorded a string of consistently excellent and frequently superb CDs for Music Masters. This particular effort is a rare live recording for Carter with his regular group ... The repertoire is typical of his club performances ... A special treat is Carter's trumpet solo on "Time for the Blues"; otherwise his wonderful alto dominates this fine set".

== Track listing ==
1. "You'd Be So Nice to Come Home To" (Cole Porter) – 8:11
2. "All the Things You Are" (Jerome Kern, Oscar Hammerstein II) – 9:07
3. "Key Largo" (Benny Carter, Karl Suessdorf, Leah Worth) – 8:40
4. "Just Friends" (John Klenner, Sam M. Lewis) – 8:05
5. "My Romance" (Richard Rodgers, Lorenz Hart) – 10:22
6. "'S Wonderful" (George Gershwin, Ira Gershwin) – 8:15
7. "Time for the Blues" (Benny Carter) – 8:18

== Personnel ==
- Benny Carter – alto saxophone, trumpet
- Richard Wyands – piano
- Lisle Atkinson – bass
- Al Harewood – drums
