= Harlem Renaissance (album) =

Live album by Benny Carter
- Released: 1992
- Recorded: February 7 & 9, 1992
- Venue: State Theatre, New Brunswick Cultural Center, New Brunswick, NJ
- Genre: Jazz
- Length: 99:33
- Label: MusicMasters; 65080-2
- Producer: Ed Berger

Benny Carter chronology
All That Jazz: Live at Princeton (1991)	Harlem Renaissance (1992)	Legends (1993)

Harlem Renaissance is a live album celebrating saxophonist/composer Benny Carter's 85th birthday recorded in 1992 and released by the MusicMasters label.

== Reception ==
Professional ratings
Review scores
Source	Rating
AllMusic	4/5 stars

"Harlem Renaissance Suite" won the Grammy Award for Best Instrumental Composition in 1992. AllMusic reviewer Scott Yanow stated "Benny Carter is a true marvel. At the time of this recording (a double CD), the classic altoist was already age 84, yet showed no signs of slowing down either his playing or his writing schedule. For his specially assembled big band and The Rutgers University Orchestra (which includes a full string section), Carter wrote entirely new arrangements that demonstrate that his talents have not diminished with age. ... In addition, Carter's alto is often the solo star although he does not hog the spotlight; it just naturally drifts back to him".

== Track listing ==
All compositions by Benny Carter except where noted

Disc One:

1. "Vine Street Rumble" – 11:21
2. "Sao Paolo" – 5:05
3. "I Can't Get Started" (Vernon Duke, Ira Gershwin) – 5:42
4. "Stockholm Sweetnin'" (Quincy Jones) – 5:34
5. "Evening Star" – 8:31
6. "How High The Moon" (Morgan Lewis, Nancy Hamilton) – 11:02

Disc Two:

1. "Tales of the Rising Sun Suite: August Moon" – 4:26
2. "Tales of the Rising Sun Suite: Teatime" – 3:51
3. "Tales of the Rising Sun Suite: Song of Long Ago" – 5:06
4. "Tales of the Rising Sun Suite: Samurai Song" – 3:07
5. "Tales of the Rising Sun Suite: Chow Chow" – 9:19
6. "Harlem Renaissance Suite: Lament for Langston" – 5:05
7. "Harlem Renaissance Suite: Sugar Hill Slow Drag" – 5:04
8. "Harlem Renaissance Suite: Happy Feet" – 6:54
9. "Harlem Renaissance Suite: Sunday Morning" – 4:15
10. "Harlem Renaissance Suite: Happy Feet-Reprise" – 5:11

== Personnel ==
- Benny Carter – alto saxophone, conductor, arranger
- John Eckert, Michael Mossman, Richard Grant, Virgil Jones – trumpet
- Benny Powell, Curtis Hasselbring, Dennis Wilson, Eddie Bert – trombone
- Ralph Bowen – alto saxophone, flute
- Frank Wess, Loren Schoenberg – saxophone
- Jeff Rupert – tenor saxophone
- Danny Bank – baritone saxophone, flute
- Chris Neville – piano
- Remo Palmier – guitar
- Lisle Atkinson – bass
- Kenny Washington – drums
- N. Scott Robinson – vibraphone, bells, gong, shaker
- The Rutgers University Orchestra (tracks 2-1 to 2-10):
  - Richard Rosolino, Susan Kynkor – horns
  - Katie Evans – flute
  - John Atteberry – bassoon
  - Gloria Agostini – harp
  - N. Scott Robinson – percussion (vibraphone, bells, gong, shaker)
  - Anna Lim, Grace Lee, Michael Locati, Orlando Wells, Rebecca Engstrom, Ruo Tao Mao, Suzanne Gilman, Amy Hegarty, Brigit Hammerling, Michael Jamanis, Norma Stites, Yi-Wen Jiang – violin
  - Clifford Young, Harold Levin, Jacqueline Young, Mu Ning – viola
  - Alex Kramer, Bridget MacRae, Tu Qiang, Wendy Tummon – cello
  - Jack Hayes – orchestrator
