= In the Mood for Swing =

Studio album by Benny Carter
- Released: 1988
- Recorded: November 9 & 12, 1987
- Studio: Clinton Sound, New York City, NY
- Genre: Jazz
- Length: 65:46
- Label: MusicMasters; CIJD 20144X
- Producer: Ed Berger

Benny Carter chronology
Central City Sketches (1987)	In the Mood for Swing (1988)	My Kind of Trouble (1989)

In the Mood for Swing is an album by saxophonist/composer Benny Carter recorded in 1987 and released by the MusicMasters label.

== Reception ==
Professional ratings
Review scores
Source	Rating
AllMusic	4/5 stars

AllMusic reviewer Scott Yanow stated "All 11 of the songs are somewhat obscure and therefore fresh Carter compositions and Dizzy Gillespie sits in with the group for three songs. ... the solo star throughout is the ageless Benny Carter, who at the age of 80 still seemed to be improving".

== Track listing ==
All compositions by Benny Carter

1. "I'm in the Mood for Swing" – 6:48
2. "Another Time, Another Place" – 6:18
3. "The Courtship" – 4:33
4. "Rock Me to Sleep" – 5:12
5. "Janel" – 5:25
6. "The Romp" – 5:46
7. "Summer Serenade" – 4:55
8. "Not So Blue" – 7:21
9. "You, Only You" – 6:39
10. "Blue Moonlight" – 6:06
11. "South Side Samba" – 6:43

== Personnel ==
- Benny Carter – alto saxophone
- Dizzy Gillespie – trumpet (tracks 2, 8 & 11)
- Roland Hanna – piano
- Howard Alden – guitar (tracks 1, 3, 5-7 & 11)
- George Mraz – bass
- Louis Bellson – drums
