= Ronnie Bedford =

American drummer

- Born: June 2, 1931 Bridgeport, Connecticut, U.S.
- Died: December 20, 2014 (aged 83) Powell, Wyoming
- Genres: Jazz
- Occupation(s): Musician, educator
- Instrument: Drums
- Years active: 1940s–2014
- Labels: Progressive

Ronnie Bedford (June 2, 1931 – December 20, 2014) was an American jazz drummer and professor. Born in Bridgeport, Connecticut, he played percussion for Louis Prima and later the Benny Goodman Quintet. Bedford was one of the founders of the Yellowstone Jazz Festival held annually in Cody, Wyoming, and was the recipient of the 1993 Wyoming Governor's Award for the Arts. In 1993 he released a self-published CD, Tour de West. He later produced three more albums for Progressive Records. Bedford lived in Powell, Wyoming and taught percussion at Northwest College.

== Discography ==
=== As leader ===
- Just Friends (Progressive, 1993)
- Triplicity (Progressive, 1998)
- Tour de West: Where the Beboppers Roam (Ronnie Bedford Music, 1998)
- QuaDRUMvirate (Progressive, 1999)

=== As sideman ===
With Benny Carter

- My Kind of Trouble (Pablo, 1989)
- Over the Rainbow (MusicMasters, 1989)

With Benny Carter

- Over the Rainbow (MusicMasters, 1989)

With Arnett Cobb

- Funky Butt (Progressive, 1980)

With Chris Connor

- Sweet and Swinging (Progressive, 1978)

With Buddy DeFranco

- Like Someone in Love (Progressive, 1989)

With Don Friedman

- Invitation (Progressive, 1993) – recorded in 1978
- Jazz Dancing (Solid, 2016) – recorded in 1977

With Hank Jones

- Arigato (Progressive, 1976)

With Rod Levitt

- The Dynamic Sound Patterns (Riverside, 1963)

With Pee Wee Russell

- Ask Me Now! (Impulse!, 1963)

With Derek Smith

- Plays Jerome Kern (Progressive, 1980)

With Chuck Wayne

- Morning Mist (Prestige, 1965)

Main source:
