= Central City Sketches =

Studio album by Benny Carter and the American Jazz Orchestra
- Released: 1987
- Recorded: 1987
- Genre: Jazz
- Length: 71:19
- Label: MusicMasters; CIJD 20126Z/27X
- Producer: Leroy Parkins

Benny Carter chronology
Benny Carter Meets Oscar Peterson (1986)	Central City Sketches (1987)	In the Mood for Swing (1988)

Central City Sketches is an album by saxophonist/composer Benny Carter recorded in 1987 and released by the MusicMasters label as a double LP.

== Reception ==
Professional ratings
Review scores
Source	Rating
AllMusic	4/5 stars

AllMusic reviewer Scott Yanow stated "One of the many Benny Carter recordings cut after he returned to jazz on a full-time basis in the mid-'70s, this double-LP set is the jewel among the seemingly countless number of gems ... as is often the case, Benny Carter frequently steals solo honors and his brief trumpet spot on "Central City Blues" is memorable".

== Track listing ==
All compositions by Benny Carter except where noted

1. "Doozy (Second Version)" – 5:20
2. "When Lights Are Low" – 5:00
3. "A Kiss from You" – 2:53
4. "Sleep" (Earl Burtnett, Adam Geibel) – 3:26
5. "Central City Sketches: Central City Blues" – 3:08
6. "Central City Sketches: Hello" – 4:14
7. "Central City Sketches: People" – 4:22
8. "Central City Sketches: Promenade" – 3:18
9. "Central City Sketches: Remember" – 3:34
10. "Central City Sketches: Sky Dance" – 3:28
11. "Lonesome Nights" – 5:07
12. "Doozy (First Version)" – 4:39
13. "Easy Money" – 7:00
14. "Symphony in Riffs" – 4:37
15. "Souvenir" – 4:03
16. "Blues in My Heart" – 7:00

== Personnel ==
- Benny Carter – alto saxophone, trumpet, arranger, conductor
- The American Jazz Orchestra
  - John Eckert, Marvin Stamm, Bob Millikan, Virgil Jones – trumpet
  - Britt Woodman, Eddie Bert, Jack Jeffers, Jimmy Knepper – trombone
  - Bill Easley, John Purcell – alto saxophone, flute
  - Lew Tabackin – tenor saxophone, flute
  - Loren Schoenberg – tenor saxophone
  - Danny Bank – baritone saxophone, bass clarinet
  - Remo Palmier – guitar
  - John Lewis – piano, musical director
  - Dick Katz – piano (tracks 1, 3, 5-10 & 12–15)
  - Ron Carter – bass
  - Mel Lewis – drums
