= Wonderland (Benny Carter album) =

Studio album by The Benny Carter Group
- Released: 1986
- Recorded: November 1976
- Studio: RCA Studios, New York City, NY
- Genre: Jazz
- Length: 38:44
- Label: Pablo; 2310-922
- Producer: Norman Granz

Benny Carter chronology
| Carter, Gillespie Inc. (1976) | Wonderland (1986) | 'Live and Well in Japan! (1977) |

Wonderland is an album by saxophonist/composer Benny Carter recorded in 1976 but not released by the Pablo label until 1986.

== Reception ==
Professional ratings
Review scores
| Source | Rating |
|---|---|
| AllMusic | 3/5 stars |
| The Penguin Guide to Jazz | 3.5/4 stars |

AllMusic reviewer Scott Yanow stated "Although it often has the feeling of a jam session, the fact that, in addition to two standards, there are five obscure Carter compositions makes one realize that more planning than usual went into this date, and it shows". In JazzTimes Stanley Dance wrote "Saxophonist Benny Green’s admiring notes scarcely conceal regret at the changes time wrought on Benny Carter’s fluent style-“a tendency to tongue more notes instead of playing extended legato passages, and a penchant for crotchet-triplets which had a way of breaking up the old suave flow.” What, in other words, was a gain for one part of the audience was a grievous loss for another. Here, nevertheless, are rewards for both. Besides “Misty” and “Three Little Words,” there are five of Carter’s own numbers. He is joined by Sweets Edison and Lockjaw Davis on three of these to good effect".

== Track listing ==
All compositions by Benny Carter except where noted

1. "Stroll" – 7:18
2. "Johnny" – 4:38
3. "Alta Vista" – 5:40
4. "Misty" (Erroll Garner, Johnny Burke) – 5:38
5. "Wonderland" – 6:40
6. "Three Little Words" (Harry Ruby, Bert Kalmar) – 5:14
7. "Editation" – 3:36

== Personnel ==
- Benny Carter – alto saxophone
- Harry "Sweets" Edison – trumpet
- Eddie "Lockjaw" Davis – tenor saxophone
- Ray Bryant – piano
- Milt Hinton – bass
- Grady Tate – drums
