= Benny Carter 4: Montreux '77 =

Live album by Benny Carter
- Released: 1977
- Recorded: July 13, 1977
- Venue: Montreux Jazz Festival, Switzerland
- Genre: Jazz
- Length: 43:42
- Label: Pablo Live; 2308-204
- Producer: Benny Carter

Benny Carter chronology
'Live and Well in Japan! (1977)	Benny Carter 4: Montreux '77 (1977)	Summer Serenade (1980)

Benny Carter 4: Montreux '77 is an album by saxophonist/composer Benny Carter recorded at the Montreux Jazz Festival in 1977 and released by the Pablo label.

== Reception ==
Professional ratings
Review scores
Source	Rating
AllMusic	3/5 stars
The Penguin Guide to Jazz	3.5/4 stars

AllMusic reviewer Scott Yanow stated "For this concert at the 1977 Montreux Jazz Festival, Benny Carter was in his musical prime, a condition he has thus far stayed at for over 65 years. Joined by the Ray Bryant Trio, the altoist romps through seven standards and plays some tasteful trumpet on "Body and Soul," proving once again that he is really is ageless; Carter was nearly 70 years old at the time".

== Track listing ==
1. "Three Little Words" (Harry Ruby, Bert Kalmar) – 5:30
2. "In a Mellow Tone" (Duke Ellington, Milt Gabler) – 8:13
3. "Wave" (Antônio Carlos Jobim) – 6:04
4. "Undecided" (Sid Robin, Charlie Shavers) – 5:27
5. "Body and Soul" (Johnny Green, Edward Heyman, Robert Sour, Frank Eyton) – 6:39
6. "On Green Dolphin Street" (Bronisław Kaper, Ned Washington) – 5:58
7. "Here's That Rainy Day" (Jimmy Van Heusen, Johnny Burke) – 5:51

== Personnel ==
- Benny Carter – alto saxophone, trumpet
- Ray Bryant – piano
- Niels Pedersen – bass
- Jimmie Smith – drums
