= The Explosive Side of Sarah Vaughan =

Studio album by Sarah Vaughan
- Released: 1963
- Recorded: May–July 1963
- Genre: Vocal jazz
- Length: 54:43
- Label: Roulette

Sarah Vaughan chronology
You're Mine You (1962)	The Explosive Side of Sarah Vaughan (1963)	Sarah Sings Soulfully (1963)

The Explosive Side of Sarah Vaughan is a 1963 studio album by Sarah Vaughan, arranged by Benny Carter.

This was Vaughan's first album with Carter. Her second, The Lonely Hours, was released in 1964.

== Reception ==
Professional ratings
Review scores
Source	Rating
AllMusic	3/5 stars
New Record Mirror	4/5 stars

The AllMusic review by Scott Yanow awarded the album three stars and said that Vaughan was "frequently miraculous [...] Throughout, Vaughan is in prime voice, overcoming the weaker material and uplifting the more superior songs."

== Track listing ==
1. "I Believe in You" (Frank Loesser) – 3:05
2. "Honeysuckle Rose" (Andy Razaf, Fats Waller) – 3:01
3. "Moonlight on the Ganges" (Sherman Myers, Chester Wallace) – 2:37
4. "The Lady's in Love with You" (Burton Lane, Frank Loesser) – 2:14
5. "After You've Gone" (Henry Creamer, Turner Layton) – 2:38
6. "A Garden in the Rain" (James Dyrenforth, Carroll Gibbons) – 3:16
7. "I Can't Give You Anything but Love" (Dorothy Fields, Jimmy McHugh) – 3:09
8. "The Trolley Song" (Ralph Blane, Hugh Martin) – 2:37
9. "I'm Gonna Live Until I Die" (Manny Curtis, Al Hoffman, Walter Kent) – 2:05
10. "Falling in Love with Love" (Lorenz Hart, Richard Rodgers) – 2:29
11. "Great Day" (Edward Eliscu, Billy Rose, Vincent Youmans) – 2:02
12. "Nobody Else but Me" (Oscar Hammerstein II, Jerome Kern) – 3:11

== Personnel ==
- Sarah Vaughan – vocals
- Benny Carter – arranger, conductor
