= Another Time, Another Place (Benny Carter and Phil Woods album) =

Live album by Benny Carter and Phil Woods
- Released: 1996
- Recorded: March 15, 16 & 17, 1996
- Venue: The Regattabar, Cambridge, MA
- Genre: Jazz
- Length: 136:47
- Label: Evening Star; ES-104
- Producer: Ed Berger

Benny Carter chronology
Benny Carter Songbook (1996)	Another Time, Another Place (1996)	New York Nights (1997)

Phil Woods chronology
Alto Summit (1995)	Another Time, Another Place (1996)	Astor & Elis (1996)

Another Time, Another Place is a live album by saxophonist/composers Benny Carter and Phil Woods recorded in Cambridge in 1996 and released by the Evening Star label.

== Reception ==
Professional ratings
Review scores
Source	Rating
AllMusic	4.5/5 stars

AllMusic reviewer Ken Dryden stated "Alto saxophonists Benny Carter and Phil Woods were great friends and enjoyed playing together on a number of record dates, though this double-CD live recording from a 1996 extended gig at the Regattabar proved to be the former's final release before he retired from active performing a few years afterward. A few months shy of 89 years old at the time, Carter still gives his all on his instrument and sounds like someone decades younger, while Woods' naturally more outgoing style proves complementary to the senior musician. ... Beautifully recorded, this final meeting between Benny Carter and Phil Woods is one for the ages".

== Track listing ==
All compositions by Benny Carter except where noted

Disc One:

1. "Sometimes I'm Happy" (Vincent Youmans, Irving Caesar) – 8:53
2. "Spring Will Be a Little Late This Year" (Frank Loesser) – 6:33
3. "Rock Me to Sleep" – 8:33
4. "Another Time, Another Place" – 8:29
5. "Willow Weep for Me" (Ann Ronell) – 7:33
6. "Shiny Stockings" (Frank Foster) – 10:01
7. "The Courtship" – 10:36
8. "On the Sunny Side of the Street" (Jimmy McHugh, Dorothy Fields) – 11:11

Disc Two:

1. "On Green Dolphin Street" (Bronisław Kaper, Ned Washington) – 9:16
2. "A Walkin' Thing" – 8:52
3. "Janel" – 5:46
4. "Speak Low" (Kurt Weill, Ogden Nash) – 8:50
5. "Petite Chanson" (Phil Woods) – 7:24
6. "Just Squeeze Me" (Duke Ellington, Lee Gaines) – 9:05
7. "Mood Indigo" (Ellington, Barney Bigard, Irving Mills) – 9:33
8. "How High the Moon" (Morgan Lewis, Nancy Hamilton) – 6:12

== Personnel ==
- Benny Carter – alto saxophone
- Phil Woods – alto saxophone
- Chris Neville – piano
- John Lockwood – bass
- Sherman Ferguson – drums
