= The Lonely Hours =

Studio album by Sarah Vaughan
- Released: March 1964
- Recorded: June 12 & 13, 1963
- Studios: United Recorders, Los Angeles, CA
- Genre: Vocal jazz
- Length: 40:57
- Label: Roulette
- Producer: Teddy Reig

Sarah Vaughan chronology
Star Eyes (1963)	The Lonely Hours (1964)	Vaughan with Voices (1964)

The Lonely Hours is a 1964 studio album by Sarah Vaughan, arranged by Benny Carter.

This was Vaughan's second album with Carter. Her first, The Explosive Side of Sarah Vaughan, was released in 1963.

== Reception ==
Professional ratings
Review scores
Source	Rating
AllMusic	3/5 stars

The AllMusic review by John Bush stated: "Sarah Vaughan's contribution to the genre of saloon song LPs, doesn't have a stellar selection of material...Benny Carter's refined arrangements and ensemble playing don't exactly reinforce the isolation of the title, but Vaughan sounds excellent on 'I'll Never Be the Same', 'These Foolish Things', and 'If I Had You'...Hopefully, Carter wasn't responsible for the occasionally canned sound of the strings; The Lonely Hours is a solid match of vocalist and arranger in most respects, with only the quality of the material weighing it down slightly."

== Track listing ==
1. "Lonely Hours" (Hy Glaser, Jerry Solomon) - 4:03
2. "I'll Never Be the Same" (Gus Kahn, Matty Malneck, Frank Signorelli) - 3:43
3. "If I Had You" (Jimmy Campbell and Reg Connelly with Ted Shapiro) - 3:52
4. "Friendless" (Benny Carter, Paul Vandervoort II) - 3:10
5. "You're Driving Me Crazy" (Walter Donaldson) - 3:00
6. "Always on My Mind" (Johnny Green, Norman Newell) - 3:01
7. "Look for Me (I'll Be Around)" (Sylvia Dee, Guy Wood) - 3:19
8. "What'll I Do?" (Berlin) - 2:18
9. "(In My) Solitude" (Eddie DeLange, Duke Ellington, Irving Mills) - 3:48
10. "These Foolish Things (Remind Me of You)" (Eric Maschwitz, Jack Strachey, Harry Link) - 3:44
11. "The Man I Love" (George Gershwin, Ira Gershwin) - 4:03
12. "So Long, My Love" (Sammy Cahn, Lew Spence) - 2:37

== Personnel ==
- Sarah Vaughan - vocals
- Benny Carter - arranger, conductor
