= Loren Schoenberg =

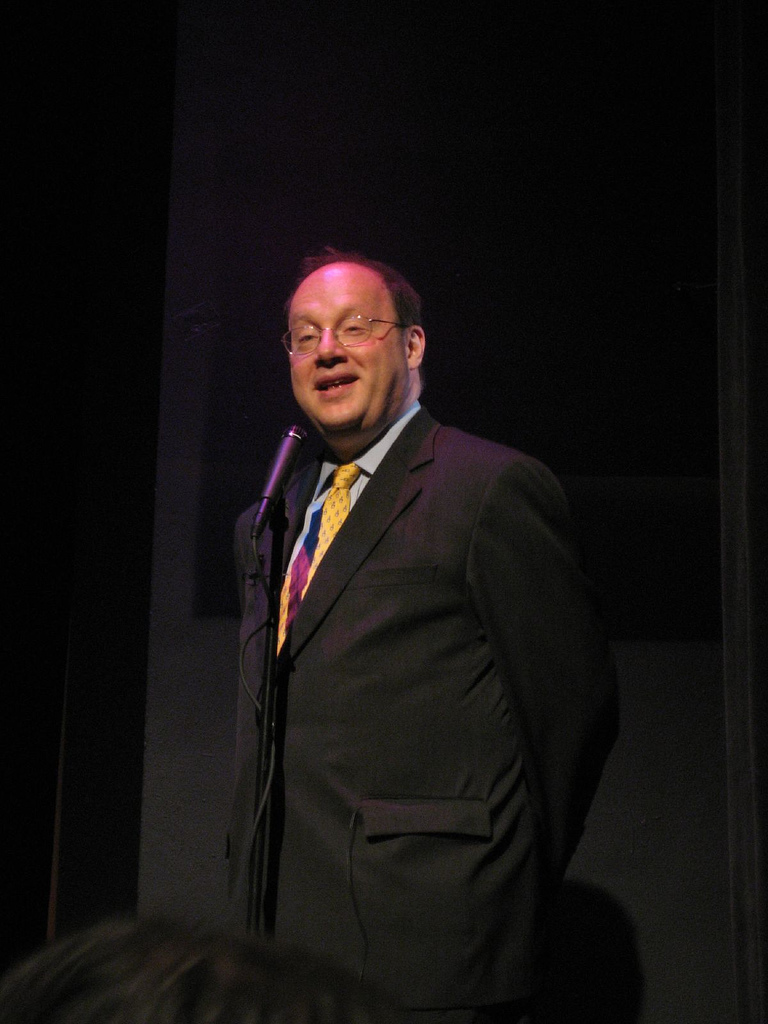

Background information
- Born: July 23, 1958 (age 68); Fair Lawn, New Jersey, U.S.
- Genre: Jazz
- Occupations: Musician, writer, educator, museum director
- Instrument: Saxophone
- Years active: 1970s–present
- Labels: Turtle Bay; Concord; Verve; MusicMasters

Loren Schoenberg (born July 23, 1958) is an American tenor saxophonist, conductor, educator, and jazz historian. He has won two Grammy Awards for Best Album Notes. He is the former executive director and current senior scholar of the National Jazz Museum in Harlem.

In the late 1970s, he played professionally with alumni of the Count Basie and Duke Ellington bands. In 1980, he formed his own big band, which in 1985 became the last Benny Goodman orchestra.

== Career ==
=== Early years and education ===
Schoenberg was born on July 23, 1958, in Fair Lawn, New Jersey, where he attended Fair Lawn High School.

=== National Jazz Museum ===
Schoenberg is Senior Scholar of the National Jazz Museum in Harlem.

== Discography ==
- 1986 That's the Way It Goes (Aviva)
- 1987 Time Waits for No One (MusicMasters)
- 1988 Solid Ground (MusicMasters)
- 1990 Just a-Settin' and a-Rockin ' (MusicMasters)
- 1990 S'posin' (MusicMasters)
- 1992 Manhattan Work Song (Jazz Heritage)
- 1999 Out of This World (TCB)
- 2006 Black Butterfly (CD Baby/THPOPS)
- 2025 Loren Schoenberg and His Jazz Orchestra featuring Kate Kortum & Warren Wolf: So Many Memories (Turtle Bay Records)

With others

- Marian McPartland & Friends – 85 Candles: Live in New York, (Concord)
- James Williams – Jazz Dialogues Vol. 1–4
- Bobby Short – 30 Years at the Cafe Carlisle
- Benny Carter – Harlem Renaissance (MusicMasters, 1992)
- Benny Carter – Central City Sketches (MusicMasters, 1987)
- Jimmy Heath – Little Man Big Band (Verve, 1992)
- American Jazz Orchestra – Ellington Masterpieces
- American Jazz Orchestra – Tribute to Jimmie Lunceford
- Benny Goodman – Let's Dance
- Doc Cheatham/David Murray/Allan Lowe – Mental Strain at Dawn
