= Beauty and the Beast (Mark Murphy album) =

- Original album cover, Dick Smith – art direction

Studio album by Mark Murphy
- Released: 1986
- Recorded: September 10 & 11, 1985
- Studios: Classic Sound Studio, New York
- Genre: Vocal jazz
- Length: 51:34
- Label: Muse Records
- Producer: Bill Mays

Mark Murphy chronology
Living Room (1984)	Beauty and the Beast (1986)	Kerouac, Then and Now (1986)

Beauty and the Beast is a 1986 studio album by Mark Murphy.

Beauty and the Beast is the 24th album by American jazz vocalist Mark Murphy. It was recorded when Murphy was 53 years old and released by the Muse Records label in the United States in 1986. The recording is a collection of songs by jazz composers and standard ballads from the Great American Songbook. Murphy contributes lyrics to three songs on the album.

== Background ==
Originally conceived as "Mark Murphy Sings the Jazz Composers", Murphy had been planning the album in early 1985, and was able to record it in September of that year. The original release did not include "Spring Friend" and "Memphis Blues", tracks 10 and 5, respectively, but they were included on a subsequent release in France on Vogue Records. In November 1986 "Poem: Beauty and the Beast" and "Vocalise" (tracks 1 and 9) were recorded.

Murphy considered himself a rhythm singer and preferred working with pianists with a strong rhythmic sensibility. Murphy said, "This rambling stuff with no rhythm, I don't consider jazz. I miss Erroll Garner like crazy. I use a lot of wonderful pianists as accompanists all over the world. I get tired of Bill Evans clones who have decided that they're going to lay back all their lives. I look around for a pulse and I don't get it, so I have to do all the work". So working with Bill Mays was ideal for him. Mays had previously worked with a diverse group of singers including Sarah Vaughan, Barry Manilow, Marlena Shaw, Maxine Weldon, Jaye P. Morgan, Andy Williams, Leonard Cohen, Larry Gatlin, Dionne Warwick, and The Manhattan Transfer, and would go on to work with many more including Frank Sinatra, Anita O'Day and Al Jarreau.

== Recording ==
Murphy is assisted by a quintet that includes keyboardist Bill Mays, trumpeter Brian Lynch and violinist Lou Lausche, a friend from Cincinnati. Mays explained to Murphy biographer Peter Jones in the book This is Hip: The Life of Mark Murphy that for Beauty and the Beast he had a small budget that would only allow for a rhythm section and two soloists. This is the second of four Murphy records with Mays on Muse Records. Mays had previously produced, arranged, conducted and played keyboard on Murphy's 1981 Bop for Kerouac, and would go on to produce, arrange and play keyboard on the 1989 Murphy album Kerouac, Then and Now, and play on the 1991 album One for Junior with Sheila Jordan. Bassist Steve LaSpina's wife went into labor during the recording and Michael Formanek was called in to complete the session recording. LaSpina would also return to play bass on Keuoac, Then and Now and later on the 2000 Some Time Ago release by Murphy. The album features frequent scat singing and improvisations by Murphy.

"Beauty and the Beast" was written by Wayne Shorter for his 1975 album Native Dancer. Murphy recites the words he wrote to Wayne Shorter's "Beauty and the Beast" before singing the song. The release of the album was delayed by months while Murphy awaited approval from Wayne Shorter's representatives for the lyrics Murphy had written to the title track. Murphy also wrote lyrics to McCoy Tyner's "Effendi," and Bill Mays' "Spring Friend". Other jazz compositions include Benny Golson's "Along Came Betty", Sonny Rollins's "Doxy", and W. C. Handy's "Memphis Blues".

Murphy was known throughout his career for singing infrequently heard verses, introductions and unknown stanzas from well known standards. His version of "I Can't Get Started" is a good example. He sings two stanzas that Ira Gershwin wrote years after completing the original for the Ziegfeld Follies of 1936. Brian Lynch is featured in a trumpet solo.

"The Lady Who Sang the Blues" was written by Edwin Duff, an Australian composer friend. "Vocalise", composed in 1915 for soprano singer Antonina Nezhdanova, contains no words. It is sung using only one vowel of the singer's choosing following the tradition of vocalises, a 19th-century practice of wordless technical etudes set to piano accompaniment. Heard more frequently in an instrumental arrangement, it is an ideal selection for scat singer and improviser Murphy. Murphy heard Rachmaninoff's "Vocalise" on the radio while driving in San Francisco. Murphy said, "I had the classical station on, and when I heard it, I had to pull the car over. It sounded so modern".

== Reception ==
Professional ratings
Review scores
Source	Rating
The Rolling Stone Jazz & Blues Album Guide	3/5 stars
The Virgin Encyclopedia of Popular Music	3/5 stars
AllMusic	5/5 stars
MusicHound Jazz	5/5 stars

The Rolling Stone Jazz & Blues Album Guide assigns the album 3 stars (meaning, average to good: Albums in the three-star range will primarily be of interest to established fans of the artist being discussed).

The Virgin Encyclopedia of Popular Music gives the album 3 stars (meaning, good, by the artist's usual standards and therefore recommended.)

The All Music Guide to Jazz assigns 5 stars. Scott Yanow writes, "Mark Murphy takes plenty of chances on this date...A very interesting and colorful set". In his own book The Jazz Singers: The Ultimate Guide, Yanow lists the album as "one of the best individual Muse sets", and writes of Murphy, "A brilliant vocal innovator, Mark Murphy can turn a song inside out in his improvisations, jumping between falsetto and low bass notes, or he can treat a ballad with real sensitivity. Based in the bebop tradition, Murphy (like Betty Carter) came up with his own individual way of extending the music. He has also been a highly influential vocal teacher and a lyricist who has written words to the songs".

Musichound Jazz: The Essential Album Guide assigns 5 bones (i.e. 5 stars, "5 bones is nirvana").

== Track listing ==
1. "Poem: Beauty and the Beast" (Mark Murphy) – 2:32
2. "Beauty and the Beast" (Wayne Shorter, Murphy) – 6:02
3. "I Can't Get Started" (Vernon Duke, Ira Gershwin) – 6:29
4. "Doxy" (Sonny Rollins) – 6:47
5. "Memphis Blues" (William Christopher Handy, George A. Norton) – 6:13
6. "Effendi" (Shorter, Murphy) – 4:44
7. "The Lady Who Sang the Blues" (Edwin Duff) – 5:32
8. "Along Came Betty" (Benny Golson) – 4:48
9. "Vocalise" (Rachmaninoff) – 3:37
10. "Spring Friend" (Bill Mays, Murphy) – 5:18

== Personnel ==
Performance

- Mark Murphy – vocals
- Michael Formanek – bass (tracks 3, 7, 9)
- Steve LaSpina – bass (1, 2, 4, 5, 6, 8, 10)
- Bill Mays – keyboard, arranger
- Joey Baron – drums
- Lou Lausche – violin
- Brian Lynch – trumpet, flugelhorn

Production

- Tim Geelan – engineer, Hillside Studio, Englewood, New Jersey November 23, 1986 (tracks 1, 9)
- A.T. Michael MacDonald – engineer, Classic Sound Studio, New York September 10 & 11, 1985 (except 1, 9)
- Bill Mays – producer
- Joe Fields – executive producer
- Joe Brescio – mastering
- Dick Smith – art direction
- Photography – Eddie O'Sullivan
- Neil Tesser – liner notes
