= American Jazz Orchestra =

American big band jazz ensemble

The American Jazz Orchestra was an American big band jazz ensemble founded in New York City, active from 1986 to 1993.

The ensemble was formed by Roberta Swann and Gary Giddins in 1986; John Lewis was its inaugural bandleader. The ensemble played in its early years in the Great Hall at Cooper Union. As an occasional ensemble, its membership fluctuated from performance to performance. It was primarily devoted to performing big band works composed in the swing and bebop eras, though it also did some earlier New Orleans and Chicago-style, as well as contemporary, pieces. Among the composers and arrangers whose works were performed by the ensemble were Harold Arlen, Count Basie, Tommy Dorsey, Duke Ellington, Dizzy Gillespie, Benny Goodman, Fletcher Henderson, Mel Lewis, Jimmie Lunceford, and Mary Lou Williams. Several jazz composers presented their own works with the ensemble: these included Muhal Richard Abrams, Benny Carter, Jimmy Heath, David Murray, and Gerald Wilson. The New York concert series featuring the band ended in 1992, but the name was preserved for an ensemble tour of Japan led by Ken Peplowski in 1993.

== Members ==
- Danny Bank
- Eddie Bert
- John Eckert
- Jimmy Heath
- Dick Hyman
- Dick Katz
- Jimmy Knepper
- Mel Lewis
- Charlie Persip
- Ray Pizzi
- John Purcell
- Loren Schoenberg
- Marvin Stamm
- Lew Tabackin
- Norris Turney
- Frank Wess
- Britt Woodman

== Discography ==
With Benny Carter

- Central City Sketches (MusicMasters, 1987) with Benny Carter
- Ellington Masterpieces (Atlantic, 1989) conducted by John Lewis
- The Music of Jimmie Lunceford (MusicMasters, 1991) conducted by John Lewis
