= Sarah Sings Soulfully =

1965 studio album by Sarah Vaughan

Studio album by Sarah Vaughan
- Released: 1965
- Recorded: June 6,12, 1963
- Genre: Vocal jazz
- Length: 35:26
- Label: Roulette
- Producer: Teddy Reig

Sarah Vaughan chronology
The Explosive Side of Sarah Vaughan (1963)	Sarah Sings Soulfully (1965)	Sarah + 2 (1965)

Sarah Sings Soulfully is a 1965 studio album by the American jazz singer Sarah Vaughan, arranged by Gerald Wilson.

== Reception ==
Professional ratings
Review scores
Source	Rating
Allmusic	4.5/5 stars
Record Mirror	4/5 stars

The Allmusic review by Scott Yanow awarded the album four stars and a half said that "Sarah Vaughan's final Roulette session before going back to Mercury was one of her best. Some of the tunes...do not look all that promising but Sassy was near the peak of her powers during this era.".

== Track listing ==
1. "A Taste of Honey" (Ric Marlow, Bobby Scott) - 3:14
2. "What Kind of Fool Am I?" (Leslie Bricusse, Anthony Newley) - 3:22
3. "Guess I'll Hang My Tears Out to Dry" (Sammy Cahn, Jule Styne) - 4:09
4. "Sermonette" (Cannonball Adderley, Jon Hendricks) - 4:19
5. "In Love in Vain" (Jerome Kern, Leo Robin) - 4:59
6. "Gravy Waltz" (Steve Allen, Ray Brown) - 2:19
7. "The Good Life" (Sacha Distel, Jack Reardon) - 3:07
8. "Moanin'" (Jon Hendricks, Bobby Timmons) - 3:12
9. "'Round Midnight" (Bernie Hanighen, Thelonious Monk, Cootie Williams) - 3:34
10. "Easy Street" (Alan Rankin Jones) - 3:30
11. "Baby, Won't You Please Come Home" (Charles Warfield, Clarence Williams) - 3:09
12. "Midnight Sun" (Sonny Burke, Lionel Hampton, Johnny Mercer) - 5:34

== Personnel ==
- Sarah Vaughan - vocals
- Teddy Edwards - tenor saxophone
- Ernie Freeman - electronic organ
- Carmell Jones - trumpet
- Milt Turner - drums
- John Collins - guitar
- Al McKibbon - double bass
- Gerald Wilson - arranger
