= All About That Basie =

Studio album by Count Basie Orchestra
- Released: September 7, 2018

All About That Basie is an album by the Count Basie Orchestra, released on September 7, 2018. On the album, the Count Basie Orchestra, now under the leadership of trumpeter Scotty Barnhart, remakes classic swing and blues classics with guest appearances by modern artists including Take 6, Stevie Wonder, and several notable jazz musicians.

== Track listing ==
Credits taken from AllMusic.

No.	Title	Writer(s)	Length
1.	"Everyday I Have the Blues" (feat. Take 6)	Peter Chatman	4:41
2.	"Can’t Hide Love" (feat. Wycliffe Gordon)	Skip Scarborough	4:26
3.	"My Cherie Amour" (feat. Stevie Wonder)	Henry Cosby/Sylvia Moy/Stevie Wonder	3:38
4.	"Don't Worry 'Bout Me" (feat. Kurt Elling)	Rube Bloom/Ted Koehler	3:24
5.	"Tequila" (feat. Jon Faddis)	Danny Flores	4:25
6.	"Hallelujah"	Leonard Cohen	4:53
7.	"April in Paris" (feat. Joey DeFrancesco)	Vernon Duke	3:53
8.	"Honeysuckle Rose" (feat. Carmen Bradford)	Andy Razaf/Fats Waller	3:08
9.	"Hello"	Adele Adkins/Greg Kurstin	4:35
10.	"Sent for You Yesterday" (feat. Jamie Davis)	Count Basie/Eddie Durham/Jimmy Rushing	4:56
11.	"From One to Another"	Thad Jones	6:07
Total length:			48:06
