= Morning Mist =

Studio album by Chuck Wayne
- Released: 1965
- Recorded: December 8, 1964
- Studio: Van Gelder Studio, Englewood Cliffs, NJ
- Genre: Jazz
- Length: 29:44
- Label: Prestige; PR 7367
- Producer: Cal Lampley

Chuck Wayne chronology
Tapestry (1964)	Morning Mist (1965)	Interactions (1973)

Morning Mist is an album by jazz guitarist Chuck Wayne which was released on the Prestige label in 1965.

== Reception ==
Professional ratings
Review scores
Source	Rating
Allmusic	3/5 stars

Allmusic reviewer Ronnie D. Lankford, Jr. stated: "Morning Mist was one of the small number of albums Wayne recorded as a leader ... Wayne's gentle touch runs toward the cool side of bop, though he's certainly capable of passionate work ... The guitarist renders himself most distinct, surprisingly, when he sets the guitar aside for the banjo ... Perhaps someone on Prestige's folk roster left the banjo behind in the studio, but whatever the reason for the choice, it was an inspired one. Morning Mist is a likable album and guitar lovers unfamiliar with Wayne's gifts will be glad".

== Track listing ==
All compositions by Chuck Wayne except where noted

1. "Goodbye" (Gordon Jenkins) – 2:30
2. "See Saw" – 3:09
3. "Li'l Darlin'" (Neal Hefti) – 4:07
4. "I'll Get Along" – 2:30
5. "Things Ain't What They Used to Be" (Mercer Ellington, Ted Persons) – 3:15
6. "Shalimar" – 3:31
7. "Someone to Watch Over Me" (George Gershwin, Ira Gershwin) – 2:46
8. "The Song Is You" (Jerome Kern, Oscar Hammerstein II) – 2:57
9. "Alone at Last" (Victor Young, Bob Hilliard) – 2:09
10. "Lovely" (Stephen Sondheim) – 2:50

== Personnel ==
- Chuck Wayne – guitar, banjo
- Joe Williams – bass
- Ronnie Bedford – drums
