= Continuum (chamber ensemble) =

American chamber music ensemble

Continuum (founded 1966) is an American classical chamber music ensemble specializing in contemporary classical music.

== Biography and career ==
Founded in New York City in 1966 by pianists Cheryl Seltzer and Joel Sachs, Continuum is a chamber music ensemble that focuses on performing and recording classical music by composers from the 20th and 21st centuries. Performing in their native New York City, and around the world, Continuum aims "to expand the audience for recent music," and performs and records both well-known contemporary composers as well as many lesser-known composers.

Initially performing works by composers such as Bartók, Stravinsky, Ravel, and Debussy, Continuum branched out to feature works by Cowell, Ives, Seeger, Thomson, and many others. Continuum often performs "retrospective concerts," which focus on a range of works by a single composer. "Exploring a broad range of their work, such concerts offer the listener deep insights into a composer's development." Continuum has performed around the world, including in such countries as Azerbaijan, Brazil, Georgia, Korea, Mongolia, Ukraine, Uzbekistan, and Venezuela.

With a rich history of recordings, Continuum has made more than 20 CDs for the Advance, Capstone, CRI, Cambria, MusicMasters, Naxos, Nonesuch, and TNC labels, recording works by Virko Baley, Henry Cowell, Ives, Kirchner, Nancarrow, Seeger, and Wolpe, among others.

Continuum was awarded the Siemens international prize for distinguished service to music and four ASCAP/Chamber Music America Awards for Adventuresome Programming.
