= Vaughan with Voices =

Studio album by Sarah Vaughan
- Released: July 1964
- Recorded: October 12, 1963
- Genre: Vocal jazz
- Length: 37:49
- Label: Mercury
- Producer: Quincy Jones

Sarah Vaughan chronology
The Lonely Hours (1964)	Vaughan with Voices (1964)	¡Viva! Vaughan (1965)

Vaughan with Voices is a 1964 studio album by Sarah Vaughan, arranged by Robert Farnon.

Recorded in Copenhagen, Denmark, produced by Quincy Jones, and accompanied by the Svend-Saaby Danish Choir, this was Vaughan's only album arranged by Robert Farnon, and one of a number of albums she made with Jones, who later discussed the project with jazz critic and composer Leonard Feather.

Farnon enveloped her with the velvet of affection and respect. She responded in kind; the instrumentalists and choir were also caught up in this reciprocal flow of love—the love of musician for a challenge that will enable him to utilize all the skills he has, to the maximum extent.

== Reception ==
Professional ratings
Review scores
Source	Rating
AllMusic	3/5 stars
Los Angeles Times	Very favorable

In his review of Mercury's 1968 re-release of the album for the Los Angeles Times, Leonard Feather called the LP "one of her best ever" as well as "the most joyous fusion of solo voice and vocal group ever committed to tape."

Ron Wynn of AllMusic gave the album three stars and called it a "Wonderful release."

== Track listing ==
1. "My Coloring Book" (Fred Ebb, John Kander) - 3:47
2. "Hey There" (Richard Adler, Jerry Ross) - 2:30
3. "Deep Purple" (Peter DeRose, Mitchell Parish) - 2:55
4. "Days of Wine and Roses" (Henry Mancini, Johnny Mercer) - 2:40
5. "I'll Be Around" (Alec Wilder) - 3:31
6. "Funny (Not Much)" (Hughie Prince, Marcia Neil, Philip Broughton) - 3:33
7. "Charade" (Mancini, Mercer) - 2:52
8. "It Could Happen to You" (Jimmy Van Heusen, Johnny Burke) - 2:49
9. "This Heart of Mine" (Harry Warren, Arthur Freed) - 2:49
10. "Then I'll Be Tired of You" (Yip Harburg, Arthur Schwartz) - 3:34
11. "How Beautiful Is Night" (Robert Farnon) - 3:11
12. "Blue Orchids" (Hoagy Carmichael) - 3:23

== Personnel ==
- Sarah Vaughan - vocals
- Svend-Saaby Danish Choir
- Robert Farnon - arranger, conductor
- Quincy Jones - producer
