= 'Live and Well in Japan! =

Live album by Benny Carter
- Released: 1978
- Recorded: April 29, 1977
- Venues: Kosei Nenkin Hall, Tokyo, Japan
- Genre: Jazz
- Length: 40:57
- Labels: Pablo Live; 2308-216
- Producer: Benny Carter

Benny Carter chronology
Wonderland (1976)	'Live and Well in Japan! (1978)	Benny Carter 4: Montreux '77 (1977)

'Live and Well in Japan! is an album by saxophonist/composer Benny Carter recorded in 1977 and released by the Pablo label the following year.

== Reception ==
Professional ratings
Review scores
Source	Rating
AllMusic	4/5 stars
The Penguin Guide to Jazz	3.5/4 stars
DownBeat	4/5 stars

AllMusic reviewer Scott Yanow stated "Benny Carter headed a talent-filled tentet for this frequently exciting concert. ... it is not at all surprising that the results would be memorable, but this date actually exceeds one's expectations". DownBeat awarded the album 4 stars. The review gave the album a high recommendation and singled out tracks 2 and 3.

== Track listing ==
1. "Squaty Roo" (Johnny Hodges) – 12:50
2. "Tribute to Louis Armstrong: When It's Sleepy Time Down South/Confessin' That I Love You/When You're Smiling" (Clarence Muse, Leon René, Otis René/Doc Daugherty, Ellis Reynolds, Al J. Neiburg/Larry Shay, Mark Fisher, Joe Goodwin) – 6:05
3. "Them There Eyes" (Maceo Pinkard, Doris Tauber, William Tracey) – 11:22
4. "It Don't Mean a Thing (If It Ain't Got That Swing)" (Duke Ellington, Irving Mills) – 10:45

== Personnel ==
- Benny Carter – alto saxophone, trumpet
- Cat Anderson, Joe Newman – trumpet
- Britt Woodman – trombone
- Budd Johnson – tenor saxophone, soprano saxophone
- Cecil Payne – baritone saxophone
- Mundell Lowe – guitar
- Nat Pierce – piano
- George Duvivier – bass
- Harold Jones – drums
