= Robert Farnon =

Canadian composer and arranger (1917–2005)

- Born: Robert Joseph Farnon; 24 July 1917; Toronto, Ontario, Canada
- Died: 23 April 2005 (aged 87); Guernsey, Channel Islands
- Occupations: Canadian-born composer, conductor, musical arranger and trumpet player.

Robert Joseph Farnon (24 July 1917 – 23 April 2005) was a Canadian composer, conductor, musical arranger and trumpet player. As well as being a composer of original works (often in the light music genre), he was commissioned by film and television producers for theme and incidental music. In later life he composed a number of more serious orchestral works, including three symphonies, and was recognised with four Ivor Novello awards and the Order of Canada.

== Life ==
Robert Farnon was born in Toronto to Robert and Elsie Farnon (née Menzies). He was commissioned as a captain in the Canadian Army and became the conductor/arranger of the Canadian Band of the Supreme Headquarters Allied Expeditionary Force sent overseas during World War II. This was the Canadian equivalent of the American Band of the SHAEF led by Major Glenn Miller. He was noted as a jazz trumpeter – his longtime friend Dizzy Gillespie once stated that he was pleased that Farnon took up composing, arranging and conducting, because Robert was the better jazz trumpeter.

He married Joanne Dallas, a singer from the SHAEF band, whom he later divorced. At the end of the war Farnon resided in Britain, and he later moved to Guernsey in the Channel Islands with his new wife Patricia Smith and his five children. His friend and fellow composer Angela Morley composed "A Canadian in Mayfair" as a tribute.

He was considered by his peers to be the finest arranger in the world, and his talents influenced many composer-arrangers, all of whom acknowledged his contributions to their work. Conductor André Previn called him "the greatest writer for strings in the world." He was the musical director and conductor for Tony Bennett's 1972 series for Thames Television, Tony Bennett at the Talk of the Town.

He won four Ivor Novello Awards, including one for "Outstanding Services to British Music" in 1991, and in 1996 he won the Grammy Award for Best Instrumental Arrangement for "Lament" performed by J. J. Johnson & his Robert Farnon Orchestra. He was also awarded the Order of Canada early in 1998.

Robert Farnon died at the age of 87, at a hospice near his home of 40 years in Guernsey. He was survived by his wife Patricia and their five children, as well as two children from his previous marriage and his many grandchildren. Farnon's older brother Brian and his younger brother Dennis were also orchestral composers, arrangers and conductors.

== Works ==
Farnon is probably best known for two famous pieces of light music, "Jumping Bean" and "Portrait of a Flirt", which were originally released in 1955 as the A and B sides on the same 78, and for "Westminster Waltz", and "A Star is Born".

Farnon also wrote the music for more than forty motion pictures, including Captain Horatio Hornblower R.N. (1951), Gentlemen Marry Brunettes (1955), The Road to Hong Kong (1962), The Prisoner (1967–68), Shalako (1968) and Bear Island (1979). He wrote the theme tune and other music for many, mostly British, television series including Colditz (1972–74), Secret Army (1977–79), Kessler (1981), and A Man Called Intrepid (1979). His score for the first episode of the spy-fi series The Champions (1968) was released on CD by Network DVD in 2009. He recorded production music for Chappell under the name Ole Jensen and the Melody Orchestra, and conducted the Queen's Hall Light Orchestra for Chappell under the name David King.

From the early 1960s, Farnon was a prominent orchestral arranger for vocalists. He arranged and conducted Frank Sinatra's only album recorded outside of the United States, Sinatra Sings Great Songs from Great Britain (1962), in London. Farnon also arranged and conducted Lena Horne's album Lena: A New Album (1976), Tony Bennett's Christmas album Snowfall (1968), and one of Sarah Vaughan's albums recorded in Denmark, Vaughan with Voices (1964).

He also completed three full-length classical symphonies, a concerto for piano and orchestra called Cascades to the Sea, a rhapsody for violin and orchestra and a concerto for bassoon; he was commissioned to compose the test piece for the 1975 Brass Band Championships of Great Britain finals held at the Albert Hall and constructed Un Vie de Matelot (A Sailor's Life), a set of variations based on an original theme.

The last piece he composed was entitled The Gaels: An American Wind Symphony, as a commission for the Roxbury High School band in honour of the school's mascot, the gael. The piece had its world premiere in May 2006. It was performed by the Roxbury High School Honors Wind Symphony under the direction of Dr. Stanley Saunders, a close friend of Farnon.

His 1954 piece, "Derby Day", was used for Rádio e Televisão de Portugal television services when they commenced on 7 March 1957. It became one of the station's anthems.

== Selected filmography ==
- I Live in Grosvenor Square (1945)
- Just William's Luck (1947)
- Paper Orchid (1949)
- Captain Horatio Hornblower R.N. (1951)
- Gentlemen Marry Brunettes (1955)
- All for Mary (1955)
- It's a Wonderful World (1956)
- True as a Turtle (1957)
- The Little Hut (1957)
- The Sheriff of Fractured Jaw (1958)
- The Road to Hong Kong (1962)
- The Truth About Spring (1965)
- Shalako (1968)
- The Disappearance (1977)
- Bear Island (1979)

== See also ==
- Music of Canada
- List of Canadian composers
