= My Kind of Trouble =

Studio album by Benny Carter
- Released: 1989
- Recorded: August 20, 1988
- Studio: Fantasy Studios, Burbank, CA
- Genre: Jazz
- Length: 48:10
- Label: Pablo; 2310-935
- Producer: Eric Miller

Benny Carter chronology
In the Mood for Swing (1988)	My Kind of Trouble (1989)	Over the Rainbow (1989)

My Kind of Trouble is an album by saxophonist/composer Benny Carter recorded in 1988 and released by the Pablo label the following year.

== Reception ==
Professional ratings
Review scores
Source	Rating
AllMusic	3/5 stars

AllMusic reviewer Scott Yanow stated "With the exception of one song, Benny Carter had never previously recorded with an organist during his first 60 years on record. ... Actually, other than the instrumentation, there is little unusual about this date. On four Carter compositions and two standards, Benny Carter (who was nearing age 81) is in typical flawless form, swinging effortlessly.". In the Chicago Tribune Jack Fuller wrote "Through all the years, Carter`s music has been ageless, and this is an album that will last".

== Track listing ==
All compositions by Benny Carter except where noted

1. "Berkeley Bounce" – 7:22
2. "Gee, Baby, Ain't I Good to You" (Andy Razaf, Don Redman) – 8:13
3. "Robbins Nest" (Illinois Jacquet, Charles Thompson) – 11:21
4. "Eric's Blues" – 5:27
5. "Only Trust Your Heart" (Carter, Sammy Cahn) – 8:52
6. "My Kind of Trouble Is You" (Carter, Paul Vandervoort II) – 6:55

== Personnel ==
- Benny Carter – alto saxophone
- Art Hillery – organ
- Joe Pass – guitar
- Andrew Simpkins – bass
- Ronnie Bedford – drums
