= Wayman Carver =

American jazz musician

Wayman Carver (December 25, 1905, Portsmouth, Virginia – May 6, 1967, Atlanta) was an American jazz flutist and reeds player. He is considered as a pioneer of the use of the flute in jazz.

Carver was a rare jazz flautist active during the swing era, and was among the earliest soloists on his main instrument to perform jazz, although Alberto Socarras preceded him by about five years. Many historians credit him as the first pure jazz flutist. His first professional experience was with J. Neal Montgomery. After he moved to New York City in 1931, he recorded and performed with Dave Nelson, and played with Elmer Snowden (1931–32), Benny Carter, and Spike Hughes (1933). His recordings from this time, among the first which included jazz flute, are cited by jazz flutists during the late 1940`s and early 1950`s as being models for their playing.

From 1934 to 1939, he played with Chick Webb on both saxophone and flute. After Webb died, he continued in the orchestra during its period of leadership under Ella Fitzgerald until 1941. After leaving the jazz scene, he became a professor of music at Clark College, where he taught saxophonists George Adams and Marion Brown, among others. Tenor saxophonist and flutist Frank Wess named Carver as one of his early flute teachers.
