= Summer Serenade =

Studio album by Benny Carter Quartet
- Released: 1982
- Recorded: August 17, 1980
- Studio: Copenhagen, Denmark
- Genre: Jazz
- Length: 44:15
- Label: Storyville; SLP 4047
- Producer: Karl Emil Knudsen, Richard Boone

Benny Carter chronology
Benny Carter 4: Montreux '77 (1977)	Summer Serenade (1982)	Skyline Drive (1983)

Summer Serenade (also released as In Copenhagen) is an album by saxophonist/composer Benny Carter recorded in 1980 in Denmark and released by the Storyville label in 1982.

== Reception ==
Professional ratings
Review scores
Source	Rating
AllMusic	2.5/5 stars
The Penguin Guide to Jazz	3/4 stars

AllMusic reviewer Scott Yanow stated "Benny Carter has recorded so many excellent swing sessions throughout his lengthy career that it is very difficult to pick out the best ones; there's too much competition".

== Track listing ==
All compositions by Benny Carter except where noted

1. "Indiana" (James F. Hanley, Ballard MacDonald) – 5:08
2. "Almost Like Being in Love" (Frederick Loewe, Alan Jay Lerner) – 7:22
3. "Summer Serenade" – 4:15
4. "All That Jazz" (Carter, Al Stillman) – 5:03
5. "Blue Star" – 8:06
6. "When Lights Are Low" – 6:01
7. "Taking a Chance on Love" (Vernon Duke) – 8:20

== Personnel ==
- Benny Carter – alto saxophone
- Kenny Drew – piano
- Jesper Lundgaard – bass
- Ed Thigpen – drums
