= Lainie Kazan =

American actress and singer (born 1940)

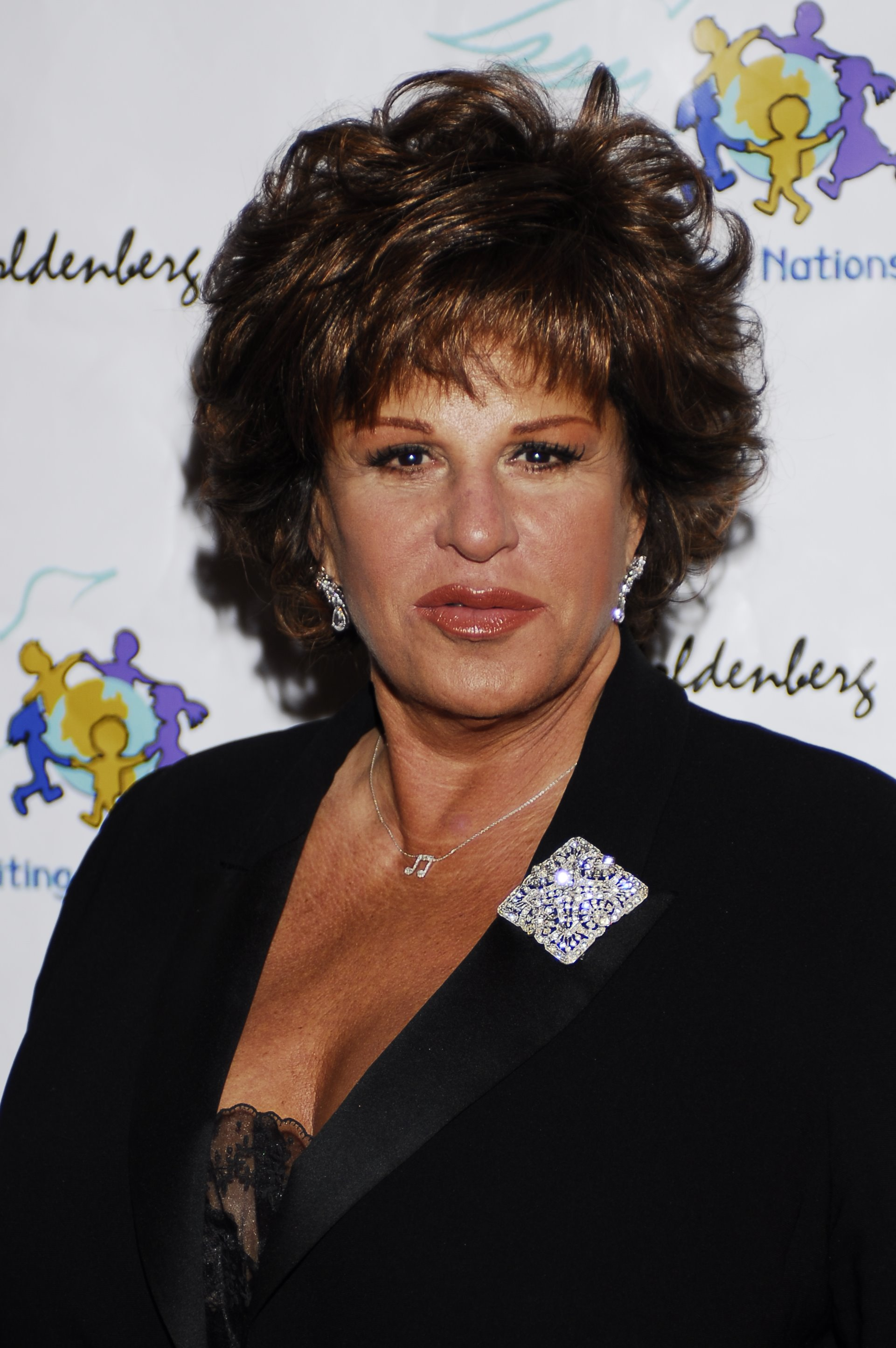
- Kazan in February 2007
- Born: Lainie Levine; May 15, 1940 (age 86); Brooklyn, New York, U.S.
- Education: Erasmus Hall High School
- Alma mater: Hofstra University
- Occupations: Actress; singer
- Years active: 1958–present
- Known for: My Favorite Year; My Big Fat Greek Wedding; My Big Fat Greek Wedding 2 My Big Fat Greek Wedding 3
- Spouse: Peter H. B. Daniels (m. 1971; div. 1976)
- Children: 1
- Website: lainiekazan.com

Lainie Kazan (born Lainie Levine; May 15, 1940) is an American actress, singer and classical composer. She was nominated for the Primetime Emmy Award for Outstanding Guest Actress in a Drama Series for St. Elsewhere and the 1993 Tony Award for Best Featured Actress in a Musical for My Favorite Year. She was nominated for a Golden Globe Award for her role in My Favorite Year (1982). Kazan played Maria Portokalos in the My Big Fat Greek Wedding franchise. She also played Aunt Freida on The Nanny.

== Early life ==
Kazan was born Lainie Levine in Brooklyn, the daughter of Carole (née Kazan) and Ben Levine. She is of Ashkenazi and Sephardic Jewish descent, with Russian and Turkish roots. Some of her grandparents lived in Jerusalem before moving to Manchester, England, and settling in Brooklyn. Kazan has described her mother as "neurotic, fragile and artistic." Kazan attended Brooklyn's Erasmus Hall High School with Barbra Streisand, for whom she would later understudy. She graduated in 1956. Kazan studied theatre at HB Studio and graduated from Hofstra University in Hempstead, New York, in 1960. While at Hofstra, Kazan appeared in school musicals written and directed by a classmate, director Francis Ford Coppola, as well as actor James Caan.

== Career ==
Kazan made her Broadway debut in 1961 with the musical The Happiest Girl in the World. She appeared the following year in another musical, Bravo Giovanni, and understudied Barbra Streisand for the lead role of Fanny Brice in Funny Girl (1964). When Streisand could not perform due to a throat condition, Kazan took her place in a matinee and evening performance for one day of the show's run. Her popularity increasing, Kazan posed nude for the October 1970 issue of Playboy, which was reused in Pocket Playboy #4, issued in 1974. Her appearance in the magazine opened the door for her to headline and operate two different Playboy Jazz Clubs. Overseen by Hugh Hefner, the clubs were named Lainie's Room West and Lainie's Room East, each on opposite coasts, with the first one located in Los Angeles and the other in Manhattan. Her Playboy photographs inspired the look of Jack Kirby’s superheroine Big Barda.

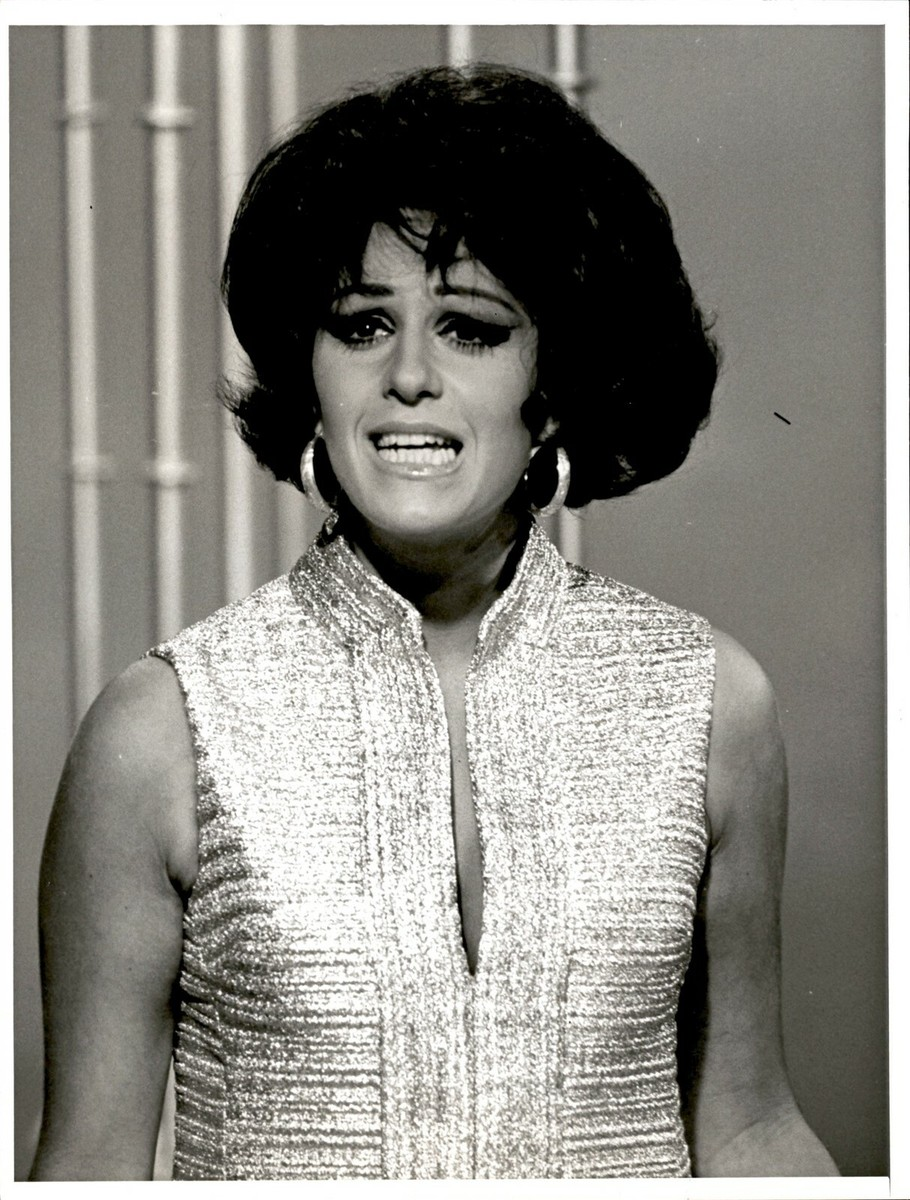
Kazan on The Dean Martin Show, November 14, 1968

Along with appearing in numerous supper clubs across the country, Kazan guest-starred on Dean Martin's variety series 26 times. Other television work includes a recurring role as Aunt Frieda on the Fran Drescher sitcom The Nanny, the mother of Kirstie Alley's character on Veronica's Closet, and various guest roles, including one on St. Elsewhere that resulted in an Emmy nomination. Her other television work has included The Paper Chase, Columbo, Touched by an Angel, and Will & Grace.

Kazan played Maria Portokalos, the mother of Toula Portokalos (Nia Vardalos) in the My Big Fat Greek Wedding franchise. Following the first film in the franchise, Kazan was featured in My Big Fat Greek Life, a short-lived series based on the film series. Other recent film work includes the mother of Adam Sandler’s character in I Now Pronounce You Chuck and Larry. Although the scene was deleted in the feature film, it is included on the DVD in the special features section. Kazan appeared as singer Ava St. Clair with Kevin James in two episodes of The King of Queens.

A life member of The Actors Studio, Kazan returned to Broadway to re-create her film role for the musical adaptation of My Favorite Year, earning a Tony Award nomination for her performance. She completed a stint in The Vagina Monologues. She has appeared in regional productions of A Little Night Music, Man of La Mancha, Gypsy, Who's Afraid of Virginia Woolf?, Hello, Dolly!, and Fiddler on the Roof. In 1984, she made a guest appearance on the Faerie Tale Theatre episode “Pinocchio” as Sophia the Blue Fairy.

In the Ugly Betty episode "Fire and Nice," Kazan played Dina Talercio, the mother of Bobby (Adam Rodriguez), who becomes the character's brother-in-law. In 2010, Kazan joined the cast of Desperate Housewives for season 7. She played the role of Mrs. Maxine Rosen, a self-employed business owner and neighbor to Susan Delfino.

== Personal life ==
After meeting musical director-arranger Peter H.B. Daniels on the Broadway musical Funny Girl, in which Kazan was a cast member and he was associate orchestra conductor, the two began a five-year relationship. They married sometime after the 1971 birth of their daughter Jennifer. The marriage did not endure, and Kazan was single again by 1976. Daniels died in 1989. Kazan also revealed that she had casually dated singer-songwriter Bob Dylan starting in the 1970s and that the relationship continued on and off for fifteen years.

In the 1970s, Kazan was diagnosed with a deep vein thrombosis (DVT). Since then, she has dedicated time to public education about DVT.

Beginning in 2012, Kazan became an adjunct professor at UCLA, teaching acting classes and directing her students in drama-department productions. She has served on the boards of the Young Musicians Foundation, AIDS Project LA, B'nai B'rith, the California Jazz Foundation, and her alma mater, Hofstra University.

On April 9, 2016, Kazan was injured in a head-on traffic collision. Kazan was driving her car when the collision occurred in Sherman Oaks, California, which necessitated hospitalization.

In December 2017, outside a California supermarket, Kazan was arrested for shoplifting. Prosecutors reached a plea deal with her.

In a 2022 Vanity Fair article, Kazan gave an interview alleging incidents of the late comic actor Jerry Lewis sexually harassing her.

== Filmography ==
=== Film ===
Year	Title	Role	Notes
1968	Dayton's Devils	Leda Martell	
1968	Lady in Cement	Maria Baretto	
1971	Romance of a Horsethief	Estusha	
1982	One from the Heart	Maggie	
1982	My Favorite Year	Belle Carroca	
1985	Lust in the Dust	Marguerita Ventura	
1985	The Journey of Natty Gann	Connie	
1986	The Delta Force	Sylvia Goldman	
1987	Harry and the Hendersons	Irene Moffitt	
1987	Medium Rare	Helga Costas	
1988	Out of the Dark	Hooker / Nancy	
1988	Beaches	Leona Bloom	
1989	Eternity	Mother Berneice	Uncredited
1991	29th Street	Mrs. Lainie Pesce	
1992	I Don't Buy Kisses Anymore	Sarah Fishbine	
1993	The Cemetery Club	Selma	
1996	Love Is All There Is	Sadie Capomezzo	
1996	Movies Money Murder	Sylvia	
1996	The Associate	Cindy Mason	
1997	Allie & Me	Camille Alexander	
1998	The Big Hit	Jeanne Shulman	
1998	Permanent Midnight	June Stahl	Uncredited
1998	The Unknown Cyclist	Rachel	
1999	Kimberly	Hanna	
1999	Mike & Spike Movie	Estelle Kazan	
2000	What's Cooking?	Ruth 'Ruthie' Seelig	
2000	Bruno	Sister Mary Perpetua	Also known as The Dress Code
2000	The Crew	Pepper Lowenstein	
2002	My Big Fat Greek Wedding	Maria Portokalos	
2002	Eight Crazy Nights	Oda	Singing voice
2003	Broadway: The Golden Age	Herself	Documentary
2003	A Good Night to Die	Diane	
2003	Gigli	Mother Susie	
2004	Red Riding Hood	Grandma	
2005	Whiskey School	Hedy Seligman	
2007	Bratz: The Movie	Bubbie	Also known as Bratz
2007	Beau Jest	Miriam Goldman	
2008	You Don't Mess with the Zohan	Gail	
2009	Oy Vey! My Son Is Gay!!	Shirley Hirsch	
2010	Expecting Mary	Lillian Littlefeather	
2012	Divorce Invitation	Elaine Lipnicks	
2013	Finding Joy	Gloria	
2013	Growing Defiant	Leslie	cameo appearance
2015	Pearly Gates	Millie	
2015	Pixels	Mickey Lamonsoff	
2016	My Big Fat Greek Wedding 2	Maria Portokalos	
2018	The Amityville Murders	Nona	
2021	Tango Shalom	Leah Zlotkin	
2023	My Big Fat Greek Wedding 3	Maria Portokalos	

=== Television ===
Year	Title	Role	Notes
1962	Car 54, Where Are You?	Girl at Bar	Episode: "Je T'Adore Muldoon"
1965	Ben Casey	Della	Episode: "Why Did the Day Go Backwards?"
1969	The Dean Martin Show	Ella	11 episodes
1977	The Bobby Vinton Show	Edna	19 episodes
1978	A Love Affair: The Eleanor and Lou Gehrig Story	Sophie Tucker	Television film
1978	Columbo	Valerie Kirk	Episode: "Make Me a Perfect Murder"
1980	A Cry for Love	Tina Weathersby	Television film
1983	Sunset Limousine	Jessie Durning	Television film
1984	The Jerk, Too	Card Player	Television film
1984	Obsessive Love	Margaret Chase	Television film
1985–1986	The Paper Chase	Rose Samuels	15 episodes
1986	Tough Cookies	Rita	6 episodes
1987	Karen's Song	Claire Steiner	13 episodes
1987–1988	St. Elsewhere	Frieda Fiscus	3 episodes
1988	The Van Dyke Show	Bunnie	Episode: "Fatal Condo"
1989	Hägar the Horrible	Helga	Voice, television short
1990	Earthday Birthday		Voice, television film
1992	Beverly Hills 90210	Rose Zuckerman	Episode: "Down and Out of District in Beverly Hills"
1993	Tales from the Crypt	Mrs. Grafungar	Episode: "People Who Live in Brass Hearses"
1994	Animaniacs	Molly	Voice, episode: "Pigeon on the Roof"
1995	Murder, She Wrote	Anna Grimaldi	Episode: "Crimson Harvest"
1995	Prince for a Day	Rose	Television film
1995–1998	The Nanny	Aunt Freida	4 episodes
1998	Safety Patrol	Mrs. Day	Television film
1998	Touched by an Angel	Doris Bernstein	Episode: "Deconstructing Harry"
2001	Will & Grace	Aunt Honey	Episode: "Moveable Feast: Part 1"
2002	Touched by an Angel	Aunt Meg	Episode: "The Princeless Bride"
2002	Returning Lilly	Dana	Television film
2003	My Big Fat Greek Life	Maria Portokalos	7 episodes
2005	The Engagement Ring	Alicia Rosa Anselmi	Television film
2006	Living with Fran	Cookie (Fran's mom)	1 episode
2007	The King of Queens	Ava St. Clair	2 episodes
2008	Boston Legal	Judge Paula Stern	Episode: "Dances with Wolves"
2010	Medium Rare	Helga Costas	Episode: "Episode #1.1"
2010	'Til Death	Donna	3 episodes
2010	Desperate Housewives	Maxine Rosen	5 episodes
2012	Modern Family	Eleanor	Episode: "New Year's Eve"
2013	Jessie	Wanda Winkle	Episode: "Throw Momma From the Terrace"
2013	Grey's Anatomy	Catherine "C.J." Jackson	Episode: "Two Against One"
2014	RuPaul's Drag Race	Herself	Episode: "Glamazon by Colorevolution"
2018	Young & Hungry	Susie Lowenstein	Episode: "Young and Third Wheel"
2018	Fuller House	Irma	Episode: "Angels' Night Out"

== Stage work ==
Year	Title	Role	Venue	Ref.
1960	Kittiwake Island	Jenny Wren	Martinique Theatre, Off-Broadway	
1961	The Happiest Girl in the World	Theodora	Martin Beck Theatre, Broadway	
1962	Bravo Giovanni	La Contessa, Singer	Broadhurst Theatre, Broadway	
1964	Funny Girl	Showgirl, Vera; standby Fanny Brice	Winter Garden Theatre, Broadway	
1973	Seesaw	Gittel Mosca	Fisher Theater, Detroit	
1980	Show Boat	performer	Wolf Trap, Virginia	
1980	Show Boat	performer	National Theatre, DC	
1986	Hello, Dolly!	Dolly Levi Gallagher	Claridge Hotel and Casino, Atlantic City	
1988	The Rink	Anna	Coconut Grove Playhouse, Florida	
1992	My Favorite Year	Belle Steinberg Carroca	Vivian Beaumont Theater, Broadway	
1994	The Government Inspector	Anna, The Governor's Wife	Lyceum Theatre, Broadway	
1994	Fiddler on the Roof	Golde	US national tour	
2001	The Vagina Monologues	performer	Westside Theatre, Off-Broadway	
2006	Bermuda Avenue Triangle	Tess LaRuffa	DuPont Theater, Wilmington	
2006	Bermuda Avenue Triangle	Tess LaRuffa	Brentwood Theater, Los Angeles	

Other

- Leave It to Jane (1959, Off-Broadway)
- Man of La Mancha (1972, Westbury Music Fair)
- Gypsy (1992, Westbury Music Fair)
- Rags (2006, World AIDS Day benefit concert)

== Discography ==
- Lainie Kazan (1966) SE-4385 MGM Records (original studio album)
- Right Now (1966) SE-4340 MGM Records (original studio album; with sleeve notes by Dean Martin)
- Love Is Lainie (1967) SE-4496 MGM Records (original studio album)
- The Love Album (1967) SE 4451 MGM Records (original studio album)
- The Best of Lainie Kazan (1969) SE-4631 MGM Records (compilation album)
- The Chanteuse is Loose (1977) LK515 Lainie & Co. (original Live album)
- Body & Soul (1995) 65126 MusicMasters (original studio album)
- In the Groove (1998) 65168 MusicMasters (original studio album)

=== As guest vocalist ===
With Benny Carter

- Benny Carter Songbook Volume II (MusicMasters, 1997)
