= Benny Carter =

American jazz musician, composer, and bandleader (1907–2003)

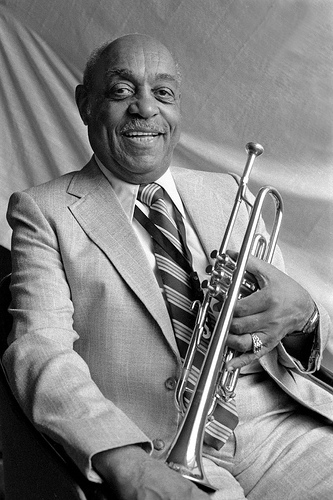
- Carter in 1984

Background information
- Born: Bennett Lester Carter; August 8, 1907; Bronx, New York, U.S.
- Died: July 12, 2003 (aged 95) Los Angeles, California, U.S.
- Genres: Swing; jazz
- Occupations: Musician; bandleader; composer; musical arranger
- Instruments: Saxophone; trumpet; clarinet
- Years active: 1920s–1997
- Labels: Clef; Norgran; Verve; Pablo; Concord; MusicMasters
- Website: bennycarter.com

Bennett Lester Carter (August 8, 1907 – July 12, 2003) was an American jazz saxophonist, clarinetist, trumpeter, composer, arranger, and bandleader. With Johnny Hodges, he was a pioneer on the alto saxophone. From the beginning of his career in the 1920s, he worked as an arranger, including writing charts for Fletcher Henderson's big band that shaped the swing style. He had an unusually long career that lasted into the 1990s. During the 1980s and 1990s, he was nominated for eight Grammy Awards, which included receiving a Lifetime Achievement Award.

== Career ==
Carter was born in New York City in 1907. He was given piano lessons by his mother and others in the neighborhood. He played trumpet and experimented briefly with C melody saxophone before settling on alto saxophone. In the 1920s, he performed with June Clark, Billy Paige, and Earl Hines, then toured as a member of the Wilberforce Collegians, led by Horace Henderson. He appeared on record for the first time in 1927 as a member of the Paradise Ten, led by Charlie Johnson. He returned to the Collegians and became their bandleader through 1929, including a performance at the Savoy Ballroom in New York City.

In his early 20s, Carter worked as arranger for Fletcher Henderson after that position was vacated by Don Redman. He had no formal education in arranging, learning by trial and error, studying existing charts, "writing the lead trumpet first and the lead saxophone first—which, of course, is the hard way. It was quite some time that I did that before I knew what a score was."

He left Henderson to take Redman's former job as leader of McKinney's Cotton Pickers in Detroit. In 1932, he formed a band in New York City that included Chu Berry, Sid Catlett, Frankie Newton, Dicky Wells, Wayman Carver, and Teddy Wilson. Carter's arrangements were complex. Among the most significant were "Keep a Song in Your Soul", written for Henderson in 1930, and "Lonesome Nights" and "Symphony in Riffs" from 1933, both of which show Carter's writing for saxophones.

By the early 1930s, Carter and Johnny Hodges were considered the leading alto saxophonists in jazz. Carter also became a leading trumpet soloist, having rediscovered the instrument. He recorded extensively on trumpet in the 1930s. Carter's short-lived orchestra played the Harlem Club in New York but only recorded a handful of records, for Columbia, OKeh and Vocalion. The OKeh sides were issued under the name The Chocolate Dandies.

Carter stands with Robert Goffin, Louis Armstrong, and Leonard Feather in 1942.

In 1933, Carter participated in sessions with the British composer/musician Spike Hughes, who visited New York City to organize recordings with prominent African American musicians. These 14 sides plus four by Carter's big band, titled at the time Spike Hughes and His Negro Orchestra, were initially only issued in England. The musicians were from Carter's band and included Red Allen, Dicky Wells, Wayman Carver, Coleman Hawkins, J. C. Higginbotham, and Chu Berry.

Carter moved to London and spent two years as arranger for the BBC Big Band. In England, France, and Scandinavia he recorded with local musicians, and he took his band to the Netherlands. In these settings, Carter played trumpet, clarinet, piano, alto and tenor saxophone, and provided occasional vocals. In 1938, he recorded in Paris with Django Reinhardt on "I'm Coming Virginia" and "Farewell Blues" in his own arrangement. He returned to America that same year and found regular work leading his band at the Savoy Ballroom in Harlem through 1941. The band included Shad Collins, Sidney De Paris, Vic Dickenson, and Freddie Webster. After this engagement, he led a seven-piece band which included Eddie Barefield, Kenny Clarke, and Dizzy Gillespie.

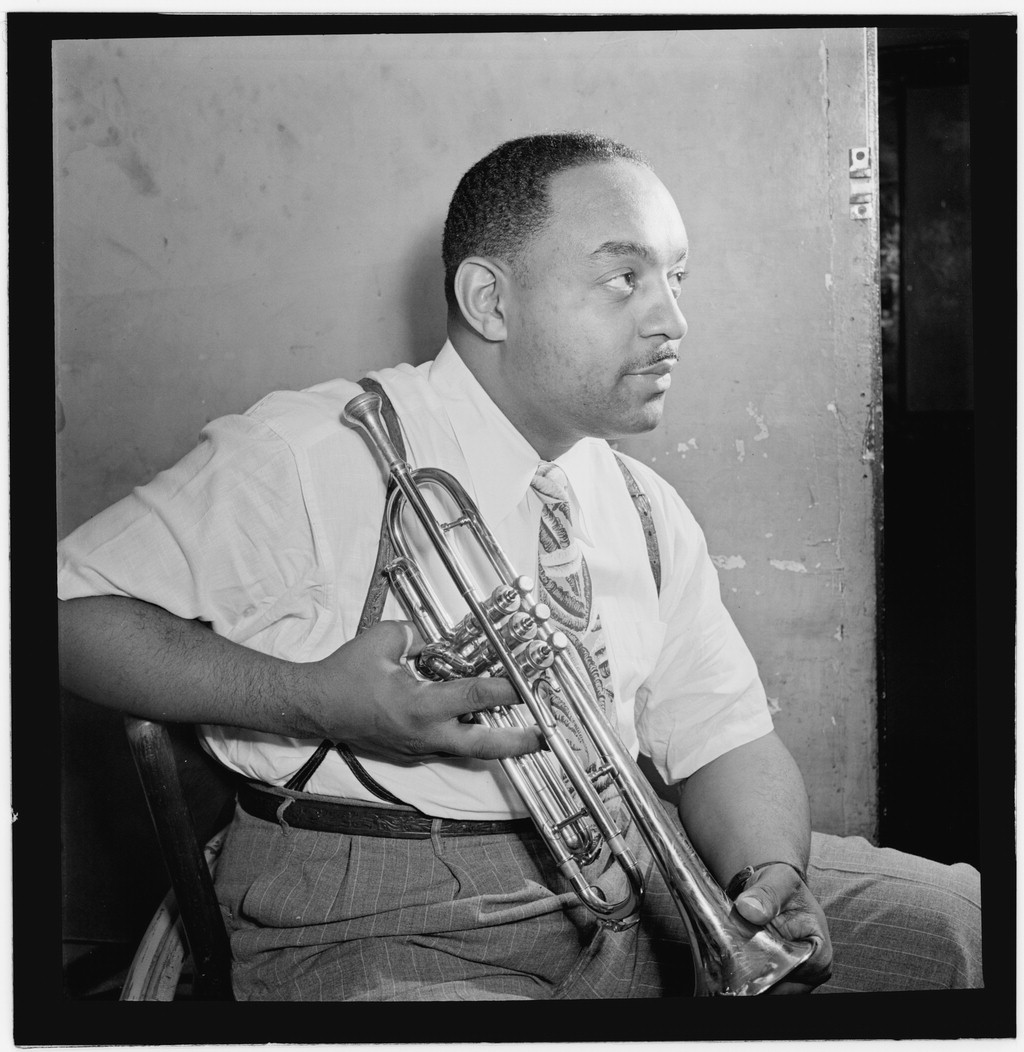
Portrait of Benny Carter, Apollo Theatre, New York City, c. October 1946

In the mid-1940s he moved to Los Angeles, forming another big band, which at times included J. J. Johnson, Max Roach, and Miles Davis. But these would be his last big bands. With the exception of occasional concerts, performing with Jazz at the Philharmonic, and recording, he ceased working as a touring big band bandleader. Los Angeles provided him many opportunities for studio work, and these dominated his time during the decades. He wrote music and arrangements for films, such as Stormy Weather in 1943. In June of 1954, he recorded with Art Tatum and drummer Louis Bellson. During the 1950s and '60s, he wrote arrangements for vocalists such as Louis Armstrong, Ray Charles, Ella Fitzgerald, Peggy Lee, and Sarah Vaughan. On something of a comeback in the 1970s, Carter returned to playing saxophone again and toured the Middle East courtesy of the U.S. State Department. He began making annual visits to Europe and Japan.

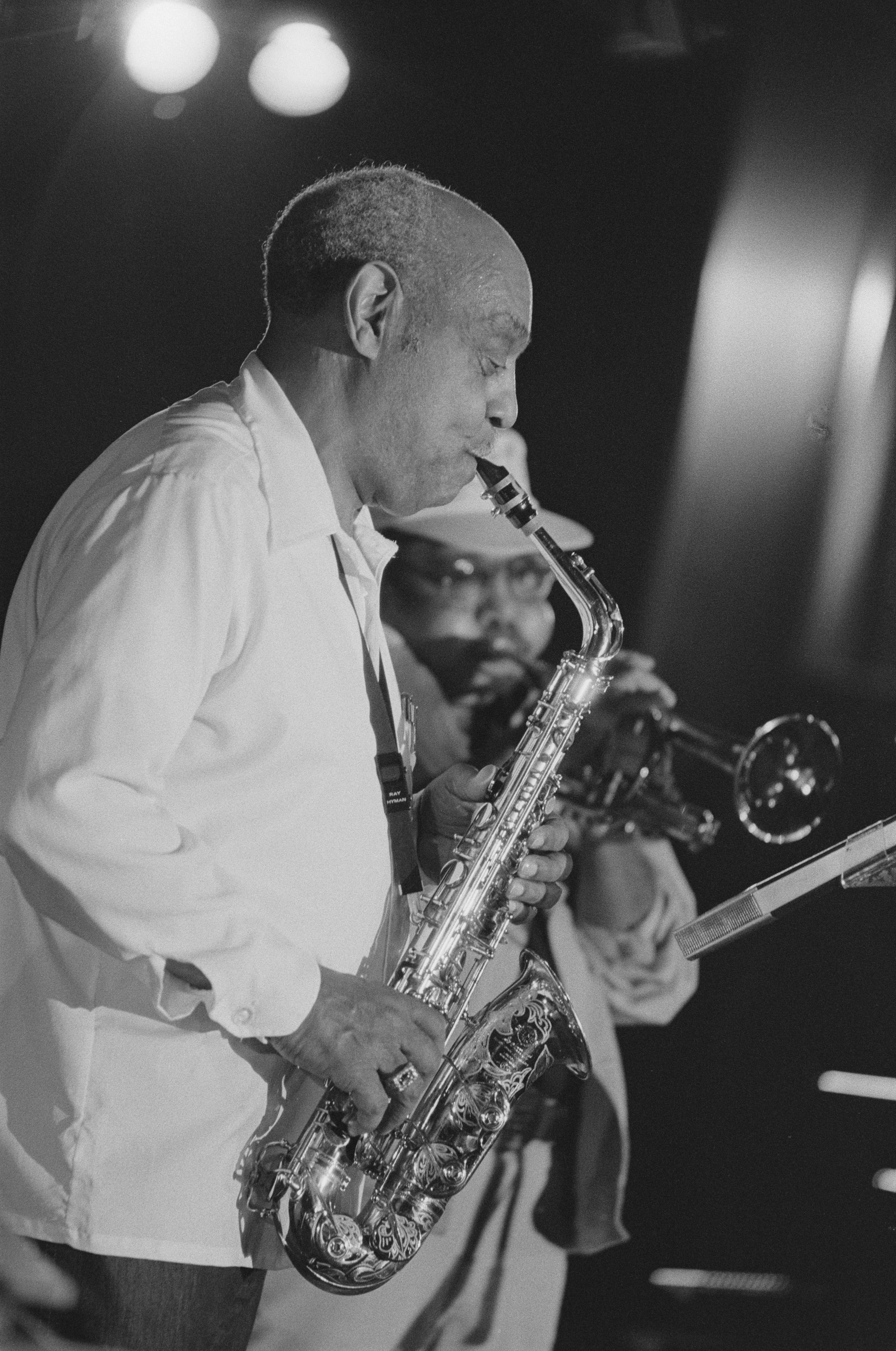
Carter performs at the North Sea Jazz Festival in 1985.

In 1969, Carter was persuaded to spend a weekend at Princeton University by Morroe Berger, a sociology professor at Princeton who wrote about jazz. This led to a new outlet for Carter's talent: teaching. For the next nine years he visited Princeton five times, most of them brief stays except for one in 1973 when he spent a semester there as a visiting professor. In 1974, Princeton gave him an honorary doctorate. He conducted teaching at workshops and seminars at several other universities and was a visiting lecturer at Harvard for a week in 1987. Morroe Berger wrote Benny Carter – A Life in American Music (1982), a two-volume work about Carter's career.

Time had little effect on Carter's abilities. During the 1980s, he wrote the long composition Central City Sketches, which was performed at Cooper Union by the American Jazz Orchestra. Another long composition, Glasgow Suite, was performed in Scotland. Lincoln Center commissioned him to write "Good Vibes" in 1990. The National Endowment for the Arts gave him a grant that led to Tales of the Rising Sun Suite and Harlem Renaissance Suite. This music was performed in 1992 when he was 85 years old.

Carter had an unusually long career. He is one of few musicians to have recorded in eight different decades. Another characteristic of his career was his versatility as musician, bandleader, arranger, and composer. He helped define the sound of alto saxophone, but he also performed and recorded on soprano saxophone, tenor saxophone, trumpet, trombone, clarinet, and piano. He helped establish a foundation for arranging as far back as 1930 when he arranged "Keep a Song in Your Soul" for Fletcher Henderson's big band. His compositions include the novelty hit "Cow-Cow Boogie" recorded by Ella Mae Morse, and the expansive Central City Sketches, written when he was 80 years old and recorded with the American Jazz Orchestra.

== Death ==
Carter died at the age of 95 in Los Angeles at Cedars-Sinai Medical Center on July 12, 2003, from complications of bronchitis.

== Awards and honors ==
He was inducted into the DownBeat Jazz Hall of Fame in 1977. In 1978, he was inducted into the Black Filmmakers Hall of Fame. In 1980, he received the Golden Score award of the American Society of Music Arrangers and Composers. His 75th birthday was commemorated by a radio station in New York that played his music nonstop for over a week. The National Endowment for the Arts gave him the NEA Jazz Masters Award for 1986.

He was given a Grammy Lifetime Achievement Award in 1987. In 1994 he won a Grammy Award for his solo on "Prelude to a Kiss" and received a star on the Hollywood Walk of Fame.

In 1989, Lincoln Center celebrated Carter's 82nd birthday with a set of his songs sung by Ernestine Anderson and Sylvia Syms. In 1990, he was named Jazz Artist of the Year in the DownBeat and JazzTimes polls. He was a Kennedy Center Honoree in 1996 and received honorary doctorates from Princeton (1974), Rutgers (1991), Harvard (1994), and the New England Conservatory of Music (1998). In 2016, the National Museum of American History made Carter the subject of its Jazz Appreciation Month poster.

In 2000, he was given the National Medal of Arts by President Bill Clinton.

=== Grammy Awards ===
- Wins: 3
- Nominations: 9

Year	Category	Title	Notes
1963	Best Background Arrangement (Behind vocalist or instrumentalist)	"Busted"	Nomination
1986	Best Jazz Instrumental Performance, Group	Swing Reunion	Nomination
1987	Lifetime Achievement Award		Win
1988	Best Instrumental Composition	"Central City Sketches (Side 2)"	Nomination
1992	Best Large Jazz Ensemble Performance	Harlem Renaissance	Nomination
1992	Best Instrumental Composition	"Harlem Renaissance Suite"	Win
1993	Best Jazz Instrumental Solo	"The More I See You"	Nomination
1994	Best Instrumental Composition	"Elegy in Blue"	Nomination
1994	Best Jazz Instrumental Performance, Individual Or Group	Elegy in Blue	Nomination
1994	Best Jazz Instrumental Solo	"Prelude to a Kiss"	Win

== Discography ==
Information from AllMusic.com

Year	Title	Notes	Label
1930-52	Benny Carter: The Master	4 CD boxset	Proper
1952	Alone Together	with the Oscar Peterson Trio + Buddy Rich	Norgran
1953	Cosmopolite		Clef
1954	The Formidable Benny Carter [10"]		Norgran
1954	The Urbane Mr. Carter [10"]		Norgran
1954	Benny Carter Plays Pretty	also released as Moonglow	Norgran
1955	New Jazz Sounds	with Dizzy Gillespie and Bill Harris	Norgran
1955	Urbane Jazz	with Roy Eldridge	Verve
1958	Jazz Giant		Contemporary
1958	Swingin' the '20s	with Earl Hines	Contemporary
1958	The Fabulous Benny Carter Band	Reissue of 1943 recordings	Audio Lab
1959	Plays Cole Porter's Can-Can and Anything Goes		United Artists
1959	Aspects	also released as The Benny Carter Jazz Calendar	United Artists
1960	Sax ala Carter!		United Artists
1961	Further Definitions		Impulse!
1962	BBB & Co.	with Ben Webster & Barney Bigard	Swingville
1963	Benny Carter in Paris		20th Century Fox
1966	Additions to Further Definitions	reissued as bonus tracks on the Further Definitions CD release in 1997	Impulse!
1976	The King		Pablo
1976	Carter, Gillespie Inc.	with Dizzy Gillespie	Pablo
1976	Wonderland	Released in 1986	Pablo
1977	'Live and Well in Japan!		Pablo Live
1977	Benny Carter 4: Montreux '77		Pablo Live
1980	Summer Serenade		Storyville
1983	Skyline Drive		Phontastic
1985	A Gentleman and His Music		Concord
1987	Billy Eckstine Sings with Benny Carter	with Billy Eckstine	EmArcy
1987	Benny Carter Meets Oscar Peterson	with Oscar Peterson	Pablo
1987	Central City Sketches	with the American Jazz Orchestra	MusicMasters
1988	In the Mood for Swing		MusicMasters
1989	My Kind of Trouble		Pablo
1989	Over the Rainbow		MusicMasters
1990	Cookin' at Carlos I		MusicMasters
1990	Marian McPartland Plays the Benny Carter Songbook		Concord Jazz
1990	My Man Benny, My Man Phil	with Phil Woods	MusicMasters
1991	All That Jazz: Live at Princeton		MusicMasters
1992	Harlem Renaissance		MusicMasters
1992	Legends	with Hank Jones - released 1997	MusicMasters
1994	Elegy in Blue		MusicMasters
1996	Benny Carter Songbook	with various vocalists	MusicMasters
1996	Another Time, Another Place	with Phil Woods	Evening Star
1997	Benny Carter Songbook Volume II	with various vocalists	MusicMasters
1997	New York Nights		MusicMasters

=== As arranger ===
Year	Title	Artist	Genre	Label
1960	Kansas City Suite	Count Basie and His Orchestra	Jazz	Roulette
1961	The Legend	Count Basie and His Orchestra	Jazz	Roulette
1962	Big Band Jazz from the Summit	Louis Bellson	Jazz	Roulette
1963	The Explosive Side of Sarah Vaughan	Sarah Vaughan	Jazz	Roulette
1963	The Lonely Hours	Sarah Vaughan	Jazz	Roulette
1963	Mink Jazz	Peggy Lee	Jazz	Capitol
1964	Sweets for the Sweet Taste of Love	Harry "Sweets" Edison	Jazz	Vee-Jay
1964	Keely Smith Sings the John Lennon—Paul McCartney Songbook	Keely Smith	Jazz	Reprise
1967	Portrait of Carmen	Carmen McRae	Jazz	Atlantic
1968	Manufacturers of Soul	Jackie Wilson and Count Basie	Soul jazz	Brunswick
1968	30 by Ella	Ella Fitzgerald	Jazz	Capitol
1975	Having a Wonderful Time	Geoff Muldaur	Eclectic Pop	Warner
1979	A Classy Pair	Ella Fitzgerald with the Count Basie Orchestra	Jazz	Pablo

=== As sideman ===
With Louis Bellson

- Skin Deep (Norgran, 1953)

With Ella Fitzgerald

- Ella Fitzgerald Sings the Harold Arlen Song Book (Verve, 1961)

With Dizzy Gillespie

- The Complete RCA Victor Recordings (Bluebird, 1937–1949, [1995])

With Jazz at the Philharmonic

- The Drum Battle (Verve, 1952 [1960])

With Peggy Lee

- Blues Cross Country (Capitol, 1962) -- also some arrangements

With Dave Pell

- I Remember John Kirby (Capitol, 1961)

With Nancy Wilson

- The Sound of Nancy Wilson (Capitol, 1968)
- Nancy (Capitol, 1969)

=== Songs composed by Carter ===
- "Blues in My Heart" (1931) with Irving Mills
- "When Lights Are Low" (1936) with Spencer Williams
- "Cow-Cow Boogie (Cuma-Ti-Yi-Yi-Ay)" (1942) with Don Raye and Gene De Paul
- "King Size Papa" with Paul Vandervoort II (1947)
- "Key Largo" (1948) with Karl Suessdorf, Leah Worth
- "Rock Me to Sleep" (1950) with Paul Vandervoort II
- "A Kiss from You" (1964) with Johnny Mercer
- "Only Trust Your Heart" (1964) with Sammy Cahn

== Film and video ==
- Thousands Cheer (1943)
- An American in Paris (1951)
- Clash by Night (1952)
- The Snows of Kilimanjaro (1952)
- Buck and the Preacher (1972)
- Jazz at the Smithsonian: Benny Carter (1982)
- Benny Carter in Japan (1986)
- Wolf Trap Salutes Dizzy Gillespie (1988)
- Benny Carter: Symphony in Riffs (1989)

== See also ==
- List of jazz arrangers
