= Ed Berger =

Jazz writer, educator, and label owner

Berger self-portrait

Edward Morris Berger (March 5, 1949 – January 22, 2017) was an American librarian, discographer, author, editor, historian, photographer, educator, jazz producer, and record label owner. For more than forty years, Berger was affiliated with the Institute of Jazz Studies at Rutgers University. He was also a longtime friend and business associate of the jazz instrumentalist and composer Benny Carter.

== Early life ==
Berger was the eldest of three sons born to Morroe and Paula Berger. Berger grew up in New Jersey, where his father was a professor of sociology at Princeton University. In addition to his specialization in Near East studies, Morroe Berger was also an expert in jazz, and it was through Morroe that Ed received his earliest exposure to the music that would become his life's focus.

In 1970, Berger received a bachelor's degree from Indiana University Bloomington, with a double major in Slavic Languages and Near Eastern Languages. After additional graduate studies in Slavic Languages at Princeton University, Berger went on to receive a Master of Library and Information Science in 1975 from Rutgers University’s Graduate School of Library Science.

== Institute of Jazz Studies ==
His professional career began the following year when Berger was hired as a curator at the Institute of Jazz Studies. He held that position from 1976 until 1987, when he was promoted to Assistant Director of the Institute. He was again promoted to Associate Director in 1995; a position he held until his retirement in 2011.

While at IJS, Berger coordinated the acquisition of a number of significant collections, including those of Abbey Lincoln, Benny Goodman, James P. Johnson, Benny Carter, Teo Macero, George Duvivier, and many others. Notably, he was instrumental in the acquisition of the Harold Flakser Collection, which is among the largest single collections of jazz periodicals in existence. Berger played a key role in enhancing access to materials in the IJS, including major work in the early 2000s transitioning the archive from analog to digital access interfaces. In addition to his day-to-day work overseeing staff and reference services for this major repository, Berger also served as project director for more than a dozen grant-funded projects at IJS, with combined budgets totaling over one million dollars. After his retirement from Rutgers in 2011, he maintained his association with IJS, working as a special projects consultant until 2017. From 1995 to 2011 Berger coordinated the monthly Jazz Research Roundtable program at IJS. Under his direction, the series brought leading jazz scholars and musicians to the institute to further jazz research and education. Visiting presenters included Gary Giddins, Richard Sudhalter, Stanley Crouch, Robin D. G. Kelley, Joe Wilder, Randy Sandke, Lara Pellegrinelli, and David Hajdu.

== Author and editor ==
In 1979, Berger contributed to his first published monograph, working with Charles Nanry on the book The Jazz Text (New York: Van Nostrand, 1979). He wrote biographical sketches of a number of major jazz figures and also authored the chapter "A Student's Guide to Jazz Research". In 1982, in collaboration with Morroe Berger and James Patrick, Berger published the two volume biography and discography Benny Carter: A Life in American Music (Metuchen, NJ: Scarecrow Press, 1982). Berger wrote portions of the biography, authored the entirety of volume two which is an annotated discography of Carter, and, after Morroe Berger's death in 1981, edited the work and saw it through publication. He updated and expanded both volumes for a second edition published in 2002.

In 1990, Berger collaborated with Teddy Reig to publish Reig's autobiography Reminiscing in Tempo: The Life and Times of a Jazz Hustler (Metuchen, NJ: Scarecrow Press, 1990), and in 1993 he wrote and compiled the monograph Bassically Speaking: An Oral History of George Duvivier (Metuchen, NJ: Scarecrow Press, 1993). Berger's final book, Softly, With Feeling: Joe Wilder and the Breaking of Barriers in American Music (Philadelphia: Temple University Press, 2014), received the Association for Recorded Sound Collections' 2015 Award for Best Historical Research in Recorded Jazz.

In addition to his books, Berger authored more than fifty book chapters, articles, and book reviews on jazz history and discography. He also authored over sixty sets of liner notes and concert notes for various jazz recordings and performances.

Berger was also an accomplished editor, serving as the co-editor for the series Scarecrow Press Studies in Jazz from 1982 to 2010, during which time he solicited, evaluated, and edited more than seventy monographs covering jazz biography, discography, musicology, and history. From 1987 to 2017 Berger co-edited the peer-reviewed Journal of Jazz Studies/Annual Review of Jazz Studies, which in 2011 became an online, open-access publication.

Loren Schoenberg, one of the many writers whose work Berger edited, summarized their interaction: “I was honored to be among the many authors that Ed lent his editorial expertise to. His patience, expertise, and especially his humor managed to bring out things that I would never have thought of his without his instigation. He was truly a master at helping others express themselves.”

== Radio host ==
While working at the IJS, Berger co-hosted a weekly radio program titled “Jazz from the Archives” on WBGO in Newark, NJ from 1979 to 2014. Berger produced and hosted over 200 interview-based programs with musicians including Jimmy Heath, Milt Hinton, Marian McPartland, Dizzy Reece, Kenny Washington, and Phil Woods. He also hosted another weekly radio program titled "Jazz Spectrum," on WWFM in Trenton, NJ from 1985 to 1987. Berger's experience conducting interviews also included multi-hour oral histories with Dan Morgenstern, Grachan Moncur III, Joe Wilder, Benny Carter, Harry Edison, Marshal Royal, Ray Bryant, George Duvivier, and Teddy Reig.

== Educator ==
Berger was active as a teacher and lecturer throughout his life. He began offering jazz history courses at Rutgers University in 1983, and beginning in 1998 he taught in the Graduate Program in Jazz History and Research. Over the years, he offered a number of courses on topics including Benny Carter, Joe Wilder, and discography at Jazz at Lincoln Center's Swing University, and he presented regularly at regional and national jazz research and library conferences from the 1970s through the 2010s.

== Benny Carter ==
One of Berger's longest and most significant relationships was his friendship and business association with Benny Carter. Berger first met Carter in the early 1970s, when Berger's father Morroe began his work on Carter's biography. In 1981, Carter hired Berger as the road manager for the Benny Carter Orchestra, a position he would keep for almost twenty years. In this role, Berger coordinated nearly a dozen tours of Japan and Thailand as well as major domestic concerts including the Presidential Inaugural Ball in 1985.

In 1987, Carter asked Berger to produce his recordings, and he went on to work with Carter on nearly twenty recordings, including two Grammy Award winners: Harlem Renaissance (MusicMasters 65080; 1992) and Elegy in Blue (MusicMasters 65115; 1994). In 1992 he and Carter founded Evening Star Records, which released fifteen albums, including works by Joe Wilder, Phil Woods, Randy Sandke, and Bill Kirchner. When Carter died on July 12, 2003, Berger coordinated a major memorial service at St. Peter's Church in NYC and contributed to an additional service in Los Angeles. As Berger noted, “Benny was like a second father to me.” Berger remained in close contact with Hilma Carter, Benny's window.

The Berger/Carter relationship lives on, in part, through the Morroe Berger – Benny Carter – Edward Berger Jazz Research Fund endowment established in 1987 (Ed's name was added in 2017). Annually, the Institute of Jazz Studies awards these grants to a select number of researchers working in jazz history, musicology, bibliography, and discography.

== Record producer and label owner ==
Berger produced over forty jazz recordings beginning in the early 1980s, when he first worked with Dan Morgenstern on the 100-LP set Franklin Mint-Greatest Jazz Recordings of All Time from 1982 to 1986. In addition to his work with Carter, Berger produced dozens of original recordings and compilations including George Shearing, Lionel Hampton, Dizzy Gillespie, Ella Fitzgerald, Count Basie, Joe Wilder, Coleman Hawkins, Ben Webster, and Ray Bryant.

== Photographer ==
Berger began taking photographs at an early age and continued the work for the rest of his life, taking tens of thousands of photographs from the 1960s through 2016. Over the course of five decades, Berger documented the entire spectrum of jazz, capturing candid moments and formal portraits of hundreds of its giants. As a result of his long history with Benny Carter, Berger was able to take thousands of photographs of Carter across several decades.

Berger was a regular contributing photographer to Jazz Times from 2001–2017, and he did additional freelance photography for periodicals including Down Beat, Jazz Journal, Cadence, the New York Times, Allegro, Washington Star, American Rag, Annual Review of Jazz Studies, and Musical Heritage Review. He also did event photography and photographic restoration work for the National Jazz Museum in Harlem beginning in 2002. His photographs have been published in the liner notes for more than forty jazz recordings, and his work has been included in a number of photographic exhibitions at the Dana Library at Rutgers University, WBGO Studios in Newark, the Sherman Library in Connecticut, and the National Jazz Museum in Harlem.

Berger photographed events including jazz rehearsals and concerts, memorials and tributes, festivals, museum openings and gallery exhibitions, and a variety of lectures and educational events. Berger took the photographs on stage, in offices and classrooms, and at homes, representing an extensive range of venues associated with a life in jazz. In 2017 the Oberlin Conservatory Library received Berger's photographs and organized them into the Ed Berger Photographic Collection.

== Awards and legacy ==
In addition to his two Grammy Awards and the ARSC award for Best Research in Recorded Jazz Music, Berger also received the Rutgers University President's Award for Excellence in Administration (1990), the Rutgers University Administrative Merit Award (1988, 1989, 1993, 1994, 1999), and the New Jersey Jazz Society Award honoring his lifetime of contributions to the music (2008).

Despite his many awards and accolades, Berger was regularly noted by friends and colleagues for his humility, modesty, and lack of interest in being in the spotlight. While his photographic portraits were treasured by those subjects he captured, he regularly donated his photographic services for organizations including the Jazz House Kids in Montclair, NJ, and the Global Communities of Support, which assisted individuals with autism and other developmental disabilities. Ed was devoted to his two nephews, whom he helped raise, and was a legendary pick-up basketball player for over five decades and countless injuries.

As Benny Carter put it, “Ed's quite unassuming, and he doesn't give you the feeling of his own importance. And I feel he's quite unaware of that, but he should not be because he's a very important man, and he is certainly an important person in my life, as was his father. He's my right arm. Hilma and I both love him very much.”

Berger died at his home in Princeton, New Jersey on January 22, 2017.
