= MusicMasters Records =

American classical and jazz record label

MusicMasters
- Parent company: Musical Heritage Society
- Founded: 1981
- Founder: Albert Nissim; Jeffrey Nissim; Robert Nissim
- Distributor: The Orchard
- Genre: Jazz; Classical
- Country of origin: U.S.
- Location: Monmouth County, New Jersey
- Official website: www.themusicalheritagesociety.com

MusicMasters was a record label that was based in Ocean Township, New Jersey.

== History ==
MusicMasters was founded in the late 1970s by Albert Nissim and his sons Robert and Jeffrey, who owned the Musical Heritage Society, which had previously only licensed European recordings for sale via mail-order.

MusicMasters produced recordings from 1981 until 1999, which were sold by mail-order and retail by the Music Heritage Society.

Initially, MusicMasters produced classical records, but began releasing jazz in 1985, when they obtained the rights to previously unreleased Yale University Library recordings by Benny Goodman.

In 2008, arrangements were made to make MusicMasters recordings available via the Orchard, a global distributor of digital audio and video.

== Awards ==
John Browning won a Grammy Award for Best Classical Solo Performance for a MusicMasters recording of Samuel Barber's solo piano music. Benny Carter won two individual Grammy Awards for MusicMasters recordings.

== Artists ==
This section contains a partial list of artists who have released recordings on the MusicMasters label.

=== A - F ===
- William Albright
- Amadeus Ensemble
- Louie Bellson
- Eubie Blake
- Paul Bley
- Ruby Braff
- John Browning
- The Dave Brubeck Quartet
- Benny Carter
- Chamber Orchestra of Europe
- Chilingirian Quartet
- Richie Cole
- Continuum
- Robert Craft
- Kenny Davern
- Eddy Davis
- Eastern Rebellion
- Duke Ellington
- Vladimir Feltsman
- Eliot Fisk

=== G - L ===
- Galliard Brass Ensemble
- George Gershwin
- Benny Goodman
- Jim Hall
- Lionel Hampton
- Frederic Hand
- Richard Harvey
- Vincent Herring
- Stephen Hough
- Freddie Hubbard
- Dick Hyman
- Milt Jackson
- Keith Jarrett
- James P. Johnson
- Lainie Kazan
- Lee Konitz
- Al Kooper
- Dennis Koster
- Hubert Laws
- Los Angeles Piano Quartet
- Peggy Lee
- The Mel Lewis Jazz Orchestra
- Eugene List

=== M - Z ===
- New York Ensemble for Early Music
- Orchestra of St. Luke's
- Paris All-Star Blues featuring Jay McShann
- Marc Puricelli
- Paula Robison
- Nadja Salerno-Sonnenberg
- Fred Schneider
- Loren Schoenberg
- Bobby Scott
- Artie Shaw
- Lonnie Smith
- Marvin Stamm
- Maria Tipo
- Stanley Turrentine
- Paul Whiteman and Maurice Peress
- Carol Wincenc
- William Wolfram
- Phil Woods
- Fabio Zanon

== See also ==
- List of record labels
