= The Silver Lining: The Songs of Jerome Kern =

Studio album by Tony Bennett and Bill Charlap
- Released: September 25, 2015
- Recorded: 2015
- Genre: Jazz
- Length: 46:27
- Label: RPM/Columbia

Tony Bennett chronology
Cheek to Cheek (2014)	The Silver Lining: The Songs of Jerome Kern (2015)	Tony Bennett Celebrates 90 (2016)

Bill Charlap chronology
Something to Remember (2012)	The Silver Lining (2015)	Notes from New York (2016)

The Silver Lining: The Songs of Jerome Kern is a studio album by Tony Bennett and Bill Charlap, released by RPM/Columbia on September 25, 2015. The album includes covers of 14 songs composed by Jerome Kern, featuring Bill Charlap on piano, Peter Washington on bass, Kenny Washington on drums, and guest pianist Renee Rosnes on four two-piano tracks.

== Reception ==
Professional ratings
Review scores
Source	Rating
AllMusic	4/5 stars

The album topped the Jazz Albums chart and debuted at 89 on the Billboard 200 albums chart. It won the Best Traditional Pop Vocal Album at the 58th Annual Grammy Awards.

== Track listing ==
All music composed by Jerome Kern; lyricists are credited below.

1. "All the Things You Are" (Oscar Hammerstein II) – 4:37
2. "Pick Yourself Up" (Dorothy Fields) – 2:55
3. "The Last Time I Saw Paris" (Hammerstein) – 3:24
4. "I Won't Dance" (Fields, Hammerstein, Otto Harbach, Jimmy McHugh) – 3:12
5. "Long Ago and Far Away" (Ira Gershwin) – 3:23
6. "Dearly Beloved" (Johnny Mercer) – 3:29
7. "The Song Is You" (Hammerstein) – 3:55
8. "They Didn't Believe Me" (Herbert Reynolds) – 4:49
9. "I'm Old Fashioned" (Mercer) – 2:45
10. "The Way You Look Tonight" (Fields) – 2:54
11. "Yesterdays" (Harbach) – 3:30
12. "Make Believe" (Hammerstein) – 2:18
13. "Nobody Else but Me" (Hammerstein) – 2:40
14. "Look for the Silver Lining" (B. G. DeSylva) – 2:36

Source: The New York Times

== Personnel ==
- Tony Bennett – vocals (1–14)
- Bill Charlap – piano (1–14)
- Peter Washington – double bass (2, 4, 6, 8, 9, 11, 13)
- Kenny Washington – drums (2, 4, 6, 8, 9, 11, 13)
- Renee Rosnes – special guest on piano (3, 5, 7, 14)

== Charts ==
Chart (2015)	Peak position
US Billboard 200	89
US Top Jazz Albums (Billboard)	1
