= Flanagan's Shenanigans =

Live album by Tommy Flanagan
- Released: June 20, 1995
- Recorded: April 2, 1993
- Venue: SAS Falkoner Center, Copenhagen
- Genre: Jazz
- Length: 69:39
- Label: Storyville; STCD 4191
- Producer: Ole Matthiessen

Tommy Flanagan chronology
Beyond the Blue Bird (1990)	Flanagan's Shenanigans (1995)	Let's Play the Music of Thad Jones (1993)

Flanagan's Shenanigans is a live album by pianist Tommy Flanagan, recorded at a concert celebrating his award of the 1993 Jazzpar Prize and released on the Danish Storyville label.

== Reception ==
Professional ratings
Review scores
Source	Rating
AllMusic	4/5 stars
The Penguin Guide to Jazz Recordings	3/4 stars

AllMusic's Ken Dryden stated: "The pianist is always a treat to hear in a live setting, and this evening is no exception... As one of the relatively rare live recordings featuring Tommy Flanagan as a leader, this CD is warmly recommended".

== Track listing ==
All compositions by Tommy Flanagan except where noted.

1. "Eclypso" - 7:43
2. "Beyond the Bluebird" - 8:13
3. "Minor Mishap" - 6:49
4. "For Lena and Lennie" (Quincy Jones) - 8:00
5. "Flanagan's Shenangians" (James Williams) - 5:19
6. "Balanced Scales" (Tom McIntosh) - 10:21
7. "But Beautiful" (Jimmy Van Heusen, Johnny Burke) - 4:14
8. "Let's" (Thad Jones) - 6:16
9. "Tin Tin Deo" (Dizzy Gillespie, Gil Fuller, Chano Pozo) - 12:44

== Personnel ==
- Tommy Flanagan - piano
- Jesper Lundgaard - bass
- Lewis Nash - drums
- Jesper Thilo - tenor saxophone (tracks 1–4)
- Henrik Bolberg Pedersen - trumpet (tracks 1–3)
- Steen Hansen, Vincent Nilsson - trombone (tracks 1–3)
- Jan Zum Vohrde - alto saxophone, flute (tracks 1–3)
- Uffe Markussen - tenor saxophone, soprano saxophone, bass clarinet (tracks 1–3)
- Flemming Madsen - baritone saxophone, bass clarinet (tracks 1–3)
