= Let's Play the Music of Thad Jones =

Studio album by Tommy Flanagan
- Released: 1993
- Recorded: April 4, 1993
- Studio: Focus, Denmark
- Genre: Jazz
- Length: 58:47
- Label: Enja; 8040
- Producer: Diana Flanagan

Tommy Flanagan chronology
Flanagan's Shenanigans (1993)	Let's Play the Music of Thad Jones (1993)	Lady Be Good ... For Ella (1993)

Let's Play the Music of Thad Jones is an album by pianist Tommy Flanagan featuring compositions by Thad Jones, recorded in 1993 for the Enja label.

== Reception ==
Professional ratings
Review scores
Source	Rating
AllMusic	4.5/5 stars
The Penguin Guide to Jazz	4/4 stars

AllMusic's Scott Yanow stated: "Congratulations are due Tommy Flanagan for putting together a consistently swinging and tasteful salute to Thad Jones, a very talented composer".

== Track listing ==
All compositions by Thad Jones.

1. "Let's" – 5:32
2. "Mean What You Say" – 5:39
3. "To You" – 3:34
4. "Bird Song" – 5:28
5. "Scratch" – 5:23
6. "Thadrack" – 4:38
7. "A Child Is Born" – 6:19
8. "Three in One" – 6:03
9. "Quietude" – 5:12
10. "Zec" – 3:50
11. "Elusive" – 7:09

== Personnel ==
- Tommy Flanagan – piano
- Jesper Lundgaard – bass
- Lewis Nash – drums
