= Mosaic: A Celebration of Blue Note Records =

Studio album by The Blue Note 7
- Released: January 13, 2009
- Recorded: May 27–28, 2008
- Studio: Bennett Studios, Englewood, New Jersey
- Genre: Jazz, Post-bop
- Length: 57:57
- Label: Blue Note Records/EMI
- Producer: Bill Charlap, Michael Cuscuna and Eli Wolf

Professional ratings
Review scores
Source	Rating
Allmusic	link

Mosaic: A Celebration of Blue Note Records is the 2009 debut album by The Blue Note 7.

== Overview ==
The Blue Note 7 was formed in 2008 in honor of the 70th anniversary of Blue Note Records. The group consists of Peter Bernstein (guitar), Bill Charlap (piano), Ravi Coltrane (tenor saxophone), Lewis Nash (drums), Nicholas Payton (trumpet), Peter Washington (bass), and Steve Wilson (alto saxophone, flute).

The group recorded Mosaic in 2008, which was released in 2009 on Blue Note Records/EMI, and they toured the United States in promotion of the album from January until April 2009. On this album the group plays the music of Blue Note Records, with arrangements by members of the band and Renee Rosnes.

== Track listing ==
1. "Mosaic" (by Cedar Walton, arranged by Lewis Nash) – 8:31
2. "Inner Urge" (by Joe Henderson, arranged by Nicholas Payton) – 7:36
3. "Search For Peace" (by McCoy Tyner, arranged by Renee Rosnes) – 7:59
4. "Little B's Poem" (by Bobby Hutcherson, arranged by Steve Wilson) – 6:27
5. "Criss Cross" (by Thelonious Monk, arranged by Steve Wilson) – 6:55
6. "Dolphin Dance" (by Herbie Hancock, arranged by Renee Rosnes) – 7:07
7. "Idle Moments" (by Duke Pearson, arranged by Peter Bernstein) – 6:36
8. "The Outlaw" (by Horace Silver, arranged by Bill Charlap) – 6:30

== Personnel ==
Musical

- Peter Bernstein – guitar
- Bill Charlap – piano
- Ravi Coltrane – tenor saxophone
- Lewis Nash – drums
- Nicholas Payton – trumpet
- Peter Washington – bass
- Steve Wilson – alto saxophone, flute

Technical

- Bill Charlap, Michael Cuscuna and Eli Wolf – producers
- Danny Melnick – executive producer, management
- Dae Bennett – engineer
- Travis Stefl – assistant engineer
- Kurt Lundvall – mastering
- Eli Wolf – A&R
- Keith Karwelies – A&R administration
- Perry Greenfield – product management
- Gordon Jee – creative direction
- Burton Yount and Rachel Salomon – art direction and design
- Jimmy Katz – photography
- Jack Randall – booking
- Renee Rosnes – arranger
- Ira Gitler – liner notes

== External links and sources ==
- The Blue Note 7 official website
- allmusic entry
