= Lady Be Good =

Lady Be Good may refer to:

== Music ==
- Lady, Be Good (musical), a 1924 Broadway musical by George and Ira Gershwin
  - "Oh, Lady Be Good!", a song from the musical
- Lady Be Good ... For Ella, a 1993 album by Tommy Flanagan

== Film ==
- Lady Be Good (1928 film), a silent adaptation of the 1924 musical starring Dorothy Mackaill and Jack Mulhall
- Lady Be Good (1941 film), a musical starring Eleanor Powell

== Other ==
- Lady Be Good (aircraft), an American B-24D Liberator bomber, of World War II, lost in 1943 in the Libyan desert after its first and only mission

== See also ==
- Lady Behave!, a 1937 American film directed by Lloyd Corrigan
