= Lonely Town =

Lonely Town may refer to:

- "Lonely Town" (On the Town song), a 1944 song from the musical On the Town, recorded by Frank Sinatra and others
- "Lonely Town" (Brandon Flowers song), 2015
- "Lonely Town" (Stan Ridgway song) from the album Mosquitos
- "Lonely Town", song by Vulfpeck 2018
- Lonely Town (album), a 1959 Tommy Flanagan recording
