= Sunset and the Mockingbird =

Live album by Tommy Flanagan
- Released: 1998
- Recorded: March 16, 1997
- Venue: Village Vanguard, New York City
- Genre: Jazz
- Length: 133:39
- Label: Blue Note; 7243 4 93155 2
- Producer: Diana Flanagan

Tommy Flanagan chronology
Sea Changes (1996)	Sunset and the Mockingbird (1998)

Sunset and the Mockingbird (subtitled The Birthday Concert) is a live album by pianist Tommy Flanagan, recorded at the Village Vanguard in 1997 on his 67th birthday and released on the Blue Note label.

== Reception ==
Professional ratings
Review scores
Source	Rating
AllMusic	4/5 stars
The Penguin Guide to Jazz Recordings	3.5/4 stars

AllMusic's Ken Dryden called the album a "memorable set". In JazzTimes, Bill Bennett wrote: "This is one of those recordings that defines the art of the piano trio in jazz. Tommy Flanagan's musical wisdom shines through at every juncture of these performances". On All About Jazz, Jack Bowers said "As he nears 70, Tommy Flanagan, like fine wine, becomes more pleasurable and venerated with each passing day. He plays with warmth, vigor, soul, an unerring sense of rhythm and dynamics, and any other ingredient one could wish for in a Jazz pianist".

== Track listing ==
1. "Birdsong" (Thad Jones) – 9:16
2. "With Malice Toward None" (Tom McIntosh) – 10:26
3. "Let's" (Jones) – 7:19
4. "I Waited for You" (Gil Fuller, Dizzy Gillespie) – 5:27
5. "Tin Tin Deo" (Fuller, Chano Pozo) – 14:34
6. "Sunset and the Mockingbird" (Duke Ellington) – 5:52
7. "The Balanced Scales/The Cupbearers" (Mcintosh) – 12:42
8. "Good Night My Love" (Mack Gordon, Harry Revel) – 4:08

== Personnel ==
- Tommy Flanagan – piano
- Peter Washington – bass
- Lewis Nash – drums
