= The Cats (album) =

Studio album by Tommy Flanagan
- Released: December 1959
- Recorded: April 18, 1957
- Studios: Van Gelder Studio; Hackensack, New Jersey
- Genres: Jazz; hard bop
- Length: 42:29
- Labels: New Jazz/Prestige; NJ-8217
- Producer: Bob Weinstock

Tommy Flanagan chronology
Overseas (1957)	The Cats (1959)	Lonely Town (1959)

The Cats is a jazz album released in December 1959 on New Jazz, a subsidiary label of Prestige Records. It is credited to pianist Tommy Flanagan, saxophonist John Coltrane, guitarist Kenny Burrell, and trumpeter Idrees Sulieman. It was issued after Coltrane's Prestige contract had ended. The record was the first to feature Coltrane, Burrell, and Flanagan playing together in a small group. Eleven months later, the three recorded Kenny Burrell & John Coltrane, which was first released in April 1963 on the New Jazz label.

== Reception ==
Professional ratings
Review scores
Source	Rating
All About Jazz	3.5/5 stars
AllMusic	5/5 stars
The Penguin Guide to Jazz	3/4 stars
The Rolling Stone Jazz & Blues Album Guide	4/5 stars
The Virgin Encyclopedia of Jazz	3/5 stars

In a five-star review for AllMusic, Michael G. Nastos wrote: "From the opening number... you realize something special is happening... The Cats is a prelude to much more music from all of these masters that would come within a very short time period thereafter, and cannot come more highly recommended. It's a must-buy for the ages."

The authors of The Penguin Guide to Jazz Recordings stated: "it is Flanagan's stewardship of the house rhythm section that makes the gig his own... He is always at the heart of the action, helping out the hornmen when they lose their way, once or twice cutting through the verbiage to get back to the song."

A reviewer for Billboard noted that the musicians "join forces... to good results," and called the recording "a swinging, driving album featuring some hard bop, smooth bop and pretty jazz as well."

David Rickert of All About Jazz commented: "None of the tunes are all that challenging... as you might expect this gives the players plenty of opportunities to wail... The Cats isn't the best recording by any of these musicians, who recorded in various combinations elsewhere... but nevertheless The Cats is a solid album with plenty of tasty playing."

== Track listing ==
All tracks are written by Tommy Flanagan except where noted.

No.	Title	Writer(s)	Length
1.	"Minor Mishap"		7:26
2.	"How Long Has This Been Going On?"	George Gershwin; Ira Gershwin	5:58
3.	"Eclypso"		7:57
4.	"Solacium"		9:10
5.	"Tommy's Tune"		11:58
Total length:			42:29

== Personnel ==
Tommy Flanagan, John Coltrane, Kenny Burrell, Idrees Sulieman (Tracks 1, 3–5)

- Tommy Flanagan – piano
- John Coltrane – tenor saxophone
- Idrees Sulieman – trumpet
- Kenny Burrell – guitar
- Doug Watkins – bass
- Louis Hayes – drums

Flanagan trio (Track 2)

- Tommy Flanagan – piano
- Doug Watkins – bass
- Louis Hayes – drums
