= 2gether (Warren Vaché and Bill Charlap album) =

Studio album by Warren Vaché and Bill Charlap
- Released: 2001
- Recorded: December 13–14, 2000
- Studios: Ambient Recording Company, Old Greenwich
- Genre: Jazz
- Length: 52:32
- Labels: Nagel Heyer; CD 2011
- Producer: Frank Nagel-Heyer

Warren Vaché chronology
Swingtime! (2000)	2gether (2001)	The Best Thing for You (2001)

Bill Charlap chronology
Written in the Stars (2000)	2gether (2001)	Blues in the Night (2001)

2gether is an album by cornetist and fluegelhornist Warren Vaché and pianist Bill Charlap released on the German Nagel-Heyer label in 2001.

== Reception ==
Professional ratings
Review scores
Source	Rating
Penguin Guide to Jazz	👑
AllMusic	4/5 stars
All About Jazz	4/5 stars

The Penguin Guide to Jazz identified the album as part of their suggested "Core Collection" of essential jazz albums and awarded the compilation a "Crown" signifying a recording that the authors "feel a special admiration or affection for". The AllMusic review by Ken Dryden stated "This very entertaining date will stand up very well to repeated listening".

On All About Jazz, C. Michael Bailey called it:

one of the finest discs to have crossed beneath my laser in a long time. Most certainly, this disc will be in my top ten at the end of 2001, when I am called upon to vote for the best releases of the last year.

— Bailey, C. M. (September 1, 2001). "All About Jazz Review".

In JazzTimes, Doug Ramsey observed:

cornetist Warren Vache and pianist Bill Charlap play with the power of virtuosity in reserve while holding back nothing of adventurousness. They concentrate on quietness, subtlety and lyricism, but their album is loaded with spontaneity and good feeling. ...The CD is impossible to categorize, except in one of the only two categories that matter: good.

— Ramsey, D. (November 2001). "JazzTimes Review".

== Track listing ==
1. "If I Should Lose You" (Ralph Rainger, Leo Robin) - 4:53
2. "You and the Night and the Music" (Arthur Schwartz, Howard Dietz) - 3:50
3. "Darn That Dream" (Jimmy Van Heusen, Eddie DeLange) - 5:50
4. "What'll I Do?" (Irving Berlin) - 3:35
5. "Easy Living" (Rainger, Robin) - 4:15
6. "Nip-Hoc Waltz (Homage to Chopin)" (Bill Charlap) - 4:55
7. "Etude #2" (Charlap) - 3:15
8. "Soon" (George Gershwin, Ira Gershwin) - 4:31
9. "Dancing on the Ceiling" (Richard Rodgers, Lorenz Hart) - 4:51
10. "Prelude to a Kiss" (Duke Ellington, Irving Gordon, Irving Mills) - 7:48
11. "St. Louis Blues" (W. C. Handy) - 4:49

== Personnel ==
- Warren Vaché - cornet, flugelhorn
- Bill Charlap - piano
