= Lady Be Good ... For Ella =

Studio album by Tommy Flanagan
- Released: 1994
- Recorded: July 30 & 31, 1993; EastSide Sound, NYC
- Genre: Jazz
- Length: 60:52
- Label: Groovin' High; 521 617-2
- Producer: Diana Flanagan

Tommy Flanagan chronology
Let's Play the Music of Thad Jones (1993)	Lady Be Good ... For Ella (1994)	Sea Changes (1996)

Lady Be Good ... For Ella is an album by pianist Tommy Flanagan, recorded in 1993 for the Groovin' High label and featuring compositions associated with Ella Fitzgerald.

== Reception ==
Professional ratings
Review scores
Source	Rating
AllMusic	4.5/5 stars
The Penguin Guide to Jazz	3.5/4 stars

AllMusic's Michael G. Nastos stated: "Although Flanagan has many high points in an exceptional career, this is certainly up there with the best, and a great set of Cliff Notes for doing the jazz piano trio right. Highly recommended".

== Track listing ==
1. "Oh, Lady Be Good!" (George Gershwin, Ira Gershwin) - 4:48
2. "Love You Madly" (Duke Ellington) - 6:38
3. "Isn't It a Pity?" (George Gershwin, Ira Gershwin) - 5:58
4. "How High the Moon" (Morgan Lewis, Nancy Hamilton) - 5:37
5. "Smooth Sailing" (Arnett Cobb) - 3:47
6. "Alone Too Long" (Arthur Schwartz, Dorothy Fields) - 7:40
7. "Angel Eyes" (Matt Dennis, Earl Brent) - 5:33
8. "Cherokee" (Ray Noble) - 6:38
9. "Rough Ridin'" (Ella Fitzgerald, Hank Jones) - 4:53
10. "Pete Kelly's Blues" (Ray Heindorf, Sammy Cahn) - 5:28
11. "Oh, Lady Be Good!" (George Gershwin, Ira Gershwin) - 3:52

== Personnel ==
- Tommy Flanagan - piano
- Peter Washington - bass
- Lewis Nash - drums
