= Lonely Town (album) =

Studio album by Tommy Flanagan
- Released: 1979
- Recorded: March 10, 1959
- Genre: Jazz
- Label: Blue Note
- Producer: Kenneth Karp

Tommy Flanagan chronology
The Cats (1957)	Lonely Town (1979)	The Tommy Flanagan Trio (1960)

Professional ratings
Review scores
Source	Rating
AllMusic	3/5 stars

Lonely Town is an album by jazz pianist Tommy Flanagan. It is a trio recording, with bassist Joe Benjamin and drummer Elvin Jones.

== Background and recording ==
The album was recorded in New York City on March 10, 1959.

== Music ==
The compositions are by Leonard Bernstein. They are: "America" and "Tonight" from West Side Story; "Lonely Town" and "Lucky to Be Me" from On the Town; "Glitter and Be Gay" and "Make Our Garden Grow" from Candide; and "It's Love" from Wonderful Town.

== Track listing ==
All tracks composed by Leonard Bernstein (track 3 with Stephen Sondheim; track 6 with Richard Wilbur).

1. "America" – 5:55
2. "Lonely Town" – 7:28
3. "Tonight" – 3:44
4. "It's Love" – 3:45
5. "Lucky to Be Me" – 4:15
6. "Glitter and Be Gay" – 4:13
7. "Make Our Garden Grow" – 3:10

== Personnel ==
- Tommy Flanagan – piano
- Joe Benjamin – bass
- Elvin Jones – drums
