= Bill Charlap =

American jazz pianist (born 1966)

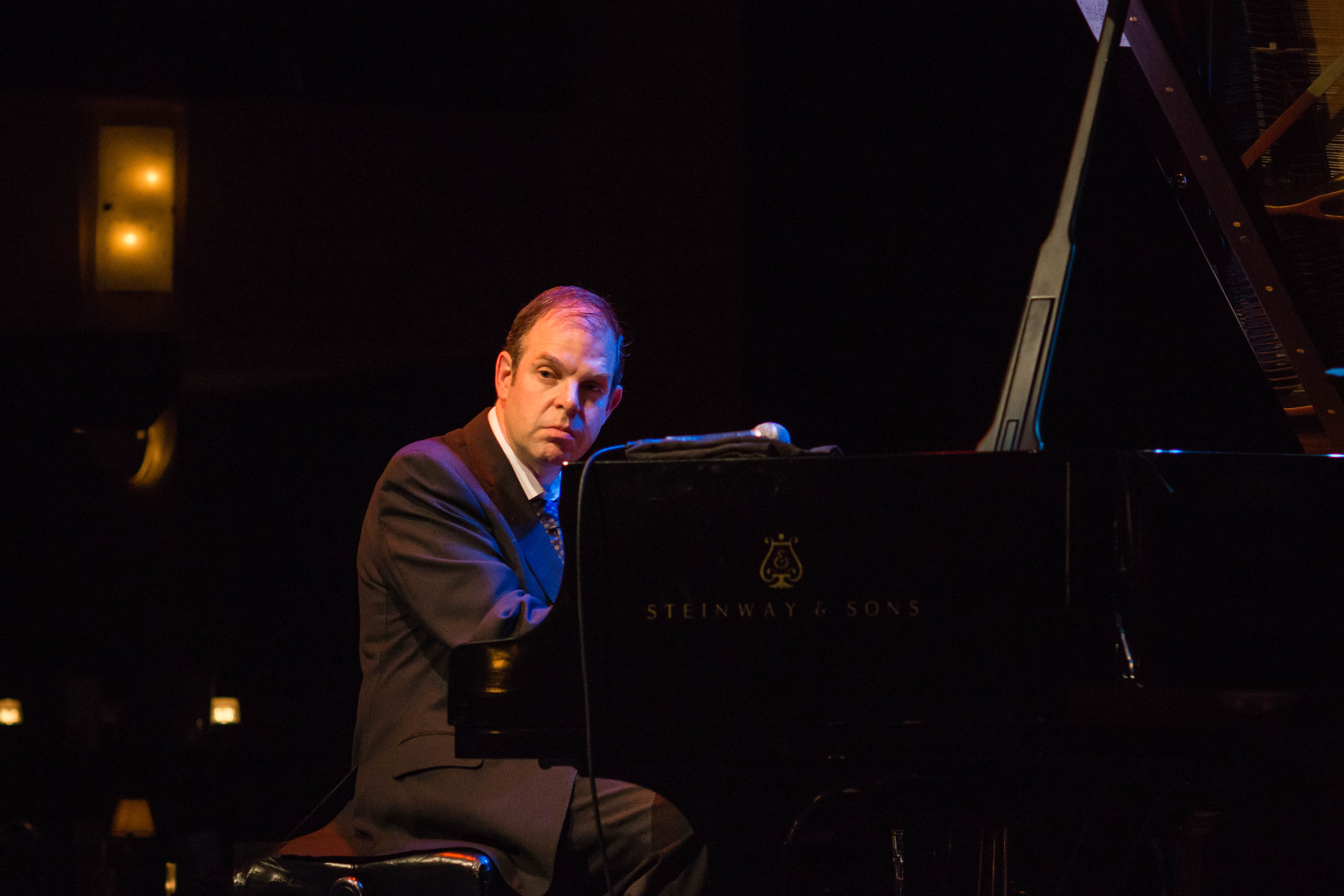

Background information
- Born: William Morrison Charlap; October 15, 1966 (age 60); New York City, New York, U.S.
- Genre: Jazz
- Occupation: Musician
- Instrument: Piano
- Years active: 1989–present
- Labels: Chiaroscuro, Criss Cross, Blue Note, Double-Time, Venus, Impulse!, Blue Note Records
- Website: www.billcharlap.com

William Morrison Charlap (born October 15, 1966, pronounced "Shar-Lap") is an American jazz pianist and educator. He has recorded more than two dozen albums since the 1990s to 2025.

== Early life and education ==
Born in New York City and raised in the Upper East Side, Manhattan on East 51st Street, Bill Charlap is the son of American Broadway composer Moose Charlap and the singer Sandy Stewart. Stewart was a regular on Perry Como's Kraft Music Hall television series and had a hit recording in 1962 with "My Coloring Book". Charlap is a distant cousin of the jazz pianist Dick Hyman.

Charlap began playing piano at the age of three. He studied classical music in addition to jazz.

== Career ==
Early in Charlap's career, he was a member of Gerry Mulligan's band, first recording with it in 1989. He has also worked with Benny Carter, Tony Bennett, Phil Woods, Scott Hamilton, Ron Carter, and others. In 1993, he released his first album under his own name, Along With Me. In the mid-1990s, he was the musical director of Midnight in the Garden of Good and Evil, A Celebration of Johnny Mercer, part of New York's JVC Jazz Festival. In 1995, he joined the Phil Woods Quintet.

In 1997, Charlap first recorded with a trio that included the unrelated musicians Peter Washington (double bass) and Kenny Washington (drums). This trio continued to record and perform live through the 2020s. Charlap has been nominated for multiple instrumental Grammy Awards. Somewhere was nominated for Best Jazz Instrumental Album at the 47th Annual Grammy Awards. Live At The Village Vanguard was nominated in the same category at the 50th Annual Grammy Awards, and Uptown, Downtown at the 60th Annual Grammy Awards.

In addition to the instrumental jazz recordings that he has released, Charlap has frequently recorded with singers. He recorded Love Is Here to Stay (2004) and Something to Remember (2012) with his mother, Sandy Stewart. In 2016, The Silver Lining: The Songs of Jerome Kern, an album featuring Charlap and Tony Bennett, won the award for Best Traditional Pop Vocal Album at the 58th Annual Grammy Awards. As a backing musician, he has recorded with Carol Sloane, Freddie Cole, Barbra Streisand, Diana Krall, and others.

Charlap appears at least twice a year for engagements at jazz clubs, including the Village Vanguard. Since 2001, he has recorded as a member of the studio group New York Trio for the Japanese label Venus Records with bassist Jay Leonhart and drummer Bill Stewart.

Charlap succeeded Dick Hyman as artistic director of New York City's 92nd Street Y Jazz in July six-program series after Hyman's 20th year in 2004. He remained director through 2023. He and his wife, Canadian jazz pianist Renee Rosnes, released an album of piano duets Double Portrait on Blue Note Records/EMI.

In 2008, Charlap became part of The Blue Note 7, a septet formed that year in honor of the 70th anniversary of Blue Note Records. The group recorded an album in 2008, Mosaic, which was released in 2009 on Blue Note/EMI, and toured the United States in promotion of the album from January to April 2009. The group plays the music of Blue Note Records from various artists, with arrangements by members of the band and his wife Renee Rosnes.

In September 2015, Charlap became the Director of Jazz Studies at William Paterson University in Wayne, New Jersey.

== Personal life ==
He married the Canadian jazz pianist Renee Rosnes in New York City on August 25, 2007. He has two daughters from a previous marriage and one stepson from Rosnes’ previous marriage to Billy Drummond.

== Discography ==
=== As leader or co-leader ===
| Year recorded | Title | Label | Year released | Notes |
|---|---|---|---|---|
| 1991–1993 | Along with Me | Chiaroscuro | 1994 | Trio, with Sean Smith & Andy Eulau (bass; separately), Ron Vincent (drums) |
| 1993 | Bill Charlap & Sean Smith | Progressive | 1993 | Co-leader duo, with Sean Smith (bass) |
| 1993 | Piano & Bass | Progressive | 1994 | Co-leader duo, with Sean Smith (bass) |
| 1995 | Michael Moore/Bill Charlap | Concord Jazz | 1995 | Co-leader duo, with Michael Moore (bass) |
| 1995 | Souvenir | Criss Cross Jazz | 1995 | Trio, with Scott Colley (bass), Dennis Mackrel (drums) |
| 1996 | The Gerry Mulligan Songbook | Chiaroscuro | 1997 | A posthumous tribute to Gerry Mulligan (saxophone), with former members Ted Rosenthal (piano), Dean Johnson (bass), Ron Vincent (drums) |
| 1996 | Distant Star | Criss Cross Jazz | 1997 | Trio, with Sean Smith (bass), Bill Stewart (drums) |
| 1997 | All Through the Night | Criss Cross Jazz | 1998 | Trio, with Peter Washington (bass), Kenny Washington (drums) |
| 1998 | 'S Wonderful | Venus | 1999 | Trio, with Peter Washington (bass), Kenny Washington (drums) |
| 2000 | Gift | Ashbrown Productions | 2000 | Quartet, with Mark Hodgson (bass), Stephen Keogh (drums), Louis Stewart (guitar) |
| 2000 | Written in the Stars | Blue Note | 2000 | Trio, with Peter Washington (bass), Kenny Washington (drums) |
| 2000 | Contrasts | Double-Time | 2001 | Co-leader, duo with Jon Gordon (alto sax) |
| 2000 | Stairway to the Stars | Blau | 2022 | Quartet, with Mark Hodgson (bass), Stephen Keogh (drums), Louis Stewart (guitar) |
| 2000 | 2gether | Nagel-Heyer | 2001 | Co-leader, with Warren Vaché (cornet, flugelhorn) |
| 2001 | Artfully | Urban Beauty | 2001 | The European Jazz Piano Trio (Mark Hodgson bass), Stephen Keogh (drums)) |
| 2001 | Blues in the Night | Venus | 2001 | New York Trio (Jay Leonhart (bass), Bill Stewart (drums)) |
| 2001 | Stardust | Blue Note | 2003 | Trio, with Peter Washington (bass), Kenny Washington (drums), plus guests Tony Bennett (vocals), Frank Wess (tenor sax), Jim Hall (guitar), Shirley Horn (vocals) |
| 2002 | The Things We Did Last Summer | Venus | 2002 | New York Trio (Jay Leonhart (bass), Bill Stewart (drums)) |
| 2003 | Somewhere: The Songs of Leonard Bernstein | Blue Note | 2004 | Trio, with Peter Washington (bass), Kenny Washington (drums) |
| 2003 | Love You Madly | Venus | 2003 | New York Trio (Jay Leonhart (bass), Bill Stewart (drums)) |
| 2003 | Live at the Village Vanguard | Blue Note | 2007 | Trio, with Peter Washington (bass), Kenny Washington (drums); in concert |
| 2004 | You Taught My Heart to Sing | HighNote | 2006 | Co-leader, duo with Houston Person (tenor sax) |
| 2004 | Love is Here to Stay | Blue Note | 2005 | Co-leader, with Sandy Stewart (vocals) |
| 2004 | Stairway to the Stars | Venus | 2005 | New York Trio (Jay Leonhart (bass), Bill Stewart (drums)) |
| 2005 | Plays George Gershwin: The American Soul | Blue Note | 2005 | Trio, with Peter Washington (bass), Kenny Washington (drums), plus guests Nicholas Payton (trumpet), Slide Hampton (trombone), Phil Woods (alto sax), Frank Wess (tenor sax) |
| 2005 | Begin the Beguine | Venus | 2006 | New York Trio (Jay Leonhart (bass), Bill Stewart (drums)) |
| 2006 | Thou Swell | Venus | 2007 | New York Trio (Jay Leonhart (bass), Bill Stewart (drums)) |
| 2007 | Always | Venus | 2008 | New York Trio (Jay Leonhart (bass), Bill Stewart (drums)) |
| 2008 | Stardust | Venus | 2008 | New York Trio (Jay Leonhart (bass), Bill Stewart (drums)) with Ken Peplowski |
| 2009 | I'm Old Fashioned | Venus | 2010 | with Peter Bernstein (guitar), Peter Washington (bass) |
| 2009 | Double Portrait | Blue Note | 2010 | Co-leader piano duet, with Renee Rosnes (piano) |
| 2011 | Artfully Vol. 2 | Blau | 2016 | The European Jazz Piano Trio (Mark Hodgson (bass), Stephen Keogh (drums)) |
| 2011 | Something to Remember | Ghostlight | 2012 | Co-leader, with Sandy Stewart (vocals) |
| 2015? | The Silver Lining: The Songs of Jerome Kern | Columbia | 2015 | Co-leader, with Tony Bennett (vocals) with Peter Washington (bass), Kenny Washington (drums) |
| 2015 | Notes from New York | Impulse! | 2016 | Trio, with Peter Washington (bass), Kenny Washington (drums) |
| 2017 | Uptown, Downtown | Impulse! | 2017 | Trio, with Peter Washington (bass), Kenny Washington (drums) |
| 2021 | Street of Dreams | Blue Note | 2021 | Trio, with Peter Washington (bass), Kenny Washington (drums) |
| 2023 | And Then Again | Blue Note | 2024 | Trio, with Peter Washington (bass), Kenny Washington (drums) |
| 2025? | Elemental | Mack Avenue Records | 2025 | Co-leader, with Dee Dee Bridgewater (vocals). Nominated for 2026 Grammy Awards in Best Jazz Vocal Album category. |

=== As a member ===
The Blue Note 7

- Mosaic: A Celebration of Blue Note Records (Blue Note, 2009) – recorded in 2008

Other Blue Note appearances

- Bill Charlap, Elvis Costello, Hank Jones, Joe Lovano, Dianne Reeves, Billy Strayhorn: Lush Life (Blue Note, 2007) – compositions of Billy Strayhorn

=== As sideman ===
With Harry Allen

- Harry Allen Plays Ellington Songs with the Bill Charlap Trio (RCA Victor, 2000) – recorded in 1999
- Blues for Pres and Teddy (Swingbros, 2011)

With Ronnie Bedford

- Tour de West: Where the Beboppers Roam (Ronnie Bedford, 1998)
- Just Friends (Progressive Records, recorded live 1993, released 2002)

With Keter Betts

- Bass Buddies & Blues (Keter Betts Music, 1999)
- Bass, Buddies, Blues & Beauty Too (Keter Betts Music, 1999)
- Pinky's Waltz: Keter Betts, Live At Montpelier! (Jazzmont, 2002)

With Ruby Braff

- You Brought a New Kind of Love (Arbors, 2004)
- Variety is the Spice of Braff (Arbors, 2002; Charlap plays piano on 6 tracks)

With Jon Gordon

- Ask Me Now (Criss Cross Jazz, 1994)
- Spark (Chiaroscuro, 1995)
- Witness (Criss Cross Jazz, 1996)
- Evolution (ArtistShare, 2009)

With Conrad Herwig

- Heart of Darkness (Criss Cross, 1998)
- Hieroglyphica (Criss Cross Jazz, 2001)

With Jay Leonhart

- With His Friends (Live At Fat Tuesday's May 13-15, 1993) (DRG Records, 1993)
- Great Duets (Chiaroscuro, 1999)

With Carol Sloane

- When I Look in Your Eyes (Concord Jazz, 1994)
- The Songs Carmen Sang (Concord Jazz, 1995, Phil Woods plays on 7 tracks)
- The Songs Sinatra Sang (Concord Jazz, 1996, with Frank Wess)
- The Songs Ella & Louis Sang (Concord Jazz, 1997, with Clark Terry)

With Sean Smith

- LIVE! (Chiaroscuro, 1999)
- Poise (Ambient Records, 2001)

With Byron Stripling

- Stripling Now! (Nagel–Heyer Records, 1999) – recorded 1998
- Byron, Get One Free... (Nagel–Heyer, 2001)

With Phil Woods

- 1996: Mile High Jazz: Live in Denver (Concord Jazz, 1996)
- 1996: Astor & Elis (Chesky Records, 1996)
- 1996: Live 1996 (Revelation, 1998)
- 1997: Chasin' the Bird (Venus, 1998)
- 1997: Celebration (Concord Jazz, 1997))
- 2000: Voyage with the Bill Charlap Trio at the Floating Jazz Festival Aboard the QE2 (Chiaroscuro, 2001)
- 2002: The Thrill is Gone with strings (Venus, 2003)
- 2002: The Great American Songbook, Volumes 1 & 2 (Kind of Blue, 2006)
- 2004: This is How I Feel About Quincy (Jazzed Media, 2004)
- 2008: Ballads & Blues (Venus Records, 2009)

With others

- Tony Bennett & Diana Krall, Love Is Here to Stay (Verve/Columbia, 2018)
- Tony Bennett, Duets: An American Classic (Columbia, 2006; Charlap plays piano on one track)
- Gene Bertoncini, Gene Bertoncini with Bill Charlap and Sean Smith (Chiaroscuro, 1998)
- John Burr, In My Own Words (Cymekob, 1996)
- Ann Hampton Callaway, Easy Living (Sin-Drome Records, 1999; Charlap plays on 5 tracks)
- Freddy Cole, Music Maestro Please (HighNote Records, 2007)
- Dena DeRose, Love's Holiday (Sharp Nine, 2002; Charlap plays piano on one track)
- Trudy Desmond, Make Me Rainbows (Koch, 1995)
- Johnny Frigo, Johnny Frigo's DNA Exposed! (Arbors, 2001)
- Steve Gilmore, Reflections In The Night (JazzMania Records, 1996)
- Scott Hamilton, Back to New York (Concord Jazz, 2005)
- Mary Cleere Haran, This Funny World: Mary Cleere Haran Sings Lyrics by Hart (Concord Theatricals, 1994; Charlap plays piano on 7 tracks)
- Barbara Lea / Bob Dorough / Dick Sudhalter, Hoagy's Children - Songs Of Hoagy Carmichael Volume One and Volume Two (Audiophile, 1994)
- Kevin Lutke, Fallen Wood (Ampersand Records, 1996)
- Brian Lynch, Brian Lynch Meets Bill Charlap (Sharp Nine, 2003)
- Wynton Marsalis, The Lincoln Center Jazz Orchestra With Wynton Marsalis – Cast Of Cats (DMX Music, 2004) – recorded 2003
- Marian McPartland, An NPR Jazz Christmas With Marian McPartland And Friends II (NPR Classics, 2002)
- Marian McPartland, Marian McPartland & Friends: 85 Candles, Live in New York (Concord Jazz, 2005; Charlap plays piano on 3 tracks)
- Marian McPartland, An NPR Jazz Christmas With Marian McPartland And Friends III (NPR Classics, 2006)
- Gerry Mulligan, Lonesome Boulevard (Verve, 1990)
- Houston Person, The Art and Soul of Houston Person (HighNote, 2008; Charlap plays piano on 3 tracks)
- Tim Ries, The Rolling Stones Project (Concord, 2005)
- the Joe Roccisano Orchestra, Leave Your Mind Behind (Landmark, 1995)
- Joe Roccisano, Nonet (Double-Time Records, 1998) – recorded in 1997
- Charles Russo, Clarinet Alla Cinema (Premier Recordings, 1998)
- Randy Sandke, Trumpet After Dark (Evening Star, 2005)
- Gary Smulyan, Blue Suite (Criss Cross Jazz, 1999)
- Marvin Stamm, Mystery Man (MusicMasters, 1993)
- Steely Dan, Everything Must Go (Reprise, 2003; Charlap plays Fender Rhodes on one track and acoustic piano on another)
- Grant Stewart, Grant Stewart + 4 (VideoArts, 2005) – recorded in 2004
- Sandy Stewart, Sandy Stewart and Family (Cabaret, 1994; Charlap is arranger and plays piano) - recorded in 1993
- Barbra Streisand, Love Is the Answer (album) (Columbia, 2009; Charlap plays only on a bonus track: "You Must Believe in Spring")
- Harvie S, Too Late Now (Ward, 2010) - recorded in 1988
- Warren Vaché, Dream Dancing (Arbors, 2004) – recorded in 2003
- Paula West, Come What May (Hi Horse, 2001; Charlap plays piano on 3 tracks)
- Joe Wilder, Among Friends (Evening Star, 2003)
- David Yazbek, Dirty Rotten Scoundrels (musical) (Ghostlight Records, 2005)
