= Ferit Odman =

Turkish jazz drummer

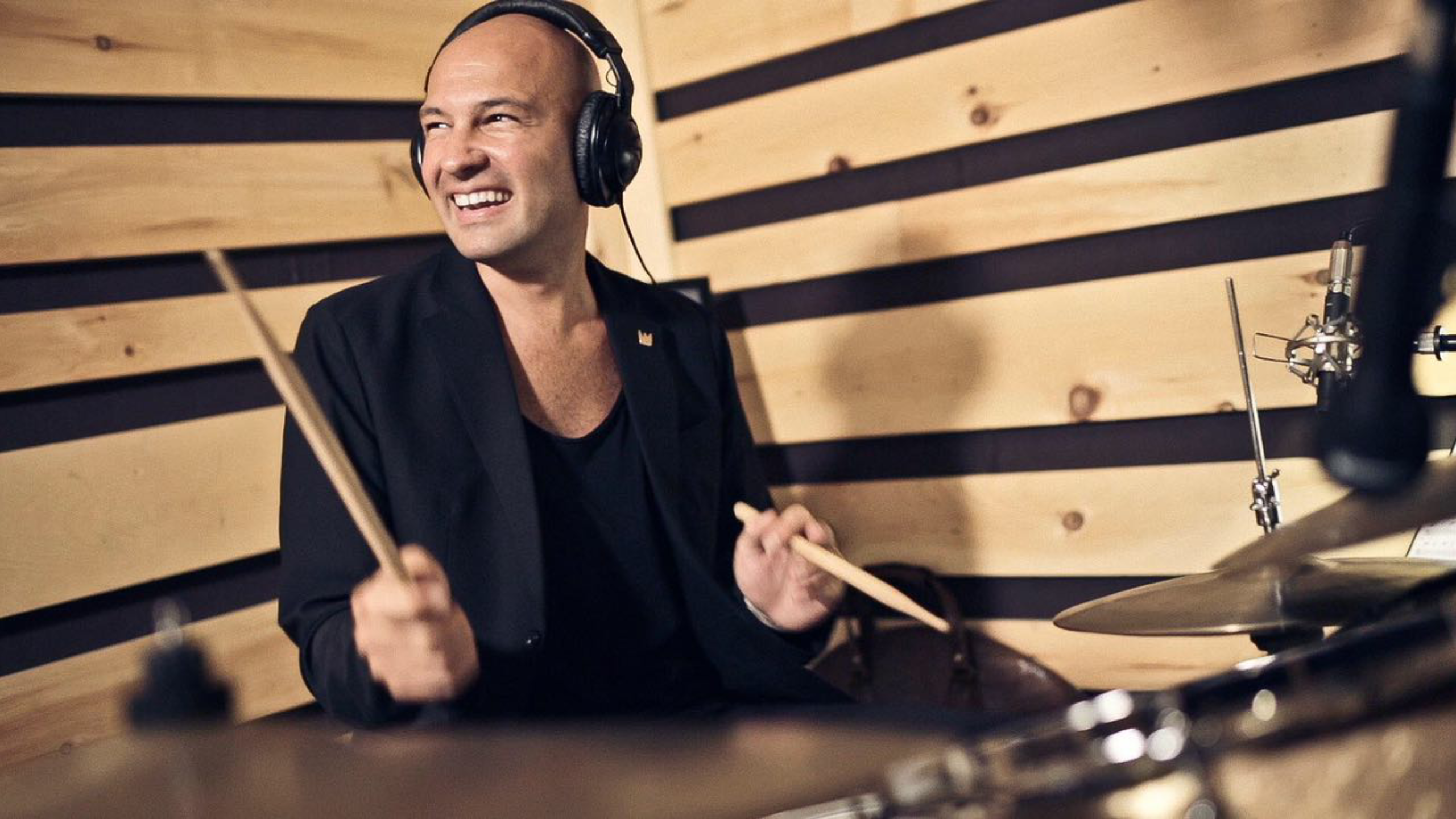
- Ferit Odman

Background information
- Born: July 7, 1982 (age 43); Bursa, Turkey
- Origin: Istanbul, Turkey
- Genres: Jazz
- Occupations: Musician, composer
- Instrument: Drums
- Years active: 2000–present
- Label: Equinox
- Website: www.feritodman.com

Ferit Odman is a jazz drummer based in Istanbul, Turkey.

== Education ==
Odman started his music studies in Sweden as an AFS exchange student in 1999, then received a full scholarship to Istanbul Bilgi University in 2001, where he obtained his B.A. in Music. In 2004, he attended workshops at the School for Improvisation in New York City. He was given a Fulbright Scholarship to study at William Paterson University from 2006 to 2008.

== Performing career ==
Odman began his professional career in 2000 at the age of eighteen. He spent two years playing in New York City while pursuing his graduate degree, performing and recording with Brian Lynch, Vincent Herring, Peter Washington, Benny Golson, Jacky Terrasson, Mike Moreno, Sean Jones, Ernie Watts, Stefano di Battista, Bertha Hope, Jim Rotondi, Alan Broadbent, Alex Sipiagin, and David Berkman. Odman also played with a number of vocalists, including Sheila Jordan, Kevin Mahogany, Allan Harris, Mark Murphy, Deborah Davis, Ive Mendes, and Hilary Kole. He has played at many New York City clubs and festivals.

Since returning to Istanbul, Odman has been a mainstay on the Turkish jazz scene, performing and recording with Kerem Görsev and TRT (Turkish Radio Television) Big Band, among others. He was invited to a number of international festivals as a bandleader, including the North Sea Jazz Festival, the Istanbul Jazz Festival, the Prishtina Jazz Festival in Kosovo; the International Ankara Jazz Festival, and the Rabobank Amersfoort Jazz Festival in the Netherlands.

Odman was featured in the May 2011 issue of Jazz Inside magazine.

== Recording career ==
In 2010, he released Nommo, featuring trumpeter Brian Lynch, saxophonist Vincent Herring, pianist Burak Bedikyan and bassist Peter Washington. In 2011, he released Autumn In New York, featuring trumpeter Terell Stafford, saxophonist Vincent Herring, pianist Anthony Wonsey and bassist Peter Washington. In 2016, he released an all analog (AAA) Vinyl Dameronia With Strings, which is a tribute to Tadd Dameron with six strings and featuring trumpeter Terell Stafford, pianist Danny Grissett and bassist Peter Washington. Down beat magazine gave four stars to Dameronia with Strings, four stars to Autumn in New York, and three and a half stars to Nommo.

== Awards and honors ==
- 2012 TCF (Turkish Cultural Foundation) Cultural Exchange Fellowship
- 2014 Rotary Professional Excellence Award (District 2440)

== Discography ==
=== As leader ===
- Nommo (Equinox, 2010)
- Autumn in New York (Equinox, 2011)
- Dameronia with Strings (Equinox, 2015)
- The Vinyl Collection (Equinox, 2017)

=== As a sideman ===
- Kenan Doğulu, İhtimaller (2016 Doğulu Productions)
- Fatih Erkoç, True Love (2016 Esen Elektronik)
- Sinan Isik, Patience (2016)
- Kerem Görsev Trio & Ernie Watts, Four Days (2015 Rec Jazz)
- Bulut Gülen, Su (2015 A.K. Müzik)
- Ozan Musluoglu, My Best Friends Are Vocalists (2015 Sony Music Entertainment Turkey)
- Kerem Görsev Trio & Ernie Watts, Emirgan (2014 Rec Jazz)
- Kęstutis Vaiginis, Lights Of Darkness (2014 KV)
- Kerem Görsev & City of Prague Philharmonic Orchestra, To Bill Evans (2013 Rec Jazz)
- Asena Akan, Istanbul'un Izleri (2013 Kalan)
- Ozan Musluoglu, My Best Friends Are Pianists (2012 Equinox Music & Entertainment)
- Önder Focan, Songbook (2012 Equinox Music & Entertainment)
- Kerem Görsev & London Philharmonia Orchestra, Therapy (2011 Rec Jazz)
- Sezen Aksu, Öptüm (2011 SN Music)
- Uraz Kıvaner, Pieces (2011 Rec Jazz)
- Ayhan Sicimoğlu, En Estambul (2011 IMM)
- Joy Voeth, I Wish You Love (2010 JoyVoeth)
- Jehan Barbur, Hayat (2010 ADA Müzik)
- Danielle Eva, Road and Moon (2010 Devour Music)
- Ülkem Özsezen, Ghost’s Note (2010 San Grafik)
- Jef Giansily, Sketches (2009 Circle)
- Kerem Görsev, Diversion (2009 Rec Jazz)
- Ozan Musluoglu, Coincidence (2009 Rec Jazz)
- Önder Focan Group, Swing A La Turc (2007 Kalan Music)
- SPIN, Ilk (2006 Aura Records)
- Donovan Mixon, The Dance of Life (2004 DMC-Jazz)
