= Fatih Erkoç =

Turkish singer and composer

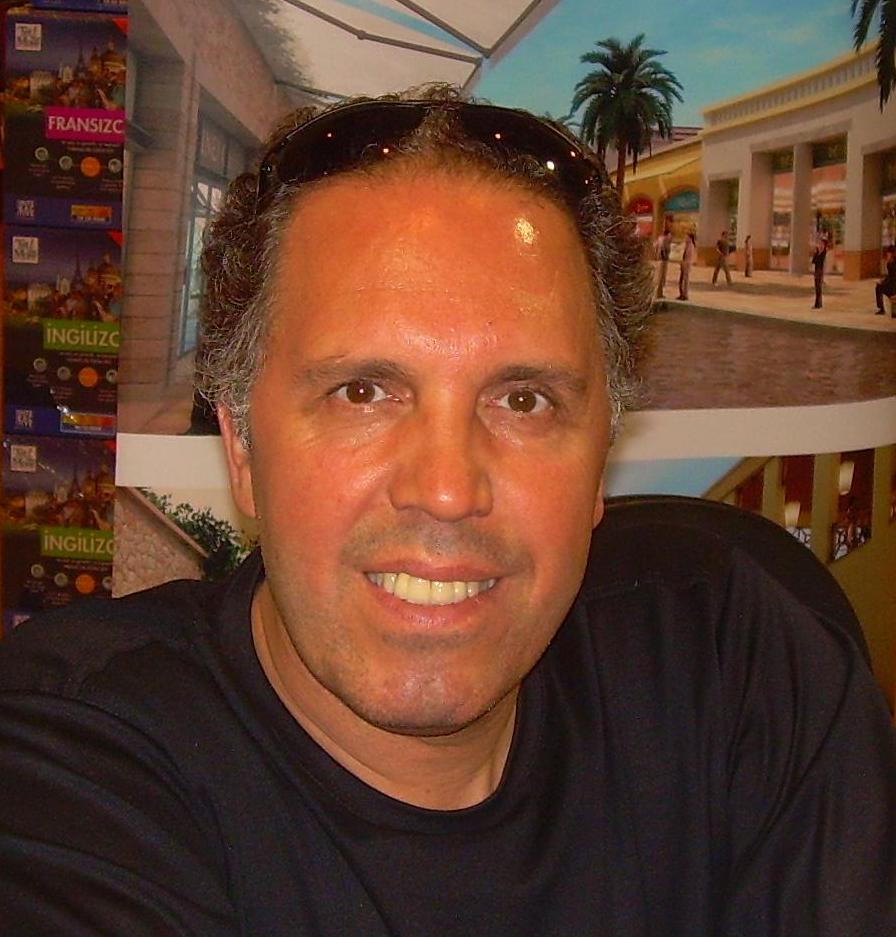
- Fatih Erkoç

Background information
- Born: Mehmet Fatih Erkoç; 7 April 1953 (age 73)
- Origin: Istanbul, Turkey
- Genres: Jazz, Pop
- Occupation: Singer-songwriter
- Instruments: Vocals, guitar, piano, flute, trombone, trumpet, violin, oud, bağlama, double bass
- Years active: 1970–present
- Website: Official Website

Mehmet Fatih Erkoç (born 7 April 1953) is a Turkish jazz and pop music singer, multi-instrumentalist and composer.

== Biography ==
Fatih Erkoç is the son of Hasan Erkoç, an oud musician. Hasan gave a violin to his son when Fatih was three years old. Fatih studied at Istanbul Municipality Conservatory. He played trombone and worked with Istanbul State Symphony Orchestra. Then he went to Norway. He returned to Turkey in 1986. His first album is Nihayet. He joined Kuşadası Golden Piegon Song Contest and won. His last album was Kör Randevu. Elveda Ey Gençlik in this album is written by Hasan Erkoç. He joined the Lütfü Kırdar Concert on 24 February 2009. He was a part of the musicians in My Best Friends Are Vocalists, the latest album of the Turkish jazz musician Ozan Musluoğlu, with his original composition 'As Long As You're Here With Me'. After the endless demands from the jazz audience in Turkey, he released True Love together with Ferit Odman on drums, Ercüment Orkut on piano and Kağan Yıldız on double bass

== Albums ==
- Yol Verin A Dostlar (June 1987)
- Ellerim Bomboş (March 1992)
- Penceremden Gökyüzüne (February 1993)
- Sana Deliyim (January 1994)
- Kardelen (June 1996)
- Korkmazdım REMIX (May 1998)
- Vefasız (August 1999)
- Fatih Erkoç Klasikleri (March 2002)
- Beklenen (September 2004)
- Kör Randevu (March 2007)
- Fatih Erkoç & Kerem Görsev Trio – The Lady From İstanbul (2019)
- Seher Yeli (2010)
- Yanında Her Kimse (2011)
- Babamdan Miras (2012)
- Çocuk Şarkıları (2014)
- True Love (2016)
- 5. Boyut (2018)
