= Tony Bennett Celebrates 90 =

Live album by Tony Bennett and various artists
- Released: December 16, 2016
- Recorded: July 20 (Billy Joel), September 15, 2016
- Venue: Radio City Music Hall, Madison Square Garden, Colosseum at Caesar's Palace
- Genre: Jazz
- Length: 69:59
- Label: Columbia
- Producer: Dae Bennett

Tony Bennett chronology
The Silver Lining: The Songs of Jerome Kern (2015)	Tony Bennett Celebrates 90 (2016)	Love Is Here to Stay (2018)

Tony Bennett Celebrates 90 is an album by Tony Bennett, released by Columbia Records on December 16, 2016. Guest artists include Andrea Bocelli, Michael Bublé, Billy Joel, Elton John, Diana Krall, Lady Gaga, k.d. lang, Leslie Odom Jr., Kevin Spacey, Rufus Wainwright, and Stevie Wonder. The record won the Grammy Award for Best Traditional Pop Vocal Album at the 60th Grammy Awards.

== Follow-up special ==
The album was followed by the television special Tony Bennett Celebrates 90: The Best Is Yet to Come, which aired on NBC on December 20, 2016. The special included appearances by Alec Baldwin, Steve Buscemi, Robert De Niro, John McEnroe, Wynton Marsalis, and Bruce Willis. It was executive produced by Danny Bennett, directed by Jerry Foley, with production and lighting design by LeRoy Bennett.

== Track listing ==
No.	Title	Lyrics	Music	Performer(s)	Length
1.	"The Lady Is a Tramp"	Lorenz Hart	Richard Rodgers	Lady Gaga	3:26
2.	"The Good Life"	Jack Reardon	Sacha Distel	Michael Bublé	3:19
3.	"Ave María"	Franz Schubert; Phillip Keveren	Schubert; Keveren	Andrea Bocelli	5:21
4.	"The Very Thought of You / If I Ruled the World"	Ray Noble; Leslie Bricusse; Cyril Ornadel	Noble; Bricusse; Ornadel	Kevin Spacey	4:10
5.	"I've Got the World on a String"	Ted Koehler	Harold Arlen	Diana Krall	3:31
6.	"New York State of Mind"	Billy Joel	Joel	Tony Bennett and Joel	6:40
7.	"I Can't Give You Anything but Love"	Dorothy Fields	Jimmy McHugh	Rufus Wainwright	6:20
8.	"A Kiss to Build a Dream On"	Oscar Hammerstein II; Harry Ruby; Bert Kalmar	Hammerstein; Ruby; Kalmar	k.d. lang	3:37
9.	"Visions"	Stevie Wonder	Wonder	Wonder	4:22
10.	"La Vie en rose"	Édith Piaf; Mack David; Louiguy	Piaf; David; Louiguy	Lady Gaga	3:53
11.	"Can You Feel the Love Tonight"	Tim Rice	Elton John	John	4:01
12.	"Autumn Leaves"	Johnny Mercer	Joseph Kosma	Leslie Odom Jr.	3:04
13.	"Who Cares?"	Ira Gershwin	George Gershwin	Bennett	3:00
14.	"The Best Is Yet to Come"	Carolyn Leigh	Cy Coleman	Bennett	2:43
15.	"I Left My Heart in San Francisco"	Douglas Cross	George C. Cory Jr.	Bennett	2:20
16.	"I Got Rhythm"	I. Gershwin	G. Gershwin	Bennett	2:24
17.	"How Do You Keep the Music Playing?"	Alan Bergman; Marilyn Bergman	Michel Legrand	Bennett	4:27
18.	"Happy Birthday"	Wonder	Wonder	Wonder	3:13

== Charts ==
Chart (2016)	Peak position
New Zealand Heatseekers Albums (RMNZ)	10
US Billboard 200	35
