= Overseas (album) =

Studio album by Tommy Flanagan
- Released: 1958
- Recorded: August 15, 1957
- Genre: Jazz
- Length: 40:38
- Label: Prestige
- Producer: Bob Weinstock

Tommy Flanagan chronology
Overseas (1958)	The Cats (1957)

Overseas is an album by pianist Tommy Flanagan, recorded with bassist Wilbur Little and drummer Elvin Jones in 1957. It was Flanagan's debut album as a leader.

== Recording and music ==
Pianist Tommy Flanagan was touring Europe as part of trombonist J. J. Johnson's band in 1957 when he was given the chance to lead a recording session for the first time. From Johnson's touring group, Flanagan hired Little and Jones for the session, which took place in Stockholm on August 15. Six of the album's nine pieces were Flanagan originals.

Flanagan rerecorded five of the album's selections on his 1996 trio album Sea Changes, his final studio recording as a leader. These were his original compositions "Beat's Up", "Dalarna", "Eclypso", and "Verdandi", as well as Charlie Parker's "Relaxin' at Camarillo".

== Releases and reception ==
Professional ratings
Review scores
Source	Rating
AllMusic	4/5 stars
The Penguin Guide to Jazz	3.5/4 stars

Overseas was released by Prestige Records. Very similar selections of tracks were also released as Tommy Flanagan Trio by Metronome and as Trio Overseas by Prestige. All of the tracks from the session were later issued by DIW as The Complete Overseas.

The Penguin Guide to Jazz complimented Flanagan's touch and "trim melodic ideas".

== Track listing ==
All pieces by Tommy Flanagan unless otherwise noted.

1. "Relaxin' at Camarillo" (Charlie Parker) – 3:21
2. "Chelsea Bridge" (Billy Strayhorn) – 3:46
3. "Eclypso" – 6:00
4. "Beat's Up" – 4:22
5. "Skål Brothers" – 2:33
6. "Little Rock" – 7:08
7. "Verdandi" – 2:15
8. "Dalarna" – 4:44
9. "Willow Weep for Me" (Ann Ronell) – 6:29

Bonus tracks on CD reissue:

10. "Dalarna" [Take 2] – 4:36
11. "Verdandi" [Take 2] – 2:11
12. "Willow Weep for Me" [Take 1] – 6:17

August 15, 1957, at Metronome Studio, Stockholm

== Personnel ==
- Tommy Flanagan – piano
- Wilbur Little – bass
- Elvin Jones – drums
