= Love Is Here to Stay (album) =

Studio album by Tony Bennett and Diana Krall
- Released: September 14, 2018
- Studio: Avatar (New York, New York); Electric Lady (New York, New York)
- Genre: Jazz
- Length: 36:46
- Label: Verve; Columbia
- Producer: Dae Bennett; Bill Charlap

Tony Bennett chronology
Tony Bennett Celebrates 90 (2016)	Love Is Here to Stay (2018)	Love for Sale (2021)

Diana Krall chronology
Turn Up the Quiet (2017)	Love Is Here to Stay (2018)	This Dream of You (2020)

Love Is Here to Stay is a collaborative studio album by American singer Tony Bennett and Canadian singer and pianist Diana Krall. It was released on September 14, 2018, by Verve Records and Columbia Records. The album features the New York–based jazz group the Bill Charlap Trio. An exclusive CD edition containing two bonus tracks was released at Target, while a red-colored opaque vinyl of the album was made available exclusively through Barnes & Noble.

== Background ==
All songs in the album are from the Great American Songbook and were composed by George Gershwin, with lyrics by Ira Gershwin. Bennett first recorded "Fascinating Rhythm" in 1949. By recording the song again for Love Is Here to Stay, he received the Guinness World Records title for "longest time between the release of an original recording and a re-recording of the same single by the same artist." The time span is 68 years and 342 days, according to the Guinness adjudicator who presided over the record-setting. Bennett and Krall have been friends for more than two decades. Krall previously participated in recording two Bennett's albums, Duets: An American Classic (2006) and Playin' with My Friends: Bennett Sings the Blues (2001). This record is their first full-length project together.

== Critical reception ==
Professional ratings
Review scores
Source	Rating
AllMusic	3.5/5 stars
Glide Magazine	8/10 stars
Jazz Forum	4/5 stars
Spectrum Culture	3.5/5 stars
The Spill Magazine	4.5/5 stars
The Times	4/5 stars

Chris Pearson of The Times gave the album four stars out of five, commenting, "Tony Bennett's admirers are by now resigned to him making duet albums, even if he works best solo. This example is more palatable than most since it pairs him with Diana Krall, among the few younger singers to share his deep appreciation of the Great American Songbook. Moreover they are backed by the trio of the pianist Bill Charlap..." John Paul of Spectrum Culture mentioned, "There is nothing on Love Is Here to Stay that will rewrite the legacy of either artist—they've both been better before and Bennett's range isn't quite what it once was (but whose is after some 70 years in the business?) But it's nonetheless an enjoyable pairing of two of the classiest jazz vocalists still working and, more importantly, still clearly enjoying themselves in the process. We should all hope to be so active should we find ourselves becoming nonagenarians".

Stephen Thomas Erlewine of AllMusic stated, "In the Bill Charlap Trio, the pair have empathetic support, keeping the proceedings both light and lush, helping to turn this album into a charming testament to endurance—endurance of the Gershwin catalog, the collaboration between Krall and Bennett, and, especially, how Tony Bennett can still sound completely committed to songs he's spent decades singing". Bobby Reed of DownBeat wrote, "Bennett and Krall offer 10 delightful duets [...] and each vocalist delivers one solo rendition; his is 'Who Cares?' and hers is 'But Not For Me.' Just as salt and pepper can work together in a recipe, Bennett's authoritative vocals and Krall's more delicate delivery complement each other, and several tunes conclude with a delicious bit of unison singing". Lee Mergner of JazzTimes commented, "With the release of Love Is Here to Stay, an exquisite duet album with Diana Krall, Bennett has further cemented his legacy as one of the greatest singers in American music."

== Track listing ==
All lyrics are written by Ira Gershwin, except where noted; all music is composed by George Gershwin.

No.	Title	Lyrics	Length
1.	"'S Wonderful"		2:52
2.	"My One and Only"		2:50
3.	"But Not for Me" (Diana Krall solo)		3:07
4.	"Nice Work If You Can Get It"		2:45
5.	"Love Is Here to Stay"		4:28
6.	"I Got Rhythm"		2:00
7.	"Somebody Loves Me"	George DeSylva; Ballard MacDonald	3:42
8.	"Do It Again"	DeSylva	2:55
9.	"I've Got a Crush on You"		4:00
10.	"Fascinating Rhythm"		2:43
11.	"They Can't Take That Away from Me"		3:25
12.	"Who Cares?" (Tony Bennett solo)		1:59
Total length:			36:46

Target exclusive edition bonus tracks
No.	Title	Length
13.	"How Long Has This Been Going On" (Diana Krall solo)	4:13
14.	"Oh, Lady Be Good!" (Tony Bennett solo)	1:48
Total length:		42:47

European deluxe edition and Japanese edition bonus tracks
No.	Title	Length
13.	"How Long Has This Been Going On" (Diana Krall solo)	4:13
14.	"A Foggy Day" (Tony Bennett solo)	2:27
Total length:		43:26

Japanese deluxe edition bonus DVD
No.	Title	Length
1.	"Fascinating Rhythm"	2:42
2.	"Nice Work If You Can Get It"	2:45
3.	"Love Is Here to Stay"	4:28
Total length:		9:55

== Personnel ==
Credits adapted from the liner notes of Love Is Here to Stay.

=== Musicians ===
- Tony Bennett – vocals (tracks 1, 2, 4–12)
- Diana Krall – vocals (tracks 1–11); arrangement (track 3)
- The Bill Charlap Trio
  - Bill Charlap – piano, arrangement (all tracks)
  - Peter Washington – bass (tracks 1, 2, 4–12)
  - Kenny Washington – drums (tracks 1, 2, 4–12)

=== Technical ===
- Dae Bennett – production, mixing
- Bill Charlap – production
- Nate Odden – engineering assistance
- Billy Cumella – engineering assistance
- Greg Calbi – mastering

=== Artwork ===
- Josh Cheuse – creative direction
- Mark Seliger – photography
- Coco Shinomiya – design

== Charts ==
=== Weekly charts ===
Chart (2018)	Peak position
Australian Albums (ARIA)	30
Australian Jazz & Blues Albums (ARIA)	1
Austrian Albums (Ö3 Austria)	4
Belgian Albums (Ultratop Flanders)	22
Belgian Albums (Ultratop Wallonia)	17
Canadian Albums (Billboard)	19
Czech Albums (ČNS IFPI)	14
Dutch Albums (Album Top 100)	71
French Albums (SNEP)	40
German Albums (Offizielle Top 100)	20
Greek Albums (IFPI)	11
Hungarian Albums (MAHASZ)	35
Italian Albums (FIMI)	19
Japan Hot Albums (Billboard Japan)	40
Japanese Albums (Oricon)	29
Polish Albums (ZPAV)	13
Portuguese Albums (AFP)	1
Scottish Albums (OCC)	25
South Korean Albums (Gaon)	93
Spanish Albums (PROMUSICAE)	10
Swiss Albums (Schweizer Hitparade)	12
Swedish Jazz Albums (Sverigetopplistan)	1
UK Albums (OCC)	33
UK Jazz & Blues Albums (OCC)	1
US Billboard 200	11
US Top Jazz Albums (Billboard)	1

=== Year-end charts ===
Chart (2018)	Position
Australian Jazz & Blues Albums (ARIA)	5
US Top Jazz Albums (Billboard)	1

Chart (2019)	Position
Australian Jazz & Blues Albums (ARIA)	24
US Top Jazz Albums (Billboard)	2

== Certifications ==
Region	Certification	Certified units/sales
Poland (ZPAV)	Platinum	10,000^{‡}
^{‡} Sales+streaming figures based on certification alone.
