= Burak Bedikyan =

Jazz pianist and composer

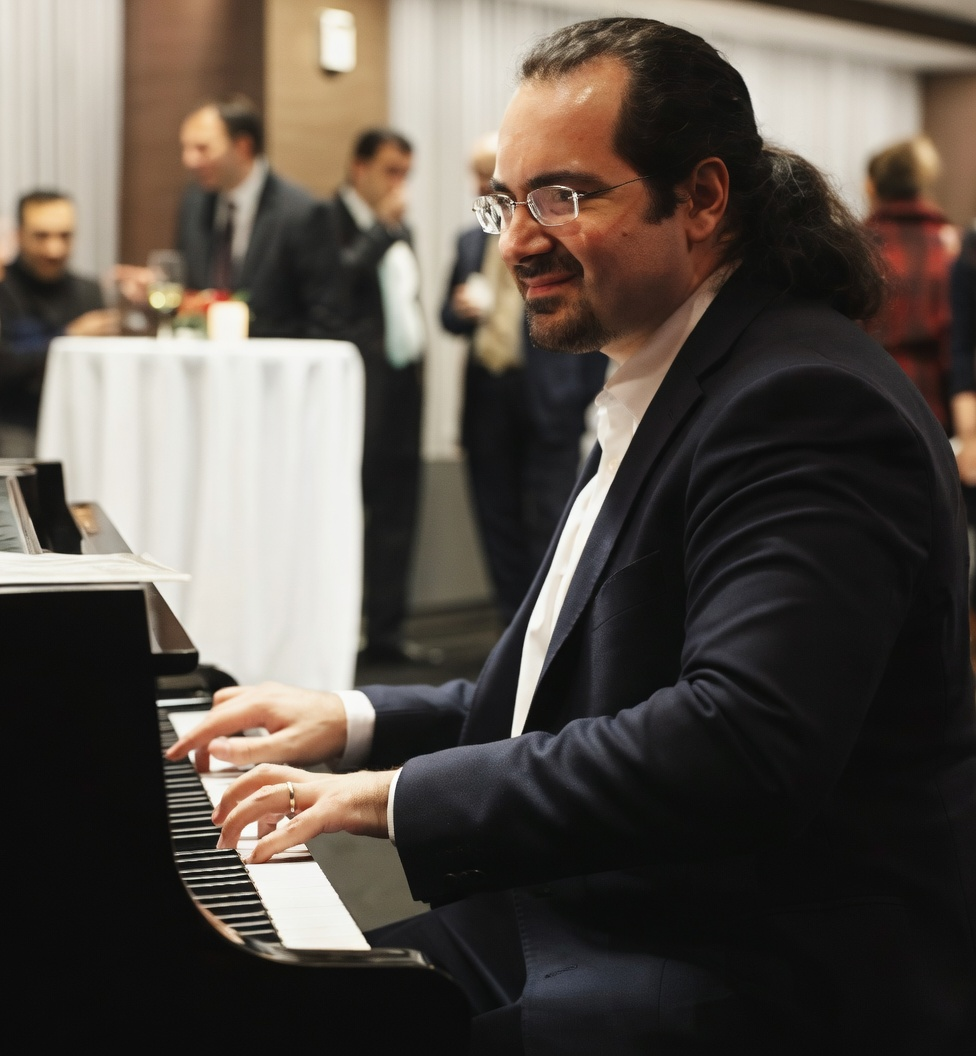
- Burak Bedikyan performing.

Background information
- Born: Istanbul, Turkey
- Genre: Jazz\contemporary jazz
- Occupations: Jazz pianist, composer, educator
- Instrument: Piano
- Years active: 1996–present
- Label: SteepleChase
- Website: https://burak-bedikyan.com/

Burak Bedikyan (born February 6, 1978) is a jazz pianist, composer, educator, multi-instrumentalist, and recording artist from Turkey of Armenian descent, based in New Jersey, United States.

== Early life and education ==
Bedikyan was raised in a family where music was an integral part of everyday life. His parents, although not professional musicians, encouraged his early interest in music by exposing him to classical music, jazz, rock, and traditional vocal music.

He began studying classical piano at the age of seven. During his childhood and adolescence, he studied with several teachers in Turkey, including Ayla Saydam, Mari Barsamyan, and Ali Darmar.

While attending Saint Benoît French High School in Istanbul, he developed an interest in jazz.

In 1996, he began studying modern harmony, composition, and jazz improvisation with Turkish pianist and composer Aydın Esen. That same year, he entered Marmara University Faculty of Economic and Administrative Sciences, where he continued his university studies while performing in pop and rock settings with leading Turkish popular musicians. During this period, he was also awarded a scholarship to Berklee College of Music.

In 2002, Bedikyan received a full merit scholarship to Istanbul Bilgi University, where he continued his formal music education and studied with musicians including Donovan Mixon, Ricky Ford, Can Kozlu, Ali Perret, Tuna Ötenel, and İmer Demirer.

== Career ==
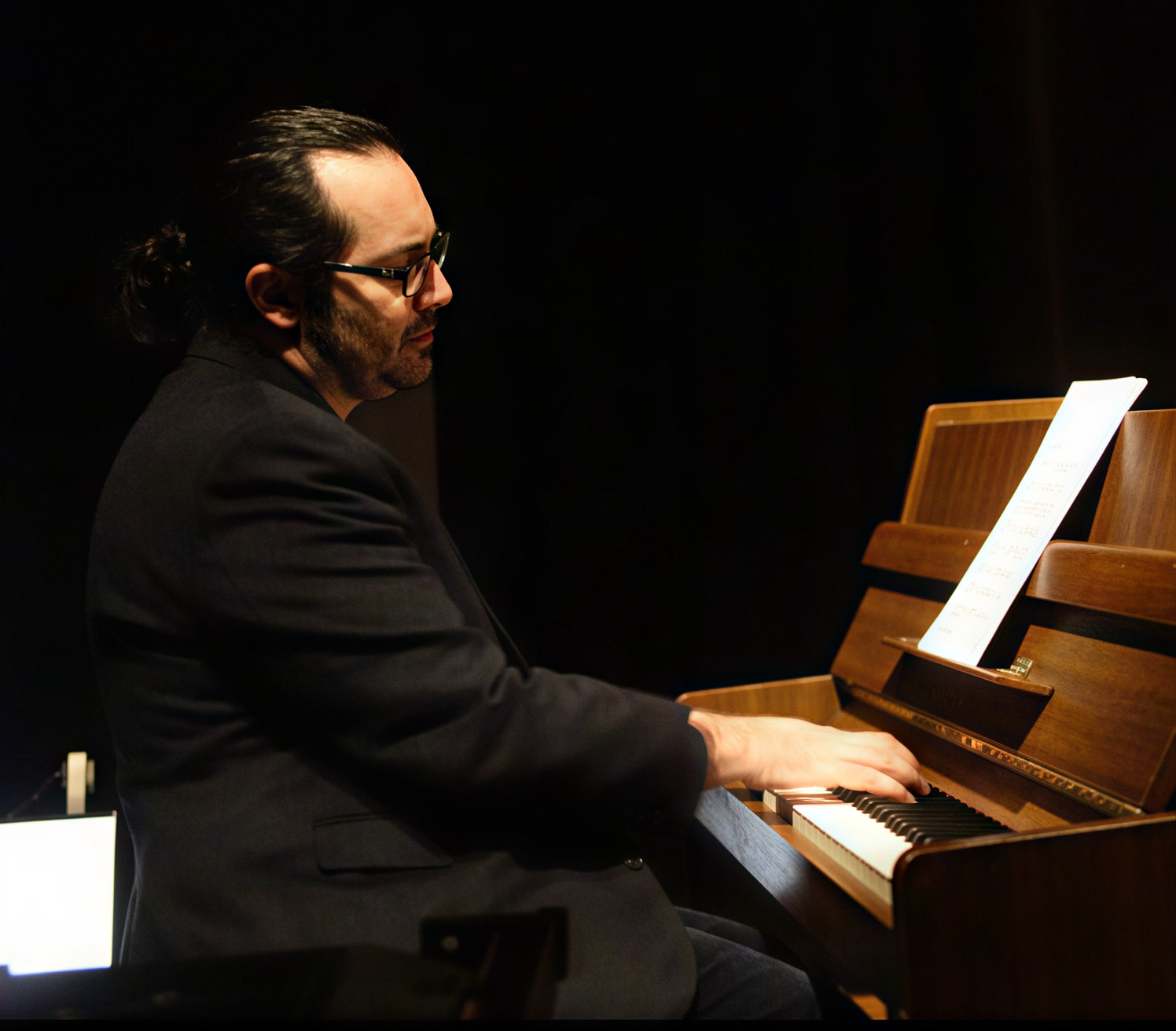
Burak Bedikyan performing live.

By the early 2000s, Bedikyan had established himself as one of the leading jazz pianists of his generation in Turkey. As both a bandleader and sideman, he performed extensively with Turkish, American, and European musicians at clubs, concert halls, and jazz festivals. His appearances included repeated performances at the Istanbul International Jazz Festival, the Akbank Jazz Festival, and the Ankara Jazz Festival, among others. In 2007, he performed with Wynton Marsalis as a member of the festival house band at the Istanbul International Jazz Festival.

His international recording career began with Circle of Life (2013), recorded in New York with Chris Potter, Peter Washington, and Bill Stewart and released by SteepleChase Records. He continued his collaboration with the Danish label with Leap of Faith (2015), Awakening (2016), New Beginning (2018), Istanbul Junction (2019), and the solo debut album Introspection (2021).

Alongside his local bands and his American recording projects, Bedikyan developed a long-standing artistic partnership with American saxophonist/composer Andy Middleton. Originally formed as the Burak Bedikyan European Quartet, the ensemble later evolved into Hybrid 4tet, featuring Middleton, Johannes Strasser, Joris Dudli, and Bedikyan. The group toured throughout Europe and released the live album Hybrid 4tet - Live at Amsec through Alessa Records.

Before relocating permanently to the United States, Bedikyan made regular visits to New York for recording sessions and concert engagements. After settling in New Jersey in 2017, he became an active participant in the New York jazz scene, performing regularly as both a bandleader and sideman at venues such as Cornelia Street Cafe, 55 Bar, ShapeShifter Lab, Rockwood Music Hall, Drom, Nublu, Trumpets Jazz Club, Triad Theater, Club 75, Cafe Noctambulo, Fat Cat, and other jazz venues throughout New York City and the surrounding region. In addition to his ensemble work, he also appeared as a solo pianist at Cornelia Street Cafe for literary events and poetry readings. Beyond the concert stage, he became deeply involved in New York's late-night jam-session culture through informal house sessions and underground musical gatherings throughout Manhattan, Brooklyn, and Harlem.

Alongside his American projects, Bedikyan continued to perform extensively throughout Europe with the Burak Bedikyan European Quartet, which later evolved into Hybrid 4tet, appearing at venues and festivals such as Porgy & Bess and Jazzland (Vienna), Café Museum (Passau), Royal Garden Jazz Club (Graz), Die Kellerei (Reutte), Freiraum (Jenbach), Alter Schlachthof (Wels), and other venues across Europe. As both a leader and collaborator, he has performed internationally throughout the United States, Canada, Turkey, and Europe, including appearances in Germany, Austria, Switzerland, France, Italy, Lithuania, Malta, the Netherlands, and Kosovo.

Throughout his career, he has shared the stage or recording studio with numerous internationally recognized musicians, including Chris Potter, Benny Golson, Wynton Marsalis, Chris Cheek, Gabor Bolla, Bill Stewart, Billy Drummond, Vincent Herring, Mark Shim, Ari Ambrose, Brian Lynch, Sean Jones, Steve Wilson, Steve Cardenas, John Ellis, Rez Abbasi, Ricky Ford, Carlo Muscat, Kestutis Vaiginis, Kevin Mahogany, Stefano Di Battista, Dusko Goykovich, Adam Nussbaum, Jay Anderson, Harvie S, Tim Horner, Eric Revis, Ted Poor, Donald Edwards, Loren Stillman, Jim Rotondi, and Maffy Falay.

== Teaching ==
Alongside his performing career, Bedikyan has remained active in music education for more than two decades. He has taught piano, jazz improvisation, harmony, music theory, composition, ensemble performance in both Turkey and United States. His teaching philosophy emphasizes listening, musical expression, and creativity as the foundation upon which technical development is built. His work has included private instruction, institutional teaching, workshops, masterclasses, program direction, adjudication, and band directing. In recent years, his teaching has expanded beyond piano to include instruments such as trumpet, flute, drums and guitar, among others. He has also prepared students for auditions to specialized performing arts high schools and music colleges, as well as for ABRSM and NYSSMA examinations including classical and jazz piano competitions. He continues to serve as a jazz band director at independent schools in New Jersey. He also maintains an active private teaching studio in Hoboken, where he teaches students ranging from children and adult amateurs to university music majors and professional musicians.

== Critical reception ==
Beginning in the early 2020s, following his SteepleChase Records period, Bedikyan gradually shifted the primary focus of his artistic activity toward independent recording, composition, and music education. During this period, he released a series of independently produced solo piano albums, EPs, and digital singles centered on spontaneous composition and improvisation, including the albums Introspection, No Strings Attached, BE-ING, and Self-Exploration.

His recordings have been reviewed by publications including, DownBeat, The Guardian, Financial Times, Jazzwise, Jazz Journal, All About Jazz, Hot House Jazz Magazine, The New York City Jazz Record, Jazz in M.E.E., LA Jazz Scene, Turkish Jazz Magazine (Jazz Dergisi), among others. Several of his recordings have also appeared repeatedly in annual Best of selections published by jazz media in Turkey and internationally, including Cazkolik's annual selections from the 2010s and 2020s.

== Musical Style ==
Bedikyan's musical language is rooted in the American jazz tradition while drawing extensively from European classical music and 20th century concert music. His artistic voice evolved from mainstream jazz and bebop toward a contemporary harmonic and melodic language shaped by modern jazz, spontaneous composition, and collective improvisation.

Rather than identifying with a single stylistic school, his work moves fluidly between fully notated compositions and freely improvised performances. A defining characteristic of his music is the balance between structure and spontaneity, treating improvisation as a process of musical discovery rather than the spontaneous rearrangement of established vocabulary, while maintaining a strong sense of swing, rhythmic flow, and narrative development.

== Discography ==
Bedikyan has released the following albums. An asterisk (*) indicates that the year is that of release.

=== As leader/co-leader ===
Year recorded	Title	Label	Personnel/Notes
2013*	Circle of Life	SteepleChase	Quartet, with Chris Potter (sax), Peter Washington (bass), Bill Stewart (drums)
2015*	Leap of Faith	SteepleChase	Quartet, with Chris Cheek (tenor sax, soprano sax), Ron McClure (bass), Billy Drummond (drums)
2016*	Awakening	SteepleChase	Quartet, with Loren Stillman (alto sax), Ugonna Okegwo (bass), Donald Edwards (drums)
2017*	The Hybrid 4tet (Live at Amsec)	Alessa Records	Quartet, with Andy Middleton (sax), Johannes Strasser (bass), Joris Dudli (drums)
2018*	New Beginning	SteepleChase	Trio, with Jay Anderson (bass), Adam Nussbaum (drums)
2019*	Istanbul Junction	SteepleChase	Trio + 1, with Matthew Hall (bass), Can Kozlu (drums), and Gabor Bolla (sax).
2021*	Introspection	SteepleChase	Solo Piano
2023*	Solo Standards, Vol 1	Arya Records	Solo Piano
2023*	No Strings Attached	Arya Records	Solo Piano
2023*	Be-Ing	Arya Records	Solo Piano
2024*	Self-Exploration	Arya Records	Solo Piano

=== Singles & EPs (Solo Piano Works) ===
- Hope Is a Lonesome Flower (2022)
- Peace (2022)
- Treaty (2022)
- Unfulfilled Dreams (2022)
- Euphoria (2022)
- Gece (2022)
- Conflict No. 1 (2022)
- Conflict No. 2 (2022)
- Search No More (2022)
- İnsaf (2022)
- Static (2022)
- Thinking of Bill (2022)
- For Chick (Joy of Living) (2022)
- Beş Vakte Kadar (2022)
- Reflections on Grindelton Street (2022)
- Lost in a Dream – Part I & Part II (2022)
- La Fille aux Cheveux d'Or (2022)
- Along Came Benny (2022)
- Walk with Me (2022)
- Disorder (2022)
- Promenade in A Minor (2022)
- Sorrow (Keder) (EP) (2022)
- Octaves (2022)
- Bells (2022)
- Shortcomings (2022)
- Toccata Solemnis (2022)
- Farewell (2022)
- The Night Has Come (2022)

Bandcamp-exclusive releases: Green in Blue and Reflections on Lazy Bird (Take 2).

=== As sideman ===
Year recorded	Leader	Title	Label
2010*	Ferit Odman	Nommo	Equinox
2011*	Bilal Karaman	Bahane	BBS Music
2012*	Bora Celiker	Borabook	Equinox
2018*	Bora Celiker	Ters Yuz	Pb Muzik
2020*	30th Akbank Jazz Festival (Compilation)	Dun,Bugun,Yarin	Gloss Musik GmbH
2022*	Ferhat Ferat	Maharet	DMC
