= Sea Changes =

1996 studio album by Tommy Flanagan

Studio album by Tommy Flanagan
- Released: 1996
- Recorded: March 11–12, 1996
- Studio: Clinton Recording Studios, NYC
- Genre: Jazz
- Length: 62:46
- Label: Alfa Jazz; ALCB-3907
- Producer: Diana Flanagan and Todd Barkan

Tommy Flanagan chronology
Lady Be Good ... For Ella (1993)	Sea Changes (1996)	Sunset and the Mockingbird (1997)

Sea Changes is a studio album by pianist Tommy Flanagan recorded in 1996 for the Japanese Alfa Jazz label. In the United States, the album was released in 1997 by Evidence Music.

Five of the album's eleven compositions were recorded by Flanagan in 1957 for his debut album, Overseas, including "Relaxin' at Camarillo" and four Flanagan compositions ("Beat's Up", "Eclypso", "Verdandi" and "Dalarna"). The other titles are thematically related to the earlier album, which was recorded in Stockholm, either by their connection to the idea of the sea ("How Deep Is the Ocean", "Between the Devil and the Deep Blue Sea", "I Cover the Waterfront", "Sea Changes"), referencing Stockholm ("Dear Old Stockholm"), or, in the case of Ma Rainy's "See See Rider", including a homophone of "sea" in the title.

== Reception ==
Professional ratings
Review scores
Source	Rating
AllMusic	4/5 stars

AllMusic gave the album 4 stars, with Ken Dryden's review stating: "It's easy to understand why Tommy Flanagan has been one of the most praised pianists over the '80s and '90s while listening to an excellent trio date such as this CD". On All About Jazz, Chris M. Slawecki wrote: "in its own dignified, almost quiet, way, Sea Changes demonstrates that Tommy Flanagan remains a musician's musician in every sense of the word – as an improviser and soloist, as a composer and arranger, as a melodic interpreter and as an accompanist for ample, robust solos by his musical partners".

== Track listing ==
All compositions by Tommy Flanagan, except where indicated.

1. "Sea Changes" - 6:30
2. "Verdandi" - 4:23
3. "Dalarna" - 4:58 spelled "Delarna" on the U.S. release
4. "Eclypso" - 7:05
5. "How Deep Is the Ocean?" (Irving Berlin) - 6:38
6. "See See Rider" (Ma Rainey) - 4:42 spelled "C.C. Rider" on the U.S. release
7. "Between the Devil and the Deep Blue Sea" (Harold Arlen, Ted Koehler) - 6:45
8. "Beat's Up" - 5:30
9. "I Cover the Waterfront" (Johnny Green, Edward Heyman) - 6:09
10. "Relaxin' at Camarillo" (Charlie Parker) - 5:14
11. "Dear Old Stockholm" (Traditional) - 4:52

== Personnel ==
- Tommy Flanagan - piano
- Peter Washington - bass (tracks 1–10)
- Lewis Nash - drums (tracks 1–10)
