= Eli Wolf =

American football player (born 1997)

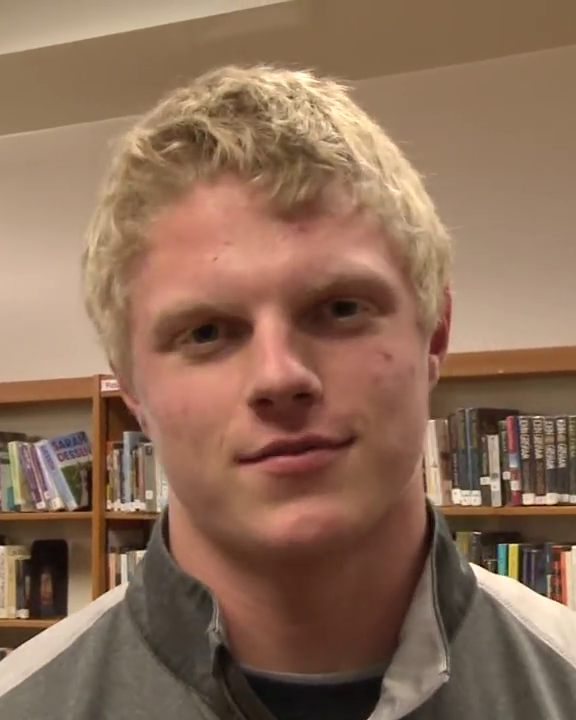
- Wolf in 2015

No. 85, 46
- Position: Tight end

Personal information
- Born: March 11, 1997 (age 29); Minster, Ohio, U.S.
- Listed height: 6 ft 4 in (1.93 m)
- Listed weight: 238 lb (108 kg)

Career information
- High school: Minster (Minster, Ohio)
- College: Tennessee (2015–2018); Georgia (2019)
- NFL draft: 2020: undrafted

Career history
- Baltimore Ravens (2020–2021); Indianapolis Colts (2021)*; Green Bay Packers (2022)*; Washington Commanders (2022)*
- * Offseason or practice squad member only
- Stats at Pro Football Reference

Elijah Jackson Wolf (born March 11, 1997) is an American former football tight end who played in the National Football League. Wolf played college football at Georgia and Tennessee. Wolf played for the Baltimore Ravens, Indianapolis Colts, Green Bay Packers, and Washington Commanders.

== High school ==
Wolf attended Minster High School in Minster, Ohio. While at Minster High school, Wolf originally was a wide receiver, but later made the change to his current tight end position.

Wolf caught the winning touchdown of the state championship game in his senior year of high school.

== College career ==
After finishing his high school career, Wolf first committed to Eastern Michigan University. However, after a friend was killed, Wolf later decommitted from Eastern Michigan and decided to join his brother Ethan Wolf at Tennessee, where Eli was a walk-on. While at Tennessee, Wolf only had 8 receptions for 86 yards and 1 touchdown in 3 years. This was due in part to the fact that Tennessee had a different offensive coordinator in each of his three years there. After his Junior year, Wolf decided to enter the transfer portal and transferred to the Georgia Bulldogs. At Georgia, Wolf had 13 receptions for 194 yards, which in one year was more than he amassed at Tennessee in 3 years, and 1 touchdown. After the 2019 college football season, Wolf declared for the NFL draft.

== Professional career ==
Pre-draft measurables
Height	Weight	Arm length	Hand span
6 ft 4 1/4 in (1.94 m)	238 lb (108 kg)	31 5/8 in (0.80 m)	9 1/4 in (0.23 m)
All values from Pro Day

=== Baltimore Ravens ===
Wolf signed with the Baltimore Ravens as an undrafted free agent following the 2020 NFL draft on May 5, 2020. He was waived during final roster cuts on September 5, 2020, and signed to the team's practice squad the next day. He was placed on the practice squad/injured list on November 3, 2020, and restored to the practice squad on December 10. On January 18, 2021, Wolf signed a reserve/futures contract with the Ravens. He was waived on August 16, 2021.

=== Indianapolis Colts ===
On October 26, 2021, Wolf was signed to the Indianapolis Colts practice squad. He signed a reserve/future contract on January 10, 2022. He was waived on May 10, 2022.

=== Green Bay Packers ===
On May 12, 2022, Wolf was claimed off waivers by the Green Bay Packers. He was released on July 22, 2022.

=== Washington Commanders ===
On August 7, 2022, Wolf signed with the Washington Commanders. He was placed on injured reserve on August 22, 2022.

Wolf announced his retirement on March 19, 2023.
