= Peter Washington =

American jazz double bassist

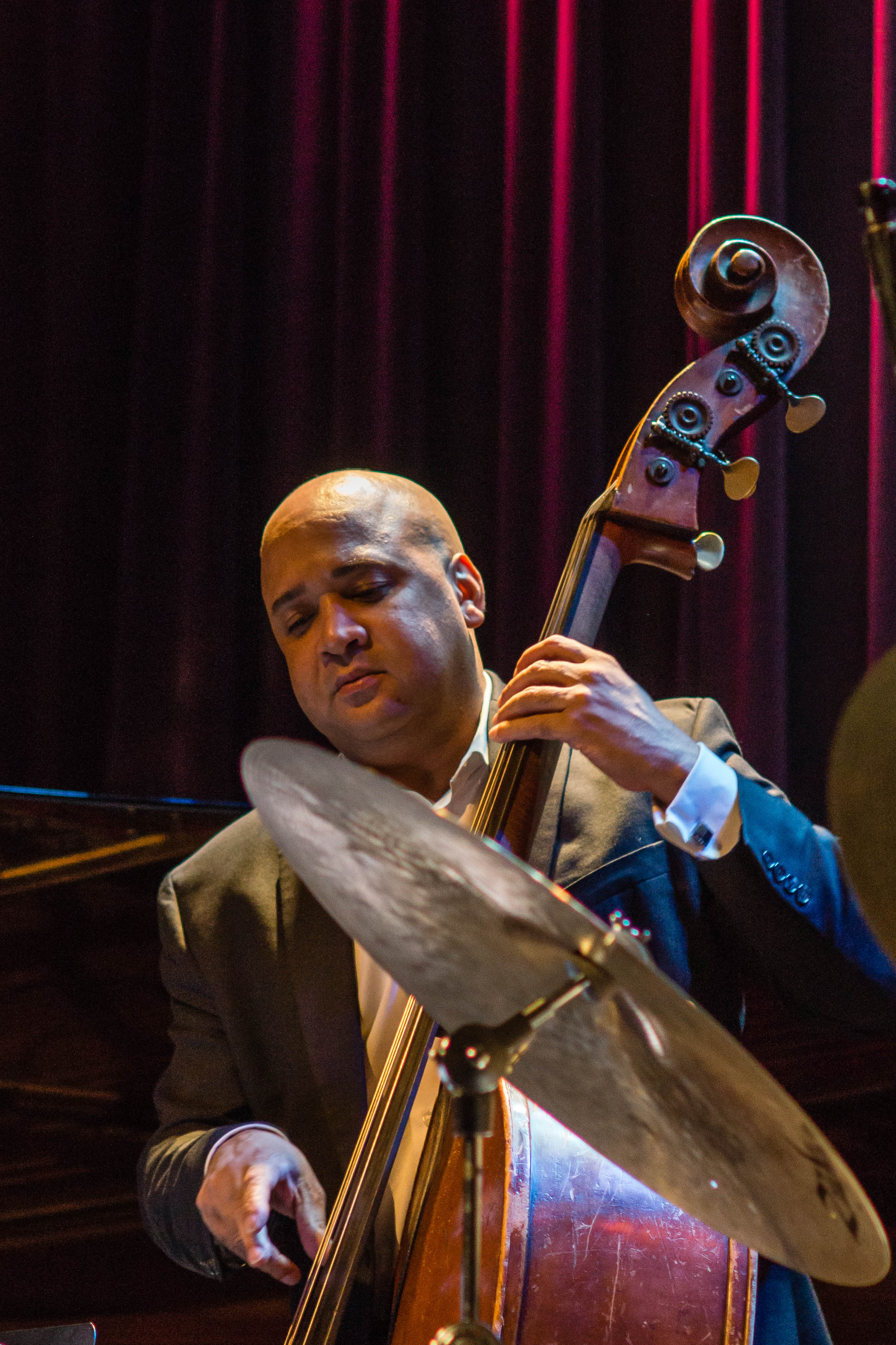
- Washington at Dimitriou's in 2012

Background information
- Born: August 28, 1964 (age 62); Los Angeles, California, U.S.
- Genre: Jazz
- Occupation: Musician
- Instrument: Bass
- Years active: 1978–present
- Formerly of: The Jazz Messengers; One for All; The Blue Note 7

Peter Washington (born August 28, 1964) is a jazz double bassist. He played with the Westchester Community Symphony at the age of 14. Later he played electric bass in rock bands. He attended the University of California, Berkeley, where he majored in English Literature, and performed with the San Francisco Youth Symphony and the UC Symphony Orchestra. His growing interest in jazz led him to play with John Handy, Bobby Hutcherson, Harold Land, Frank Morgan, Ernestine Anderson, Chris Connor and other Bay Area luminaries. In 1986 he joined Art Blakey and The Jazz Messengers and moved to New York City. Beginning in the 1990s, he toured with the Tommy Flanagan trio until Flanagan's death in 2001, and has played with the Bill Charlap trio since 1997. He was a founding member of the collective hard bop sextet One for All and is a visiting artist with the Chicago Symphony Orchestra.

In 2008, Washington played with The Blue Note 7, an all-star septet formed in honor of the 70th anniversary of Blue Note Records.

== Discography ==
With Toshiko Akiyoshi

- Carnegie Hall Concert (Columbia, 1992)
- Night and Dream (Nippon Crown, 1993)
- Dig (Nippon Crown, 1999)

With Eric Alexander

- New York Calling (Criss Cross, 1992)
- Full Range (Criss Cross, 1994)
- Heavy Hitters (Alfa Jazz, 1998)
- Extra Innings (Alfa Jazz, 1998)
- The First Milestone (Milestone, 1999)
- The Second Milestone (Milestone, 2000)

With Harry Allen

- Day Dream (BMG, 1998)
- Harry Allen Plays Ellington Songs with the Bill Charlap Trio (RCA Victor, 2000)
- Blues For Pres And Teddy (Swing Bros, 2011)

With Karrin Allyson

- In Blue (Concord, 2002)
- Footprints (Concord, 2006)

With Ernie Andrews

- No Regrets (Muse, 1993)
- The Great City (Muse, 1995)

With Ray Appleton

- Killer Ray Rides Again (Sharp Nine, 1996)

With François Aubin

- Jazz Project 2 (CD Baby, 2011)

With Rob Bargad

- Better Times (Criss Cross, 1993)

With Kenny Barron

- Flight Path (Candid, 2015)

With Burak Bedikyan

- Circle of Life (SteepleChase, 2013)

With Bob Belden

- Shades of Blue (Blue Note, 1996)

With Marcus Belgrave

- Live at Kerrytown Concert House (Detroit Jazz, 1995)

With Tony Bennett and Diana Krall

- Love Is Here to Stay (Verve, 2018)

With Andy Bey

- Shades of Bey (Evidence, 1998)
- Tuesdays in Chinatown (Warlock, 2001)
- Ain't Necessarily So (12th Street, 2007)

With Walter Bishop, Jr.

- What's New (DIW, 1991)

With Art Blakey and The Jazz Messengers

- Art Blakey And Jazz Messengers (Arco, 1986)
- Feeling Good (Delos, 1986)
- Hard Champion (Paddle Wheel, 1987)
- Blue Moon (Zounds, 1987)
- Not Yet (Soul Note, 1988)

With The Blue Note 7

- Mosaic: A Celebration of Blue Note Records (Blue Note, 2009)

With Sacha Boutros

- New York After Dark (Diva Latina Productions: Sacha Boutros, 2013)
- New York Apres Minuit (Diva Latina Productions: Sacha Boutros, 2018)

With The Boys Choir of Harlem

- Christmas Carols & Sacred Songs (Blue Note, 1996)

With Bobby Broom

- No Hype Blues (Criss Cross, 1995)

With Cecil Brooks III

- Hangin' with Smooth (Muse, 1990)
- Our Mister Brooks (32 Jazz, 2000)

With Bubba Brooks

- Smooth Sailing (TCB, 1995)

With Ray Bryant

- No Problem (EmArcy, 1994)

With Kenny Burrell

- Then Along Came Kenny (Evidence, 1993 [1996])
- Midnight at the Village Vanguard (Evidence, 1993 [1997])
- Be Yourself: Live at Dizzy's Club Coca-Cola (HighPoint, 2008)

With Donald Byrd

- Getting Down to Business (Landmark, 1989)
- Landmarks (32 Jazz, 1998)

With George Cables

- Cables Fables (SteepleChase, 1991)
- Looking for the Light (MuseFX, 2003)

With Ann Hampton Callaway

- Easy Living (Sin-Drome, 1999)

With The Carnegie Hall Jazz Band

- The Carnegie Hall Jazz Band (Blue Note, 1996)

With Regina Carter

- Rhythms of the Heart (Verve, 1999)

With James Carter

- Gardenias for Lady Day (Columbia, 2003)

With Celtic Jazz Collective

- Aislinn (A Vision) (Mapleshade, 2001)

With Bill Charlap

- All Through the Night (Criss Cross, 1998)
- S'Wonderful (Venus, 1998)
- Written in the Stars (Blue Note, 2000)
- Stardust (Blue Note, 2002)
- Somewhere: The Songs of Leonard Bernstein (Blue Note, 2004)
- Plays George Gershwin: The American Soul (Blue Note, 2005)
- Live at The Village Vanguard (Blue Note, 2007)
- I'm Old Fashioned (Venus, 2010)
- Notes From New York (Impulse!, 2015)
- The Silver Lining: The Songs Of Jerome Kern (RPM, 2015)
- Uptown, Downtown (Impulse!, 2017)
- Street of Dreams (Blue Note, 2021)

With Ed Cherry

- First Take (Groovin' High, 1993)

With David Chesky

- Jazz In the New Harmonic (Chesky, 2012)
- Primal Scream (Chesky, 2014)

With Jimmy Cobb

- Cobb's Corner (Chesky, 2007)

With Anat Cohen

- Clarinetwork: Live at the Village Vanguard (Anzic, 2010)

With Joe Cohn

- Shared Contemplations (Criss Cross, 2009)

With Freddy Cole

- Because Of You (HighNote, 2006)
- Music Maestro Please (HighNote, 2007)

With Eric Comstock

- No One Knows (Harbinger, 2005)

With Bill Cosby

- My Appreciation (Polygram, 1991)
- Hello, Friend: To Ennis With Love (Verve, 1997)

With Stanley Cowell

- Setup (SteepleChase, 1994)

With Jeremy Davenport

- Maybe in a Dream (Telarc, 1997)

With Charles Davis

- Reflections (Red, 1990)
- Blue Gardenia (Reade Street, 2003)

With Jesse Davis

- High Standards (Concord. 1994)
- Live at Small's (Smallslive, 2012)

With Steve Davis

- Vibe Up! (Criss Cross, 1998)
- Systems Blue (Criss Cross, 2001)
- Think Ahead (Smoke Sessions, 2017)

With Peter Delano

- Bite of the Apple (Verve, 1994)

With Dena DeRose

- Love's Holiday (Sharp Nine, 2002)

With Mike DiRubbo

- Human Spirit (Criss Cross, 2002)

With Kenny Drew, Jr.

- Passionata (Meldac Jazz, 1995)

With Billy Drummond

- The Gift (Criss Cross, 1993)
- Dubai (Criss Cross, 1995)

With Teddy Edwards

- Horn to Horn (Muse, 1994)

With Mark Elf

- A Minor Scramble (Jen Bay, 1997)
- Glad To Be Back (Jen Bay, 2004)
- Liftoff (Jen Bay, 2006)
- Mark Elf Returns 2014 (Jen Bay, 2014)

With Mercer Ellington

- Only God Can Make a Tree (MusicMasters, 1996)

With Dave Ellis

- State of Mind (Milestone, 2003)

With Robin Eubanks

- Different Perspectives (JMT, 1988)

With Georgie Fame

- Poet in New York (Go Jazz, 2000)

With Joe Farnsworth

- Time to Swing (Smoke Sessions, 2020)

With Tommy Flanagan

- Lady Be Good ... For Ella (Groovin' High, 1993)
- Sea Changes (Alfa Jazz, 1996)
- Sunset and the Mockingbird (Blue Note, 1997)

With Flutology

- First Date (Capri, 2003)

With Ricky Ford

- Tenor Madness Too! (Muse, 1992)

With Sullivan Fortner

- Southern Nights (Artwork, 2023)

With Tomas Franck

- Tomas Franck in New York (Criss Cross, 1990)

With Nnenna Freelon

- Maiden Voyage (Concord, 1998)

With Joe Friedman

- Cup O' Joe (NASMusic 3, 2006)

With Andy Fusco

- Out of the Dark (Criss Cross, 1998)

With Giacomo Gates

- Fly Rite (Sharp Nine, 1998)

With Chantale Gagné

- The Left Side of the Moon (2014)

With Dizzy Gillespie

- To Diz with Love (Telarc, 1996)

With Greg Gisbert

- On Second Thought (Criss Cross, 1994)

With Dave Glasser

- Uh! Oh! (Nagel Hayer, 2000)
- Dreams Askew, Dreams Anew (Artemis, 2001)

With Benny Golson

- Benny Golson Quartet Live (Dreyfus, 1989 [1991])
- Remembering Clifford (Milestone, 1998)
- Brown Immortal (Keystone, 2005)

With Jon Gordon

- Possibilities (Double-Time, 2000)

With Benny Green

- Prelude (Criss Cross, 1988)
- Source (Jazz Legacy, 2011)
- Magic Beans (Sunnyside, 2013)

With Johnny Griffin

- Dance of Passion (Antilles, 1993)

With Don Grolnick

- London Concert (Fuzzy Music, 2000)

With Russell Gunn

- Young Gunn (Muse, 1994)
- Young Gunn Plus (32 Jazz, 1998)

With Jeff Hackworth

- How Little We Know (Big Bridge, 2007)

With Tim Hagans & Marcus Printup

- Hub Songs: The Music of Freddie Hubbard (Blue Note, 1998)

With Waturo Hamasaki

- Holiday (Concept, 2015)
- Prisoner Of Love (Concept, 2017)

With Scott Hamilton

- Back in New York (Concord, 2005)

With Lionel Hampton

- Mostly Ballads (MusicMasters, 1990)

With Tom Harrell

- Passages (Chesky, 1991)
- Upswing (Chesky, 1994)
- Trumpet Legacy (Milestone, 1998)

With Barry Harris

- Eastwood After Hours: Live at Carnegie Hall (Malpaso, 1997)

With Michael Hashim

- Guys and Dolls (Stash, 1992)
- Multicolored Blue (Hep, 1999)

With Hiroshi Hata

- Introducing Hiroshi Hata (Kaneha, 1998)
- Door To Door (Kaneha, 2001)

With David Hazeltine

- The Classic Trio (Sharp Nine, 1996)
- Four Flights Up (Sharp Nine, 1996)
- How It Is (Criss Cross, 1997)
- A World For Her (Criss Cross, 1998)
- The Classic Trio, Volume 2 (Sharp Nine, 2001)
- Pearls (Tokuma, 2001)
- Señor Blues (Venus, 2001)
- Close To You (Criss Cross, 2003)
- Manhattan Autumn (Sharp Nine, 2003)
- Perambulation (Criss Cross, 2005)
- Blues Quarters Vol. 2 (Criss Cross, 2006)

With Jimmy Heath Big Band

- Turn Up the Heat (Planet Arts, 2007)
- Togetherness: Live at The Blue Note (Jazz Legacy, 2013)

With Percy Heath

- A Love Song (Daddy Jazz, 2002)

With Eddie Henderson

- Tribute to Lee Morgan (NYC, 1995)

With Ian Hendrickson-Smith

- Still Smokin' (Sharp Nine, 2004)

With Conrad Herwig

- Heart of Darkness (Criss Cross, 1997)

With Steve Hobbs

- On the Lower East Side (Candid, 1993)
- Second Encounter (Candid, 2003)
- Spring Cycle (Random Chance, 2005)
- Vibes, Straight Up (Challenge, 2009)
- Tribute to Bobby (Challenge, 2018)

With Holly Hofmann

- Minor Miracle (Capri, 2004)

With Freddie Hubbard

- MMTC: Monk, Miles, Trane & Cannon (MusicMasters, 1995)
- God Bless the Child (MusicMasters, 1998)

With Bobby Hutcherson

- Mirage (Landmark, 1991)

With Javon Jackson

- When the Time Is Right (Blue Note, 1994)
- For One Who Knows (Blue Note, 1995)
- A Look Within (Blue Note, 1996)
- Good People (Blue Note, 1997)

With The Jazz Messengers

- The Legacy of Art Blakey (Telarc, 1998)

With Steve Kaldestad

- New York Afternoon (Cellar Live, 2015)

With Geoff Keezer

- Here and Now (Blue Note, 1991)

With Jonny King

- Notes from the Underground (Enja, 1996)

With Anna Kolchina

- Wild Is the Wind (Venus, 2017)

With Lee Konitz

- Frescalalto (Decca, 2017)

With David Lahm

- Jazz Takes On Joni Mitchell (Arkadia, 1999)

With The Lalama Brothers

- Erie Avenue' (Lalama, 2011)

With Ralph Lalama

- Feelin' and Dealin' (Criss Cross, 1990)
- Circle Line (Criss Cross, 1996)
- Music For Grown-Ups (Criss Cross, 1998)

With Andy LaVerne

- Bud's Beautiful (SteepleChase, 1996)

With Mike LeDonne

- Soulmates (Criss Cross, 1993)
- Waltz For An Urbanite (Criss Cross, 1995)
- To Each His Own (Double-Time, 1998)
- Then and Now (Double-Time, 1999)

With David Leonhardt

- Reflections (Big Bang, 1994)

With Deborah Lippman

- Nightingale (NJ, 2005)

With Jan Lundgren

- New York Calling (Alfa Jazz, 1995)

With Brian Lynch

- Back Room Blues (Criss Cross, 1990)
- Keep Your Circle Small (Sharp Nine, 1995)

With Teo Macero

- Impressions of Miles Davis (Orchard, 2001)

With Joe Magnarelli

- Why Not (Criss Cross, 1994)
- Philly-New York Junction (Criss Cross, 1998)
- New York-Philly Junction (Criss Cross, 2003)
- Persistence (Reservoir, 2008)

With Malta

- Manhattan in Blue (JVC Victor, 2004)

With Junior Mance

- Music of Thelonious Monk (Chiaroscuro, 2003)

With Claire Martin

- Make This City Ours (Linn, 1997)

With Akane Matsumoto

- Memories Of You (Concept, 2015)

With Bill Mays

- At the Movies (SteepleChase, 2009)

With Marian McPartland

- An NPR Jazz Christmas with Marian McPartland and Friends (NPR, 1997)

With Charles McPherson

- First Flight Out (Arabesque, 1994)

With Message

- The Art of Blakey (King, 1993)

With Mulgrew Miller

- Time and Again (Landmark, 1992)

With Antoinette Montague

- Pretty Blues (Consolidated Artists, 2006)

With Ralph Moore

- Rejuvenate! (Criss Cross, 1988)
- Images (Landmark, 1989)
- Furthermore (Landmark, 1990)
- Who It Is You Are (Savoy, 1994)

With Fabio Morgera

- The Pursuit (Ken, 1991)

With Dado Moroni

- Insights (Jazz Focus, 1996)
- Shapes (TCB, 2010)

With Ronald Muldrow

- Diaspora (Enja, 1995)
- Facing Wes (Kokopelli, 1996)
- Freedom's Serenade (Double-Time, 1999)
- Mapenzi (Joh-Bev, 2003)

With Lewis Nash

- Rhythm Is My Business (Evidence, 1993)
- The Highest Mountain (Cellar Live, 2011)

With Steve Nelson

- New Beginnings (TCB, 1999)
- Sound-Effect (HighNote, 2007)
- Brothers Under the Sun (HighNote, 2017)

With New Stories

- Hope Is In the Air: The Music of Elmo Hope (Origin, 2004)

With David "Fathead" Newman

- Mr. Gentle Mr. Cool (Kokopelli, 1994)
- Diamondhead (HighNote, 2008)

With Dan Nimmer

- Yours Is My Heart Alone (Venus, 2008)

With Trisha O'Brien

- Out of a Dream (Azica, 2010)

With Ferit Odman

- Nommo (Equinox, 2010)
- Autumn in New York (Equinox, 2011)
- Dameronia With Strings (Equinox, 2015)

With One For All

- Too Soon To Tell (Sharp Nine, 1997)
- Optimism (Sharp Nine, 1998)
- Upward and Onward (Criss Cross, 1999)
- Live at Smoke: Volume 1 (Criss Cross, 2001)
- The End of a Love Affair (Venus, 2001)
- Wide Horizons (Criss Cross, 2002)
- Blueslike (Criss Cross, 2003)

With Jeremy Pelt

- Close To My Heart (MAXJAZZ, 2003)
- The Art of Intimacy, Vol. 1 (HighNote, 2020)

With Rich Perry

- So In Love (SteepleCahse, 1997)

With Houston Person

- A Little Houston on the side (32 Jazz, 1999)
- Sentimental Journey (HighNote, 2002)
- The Art and Soul of Houston Person (HighNote, 2008)

With Jimmy Ponder

- Soul Eyes (Muse, 1991)
- Something to Ponder (Muse, 1994 [1996])

With Valery Ponomarev

- Live at Sweet Basil (Reservoir, 1993)

With The Power Quintet

- High Art (HighNote, 2016)

With Simon Rattle

- Classic Ellington (EMI Classics, 2000)
- Americana (EMI Classics, 2004)
- American Music (EMI Classics, 2008)
- Duke Ellington: Mainly Black (EMI Classics, 2010)

With Reeds and Deeds

- Wailin' (Criss Cross, 2005)

With Ben Riley's Monk Legacy Septet

- Memories of T (Concord, 2006)

With Wallace Roney

- Seth Air (Muse, 1991)
- According to Mr. Roney (32 Jazz, 1997)
- No Job Too Big or Small (Muse, 1999)

With Renee Rosnes

- Ancestors (Blue Note, 1996)
- With a Little Help from My Friends (Blue Note, 2001)
- A Time For Love (VideoArts, 2005)
- Written in the Rocks (Smoke Sessions, 2016)
- Beloved of the Sky (Smoke Sessions, 2018)

With Annie Ross

- Music Is Forever (DRG, 1996)

With Jim Rotondi

- Excursions (Criss Cross, 1998)
- Destination Up (Sharp Nine, 2001)

With David Sanchez

- The Departure (Columbia, 1994)

With Randy Sandke

- Cliffhanger (Nagel Heyer, 1999)
- Rediscovered Louis and Bix (Nagel Heyer, 2000)

With Rob Schneiderman

- Dark Blue (Reservoir, 1994)

With Stephen Scott

- Something to Consider (Verve, 1991)

With Charlie Sepulveda

- The New Arrival (Antilles, 1991)

With Vladimir Shafranov

- Live at Groovy (Kompass, 1992)
- Whisper Not (Venus, 2012)

With Ian Shaw

- A World Still Turning (441, 2003)

With Marlena Shaw

- Dangerous (Concord, 1996)

With Don Sickler

- Night Watch (Uptown, 1990)
- Reflections (HighNote, 2002)

With Derek Smith

- Beautiful Love (Venus, 2009)

With Neal Smith

- Some of My Favorite Songs Are... (NAS, 2005)

With Tommy Smith

- The Sound of Love (Linn, 1999)

With The Smithsonian Jazz Masterworks Orchestra

- Tribute to a Generation: A Salute to the Big Bands (Smithsonian Folkways, 2004)

With Jim Snidero

- Mixed Bag (Criss Cross, 1987)
- Blue Afternoon (Criss Cross, 1989)
- Storm Rising (Ken, 1990)
- Urban Tales (Square Discs, 1991)
- While You Are Here (Red, 1992)
- Vertigo (Criss Cross, 1994)

With Terell Stafford

- This Side of Strayhorn (MAXJAZZ, 2011)
- Brotherlee Love: Celebrating Lee Morgan (Capri, 2015)

With Mary Stallings

- Feelin' Good (HighNote, 2015)

With Grant Stewart

- Downtown Sounds (Criss Cross, 1992)
- More Urban Tones (Criss Cross, 1995)
- Wailin' (Criss Cross, 2004)
- In the Still of the Night (Sharp Nine, 2007)
- The Shadow of Your Smile (Sharp Nine, 2007)
- Young at Heart (Sharp Nine, 2007)
- Around the Corner (Sharp Nine, 2010)

With Joan Stiles

- Hurly-Burly (Oo-Bla-Dee, 2005)

With Byron Stripling

- Stripling Now! (Nagel Heyer, 1999)
- Byron, Get One Free (Nagel Heyer, 2001)

With Sub Dub

- Original Masters: 1993-1995 (The Agriculture, 2001)

With Helen Sung

- (re)Conception (SteepleChase, 2011)

With John Swana

- Introducing John Swana (Criss Cross, 1990)
- In the Moment (Criss Cross, 1995)
- Bright Moments (Criss Cross, 2007)

With Lew Tabackin

- I'll Be Seeing You (Concord, 1992)
- What a Little Moonlight Can Do (Concord, 1994)
- Tenority (Concord, 1996)

With Nino Tempo

- Tenor Saxophone (Atlantic, 1990)

With Steve Turre

- Viewpoint (Stash, 1987)
- In the Spur of the Moment (Telarc, 2000)
- TNT (Trombone-N-Tenor) (Telarc, 2001)
- One4J: Paying Homage to J.J. Johnson (Telarc, 2003)
- Keep Searchin' (HighNote, 2006)
- Rainbow People (HighNote, 2008)
- The Bones of Art (HighNote, 2013)

With Michal Urbaniak

- Songbird (SteepleChase, 1990)
- Some Other Blues (SteepleChase, 1994)

With Bennie Wallace

- Someone to Watch over Me (Enja, 1998)
- In Berlin (Tokuma, 2002)
- Moodsville (Groove Note, 2002)

With Cedar Walton

- Seasoned Wood (HighNote, 2008)

With Jon Weber

- Simple Complex (2nd Century Jazz, 2004)

With Cory Weeds-Bill Coon Quartet

- With Benefits (Cellar Live, 2013)

With Walt Weiskopf

- Simplicity (Criss Cross, 1992)
- Song For My Mother (Criss Cross, 1995)

With Jerry Weldon

- Head to Head (Criss Cross, 1999)

With Paula West

- Come What May (Hi Horse, 2001)

With Chip White

- More Dedications (Dark Colors, 2009)

With Wesla Whitfield

- September Songs: The Music of Wilder, Weill and Warren (HighNote, 2003)

With James Williams

- Jazz Dialogues, Vol. 2: Focus (FINAS, 2002)
- Jazz Dialogues, Vol. 3: Out of Nowhere (FINAS, 2003)

With Tom Williams

- Introducing Tom Williams (Criss Cross, 1991)
- Straight Street (Criss Cross, 1993)

With Gerald Wilson

- In My Time (Mack Avenue, 2005)
- Monterey Moods (Mack Avenue, 2007)
- Detroit (Mack Avenue, 2009)
- Legacy (Mack Avenue, 2011)

With Mike Wofford

- Live at Athenaeum Jazz (Capri, 2004)

With Phil Woods

- The Rev and I (Blue Note, 1998)
- Voyage (Chiaroscuro, 2001)

With Richard Wyands

- Reunited (Criss Cross, 1995)
- Get Out Of Town (SteepleChase, 1997)
- Lady of Lavender Mist (Venus, 1998)
- Half and Half (Criss Cross, 1999)
- The Gigi Gryce Project (Jazz Legacy, 1999)

With Miki Yamaoka

- I Remember Clifford (Denon, 1996)

With Aki Yashiro

- Yume no Yoru - Live In New York (Universal, 2013)

With Peter Zak

- Down East (SteepleChase, 2010)
- Nordic Noon (SteepleChase, 2011)
- The Eternal Triangle (SteepleChase, 2012)
- The Disciple (SteepleChase, 2013)
