= Tommy Flanagan (musician) =

American jazz pianist (1930–2001)

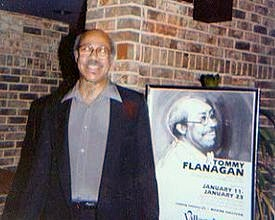
- Flanagan at the Village Jazz Lounge in Walt Disney World, 1978

Background information
- Born: Thomas Lee Flanagan; March 16, 1930; Detroit, Michigan, U.S.
- Died: November 16, 2001 (aged 71) New York City, New York, U.S.
- Genres: Bebop, hard bop, mainstream jazz
- Occupations: Musician, composer
- Instrument: Piano
- Years active: 1940s–2001

Thomas Lee Flanagan (March 16, 1930 – November 16, 2001) was an American jazz pianist and composer. He grew up in Detroit, initially influenced by such pianists as Art Tatum, Teddy Wilson, and Nat King Cole, and then by bebop musicians. Within months of moving to New York in 1956, he had recorded with Miles Davis and on Sonny Rollins' album Saxophone Colossus. Recordings under various leaders, including Giant Steps of John Coltrane, continued well into 1962, when he became the full-time accompanist to Ella Fitzgerald. He worked with Fitzgerald for three years until 1965, and then in 1968 returned to be her pianist and musical director, this time for a decade.

After leaving Fitzgerald in 1978, Flanagan attracted praise for the elegance of his playing, which was principally in trio settings when under his own leadership. In his 45-year recording career, he recorded more than three dozen albums under his own name and more than 200 as a sideman. By the time of his death, he was one of the most widely admired jazz pianists and had influenced both his contemporaries and later generations of players.

== Early life ==
Flanagan was born in Conant Gardens, Detroit, Michigan, on March 16, 1930. He was the youngest of six children – five boys and a girl. His parents were both originally from Georgia. His father, Johnson Sr., was a postman, and his mother, Ida Mae, worked in the garment industry.

At the age of six, Flanagan's parents gave him a clarinet for Christmas. He learned to read music from playing the clarinet, but within a few years he preferred the piano. The family had a piano in the house, and Flanagan received lessons from one of his brothers, Johnson, and Gladys Wade Dillard, who also taught Kirk Lightsey and Barry Harris. Flanagan graduated from Northern High School, which he attended with other future musicians, including saxophonist Sonny Red.

Flanagan's early influences included Art Tatum and Teddy Wilson, both of whom he heard on the radio and playing in the Detroit area, as well as Nat King Cole and local pianists Earl Van Riper and Willie Anderson. These, however, played in an earlier style, and the young Flanagan and his friends were more interested in the newer bebop, including that played by pianist Bud Powell, who had a strong effect on Flanagan's musical thinking and improvising.

== Later life and career ==
=== 1945–1955: Around Detroit ===
Flanagan's first concert was around 1945, with trombonist Frank Rosolino. Given Flanagan was only around 15 years old at the time, he could not stay in the bar area of the club between sets, so he went to another room and did some homework. As a teenager, he played in a band led by Lucky Thompson that also contained Pepper Adams and Kenny Burrell. Still in his teens, Flanagan also sat in on piano for some appearances by Charlie Parker in Detroit. During 1949, Flanagan had his first residence, at the Blue Bird Inn in Detroit. In 1950, he played with Rudy Rutherford, until the clarinetist returned to the Count Basie band. Flanagan then played jazz and rhythm and blues with saxophonist George Benson in Toledo, Ohio, before being drafted into the army in 1951.

After basic training in Fort Leonard Wood, Missouri, Flanagan auditioned as a pianist for an army show. He gained the role, which prevented him from being sent to the Korean War at that time; approximately a year later, however, he was sent to Kunsan, with the war ongoing. There, he worked as a motion-picture projectionist. After two years' service he was discharged and returned to Detroit, where he soon became pianist at the Blue Bird again. He again worked with Burrell, as well as Donald Byrd and Yusef Lateef, among others.

=== 1956–early 1978: After move to New York ===
Flanagan moved to New York in 1956. He was unsure of how long he would stay, having been persuaded to go by Burrell; the two men initially stayed with Burrell's aunt in Harlem. Flanagan soon found work in clubs and studios, including recording Detroit – New York Junction with Thad Jones in March. Later that month, he returned to recording, this time with Miles Davis and Sonny Rollins, for tracks released on Collectors' Items. Rollins was leader for another session three months later: Saxophone Colossus, which was labeled an "undisputed masterpiece" by The Penguin Guide to Jazz.

Flanagan also first accompanied Ella Fitzgerald in 1956, for around a month, including at the Newport Jazz Festival. Later that year, he joined trombonist J. J. Johnson, with whom he recorded several albums in 1957 and then toured Europe. While in Sweden, Flanagan, with bassist Wilbur Little and drummer Elvin Jones, recorded his first album as leader, Overseas. Late in 1957, he was part of Miles Davis' band for a short period, before returning to Johnson early the following year, for another stay of 10 months. A period leading his own trio in 1958 was followed by working with trombonist Tyree Glenn.

Throughout the late 1950s and early 1960s, Flanagan made frequent appearances in recording studios, for many leaders and record labels. In May 1959, he was part of a groundbreaking recording: John Coltrane's Giant Steps, described by The Penguin Guide to Jazz as the saxophonist's "first genuinely iconic record". The technical complexity of the music, particularly of the title track, meant that there were numerous false starts and rejected takes, and the initially released take of "Giant Steps" is a rare instance on record of Flanagan sounding uncertain. Another appearance on a landmark recording came in January of the following year: Flanagan was a member of the quartet that made The Incredible Jazz Guitar of Wes Montgomery; his playing complemented that of the guitarist, using controlled force on bebop numbers and delicacy on a ballad track.

Flanagan was with trumpeter Harry Edison in 1959–60, and tenor saxophonist Coleman Hawkins in 1961–62, including a UK tour. In this period, Flanagan recorded albums with several leaders from an earlier era, including Lionel Hampton, Jo Jones, and Pee Wee Russell, as well as one with Edison and around 10 with Hawkins. Flanagan then played with guitarist Jim Hall and bassist Percy Heath as a trio in New York.

In 1962, Flanagan was asked by jazz impresario Norman Granz to become Ella Fitzgerald's full-time accompanist. Flanagan was looking for steadier work than was available with Hawkins, so he accepted. He worked with Fitzgerald from 1962 to 1965. They toured internationally, including to Japan in 1964. He also played with other bands when not required by the vocalist; these included a brief reunion with Rollins in 1965. Later the same year, Flanagan left Fitzgerald and was part of Art Farmer's short-lived New York Jazz Sextet, which recorded Group Therapy. Flanagan then became accompanist to Tony Bennett for part of 1966, and lived on the West Coast.

Flanagan returned to working with Fitzgerald in 1968. In addition to being her pianist, mostly as part of a trio, he was her musical director. Her profile was high enough for the group to tour for 40–45 weeks a year, including at least one tour of Europe a year (29 cities on the continent in 1970, for example). During these concerts, Flanagan often played a set as part of his trio, without the singer. Beginning in 1974, he again began to perform and record as a leader: his 1975 trio release, The Tommy Flanagan Tokyo Recital, was his first as leader since 1960. Prior to these performances, he had felt that his technique was inadequate for a soloist, but he enjoyed the extra exposure of being a leader, so decided to continue. Flanagan ended his role with Fitzgerald in 1978, after he had a heart attack and had become tired of extensive touring. After the heart attack, he stopped smoking, reduced the amount that he drank, and exercised by walking more than he had previously.

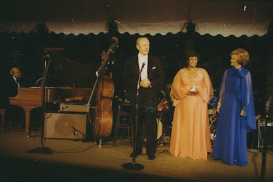
Flanagan (left) with Ella Fitzgerald and Gerald Ford

=== Late 1978–2001: After Ella Fitzgerald ===
Soon after leaving Fitzgerald, Flanagan played solo piano in New York. In 1979, he was a guest on the first series of Marian McPartland's Piano Jazz radio programs. He continued to work with other players, including as a trio with Tal Farlow and Red Mitchell in 1980. For much of the 1980s, he led a trio that featured bassist George Mraz and various drummers. By around 1990, Flanagan was concentrating on his own appearances and recordings rather than sideman activities. In the early 1990s, Mraz was replaced by Peter Washington, whose heavier bass lines added urgency to the trio's sound.

Flanagan's reputation gradually grew after he moved on from being primarily an accompanist: in a 1992 article, critic Leonard Feather suggested that "Flanagan is the pianist most likely to be named a personal idol by other jazz pianists, whether they be swing veterans or avant-gardists". This made him more in demand; the workload may have contributed to his collapse in 1991 and subsequent quadruple bypass heart surgery. He returned to playing within weeks, but also returned to hospital for treatment for an aneurysm. Flanagan was awarded the Danish Jazzpar Prize in 1993. Three years later, he was selected for a National Endowment for the Arts Jazz Masters Fellowship. In 1990, 1993, and 1997, Flanagan toured Japan, where he was very popular, with 100 Golden Fingers, a 10-pianist group.

Flanagan continued to be praised for the elegance of his playing – critic Ben Ratliff commented in 1998 that the trio with Washington and drummer Lewis Nash was, "in its controlled, elegant way, [...] one of the more extraordinarily coordinated piano trios in jazz's history". Despite the near-unanimous praise from critics and musicians for Flanagan's recordings and concert performances after he left Fitzgerald, he did not secure a recording contract with a major label for more than one album.

In late October 2001, Flanagan played in a John Coltrane tribute at the San Francisco Jazz Festival. The following month, he was admitted to Mount Sinai hospital in Manhattan; less than two weeks later, on November 16, he died there, from complications related to the aneurysm he had suffered a decade earlier.

== Personal life ==
Flanagan's mother died in 1959, and his father in 1977. Flanagan first married in 1960, to Ann. The couple had a son and two daughters, and divorced in the early 1970s; Ann was killed in a car accident in 1980. Flanagan married Diana, his second wife, in 1976. He was survived by Diana, the three children from his first marriage, and six grandchildren.

Flanagan was usually self-effacing, reserved, and amiable. His personality was summarized by his second wife: "His gentleness and quietness are deceptive. He is a strong man, and he has a lot of spirit and firmness."

== Playing style ==
Whitney Balliett stated that Flanagan was the most consistent of the pianists influenced by Wilson, Tatum and Cole, and invariably created something new in his playing: he "often states the melody with dissonant, levering chords played offbeat or staccato. Never decorative, they [...] reveal both a respect for the melody and an intense desire to alter it"; during his main improvising, he used "interval-filled descending figures [...] charging rhythmic phrases whose accented first notes make the succeeding notes snap, double-time phrases that race ahead to clear the way, and legato phrases that form sauntering rear guards." In a review of a 1989 concert, Feather commented that Flanagan used "subtle dynamic shadings", while "bursts of upsweeping chords sometimes lent an element of surprise, with a nimble left hand offering graceful filigree fills" and occasional musical quotes that added humor. Other techniques he employed were, in Stanley Crouch's description, "crooning effects achieved by manipulating the pedals, holding down keys long enough to sustain notes in decisively different ways, and working out inflections that evoke the voice – sighs, moans, swells, purrs". Critic John S. Wilson described Flanagan's solo piano style on ballads in 1978: "He drifts through ballads with a dreamy languorous flow, but it is not a soft or flabby style. There is, beneath the surface, a vitality that gives it a lean, swinging character".

Although he acknowledged the influence of other pianists, Flanagan stated that, "I like to play like a horn player, like I'm blowing into the piano. The sound of a piece – its over-all tonality – is what concerns me."

In concerts, Flanagan typically played a range of composers' works and, once he had become established as a small-group leader, he often played songs by Tadd Dameron, Duke Ellington, Benny Golson, Thad Jones, Tom McIntosh, and Thelonious Monk.

== Awards and legacy ==
During his career, Flanagan was nominated for five Grammy Awards. The first occasion was in 1983: The Magnificent Tommy Flanagan for Best Jazz Instrumental Performance, Soloist; and Giant Steps for Best Jazz Instrumental Performance, Group. Two years later, Thelonica was nominated for Best Jazz Instrumental Performance, Soloist. The next nomination was in 1998, for Best Jazz Instrumental Solo for his solo on "Dear Old Stockholm" from Sea Changes. The last, in 2003, was in the same category, for Flanagan's solo on "Sunset & the Mockingbird", from A Great Night in Harlem.

Flanagan's influence on pianists extended from his contemporaries to younger performers. Contemporaries included fellow Detroit players Barry Harris and Roland Hanna. Lightsey was influenced by Flanagan's musical creative thinking and pianistic fluidity. Alan Broadbent also acknowledged Flanagan as an influence, as did Helen Sung, who changed from being a classical music pianist to a jazz one after hearing the swing and logic of a Flanagan solo. Kenny Barron described Flanagan as his "hero" and stated that he admired the older man's touch and phrasing from when he first heard it at junior high school: "He became an influence and continued to be an influence till the day he died – and he still is."
