= Swedish jazz =

Music genre

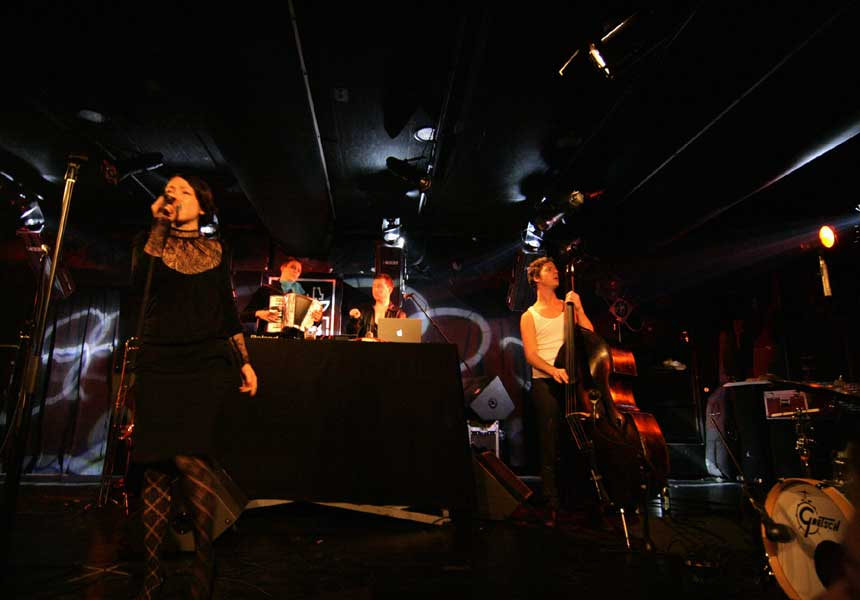
The Swedish electronic jazz group Koop live 2007

Jazz was introduced in Sweden during the 1920s, and was spread through dancehalls and concerts. During the 1930s and 1940s the popularity was increasing, together with increasing record sales. It was by this time that the first jazz clubs were started in Sweden.

The golden age of Swedish jazz is considered to be during the 1950s, with artists such as Arne Domnérus, Lars Gullin, Alice Babs and Monica Zetterlund performing.

East-West Records was a jazz record label active during the 1950s which featured American and Swedish musicians.

The Stockholm Jazz Festival was established in 1980.

== Musicians ==
- Jan Allan
- Harry Arnold
- Peter Asplund: Trumpeter, born 1969.
- Dan Berglund: Double bassist, born 1963.
- Magnus Broo
- Gunhild Carling
- Lars Danielsson
- Palle Danielsson
- Lars Jansson
- Lars Edegran
- Lisa Ekdahl
- Lars Erstrand
- Börje Fredriksson
- Daniel Fredriksson: Drummer, born 1976.
- Per-Ola Gadd: Double bassist, born 1962.
- Lars Gulliksson
- Lars Gullin
- Mats Gustafsson
- Rigmor Gustafsson
- Rune Gustafsson
- Bengt Hallberg
- Jonas Hellborg
- Jan Johansson
- Per "Ruskträsk" Johansson: Saxophonist, born 1969.
- Per "Texas" Johansson
- Anders Jormin
- Goran Kajfeš: Trumpeter, born 1970.
- Jacob Karlzon
- Orange Kellin
- Jonas Kullhammar
- Åke Hasselgård
- Nils Landgren
- Magnus Lindgren
- Joakim Milder: Saxophonist, born 1965.
- Sture Nordin
- Bent Persson
- Mats Rondin
- Bernt Rosengren
- Nils Sandström: Saxophonist, born 1942.
- Fredrika Stahl
- Bobo Stenson
- Esbjörn Svensson
- Gösta Törner
- Ulf Wakenius
- Per Henrik Wallin
- Putte Wickman
- Monica Zetterlund
- Anders Widmark: Pianist, born 1963.
- Magnus Öström: Drummer, born 1965.
- Rune Öfwerman

== Bands ==
- Koop
- The Torbjörn Zetterberg Hot Five
