= Jazz på ryska =

Studio album by Jan Johansson
- Released: 1967
- Genre: Jazz
- Label: Megafon

Jan Johansson chronology
Barnkammarmusik (1966)	Jazz på ryska (1967)	In Hamburg (1968)

Jazz på ryska ("Jazz in Russian") is an album by jazz pianist Jan Johansson. It was issued in 1967 and consists of jazz arrangements of Russian folk songs. The mixer at recording was Olof Swembel. The album was originally published by the record company Megafon. In 2005 a remastered version produced by disc label Heptagon Records was released, with six bonus tracks on the CD and the full recording sessions (around 100 minutes) in a data section as mp3 files.

Jazz på ryska and Jazz på svenska were also compiled together as the single CD Folkvisor in 1988, also reissued on Heptagon 1994.

== Track listings ==
Composer: traditional unless otherwise specified.

=== Original LP ===
1. Nära hemmet – 2:21
2. På ängen stod en björk (Vo polye bereza stojala) – 2:52 -
3. Stepp, min stepp (Polyushko-polye) – 3:45
4. Bandura – 2:25
5. Längs floden – 2:06
6. Det går en kosack – 1:23
7. Mellan branta stränder – 2:42
8. Pråmdragarnas sång på Volga (The Song of the Volga Boatmen) – 3:43
9. Jag broderade till gryningen – 1:53
10. Kvällar i Moskvas förstäder (Moscow Nights; music: Vasilij Solovjov-Sedoj / text: Michail Matusovskij) – 4:19
11. Entonigt klingar den lilla klockan – 1:56
12. Ströva omkring – 0:47

=== CD Edition (2005) ===
1. Stepp, min stepp – 3:45
2. Mellan branta stränder – 2:42
3. Pråmdragarnas sång på Volga – 3:43
4. På ängen stod en björk – 2:52
5. Nära hemmet – 2:21
6. Bandura – 2:25
7. Längs floden – 2:06
8. Ströva omkring – 0:47
9. Entonigt klingar den lilla klockan – 1:56
10. Det går en kosack – 1:23
11. Kvällar i Moskvas förstäder (music: Vasilij Solovjov-Sedoj / text: Michail Matusovskij) – 4:19
12. Jag broderade till gryningen – 1:53
13. Pråmdragarnas sång på Volga – 3:35
14. Längs floden – 2:24
15. Entonigt klingar den lilla klockan – 1:37
16. På ängen stod en björk – 2:43
17. Kvällar i Moskvas förstäder – 3:28
18. Det går en kosack – 2:20

Tracks 13–18 are bonus tracks with alternate takes.

== Contributors ==
- Jan Johansson – piano
- Georg Riedel – bass
- Egil Johansen – drums
- Arne Domnérus – clarinet
- Bosse Broberg – trumpet
- Lennart Åberg – tenor saxophone
