= Jan Allan =

Swedish jazz trumpeter and composer (born 1934)

Jan Bertil Allan (born 7 November 1934) is a Swedish jazz trumpeter and composer. He is the winner of a Grammis Award, the Swedish equivalent of the Grammys. He has also composed for several films such as The Adventures of Picasso (1978), Sopor (1981) and Trollkarlen (1999).

== Career ==
Allan was born 7 November 1934 in Falun, Sweden. He began his career in 1951 as a pianist; after moving to Stockholm, he changed to the trumpet as his main instrument. At this time he played in Carl-Henrik Norin's orchestra. From 1954 to 1955, he worked with Lars Gullin and Rolf Billberg and from 1955 to 1959 with Carl-Henrik Norin. At the same time, he earned a PhD in physics.

Despite his small number of records, Allan is among the most important modern jazz musicians in Sweden. From 1960 to 1963, he led a quintet with Billberg. Over the course of the 1960s, he worked with Arne Domnérus, Georg Riedel, and Bengt Hallberg, among others. From 1968 to 1975, he was a member of the Swedish Radio Jazz Group. His album Jan Allan -70, which featured Rolf Ericson, Nils Lindberg, Bobo Stenson, Jon Christensen, and Rune Gustafsson, won a Grammis Award for Jazz of the Year in 1970. Allan played with the same group and Georg Riedel on the trio-album Sweet And Loverly. His 1998 album Software stands in strong affinity with the West Coast Jazz of Gerry Mulligan and Stan Getz.

Over the course of his career, Allan recorded albums with Bosse Broberg, Benny Carter, Dorothy Donegan, Lars Gullin, Jan Johansson, Thad Jones, Roger Kellaway, Lee Konitz, Nils Lindberg, Georg Riedel, George Russell and Monica Zetterlund. In 2009, he was honored with a Swedish Golden Django as a Master of Jazz.

In 2000, his Bach trumpet, which was engraved with his name and he played for 35 years, was stolen. A movie about the theft and missing trumpet was broadcast on Swedish television in 2015; it had an audience of 1.1 million viewers.

== Discography ==
=== As leader ===
- 70 (MCA, 1970)
- Dialogic (Four Leaf Clover, 1982)
- Sweet and Lovely (Dragon, 1993)
- Jan2 (J.A.M., 1996)
- A Beautiful Friendship (J.A.M., 2000)
- Temptations of Freedom (J.A.M., 2001)
- The Idea of Sailing (J.A.M., 2005)
- Artwork: Two of a Kind (J.A.M., 2009)

=== As sideman ===
With Arne Domnerus

- The Sheik (Four Leaf Clover, 1979)
- A.D. 1980 (Phontastic, 1980)
- Brost-Toner (Four Leaf Clover, 1980)
- Blue and Yellow (Phontastic, 1982)
- Skyline Drive (Phontastic, 1983)
- Swedish Rhapsody (Phontastic, 1996)
- Arne Domnerus (Four Leaf Clover, 2000)

With Berndt Egerbladh

- Kristallen Den Fina (CBS, 1975)
- African Suite (Sonet, 1976)
- Night Pieces (LadyBird, 1996)

With Lars Gullin

- The Artistry of Lars Gullin (Sonet, 1958)
- Fine Together (Sonet, 1973)
- Aeros Aromatic Atomica Suite (EMI, 1976)
- Portrait of My Pals (Capitol, 2002)

With Nils Lindberg

- Trisection (Columbia, 1963)
- Reflections (Swedish Society, 1975)
- Brass Galore (Bluebell, 1981)
- Big Band Galore (Bluebell, 1984)

With George Russell

- The Essence of George Russell (Sonet, 1971)
- Vertical Form VI (Soul Note, 1981)
- New York Big Band (Soul Note, 1982)

With Monica Zetterlund

- Chicken Feathers (SR, 1972)
- Varsamt (RCA, 1991)
- Sweet Georgie Fame (Philips, 1992)
- Bill Remembered (BMG/RCA Victor, 2000)

With others

- Alice Babs, Music with a Jazz Flavour (Swedish Society, 1973)
- Alice Babs, Alice Babs Serenading Duke Ellington (Swedish Society, 1975)
- Rolf Billberg, We'll Be Together Again (Odeon, 1973)
- Dorothy Donegan, Dorothy Donegan (Four Leaf Clover, 1976)
- Rune Gustafsson, Move (Sonet, 1977)
- Rune Gustafsson, Standards (Eagle 1995)
- Bengt Hallberg, in New York (Phontastic, 1984)
- Gugge Hedrenius, Blues of Stockholm (Polar 1974)
- Jan Johansson & Georg Riedel, Rorelser (Megafon, 1963)
- Thad Jones, Thad and Aura (Four Leaf Clover, 1977)
- Roger Kellaway, That Was That (Dragon, 1991)
- Lee Konitz, Glad, Koonix! (Dragon, 1986)
- Karin Krog & Georgie Fame, On a Misty Night (Odin, 2018)
- Silje Nergaard, At First Light (EmArcy, 2001)
- Lars Sjosten, Dedicated to Lee (Dragon, 1984)
- Christina von Bulow, The Very Thought of You (Dragon, 1994)
- Cornelis Vreeswijk, Getinghonung (Philips, 1974)
- Sylvia Vrethammar, Stardust & Sunshine (Sonet, 1975)
- Bengt-Arne Wallin, The Magic Box (SR, 1971)
- Bengt-Arne Wallin, Varmluft (Sonet, 1972)
- Mike Westbrook, Fields and Forms (Musica Jazz, 2008)

== Sources ==
- Richard Cook & Brian Morton: The Penguin Guide to Jazz on CD. Sixth Edition, London, Penguin, 2002
- Leonard Feather, Ira Gitler: The Biographical Encyclopedia of Jazz. Oxford University Press, New York 1999, ISBN 0-19-532000-X.
