= Radiojazzgruppen =

Swedish jazz band

Radiojazzgruppen (The Radio Jazz Group) was a Swedish band led by Arne Domnérus (1967–78) and Lennart Åberg (early 1980s). Several prominent Swedish musicians have been members of the group, such as Ulf Andersson, Jan Allan, Bosse Broberg, Rolf Ericson, Olle Lind, Rune Gustafsson, Bengt Hallberg, Egil Johansen, Jan Johansson and Georg Riedel.

During the 1970s and 80s the band worked with guest musicians and composers such as Carla Bley, Anthony Braxton, Don Cherry, Gil Evans, Thad Jones, George Russell and Aage Tanggaard.

== Discography ==
=== CD ===
- 1968/1991 - Den korta fristen. Jan Johansson and Radiojazzgruppen. Megafon MFCD-101.
