= Zhenya Gershman =

American painter

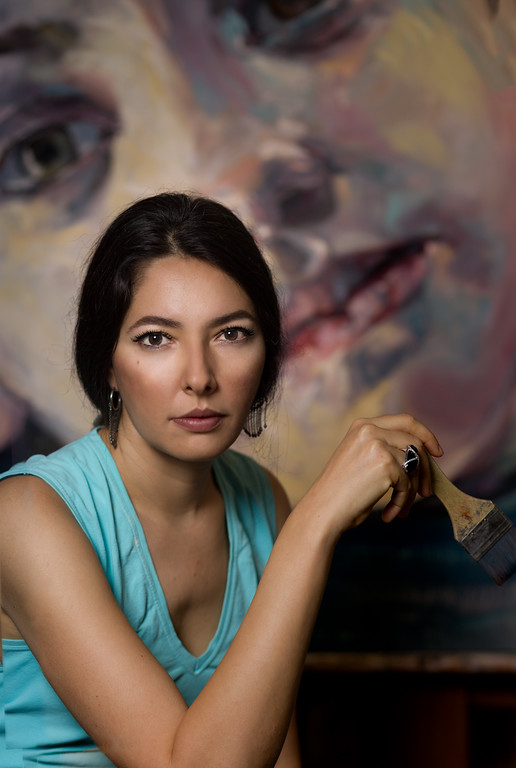
- Gershman in her studio, 2014
- Education: Otis Art Institute (BFA); Art Center College of Design (MFA)
- Style: Painting, portrait
- Relatives: Mikhail Matusovsky (grandfather)

Zhenya Gershman is an American painter and portraitist. She is known for her "dramatic monumental portraits of iconic public and private figures" and interest in art history.

== Early life ==
Her grandfather Mikhail Matusovsky was an award-winning Ukrainian-born poet and lyricist who authored the lyrics to the song "Moscow Nights". Gershman held her first solo painting exhibition at the age of 14 in Saint Petersburg. She received her BFA from Otis Art Institute with honors and MFA from Art Center College of Design. Gershman's early mentor was Soviet artist and illustrator Orest Vereisky and she later studied under the guidance of American artist Lita Albuquerque.

== Artist ==
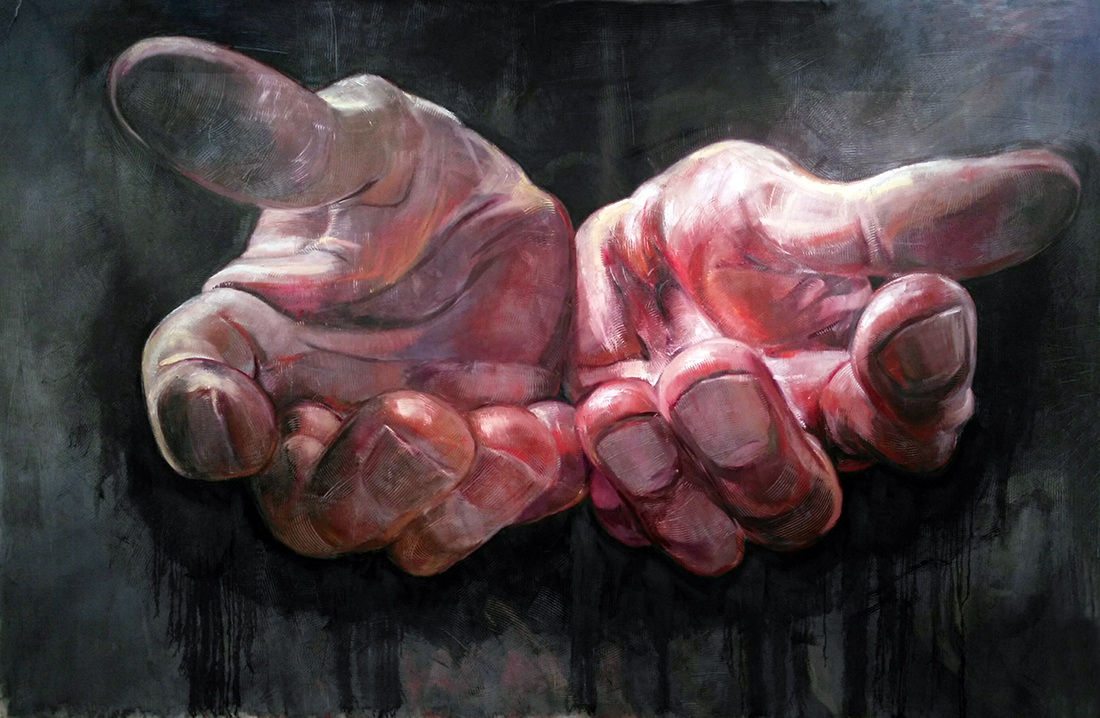
Lift, 2017, oil on canvas, 130 x 98 in.

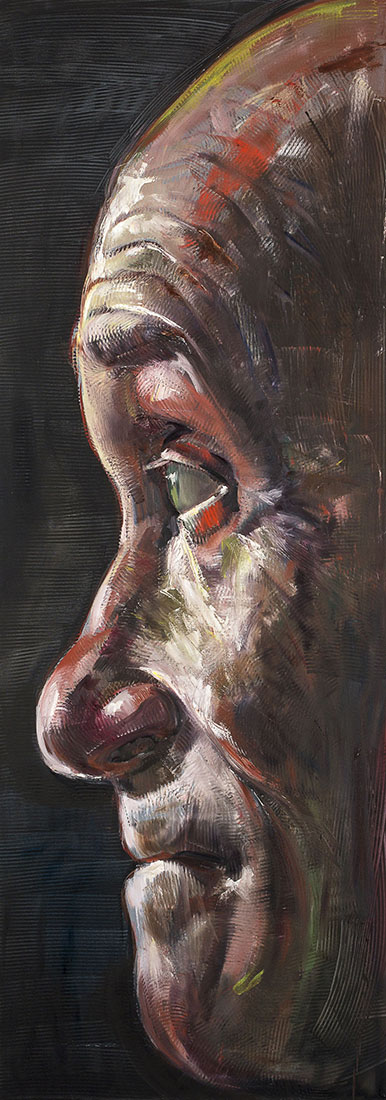
Graven, 2017, oil on canvas, 84 x 30 in.

Gershman's portraits are featured in public and private collections including Douglas Simon, Richard Weisman (she is included in the book "Picasso to Pop: The Richard Weisman Collection") and the J. Paul Getty Research Institute. Gershman's portrait of Sting is part of the permanent collection of the Arte Al Limite Museum, due to open in 2017 in Santiago, Chile. The GRAMMY MusiCares selected Gershman to create portraits of Bruce Springsteen and Bob Dylan. A documentary film, The Model's Artist, highlights Gershman's innovative approach to working with artists' models. In 2000, Gershman was a recipient of ALEX Award in Visual Arts from The National Alliance for Excellence, Honored Scholars and Artists Program, presented by Peter Frank, who is quoted as saying that

Gershman’s effort evokes not only Whistler’s and Sargent’s, but that from which they took inspiration, Manet’s and Velazquez’s–masters of the figure who in their own ways avoided the banal literalities of their contemporaries for a rendition truer to the vagaries of vision, and (thereby) to the dynamics of human presence.

In 2021 Gershman was named an Ambassador to art materials company Royal Talens North America and art supply business BLICK Art Materials. Gershman's "First Face of War: Intimate Portrait of Ukrainian Teacher" sold for $100,000 at the Heritage Auctions with 100% of proceeds from the sale benefiting Ukraine during the 2022 humanitarian crisis. Gershman's painting depicts Ukrainian school teacher Olena Kurilo, who was wounded by shelling in Chuhuiv during the Russian invasion of Ukraine. The painting was modeled from a photograph of a wounded Kurilo which was taken by photojournalist Wolfgang Schwan, and inspired the creation of a movement by Zhenya, called Brushes Over Bullets. In her project 'Brushes over Bullets', Gershman encourages other artists to paint in solidarity with Ukraine. Gershman has said that she intentionally made her "First Face of War" small in size, so that observers are forced to take a closer and more intimate look into the eyes and faces of her subjects.

== Other ==
In addition to her artistic career, Gershman is an independent scholar and a museum educator. Gershman's identification of a figure in Rembrandt's painting Danaë as a possible self-portrait was discussed in Le Monde. She is a founder and host of the Invisible Museum Tours video series.
