= Visa från Utanmyra =

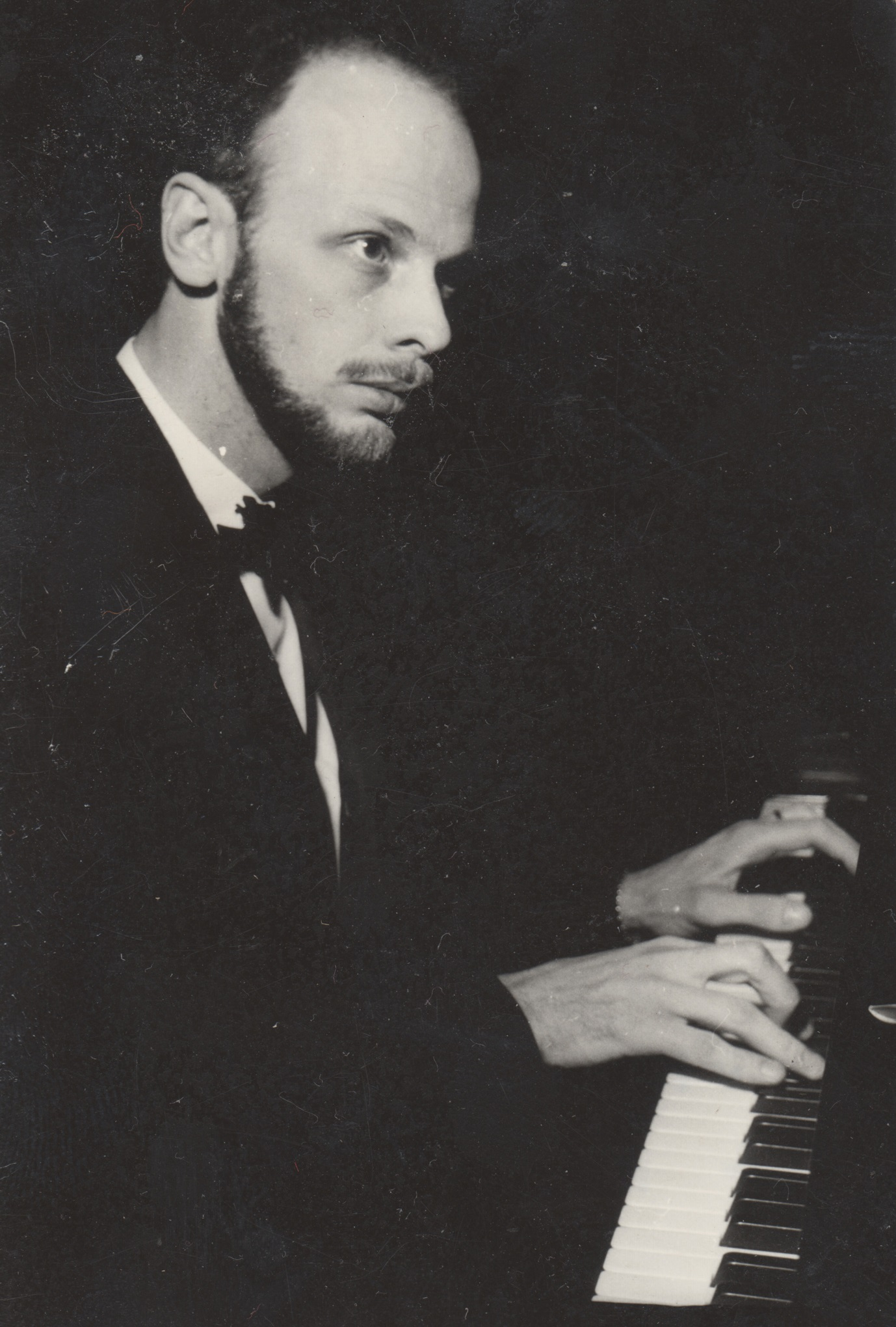
Jan Johansson, a Swedish jazz pianist famous for his interpretation of Visa från Utanmyra

"Visa från Utanmyra" (English: Song from Utanmyra) is a traditional Swedish folk song written as a melody to two separate texts. The first text, entitled O tysta ensamhet (translated: Oh Silent Solitude), was written by Olof von Dalin. The second text, entitled Visa från Utanmyra, was written by Björn Lindroth. Lindroth's text is perhaps the best-known version today. Utanmyra is a småort village located in Sollerön, Dalarna, Sweden.

The song has been played in a jazz context and interpreted by several artists, including Arne Domnérus, Monica Zetterlund, Wintergatan and Jan Johansson. Johansson's version was featured on his seminal 1964 album Jazz på svenska.

Jan Johansson's version of the song was used in Svenska för Nybörjare (Swedish for Beginners), a recurring sketch on the TV program Hipphipp!.

Swedish folktronica band Wintergatan covered the song in 2014.
