= Håkan von Eichwald =

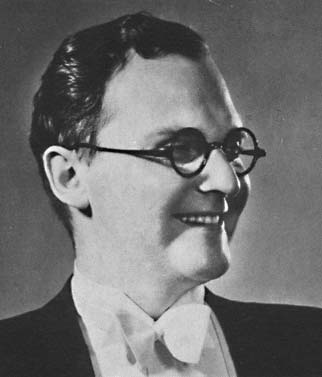
Håkan von Eichwald.

Håkan Ingvar von Eichwald (2 April 1908 – 1 May 1964) was a Finnish-Swedish bandleader and conductor. He led dance bands which featured some of Sweden's most prominent early jazz musicians, and later became a conductor of symphonic and operatic works.

Von Eichwald was born into a Russian-Finnish noble family in Turku, Finland, but lived most of his life in Sweden. He learned to play piano as a toddler and was playing public concerts at age six. By his late teens he was leading theater ensembles in Stockholm, and in 1930 began leading a dance band at the club Kaos. He led this group until 1932 and recorded with it; two years later, Arne Hülphers took over this group. He formed a new ensemble in 1936, which toured western Europe and recorded several times. Von Eichwald's ensembles featured musicians who were pivotal to Swedish jazz, including Charlie Norman, Thore Ehrling, Zilas Görling, and Gösta Theselius.

After the 1940s, von Eichwald devoted himself to more formal music idioms. He led symphony orchestras and conducted light opera productions, and also did work in scoring Swedish films (including Jack of Hearts). He died in Malmö.
