= Rune Gustafsson =

Swedish jazz guitarist and composer (1933–2012)

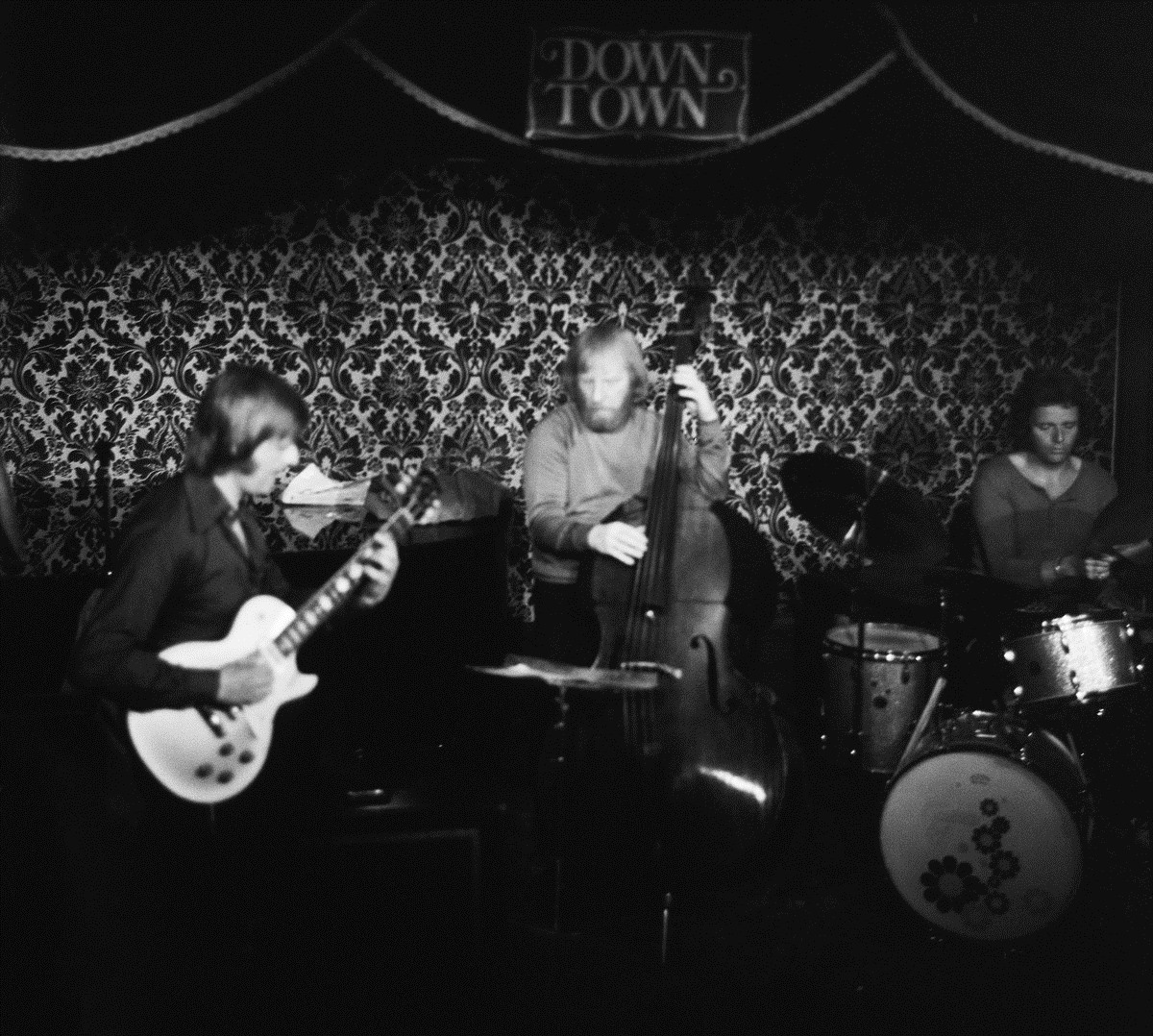
- Rune Gustafsson, Red Mitchell and Egil "Bop" Johansen playing at the "Down Town Jazzklubb" in 1972. (Photo: Ørsted, Henrik / Oslo Museum)

Background information
- Born: Rune Urban Gustafsson; 25 August 1933; Gothenburg, Sweden
- Origin: Sweden
- Died: 15 June 2012 (aged 78) Stockholm, Sweden
- Genres: Jazz
- Occupations: Musician, guitarist, composer
- Instrument: Guitar

Rune Urban Gustafsson (25 August 1933 – 15 June 2012) was a Swedish jazz guitarist and composer. He performed with Arne Domnérus, Jan Johansson, and Zoot Sims among others.

== Life and career ==
Rune Gustafsson was born in 1933 in Gothenburg. He moved to Stockholm in the 1950s to work with Putte Wickman (Swedisk Jazz Kings, EP, 1957) and Arne Domnérus Radio band and Radio Jazz Group. His first issued recordings were Young Guitar (Metronome, MLP 15 072, 1961) with Arne Domnérus, Jan Johansson, Jimmy Woode, Bjarne Nerem, Börje Fredriksson and Jan Allan.

Rune at the Top was released in 1969 and included the Norwegian drummer Jon Christensen. He played in the Arne Domnérus duo (Dialog, 1972) and his orchestras, with Jan Johansson, Georg Riedel, Cornelis Vreeswijk. Rune Gustafsson Himself Plays Gilbert O'Sullivan (1973), Killing Me Softly (1973) and Move (1977), was recorded with Egil Johansen, who was one of Gustafsson's most frequent musical partners. On a Clear Day (Sonet, SLP 2581, 1976) included Red Mitchell and drummer Ed Thigpen. He played with Zoot Sims on two recordings: The Sweetest Sounds (1979) and In a Sentimental Mood (1985), the latter was Sims last album. A duo performance with Niels-Henning Ørsted Pedersen at Vossajazz 1980, concluded on the album Just The Way You Are on the Sonet, recorded half a year after this first meeting.

As a composer he was known for the soundtrack of Swedish films The Man Who Quit Smoking (1972), Release the Prisoners to Spring (1975), and Sunday's Children (1992).

Rune Gustafsson died in 2012 in Stockholm after a short illness.

== Awards ==
Gustafsson received the Albin Hagstrom Memorial Prize in 1997, The Thore Ehrling Scholarship in 2001, and Guitar People's Prize in 2004. In 2009 he was awarded the Lars Gullin Award, for having been "the trend for young guitarists in Sweden and abroad". In 2010, he was awarded the Monica Zetterlund memorial fund scholarship.

== Discography ==
=== Solo albums ===
- 1961: Young Guitar (Metronome)
- 1969: Rune at the Top (Metronome)
- 1972: Himself (Plays Gilbert O'Sullivan) (Sonet)
- 1973: Killing Me Softly (Sonet)
- 1974: Out of My Bag (Sonet)
- 1975: Plays Stevie Wonder (Sonet)
- 1976: On a Clear Day (Sonet)
- 1977: Move (Sonet)
- 1979: The Sweetest Sounds (Sonet) – with Zoot Sims
- 1980: Just the Way You Are (Sonet) – with Niels-Henning Ørsted Pedersen
- 1982: La Musique (Sonet)
- 1989: String Along with Basie (Sonet)
- 1993: Rune Gustafsson (Eagle)

=== Collaborations ===
With Arne Domnérus

- 1972: Dialog (Megafon)
- 1974: Svarta Får (Sonet)
- 1979: Jazz I Kyrkan (Sonet)
- 1979: Vårat Gäng (Sonet)
- 1983: Conversation (Polar)
- 1983: "Altihop" (Phontastic) – with Visby Big Band
- 1992: Sketches of Standards (Megafon)
- 1994: Heartfelt (Proprius) – including with Gustaf Sjökvist

With Zoot Sims

- 1985: In a Sentimental Mood (Sonet)

With Jan Allan and Georg Riedel

- 1993: Sweet and Lovely (Dragon)

=== Soundtracks ===
- 1972: The Man Who Quit Smoking
- 1975: Release the Prisoners to Spring
- 1992: Sunday's Children
