= Görling =

Görling is a Swedish surname. Notable people with this surname include:

- Adolph Görling (1820–1877), German journalist and author
- Felix Görling (1860-1932), German sculptor and painter
- Miff Görling (1909–1988), Swedish musician
- Nathan Görling (1905–2002), Swedish musician
- Zilas Görling (1911–1960), Swedish musician
