= Carli Tornehave =

Swedish singer and actor

- Born: 26 August 1932; Stockholm, Sweden
- Genres: Schlager
- Occupations: Singer actor
- Years active: 1950s-

Carli Tornehave (born 26 August 1932, in Stockholm), is a Swedish/Danish singer and actor.

Tornehave was born in Stockholm, but grew up in Denmark, where he and his family moved when he was four years old. He started playing music at an early age, playing several instruments and becoming a member of the Copenhagen Boys' Choir and later the Tivoli Orchestra.

He returned to Sweden at the age of 18. In 1954 he won a vocal competition in Stockholm, where he came into contact with the Swedish musician and entertainer Charlie Norman and sang with his orchestra for a few years, which included several tours of the folk parks. He also appeared in a few feature films. As a singer he has been called "Sweden's Frank Sinatra".

Tornehave made his recording debut in 1958 with "Första gången", the Swedish version of the Italian smash hit Come Prima.

He has participated at Melodifestivalen six times; in 1962 he performed Anneli and När min vän, in 1963 he performed Twist till menuett and En gång i Stockholm. The song "En gång i Stockholm" won the contest, but Monica Zetterlund was appointed to represent Sweden in the Eurovision Song Contest in London. In 1966, he performed Monte Carlo and Härliga söndag ending on second and eighth place respectively.

== Discography ==
=== Albums ===
Year	Title		
Year	Title	1955	Klappa Din Hand (En Kväll På Hamburger Börs) (with Monica Zetterlund, Birgitta Andersson, Hans Lindgren)
Carli		1955	
1956	Monja Och 10 Andra Populära Melodier Ur Carli Tornehaves Aktuella Repertoar		
1956	En Gång Jag Seglar I Hamn Och Andra Stig Olin-Melodier		
1956	Gershwin - Evergreen! (28 George Gershwin Songs) (With Lena Ericsson)		
1957	Who´s Harry Warren? - Evergreen!. Vol. 1: Jeepers Creepers (With Harry Warren, Pamela Knowles, Arne Domnérus, Bengt Hallberg, Ove Lind And His Swedish All Stars)		
1957	Who's Harry Warren? - Evergreen! (With Pamela Knowles and Harry Warren)		
"—" denotes the single failed to chart or was not released.

- Hård stad (Rough Road by Lee Hazlewood) – 1961
- Angelique
- Den enda i världen
- En natt i Moskva
- Lykkeliten
- Gotländsk sommarnatt
- Monte Carlo
- När min vän kommer tillbaka (with Monica Zetterlund)
- Under ekars djupa grönska
- Mexican Shuffle

== Filmography ==
- 1961 – Åsa-Nisse bland grevar och baroner
- 1962 – Raggargänget
- 1964 – Wild West Story
- 1965 – För vänskaps skull as the singer
- 1968 – Sarons ros och gubbarna i Knohult
- 1978 – Dante - akta're för Hajen!
