= East-West Records =

US record label; imprint of Atlantic records

East-West Records was a jazz record label which released four albums from 1956 to 1958 featuring a combination of American and Swedish jazz musicians.

East-West was a division of Atlantic Records. The small catalog was produced by Nesuhi Ertegun.

Lars Gullin's Swings was reissued in 1999 on Collectables Records, paired with his 1956 album Baritone Sax.

== Discography ==
#	Artist	Album	Year	Personnel
4001	Tommy Potter	Tommy Potter's Hard Funk	1956	Rolf Ericson, Benny Bailey, Åke Persson, Gunnar Bjorksten, Stig Gabrielsson, Erik Nostrom, Freddie Redd, Joe Harris
4002	Jackie Paris	The Jackie Paris Sound	1958	Barry Galbraith, Wendell Marshall, Joe Benjamin
4003	Lars Gullin	Swings	1958	Arne Domnérus (alto saxophone); Rolf Blomquist, Carl-Henrik Norin (tenor saxophone); Rune Falk (baritone saxophone); Weine Rehnliden, Bengt-Arne Wallin, Jan Allan, Nils Skoog (trumpet); Åke Persson, George Vernon, Gordon Olsson (trombone); Rune Ofwerman (piano); Bengt Carlsson, George Riedel (bass); Nils-Bertil Dahlander (drums)
4004	George Wallington	The Prestidigitator	1957	Teddy Kotick, J. R. Monterose, Nick Stabulas
