= Gösta Theselius =

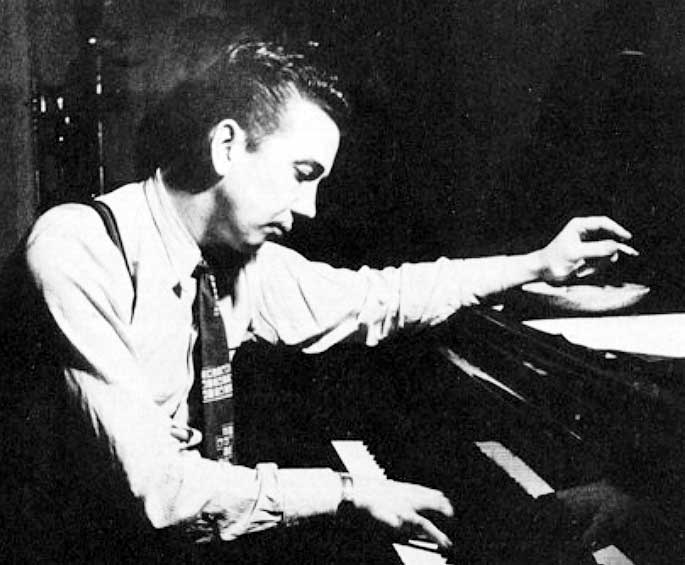
Gosta Theselius c.1950

Gösta Theselius (9 June 1922 – 24 January 1976) was a Swedish arranger, composer, film scorer, pianist, and saxophonist.

Theselius was born in Stockholm. His brother was musician Hans Theselius.

Theselius worked in the 1940s with a number of European big bands, including those of Thore Jederby, Håkan von Eichwald, Sam Samson, Lulle Elboj, and Thore Ehrling. He played jazz into the 1950s, both as a saxophonist and a pianist (on the latter instrument with Benny Bailey, Arne Domnerus, James Moody, and Charlie Parker), and composed copiously for film in the 1950s and 1960s.

Theselius died in Stockholm in 1976.

== Film soundtracks ==
- 1942 – Olycksfågeln nr 13
- 1951 – Uppdrag i Korea
- 1955 – Flicka i kasern
- 1955 – Paradise
- 1956 – Suss gott
- 1956 – The Stranger from the Sky
- 1956 – Flamman
- 1956 – Blånande hav
- 1957 – The Halo Is Slipping
- 1957 – Räkna med bråk
- 1960 – Kärlekens decimaler
- 1961 – Karneval
- 1961 – Två levande och en död
