= Egil Johansen (musician) =

Norwegian-Swedish jazz drummer

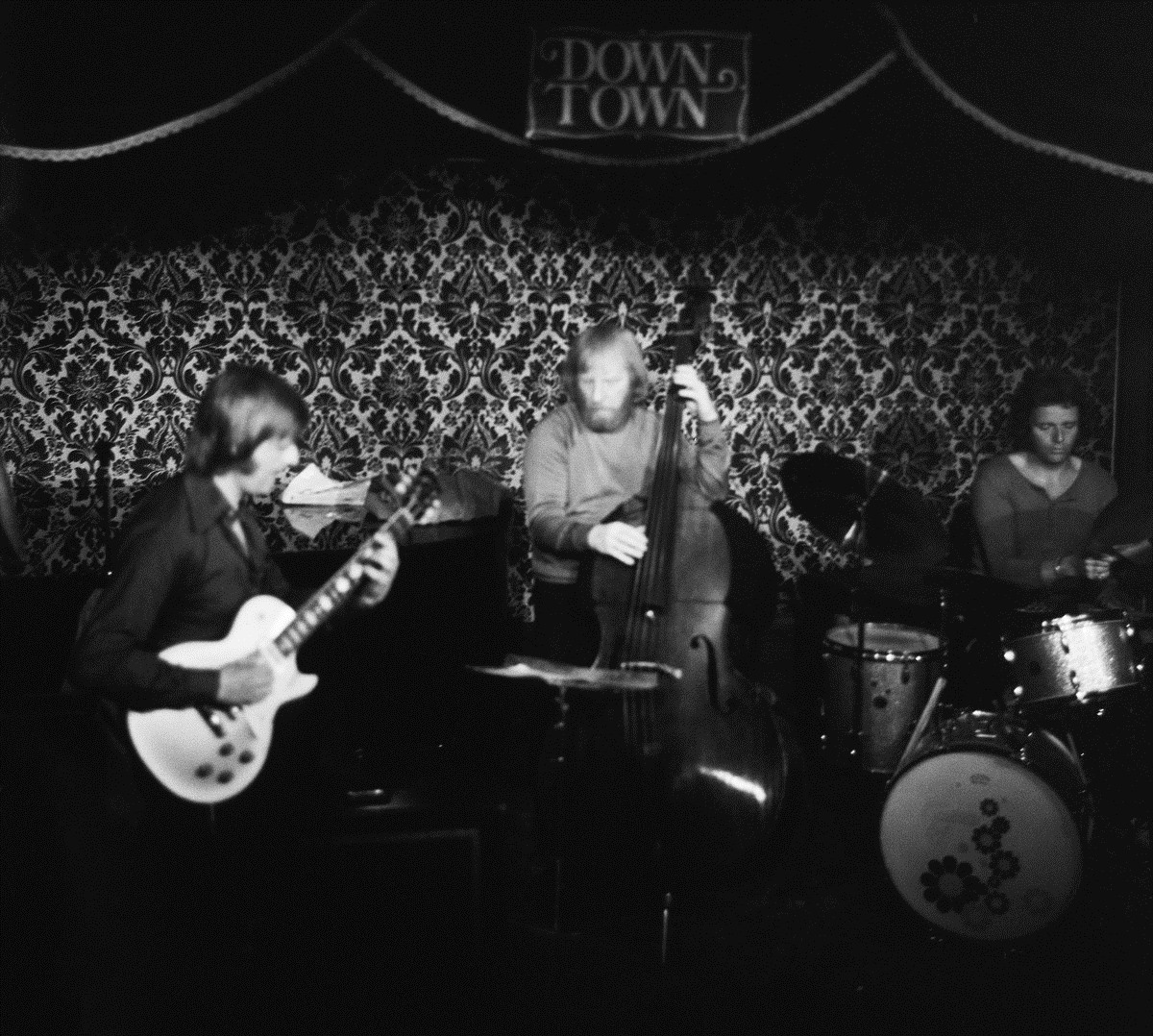
- Johansen to the right with Rune Gustafsson and Red Mitchell at Down Town, Oslo 1972.

Background information
- Also known as: Bop
- Born: 11 January 1934; Oslo, Norway
- Died: 4 December 1998 (aged 64) Nyköping, Sweden
- Genres: Jazz
- Occupations: Musician, composer
- Instrument: Drums

Egil "Bop" Johansen (11 January 1934 – 4 December 1998) was a Norwegian-Swedish jazz drummer, teacher, composer, and arranger.

== Life ==
Johansen was born in Oslo. He was considered already in his teens as one of the best drummers and was a professional musician from the age of 16. He received the nickname "Bop" because he was especially good at playing bebop. He was always open to the new styles of jazz that he encountered. His professional career started in Einar Stenberg’s orchestra in the summer of 1950 with Svalerødkilens badhotell and continued in the autumn with Svaes Danseskole, after which he joined Egil Monn-Iversen’s orchestra and Kjell Johansen’s experimental band for 1951-1953. He played in Rowland Greenberg’s orchestra in 1952.

He moved to Sweden in 1954 at the invitation of Simon Brehm. He entered immediately into collaboration with the Swedish jazz elite of Arne Domnérus, Bengt Hallberg, Rune Gustafsson, Georg Riedel, Jan Johansson and others, among others in Radiojazzgrupen. In 1957 he took part in the Rune Öfwerman Trio in a classic recording with the clarinetist Tony Scott in Swinging in Sweden.

Under the leadership of Harry Arnold Johansen collaborated in several classic recordings with world stars like Quincy Jones, for example on 1958's Quincy's home again. During the 1960s, Egil Johansen was a heavily touring musician foremost with the Arne Domnérus Orchestra and participating also among other things together with Alice Babs, in a commission for Swedish UN troops entertainment detail in Gaza and later on Cyprus. He was also from 1973-1983 the initiator of and responsible for the cooperative Jazz Incorporated. Johansen played on Jazz at the Pawnshop in 1977.

He was without hesitation one of the most significant jazz musicians in postwar Sweden. He played also from 1985 to 1998 with the Norwegian group Brazz Brothers and with them played over 1,200 concerts.

In 1993 he was awarded the prestigious "Buddy Prize," the highest honor a jazz musician can receive in Norway.

He performed also as a singer, among others in Hasse & Tage's revue Spader madame, where he sang the very funny "En sång som handlar om sig själv" (“A song about itself”).

Johansen was a devoted sailor and tennis player. He was the father of the singer Jan Johansen.

== Honors ==
- 1993: Buddyprisen

== Discography ==
- Nana - Soundtrack (1970)

With Jan Johansson

- Jazz på ryska (Megafon, 1967)

With Benny Golson

- Stockholm Sojourn (Prestige, 1974)

With Quincy Jones

- Quincy's Home Again (Metronome, 1958) - also released as Harry Arnold + Big Band + Quincy Jones = Jazz! (EmArcy)

With Lee Konitz

- Glad, Koonix! (Dragon, 1983 [1986])

With Herbie Mann

- Mann in the Morning (Prestige, 1956 [1958])

With Jimmy Witherspoon

- Some of My Best Friends Are the Blues (Prestige, 1964)

== Selected filmography ==
- The Dance Hall (1955)

== Sources ==
- Myggans nöjeslexikon
- Nationalencyklopedin

Awards
Preceded by Morten Gunnar Larsen	Recipient of the Buddyprisen; 1993	Succeeded by Bjørn Kjellemyr
Preceded by Totti Bergh	Recipient of the Jazz Gammleng-prisen; 1995	Succeeded by Ole Jacob Hansen

This article is based on a translation of the corresponding article on the Swedish Wikipedia.
