= Glad, Koonix! =

Live album by Lee Konitz
- Released: 1986
- Recorded: November 5 & 7, 1983
- Venue: Arvika and Stockholm, Sweden
- Genre: Jazz
- Label: Dragon; DRLP 104
- Producer: Lars Westin

Lee Konitz chronology
Art of the Duo (1983)	Glad, Koonix! (1986)	Dedicated to Lee (1983)

Glad, Koonix! (subtitled Lee Konitz Live in Sweden) is a live album by saxophonist Lee Konitz which was recorded in Sweden in 1983 and released on the Dragon label.

== Critical reception ==
Professional ratings
Review scores
Source	Rating
Allmusic	4/5 stars

The Allmusic review stated "Somehow Lee Konitz never sounds stale and his solos (even on tunes he had been playing for over 30 years) still have a strong amount of curiosity and wonderment in them. His fans will enjoy this fine straightahead session".

== Track listing ==
1. "Hi-Beck" (Lee Konitz) – 7:15
2. "Lover Man" (Jimmy Davis, Roger ("Ram") Ramirez, James Sherman) – 5:10
3. "A Child Is Born" (Thad Jones) – 4:40
4. "No Mind at All" (Göran Strandberg) – 6:00
5. "Cherokee" (Ray Noble) – 8:05
6. "Changing from Meter to Centimeter" (Strandberg) – 4:45
7. "Body and Soul" (Johnny Green) – 9:20

== Personnel ==
- Lee Konitz – alto saxophone, soprano saxophone
- Jan Allan – trumpet
- Utsava Göran Strandberg – piano
- Sture Nordin – bass
- Egil Johansen – drums
