= The Sweetest Sounds =

The Sweetest Sounds may refer to:

- "The Sweetest Sounds" (song), a 1962 song by Richard Rodgers
- The Sweetest Sounds (Ilse Huizinga album), 2001
- The Sweetest Sounds (Rune Gustafsson and Zoot Sims album), 1979
