= Lars Sjösten =

Swedish jazz pianist and composer

Lars Sjösten (7 May 1941 – October 2011) was a Swedish jazz pianist and composer.

Sjösten was born in Oskarshamn. During the 1960s, he often worked at the jazz restaurant The Golden Circle in Stockholm. He performed with many jazz musicians including Ben Webster, Dexter Gordon, Art Farmer, Wayne Shorter, and Bernt Rosengren. He was the first person to receive the Jan Johansson prize in 1969.

Sjösten also played in Lars Gullin's groups. Sjösten and Gullin became friends and in 1997, Sjösten was given the inaugural Lars Gullin Prize, for his work within the musical heritage of Lars Gullin.

Through the years, Sjösten led his own groups and worked as a freelancer and a composer. He recorded with the musicians Benny Bailey, Rolf Ericson, Bjarne Nerem, Lee Konitz, and Putte Wickman, Gordon, Webster, Gullin, and Rosengren. He has made tours to Paris, Moscow, Vittoria da Praia (the Azores), and within Sweden.

== Discography ==
With Dexter Gordon

- The Rainbow People (Steeplechase, 1974 [2002]) – with Benny Bailey
