= Jazz at the Pawnshop =

1977 live music album

Live album by Arne Domnérus, alto sax, clarinet; Bengt Hallberg, piano; Lars Erstrand, vibes; Georg Riedel, bass; and Egil Johansen, drums
- Released: 1977
- Recorded: December 6–7, 1976 Jazzpuben Stampen
- Genre: Jazz
- Length: 1:28:06
- Label: Proprius Records
- Producer: Jacob Boethius

Jazz at the Pawnshop is a multi-session recording made by Gert Palmcrantz on December 6–7, 1976, at Jazzpuben Stampen (Pawnshop) in Stockholm, Sweden. A pawnshop had operated on the site prior to the jazz club. Proprius Records founder Jacob Boethius produced the album, and it has been issued at least five times under multiple labels and formats. The album is regarded by many audiophiles as one of the best sounding jazz recordings of the 20th Century.

== Artists ==
The recording features Arne Domnérus, alto sax, clarinet; Bengt Hallberg, piano; Lars Erstrand, vibes; Georg Riedel, bass; and Egil Johansen, drums.

== Original release ==
Proprius Records originally released a 180-gram, 2-LP vinyl recording (Prop 7778-79) in 1977. This version of the album featured the following tracks:

=== Disc 1 ===
Track	Title	Time
1	Introduction/Limehouse Blues	10:14
2	I'm Confessin'	8:03
3	High Life	7:11
4	Struttin' With Some Barbeque	6:37
5	Jeep's Blues	6:59
6	Stuffy	7:05

=== Disc 2 ===
Track	Title	Time
1	Lady be Good	9:32
2	Here's That Rainy Day	5:29
3	Barbados	8:28
4	How High the Moon	6:14
5	Take Five	6:58
6	Everything Happens to Me	5:16
