= Putte Wickman =

Swedish jazz clarinetist (1924–2006)

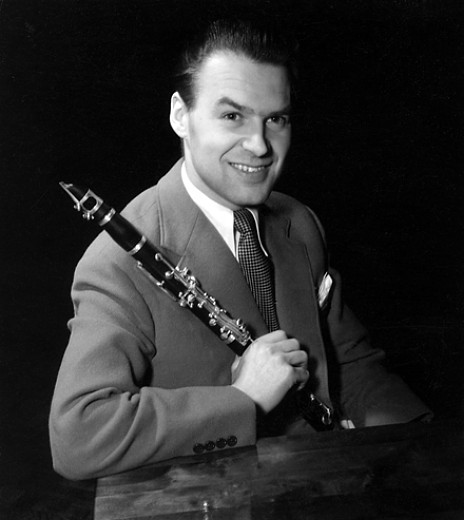
Wickman in the 1960s

Hans Olof "Putte" Wickman (10 September 1924 – 14 February 2006) was a Swedish jazz clarinetist.

== Career ==
Born Hans Olof Wickman in Falun, he grew up in Borlänge, Sweden, where his parents hoped he would become a lawyer. He nagged them to allow him to go to high school in Stockholm. When he arrived in the capital he still did not know what jazz was, and said in an interview many years later he was probably the only 15-year-old who did not. Since he did not have access to a piano in Stockholm, he was given a clarinet by his mother as a Christmas present – a life-changing event, as it turned out, as by then he had started to hang out with "the worst elements in the class – those with jazz records".

Artie Shaw and Benny Goodman were the role models for the young Wickman, who, already in 1944, had turned to music full-time. He was taken on as band leader at Stockholm's Nalen and in 1945 the newly founded Swedish newspaper Expressen described him as the country's foremost clarinet player. Wickman considered himself self-taught; he never took classes on the instrument.

He led a band at Nalen for eleven years, and during the 1960s he ran the big band at Gröna Lund and at Puttes, the club he co-owned, at Hornstull in Stockholm. In interviews in his later years, it was clear that he rated his church performances very highly. He was until shortly before his death still active as a musician, giving concerts every year. The technique and tone was still of the highest class, as was the well-pressed suit with a white handkerchief in the breast pocket.

In 1994, Wickman received the Illis Quorum gold medal, today the highest award that can be conferred upon a private Swedish citizen by the government of Sweden. Wickman was a member of the Royal Swedish Academy of Music.

== Discography ==
- Putte Wickman (Jockey, 1973)
- Happy New Year! (EMI/Odeon, 1973)
- Dansa Med Putte (Swedisc, 1974)
- Live at the Ahus Jazz Festival (EMI/Odeon, 1975)
- Live in Stockholm (Out, 1977)
- Some Enchanted Music by Richard Rodgers (Bluebell of Sweden, 1982)
- Putte Wickman & Sivuca (Four Leaf Clover 1982)
- 1949–1952 (Cupol, 1984)
- Desire (Four Leaf Clover, 1984)
- Mr Clarinet (Four Leaf Clover, 1985)
- Live in Gothenburg (Four Leaf Clover, 1986)
- Memories of You (Phontastic, 1986)
- Miss Oidipus with Hal Galper (Phontastic 1987)
- The Very Thought of You with Red Mitchell (Phontastic 1988)
- A Fine Together (Phontastic, 1991)
- In Silhouette (Phontastic, 1995)
- On a Friday (RCA, 1995)
- Simple Isn't Easy (Proprius, 1995)
- Live at the Pawnshop (Phontastic, 1996)
- Back to the Future (RCA Victor, 1997)
- Django D'or (Gazell, 1999)
- The Champs with Buddy DeFranco (Gazell 1999)
- We Will Always Be Together with Jan Lundgren (Gazell 2004)
- An Intimate Salute to Frankie with Jan Lundgren (Gazell 2005)
- Kinda Dukish with Ernie Wilkins (Gazell 2005)

=== As sideman ===
With Arne Domnerus

- Blue and Yellow (Phontastic, 1982)
- Skyline Drive (Phontastic, 1983)
- Live (Lady Bird, 1996)

With Nils Lindberg

- Lapponian Suite (Bluebell of Sweden, 1982)
- Shall I Compare Thee to a Summer's Day (Bluebell of Sweden, 1986)
- 7 Dalecarlian Paintings (Swedish Society, 1987)

With Thore Swanerud

- More Than You Know (Phontastic, 1985)
- Star Dust (Phontastic, 1986)
- On the Sunny Side (Beaver, 1987)

With others

- Harry Arnold, Harry Arnold Jazz Show Live 1959 (Ancha, 1993)
- Harry Arnold, Premiar! (Ancha, 1994)
- Susanne Alfvengren, Tidens Hjul (Hawk, 1988)
- Svend Asmussen, Musik I Kyrkan (EMI, 1975)
- Svend Asmussen, Niels-Henning Ørsted Pedersen, Telemann Today (Polydor, 1976)
- Alice Babs, Charlie Norman, Anders Berglund, Swingtime Again (RCA Victor, 1998)
- Berndt Egerbladh, TwoSome (Lady Bird, 1998)
- Leonard Feather, Leonard Feather & The Swinging Swedes (Cupol, 1974)
- Lars Gullin, 1959/60 Vol 4 Stockholm Street (Dragon, 1998)
- Thore Jederby, Bas: Thore Jederby (Odeon, 1970)
- Asa Jinder, Inom Mig Log Hjartat (Eagle 1989)
- Sofia Kallgren, Mina Sanger (Big Bag, 1994)
- Roger Kellaway, Red Mitchell, Some O' This and Some O' That (Phontastic, 1990)
- John Lewis, Red Mitchell, The John Lewis Album (Finesse, 1987)
- Silje Nergaard, Port of Call (EmArcy, 2000)
- Joe Newman, Counting Five in Sweden (Metronome, 1966)
- Povel Ramel, Wenche Myhre, PoW Show (Knappupp, 2005)
- Georg Riedel, Kirbitz (Phontastic, 1985)
- Sivuca, Sivuca Med Putte Wickmans Orkester (Interdisc, 1968)
- Sylvia Vrethammar, Georgie Fame, In Goodmansland (Sonet, 1983)
- Bengt-Arne Wallin, Nils Landgren, Miles from Duke (Phono Suecia, 1986)
- Roy Williams, Royal Trombone (Phontastic, 1984)
- Roy Williams, Again! Roy Williams in Sweden (Phontastic, 1987)
