= Hagge Geigert =

Swedish entertainer (1925–2000)

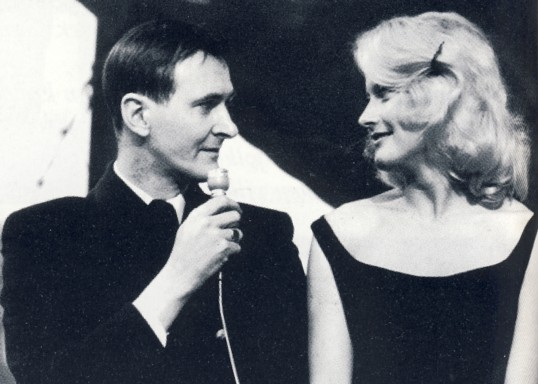
- Geigert and Monica Zetterlund

Elof Gösta Harry "Hagge" Geigert (born Johansson; 30 June 1925 – 14 February 2000) was a Swedish revue-writer, theater director, television entertainer, author, journalist and debater.

== Biography ==
He was born in Lerdal, Dalsland, Sweden. In television he participated in several entertainment-topic shows. In 1958 he presented Måndagsposten on SVT, in 1975 he presented the talk show Gäst hos Hagge, among his guests were Lill-Babs, Anni-Frid Lyngstad, Agnetha Fältskog and Anita Ekberg.

During several years he wrote columns for Göteborgs-Posten, several of his columns was re-published in the book Hagge på hugget in 1990.

Between 1965 and 1997, he was leader of the Lisebergsteatern in Gothenburg, where he would direct and participate in Hagges revy as a yearly tradition.

He was awarded the Illis quorum in 1998.

Geigert died in Gothenburg in 2000.
