= Art of the Duo (Lee Konitz and Albert Mangelsdorff album) =

Studio album by Lee Konitz and Albert Mangelsdorff
- Released: 1988
- Recorded: June 8–10, 1983
- Studio: MPS Tonstudio, Villingen, Black Forest, West Germany
- Genre: Jazz
- Length: 40:28
- Label: Enja enja 5059
- Producer: Horst Weber and Peter Wiessmueller

Lee Konitz chronology
Dovetail (1983)	Art of the Duo (1988)	Glad, Koonix! (1983)

Albert Mangelsdorff chronology
Two Is Company... (1982)	Art of the Duo (1983)	Hot Hut (1985)

Art of the Duo is an album by saxophonist Lee Konitz and trombonist Albert Mangelsdorff recorded in West Germany in 1983 but not released on the Enja label until 1988.

== Critical reception ==
Professional ratings
Review scores
Source	Rating
Allmusic	2.5/5 stars

David Dupont on Allmusic said "Konitz has long espoused the belief that horn players can swing without a rhythm section, yet much of the time Mangelsdorff insists on serving as a faux bass – really, tuba – player. And when he uses his patented technique of singing into his horn while creating chords, he functions as a very simple guitar player. That said, anything with these two masters on it has its pleasures. Konitz creates tasty lines with souffle-like lightness, and when Mangelsdorff breaks free he provides some gruff, complementary solos".

== Track listing ==
All compositions by Lee Konitz except where noted.

1. "Hot Hut" (Albert Mangelsdorff) – 4:05
2. "She's as Wild as Springtime" – 3:17
3. "Inclination" (Mangelsdorff) – 5:03
4. "I Wonder What She's Doing Right Now" – 2:04
5. "Creole Love Call" (Duke Ellington) – 4:05
6. "About Time We Looked at This" – 1:55
7. "A-Minor Blues in F" – 3:16
8. "Matti's Matter" (Mangelsdorff) – 7:43
9. "Cher Ami" (Konitz, Mangelsdorff) – 2:54
10. "En Passant" (Mangelsdorff) – 2:27
11. "Bloas" – 3:39

== Personnel ==
- Lee Konitz – alto saxophone
- Albert Mangelsdorff – trombone
