= Zilas Görling =

Swedish saxophonist (1911–1960)

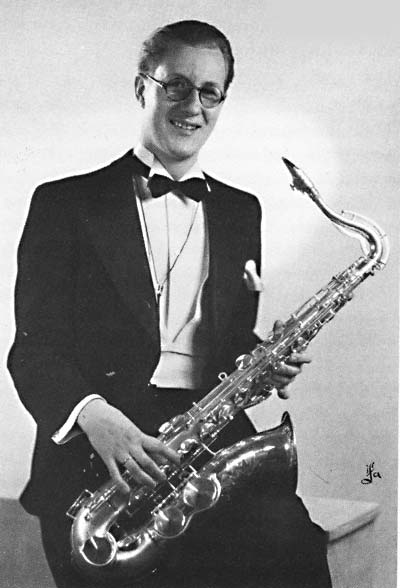
Zilas Görling

Karl Zilas Görling (21 April 1911 – 11 April 1960) was a Swedish jazz saxophonist. He was born in Hudiksvall, and his brother was Miff Görling.

The Görling brothers both played in Frank Vernon's band in the late 1920s and early 1930s. Zilas Görling also played in the TOGO group (sv) throughout the 1930s. From 1934 to 1938 Görling was in Arne Hülphers's band. He then joined Sune Lundwall's group for most of the duration of World War II. His other associations included work with Dick de Pauw, Charles Redland, Håkan von Eichwald, Helge Lindberg, Benny Carter, Thore Jederby, and Gösta Törner. He died in Stockholm.
