= Imported from Europe =

Studio album by Stan Getz
- Released: 1959
- Recorded: August 26 and September 15 & 16, 1958; Stockholm, Sweden
- Genre: Jazz
- Length: 36:50
- Label: Verve; MGV 8331

Stan Getz chronology
Stan Meets Chet (1958)	Imported from Europe (1959)	Stan Getz at Large (1960)

Imported from Europe is an album by saxophonist Stan Getz, released on the Verve label in 1959.

== Reception ==
The AllMusic review by Jason Ankeny stated: "Imported from Europe channels the frosty ambience of its geographic origins to create one of Getz's most evocative efforts -- a decisively modern and cerebral session, it's nevertheless humanized by the warm, rich tone of Getz's tenor sax".

Professional ratings
Review scores
Source	Rating
AllMusic	4/5 stars
DownBeat	3.5/5 stars

== Track listing ==
1. "Bengt's Blues" (Bengt Hallberg) - 4:15
2. "Honeysuckle Rose" (Fats Waller, Andy Razaf) - 6:43
3. "They Can't Take That Away from Me" (George Gershwin, Ira Gershwin) - 7:18
4. "Topsy" (Edgar Battle, Eddie Durham) - 6:25
5. "Like Someone in Love" (Jimmy Van Heusen, Johnny Burke) - 4:15
6. "Speak Low" (Kurt Weill, Ogden Nash) - 3:42
7. "Stockholm Street" (Lars Gullin) - 4:12
- Recorded in Stockholm, Sweden on August 26, 1958 (tracks 2–4), September 15, 1958 (tracks 5 & 6) and September 16, 1958 (tracks 1 & 7)

== Personnel ==
- Stan Getz - tenor saxophone
- Benny Bailey - trumpet
- Åke Persson - trombone
- Bjarne Nerem (tracks 6 & 7), Erik Nordström - tenor saxophone
- Lars Gullin - baritone saxophone
- Bengt Hallberg (tracks 1 & 5–7), Jan Johansson (tracks 2–4) - piano
- Gunnar Johnson - bass
- William Schiopffe - drums
