= Moscow Nights =

Soviet Russian song

Song
- Released: 1956
- Recorded: 1956
- Composer: Vasily Solovyov-Sedoy
- Lyricist: Mikhail Matusovsky

"Moscow Nights", (Note: Russian: Подмосковные вечера, romanized: Podmoskóvnye vecherá, IPA: [pədmɐˈskovnɨje vʲɪtɕɪˈra]) originally titled "Leningrad Nights", (Note: Russian: Ленинградские вечера, romanized: Leningrádskiye vecherá, IPA: [lʲɪnʲɪnˈɡratskʲɪje vʲɪtɕɪˈra]) is a Soviet patriotic song written by Mikhail Matusovsky and composed by Vasily Solovyov-Sedoy. It was later covered as "Midnight in Moscow" by Kenny Ball.

== Composition and initial success ==
Composer Vasily Solovyov-Sedoy and poet Mikhail Matusovsky wrote the song in 1955 under the title "Leningrad Nights". At the request of the Soviet Ministry of Culture, the song was renamed "Moscow Nights" with corresponding changes to the lyrics.

In 1956, "Moscow Nights" was recorded by Vladimir Troshin, a young actor of the Moscow Art Theatre, for a scene in a documentary about the Russian Soviet Federative Socialist Republic's athletic competition Spartakiad in which the athletes rest in Podmoskovye, the Moscow suburbs. The film did nothing to promote the song, but thanks to radio broadcasts it gained popularity.

== Covers ==
"Midnight in Moscow"

Single by Kenny Ball
- B-side: "My Mother's Eyes" (UK); "American Patrol" (US)
- Released: October 1961 (UK); January 1962 (US)
- Recorded: 1961
- Genre: Easy listening
- Length: 2:59
- Label: Kapp
- Songwriters: Vasily Solovyov-Sedoy; Mikhail Matusovsky; Kenny Ball

In Finnish, Moscow Nights has been performed under name "Unohtumaton Ilta (Unforgettable Evening)" by numerous artists, one earliest being Estonian singer Georg Ots in 1958 (also in Russian). Some other example singers include Eino Grön, Tapio Rautavaara, and Reijo Taipale.

The Dutch jazz group New Orleans Syncopators recorded the arrangement of the song under the title 'Midnight in Moscow', arranged by its leader Jan Burgers on January 4, 1961. The arrangement of Jan Burgers was published by Les Editions Int. Basart N.V. and was also used by Kenny Ball and his Jazzmen, who recorded the song in November 1961, also under the title "Midnight in Moscow". This version peaked at number two on the UK Singles Chart in January 1962. "Midnight in Moscow" also reached number two on the U.S. Billboard Hot 100 chart in March that year, kept out of the number one spot by "Hey! Baby" by Bruce Channel, and it spent three weeks at number one on the American Easy Listening chart.

In 1962, at the height of the folk revival in the United States, the song was recorded by The Chad Mitchell Trio on their popular live performance album At the Bitter End on Kapp Records. The group introduced the song with its original Russian lyrics to the American mainstream audience during the Cold War era of strained relations between the U.S. and the USSR.

In 1962, American singer and actress Ketty Lester recorded the song for her Love Letters album.

In 1964 a rendition of the song by Ukrainian tenor Anatoliy Solovianenko was awarded 3rd place in the Italian variety TV show Napoli contro tutti. The song gained popularity in Italy and an Italian version titled Mezzanotte a Mosca was recorded by some Italian choir ensembles.

Swedish pianist Jan Johansson recorded a jazz version of the song for his 1967 album Jazz på ryska. This version was titled "Kvällar i Moskvas Förstäder" which translates to "Evenings in Moscow's suburbs".

A version of the song was recorded by James Last and appears on his Russland zwischen Tag und Nacht album.

The Chinese composer Gao Ping used the song in 2003 as the basis for one of his Soviet Love Songs for Vocalising Pianist, "Evenings in Suburban Moscow."

In 2015, the Massed Bands of the Moscow Garrison, under the direction of Lieutenant General Valery Khalilov, performed a march arrangement of the song during the march past of foreign contingents (specifically those from Azerbaijan, Armenia, Belarus and Kazakhstan) in the Moscow Victory Day Parade that year.

== Place in Soviet culture ==
The shortwave radio station Radio Moscow's English-language service has played an instrumental jazz big-band version of "Moscow Nights" between informing listeners of frequency changes and the hourly newscast since the start of its 24-hour English Service in 1978.

== In American popular culture ==
The lyrics were shown on 9 March 2017 in Cyrillic script as the vanity card of The Big Bang Theory episode "The Escape Hatch Identification" (Season 10 Episode 18). It was used once again on 5 April 2018, as card number 585, but the second line of the song was missing.

== See also ==
- List of Billboard Middle-Road Singles number ones of 1962
