= Börje Fredriksson =

Swedish jazz musician (1937–1968)

Börje Fredriksson (June 30, 1937 – September 21, 1968) was a Swedish jazz tenor saxophonist.

Fredriksson was born in Eskilstuna, Sweden. He played at the beginning of the 1960s in a quartet with Bobo Stenson (piano), Palle Danielsson (bass) and Fredrik Norén (drums), as well as in groups with Eje Thelin and Bernt Rosengren. He played with the guitarist Rune Gustafsson in 1961 and with Bosse Broberg's quartet in 1962 at the Golden Circle Jazz Club in Stockholm. He recorded Intervall, (Columbia 1966), together with the posthumous, self-titled Börje Fredriksson, (EMI/Odeon, 1969). In 1968, he killed himself.

Fredriksson's sheet music was left in the hands of Bobo Stenson, and in 1994 he, Danielsson and Norén with saxophonist Joakim Milder, recorded an album of Fredriksson's music entitled Sister Maj's Blouse. A sequel, Epilogue, appeared in 1998 with the same ensemble.
