= The Sweetest Sounds (Rune Gustafsson and Zoot Sims album) =

Studio album by Rune Gustafsson and Zoot Sims
- Released: 1979
- Recorded: November 28–29, 1978
- Studio: CI Recording Studios, New York City, NY
- Genre: Jazz
- Length: 41:59
- Label: Pablo Today; 2312 106
- Producer: Rune Ötwerman

Rune Gustafsson chronology
Move (1977)	The Sweetest Sounds (1979)	Just the Way You Are (1980)

Zoot Sims chronology
Warm Tenor (1978)	The Sweetest Sounds (1979)	Just Friends (1980)

The Sweetest Sounds is an album by Swedish guitarist Rune Gustafsson with American saxophonist Zoot Sims recorded in late 1978 released by the Pablo Today label in the United States and Sonet Records in Sweden in 1979.

== Reception ==
Professional ratings
Review scores
Source	Rating
AllMusic	3/5 stars
DownBeat	4/5 stars

AllMusic reviewer Dave Nathan stated: "That this get together was a relaxed affair (as things usually were with Sims) is very apparent. The eight-song program includes nothing adventurous that would require much thinking or musical dexterity on the part of these experienced musicians. The many moods which characterized Sims' playing are evident here ... All in all, this was an entirely satisfactory proceeding".

DownBeat assigned the album 5 stars. Reviewer Pete Welding wrote, "Easy-listening modern mainstream jazz at its beguiling best is what is served up in this program of flawlessly played, perfectly relaxed and always swinging performances . . . The ageless, transcendent music making of this group will continue to enchant for years to come".

== Track listing ==
1. "The Sweetest Sounds" (Richard Rodgers) – 4:00
2. "Goodbye Yellow Brick Road" (Elton John, Bernie Taupin) – 4:45
3. "Stompin' at the Savoy" (Edgar Sampson, Benny Goodman, Chick Webb, Andy Razaf) – 7:54
4. "My Favourite Things" (Rodgers, Oscar Hammerstein II) – 4:40
5. "Waters of March (Aguas de Marco)" (Antônio Carlos Jobim) – 5:25
6. "Indentation" (Erik Nordström) – 4:50
7. "I'm Gettin' Sentimental Over You" (George Bassman, Ned Washington) – 5:45
8. "A Song for You" (Leon Russell) – 4:40

== Personnel ==
- Rune Gustafsson, Bucky Pizzarelli – guitar
- Zoot Sims – tenor saxophone
- George Mraz – bass
- Peter Donald – drums
