= Dragon Records =

Swedish record label

- Founded: 1975
- Founder: Jan Wallgren; Lars Westin
- Genre: Jazz
- Country of origin: Sweden
- Official website: www.dragonrecords.se

Dragon Records is a Swedish record company and label established in 1975 by journalist Lars Westin (born 1948) and pianist Jan Wallgren (1935-1996). It concentrates on Swedish jazz. As of 2002, the company was run by Westin.

Dragon has issued several hundred albums by Swedish jazz musicians, both historic and contemporary recordings, and aural documentation of visits to Sweden by American musicians, among others including Stan Getz, Sonny Rollins, Thelonious Monk and Lee Konitz. The label has issued a series of CDs by Lars Gullin featuring much of his recordings from the 1950s (at present, January 2018, eleven volumes have been released). It also released a four-CD set of visits by Miles Davis with John Coltrane and Sonny Stitt in 1960 and 1961.

The company should not be confused with a different company that released Sisqó's albums in mid-1999 to 2002.

In the movie Jerry Maguire, the concert referred to with Miles Davis and John Coltrane is the Dragon release. This recording is incorrectly called a bootleg in Ascension: John Coltrane and His Quest, a biography of Coltrane by Eric Nisenson.

== See also ==
- List of record labels
