= Jazz på svenska =

- Cover of 2005 reissue

Studio album by Jan Johansson
- Released: 1964
- Recorded: 28 February 1962, 18 October 1963, 6 May 1964 (Stockholm, Sweden)
- Genre: Jazz
- Length: 33:46
- Label: Megafon / Heptagon Records (2005 reissue)

Jan Johansson chronology
Rörelser (1963)	Jazz på svenska (1964)	Jazz på ungerska (1964)

Alternative cover

Jazz på svenska ("Jazz in Swedish") is an album by the Swedish jazz pianist Jan Johansson. It was issued in 1964 and consists of jazz arrangements of Swedish folk songs. All arrangements are very sparse, consisting only of Johansson on piano and Georg Riedel on double bass. It went on to become the best selling Swedish jazz album of all time, selling a quarter of a million copies. Many of the tracks hold a distinct renown in Swedish society, especially the lead track "Visa från Utanmyra" (Song from Utanmyra).

In 2005 a remastered version produced by disc label Heptagon Records was released with four bonus tracks on the CD and the full recording sessions (109 minutes) in a data section as mp3 files.

== Track listing ==
All tracks are written by Jan Johansson.

No.	Title	Length
1.	"Visa från Utanmyra"	4:30
2.	"Gånglek från Älvdalen"	1:56
3.	"Polska från Medelpad"	2:27
4.	"Visa från Rättvik"	3:18
5.	"Brudmarsch efter Larshöga Jonke"	2:00
6.	"Vallåt från Jämtland"	1:51
7.	"Emigrantvisa"	3:25
8.	"Berg-Kirstis polska"	3:25
9.	"Leksands skänklåt"	2:56
10.	"Gammal bröllopsmarsch"	3:41
11.	"Visa från Järna"	1:18
12.	"Polska efter Höök Olle"	2:24
Total length:		33:46

== Personnel ==
Main personnel

- Jan Johansson – piano, arrangements
- Georg Riedel – double bass

Additional personnel

- Olof Svembel – engineer
- Tor Alm – Artwork
- Ingmar Glanzelius – liner notes
