= Bosse Broberg =

Swedish jazz trumpeter and composer (1937–2023)

Bo Lennart "Bosse" Broberg (6 September 1937 – 26 August 2023) was a Swedish jazz trumpeter and composer.

Broberg was born Ludvika. He learned to play accordion as a child and switched to trumpet aged 14. He studied music at the University of Uppsala and performed there in his own small ensemble in a hard bop idiom. He worked for many years with Gugge Hedrenius beginning in the early 1960s, and was with Arne Domnerus from 1964 to 1968; he also worked with Börje Fredriksson and Jan Johansson. He took leadership of Sveriges Radio's jazz programming in 1966, keeping the position to 1990; he founded the radiojazzgruppen in 1967 and composed and arranged for the orchestra. He played with Red Mitchell from 1971 to 1982 and with the Sandviken Big Band from 1975 to 1985. In the 1980s, he worked with Christer Boustedt and Åke Johansson. He formed a big band in 1995 called Nogenja Jazz Soloist Ensemble. The group's name is a condensation of No Generation Jazz. He won a Django d'Or in 2005.
