= Miff Görling =

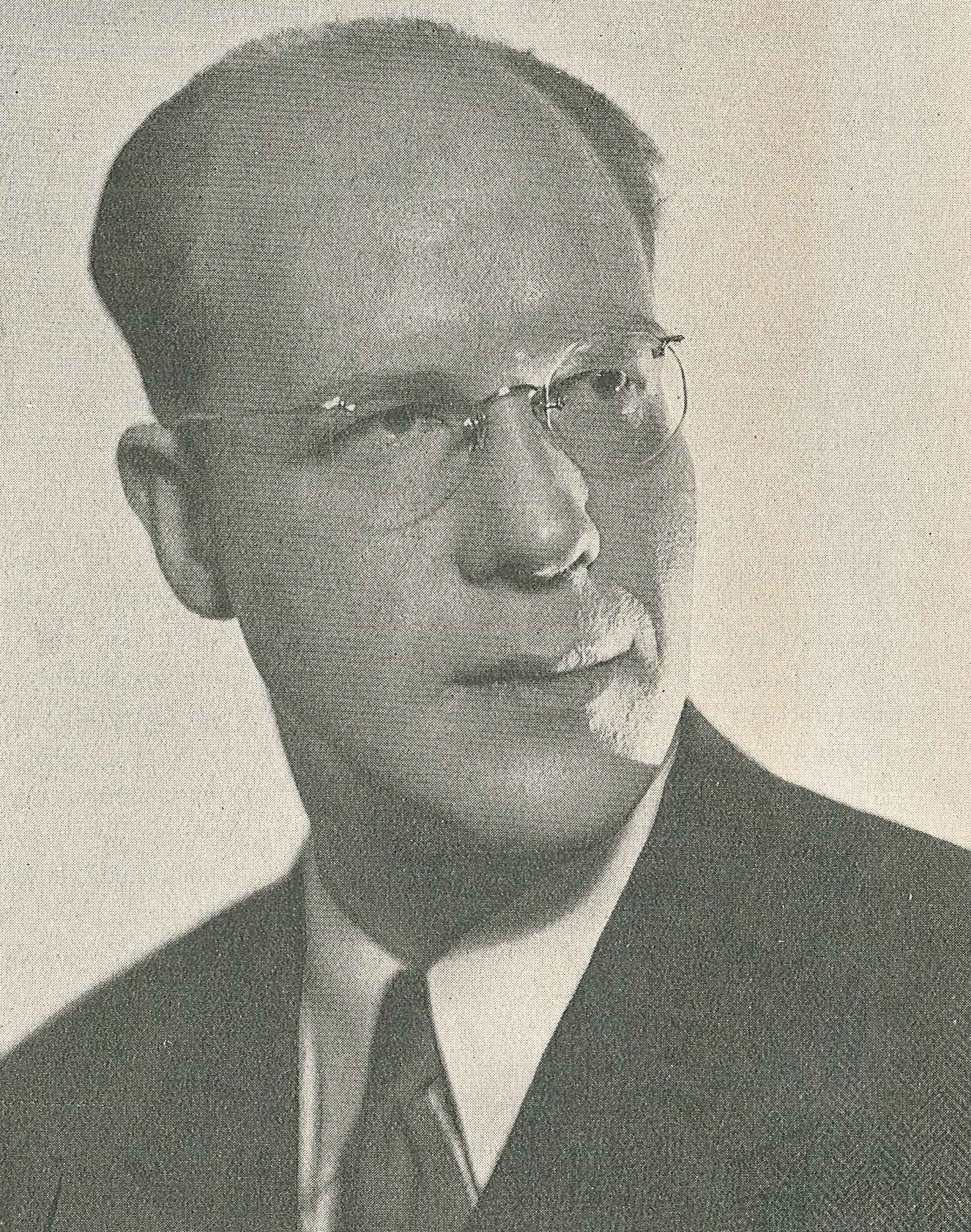
Miff Görling.

Uno "Miff" Görling (21 March 1909 – 24 February 1988) was a Swedish jazz bandleader, trombonist, arranger, and composer. His brother was Zilas Görling.

Görling was born and died in Stockholm. He took his nickname from trombonist Miff Mole, and got his start in the late 1920s with Frank Vernon's orchestra, where he played until 1932. He then worked with Arne Hülphers, Gösta Jonsson, Seymour Österwall, and Gösta Säfbom before organizing his own ensemble in 1938. He led bands into the 1950s, and also did arrangement and composition work for other jazz groups as well as for popular Swedish musicians.
