= Gugge Hedrenius =

Görjen "Gugge" Hedrenius (October 2, 1938, Malmö - April 27, 2009, Stockholm) was a Swedish jazz pianist and bandleader.

Hedrenius was active in dixieland revival groups from his teens. He led a small group from 1959 to 1965 that included Idrees Sulieman and Bosse Broberg as sidemen. In 1971 he reinitiated the group as a big band and recorded under the name Big Blues Band, playing in Stockholm with the group into the 1990s and touring the United States in 1988. In Stockholm he led a jazz performing society called Gugge's Ballroom which arranged performances and hosted touring musicians, including Willie Cook, Joe Newman, Dizzy Gillespie, Mel Lewis, Teddy Edwards, Jimmy Witherspoon, and Hank Crawford.
