= Arne Hülphers =

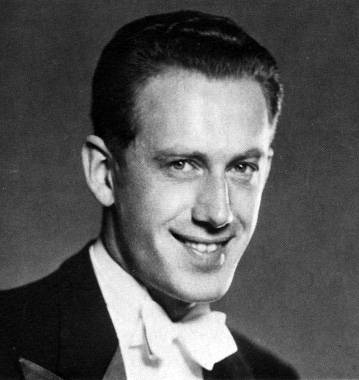
Arne Hülphers

Arne Gunnar Valter Hülphers (4 April 1904, Trollhättan – 24 July 1978, Norrköping Municipality) was a Swedish jazz pianist and bandleader.

Hülphers played early in his career at the club Felix-Kronprinsen, from 1924 to 1927, and played in dance bands in Sweden into the early 1930s. He founded his own ensemble in 1934 which became one of Sweden's most important jazz big bands, touring Europe and recording until 1940. Sidemen in his group included Miff Görling, Zilas Görling, and Thore Jederby. Later in his career, he concentrated more on popular musical styles; he led an orchestra in which Fred Bertelmann played, and in 1956 married singer Zarah Leander, whom he had previously accompanied as bandleader. They were married until his death in 1978.
