= Mikhail Matusovsky =

Soviet poet (1915–1990)

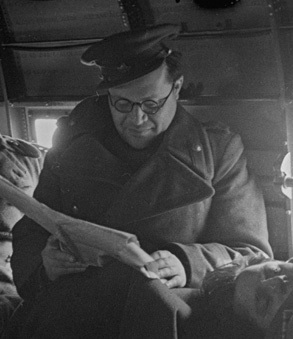
Matusovsky in 1945

Mikhail Lvovich Matusovsky (Russian: Михаил Львович Матусовский; 23 July 1915 in Lugansk – 16 July 1990 in Moscow) was a Soviet and Russian poet, screenwriter, translator and war correspondent. Laureate of the USSR State Prize (1977).

== Biography ==
Mikhail Lvovich Matusovsky was born in Luhansk, Yekaterinoslav Governorate, Russian Empire in the Jewish family of photographer Lev Matusovsky. After graduating from Maxim Gorky Literature Institute (1939, PhD 1941), he participated in the Great Patriotic War, as a war correspondent. He was a member of the Union of Soviet Writers since 1939.

He is famous for his lyric poems many of which became lyrics of the popular songs: "School Waltz", "In the Damp Earth-Huts", "The Sacred Stone", "The Windows of Moscow", "Don't Forget" and "Moscow Nights" which was sung at the Moscow Youth Festival in 1957 and was played also by the American pianist Van Cliburn in the White House in 1979, on the occasion of a visit by the former President of the USSR, Mikhail Gorbachev. This song made an entry into the "Guinness Book of World Records" as the song most frequently sang all over the world. In March 1962 a record made by Kenny Ball reached #2 on the U.S. Billboard Hot 100 chart, and the UK Singles Chart.

Among the books: anthologies of poems "The People of Lugansk: A Book of Poems and Prosa" (1939), "My Genealogy" (1940), "Front: A Book of Poems" (1942), "A Song About Aidogdi Takhirov and Andrey Savushkin" (1943), "When Ilmen Lake Makes a Stir" (1944), "Poems" (1946), "Listening to Moscow: Poems" (1948), "The Street of Peace: Poems" (1951), "Everything That I Value: Poems and Songs" (1957), "The Poems Are Always With Us" (1958), "The Windows of Moscow: Poems and Songs" (1960), "How Are You, Earth: A book of Poems and Songs" (1963), "Don't Forget: Songs" (1964), "A shadow of a Man: A Book About Hiroshima" (1968), "It Was Recently, It Was Long Ago: Poems" (1970),"The Essence: Poetry and Poems" (1979), "Selected Works: in Two Volumes" (1982) and the memoirs "The Family Album" (1979).

== Awards and honors ==
- Medal "For the Defence of Moscow"
- Medal "For the Victory over Germany in the Great Patriotic War 1941–1945"
- Order of the October Revolution
- Order of the Red Star (1942)
- Two Orders of the Patriotic War, 1st class (1945, 1985)
- Two Orders of the Red Banner of Labour (1965, 1975)
- USSR State Prize (1977)
