= Monica Zetterlund =

Swedish jazz singer and actress (1937–2005)

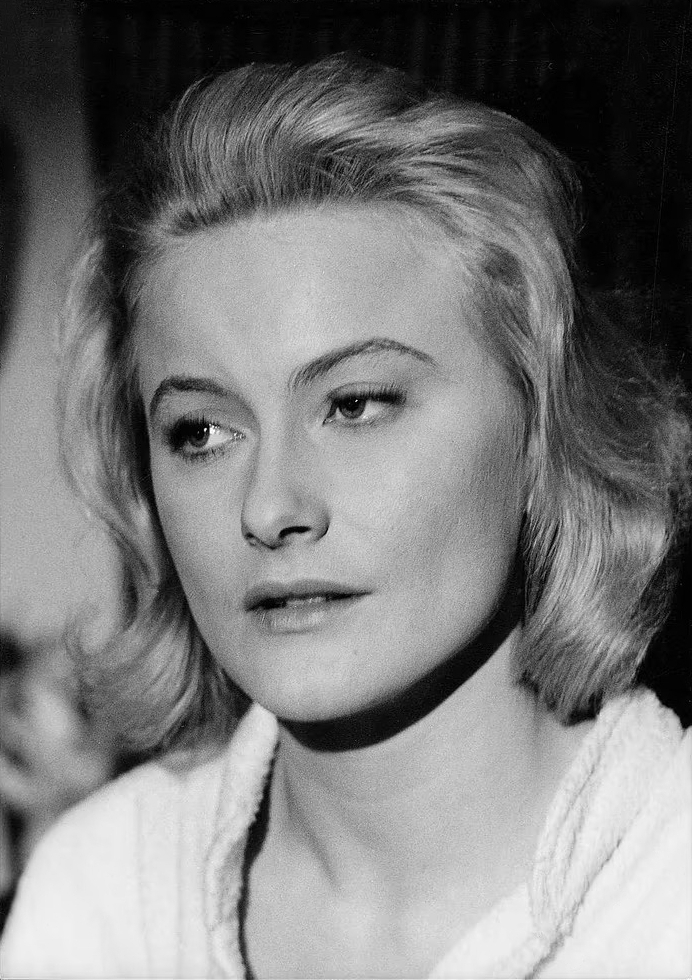
- Zetterlund in the 1960s

Background information
- Born: Eva Monica Nilsson; 20 September 1937; Hagfors, Sweden
- Died: 12 May 2005 (aged 67) Stockholm, Sweden
- Genres: Vocal jazz
- Occupations: Singer, actress
- Years active: 1958–1999

Monica Zetterlund (born Eva Monica Nilsson; 20 September 1937 – 12 May 2005) was a Swedish jazz singer and actress. She represented represented Sweden in the Eurovision Song Contest 1963 with the jazz ballad "En gång i Stockholm" ("Once Upon a Time in Stockholm"). Through her lifetime, she starred in over 10 Swedish film productions and recorded over 20 studio albums. She gained international fame through her collaborative album with Bill Evans, Waltz for Debby.

== Career ==
=== Singer ===
Zetterlund began by learning the classic jazz songs from radio and records, initially not knowing the language and what they sang about in English. Her hit songs included "Sakta vi gå genom stan" (Swedish cover of "Walking My Baby Back Home"; in Swedish a tribute to Stockholm town), "Visa från Utanmyra", "Sista jäntan", "Trubbel", "Gröna små äpplen" ("Little Green Apples"), "Monicas vals" ("Waltz for Debby"), "Stick iväg, Jack!" ("Hit the Road Jack"), "Att angöra en brygga", "Var blev ni av", "Måne över Stureplan" (cover of Sting's "Moon Over Bourbon Street") and "Under vinrankan!", among many others.

She also interpreted the works of such Swedish singer-songwriters as Evert Taube, Olle Adolphson and Povel Ramel, as well as international jazz musicians/songwriters. She worked with leading American players including Louis Armstrong, Bill Evans, Stan Getz, Steve Kuhn and Quincy Jones, and in the Scandinavian jazz world with people like Georg Riedel, Egil Johansen, Arne Domnérus, Svend Asmussen and Jan Johansson.

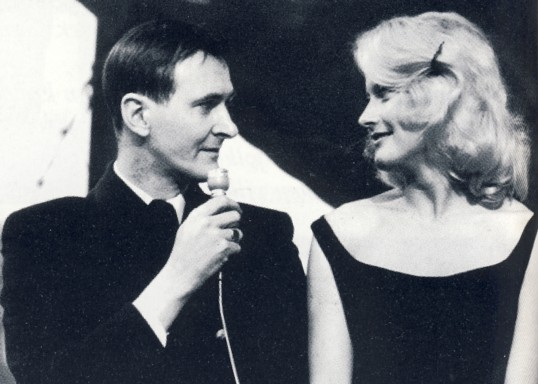
Zetterlund and Hagge Geigert in 1967

In 1964, she recorded the jazz album Waltz for Debby, featuring Bill Evans, a record she herself described as "the best I've done" and was the most proud of. Her professional skill was amply demonstrated in this album in performing the challenging Harold Arlen song, "So Long, Big Time".

Her long career also included the song "En gång i Stockholm" ("Once Upon a Time in Stockholm"); a jazz ballad with which she represented Sweden in the Eurovision Song Contest 1963. She finished last, however and scored nul points, but remained successful in Sweden.

=== Actor ===
Her collaboration with the comic duo Hasse & Tage (in the 1960s and 1970s) eventually led to a stage career in revues and films. Memorable are her parts in the films Att angöra en brygga and Äppelkriget, with her most memorable role being in Jan Troell's Utvandrarna (aka The Emigrants; with Liv Ullmann and Max von Sydow in the leads) as Ulrika, a former prostitute who together with her teenage daughter Elin (portrayed by Zetterlund's daughter, Eva Lena Zetterlund) join the main characters in their emigration to America in the 1850s, a role for which Zetterlund received a Guldbagge Award for Best Supporting Actress. She appeared in more than 20 films and television series.

=== Awards ===
Zetterlund was awarded the Illis quorum by the government of Sweden in 2002.

== Health and death ==
She suffered from severe scoliosis which began after a childhood accident, and as a result was forced to retire from performing in 1999.

On 12 May 2005, she died following an accidental fire in her apartment at Birger Jarlsgatan in Stockholm.

== Discography ==
=== Albums ===
- Swedish Sensation (Columbia, 1958)
- Ahh! Monica! (Philips, 1962)
- Make Mine Swedish Style (Philips, 1964)
- Ohh! Monica! (Philips, 1964)
- Waltz for Debby with Bill Evans (Philips, 1964)
- Monica Zetterlund (Philips, 1967)
- Monica - Monica (Gazell 1971)
- Chicken Feathers (SR, 1972)
- Hej, Man! (Odeon, 1975)
- Folk Som Har Sånger Kan Inte Dö (YTF 1976)
- It Only Happens Every Time with Thad Jones/Mel Lewis Orchestra (Inner City, 1978)
- Holiday for Monica (Phontastic, 1983)
- Monica Zetterlund Sjunger Olle Adolphson (Phontastic, 1984)
- Monica Z (RCA, 1989)
- Varsamt (RCA, 1991)
- Topaz (RCA, 1993)
- The Lost Tapes at Bell Sound Studios NYC (RCA Victor, 1996)
- Det Finns Dagar (RCA, 1997)
- Bill Remembered: A Tribute to Bill Evans (RCA Victor, 2000)
- Diamanter (EMI, 2005)
- Sista Gången Du Var Med (National, 2006)
- På Café Katalin Torsdag 14 September 1989 (Gazell, 2006)
- På Berns 1964 (Vax, 2016)
- Here´s To Life (2024, previously unreleased recordings in English recorded 1989, 1991 and 1993)

=== Notable songs ===
- "Va' e' de' där" ("Dat Dere" with Swedish lyrics by Beppe Wolgers.)
- "En gång i Stockholm"
- "Sakta vi gå genom stan" ("Walkin' My Baby Back Home" with Swedish lyrics by Beppe Wolgers.)

== Filmography ==
- Swedish Portraits (Svenska bilder, 1964) as Mejram
- Docking the Boat (Att angöra en brygga, 1965) as Berit
- Night Games (Nattlek, 1966) as Lotten
- The Emigrants (Utvandrarna, 1971) as Ulrika
- The Apple War (Äppelkriget, 1971) as Anna Lindberg
- The New Land (Nybyggarna, 1972) as Erika
- Stubby, (Fimpen, 1974) as Teacher
- Guttersnipes (Rännstensungar, 1974) as Malinda Karlsson
- Sweden for the Swedes (Sverige åt svenskarna, 1980) as Minister of finance
- The Children from Blue Lake Mountain (Barnen från Blåsjöfjället, 1980) as Hulda Krok
- Russian Pizza Blues (1992) as Herself

Preceded by Inger Berggren with "Sol och vår"	Sweden in the Eurovision Song Contest; 1963	Succeeded by Ingvar Wixell with "Absent Friend"
