= Thore Jederby =

Swedish musician (1913–1984)

Thore Jederby (15 October 1913 – 10 January 1984) was a Swedish jazz double-bassist, record producer, and radio broadcaster.

Jederby was born and died in Stockholm. received formal training in music at the Royal Swedish Academy of Music and began playing jazz in the mid-1930s. He played with Arne Hülphers's band from 1934 to 1938, and then with Thore Ehrling's ensemble from 1938 through the end of World War II. He also led his own group, the Swing Swingers, for studio recordings in the mid-1930s, and led smaller ensembles for recording sessions in the 1940s.

Later in his life, Jederby became active in the capturing of the history of Swedish jazz. He was involved in reissues of early Swedish recordings, curated radio shows devoted to Swedish jazz, and participated in a national commission on the history of jazz in Sweden.
