= Bengt Hallberg =

Swedish jazz pianist, composer and arranger (1932–2013)

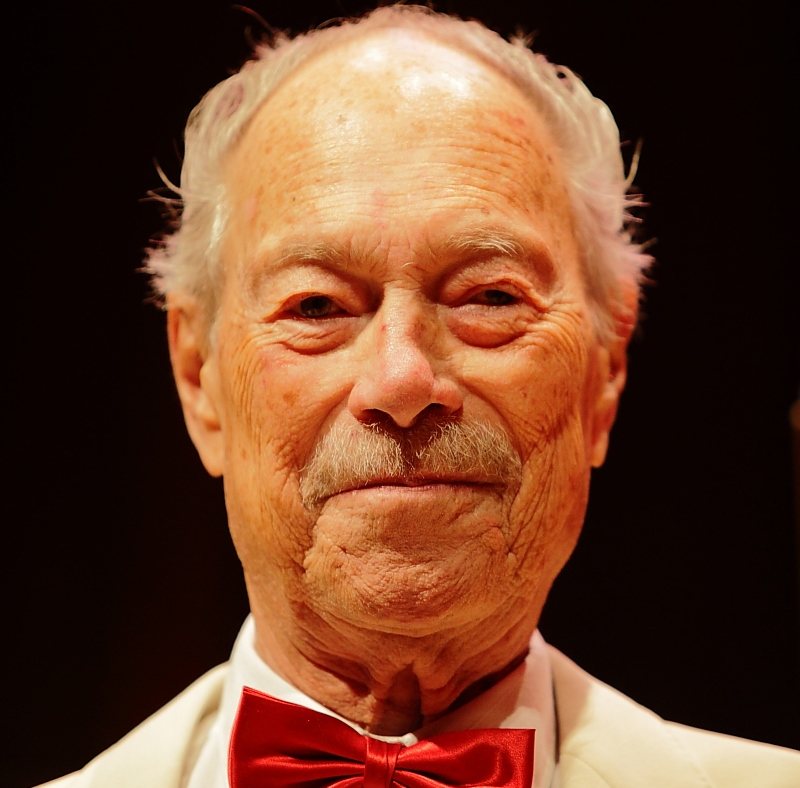
- Bengt hallberg in October 2011

Background information
- Born: 13 September 1932; Gothenburg, Sweden
- Died: 2 July 2013 (aged 80) Uppsala, Sweden
- Genres: jazz
- Occupations: composer, musician
- Instrument: piano

Bengt Hallberg (13 September 1932 – 2 July 2013) was a Swedish jazz pianist, composer and arranger.

Born in Gothenburg, he studied classical piano from an early age, and wrote his first jazz arrangement at the age of 13. At the age of 15 he recorded his first record as a member of a group led by bassist Thore Jederby and in 1949 he recorded with the Swedish alto saxophonist Arne Domnérus for the first time, and the two musicians continued to play together for several decades.

During the 1950s, Hallberg played with leading visiting American players, including the tenor saxophonist Stan Getz, recording "Dear Old Stockholm" (originally "Ack Värmeland du sköna") with him, and alto player Lee Konitz in 1951, and trumpeters Clifford Brown and Quincy Jones in 1953. Jones first recorded arrangement featured Hallberg. In the same period he worked with baritone saxophonist Lars Gullin, another leading Swedish player of the time. Both players were associated with the 'Cool Jazz' scene in their country, influenced by the American school around pianist Lennie Tristano, a Hallberg favourite with whom Konitz was associated.

Hallberg had a versatile style and in his later years he wrote music for film and television, as well as choral arrangements, and he also played the accordion. With Domnerus and Georg Riedel among others, he participated in the Jazz at the Pawnshop sessions in December 1976. According to Chris Mosey, while Hallberg was: "usually an extremely delicate and very measured player, [he] was obviously affected by the general ambience, and here and there cuts loose with awesome force".

Hallberg died from congestive heart failure.

== Discography ==
=== As leader ===
| Year recorded | Title | Label | Personnel/Notes |
|---|---|---|---|
| 1950–51 | New Sounds from Sweden, Vol. 2 | Prestige | Some tracks trio, with Gunnar Almstedt (bass), Anders Burman (drums); some tracks quartet, with Lars Gullin (baritone sax), Gunnar Almstedt (bass), Jack Noren (drums) |
| 1952 | Bengt Hallberg Quartet | Metronome | One track trio with Yngve Akerberg (bass), Jack Noren (drums); some tracks trio with Gunnar Johansson (bass), Kenneth Fagerlund (drums); some tracks quartet, with Arne Domnérus (clarinet) added to each of the trios; reissued by Prestige as New Sounds from Sweden, Vol. 6 |
| 1953 | Bengt Hallberg Swedish All-Stars | Prestige | With Ake Persson, (trombone), Arne Domnérus (alto sax, clarinet), Lars Gullin (baritone sax), Simon Brehm (bass), William Schiopffe (drums) |
| 1953 | Piano Moderns | Prestige | Trio, with Gunnar Johnson (bass), Robert Edman (drums); album shared with Reinhold Svensson |
| 1957? | Dinah | Universal | |
| 1957? | Bengt Hallberg | Epic | |
| 1959? | Two Jazzy People | | |
| 1959 | Kiddin' on the Keys | | Trio, with Gunnar Johnson (bass), Anders Burman (drums) |
| 1962 | At Gyllene Cirkeln | | Trio, with Lars Pettersson (bass), Sture Kallin (drums); in concert |
| 1965? | Bengt Hallberg Piano | Odeon | |
| 1968 | P som i piano | Columbia | Trio, with Lasse Pettersson (bass) and Sture Kallin (drums) |
| 1970? | Bengt Hallberg's a la Carte | CBS | |
| 1973? | Live at Cervantes | Odeon | Duo, co-led with Red Mitchell (bass); in concert |
| 1977 | Hallberg's Happiness | Phontastic | Solo piano |
| 1977 | The Hallberg Treasure Chest: A Bouquet from '78 | Phontastic | Solo piano |
| 1978? | Downtown Meeting: Two Swedes in New York | Phontastic | |
| 1979 | The Hallberg Touch | Phontastic | Solo piano |
| 1980–81 | Hallberg's Hot Accordion | Phontastic | With Arne Domnérus (alto sax, clarinet), Rune Gustafsson (guitar), Georg Riedel (bass); Hallberg plays accordion |
| 1982 | Bengt Hallberg in New York | Phontastic | With Tom Harrell (trumpet, flugelhorn), Jan Allan (trumpet), Jimmy Knepper (trombone), Arne Domnérus (clarinet), Jerry Dodgson and Gerry Niewood (alto sax), Rune Gustafsson (guitar), Georg Riedel (bass), Magnus Persson (drums) |
| 1980–83 | Kraftverk | Phontastic | Most tracks duo, with Arne Domnérus (alto sax); some tracks quartet, with Rune Gustafsson (guitar), Georg Riedel (bass) added |
| 1984 | Hallberg's Yellow Blues | Phontastic | Solo piano |
| 1987 | Spring on the Air | Phono Suecia | With big band |
| 1987 | Hallberg's Surprise | Phontastic | Solo piano |
| 1991 | Skansen in Our Hearts | Aquila | With Gustaf Sjokvist (piano), Gavleborg Symphony Orchestra |
| 1992 | The Tapdancing Butterfly | Aquila | Trio, with Ronnie Gardiner (bass), Sture Akerberg (drums) |
| 1994 | 5 x 100 | Improkomp | With Ad Libitum Choir |
| 1994–95 | Time on My Hands | Improkomp | Solo piano |
| 1996 | In a Mellow Tone | Improkomp | Duo, with Hans Backenroth (bass) |
| 1999 | Stardust in My Heart | Improkomp | Solo piano |
| 2011? | Back 2 Back | Volenza | Duo, co-led with Jan Lundgren (piano) |
| 2011? | Cabin in the Sky | Gazell | Co-led with Karin Krog (vocals) |
| 2012? | Solo | Gazell | Solo piano; in concert |

=== As sideman ===
With Stan Getz

- Stan Getz in Stockholm (Verve, 1955)
- Imported from Europe (Verve, 1958)

With Quincy Jones

- Jazz Abroad (EmArcy, 1955)
- Quincy's Home Again (Metronome, 1958) also released as Harry Arnold + Big Band + Quincy Jones = Jazz! (EmArcy)

== See also ==
- List of jazz pianists
