= Lars Gullin =

Swedish jazz saxophonist (1928–1976)

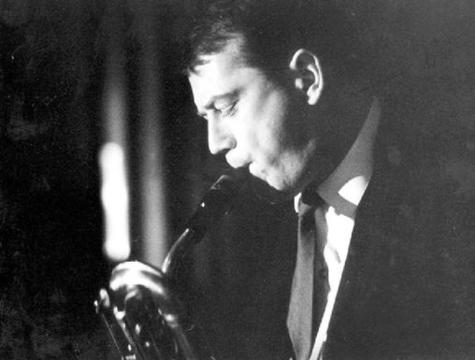
- Lars Gullin in 1964

Background information
- Born: Lars Gunnar Victor Gullin; 4 May 1928; Visby, Sweden
- Died: 17 May 1976 (aged 48) Vissefjärda, Sweden
- Genres: Jazz
- Occupation: Musician
- Instruments: Baritone saxophone, clarinet, piano
- Years active: 1949–1976

Lars Gunnar Victor Gullin (4 May 1928 – 17 May 1976) was a Swedish jazz saxophonist.

== Career ==
Lars Gullin was born in Visby, Sweden. He was a child prodigy on the accordion. At age thirteen, he played clarinet in a military band and later learned the alto saxophone, but, after moving to Stockholm in 1947, became a professional musician as a pianist. He planned on a classical career, studying privately with classical pianist Sven Brandel. Although he actually filled the baritone chair in Seymour Österwall’s band in 1949 by chance, it was enough for him to decide that it was an instrument with possibilities, influenced too by hearing the American baritone saxophonist Gerry Mulligan for the first time on the Birth of the Cool recordings. He worked as a member of Arne Domnérus’s septet (initially co-led by the trumpeter Rolf Ericson) for two years from 1951; the group mainly performed at Nalen, a leading dance spot in Stockholm.

At the same time, Gullin began to work with visiting American musicians, recording with James Moody, Zoot Sims and Clifford Brown. Most importantly, he first performed with Lee Konitz in 1951, an association which was to be repeated several times in future years.

Gullin formed his own group in 1953, probably the only regular group he was to lead. It was short-lived, breaking up that November, after Gullin was responsible for causing the group to be involved in an automobile accident, although no one was seriously hurt. The next year, 1954, he won the best newcomer award in the American DownBeat magazine, after two March 1953 Swedish sessions were leased and issued by Contemporary Records as a 10” LP. Later Gullin albums were leased to Atlantic Records in the United States. Gullin toured several European countries with Chet Baker in October 1955, in a group which was marred by tragedy; it was Gullin who found the body of the group's pianist Dick Twardzik, victim of a heroin overdose, on 21 October, in a Paris hotel room.

The remainder of Gullin’s career was blighted by his own narcotics problems, and sometimes he survived on artists' grants from the Swedish government. He was restricted by illness for much of the later part of 1958. During most of 1959, Gullin, was active in Italy, he played with Chet Baker again and with the jazz alto saxophonist (and businessman) Flavio Ambrosetti, making radio broadcasts with him in Lausanne, Switzerland.

In the 1960s, he continued to work occasionally with leading American players, including Archie Shepp, with whom he recorded in 1963. One of his last major statements was his Aeros aromatic atomica suite recorded in 1973.

Gullin died of a heart attack, brought on by his long-term addiction to methadone. A recording jointly led by Lee Konitz and pianist Lars Sjösten, Dedicated to Lee … Play the Music of Lars Gullin was recorded in 1983, and issued by Dragon Records, who have issued 11 CDs of Gullin's recordings. The film Sven Klang's Combo (Sven Klangs kvintett, 1976) is a fictionalised version of the Swedish jazz scene of the 1950s, and the saxophonist Lars is based on Gullin.

His son, Peter Gullin, (12 April 1959, Milan, Italy – 7 October 2003, Uppsala, Sweden) was also a baritone saxophonist and composer. The elder Gullin’s composition "Peter of April" was dedicated to him. The tune "Danny's Dream" was dedicated to his first son Danny Gullin and "Gabriella" to his daughter, Gabriella Gullin (born 1961), a composer and conductor.

== Discography ==
=== As leader or co-leader ===
- Fine Together (Sonet, 1951; 1956; 1958 [1973])
- The Great Lars Gullin Vol. 2 1953: Rare and Unissued Recordings (Dragon, 1953 [1984])
- Piano Holiday (Metronome, 1953)
- Modern Sounds: Sweden (Contemporary, 1953)
- The Great Lars Gullin Vol. 5 1954/55: Danny's Dream and Manchester Fog (Dragon, 1954–1955 [1990])
- Gullin's Garden (EmArcy, 1954)
- Lars Gullin (EmArcy, 1955)
- Lars Gullin with the Moretone Singers (EmArcy, 1955)
- The Great Lars Gullin Vol. 1 '55/'56 (Dragon, 1955–1956 [1982]) – with Chet Baker and Dick Twardzik
- Baritone Sax (Atlantic, 1956)
- Lars Gullin - Åke Persson (Philips, 1957) – co-led with Åke Persson
- The Artistry of Lars Gullin (Sonet, 1958)
- Lars Gullin Swings (East-West, 1958)
- The Great Lars Gullin Vol. 4 1959/60 (Dragon, 1959–1960 [1989]) – with Rolf Billberg and Harry Bäcklund
- The Liquid Moves of Lars Gullin: Lost Jazz Files 1959–1963 (Sonorama, 1959–1963 [2016])
- The House I Live In (SteepleChase, 1963 [1980]) – co-led with Archie Shepp
- Lars Gullin with Strings (Featuring the Alto Saxophone of Rolf Billberg) (Sonet, 1964 [1980]) – with Rolf Billberg
- Portrait of My Pals (Columbia, 1964)
- Lars Gullin på Gyllene Cirkeln (EMI, 1964–1965 [1979])
- Live! (Columbia, 1969)
- Jazz Amour Affair (Odeon, 1970–1971 [1971])
- Like Grass (Odeon, 1973)
- Bluesport (Odeon, 1974)
- In Concert (Storyville, 1975 [1984]) – with Bernt Rosengren
- Aeros Aromatica Atomica Suite (EMI, 1976)

=== As sideman ===
- Arne Domnérus And His Orchestra 1950/1951 With Rolf Ericson Featuring Lars Gullin (Dragon, 2003)
- Rolf Ericson & The American Stars 1956 with Ernestine Anderson (Dragon, 1995)
- Stan Getz Imported from Europe (Verve, 1958)
- Bengt Hallberg All Star Sessions 1953/54 (Dragon, 2007)
- Quincy Jones Jazz Abroad (EmArcy, 1955)
- The Swedish Modern Jazz Group Sax Appeal (Barben, 1960) – reissued underNils Lindberg 's name (Telestar, 1973)
- Nils Lindberg Sax Appeal & Trisection (Dragon, 1992)
- Brew Moore Brew Moore in Europe (Fantasy, 1964) – with Sahib Shihab
