= Arne Domnérus =

Swedish jazz saxophonist and clarinetist

Arne Domnerus
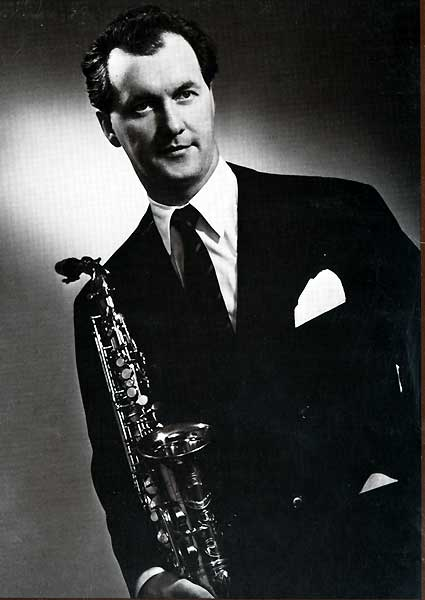
- Arne Domnérus in the early 1950s

Background information
- Birth name: Sven Arne Domnérus
- Born: 20 December 1924; Stockholm, Sweden
- Died: 2 September 2008 (aged 83); Stockholm
- Genres: Jazz
- Occupation: Musician
- Instrument: Saxophone
- Years active: 1940–2000
- Formerly of: Swedish Radio Big Band

Sven Arne Domnérus (20 December 1924 – 2 September 2008) was a Swedish jazz saxophonist and clarinetist.

== Career ==
He began to play the clarinet at the age of 11 but had taken up the saxophone by the time he left school and then turned professional. In 1949 he performed at the Paris Jazz Festival and with Charlie Parker when Parker was on tour in Sweden in 1950. A few years later he recorded with Clifford Brown, Art Farmer, and James Moody. From the middle 1950s to the middle 1960s he was a featured soloist in the Swedish Radio Big Band. He wrote for film and television and recorded with Lars Gullin and Bengt Hallberg.

With Bengt-Arne Wallin, Rolf Ericson, and Åke Persson (the latter two were former members of Duke Ellington's Orchestra), he participated in the Jazz Workshops organised for the Ruhrfest in Recklinghausen by Hans Gertberg from the Hamburg radio station. He recorded several times with Quincy Jones in Sweden and is featured throughout, "The Midnight Sun Never Sets", composed and arranged by Jones and recorded under Jones' direction by Harry Arnold's orchestra in 1958. Domnérus' playing in his early career was typical of the cool, sophisticated, technically accomplished and lyrical style of Swedish modern jazz during the 1950s. Domnérus' health declined in his last years, and he retired from playing.

He was awarded the Illis quorum by the Swedish government in 1994 and the Litteris et Artibus in 2002.

== Discography ==
=== As leader ===
- Come Listen with Me (Telefunken, 1960)
- Arne Domnerus (Metronome, 1961)
- Mobil (Megafon, 1965)
- Fancy (Gazell, 1970)
- Dedikation (Megafon, 1971)
- Hall Dig I Gang (SR, 1971)
- I Let a Song Go Out... (RCA, 1972)
- Songs of Simon (Sonet, 1972)
- Songs of Simon & Garfunkel (Discophon, 1973)
- Sabra (RCA, Victor 1975)
- I'll Be Seeing You (RCA, 1975)
- Antiphone Blues (Proprius, 1975)
- We Love You Madly (Philips, 1975)
- Arne Domnerus Spelar Povel Ramel (Sonet, 1976)
- Jazz at the Pawnshop (Proprius, 1977)
- When Lights Are Low (Telestar, 1977)
- Scandinavian Design (RCA, 1977)
- Hypertoni (RCA, 1977)
- Ja, Vi Alskar (Zarepta, 1978)
- The Sheik (Four Leaf Clover, 1979)
- A.D. 1980 (Phontastic, 1980)
- Musik Under Stjarnorna (RCA, 1980)
- Brost-Toner (Four Leaf Clover, 1980)
- Evergreens Fra Kanaan (Kirkelig Kulturverksted, 1981)
- Duke's Melody (Phontastic, 1981)
- Fragment (Phontastic, 1982)
- Blue and Yellow (Phontastic, 1982)
- Rapturous Reeds with Bob Wilber (Phontastic, 1988)
- Dompan at the Savoy (Phontastic, 1991)
- Good Vibes: Jazz at the Pawnshop 3 (Proprius, 1992)
- Sugar Fingers (Phontastic, 1993)
- Far Jag Lov...Eller Skall Vi Dansa Forst (Ladybird, 1994)
- Heartfelt (Proprius, 1994)
- In Concert with Best Hallberg & Rolf Ericson (Phontastic, 1994)
- Live Is Life (Proprius, 1995)
- Happy Together! with Putte Wickman (LadyBird, 1996)
- Easy Going (LadyBird, 1997)
- Jazz at the Pawnshop 2 (Proprius, 1997)
- Arne Domnerus Septet in Concert (Caprice, 1997)
- A Little Bossa Nova (LadyBird, 1998)
- Face to Face with Bernt Rosengren (Dragon, 1999)
- What Kind of Fool Am I (LadyBird, 2004)
- Jazz Under the Stars (Capitol, 2004)
- Ett Dagsverke (Gazell, 2005)

With Rune Gustafsson

- Dialog (Megafon, 1972)
- Svarta Far (Sonet, 1974)
- Varat Gang (Sonet, 1979)
- Conversation (Polar, 1983)
- Portrait of Porter (Phontastic, 1985)
- Sketches of Standards (Proprius, 1991)

With Bengt Hallberg

- Duets for Duke (Sonet, 1978)
- Downtown Meeting (Phontastic, 1979)
- Skyline Drive (Phontastic, 1983)
- Jazz at the Pawnshop (Prophone, 1990)

=== As sideman ===
With Harry Arnold

- This Is Harry and the Mystery Band (Metronome, 1957)
- Havin' a Ball (Metronome, 1959)
- Guest Book (Metronome, 1961)
- Harry Arnold Jazz Show Live 1959 (Ancha, 1993)
- Premiar! (Ancha, 1994)
- The Big Band in Concert 1957/58 (Dragon, 1996)
- Studio Sessions 56–58 (Dragon, 1998)
- Big Band 1964/65 Vol 1 (Dragon, 2003)
- Big Band 1964/65 Vol 2 (Dragon, 2003)

With Alice Babs

- Alice and Wonderband (Decca, 1959)
- Music with a Jazz Flavour (Swedish Society Discofil, 1973)
- Om Sommaren Skona (Swedish Society Discofil, 1974)
- Alice Babs Serenading Duke Ellington (Swedish Society Discofil, 1975)
- Illusion (Vax, 2007)

With Friedrich Gulda

- Music for Piano and Band (Columbia, 1963)
- Jazz for the Virtuoso (Mace, 1965)
- Jazz at Auditorium (Sonorama, 2016)

With Lars Gullin

- Lars Gullin and His Groups (Prestige, 1953)
- Aeros Aromatic Atomica Suite (EMI, 1976)
- The Great Lars Gullin Vol. 1 '55/'56 (Dragon, 1982)

With Rune Gustafsson

- Young Guitar (Metronome, 1961)
- Killing Me Softly (Sonet, 1973)
- Standards (Eagle, 1995)

With Bengt Hallberg

- Vol. 2 (Metronome, 1954)
- Spelet Om Job (SR, 1972)
- Hallberg's Hot Accordion in the Foreground (Phontastic, 1981)
- In New York (Phontastic, 1984)
- Powerhouse Kraftverk (Phontastic, 1984)
- Spring On the Air (Phono Suecia, 1990)

With Jan Johansson

- Rorelser (Megafon, 1963)
- Jazz Pa Ryska (Megafon, 1967)
- Pa Skiva Med Jan Johansson (Megafon, 1969)
- Du Gladjerika Skona (SR, 1971)
- Younger Than Springtime (Artist, 1972)
- Jan Johansson Spelar Musik Pa Sitt Eget Vis (Megafon, 1973)
- Folkvisor (Megafon, 1988)
- Den Korta Fristen (Megafon, 1991)
- Ack Varmeland Du Skona Rosa (Honung 1995)
- Barnvisor (Heptagon, 1996)

With Radiojazzgruppen/Jan Johansson

- Vardkasar (Sveriges Radio, 1969)
- Frostrosor (SR, 1970)
- Blaslandor (SR, 1970)

With Georg Riedel

- Jazz Ballet (Swedisc, 1964)
- Riedaiglia (Sveriges Radio, 1967)
- Puls Gymnastikmusik (Megafon, 1970)
- Motiomera (SR, 1972)
- En Strimma Av Trost (Proprius, 1982)
- Kirbitz (Phontastic, 1985)

With George Russell

- Othello Ballet Suite/Electronic Organ Sonata No. 2 (Flying Dutchman, 1970)
- Vertical Form VI (Soul Note, 1981)
- New York Big Band (Soul Note, 1982)

With Lars Samuelson

- Dance Party (Four Leaf Clover, 1973)
- Party Music 3 (RCA Victor 1973)
- Het Sommar (EMI, 1975)

With Swedish Radio Jazz Group

- Arktisk Svit/En Dag I Radiohuset Med Broderna Marx (SR, 1971)
- Seismisk Komposition/Monday's Child (SR, 1971)
- Jan Johansson Longing (Phono Suecia, 1993)

With Bengt-Arne Wallin

- Old Folklore in Swedish Modern (DUX, 1962)
- The Magic Box (SR, 1971)
- Varmluft (Sonet, 1972)
- The Birth and Re-Birth of Swedish Folk Jazz (ACT, 1998)

With Monica Zetterlund

- Swedish Sensation (Columbia, 1958)
- Chicken Feathers (SR, 1972)
- Folk Som Har Sanger Kan Inte Do (YTF, 1976)
- Spring Is Here (Dragon, 1988)

With others

- Jan Allan, Jan Allan 70 (Phono Suecia, 1998)
- Ernestine Anderson, Hot Cargo (LPTime, 2007)
- Laila Dalseth, Glad There Is You (Talent 1978)
- The Delta Rhythm Boys, Delta Rhythm Boys in Sweden (Jubilee, 1958)
- Berndt Egerbladh, African Suite (Sonet, 1976)
- Berndt Egerbladh, TwoSome (LadyBird, 1998)
- Thore Ehrling, Minns Med Thore Ehrling (Nostalgia, 1984)
- Thore Ehrling, Pa Nytt (Odeon, 1972)
- Rolf Ericson, Lillette/Be My Love (Artist, 1951)
- Lars Erstrand, A Phontastic Music Party Ad Lib at the Grunewald (Phontastic, 1984)
- Leonard Feather, Leonard Feather & the Swinging Swedes (Cupol, 1974)
- Dizzy Gillespie & Chubby Jackson, Bebop Enters Sweden 1947-49 (Dragon, 1982)
- Bjorn Isfalt, Giliap (Europa Film, 1975)
- Thore Jederby, Bas: Thore Jederby (Odeon, 1970)
- Quincy Jones with Harry Arnold, Quincy's Home Again (Columbia, 1958)
- Thad Jones, Thad and Aura (Four Leaf Clover, 1977)
- Thad Jones, Greetings and Salutations (Passport, 1995)
- Tommy Korberg, Bo Nilsson, Ravaillac (Caprice, 1994)
- Kustbandet, Kustbandet with Arne Domnerus (Exportradet, 1991)
- Nils Lindberg, 7 Dalmalningar Swedish (Society Discofil, 1973)
- James Moody, Moody's Mood for Love (Metronome, 1965)
- Jan W. Morthenson/Csaba Deak/Maurice Karkoff/Jan Bark, 68 (Phono Suecia, 1968)
- Bjarne Nerem, The Big Band Sessions (Gemini, 2008)
- Kjell Ohman, The Hammond Connection (Opus 3, 1994)
- Charlie Parker, Charlie Parker in Sweden (Collector, 1960)
- Povel Ramel, Aterbesok I Holken (Knappupp 1991)
- Red Rodney, Yard's Pad (Sonet, 1976)
- Thore Swanerud, On the Sunny Side (Beaver, 1987)
- Toots Thielemans, Toots Thielemans (Metronome, 1963)
- Carli Tornehave, Who's Harry Warren? Evergreen! (Phontastic, 1995)
- Gosta Theselius, Swedish Jazz (Bally 1956)
- Gosta Torner, Gosta Torner (Telestar, 1972)
- Cornelis Vreeswijk, Spring Mot Ulla Spring! Cornelis Sjunger Bellman (Philips, 1971)
- Osten Warnerbring, Tio Latar...Osten...Och En Soffa (Philips, 1971)
- Harry Warren, Carli Tornehave, Pamela Knowles, Who's Harry Warren? Evergreen!. Vol. 1: Jeepers Creepers (Phontastic, 1981)
- Mike Westbrook, Love and Understanding (My Only Desire, 2020)
- Bob Wilber, Swingin' for the King (Phontastic, 1979)
- Roy Williams, Royal Trombone (Phontastic, 1984)
- Roy Williams, Again! Roy Williams in Sweden (Phontastic, 1987)
