= Georg Riedel (jazz musician) =

Czech-born Swedish double bassist, composer (1934–2024)

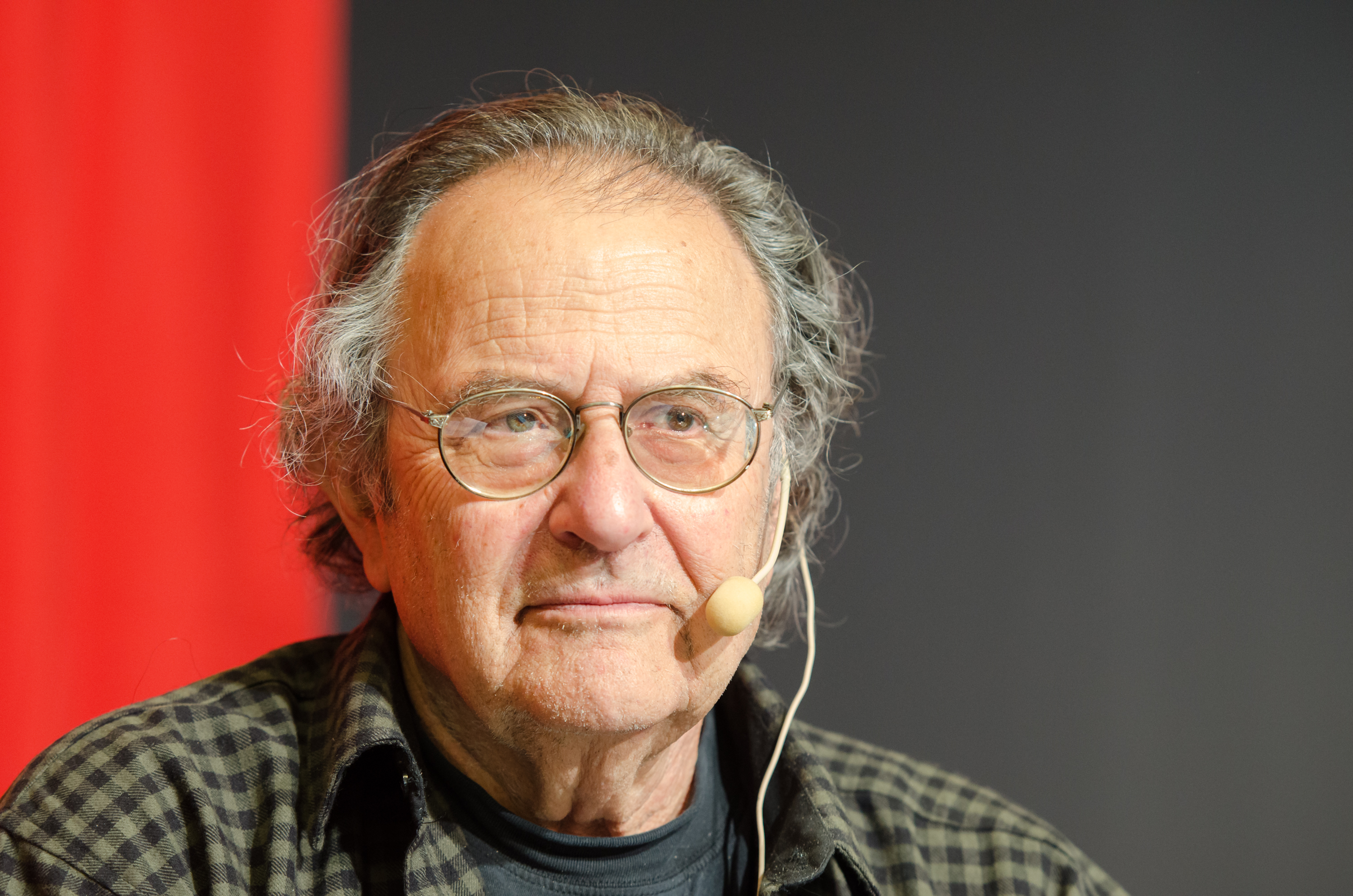
- Riedel in 2013

Background information
- Born: Georg Martin Ludvig Riedel; 8 January 1934; Karlovy Vary, Czechoslovakia
- Died: 25 February 2024 (aged 90) Stockholm, Sweden
- Genres: Jazz, Classical music, children's music
- Occupations: Musician, composer
- Instruments: Double bass, violin
- Years active: 1950s–2020s

Georg Martin Ludvig Riedel (8 January 1934 – 25 February 2024) was a Czech-born Swedish double bassist, composer and arranger. Riedel was especially known for his prominent role in Swedish jazz from the 1950s and for composing music for films, television and children's songs, particularly for Astrid Lindgren adaptations.

== Early life and education ==
Riedel was born in Karlovy Vary, Czechoslovakia, to a Sudeten German father and Jewish Czech mother. In the autumn of 1938, at the age of four, he fled with his family to Sweden to escape the Nazis. His father, Karl Riedel, was an architect and socialist, and his mother, Auguste (née Zentner), was a paediatrician from a Jewish family. The family first lived in central Stockholm, later moving to Mälarhöjden. Riedel began violin and cello lessons as a child and developed a keen interest in music, partly influenced by his father's appreciation for classical composers such as Mozart, Bach, and Tchaikovsky.

Riedel discovered a passion for jazz in adolescence, switching to double bass at the age of 15. He attended Stockholms borgarskola and later studied at the Royal College of Music, Stockholm. He won a school composition contest at age twelve and began performing publicly as a teenager, including an amateur jazz competition in 1950.

== Career ==
=== Jazz ===
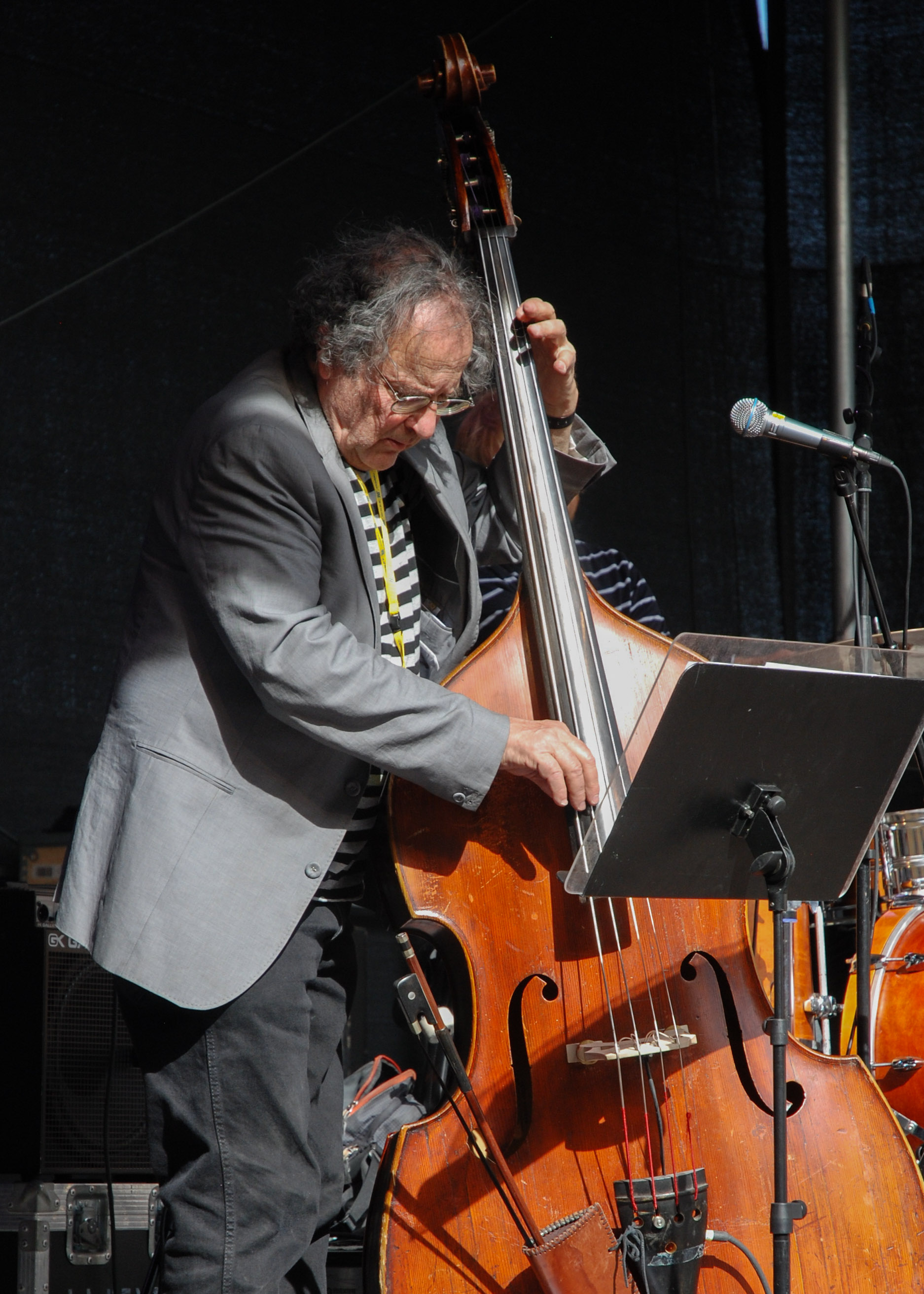
Riedel at Stockholm Jazz Festival, June 2010

After graduating from secondary school, Riedel joined Lars Gullin's quintet for a summer tour in 1953, soon establishing himself as a notable jazz bassist. He became involved in Stockholm's vibrant jazz scene, working with leading musicians such as Jan Johansson, Arne Domnérus, Monica Zetterlund, Jan Allan, and Gunnar Svensson. He became a regular at venues such as Nalen and performed across Sweden, also recording for major Swedish labels from the mid-1950s.

As a member and arranger for Arne Domnérus’ ensembles, Riedel contributed to the group's signature sound, mixing elements of swing, bebop, and later, Swedish folk influences. Alongside Jan Johansson, he developed an approach centred on minimalist arrangements of Swedish folk tunes, most famously on the album Jazz på svenska (1964), which became Sweden's best-selling jazz recording.

Riedel participated in Radiojazzgruppen, served as house musician for Swedish radio and TV productions, and was bass player and arranger for numerous jazz, classical, and crossover projects in the 1960s–1970s. He co-founded the jazz group Trio con Tromba in 1982.

=== Film and children’s music ===
Riedel became widely known for his compositions for children's film and television, particularly his long collaboration with director Olle Hellbom and author Astrid Lindgren. His music featured in Pippi Longstocking, Emil i Lönneberga, Världens bästa Karlsson, and Alla vi barn i Bullerbyn. Having started by arranging and composing instrumental backgrounds for the first Pippi films, Riedel went on to write such classics as "Här kommer Pippi Långstrump", "Sjörövar-Fabbe", "Du käre lille Snickerbo", "Idas sommarvisa" and "Mors lilla lathund".

He was also commissioned for other children's and educational programming, including TV's Alfons Åberg, Granodlarna Wikmansson, and works for TV and school choirs. His music for children is noted for melodic inventiveness and for incorporating jazz idioms and harmonies in a style accessible to all ages.

=== Other compositions ===
Riedel composed regularly for choir, notably with texts by Barbro Lindgren, Christina Lövestam, and Tomas Tranströmer. He arranged or composed for church settings and for the stage, including works for the Folkoperan in Stockholm. He often fused jazz harmonies, Swedish folk music, and contemporary classical techniques, including twelve-tone elements, clusters, and free improvisation.

His later works include projects in Yiddish – most notably the concert and recording Georg Riedels jiddischland (2023) – and choral commentaries on ecological and spiritual themes.

=== Musical style ===
A self-taught composer, Riedel cited classical and Czech/Slovak folk sources, and American jazz musicians such as Duke Ellington, Miles Davis, Louis Armstrong, and Charlie Parker as influences. Jazz historian Jan Bruér has described Riedel's children's songs as "melodic and easily sung, yet harmonically unconventional and striking for their blend of jazz and folk traditions".

=== Selected works ===
- 491 (1964)
- Nightmare (1965)
- Woman of Darkness (1966)
- Pippi Longstocking (1969, music with Jan Johansson)
- Emil i Lönneberga (1971)
- Nya hyss av Emil i Lönneberga (1972)
- Emil och griseknoen (1973)
- Världens bästa Karlsson (1974)
- The Children of Noisy Village (1986)
- Ved Vejen (1988)
- Trust Me (2010)
- Georg Riedels jiddischland (2023)

== Personal life ==
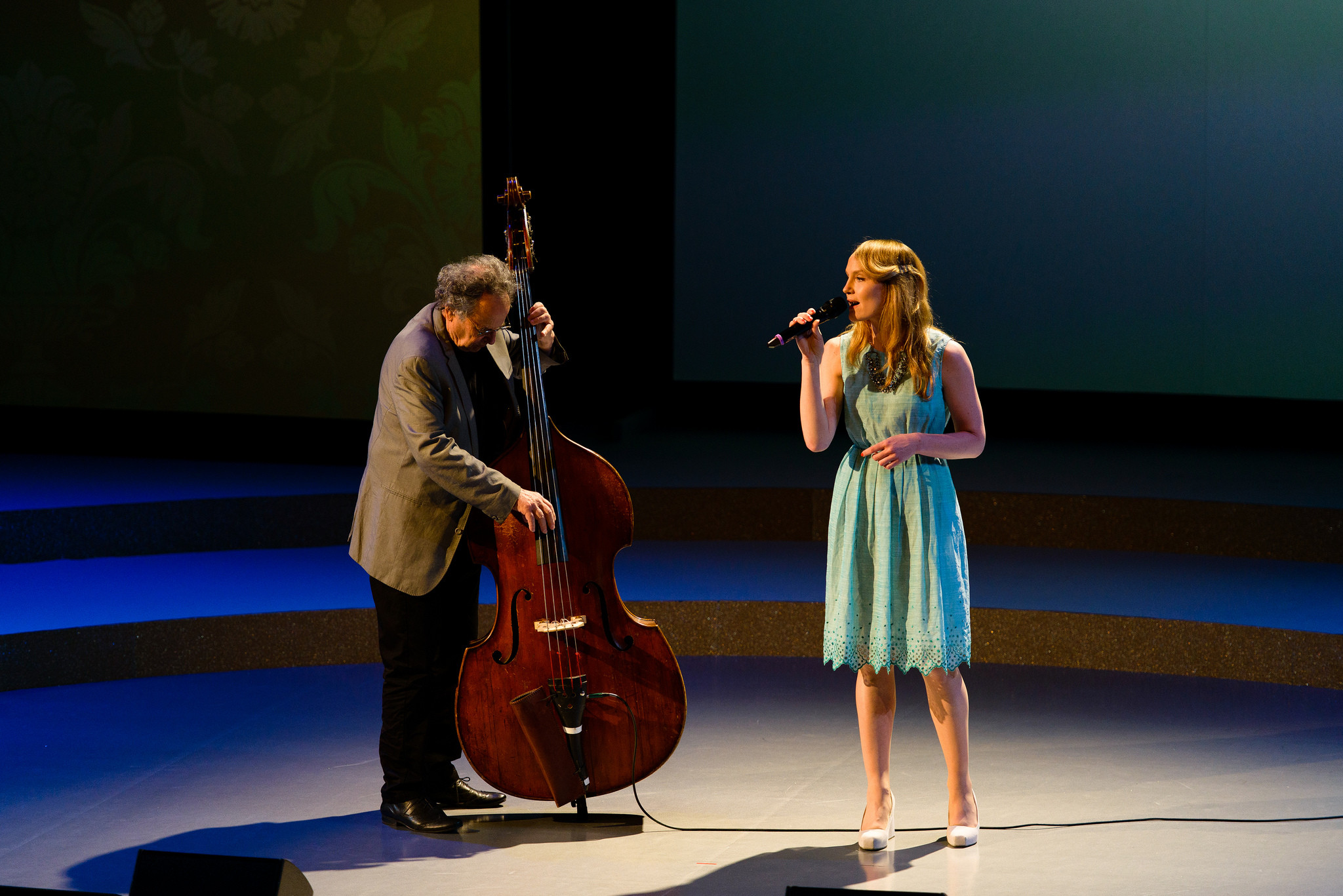
Georg and Sarah Riedel performing at Stockholm Concert Hall

Georg Riedel was married to Gudrun Riedel, who was politically active in the Church of Sweden. The couple had six children. Among his children are the musician and author Channa Riedel (born 1990), who published her debut poetry collection Karlsbad in 2023; and singer-songwriter Sarah Riedel, who contributed vocals to several of her father's children's music recordings as a child before developing her own career as a jazz singer and composer. The family lived for many years in the Stockholm area.

Riedel remained active in Swedish cultural and musical life until late in his life, collaborating artistically with his children and participating in intergenerational musical projects. He died in Stockholm on 25 February 2024, aged 90.

== Discography (selection) ==
- Jazz på svenska (with Jan Johansson, 1964)
- Riedaiglia (1971)
- Lilla ungen min (with Barbro Lindgren, 1991)
- Dance music/Live at Fasching (2021)
- Jiddischland (2023)
