= Jan Johansson (jazz musician) =

Swedish jazz pianist (1931–1968)

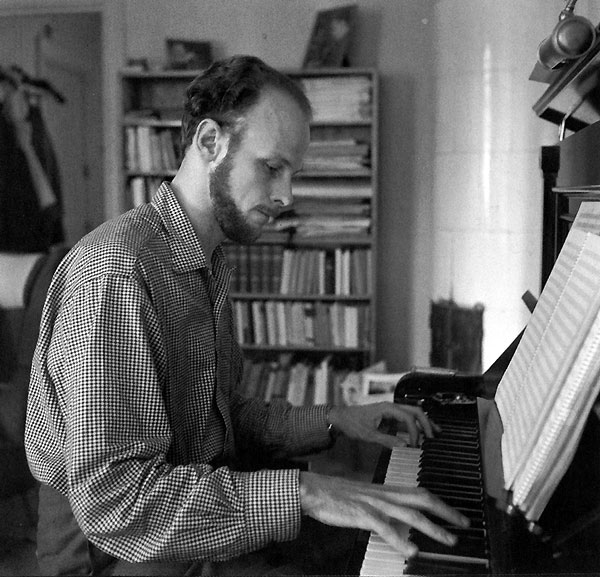
- Johansson in 1965

Background information
- Born: 16 September 1931; Söderhamn, Hälsingland, Sweden
- Died: 9 November 1968 (aged 37) Sollentuna, Sweden
- Genres: Jazz
- Occupation: Musician
- Instrument: Piano
- Years active: 1948–68
- Labels: Rosa Honung, Dot
- Formerly of: The Johansson Brothers
- Website: www.janjohansson.org

Jan Johansson (16 September 1931 – 9 November 1968) was a Swedish jazz pianist, composer and arranger whose work combined modern jazz, Scandinavian folk music and large-ensemble writing.

Active both as a performer, composer and arranger for recording, radio and television during the 1950s and 1960s, he was a member of Arne Domnérus’s orchestra and of Radiojazzgruppen, and collaborated with musicians including Stan Getz and Georg Riedel.

Johansson is widely associated with a series of recordings based on European folk music interpreted through jazz, among them Jazz på svenska (1964), which became the best-selling jazz album in Swedish history, with more than 400,000 copies sold, and has remained continuously in print since its release. He also composed music for film and television, including the theme for the television series Pippi Longstocking.

Johansson was the father of Anders Johansson, drummer in HammerFall, and Jens Johansson, keyboardist in Stratovarius. The brothers operate the record label Heptagon Records, which manages the continued availability of Johansson’s recordings.

== Early life and education ==
Jan Johansson was born on 16 September 1931 in Söderhamn, Hälsingland, and grew up in Söderala parish, Gävleborg County. His parents were Valter August Johansson, a district manager, and Ingeborg Persson, a primary school teacher. He began piano studies at the age of eleven and continued formal musical training throughout his school years. During his teenage years he performed jazz with local amateur groups.

After completing his secondary education at Söderhamns läroverk in 1951, Johansson enrolled in electrical engineering at Chalmers University of Technology in Gothenburg. While studying there, he served as pianist and musical director for several student revues (spex), including productions based on historical themes such as Gustav Vasa. He also performed regularly with local jazz ensembles and participated in jam sessions with visiting musicians.

== Career ==
=== Early professional work (1955–1959) ===
After leaving his engineering studies, Johansson worked professionally as a jazz pianist in Gothenburg during the mid-1950s. He performed with the orchestras of Gunnar Hammarlund and Kenneth Fagerlund, and from 1956 to 1959 with bassist Gunnar Johnson’s quintet. With this ensemble he toured extensively in Sweden and made radio and gramophone recordings. Johansson married Else Gunborg Charlotta Bergström in 1957.

=== Collaboration with Stan Getz (1959–1960) ===
In 1959 Johansson was invited by tenor saxophonist Stan Getz to perform at Jazz Club Montmartre in Copenhagen. He remained in Denmark during the 1959–1960 season and participated with Getz in recordings and Nordic concert tours. In 1960 he became the first non-American musician to take part in the international Jazz at the Philharmonic tour.

=== Stockholm period and Radiojazzgruppen (1961–1968) ===
In 1961 Johansson joined the orchestra of Arne Domnérus, beginning a collaboration that lasted until his death. He relocated with his family to Upplands Väsby in 1962. During the same period he became a member of Swedish jazz band Radiojazzgruppen (lit. 'Radio Jazz Group'), for which he composed and arranged a substantial part of the ensemble's repertoire, often in collaboration with Georg Riedel.

During the 1960s Johansson recorded extensively in his own name. His 1964 album Jazz på svenska, recorded with Georg Riedel, consisted of jazz interpretations of Swedish folk melodies and became the best-selling jazz album in Swedish history. The approach was later continued with Jazz på ryska (1967) and Jazz på ungerska (1968). Other recordings from this period include 8 bitar Johansson, Innertrio, 300 000 and the multi-album project Musik genom fyra sekler.

In addition to his work as a performer and recording artist, Johansson composed and arranged music for radio, television and film. He wrote the theme music for the television series Pippi Långstrump, with lyrics by Astrid Lindgren, and composed music for several Swedish feature films including Barnvagnen and Skrållan, Ruskprick och Knorrhane. He also composed for ballet and stage productions in collaboration with choreographer Lia Schubert and author Rune Lindström.

== Death ==
On 9 November 1968 Johansson died in a car accident near Sollentuna, while traveling from his home to Stockholm Central Station to meet colleagues traveling to a concert engagement in Jönköping. He was 37 years old. Johansson was buried on 4 December 1968 at Skogskyrkogården in Stockholm. A memorial concert was held in Stockholm in December 1968, and the proceeds were used to establish a scholarship fund in his name. Several Grammis awards were later awarded posthumously for albums released after his death. His widow, Else, died on 1 August 2022.

== Discography ==
=== As leader ===
Year recorded	Title	Label	Notes
1959–60	Younger Than Springtime	Artist	With Arne Domnérus (alto sax), Dan Jordan, Georg Riedel and Sture Nordin (bass; separately), Egil Johansen and William Schiöpffe (drums; separately)
1961	8 bitar Johansson	Megafon	Trio, with Gunnar Johnson (bass), Ingvar Callmer (drums)
1962?	Innertrio	Megafon	Trio, with Georg Riedel (bass), Egil Johansen (drums)
1963?	Rörelser	Megafon	with Georg Riedel
1962–64	Jazz på svenska	Megafon	Duo, with Georg Riedel (bass)
1964	In pleno	Megafon	With Rune Gustafsson (guitar), Georg Riedel (bass), Egil Johansen (drums), Rupert Clemendore (percussion)
1964?	Sweden Nonstop	DOT	
1964?	Svenska folklåtar	Ais/Megarock	
1966?	Dansa med TV	AB Megafon	
1966	Live in Tallinn	Heptagon	Trio, with Rune Gustafsson (guitar), Georg Riedel (bass); in concert
1964–66	Spelar musik på sitt eget vis	Megafon	With Andreas Skjold (trombone), Arne Domnérus (alto sax, clarinet), Claes Rosendahl (clarinet), Bjarne Nerem (tenor sax), Rune Gustafsson (guitar), Georg Riedel, Sture Nordin and Sture Akerberg (bass), Egil Johansen and Rupert Clemendore (drums)
1966?	Barnkammarmusik	Megafon	with Bengt-Arne Wallin
1967?	Jazz på ryska	Megafon	With Georg Riedel (bass), Egil Johansen (drums), Arne Domnérus (clarinet), Bosse Broberg (trumpet), Lennart Åberg (tenor sax)
1964–68	In Hamburg	ACT	Some tracks duo, with Georg Riedel; some tracks with big band
1967–68	300.000	Megafon	With Lennart Åberg (tenor sax), Georg Riedel (bass), Egil Johansen and Rupert Clemendore (drums), Gote Nilsson (electronics); in concert
1967–68	Den korta fristen	Heptagon	With big band
1968	Musik genom fyra sekler	Megafon	With Claes Rosendahl (clarinet, flute), Sven Berger (flute, oboe, bassoon), Rune Gustafsson (guitar), Georg Riedel, Arne Wilhelmsson and Sture Akerberg (bass)
1995	På skiva med Jan Johansson	Megafon	
1995	Intervju med ett piano	Rosa Honung	
1997	Blues	Heptagon	
2007	Piano	Heptagon	

=== Collaborations ===
With Svend Asmussen

- 1968: Spelar jazz på ungerska (Megafon Records)

With Radiojazzgruppen

- 1969: Vårdkasar (Sveriges Radio)
- 1970: Frostrosor (Sveriges Radio), with Georg Riedel
- 1991: Den korta fristen (Megafon Records)

With Alice Babs

- 2007: Illusion (Vax Records ), with Georg Riedels Orkester

With Stan Getz

- Imported from Europe (Verve, 1958)
- Stan Getz at Large (Verve, 1960)
- 2011: Stan Getz At Nalen (Live In The Swedish Harlem) (Riverside Records)

With Oscar Pettiford

- My Little Cello (Debut, 1960)
