= The Washington Concerts =

Live album by Charlie Parker
- Released: 1983
- Recorded: October 18, 1952; February 22, 1953; March 8, 1953
- Venue: Howard Theatre; Club Kavakos
- Genre: Jazz
- Length: 68:24 (re-release)
- Label: Elektra; Blue Note

Charlie Parker chronology
Inglewood Jam (1978)	The Washington Concerts (1983)	The Complete Charlie Parker on Verve (1990)

The Washington Concerts is an album by jazz saxophonist Charlie Parker, first released in 1983 by Elektra and re-released in its full form by Blue Note in 2001. The album's content is drawn from two live performances at the Howard Theatre and one at Club Kavakos.

== Critical reception ==
Professional ratings
Review scores
Source	Rating
AllMusic	4/5 stars
The Penguin Guide to Jazz	3/4 stars

AllMusic noted, "Bird relied entirely on instinctual 'bop logic' to navigate with ease as he formulated solos of remarkable prismatic complexity." Michael Fortuna, writing for All About Jazz, commented that Parker "gave a jaw-dropping performance with Joe Timer's orchestra at the Club Kavakos in Washington, D.C. in 1953."

The Penguin Guide to Jazz praised the album, noting that Parker "doesn't miss a cue all evening and indeed plays as if inspired in places, using the band voicings to trigger off some of his most inventive solos." Doug Ramsey of JazzTimes estimated that the rendition of "Anthropology" was performed at roughly 310 beats per minute, and stated: "At that velocity, rather than fall back on the clichés and stock phrases that would permit most players to survive the tempo, Bird cranks up his imagination for some of the most original improvisation of the early 1950s."

== Track listing ==
1. "Fine and Dandy" (Paul James, Kay Swift) – 3:26
2. "These Foolish Things" (Harry Link, Holt Marvell, Jack Strachey) – 3:22
3. "Light Green" (Bill Potts) – 3:35
4. "Thou Swell" (Richard Rodgers, Lorenz Hart) – 3:51
5. "Willis" (Potts) – 5:22
6. "Don't Blame Me" (Dorothy Fields, Jimmy McHugh) – 2:21
7. "Something to Remember You By" (Howard Dietz, Arthur Schwartz) / "Blue Room" (Rodgers, Hart) – 3:13
8. "Roundhouse" (Gerry Mulligan) – 3:12
9. "Ornithology" (Benny Harris, Parker) – 4:21
10. "Out of Nowhere" (Johnny Green, Edward Heyman) – 4:37
11. "Cool Blues" – 4:13
12. "Anthropology" (Dizzy Gillespie, Parker) – 4:58
13. "Scrapple from the Apple" – 5:19
14. "Out of Nowhere" (Green, Heyman) / "Now's the Time" – 12:38
15. Red Rodney interview – 3:56

== Personnel ==
- Charlie Parker – alto saxophone
- Ed Leddy, Marky Markowitz, Charlie Walp, Bob Carey – trumpet
- Earl Swope, Rob Swope, Dan Spiker, Kai Winding – trombone
- Jim Riley – alto saxophone
- Jim Parker, Angelo Tompros, Ben Lary, Zoot Sims – tenor saxophone
- Jack Nimitz – baritone sax
- Charlie Byrd – guitar
- Jack Holliday, Bill Shanahan – piano
- Mert Oliver, Franklin Skeete – bass
- Joe Timer, Max Roach, Don Lamond – drums
