= Tommy Newsom =

American musician (1929-2007)

- Born: Thomas Penn Newsom; February 25, 1929; Portsmouth, Virginia, U.S.
- Died: April 28, 2007 (aged 78) Portsmouth, Virginia, U.S.
- Genres: Jazz
- Occupations: Musician, arranger
- Instruments: Saxophone, clarinet, flute
- Years active: 1960–2005
- Label: Arbors

Thomas Penn Newsom (February 25, 1929 – April 28, 2007) was a saxophone player in the NBC Orchestra on The Tonight Show Starring Johnny Carson, for which he later became assistant director. Newsom was frequently the band's substitute director, whenever music director Doc Severinsen was away from the show or filling in for announcer Ed McMahon. Nicknamed "Mr. Excitement" by Johnny Carson as an ironic take on his low-keyed, reserved persona, he was often a foil for Carson's humor. His conservative brown or blue suits were a marked contrast to Severinsen's flashy stage clothing.

== Biography ==
Newsom was born in Portsmouth, Virginia. He earned degrees from the Norfolk Division of the College of William & Mary (now Old Dominion University), the Peabody Conservatory of Music, and Columbia University. He served in the United States Air Force during the Korean War where he played in the band. Later, he toured with the Benny Goodman Orchestra, and performed with Vincent Lopez in New York. Newsom joined the Tonight Show Band in 1962, and left it when Carson retired in 1992. In addition to Carson's orchestra, Newsom performed with the orchestra for The Merv Griffin Show.

Newsom was as well known within the music industry as an arranger as well as a performer. He arranged for groups as varied as the Tonight Show ensemble and the Cincinnati Pops Orchestra, and musicians Skitch Henderson, Woody Herman, Kenny Rogers, Charlie Byrd, John Denver, and opera star Beverly Sills.

Newsom won two Emmy Awards as a music director: in 1982 with Night of 100 Stars, and in 1986 for the broadcast of the 40th Annual Tony Awards. He also recorded several albums as a bandleader.

On April 28, 2007, Newsom died of bladder and liver cancer at his home in Portsmouth. He was 78 years old. Newsom had been married to his wife Patricia for 49 years. They had a daughter, Candy, and a son, Mark, who died in 2003.

== Quotes ==
Newsom and Carson used audiences' low expectations for Newsom to good advantage:

- One night Carson turned to Newsom during his monologue and asked why he always had his hands clasped together behind his back. Newsom replied, "vapor lock!" bringing down the house with laughter. Carson quipped, "I'm out here busting my buns to get a laugh, with one joke after another, and you just say 'vapor lock' and crack us all up!" (Carson made similar "complaints" on multiple episodes)
- During one episode Newsom appeared in a sport coat similar to Carson's own. Noticing the similarity, Carson asked Newsom where he got his; he responded simply, "It was in my closet at home, John".
- Another time, Carson, who had just returned from vacation, said, "I really missed you guys." Newsom: "Why didn't you write?"
- One night, Newsom wore a very bold (for him) yellow suit. Carson commented, "Look at that big, dumb canary." Newsom's response: "You’ll know what kind of bird I am when I fly over you."
- During a March 1991 episode, Johnny asked Newsom where bandleader Doc Severinsen was. Newsom replied that Severinsen went with his wife to Florida. Then Tommy followed up seconds later saying "He was going to Tampa (tamper) with her." Later in the show, Johnny asked drummer Ed Shaughnessy, who was going to perform in Illinois, if he was going to do a clinic in addition to performing a concert; Shaughnessy replied he was doing just a concert. When Johnny asked Tommy if he ever did clinics, Tommy replied "I go to clinics", which yet again brought down the house. Johnny temporarily walked offstage in mock offense.
- One night Johnny asked Tommy if he wore designer underwear. Tommy: "I make my own designs.”

== Discography ==
- Live from Beautiful Downtown Burbank (Direct Disc Labs, 1978)
- Tommy Newsom & His TV Jazz Stars (1990)
- I Remember You, Johnny (1996)
- The Feeling of Jazz with Ken Peplowski (Arbors, 1999)
- Tommy Newsom is Afraid of Bees (2000)
- Friendly Fire (Arbors, 2001)

=== As sideman ===
With Buck Clayton and Tommy Gwaltney's Kansas City 9

- Goin' to Kansas City (1960, Riverside)

With Rosemary Clooney

- Dedicated to Nelson (1996, Concord)

With J. J. Johnson

- The Total J.J. Johnson (RCA Victor, 1967)

=== As arranger ===
With Maurice Hines

- To Nat "King" Cole With Love (Arbors)
