= Swope =

Swope is a surname. Notable people with the surname include:

- Amanda Swope, American politician from Oklahoma
- Chandler Swope, American politician from West Virginia; West Virginia State Senator 2017–present
- Earl Swope (1922–1968), American jazz trombonist; brother of Rob Swope
- Gerard Swope (1872–1957), American businessman; president of General Electric 1922–44
- Guy J. Swope (1892–1969), American politician from Pennsylvania; U.S. representative 1937–39; governor of Puerto Rico 1941
- Henrietta Hill Swope (1902–1980), American astronomer
- Herbert Bayard Swope (1882–1958), American journalist and editor; said to have coined the term cold war
- John Augustus Swope (1827–1910), American politician from Pennsylvania; U.S representative 1884–87
- King Swope (1893–1961), American politician from Kentucky; U.S. representative 1919–21
- Martin Swope (born 1955), American tape manipulator and sound engineer
- Michael Sheldon Swope (1843-1929), American jeweler; benefactor of the Swope Art Museum
- Richard T. Swope (1942-2011), United States Air Force lieutenant general; Inspector General of the United States Air Force
- Rob Swope (1926–1967), American jazz trombonist; brother of Earl Swope
- Sam Swope, American author of children's stories
- Samuel F. Swope (1809–1865), American lawyer and politician from Kentucky; U.S. representative 1855–57
- Thomas H. Swope (1827–1909), American real estate magnate and philanthropist

== See also ==
- Putney Swope, a 1969 film written and directed by Robert Downey, Sr.
- Swope Supernova Survey, astronomical telescope system
