= Born to Be Blue =

Born to Be Blue may refer to:

- Born to Be Blue (Mel Tormé song), a 1946 song written by Mel Tormé and Robert Wells
- Born to Be Blue (Grant Green album), a 1962 album by jazz guitarist Grant Green
- Born to Be Blue! (Bobby Timmons album), a 1963 album by jazz pianist Bobby Timmons
- Born to Be Blue (Freddie Hubbard album), a 1982 album by jazz trumpeter Freddie Hubbard
- Born to Be Blue (The Judds song), a 1990 song by American country music duo The Judds
- Born to Be Blue (Toni Price album), a 2003 album by country-blues singer Toni Price
- "Born to Be Blue", a 2012 song by The Mavericks from their album In Time
- Born to Be Blue (film), a 2015 Canadian film about musician Chet Baker

== See also ==
- Born 2 B Blue, 1988 Steve Miller album
