= One Night in Washington =

Live album by Dizzy Gillespie
- Released: 1983
- Recorded: March 13, 1955; Washington D. C.
- Genre: Jazz
- Length: 49:03
- Label: Elektra/Musician; E1 60300
- Producer: Bill Potts

Dizzy Gillespie chronology
Jazz Recital (1954–55)	One Night in Washington (1983)	Modern Jazz Sextet (1956)

One Night in Washington is a live album by trumpeter Dizzy Gillespie and The Orchestra recorded in 1955 and released on the Elektra/Musician label in 1983.

== Reception ==
The Allmusic review stated "Gillespie obviously steals the show" and awarded the album 4 stars.

Professional ratings
Review scores
Source	Rating
Allmusic	4/5 stars

== Track listing ==
1. "The Afro Suite: Manteca/Contrasta/Jungla/Rhumba Finale" (Dizzy Gillespie, Chano Pozo, Gil Fuller/Gillespie, Chico O'Farrill/Gillespie, O'Farrill/Gillespie, O'Farrill) – 16:47
2. "Hob Nail Boogie" (Buster Harding, Count Basie) – 7:56
3. "Wild Bill's Boogie" (Harding, Basie) – 6:25
4. "Caravan" (Juan Tizol) – 5:15
5. "Tin Tin Deo" (Gillespie, Pozo) – 6:26
6. "Up 'N' Downs" (Tom McKay) – 6:14

== Personnel ==
- Dizzy Gillespie – trumpet, vocals
- Al Porcino, Bob Carey, Bunny Aldhizer, Chas Frankhauser, Ed Leddy, Marky Markowitz – trumpet
- Earl Swope, Dick Leith, Rob Swope – trombone
- Mike Goldberg – alto saxophone
- Angelo Tompros, Jim Parker, Spencer Sinatra – tenor saxophone
- Joel Davie – baritone saxophone
- Larry Eanet – piano
- Ed Dimond – piano, percussion
- Mert Oliver, Tom McKay – bass
- Joe Timer – drums, musical director
- Bovino, George Caldwell – congas
- Buddy Rowell – timbales
