= Bird: The Complete Charlie Parker on Verve =

Box set by Charlie Parker
- Released: October 25, 1990
- Recorded: 1945–1954
- Genre: Jazz
- Length: 619:10
- Label: Verve
- Producer: Phil Schaap

Charlie Parker chronology
The Washington Concerts (1983)	Bird: The Complete Charlie Parker on Verve (1990)	Charlie Parker on Dial (1993)

Professional ratings
Review scores
Source	Rating
AllMusic	link
Encyclopedia of Popular Music	5/5 stars

Bird: The Complete Charlie Parker on Verve is a 1990 box set by jazz musician Charlie Parker. It features every extant note Parker recorded for labels controlled by Norman Granz (unified under the name Verve in 1956, the year after Parker died) as well as his appearances at Jazz at the Philharmonic. Parker recorded for Granz primarily in the last five years of his life, a period during which, besides playing with his famous quintet, he experimented with strings, Afro-Cuban jazz and mixed chorus. Among the albums produced during Parker’s Verve years were Bird & Diz, Charlie Parker with Strings, and Swedish Schnapps.

== Track listing ==
Original CD release Bird: The Complete Charlie Parker on Verve, 1990 (Verve)

Disc: 1

1. "Sweet Georgia Brown"- 9:32
2. "Blues For Norman" – 8:37
3. "I Can't Get Started" – 9:15
4. "Lady Be Good" 11:05
5. "After You've Gone" – 7:33
6. "I Got Rhythm" – 12:54
7. "Introductions By Norman Granz" – 2:16
8. "JATP Blues" 10:56

Disc: 2

1. "The Bird” - 4:44
2. "Repetition” – 2:57
3. "No Noise” (Parts I & II) – 5:53
4. "No Noise” (Part III) – 2:55
5. "Mango Mangue” – 2:53
6. "Okiedoke” – 3:02
7. "Cardboard” – 3:08
8. "Visa” 3:58
9. “Segment - Tune X” – 3:19
10. “Diverse - Tune X” (alternate take) – 3:16
11. “Passport - Tune Y” (rare) – 2:54
12. “Passport - Tune Z” (common) – 2:59

Disc: 3

1. “The Opener” – 12:47
2. “Lester Leaps In” – 12:14
3. “Embraceable You” – 10:33
4. “The Closer” – 10:57
5. “'Ow - Introduction of Ella Fitzgerald” – :48
6. “Flyin' Home” – 5:31
7. “How High the Moon” – 6:24
8. “Perdido” – 8:34

Disc: 4

1. “Just Friends” – 3:30
2. “Everything Happens to Me” – 3:15
3. “April In Paris” – 3:06
4. “Summertime” – 2:46
5. “I Didn't Know What Time It Was” – 3:12
6. “If I Should Lose You” – 2:46
7. “Star Eyes” – 3:28
8. “Blues (Fast)” – 2:45
9. “I'm In The Mood For Love” – 2:50
10. “Bloomdido” – 3:24
11. “And Oscar For Treadwell” (Take 3 Alternate take - LP) – 3:20
12. “An Oscar For Treadwell” (Take 4 Master) – 3:22
13. “Mohawk” (Take 3 Alternate take - LP) – 3:38
14. “Mohawk” (Take 6 (Take 4) Master) – 3:34
15. “My Melancholy Baby” (Take 1) – 3:16
16. “My Melancholy Baby” (Coda Rehearsal) - :05
17. “My Melancholy Baby” (Take 2 Master) – 3:23
18. “Leap Frog” (Take 1 Incomplete) - :27
19. “Leap Frog” (Take 2 Incomplete) - :18
20. “Leap Frog” (Take 3 Incomplete) - :40
21. “Leap Frog” (Take 4 Incomplete) - :18
22. “Leap Frog” (Take 5 Alternate take) – 2:33
23. “Leap Frog” (Take 6 Incomplete) - :24
24. “Leap Frog” (Take 7 Incomplete) - :14
25. “Leap Frog” (Take 8 (Take 4) Alternate take) – 2:02
26. “Leap Frog” (Take 9 Alternate take) – 2:06
27. “Leap Frog” (Take 10 Incomplete) - :43
28. “Leap Frog” (Take 11 (Take 6) Master) – 2:29
29. “Relaxing With Lee” (Take 1 Incomplete) - :35
30. “Relaxing With Lee” (Take 2 Incomplete) – 1:08
31. “Relaxing With Lee” (Take 3 False start) - :08
32. “Relaxing With Lee” (Take 4 (Take 2) Alternate take - LP) – 3:56
33. “Relaxing With Lee” (Take 5 Incomplete) - :25
34. “Relaxing With Lee” (Take 6 (Take 3) Master) – 2:46

Disc: 5

1. “Dancing In The Dark” – 2:19
2. “Out Of Nowhere” – 3:06
3. “Laura” (Take 1 Alternate take) – 2:57
4. “Laura” (Take 2 Master) – 2:56
5. “East Of The Sun” – 3:38
6. “They Can't Take That Away From Me” – 3:17
7. “Easy To Love” – 3:29
8. “I'm In The Mood For Love” (Take 2 Master) – 3:33
9. “I'm In The Mood For Love” (Take 3 Alternate take) – 3:27
10. “I'll Remember April” (Take 1 Alternate take) – 3:09
11. “I'll Remember April” (Take 2 False start) – :10
12. “I'll Remember April” (Take 3 (Take 2) Master) – 3:02
13. “What Is This Thing Called Love?” – 2:54
14. “April In Paris” – 3:12
15. “Repetition” – 2:49
16. “Easy To Love” – 2:25
17. “Rocker” – 3:10
18. “Celebrity” – 1:34
19. “Ballade” – 2:55
20. “Afro-Cuban Jazz Suite” – 17:11

Disc: 6

1. “Au Privave” (Take 2 Alternate take - LP) – 2:38
2. “Au Privave” (Take 3 Master) – 2:43
3. “She Rote” (Take 3 Alternate take - LP) – 3:09
4. “She Rote” (Take 5 Master) –3:06
5. “K.C. Blues” – 3:24
6. “Star Eyes” – 3:34
7. “My Little Suede Shoes” – 3:03
8. “Un Poquito De Tu Amor” – 2:40
9. “Tico Tico” –2:44
10. “Fiesta” – 2:49
11. “Why Do I Love You” (Take 2 Alternate take - LP) – 2:58
12. “Why Do I Love You” (Take 6 Alternate take) – 2:58
13. “Why Do I Love You” (Take 7 Master) – 3:05
14. “Blues for Alice” –2:46
15. “Si Si” – 2:38
16. “Swedish Schnapps” (Take 3 Alternate take - LP) – 3:13
17. “Swedish Schnapps” (Take 4 Master) – 3:10
18. “Back Home Blues” (Take 1 Alternate take - LP) – 2:35
19. “Back Home Blues” (Take 2 Master) – 2:46
20. “Loverman” – 3:21

Disc: 7

1. “Temptation” – 3:31
2. “Lover” – 3:06
3. “Autumn In New York” – 3:29
4. “Stella by Starlight” – 2:56
5. “Mama Inez“– 2:50
6. “La Cucuracha” (Take 1 Alternate take) – 3:24
7. “La Cucuracha” (Take 2 Incomplete) – :49
8. “La Cucuracha” (Take 3 False start) – :10
9. “La Cucuracha” (Take 4 (Take 3) Master) – 2:43
10. “Estrellita” (Take 2 Incomplete) – 1:57
11. “Estrellita” (Take 4 Alternate take) – 2:46
12. “Estrellita” (Take 5 False start) – :04
13. “Estrellita” (Take 6 (Take 5) Master) – 2:44
14. “Begin The Beguine“– 3:12
15. “La Paloma“– 2:39
16. “Night And Day” – 2:50
17. “Almost Like Being In Love” – 2:33
18. "I Can't Get Started" – 3:08

Disc: 8

1. “Jam Blues” – 14:42
2. “What Is This Thing Called Love” – 15:41
3. “Ballad Medley” – 17:23
4. “Funky Blues” – 13:27

Disc: 9

1. “The Song Is You” – 2:56
2. “Laird Baird” – 2:44
3. “Kim” (Take 2 Alternate take - LP) – 2:58
4. “Kim” (Take 4 Master) – 2:58
5. “Cosmic Rays” (Take 2 Master) – 3:05
6. “Cosmic Rays” (Take 5 Alternate take) – 3:16
7. “In The Still Of The Night” (Take 1 False start) – :32
8. “In The Still Of The Night” (Take 2 Incomplete) – :53
9. “In The Still Of The Night” (Take 3 Alternate take) – 3:46
10. “In The Still Of The Night” (Take 4 Alternate take) – 3:21
11. “In The Still Of The Night” (Take 5 False start) – :45
12. “In The Still Of The Night” (Take 6 Alternate take) –3:26
13. “In The Still Of The Night” (Take 7 Master) – 3:22
14. “Old Folks” (Take 1 Incomplete) – :26
15. “Old Folks” (Take 2 False start) – :09
16. “Old Folks” (Take 3 Alternate take) – 4:04
17. “Old Folks” (Take 4 Incomplete - Bird Continues Playing Into Take 5 False start) – :21
18. “Old Folks” (Take 6 Alternate take) – 3:28
19. “Old Folks” (Take 7 Incomplete) – :26
20. “Old Folks” (Take 8 Alternate take) – 3:39
21. “Old Folks” (Take 9 Master) – 3:34
22. “If I Love Again” – 2:31

Disc: 10

1. “Chi Chi” (Take 1 Alternate take - LP) – 3:09
2. “Chi Chi” (Take 2 False start) – :27
3. “Chi Chi” (Take 3 Alternate take) – 2:42
4. “Chi Chi” (Take 4 Alternate take) – 2:37
5. “Chi Chi” (Take 5 False start) – :17
6. “Chi Chi” (Take 6 Master) – 3:02
7. “I Remember You” – 3:03
8. “Now's The Time” – 3:01
9. “Confirmation” (Take 1 False start) – :14
10. “Confirmation” (Take 2 False start) – :09
11. “Confirmation” (Take 3 Master) – 2:58
12. “I Get A Kick Out Of You” (Take 1 Alternate take) – 4:55
13. “I Get A Kick Out Of You” (Take 2 False start And Rehearsal) – :32
14. “I Get A Kick Out Of You” (Take 3 False start And Rehearsal) – :16
15. “I Get A Kick Out Of You” (Take 4 Incomplete) – 1:05
16. “I Get A Kick Out Of You” (Take 5 False start) – :17
17. “I Get A Kick Out Of You” (Take 6 Incomplete) – 1:08
18. “I Get A Kick Out Of You” (Take 7 Master) – 3:34
19. “Just One Of Those Things” – 2:46
20. “My Heart Belongs To Daddy” (Take 1 False start And Rehearsal) – :36
21. “My Heart Belongs To Daddy” (Take 2 Master) – 3:18
22. “I've Got You Under My Skin” – 3:38
23. “Love For Sale” (Take 1 False start) – :17
24. “Love For Sale” (Take 2 Alternate take) – 5:47
25. “Love For Sale” (Take 3 Incomplete) – 1:03
26. “Love For Sale” (Take 4 Alternate take) – 5:32
27. “Love For Sale” (Take 5 Master) – 5:35
28. “I Love Paris” (Take 2 Alternate take) – 5:07
29. “I Love Paris” (Take 3 Master) – 5:07

== Personnel ==
Recorded between 1945 and 1954

- Charlie Parker — Alto saxophone
- Harry Terrill (Alto saxophone)
- Johnny Hodges (Alto saxophone)
- Sonny Salad (Alto saxophone)
- Willie Smith (Alto saxophone)
- Benny Carter (Alto saxophone)
- Fred Skerritt (Alto saxophone)
- Gene Johnson (Alto saxophone)
- Murray Williams (Alto saxophone)
- Toots Mondello (Alto saxophone)
- Ben Webster (Tenor saxophone)
- Coleman Hawkins (Tenor saxophone)
- Flip Phillips (Tenor saxophone)
- Hank Ross (Tenor saxophone)
- Sol Rabinowitz (Tenor saxophone)
- Pete Mondello (Tenor saxophone)
- Jose Madera (Tenor saxophone)
- Danny Bank (Baritone saxophone)
- Stanley Webb (Baritone saxophone)
- Leslie Johnakins (Baritone saxophone)
- Manny Albam (Baritone saxophone)
- Dizzy Gillespie (Trumpet)
- Miles Davis (Trumpet)
- Doug Mettome (Trumpet)
- Roy Eldridge (Trumpet)
- Al Killian (Trumpet)
- Al Porcino (Trumpet)
- Al Stewart (Trumpet)
- Benny Harris (Trumpet)
- Charlie Shavers (Trumpet)
- Chris Griffin (Trumpet)
- Bernie Privin (Trumpet)
- Bobby Woodlen (Trumpet)
- Buck Clayton (Trumpet)
- Carl Poole (Trumpet)
- Howard McGhee (Trumpet)
- Ray Wetzel (Trumpet)
- Red Rodney (Trumpet)
- Paquito Davilla (Trumpet)
- Mario Bauzá (Trumpet)
- Jimmy Maxwell (Trumpet)
- Kenny Dorham (Trumpet)
- Harry "Sweets" Edison (Trumpet)
- Will Bradley (Trombone)
- Lou McGarity (Trombone)
- Bill Harris (Trombone)
- Tommy Turk (Trombone)
- Bart Varsalona (Bass trombone)
- Hal McKusick (Clarinet)
- John LaPorta (Clarinet)
- Tommy Mace (Oboe)
- Eddie Brown (Oboe)
- Mitch Miller (Oboe/English horn)
- Junior Collins (French horn)
- Joseph Singer (French horn)
- Manny Thaler (Bassoon)
- Art Drelinger (Reeds)
- Al Haig (Piano)
- Arnold Ross (Piano)
- Mel Powell (Piano)
- Hank Jones (Piano)
- Bernie Leighton (Piano)
- John Lewis (Piano)
- Lou Stein (Piano)
- Stan Freeman (Piano)
- Walter Bishop Jr. (Piano)
- Ken Kersey (Piano)
- René Hernández (Piano)
- Tony Aless (Piano)
- Oscar Peterson (Piano)
- Art Ryerson (Guitar)
- Barney Kessel (Guitar)
- Freddie Green (Guitar)
- Jerome Darr (Guitar)
- Irving Ashby (Guitar)
- Bob Haggart (Bass)
- Charles Mingus (Bass)
- Curly Russell (Bass)
- Tommy Potter (Bass)
- Percy Heath (Bass)
- Ray Brown (Bass)
- Roberto Rodriguez (Bass)
- Teddy Kotick (Bass)
- William K. "Billy" Hadnott (Bass)
- Buddy Rich (Drums)
- Don Lamond (Drums)
- J.C. Heard (Drums)
- Roy Haynes (Drums)
- Max Roach (Drums)
- Shelly Manne (Drums)
- Kenny Clarke (Drums)
- Lee Young (Drums)
- Jose Mangual (Bongos)
- Luis Miranda (Conga)
- Rafael Miranda (Conga)
- Chano Pozo (Conga)
- Machito (Maracas)
- Dave Uchitel (Viola)
- Frank Brieff (Viola)
- Fred Ruzilla (Viola)
- Isadore Zir (Viola)
- Dave Uchitel (Viola)
- Nat Nathanson (Viola)
- Frank Miller (Cello)
- Maurice Brown (Cello)
- Joe Benaventi (Cello)
- Bronislaw Gimpel (Violin)
- Gene Orloff (Violin)
- Harry Katzman (Violin)
- Harry Melnikoff (Violin)
- Sid Harris (Violin)
- Sam Caplan (Violin/Cornet)
- Samuel Rand (Violin)
- Stan Karpenia (Violin)
- Ted Blume (Violin)
- Zelly Smirnoff (Violin)
- Howard Kay (Violin)
- Max Hollander (Violin)
- Jack Zayde (Violin)
- Manny Fidler (Violin)
- Milton Lomask (Violin)
- Ubaldo Nieto (Timbales)
- Myor Rosen (Harp)
- Verlye Mills (Harp)
- Wallace McManus (Harp)
- Butch Birdsall (Vocals)
- Dave Lambert (Vocals)
- Jerry Parker (Vocals)
- Annie Ross (Vocals)
- Chico O'Farrill (Arranger/Conductor)
- Gil Evans (Arranger/Conductor)
- Jimmy Carroll (Arranger/Conductor)
- Mitchell Kanner & Michael Bays (Album Design & Art Direction)
- Joe Lipman (Arranger/Conductor/Chimes/Xylophone)
- Neal Hefti (Arranger/Conductor)
- Phil Schaap (Producer/Liner notes)
