= Born to Be Blue (Mel Tormé song) =

"Born to Be Blue" is a 1946 traditional pop torch song written by Mel Tormé and Robert Wells. It was first recorded by Tormé and Sonny Burke in 1946. It was revived by both singers and instrumentalists starting in the mid-1950s, and is considered a jazz standard.

== Cover versions ==
| Performer | Album | Year |
|---|---|---|
| Anita Wardell | Kinda Blue | 2008 |
| Anton Schwartz | The Slow Lane | 2000 |
| Benny Green | Source | 2011 |
| Bobby Timmons | Born to Be Blue! | 1963 |
| Charlie Byrd | Byrd Song | 1965 |
| Chet Baker | Baby Breeze | 1965 |
| Clifford Brown | Brownie: The Complete EmArcy Recordings | 1989 |
| Dexter Gordon | Lullaby for a Monster | 1981 |
| Eddie Harris | The In Sound | 1965 |
| Ella Fitzgerald | Clap Hands, Here Comes Charlie! | 1961 |
| Freddie Hubbard | Born to Be Blue | 1982 |
| Gene Ammons | Twisting the Jug | 1961 |
| Helen Merrill | Helen Merrill | 1955 |
| Jack Bruce | Things We Like | 1968 |
| Mildred Bailey | Me and the Blues | 1957 |
| Ray Charles | Ingredients in a Recipe for Soul | 1963 |
| Rebecca Martin & Paul Motian Trio 2000 + One | On Broadway Vol. 4 or The Paradox of Continuity | 2006 |
| Stan Getz | Cool Velvet – Stan Getz and Strings | 1961 |
| Wes Montgomery | Full House | 1962 |
| Wynton Kelly | Piano Interpretations | 1951 |

== See also ==
- List of jazz standards
