= Chun-King =

Studio album by Bobby Timmons
- Released: 1964
- Recorded: August 12, 1964
- Studio: Van Gelder Studio, Englewood Cliffs, New Jersey
- Genre: Jazz
- Length: 37:09
- Label: Prestige
- Producer: Ozzie Cadena

Bobby Timmons chronology
| Little Barefoot Soul (1964) | Chun-King (1964) | Workin' Out! (1964) |

Chun-King is an album by American jazz pianist Bobby Timmons recorded in 1964 and released on the Prestige label.

== Reception ==
The Allmusic review by Jason Ankeny awarded the album 4 stars calling it "an intimate, soulful session that spotlights the range and command of all involved".

Professional ratings
Review scores
| Source | Rating |
|---|---|
| Allmusic | 4/5 stars |

== Track listing ==
All compositions by Bobby Timmons except where noted.

1. "Chun-King" (Keter Betts, Charlie Byrd) – 6:36
2. "Walking Death" – 6:07
3. "O Grande Amor" (Vinicius de Moraes, Antonio Carlos Jobim) – 6:55
4. "Gettin' It Togetha'" – 6:50
5. "I Could Have Danced All Night" (Alan Jay Lerner, Frederick Loewe) – 6:24
6. "Someone to Watch Over Me" (George Gershwin, Ira Gershwin) – 4:17

== Personnel ==
- Bobby Timmons – piano
- Keter Betts – bass
- Albert Heath – drums
