= Stan Getz at Large =

Live album by Stan Getz
- Released: 1960
- Recorded: January 14 & 15, 1960
- Venue: Kildevæld Church, Copenhagen, Denmark
- Genre: Jazz
- Label: Verve; V/V6 8393

Stan Getz chronology
Imported from Europe (1958)	Stan Getz at Large (1960)	Cool Velvet (1960)

Stan Getz at Large is an album by saxophonist Stan Getz which was released on the Verve label as a 2LP set in 1960. Since both albums ran slightly over 40 minutes, an exact 2CD replica with the shown cover art was created without bonus tracks, which were added to a later edition.

== Reception ==
Professional ratings
Review scores
Source	Rating
AllMusic	3/5 stars
The Penguin Guide to Jazz Recordings	3.5/4 stars

The AllMusic review by Scott Yanow stated: "The cool-toned tenor swings as hard as usual and the music is quite pleasing".

== Track listing ==
LP / CD One

1. "Night and Day" (Cole Porter) - 10:29
2. "Pammie's Tune" (Stan Getz) - 7:05
3. "Amour" (Al Cohn) - 5:45
4. "I Like to Recognize the Tune" (Richard Rodgers, Lorenz Hart) - 6:38
5. "When the Sun Comes Out" (Harold Arlen, Ted Koehler) - 6:38
6. "Just a Child" (Johnny Mandel) - 3:53
7. "The Folks Who Live on the Hill" (Jerome Kern, Oscar Hammerstein II) - 4:16

LP / CD Two

1. "Cafe Montmartre Blues" (Stan Getz) - 7:59
2. "He Was Too Good to Me (Rodgers, Hart) - 4:29
3. "Younger Than Springtime" (Rodgers, Hammerstein) - 5:06
4. "Goodbye" (Gordon Jenkins) - 3:36
5. "Land's End" (Harold Land) - 7:00
6. "In Your Own Sweet Way" (Dave Brubeck) - 6:01
7. "In the Night" (Traditional) - 5:25

Bonus tracks on later CD edition

1. "Born to Be Blue" (Mel Tormé, Robert Wells) - 4:56 Bonus track on CD reissue
2. "The Thrill Is Gone" (Ray Henderson, Lew Brown) - 6:36 Bonus track on CD reissue
3. "A New Town Is a Blue Town" (Richard Adler, Jerry Ross) - 5:11 Bonus track on CD reissue

== Personnel ==
- Stan Getz - tenor saxophone
- Jan Johansson - piano
- Daniel Jordan - bass
- William Schiopffe - drums
