= Bill Reichenbach =

Bill Reichenbach may refer to:

- William Frank Reichenbach Sr. (1923–2008), drummer for Charlie Byrd
- Bill Reichenbach Jr. (born 1949), his son, trombonist
