= Buddy Deppenschmidt =

American jazz drummer (1936–2021)

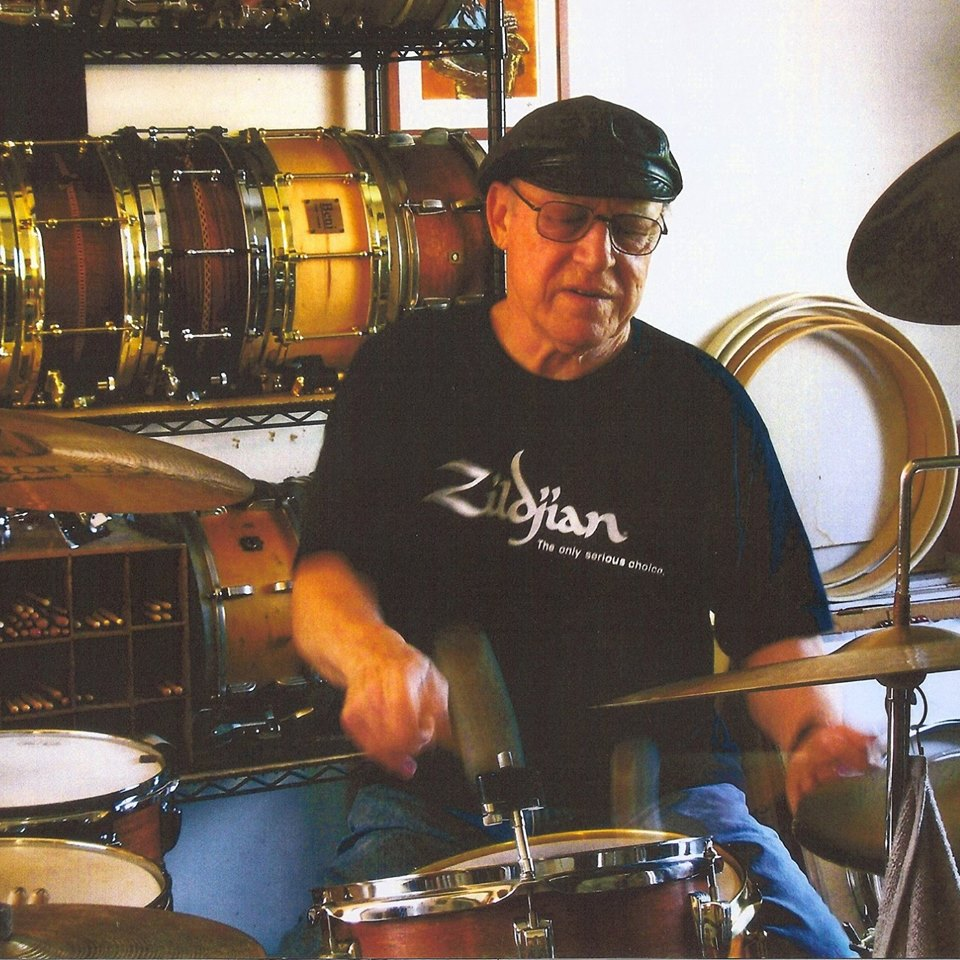

William Henry Deppenschmidt (February 16, 1936 – March 20, 2021) was an American jazz drummer.

== Life and career ==
Deppenschmidt's father, a saxophone player, led an orchestra under the name Buddy Williams after playing with and arranging for Paul Whiteman, Jimmy and Tommy Dorsey, and Glenn Miller. When he was four, Deppenschmidt and his mother moved from Philadelphia to Richmond, Virginia.

Self-taught, he started playing drums professionally while in his teens and then went on the road with Ronnie Bartley's Orchestra, a territory band which travelled in the western U.S. Returning to Richmond, he played with local bands and became the drummer for the Newton Thomas Trio (1954–59) which was also the rhythm section for the Billy Butterfield Quintet. The trio toured with Butterfield throughout the northeast and midwest (1958–59). When the Newton Thomas Trio played the Virginia Beach Jazz Festival, it received rave reviews on a bill that included the Dave Brubeck Quartet and the Charlie Byrd Trio. Two nights later, Charlie Byrd came into the Jolly Roger, the jazz club where Deppenschmidt was playing, and offered him the job as drummer with his trio. He played with the trio at the Showboat Lounge in Washington, D.C. from 1959 to 1962.

Starting in February 1961, the Charlie Byrd Trio (Charlie Byrd, guitar, Keter Betts, bass, and Buddy Deppenschmidt, drums) visited South America, Central America, and Mexico on a goodwill tour sponsored by the U.S. State Department. This three-month cultural exchange included eighteen countries. While in Brazil, Deppenschmidt spent his free time with local musicians, teaching them American jazz and learning bossa nova from them. It was his idea to record an album combining jazz and bossa nova with Stan Getz.

Jazz Samba was recorded live in less than three hours on February 13, 1962, and started a bossa nova craze both nationally and internationally. It is the only jazz album to reach number one on both the jazz and pop Billboard charts and it remained high on the charts for 70 weeks. "Desafinado", the hit single from the album, was inducted into the Grammy Hall of Fame in 2000 and the album was inducted into the Grammy Hall of Fame in 2010.

After working with Byrd, Deppenschmidt joined the Tee Carson Trio (1963–64), performing at the Marquis Lounge at the Shoreham Hotel in D.C. where they shared the bill with political satirist Mark Russell. He then moved to Bucks County, Pennsylvania, and formed the band Jazz Renaissance, playing nightclubs, concerts, and festivals with varying personnel and instrumentation. He was also the drummer with the John Coates Trio (1964–78). He toured the midwest and west coast with the Bernard Peiffer trio (1967). From 1970 to 1973 he studied with Joe Morello.

His work has been transcribed in Modern Drummer magazine and Creative Coordination for the Modern Drummer by Keith Copeland (Carl Fisher 1986). He has biographical listings in The Encyclopedia of Jazz in the Sixties and The New Grove Dictionary of Jazz. His drum work can be heard on the soundtracks of the following movies: A Thousand Clowns (1965), Wall Street (1987), Bossa Nova (2000), The Lake House (2006), and Whatever Works (2009). Deppenschmidt has played with Mose Allison, Chet Baker, Keter Betts, Billy Butterfield, Charlie Byrd, John Coates, Jr., Al Cohn, Matt Dennis, Bob Dorough, Herb Ellis, Tal Farlow, Stan Getz, Al Haig, Lionel Hampton, Barry Harris, Coleman Hawkins, Milt Hinton, Shirley Horn, J.J. Johnson, Larry McKenna, James Moody, King Pleasure, Maxine Sullivan, Clark Terry, Joe Venuti, and Phil Woods.

== Death ==
He died from complications of COVID-19 in Doylestown, Pennsylvania, on March 20, 2021, aged 85, during the COVID-19 pandemic in Pennsylvania.

== Discography ==
- The Guitar Artistry of Charlie Byrd (Riverside, 1960)
- Charlie Byrd at the Village Vanguard (Riverside, 1961)
- Blues Sonata (Riverside, 1961)
- Jazz Samba (Verve, 1962)
- Latin Impressions (Riverside, 1962)
- Once More! Charlie Byrd's Bossa Nova (Riverside, 1963)
