= Goin' to Kansas City =

Goin'to Kansas City

Studio album by Buck Clayton with Tommy Gwaltney's Kansas City 9
- Released: 1960
- Recorded: October 5 & 6, 1960; New York City
- Genre: Jazz
- Length: 37:13
- Label: Riverside; RLP 353
- Producer: Tommy Gwaltney

Buck Clayton chronology
Swingin' with Pee Wee (1960)	Goin'to Kansas City (1960)	Buck & Buddy (1960)

Goin' to Kansas City is an album by American jazz trumpeter Buck Clayton with Tommy Gwaltney's Kansas City 9 featuring tracks recorded in late 1960 for the Riverside label.

== Reception ==
Professional ratings
Review scores
Source	Rating
Allmusic	4/5 stars

Allmusic awarded the album 4 stars with the review by Scott Yanow stating, "Although the nonet performs a variety of songs associated with Kansas City Jazz of the swing era, the arrangements are modern and unpredictable".

== Track listing ==
1. "Hello Babe" (Dicky Wells) - 3:00
2. "An Old Manuscript" (Andy Razaf, Don Redman) - 3:26
3. "Kansas City Ballad" (Tommy Newsom) - 3:06
4. "The Jumping Blues" (Jay McShann, Charlie Parker) - 4:07
5. "Walter Page" (Tommy Gwaltney) - 4:27
6. "Midnight Mama" (Jelly Roll Morton) - 4:39
7. "John's Idea" (Count Basie, Eddie Durham) - 3:05
8. "Steppin' Pretty" (Mary Lou Williams) - 3:12
9. "Dedicated to You" (Sammy Cahn, Saul Chaplin, Hy Zaret) - 3:34
10. "The New Tulsa Blues" (Bennie Moten) - 4:37

== Personnel ==
- Buck Clayton - trumpet
- Bobby Zottola - trumpet, peck horn
- Dicky Wells - trombone
- Tommy Newsom - clarinet, tenor saxophone
- Tommy Gwaltney - alto saxophone, clarinet, vibraphone, xylophone
- John Bunch - piano
- Charlie Byrd - guitar
- Whitey Mitchell - bass
- Buddy Schutz - drums

Technical

- Phil Ramone - engineer

== Landmark ==
After an urban renewal project in the 1960s, Vine Street no longer intersects 12th Street, but at the former intersection the city created the Goin' to Kansas City Plaza.
