= Blues Sonata =

Studio album by Charlie Byrd
- Released: 1963
- Recorded: October 23 & 24, 1961; New York City
- Genre: Jazz
- Length: 40:35
- Label: Offbeat; OLP 3009; Riverside; RLP 453
- Producer: Bil Grauer

Charlie Byrd chronology
Charlie Byrd at the Village Vanguard (1961)	Blues Sonata (1963)	Jazz Samba (1962)

Blues Sonata is an album by American jazz guitarist Charlie Byrd featuring tracks recorded in 1961 and released on the Riverside label in 1963. The album was first released on the Washington Records Offbeat imprint but only received limited distribution prior to Byrd signing with Riverside.

== Reception ==
Professional ratings
Review scores
Source	Rating
Allmusic	3/5 stars

Allmusic awarded the album 3 stars stating "this is really two albums in one sleeve, showcasing two rather different formats for this highly original guitarist to pursue".

== Track listing ==
All compositions by Charlie Byrd except as indicated

1. "The Blues Sonata: Polonaise for Pour Pietro" - 7:01
2. "The Blues Sonata: Ballad in B Minor" - 5:01
3. "The Blues Sonata: Scherzo for an Old Shoe" - 9:08
4. "Alexander's Ragtime Band" (Irving Berlin) - 5:26
5. "Jordu" (Duke Jordan) - 4:37
6. "That Ole Devil Called Love" (Doris Fisher, Allan Roberts) - 4:52
7. "Zing! Went the Strings of My Heart" (James F. Hanley) - 4:30

== Personnel ==
- Charlie Byrd - guitar
- Barry Harris - piano (tracks 4–7)
- Keter Betts - bass
- Buddy Deppenschmidt - drums
