= Blue Byrd =

Studio album by Charlie Byrd
- Released: April 30, 1979
- Studio: Coast Recorders in San Francisco, California
- Genre: Jazz
- Length: 36:40
- Label: Concord Jazz
- Producer: Carl E. Jefferson

Charlie Byrd chronology
Great Guitars 2 (1976)	Blue Byrd (1979)	Sugarloaf Suite (1979)

Blue Byrd is an album by American jazz guitarist Charlie Byrd. He is joined by his brother, Joe Byrd, on bass and Wayne Phillips on drums for this recording.

== Critical reception ==
Professional ratings
Review scores
Source	Rating
AllMusic	4.5/5 stars
The Penguin Guide to Jazz	2.5/4 stars

Scott Yanow of AllMusic writes that "This delightful LP is one of Charlie Byrd's finest albums for Concord."

An article about jazz guitar from All About Jazz remarks, "A great Charlie Byrd album is Blue Byrd (Concord Jazz, 1978)."

== Track listing ==
Side one
No.	Title	Writer(s)	Length
1.	"It Don't Mean a Thing (If It Ain't Got That Swing)"	Duke Ellington; Irving Mills	3:42
2.	"Vou Vivendo"	Alfredo Vianna	3:26
3.	"Nice Work If You Can Get It"	George Gershwin; Ira Gershwin	3:05
4.	"Jitterbug Waltz"	Thomas "Fats" Waller	4:31
5.	"Soft Lights and Sweet Music"	Irving Berlin	4:08

Side two
No.	Title	Writer(s)	Length
6.	"I Ain't Got Nothin' but the Blues"	Duke Ellington; Larry Fotine; Don George	3:17
7.	"This Can't Be Love"	Richard Rodgers; Lorenz Hart	2:59
8.	"Carinhoso"	Alfredo Vianna	3:41
9.	"Mama, I'll Be Home Someday"	Charlie Byrd	2:05
10.	"Isn't This a Lovely Day?"	Irving Berlin	3:14
11.	"Saturday Night Fish Fry"	Louis Jordan	2:32
Total length:			36:40

== Musicians ==
- Charlie Byrd: Guitar
- Gene “Joe” Byrd: Bass, Vocals on I Ain't Got Nothin' but the Blues
- Wayne Phillips: Drums

== Production ==
- Carl E. Jefferson: Producer
- Phil Edwards: Mixer, Recording Engineer
- Judy O'Rourke: Design/Illustration

All track information and credits were taken from the CD liner notes.
