= From the Bottom =

Studio album by Bobby Timmons
- Released: 1970
- Recorded: 1964
- Genre: Jazz
- Length: 33:05
- Label: Riverside
- Producer: Orrin Keepnews

Bobby Timmons chronology
Born to Be Blue! (1963)	From the Bottom (1970)	Little Barefoot Soul (1964)

From the Bottom is an album by American jazz pianist Bobby Timmons recorded in 1964 and released in 1970 on the Riverside label. The album features Timmons on piano (trio and solo), vibraphone, and his only recording on organ.

According to producer Orrin Keepnews, the original sessions took place in 1964, but he was unable to finish "editing and programming" the album until 1970. "The reasons for this," he states in the liner notes, "lie in the rather well-known demise of the original Riverside operation in 1964; this recording was one of the casualties, being lost until I was recently given the opportunity to do some searching and rediscovering."

== Reception ==
The AllMusic review by Scott Yanow awarded the album 3 stars stating: "Bobby Timmons, a highly influential funk pianist, is in generally excellent form".

Professional ratings
Review scores
Source	Rating
AllMusic	3/5 stars
The Penguin Guide to Jazz	3/4 stars

== Track listing ==
All compositions by Bobby Timmons except as indicated

1. "From the Bottom" – 4:59
2. "Corcovado (Quiet Nights of Quiet Stars)" (Antonio Carlos Jobim) – 4:17
3. "Medley: You're Blasé / Bewitched" (Ord Hamilton, Bruce Sievier / Lorenz Hart, Richard Rodgers) – Sievier 3:37
4. "If I Should Lose You" (Ralph Rainger, Leo Robin) – 4:51
5. "Samba Triste" (Billy Blanco, Baden Powell de Aquino) – 3:19
6. "Someone to Watch Over Me" (George Gershwin, Ira Gershwin) – 6:31
7. "Moanin'" – 5:31

- Recorded in New York City in early 1964.

== Personnel ==
- Bobby Timmons – piano (tracks 1–6), organ (track 7), vibes (tracks 2 & 6)
- Sam Jones – bass (tracks 1, 2 & 4–7)
- Jimmy Cobb – drums (tracks 1, 2 & 4–7)
