= Inglewood Jam: Live at the Trade Winds 16 June 1952 =

Live album by Charlie Parker
- Released: 1978
- Recorded: June 16, 1952
- Venue: Trade Winds, California
- Genre: Jazz
- Length: 42:06
- Label: Jazz Showcase
- Producer: Harry Babasin

Charlie Parker chronology
Summit Meeting at Birdland (1977)	Inglewood Jam: Live at the Trade Winds 16 June 1952 (1978)	The Washington Concerts (1983)

Inglewood Jam: Live at the Trade Winds 16 June 1952 is a live album by jazz saxophonist Charlie Parker, recorded in California in 1952 with trumpet player Chet Baker and Sonny Criss. It was released by the Jazz Showcase label in 1978.

== Critical reception ==
Jazz critic Scott Yanow noted that "there are plenty of heated moments on this bop set." The Penguin Guide to Jazz described the young Baker as "a modestly accomplished bebopper," and described Criss as "distinctive." The guide noted the "marvellous tension" between Baker and Parker during their solos on "Donna Lee," while both critics described the session as "historic."

Professional ratings
Review scores
Source	Rating
Allmusic	3/5 stars
The Penguin Guide to Jazz	3/4 stars

== Track listing ==
=== Side A ===
1. "The Squirrel" (Tadd Dameron) – 14:45
2. "Irresistible You" (Gene DePaul, Don Raye) – 6:18

=== Side B ===
1. "Back Home Again in Indiana" (James F. Hanley, Ballard MacDonald) / "Donna Lee" (Parker, Miles Davis) – 11:20
2. "Liza" (George Gershwin, Ira Gershwin, Gus Kahn) – 10:03

== Personnel ==
- Charlie Parker, Sonny Criss – alto saxophone
- Chet Baker – trumpet
- Al Haig – piano (1, 2, 4)
- Russ Freeman – piano (3)
- Harry Babasin – bass
- Larance Marable – drums
