= Once More! Charlie Byrd's Bossa Nova =

Studio album by Charlie Byrd
- Released: 1963
- Recorded: February 21 and April 4, 1963; Edgewood Studios, Washington, D.C.
- Genre: Jazz
- Length: 45:54
- Label: Riverside; RLP 454
- Producer: Orrin Keepnews and Ed Michel

Charlie Byrd chronology
Bossa Nova Pelos Passaros (1962)	Once More! Charlie Byrd's Bossa Nova (1963)	Guitar/Guitar (1963)

Once More! Charlie Byrd's Bossa Nova is an album by American jazz guitarist Charlie Byrd featuring tracks recorded in 1963 and released on the Riverside label.

== Reception ==
Professional ratings
Review scores
Source	Rating
Allmusic	2/5 stars

Allmusic awarded the album 2 stars.

== Track listing ==
All compositions by Charlie Byrd except as indicated

1. "Outra Vez (Once More)" (Antonio Carlos Jobim) - 3:16
2. "Presente de Natal (Birthday Gift)" (Nelcy Noronha) - 3:29
3. "Insensatez (Insensitive)" (Jobim, Vinícius de Moraes) - 2:58
4. "Three Note Samba" - 2:23
5. "Samba de Minha Terra (Samba of My Country)" (Dorival Caymmi) - 2:03
6. "Limehouse Blues" (Philip Braham, Douglas Furber) - 3:02
7. "Saudade da Bahia (Longing for Bahia)" (Caymmi) - 2:27
8. "Anna" (Roman Vatro, Francesco Giordano) - 4:42
9. "Socegadamente (Softly)" - 2:42
10. "Chega de Saudade (No More Blues)" (Jobim, de Moraes) - 3:16
11. "Canção de Ninar Para Carol (Lullaby for Carol)" - 4:22

== Personnel ==
- Charlie Byrd - guitar
- Gene Byrd - guitar, bass
- Keter Betts - bass
- Buddy Deppenschmidt, Bill Reichenbach - drums, percussion
- Hal Posey - trumpet, flugelhorn (tracks 2, 5, 8 & 11)
- Tommy Gwaltney - vibraphone (tracks 2, 5, 8 & 11)
- Samuel Ramsey - French horn (tracks 1, 3, 4, 7, 9 & 10)
- Morris Kirshbaum, John Martin, Dorothy Stahl, Franz Vlashek - cello (tracks 1, 3, 4, 7, 9 & 10)
