= The Guitar Artistry of Charlie Byrd =

Studio album by Charlie Byrd
- Released: 1960
- Recorded: 1960; Washington, D.C.
- Genre: Jazz
- Length: 45:49
- Label: Offbeat; OLP 3007; Riverside; RLP 451

Charlie Byrd chronology
Mr. Guitar (1960)	The Guitar Artistry of Charlie Byrd (1960)	Charlie Byrd at the Village Vanguard (1960)

The Guitar Artistry of Charlie Byrd is an album by American jazz guitarist Charlie Byrd featuring tracks recorded in 1960 and released on the Riverside label in 1963. The album was first released on the Washington Records Offbeat imprint as Charlie's Choice: Jazz at the Showboat, Vol. 4 but only received limited distribution prior to Byrd signing with Riverside.

== Reception ==
Professional ratings
Review scores
Source	Rating
Allmusic	4.5/5 stars
The Penguin Guide to Jazz Recordings	3/4 stars

Allmusic awarded the album 4½ stars stating "The melodic music is pleasing (if not too substantial), predictable and reasonably enjoyable".

== Track listing ==
1. "Taking a Chance on Love" (Vernon Duke, Ted Fetter, John Latouche) - 1:57
2. "Moonlight in Vermont" (John Blackburn, Karl Suessdorf) - 2:53
3. "Speak Low" (Ogden Nash, Kurt Weill) - 3:47
4. "Nuages" (Django Reinhardt) - 3:04
5. "Ev'rything I've Got" (Lorenz Hart, Richard Rodgers) - 2:22
6. "Makin' Whoopee" (Walter Donaldson, Gus Kahn) - 2:45
7. "Django" (John Lewis) - 3:25
8. "Nice Work If You Can Get It" (George Gershwin, Ira Gershwin) - 1:49
9. "The House of the Rising Sun" (Traditional) - 5:30
10. "Ring Them Harmonics" (Keter Betts) - 3:51
11. "Taboo" (Margarita Lecuona, Bob Russell) - 9:45
12. "To Ginny" (Charlie Byrd) - 5:25

== Personnel ==
- Charlie Byrd - guitar
- Keter Betts - bass
- Buddy Deppenschmidt - drums
