= Mr. Guitar (album) =

Studio album by Charlie Byrd
- Released: 1962
- Recorded: September 1960; Washington, D.C.
- Genre: Jazz
- Length: 41:24
- Label: Offbeat; OLP 3006; Riverside; RLP 450

Charlie Byrd chronology
Byrd in the Wind (1959)	Mr. Guitar (1962)	The Guitar Artistry of Charlie Byrd (1960)

Mr. Guitar is an album by American jazz guitarist Charlie Byrd featuring tracks recorded in 1960 and released on the Riverside label in 1962. The album was first released on the Washington Records Offbeat imprint as Jazz at the Showboat, Vol. 3 but only received limited distribution prior to Byrd signing with Riverside.

== Reception ==
Professional ratings
Review scores
Source	Rating
Allmusic	4.5/5 stars
The Penguin Guide to Jazz Recordings	3/4 stars

Allmusic awarded the album 4½ stars calling it "a delightful trio outing with an adroit and light feel".

== Track listing ==
All compositions written by Charlie Byrd except as indicated

1. "Blues for Felix" - 2:57
2. "Gypsy in My Soul" (Clay Boland, Moe Jaffe) - 2:54
3. "In a Mellotone" (Duke Ellington) - 3:13
4. "Prelude to a Kiss" (Ellington, Mack Gordon, Gordon Mills) - 4:43
5. "Travelin' On" - 2:34
6. "Play Fiddle, Play" (Arthur Altman, Emory Deutsch, Jack Lawrence) - 3:35
7. "Funky Flamenco" - 2:49
8. "My One and Only" (George Gershwin, Ira Gershwin) - 2:41
9. "Mama, I'll Be Home Some Day" - 3:11
10. "How Long Has This Been Going On?" (Gershwin, Gershwin) - 3:41
11. "Who Cares?" (Gershwin, Gershwin) - 2:12
12. "Lay the Lily Low" - 5:54

== Personnel ==
- Charlie Byrd - guitar
- Keter Betts - bass
- Bertell Knox - drums
