= The Artistry of Helen Merrill =

Studio album by Helen Merrill
- Released: 1965
- Recorded: August 1964
- Genre: Jazz
- Length: 28:41
- Label: Mainstream; 56014/S6014
- Producer: Harry Ringler

Roy Haynes chronology
Helen Merrill in Tokyo (1963)	The Artistry of Helen Merrill (1965)	The Feeling is Mutual (1965)

The Artistry of Helen Merrill is an album released by American vocalist Helen Merrill in 1965 on the Mainstream label. The album features Merrill's interpretation of songs from around the world.

== Reception ==
Professional ratings
Review scores
Source	Rating
AllMusic	4/5 stars
Record Mirror	3/5 stars

AllMusic awarded the album 4 stars and its review by Richard Mortifoglio states "very few jazz singers sound as natural singing non-jazz material as Merrill does. She sounds just like herself (which she always does anyway), with no particular adjustment to a straighter idiom, as if she had to shed herself of jazz sophistication in order to become more "innocent".".

== Track listing ==
1. "Quiet Nights (Corcovado)" (Antônio Carlos Jobim, Gene Lees, Buddy Kaye) – 2:42
2. "Careless Love" (W.C. Handy) – 3:30
3. "Scarlet Ribbons" (Evelyn Danzig, Jack Segal) – 2:55
4. "House of the Rising Sun" (Traditional) – 2:36
5. "I Left My Heart Behind" (Ruth Batchelor, Bob Roberts) – 2:17
6. "Cannatella" (Traditional) – 2:17
7. "The River" (Carlo Concina, Robert Mellin) – 2:59
8. "Minha Rocca" (Dolores Duran) – 2:27
9. "Itsi No Komoriuta" (Traditional) – 2:19
10. "Forbidden Games" (Narciso Yepes, Barry Parker) – 2:32
11. "John Anderson My Love" (Robert Burns) – 2:07

== Personnel ==
- Helen Merrill – vocals
- Jimmy Giuffre – clarinet
- Hal McKusick – flute
- Charlie Byrd, Jimmy Raney – guitar
- Dave Bailey, Osie Johnson – drums
- Keter Betts, Teddy Kotick – bass
