= Latin Impressions =

Studio album by Charlie Byrd
- Released: 1962
- Recorded: April 18, 1962; New York City
- Genre: Jazz
- Length: 40:35
- Labels: Riverside; RLP 427
- Producer: Bill Grauer

Charlie Byrd chronology
Jazz Samba (1962)	Latin Impressions (1962)	Bossa Nova Pelos Passaros (1962)

Latin Impressions is an album by American jazz guitarist Charlie Byrd featuring tracks recorded in 1962 and released on the Riverside label.

== Reception ==
Professional ratings
Review scores
Source	Rating
Down Beat	4.5/5 stars
AllMusic	3/5 stars

In its October 11, 1962 issue, DownBeat magazine gave the album 4.5 stars. AllMusic awarded the album 3 stars.

== Track listing ==
All compositions by Charlie Byrd except as indicated

1. "The Duck (O Pato)" (Jayme Silva, Neuza Teixeira) - 5:30
2. "Amor Flamenco" (Laurindo Almeida) - 2:04
3. "Azul Tiple" - 3:32
4. "Canción di Argentina" (Traditional) - 2:02
5. "Carnaval (Theme from Black Orpheus)" (Luiz Bonfá, Maria Toledo, Antônio Maria) - 2:34
6. "Homage à Villa Lobos" - 3:14
7. "Bogotá" (Ricardo Romero) - 3:48
8. "Mexican Song No. 2" (Manuel Ponce) - 2:46
9. "Mexican Song No. 1"(Ponce) - 0:56
10. "Samba de uma Nota Só" (Antonio Carlos Jobim, Newton Mendonça) - 2:54
11. "Galopera (Acuaiero Asuncena)" (Mauricio Cardozo Ocampo) - 2:11
12. "Vals" (Agustín Barrios) - 5:32

== Personnel ==
- Charlie Byrd - guitar, tiple
- Gene Byrd - guitar, bass
- Keter Betts - bass
- Bill Reichenbach - drums
