= Phil Silvers and Swinging Brass =

Studio album by Phil Silvers
- Released: 1957
- Recorded: 1956
- Genre: Pop/jazz
- Label: Columbia CL-1011
- Producer: Irving Townsend

Phil Silvers and Swinging Brass is a studio album of bugle calls arranged by Nelson Riddle, released in 1956.

== Conception ==
The album was designed to capitalize on the popularity of the comedian and actor Phil Silvers in the American TV sitcom You'll Never Get Rich.

The arranger Nelson Riddle is credited in the liner notes for the album as 'Compositions Conceived By ...'. Riddle was under contractual obligation to Capitol Records at the time of the recording and so could not be credited with the arrangements on the album. The arrangements were instead credited to Frank Comstock and Warren Barker. The guitarist Steve Jordan who appeared on the album wrote in his autobiography wrote that "I'm sure Riddle did most of the writing. But contracts are contracts".

Jordan was told by the album's producer Irving Townsend that Riddle had told him that the album could only be made in California as there weren't enough good jazz session musicians in New York City. Townsend was appalled and insisted that the album be recorded in New York.

== Reception ==
The Billboard magazine review from 5 August 1957 praised the album's "solid, swinging stuff produced by a stellar assemblage of instrumentalists". High Fidelity described the music as " ... hardly hot enough for true jazz, [though] they nevertheless make surprisingly diverting listening thanks largely to Riddle's imagination".

== Track listing ==
=== Side 1 ===
1. "Hurry Up and Wait"
2. "Early Bird"
3. "Last Chance"
4. "Chow, A Can of Cow and Thou"
5. "Two Arms"
6. "Scramble"

=== Side 2 ===
1. "Where'd Everybody Go"
2. "Come As You Are"
3. "No Letter Today"
4. "The Eagle Screams"
5. "Let It Rain, Let It Pour"
6. "Lights Out"

== Personnel ==
- Boomie Richman, Al Klink, Hal Feldman, Hymie Schertzer - saxophone
- Chauncey Welsch, Jack Satterfield, Urbie Green, Warren Covington, Will Bradley - trombone
- Bernie Glow, Charlie Shavers, Bob McMickle, Jimmy Maxwell - trumpet
- Artie Baker - clarinet
- Steve Jordan - guitar
- Hank Jones - piano
- Frank Carroll - double bass
- Don Lamond - drums
- Terry Snyder - bongos, chimes, vibraphone
- Frank Comstock, Warren Barker – arranger
- Irving Townsend - liner notes
- Richard Beattie - photography
