= Byrd's Word! =

Byrds's Word!

Studio album by Charlie Byrd
- Released: 1962
- Recorded: 1958
- Studio: Edgewood Recording Studios, Washington, D.C.
- Genre: Jazz
- Length: 41:24
- Label: Riverside
- Producer: Orrin Keepnews

Charlie Byrd chronology
Midnight Guitar (1957)	Byrds's Word! (1962)	Byrd in the Wind (1959)

Byrd's Word! is an album by American jazz guitarist Charlie Byrd with tracks recorded in 1958 and released on the Riverside label in 1962. The album was first released on the Washington Records Offbeat imprint as Jazz at the Showboat

== Reception ==
Professional ratings
Review scores
Source	Rating
Allmusic	4/5 stars

Allmusic awarded the album 4 stars stating "Byrd's Word! is an early Charlie Byrd recording that finds the guitarist in a variety of settings... Though there are really no bad cuts on the album, the content is so diverse – acoustic trios, electric guitar with brass, and acoustic guitar with vocals – that the album doesn't flow as a whole... The variety of material and styles gives the impression that Byrd was experimenting, but even so, his experimentation was conservative... Byrd's Word! may not be a great album, but it is certainly a good place to get a look at Byrd's early development".

== Track listing ==
All compositions written by Bobby Felder except as indicated

1. "Byrd's Word" – 5:32
2. "Blue Turning Grey Over You" (Andy Razaf, Fats Waller) – 2:55
3. "Bobby in Bassoonville" – 4:26
4. "Satin Doll" (Duke Ellington, Billy Strayhorn, Johnny Mercer) – 4:20
5. "Tri-X" – 4:29
6. "Conversation Piece" (Charlie Byrd, Keter Betts) – 3:36
7. "What's New?" (Bob Haggart, Johnny Burke) – 4:14
8. "Stompin' at the Savoy" (Benny Goodman, Chick Webb, Edgar Sampson, Razaf) – 3:21
9. "Don't Explain" (Arthur Herzog, Jr., Billie Holiday) – 3:27
10. "Buck's Hill" – 4:37

== Personnel ==
- Charlie Byrd – guitar
- Bobby Felder – valve trombone (tracks 1, 3, 5, 7 & 10)
- Kenneth Pasmanick – bassoon (track 3)
- Buck Hill – tenor saxophone (tracks 1, 5, 7 & 10)
- T. Carson (tracks 1, 3, 5, 7 & 10), Charlie Schneer (track 8) – piano
- Keter Betts – bass, cello (tracks 1, 3–8 & 10)
- Eddie Phyfe (tracks 4, 6 & 8) Bertell Knox (tracks 1, 3, 5, 7 & 10) – drums
- Ginny Byrd – vocals (tracks 2 & 9)
