= Charlie Byrd at the Village Vanguard =

Live album by Charlie Byrd
- Released: 1961
- Recorded: January 15, 1961; Village Vanguard, New York City
- Genre: Jazz
- Length: 44:45
- Label: Offbeat; OLP 3008; Riverside; RLP 452

Charlie Byrd chronology
The Guitar Artistry of Charlie Byrd (1960)	Charlie Byrd at the Village Vanguard (1961)	Blues Sonata (1961)

Charlie Byrd at the Village Vanguard is a live album by American jazz guitarist Charlie Byrd featuring tracks recorded at the Village Vanguard in 1961 and released on the Riverside label in 1963. The album was first released on the Washington Records Offbeat imprint but only received limited distribution prior to Byrd signing with Riverside.

== Reception ==
Professional ratings
Review scores
Source	Rating
Allmusic	3/5 stars
Down Beat	4/5 stars
The Penguin Guide to Jazz Recordings	3/4 stars

Allmusic awarded the album 3 stars stating "The direction is clear; Byrd was about to open the door to bossa nova, and you can hear him inching up to the starting gate here".

== Track listing ==
1. "Just Squeeze Me (But Don't Tease Me)" (Duke Ellington, Lee Gaines) – 13:00
2. "Why Was I Born?" (Oscar Hammerstein II, Jerome Kern) – 5:57
3. "You Stepped Out of a Dream" (Nacio Herb Brown, Gus Kahn) – 6:48
4. "Fantasia on Which Side Are You On?" (Charlie Byrd) – 20:32

== Personnel ==
- Charlie Byrd – guitar
- Keter Betts – bass
- Buddy Deppenschmidt – drums
