= Workin' Out! =

Studio album by Bobby Timmons
- Released: 1965
- Recorded: June 18 & October 21, 1964
- Studios: Van Gelder Studio, Englewood Cliffs, NJ
- Genre: Jazz
- Length: 77:10
- Label: Prestige
- Producer: Ozzie Cadena

Bobby Timmons chronology
Chun-King (1964)	Workin' Out! (1965)	Holiday Soul (1964)

Workin' Out! is an album by American jazz pianist Bobby Timmons recorded in 1964 and released in 1965 on the Prestige label.

== Reception ==
The Allmusic review by Scott Yanow awarded the album 4½ stars calling it "Bobby Timmons most advanced recordings of the 1960s".

Professional ratings
Review scores
Source	Rating
Allmusic	4.5/5 stars
The Penguin Guide to Jazz	3/4 stars
The Rolling Stone Jazz Record Guide	3/5 stars

== Track listing ==
All compositions by Bobby Timmons except as noted

1. "Lela" (Johnny Lytle) - 9:05
2. "Trick Hips" - 7:57
3. "People" (Bob Merrill, Jule Styne) - 2:40
4. "Bags' Groove" (Milt Jackson) - 9:11
5. "This Is All I Ask" (Gordon Jenkins) - 8:35

- Recorded at Rudy Van Gelder Studio in Englewood Cliffs, New Jersey on June 18, 1964 (track 3) and October 21, 1964 (tracks 1, 2, 4 & 5).

== Personnel ==
- Bobby Timmons - piano
- Johnny Lytle (tracks 1, 2, 4 & 5) - vibes
- Keter Betts (tracks 1, 2, 4 & 5), Sam Jones (track 3) - bass
- William "Peppy" Hinnant (tracks 1, 2, 4 & 5), Ray Lucas (track 3) - drums
