= Bill Potts (musician) =

- Born: April 3, 1928; Arlington, Virginia, US
- Died: February 16, 2005 (aged 76) Plantation, Florida, US
- Genres: Jazz
- Occupations: Musician, arranger
- Instrument: Piano

William Orie Potts (April 3, 1928, Arlington, Virginia – February 16, 2005, Plantation, Florida) was an American jazz pianist and arranger.

== Early life ==
Potts played Hawaiian slide-lap steel guitar as a child and accordion in his teens. At age 15, he won an accordion competition with a performance of "Twilight Time". He picked up piano in high school after hearing Count Basie on the radio. He attended Catholic University of America in 1946–1947, then formed his own group under the name Bill Parks, which toured in Massachusetts and Florida. While serving in the Army from 1949 to 1955 he transcribed charts for Army bands; he also composed and arranged for Joe Timer and Willis Conover's ensemble, THE Orchestra, which broadcast on Voice of America radio. He wrote four of the songs on THE Orchestra's 1954 Brunswick Records LP, and recorded some of their live shows, which occasionally featured guest appearances from Charlie Parker and Dizzy Gillespie.

== Career ==
By 1956, Potts was leading a house band at Olivia Davis' Patio Lounge in Washington, D.C. Lester Young booked an engagement there, and Potts convinced Young to record with him on two of the evenings. These recordings were later released as the Lester Young in Washington, D.C. sessions.

In 1957, Potts worked extensively as a composer, arranger, and performer for Freddy Merkle's Jazz Under the Dome album (which also featured Earl and Rob Swope). Soon after this he suffered a crushed vertebra in a car crash and ended up in a body cast for three months. During this time, he began working on charts and arrangements for an album consisting of jazz reinterpretations of many songs from George Gershwin's opera Porgy & Bess. He had fully recovered by 1959, when he released a session under his own name entitled The Jazz Soul of Porgy and Bess. This album, recorded for United Artists Records, featured a nineteen-piece band whose members included Al Cohn, Harry Edison, Art Farmer, Bill Evans, Bob Brookmeyer, Marky Markowitz, Zoot Sims, Charlie Shavers, Earl Swope, and Phil Woods. Down Beat magazine rated the album five out of five stars upon its release.

Following this, Potts spent several years working in New York City before returning to the D.C. area, where he worked locally in addition to touring with and/or arranging for Paul Anka, Eddie Fisher, Ella Fitzgerald, Stan Getz, Woody Herman, Quincy Jones, Stan Kenton, Ralph Marterie, Buddy Rich, Jeri Southern, Clark Terry, and Bobby Vinton. In 1967 he released an album on Decca Records, How Insensitive, with a studio group called Brasilia Nueve. This group included some of the players from the Porgy and Bess session (Markowitz, Sims), as well as Tito Puente, Chino Pozo, Mel Lewis, Barry Galbraith, and Louie Ramirez. He taught music theory at Montgomery College from 1974 to 1990 and was the leader of the student jazz band. He also led a big band for occasional performances at Washington's Blues Alley nightclub in the 1980s. He retired to Fort Lauderdale in 1995, and died of cardiac arrest in 2005.

== Discography ==
- The Jazz Soul of Porgy and Bess (United Artists, 1959)
- Bye Bye Birdie (Colpix, 1963)
- 555 Feet High (Jazz Crusade, 1988)

=== As sideman/arranger ===
With Freddy Merkle

- Jazz Under the Dome (RCA Victor, 1957)

With Lester Young

- Lester Young In Washington, D.C. 1956, Vols. 1-6 (Pablo, 1999)

With Brasilia Nueve

- How Insensitive (Decca, 1967)
