= Byrd at the Gate =

Live album by Charlie Byrd
- Released: 1963
- Recorded: May 9–10, 1963
- Venue: The Village Gate, New York City
- Genre: Jazz
- Length: 54:07
- Label: Riverside; RLP 467
- Producer: Orrin Keepnews

Charlie Byrd chronology
Guitar/Guitar (1963)	Byrd at the Gate (1963)	Byrd Song (1964)

Byrd at the Gate is an album by jazz guitarist Charlie Byrd, recorded at The Village Gate in 1963 and released on the Riverside label.

== Reception ==
Professional ratings
Review scores
Source	Rating
AllMusic	4/5 stars
The Penguin Guide to Jazz	2.5/4 stars

S. M. Haney of AllMusic wrote, "This is a listening pleasure to the first degree. Unlike any other, Charlie Byrd sincerely knows how to make his instrument speak, sending graceful chords and melodies to this attentive audience... Cheers to the Charlie Byrd Trio for a dynamic effort during this May 1963 gig. Applause, applause." The Penguin Guide to Jazz commented that the addition of a trumpeter and saxophonist to Byrd's normal trio format of the time contributed little.

== Track listing ==
All compositions by Charlie Byrd except as indicated

1. "Shiny Stockings" (Frank Foster) - 4:57
2. "More" (Nino Oliviero, Riz Ortolani) - 2:53
3. "Blues for Night People" - 7:07
4. "Butter and Egg Man" (Percy Venable) - 3:40
5. "Ela Me Deixou" - 3:34
6. "Broadway" (Billy Bird, Teddy McRae, Henri Woode) - 4:42
7. "I Left My Heart in San Francisco" (George Cory, Douglass Cross) - 2:59
8. "Some Other Spring" (Arthur Herzog Jr., Irene Kitchings) - 4:18
9. "Where Are the Hebrew Children? (Traditional) - 8:20
10. "Let's Do It (Let's Fall in Love)" (Cole Porter) - 4:26 Bonus track on CD reissue
11. "Jive at Five" (Count Basie, Harry "Sweets" Edison) - 7:11 Bonus track on CD reissue

== Personnel ==
- Charlie Byrd - guitar
- Keter Betts - bass
- Bill Reichenbach - drums
- Clark Terry - flugelhorn, trumpet (tracks 4, 6, 8)
- Seldon Powell - tenor saxophone (tracks 2, 4, 5, 8)
