= Little Barefoot Soul =

Studio album by Bobby Timmons
- Released: 1964
- Recorded: June 18, 1964
- Studios: Van Gelder Studio, Englewood Cliffs, NJ
- Genre: Jazz
- Length: 33:06
- Label: Prestige
- Producer: Ozzie Cadena

Bobby Timmons chronology
From the Bottom (1964)	Little Barefoot Soul (1964)	Chun-King (1964)

Little Barefoot Soul is an album by American jazz pianist Bobby Timmons recorded in 1964 and released on the Prestige label.

== Reception ==
The AllMusic review by Jason Ankeny awarded the album 4 stars stating "the album is a marvel of instinct and ingenuity. The music crackles with the energy of creation".

Professional ratings
Review scores
Source	Rating
AllMusic	4/5 stars
The Rolling Stone Jazz Record Guide	3/5 stars

== Track listing ==
All compositions by Bobby Timmons except as indicated

1. "A Little Barefoot Soul" – 5:06
2. "Walkin'-Wadin'-Sittin'-Ridin'" – 7:55
3. "Little One" – 3:55
4. "Cut Me Loose Charlie" – 4:49
5. "Ain't Thinkin' 'Bout It" – 8:53
6. "Nobody Knows the Trouble I've Seen" (Traditional) – 2:28

- Recorded at Rudy Van Gelder Studio in Englewood Cliffs, New Jersey on June 18, 1964.

== Personnel ==
- Bobby Timmons – piano
- Sam Jones – bass (1–5)
- Ray Lucas – drums (1–5)
