= Steve Jordan (guitarist) =

American jazz guitarist (1919–1993)

- Born: January 15, 1919; New York City, U.S.
- Died: September 13, 1993 (aged 74); Alexandria, Virginia, U.S.
- Genres: Jazz
- Occupation: Guitarist

Steve Philip Jordan (January 15, 1919 – September 13, 1993) was an American jazz guitarist.

== Career ==
Jordan was born in New York City. He considered himself a rhythm guitarist whose biggest influences were George Van Eps and Allan Reuss. He received lessons from Reuss, who played rhythm guitar for Benny Goodman In the early 1940s Jordan was a member of bands led by Will Bradley, Artie Shaw, and Teddy Powell. After serving with the Navy in World War II, he returned to music as a member of bands led by Bob Chester, Freddie Slack, Glen Gray, Stan Kenton, Jimmy Dorsey, and Boyd Raeburn.

When jobs for rhythm guitarists disappeared as big bands dwindled, Jordan became a studio musician for NBC. During the 1950s, he worked with Gene Krupa, Mel Powell, Vic Dickenson, Charles Thompson, Buck Clayton, Ruby Braff, and Benny Goodman. In the 1960s, he earned a living as a tailor, but from 1965 to 1972 he performed routinely with Tommy Gwaltney at Blues Alley in Washington, D.C. His last job as sideman was with DC area band leader/drummer Brooks Tegler where he played strictly rhythm guitar for eight years and recorded two CD's ("Keep Em Flying" and "And Not Only That!"), with Tegler, in that capacity. He was offered a job replacing Freddie Green in the Count Basie Orchestra, but he rejected it because he said he was too old to tour again. His memoir, Rhythm Man, was published in the early 1990s. Here Comes Mr. Jordan was his only album as a leader.

== Discography ==
=== As leader ===
- Here Comes Mister Jordan (Fat Cat's Jazz, 1972)

=== As sideman ===
With Ruby Braff

- At Newport (Verve, 1958)
- Braff!! (Epic, 1956)
- Hi-Fi Salute to Bunny (RCA Victor, 1957)

With Buck Clayton

- How Hi the Fi (Columbia, 1954)
- Jumpin' at the Woodside (Columbia, 1955)
- All the Cats Join in (Columbia, 1956)
- Cat Meets Chick (Columbia, 1956)
- Buck Meets Ruby (Family, 1973)
- Just a Groove (Vanguard, 1973)
- Jam Sessions from the Vault (Columbia, 1988)

With others

- Wild Bill Davison, Lady of the Evening (Jazzology, 1985)
- Vic Dickenson, The Vic Dickenson Showcase (Vanguard, 1953)
- Vic Dickenson, Slidin' Swing (Jazztone, 1957)
- Jimmy Dorsey, The Fabulous Jimmy Dorsey (Fraternity, 1957)
- Ronnie Gilbert, In Hi-Fi: The Legend of Bessie Smith (RCA Victor, 1958)
- Glen Gray, The Uncollected 1943–1946 Vol. 2 (Hindsight, 1978)
- Benny Goodman, B.G. in Hi-Fi (Capitol, 1955)
- Tommy Gwaltney, This Is Blues Alley (Blues Alley 1966)
- Clancy Hayes, Mr. Hayes Goes to Washington (Clanco, 1972)
- Gene Krupa, Drum Boogie (Clef, 1956)
- Gene Krupa, The Exciting Gene Krupa (Verve, 1983)
- Mel Powell, Jam Session at Carnegie Hall (Columbia 1954)
- Boyd Raeburn, Boyd Meets Stravinski (Savoy, 1955)
- Jimmy Rushing, The Jazz Odyssey of Jimmy Rushing (Philips, 1957)
- Pee Wee Russell, Plays Pee Wee (Bell, 1961)
- Phil Silvers, Phil Silvers and Swinging Brass (Columbia, 1957)
- Buddy Tate, Buddy Tate and His Buddies (Chiaroscuro, 1973)
- Brooks Tegler, Keep Em Flying (Jazzology 1990) And Not Only That! (Big Mo 1995)
