= Jazz Samba =

Studio album by Stan Getz & Charlie Byrd
- Released: April 20, 1962
- Recorded: February 13, 1962
- Studio: Pierce Hall, All Souls Unitarian Church, Washington, D.C.
- Genre: Bossa nova, samba-jazz
- Length: 33:12
- Label: MGM/Verve
- Producer: Creed Taylor

Stan Getz chronology
Recorded Fall 1961 (1961)	Jazz Samba (1962)	Big Band Bossa Nova (1962)

Charlie Byrd chronology
Blues Sonata (1961)	Jazz Samba (1962)	Latin Impressions (1962)

Jazz Samba is a bossa nova album by Stan Getz and Charlie Byrd, released by Verve Records in 1962. Jazz Samba signaled the beginning of the bossa nova craze in America. Stan Getz was the featured soloist and the tracks were arranged by Charlie Byrd, who had first heard bossa nova during a tour of Brazil in 1961.

Getz and Byrd were accompanied by two bassists: Keter Betts and Joe Byrd, Charlie Byrd's brother who also played guitar. They were joined by two drummers: Buddy Deppenschmidt and Bill Reichenbach. The album was recorded at All Souls Unitarian Church in Washington, D.C., on February 13, 1962, and released in April of that year.

Two songs, "Desafinado" (Off Key or Out of Tune) and "Samba de Uma Nota Só" (One Note Samba) were composed by Antonio Carlos Jobim and were released as singles in the U.S. and Europe. Charlie Byrd wrote one song, "Samba Dees Days", while the rest were by Brazilian composers. The painting on the cover is by Olga Albizu.

Stan Getz won the Grammy Award for Best Jazz Performance of 1963 for "Desafinado", and went on to make many other bossa nova recordings, notably with João Gilberto and Astrud Gilberto and the popular song "The Girl from Ipanema". "Desafinado" was also nominated for the Grammy Award for Record of the Year, while Jazz Samba was nominated for the Grammy Award for Album of the Year.

== Critical reception ==
Professional ratings
Review scores
Source	Rating
AllMusic	5/5 stars
DownBeat	4.5/5 stars
The Encyclopedia of Popular Music	5/5 stars
The Penguin Guide to Jazz Recordings	3.5/4 stars
The Rolling Stone Jazz Record Guide	4/5 stars

Robert Dimery included Jazz Samba in his book 1001 Albums You Must Hear Before You Die.

== Track listing ==
Side one

1. "Desafinado" (Antônio Carlos Jobim, Newton Mendonça) — 5:51
2. "Samba Dees Days" (Charlie Byrd) – 3:34
3. "O Pato" (Jayme Silva, Neuza Teixeira) – 2:31
4. "Samba Triste" (Baden Powell, Billy Blanco) – 4:47

Side two

1. "Samba de Uma Nota Só" (Antônio Carlos Jobim, Newton Mendonça) – 6:11
2. "É Luxo Só" (Ary Barroso) – 3:40
3. "Bahia" (aka 'Baia') (Ary Barroso) – 6:38

Bonus track on CD reissue

1. "Desafinado" (Antônio Carlos Jobim, Newton Mendonça) 45 rpm issue – 2:00

== Personnel ==
- Stan Getz – tenor saxophone
- Charlie Byrd – guitar
- Gene Byrd – guitar, bass
- Keter Betts – double bass
- Buddy Deppenschmidt – drums, percussion
- Bill Reichenbach Sr. – drums, percussion

== Chart positions ==
Year	Chart	Position
1963	Billboard Pop Albums (Billboard 200) (mono)	1
