= Solo Flight (Charlie Byrd album) =

Studio album by Charlie Byrd
- Released: 1964
- Recorded: 1964; New York City
- Genre: Jazz
- Length: 34:24
- Label: Riverside; RLP 498

Charlie Byrd chronology
Byrd Song (1964)	Solo Flight (1964)	Brazilian Byrd (1965)

Solo Flight is an album by American jazz guitarist Charlie Byrd featuring tracks recorded in 1964 and released on the Riverside label.

== Reception ==
Professional ratings
Review scores
Source	Rating
Allmusic	3/5 stars
Billboard	"Spotlight" pick
The Penguin Guide to Jazz Recordings	3/4 stars

Allmusic awarded the album 3 stars stating "Many fans of more progressive jazz will find this all a bit conservative, but Byrd fans happily note that his best work has a timeless quality. Solo Flight easily fits into that category.

== Track listing ==
1. "Am I Blue?" (Harry Akst, Grant Clarke) - 2:42
2. "Easy Living" (Ralph Rainger, Leo Robin) - 3:46
3. "The House of the Rising Sun" (Traditional) - 3:28
4. "Mood Indigo" (Barney Bigard, Duke Ellington, Irving Mills) - 3:26
5. "You Took Advantage of Me" (Lorenz Hart, Richard Rodgers) - 3:25
6. "Li'l Darlin'" (Neal Hefti) - 2:40
7. "Tears" (Stéphane Grappelli, Django Reinhardt) - 3:21
8. "Nocturne" (Stéphane Grappelli, Django Reinhardt) - 3:45
9. "Satin Doll" (Ellington, Johnny Mercer, Billy Strayhorn) - 2:40
10. "Blue Mobile" (Charlie Byrd) - 3:53
11. "Sweet Sue, Just You" (Will J. Harris, Victor Young) - 1:18

== Personnel ==
- Charlie Byrd - guitar
