= Bossa Nova Pelos Passaros =

Studio album by Charlie Byrd
- Released: 1962
- Recorded: April and October 1962; Plaza Sound Studio, New York City
- Genre: Jazz
- Length: 45:54
- Label: Riverside; RLP 436
- Producer: Bill Grauer

Charlie Byrd chronology
Latin Impressions (1962)	Bossa Nova Pelos Passaros (1962)	Once More! Charlie Byrd's Bossa Nova (1963)

Bossa Nova Pelos Passaros is an album by American jazz guitarist Charlie Byrd featuring tracks recorded in 1962 and released on the Riverside label.

== Chart performance ==
The album debuted on Billboard magazine's Monoraul Top LP's chart in the issue dated March 23, 1963, peaking at No. 128 during a five-week run on the chart.

== Reception ==
Professional ratings
Review scores
Source	Rating
Down Beat	4/5 stars
Allmusic	3/5 stars
The Rolling Stone Jazz Record Guide	4/5 stars
The Penguin Guide to Jazz Recordings	3/4 stars

Allmusic awarded the album three stars stating, "Byrd was at the top of his form in those days. Unlike some of his earlier sets, these pretty and melodic recordings are very concise (lacking a sense of adventure), clocking in between one-and-a-half and three-and-a-half minutes".

== Track listing ==
All compositions by Charlie Byrd except as indicated

1. "Yvone" - 1:57
2. "Um Abraço No Bonfá (A Salute to Bonfá)" (João Gilberto) - 2:22
3. "Meditation" (Antonio Carlos Jobim, Newton Mendonça) - 3:12
4. "Você e Eu (You and I)" (Carlos Lyra, Vinícius de Moraes) - 2:57
5. "Coisa Mais Linda (A Most Beautiful Thing)" - 2:40
6. "O Barquinho (Little Boat)" (Ronaldo Bôscoli, Roberto Menescal) - 1:56
7. "Desafinado (Slightly Out of Tune)" (Jobim, Mendonça) - 2:31
8. "Samba Triste" (Billy Blanco, Baden Powell) - 2:02
9. "Bim-Bom" ( Gilberto) - 1:51
10. "Hô-Bá-Lá-Lá" (Gilberto) - 2:14
11. "Ela Me Deixou (She Has Gone)" (Byrd, Benito DiPaula) - 2:34
12. "O Pássaro (The Bird)" - 3:11

== Personnel ==
- Charlie Byrd - guitar
- Gene Byrd - guitar (tracks 4, 10 and 12)
- Keter Betts - bass
- Bill Reichenbach - drums
- Earl Swope - trombone (tracks 4, 10 and 12)
- Charlie Hampton - alto saxophone, flute (tracks 4, 10 and 12)
- Willie Rodriguez - bongos (tracks 4, 10 and 12)
- Orchestra conducted by Walter Raim (tracks 1, 3, 6 and 8)

== Charts ==
Chart (1963)	Peak position
US Billboard Top LPs (Monoraul)	128
