= Carlotta Dale =

American singer (c. 1916 - 1988)

Carlotta Dale (born Carlotta Coverdale; c. 1916 - December 1, 1988) was an American singer who primarily performed with big bands. She was also known as Angela S. Lessy. Jazz writer George T. Simon described Dale as "one of the few girl singers I ever heard who could sound dramatic without resorting to melodramatics."

== Career ==
Dale began singing on radio as Carlotta Coverdale, performing on WLIT and having a weekly program on WDAS, both in Philadelphia. In the mid-1930s, Dale was a singer on the staff of radio station WCAU in Philadelphia, Pennsylvania. She met conductor Jan Savitt when he was hired to lead the station's orchestra. Both of them moved to KYW, another Philadelphia station, where Savitt led KYW's Top Hatters dance band and Dale sang with the group. On February 9, 1939, the group began performing in the Blue Room at the Hotel Lincoln in New York City. Approximately a year later, Dale left Savitt's group to sing with the Will Bradley Orchestra. Her work with Bradley included singing on his 1940 radio program on NBC. In the 1930s, Dale also appeared frequently in shows in night clubs and cafes, and in 1935 she debuted on CBS with her own program as the vocalist with the two-piano team of Mann and Irwin.

Dale's career was nearly ended on June 25, 1936, when she fell from a car driven by Savitt on West Chester Pike in Newtown Square, Pennsylvania. The fall resulted in a compound skull fracture. While she was recovering in a hospital in Philadelphia, an arrangement was made for her to sing on radio from her bed, accompanied by Savitt's orchestra as it flew over the city in an airplane. The musicians could not hear her, but she wore earphones to hear their music transmitted via shortwave radio. The broadcast on NBC Red occurred on April 28, 1937. She returned to work at KYW in August 1937.

In 1937 Dale began the program Songs by Carlotta, which originated at KYW and was carried on NBC Red. In 1938, she had two programs originating at KYW radio and carried on NBC Red; she starred on Melody in Rhythm and co-starred with Bon Bon (George Tunnell) on Music for Moderns. Dale sang on radio station WIP in Philadelphia in 1942. Her program was one of eight shows originating at WIP that were carried on Mutual at that time. Choruses by Carlotta was a 15-minute sustaining program.

== Personal life ==
In June 1934 Dale married fellow WCAU employee Don Pierson (or Pearson), whose real name was Pearson Lessy. They separated 11 months later and were divorced on January 7, 1938. She married Edwin G. Dellheim on April 27, 1942, in Jenkintown, Pennsylvania, and retired from performing. They remained married until her death.

== Critical response ==
A review in the trade publication Billboard said of Dale's Choruses by Carlotta program, "Her song styling has no bounds, being equally proficient for ballads and rhythm tunes, show songs and standards." However, the review said that the program's musical support was less than Dale's voice deserved and that her "corny patter" with the announcer did not belong in the show.
