= Montreux '75 =

Live album by Ella Fitzgerald
- Released: 1975
- Recorded: 17 July 1975
- Genre: Jazz
- Length: 41:35
- Label: Pablo
- Producer: Norman Granz

Ella Fitzgerald chronology
| Ella and Oscar (1975) | Montreux '75 (1975) | Fitzgerald and Pass...Again! (1976) |

Professional ratings
Review scores
| Source | Rating |
|---|---|
| AllMusic | 4/5 stars |
| The Penguin Guide to Jazz Recordings | 3/4 stars |

Montreux '75 is a 1975 live album by the American jazz singer Ella Fitzgerald, accompanied by a trio led by the pianist Tommy Flanagan.

It is one of four albums that Ella recorded at the Montreux Jazz Festival, and it was Ella's first appearance at Montreux to be released on record. It includes familiar Fitzgerald material from Cole Porter, Duke Ellington, and songs from her upcoming album Ella Abraça Jobim.

== Track listing ==
1. "Caravan" (Duke Ellington, Irving Mills, Juan Tizol) – 2:20
2. "Satin Doll" (Ellington, Johnny Mercer, Billy Strayhorn) – 2:37
3. "Teach Me Tonight" (Sammy Cahn, Gene DePaul) – 4:27
4. "Wave" (Antônio Carlos Jobim) – 5:02
5. "It's All Right With Me" (Cole Porter) – 2:49
6. "Let's Do It, Let's Fall in Love" (Porter) – 5:29
7. "How High the Moon" (Nancy Hamilton, Morgan Lewis) – 6:20
8. "The Girl from Ipanema" (Vinícius de Moraes, Norman Gimbel, Jobim) – 6:49
9. "'Tain't Nobody's Bizness If I Do" (Porter Grainger, Everett Robbins) – 5:42

== Personnel ==
Recorded July 17, 1975, in Montreux, Switzerland:

- Ella Fitzgerald - Vocals
- Tommy Flanagan Trio:
  - Tommy Flanagan - Piano
  - Keter Betts - Bass
  - Bobby Durham - Drums
