= Cool Velvet =

Studio album by Stan Getz
- Released: Mid November 1960
- Recorded: March 1960; Baden-Baden, West Germany
- Genre: Jazz
- Label: Verve; MGV 8379
- Producer: Creed Taylor

Stan Getz chronology
Stan Getz at Large (1960)	Cool Velvet (1960)	Focus (1961)

Cool Velvet is a studio album by American saxophonist Stan Getz, recorded and released in 1960 on Verve Records.

Professional ratings
Review scores
Source	Rating
AllMusic	4/5 stars
DownBeat	3/5 stars

== Track listing ==
1. "The Thrill Is Gone" (Brown, Henderson) – 5:03
2. "It Never Entered My Mind" (Hart, Rodgers) – 4:06
3. "Early Autumn" (Burns, Herman, Mercer) – 4:45
4. "When I Go, I Go All the Way" (Garcia) – 4:00
5. "A New Town Is a Blue Town" (Adler, Ross) – 2:42
6. "'Round Midnight" (Hanighen, Monk, Williams) – 3:07
7. "Born to Be Blue" (Torme, Wells) – 3:53
8. "Whisper Not" (Golson) – 5:04
9. "Goodbye" (Jenkins) – 4:24
10. "Nature Boy (Ahbez) – 3:02

== Personnel ==
- Stan Getz - tenor saxophone
- Russell Garcia - arranger and conductor
- Blanchie Birdsong - harp
- Dave Hildinger - vibes
- Jan Johansson - piano
- Freddy Dutton - bass
- Sperie Karas - drums
- Unidentified strings
