= Byrd in the Wind =

Studio album by Charlie Byrd
- Released: 1959
- Recorded: 1959; Washington, D.C.
- Genre: Jazz
- Length: 37:47
- Label: Offbeat; OLP 3005; Riverside; RLP 449

Charlie Byrd chronology
Byrd's Word! (1958)	Byrd in the Wind (1959)	Mr. Guitar (1960)

Byrd in the Wind is an album by American jazz guitarist Charlie Byrd featuring tracks recorded in 1959 and released on the Riverside label in 1963. The album was first released on the Washington Records Offbeat imprint as Byrd in the Wind: Jazz at the Showboat, Vol. II'

== Reception ==
Professional ratings
Review scores
Source	Rating
Allmusic	3/5 stars

Alex Henderson, in his review for Allmusic, states "Byrd in the Wind... isn't among the guitarist's essential albums, but it's still a decent and pleasing document of his pre-bossa nova, pre-'60s period".

== Track listing ==
All compositions by Charlie Byrd except as indicated

1. "Swing 59" - 3:22
2. "You'd Be So Nice to Come Home To" (Cole Porter) - 2:50
3. "Showboat Shuffle" (Duke Ellington) - 3:57
4. "Love Letters" (Edward Heyman, Victor Young) - 3:00
5. "Cross Your Heart" (Buddy DeSylva, Lewis Gensler) - 2:17
6. "Keter's Dirty Blues" (Byrd, Keter Betts) - 4:11
7. "You're a Sweetheart" (Harold Adamson, Jimmy McHugh) - 2:31
8. "Stars Fell on Alabama" (Mitchell Parish, Frank Perkins) - 3:15
9. "You Came a Long Way From St. Louis" (John Benson Brooks, Bob Russell) - 3:30
10. "Wait Till You See Her" (Lorenz Hart, Richard Rodgers) - 2:53
11. "Georgia on My Mind" (Hoagy Carmichael, Stuart Gorrell) - 3:08
12. "Copacabana" (João de Barro, Alberto Ribeiro) - 2:53

== Personnel ==
- Charlie Byrd – guitar
- Buck Hill – tenor saxophone
- Wallace Mann – flute
- Richard White – oboe
- Kenneth Pasmanick – bassoon
- Charlie Schneer – piano
- Keter Betts – double bass
- Bertell Knox – drums
- Ginny Byrd – vocals
