= William Schiøpffe =

Danish jazz musician

- Born: February 6, 1926; Bangkok
- Died: January 2, 1981 (aged 54); Copenhagen
- Other name: often transcribed as William Schiopffe
- Occupation: Jazz drummer
- Years active: 1947–1981

William Schiøpffe (often transcribed as William Schiopffe; 6 February 1926 in Bangkok – 2 January 1981 in Copenhagen), was a Danish jazz drummer,

He began playing professionally in 1947. During his career he performed with Jørgen Ryg, Arne Domnérus, Bengt Hallberg, Lars Gullin, Max Brüel, Stan Getz (on Stan Getz at Large - 1960, In Sweden 1958-60), Bud Powell, Ella Fitzgerald amongst others.
