= William Frank Reichenbach Sr. =

American musician (1923–2008)

Bill Reichenbach Sr.
- Born: William Frank Reichenbach Sr. December 18, 1923; Washington, D.C., U.S.
- Died: May 16, 2008 (aged 84) Los Angeles, California, U.S.
- Genres: Jazz
- Occupation: Musician
- Instruments: Drums, percussion

William Frank Reichenbach Sr. (December 18, 1923 – May 16, 2008) was an American jazz drummer and percussionist, who co-developed the jazz-samba drumming style. He was the father of trombonist Bill Reichenbach Jr. and the singer Kurt Reichenbach.

== Life and career ==
Reichenbach started his musical career even before he graduated from the McKinley Tech High School. During World War II, he played in a band of the Navy before he toured with the big bands of Tommy Dorsey, Jimmy Dorsey, and Art Mooney. Later he worked in the jazz clubs of his hometown, where he accompanied Frank Sinatra, Patti Page, Teddy Wilson, and Zoot Sims.

Charlie Byrd hired Reichenbach as an additional drummer for the Stan Getz album Jazz Samba, which was recorded in 1962 and which provoked a wave of enthusiasm for Bossa Nova in the United States. In the course of 1962, he replaced Buddy Deppenschmidt in the trio of Byrd, of which he was a member for twelve years. Then he returned to work in Washington D.C., as the house drummer at the Blues Alley.

Reichenbach died following a series of strokes in Los Angeles, California, at the age of 84.

== Discography ==
With Charlie Byrd

- Bossa Nova Pelos Passaros (Riverside, 1962)
- Jazz Samba (Verve, 1962)
- Byrd at the Gate (Riverside, 1963)
- Once More! Charlie Byrd's Bossa Nova (Riverside, 1963)
- Byrd Song (Riverside, 1964)
- Latin Impressions (Riverside, 1965)
- Byrdland (Columbia, 1966)
- Brazilian Byrd (Riverside, 1969)
- Byrd Man with Strings (Riverside, 1969)
- Let Go (Columbia, 1969)
- The Stroke of Genius (Columbia, 1971)
- For All We Know (Columbia, 1971)
- Crystal Silence (Fantasy, 1973)
- Latin Byrd (Milestone, 1973)
- In Greenwich Village (Milestone, 1978)
