= Tommy Gwaltney =

American jazz musician

Thomas Oliver Gwaltney III (February 28, 1921, in Norfolk, Virginia, United States – February 11, 2003, in Virginia Beach, Virginia) was an American jazz multi-instrumentalist and bandleader. He played clarinet, saxophone, and vibraphone.

== Biography ==
Gwaltney studied under Ernie Caceres and Peanuts Hucko, playing clarinet in college bands and while serving in the military. Due to lung injuries during World War II, he put down the clarinet and played vibraphone in the 1940s. From 1946 to 1947, he studied at New York University and played in an ensemble with Charlie Byrd and Sol Yaged. Between 1951 and 1955 he seldom played, concentrating on helping a family business in Norfolk, Virginia. In 1956, he joined Bobby Hackett, playing on his album Gotham Jazz Scene in 1957. He then worked with Wild Bill Davison, Billy Butterfield (1958–59), Buck Clayton (1960), Charlie Byrd again (1962–63), and with his own ensembles.

In 1965, Gwaltney established the nightclub Blues Alley in Washington, D.C. After selling it in 1969, he still performed there regularly with guitarist Steve Jordan. He organized the Virginia Beach Jazz Festival and the Manassas Jazz Festival; he led bands at Manassas with Davison, Ed Polcer, Willie "The Lion" Smith, Eddie Condon, Doc Evans, Bobby Hackett, Vic Dickenson, Maxine Sullivan, and Jimmy McPartland.

He stopped playing vibraphone in the 1970s but continued on clarinet in the 1980s and 1990s. In 1986 he recorded a tribute album for Pee Wee Russell and gave a concert at the Smithsonian Institution honoring Jimmie Noone. He worked in the Chesapeake Bay Jazz Band beginning in 1992.

== Awards ==
- Best Reissue Album, Satchmo at the National Press Club: Red Beans and Rice-ly Yours, Independent Music Awards, 2013

== Discography ==
=== As leader ===
- 1960 Goin' to Kansas City with Buck Clayton (Riverside)
- 1963 Great Jazz (Laurel)
- 1982 Singin' the Blues

=== As sideman ===
With Charlie Byrd

- 1963 Once More! Charlie Byrd's Bossa Nova (Riverside)
- 1963 Bossa Nova Pelos Passaros

With Wild Bill Davison

- 1966 Wild Bill at Bull Run
- 1971 Lady of the evening
- 1972 'S Wonderful
- 1973 Just a Gig
- 1986 Lady of the Evening

With others

- 1957 Gotham Jazz Scene, Bobby Hackett (Capitol)
- 1961 Wild Women Don't Have the Blues, Nancy Harrow (Candid)
- 1968 Jazz as It Should Be Played, Eddie Condon
- 1975 Manassas Memories '73, Doc Evans
- 1976 Two for Tea, Max Kaminsky
- 2008 Wille "The Lion Smith" and His Jazz Cubs, Willie "The Lion" Smith (Jazzology)
- 2012 Satchmo at the National Press Club: Red Beans & Rice-Ly Yours, Louis Armstrong (Smithsonian Folkways)

== Other sources ==
- Barry Kernfeld, "Tommy Gwaltney". Grove Jazz online.
