= Byrd Song =

Studio album by Charlie Byrd
- Released: 1964
- Recorded: 1964; New York City
- Genre: Jazz
- Length: 36:12
- Label: Riverside; RLP 481

Charlie Byrd chronology
Byrd at the Gate (1962)	Byrd Song (1964)	Solo Flight (1964)

Byrd Song (subtitled Charlie Byrd with Voices) is an album by American jazz guitarist Charlie Byrd featuring tracks recorded in 1964 and released on the Riverside label.

== Reception ==
Professional ratings
Review scores
Source	Rating
Allmusic	3/5 stars

Allmusic awarded the album 3 stars stating "the vocal component of the record feel[s] like an afterthought. And not an especially inspired one, either; the white-bread soothing choruses sound like refugees from straight easy listening records. The album's actually for the most part a typical, if low-key, Byrd session... When played just by the trio, it's fine, with sterling Byrd guitar, though the less sappy and more forceful material (like "Wildcat") overshadows the more conventional romantic standards. When those voices enter, though, it treads on the annoyingly saccharine.

== Track listing ==
All compositions by Charlie Byrd except as indicated

1. "I Left My Heart in San Francisco" (George Cory, Douglass Cross) – 3:32
2. "Who Will Buy?" (Lionel Bart) – 3:16
3. "The Night We Called It a Day" (Tom Adair, Matt Dennis) – 2:23
4. "Wildcat" (Cy Coleman, Carolyn Leigh) – 2:30
5. "Felicidade" (Antônio Carlos Jobim) – 2:42
6. "Action Painting" – 3:06
7. "This Can't Be Love" (Lorenz Hart, Richard Rodgers) – 2:38
8. "Let's Do It (Let's Fall in Love)" (Cole Porter) – 3:26
9. "God Bless the Child" (Billie Holiday, Arthur Herzog, Jr.) – 2:47
10. "My Favorite Things" (Oscar Hammerstein II, Richard Rodgers) – 4:15
11. "Swing '59" – 3:21
12. "Born to Be Blue" (Mel Tormé, Robert Wells) – 2:16

== Personnel ==
- Charlie Byrd – guitar
- Keter Betts – bass
- Bill Reichenbach – drums
- Unidentified chorus – vocals
