= Will Bradley =

American trombonist and bandleader (1912–1989)

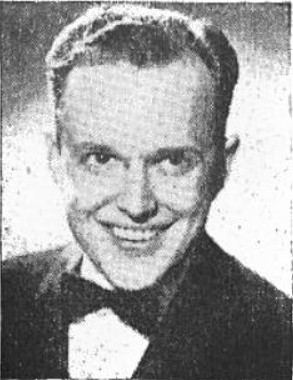
- Will Bradley in a 1942 advertisement

Background information
- Born: Wilbur Schwichtenberg; July 12, 1912; Newton, New Jersey, U.S.
- Died: July 15, 1989 (aged 77) Flemington, New Jersey, U.S.
- Genres: Big band, boogie-woogie
- Occupation: Musician
- Instrument: Trombone

Wilbur Schwichtenberg (July 12, 1912 – July 15, 1989), known professionally as Will Bradley, was an American trombonist and bandleader during the 1930s and 1940s. He performed swing, dance music, and boogie-woogie songs, many of them written or co-written by Don Raye.

== Career ==
Born in Newton, New Jersey, Wilbur Schwichtenberg was raised in Washington, New Jersey. In 1928, he moved to New York City and became a member of bands such as Red Nichols & His Five Pennies. During the 1930s, except for one year with the Ray Noble orchestra, he was studio musician for CBS Radio, and was the resident hot trombonist on the network's popular jam session The Saturday Night Swing Club. He also led the studio band for the Summer Silver Theater on CBS in 1941, with Ed Sullivan as the show's host.

In 1939, he changed his name from Wilbur Schwichtenberg to Will Bradley, and started a big band with Ray McKinley, a swing drummer and vocalist from Texas. The band included Freddie Slack (piano), Arthur Rollini (saxophone), Peanuts Hucko (clarinet), and Pete Candoli (trumpet). Vocalists included Terry Allen, Carlotta Dale, Lynn Gardner, Steve Jordan, Ray McKinley, Phyllis Myles, Larry Southern, and Jimmy Valentine.

The Bradley band became well known for boogie-woogie, particularly with its hit record, "Beat Me Daddy, Eight to the Bar". The song reached the top ten of Billboard magazine's popular music chart, as did "Scrub Me Mama with a Boogie Beat" and "Down the Road a Piece". The latter song was recorded by the Will Bradley Trio (McKinley on drums, Slack on piano, and Doc Goldberg on bass), with the vocal by songwriter Don Raye.

James Roosevelt introduced a new concept in filmed entertainment: three-minute musical Soundies filmed for coin-operated "movie jukeboxes." Will Bradley was one of the first bandleaders to work in Soundies (in December 1940; the others were Vincent Lopez and Ray Kinney).

In 1942, McKinley departed the Bradley outfit to form his own band, and Slack followed suit that same year. Bradley hired trumpeter Shorty Rogers and drummer Shelly Manne, but many members were drafted into the armed forces. Bradley dissolved his big band and returned to broadcasting. He remained in demand as a recording-studio musician; in the mid-forties he recorded as "Will Bradley and His Boogie Woogie Boys," and he filmed more Soundies in 1944, leading a nine-piece combo. He played trombone for Jimmy Dorsey's hit record "So Rare". In December 1954 he signed with NBC Radio's flagship station in New York, WRCA, joining many veterans of the big-band era to provide live music on the air. He continued to work in radio and television, including music for commercials.

In 1956, Will Bradley's former drummer Ray McKinley -- who had assumed leadership of the Miller band in 1945 -- formed a new Glenn Miller Orchestra at the request of Glenn Miller's widow Helen. McKinley recruited Bradley as featured trombonist. They remained with the Miller band until 1966, when Helen Miller died.

== Death ==
Will Bradley died on July 15, 1989, in Flemington, New Jersey, three days after his 77th birthday.

== Discography ==
- Boogie-Woogie (Epic, 1954)
- Jazz Encounter (Waldorf Music Hall, 1955)
- Jazz – Dixieland and Chicago Style (Waldorf Music Hall, 1955)
- 1941 (Circle, 1986)

With Ray McKinley

- Will Bradley & Ray McKinley, (Columbia 123, 1947, No. 2 US)

With Charlie Parker

- Big Band (Clef, 1954)

With Nelson Riddle

- Phil Silvers and Swinging Brass (Columbia, 1957)

With Ruth Brown

- Ruth Brown (Atlantic, 1957)

Chart singles

- What Can I Say After I Say I'm Sorry? (1940)
- Beat Me, Daddy, Eight to the Bar (vocal by Ray McKinley) (1940)
- Scrub Me, Mama, with a Boogie Beat (vocal by Ray McKinley) (1940)
- There I Go (vocal by Jimmy Valentine) (1940)
- Down the Road a Piece (vocals by Ray McKinley & Will Bradley) (1940)
- Celery Stalks at Midnight (1940)
- High on a Windy Hill (vocal by Jimmy Valentine) (1941)
- Cryin' the Boogie Blues (1944)
