= Keter Betts =

American jazz double bassist (1928–2005)

Background information
- Born: William Thomas Betts; July 22, 1928; Port Chester, New York
- Died: August 6, 2005 (aged 77) Silver Spring, Maryland
- Genres: Jazz
- Occupation: Musician
- Instrument: Bass

William Thomas "Keter" Betts (July 22, 1928 – August 6, 2005) was an American jazz double bassist.

== Early life and education ==
Born in Port Chester, New York, he was nicknamed "Keter", a short form of the word mosquito. He graduated from Port Chester High School in 1946, where he played drums, tympani, tuba, glockenspiel, and bass fiddle.

== Career ==
Many better-known musicians, such as Dinah Washington, Ella Fitzgerald, Oscar Peterson, Nat Adderley, Stan Getz, Charlie Byrd and others, recognizing Betts's talent, invited him to perform with them professionally. He was a member of Earl Bostic's R&B band from April 1949 to August 1951. Accompanied Dinah Washington/December 1951 to October 1956. He later became a member of the Charlie Byrd Trio in 1957. In 1962, he was instrumental in introducing the bossa nova style to American audiences via their Jazz Samba recording. He worked with Bobby Timmons and recorded an album in 1964 before joining Ella Fitzgerald as an accompanist in October of that year. He toured with Fitzgerald as a bassist for many years after. He left Fitzgerald's band and worked with Roberta Flack, Joe Williams, Johnny Hartman, Kenny Burrell, Herbie Mann, Billy Eckstine, and Chris Connor. He rejoined Fitzgerald in December 1971 and remained with her until her retirement.

== Personal life ==
A widowed father of five children, Betts resided in the Washington, D.C., area for more than a half century. He died of a heart attack at his home in Silver Spring, Maryland, in August 2005.

== Selected discography ==
As Leader

- Bass, Buddies & Blues (Keter Betts Music, 1998)
- Bass, Buddies, Blues & Beauty Too (Keter Betts Music, 1999)
- Live at the East Coast Jazz Festival (Keter Betts Music, 2000)

With Clifford Brown

- Jam Session (EmArcy, 1954) with Maynard Ferguson and Clark Terry

With Charlie Byrd

- Blues for Night People (1957)
- Byrd's Word! (Riverside, 1958)
- Byrd in the Wind (Riverside, 1959)
- Mr. Guitar (Riverside, 1960)
- The Guitar Artistry of Charlie Byrd (Riverside, 1960)
- Charlie Byrd at the Village Vanguard (Riverside, 1961)
- Blues Sonata (Riverside, 1961)
- Jazz Samba (Verve, 1962) with Stan Getz
- Latin Impressions (Riverside, 1962)
- Bossa Nova Pelos Passaros (Riverside, 1962)
- Once More! Charlie Byrd's Bossa Nova (Riverside, 1963)
- Byrd at the Gate (Riverside, 1963)
- Byrd Song (Riverside, 1964)

With Ella Fitzgerald

- Ella in Hamburg (Verve, live, 1965)
- Ella Loves Cole (Atlantic, 1972)
- Ella in London (Pablo, live, 1974)
- Montreux '75 (Pablo, live, 1975)
- Montreux '77 (Ella Fitzgerald album) (Pablo, live, 1977)
- Digital III at Montreux (Pablo, live, 1979)
- A Perfect Match (Ella Fitzgerald album) (Pablo, 1979)
- Jazz at the Philharmonic – Yoyogi National Stadium, Tokyo 1983: Return to Happiness (Pablo, live, 1983)

With Tommy Flanagan

- The Tommy Flanagan Tokyo Recital (Pablo, 1975)
- Straight Ahead (Pablo, 1976) with Eddie "Lockjaw" Davis
- Something Borrowed, Something Blue (Galaxy, 1978)

With Etta Jones

- The Melody Lingers On (HighNote, 1997)

With Sam Jones

- The Soul Society (Riverside, 1960)
- The Chant (Riverside, 1961)

With Junior Mance

- Blue Mance (Chiaroscuro, 1994)
- The Floating Jazz Festival Trio (Chiaroscuro, 1995)
- The FJF Trio with Joe Temperley (Chiaroscuro, 1996)
- The Floating Jazz Festival Trio (Chiaroscuro, 1997)
- The Floating Jazz Festival Trio (Chiaroscuro, 1998)
- A Chiaroscuro Christmas (Chiaroscuro)

With Helen Merrill

- The Artistry of Helen Merrill (Mainstream, 1965)

With Bobby Timmons

- Chun-King (Prestige, 1964)
- Workin' Out! (Prestige, 1964)

With Louie Bellson

- Salute (Chiaroscuro, 1994)

With Johnny Frigo, Herb Ellis and Lou Carter

- The Soft Winds, Then and Now (Chiaroscuro, 1996)

With Jay McShann

- Hootie (Chiaroscuro, 1997)

With Red Holloway, O. C. Smith and Phil Upchurch

- Standing Room Only (Chiaroscuro, 1998)

With Waymon Reed

- 46th and 8th (Artists House, 1977 [1979])

With C. I. Williams

- When Alto Was King (Mapleshade, 1997)
- Straight From The Source, with Pete Minger, Bobby Durham and Dolph Castellano (Spinnster Records, 1984)
