= Marky Markowitz =

American jazz trumpeter (1923–1986)

Irvin "Marky" Markowitz (December 11, 1923 – November 18, 1986), also known as Irwin Markowitz or Irving Markowitz, was an American jazz trumpeter.

Born the youngest of seven children of Russian-Jewish immigrants who disembarked in Baltimore, and settled on 4 1/2 Street, Southwest, in Washington, D.C., Markowitz learned the trumpet at the local Police Boys' Club. He played early in his career in a number of big bands, including those of Charlie Spivak (1941–42), Jimmy Dorsey, Boyd Raeburn, and Woody Herman (1946). He played in Buddy Rich's orchestra in 1946–47, then returned to service under Herman in 1947–48. Moving his family from Washington, D.C. to New York in 1958, and eventually settling in Nyack, he worked primarily as a studio musician in the 1960s, 1970s, and 1980s. Some live appearances included work with Herman, Gene Krupa (1958), Lee Konitz (1959), Ralph Burns, George Russell, Al Cohn (1962), Paul Desmond (1969), and Bill Evans (1974). Marky was a "first call" trumpeter for many top artists of the 1960s, 1970s, and 1980s, including Paul Simon, Aretha Franklin, Stevie Wonder, the Young Rascals, Frank Sinatra, Tony Bennett, Dionne Warwick, Maynard Ferguson, George Segal, and many others, as well as hundreds of advertising "jingles", TV ads and movie scores. He was a perennial on the Jerry Lewis Labor Day Telethon for Muscular Dystrophy, and known for a "sweet" tone on the trumpet and flugelhorn, as well as a better-than-average vocal impression of Louis "Satchmo" Armstrong, which was featured on a 1970s TV commercial for Hecker's Flour. In January 1985, just the year before his death at age 62, Marky returned to his hometown of Washington, D.C. to perform with an All-Star band, led by famed composer/arranger Nelson Riddle, at the Inaugural Ball for President Ronald Reagan's 2nd term. He led only one recording session, for Harry Lim's Famous Door label in 1976.

Marky Markowitz, Tony Bennett, Torrie Zito at taping of "Play It Again, Sam", NYC 1969

Marky Markowitz with Joel Grey, backstage Palace Theatre NYC 1975, set of "Goodtime Charley"

== Discography ==
With David Amram

- Subway Night (RCA, 1973)

With Burt Bacharach/Dionne Warwick

- Walk On By (1964)

With Richard Barbary

- Soul Machine (A&M, 1968)

With Gato Barbieri

- Caliente (A&M, 1976)

With Louie Bellson

- Breakthrough! (Project 3, 1968)

With Tony Bennett

- Fool of Fools (45 rpm, CBS, 1968)
- Play it Again, Sam (45 rpm, CBS, 1969)
- What The World Needs Now Is Love (45 rpm, CBS, 1969)
- You Can't Love 'Em All (Columbia, 1959)
- Ask Anyone In Love (Columbia, 1959)
- Yesterday I Heard the Rain (Columbia, 1968)
- I've Gotta Be Me (Columbia, 1969)
- Summer of '42 (Columbia, 1972)

With Sonny Berman

- Early Bebop Pioneer (Gramercy, 1948)

With Brasilia Nueva

- How Insensitive (Decca, 1967)

With Bob Brookmeyer

- Portrait of the Artist (Atlantic, 1960)

With Solomon Burke

- The Best of Solomon Burke (Atlantic, 1964)

With Ralph Burns

- Where There's Burns, There's Fire (Warwick, 1961)

With Paul Butterfield

- Put It In Your Ear (Bearsville, 1976)

With Emmett Carls / Lennie Tristano

- The Lost Session (Jazz Guild, rec. 1945, rel. 1976)

With Barbara Carroll

- From The Beginning (United Artists, 1977)

With Chris Connor

- Free Spirits (Atlantic, 1962)

With King Curtis

- Jazz Super Hits, Vol. 2 "Philly Dog" (Atlantic, 1966)

With Paul Desmond

- From the Hot Afternoon (A&M/CTI, 1969)

With Neil Diamond

- In My Lifetime (Rel. 1996, Columbia)

With Bo Diddley

- Big Bad Bo (Chess, 1974)

With Duke Ellington

- Best Of the War Years (Rel. 1993)

With Bill Evans

- Symbiosis (MPS, 1974)
- The Ivory Hunters (United Artists, 1959)

With Maynard Ferguson

- Conquistador (Columbia, 1977)

With Astrud Gilberto

- I Haven't Got Anything Better to Do (Verve, 1969)
- That Girl From Ipanema (Image, 1977)

With Dizzy Gillespie

- One Night in Washington (Elektra/Musician, 1955 [1983])

With Grant Green

- Afro Party (Blue Note, 1971)

With Bobby Hebb

- Sunny (Philips, 1966)

With Woody Herman

- Twelve Shades of Blue (Columbia, 1947)
- "Woodchoppers" (Mosaic, 1947)
- The Thundering Herds (Columbia, 1947)
- Blowin' Up a Storm (Columbia, 1947)
- The Fourth Herd (Riverside/Jazzland, 1959)
- First Herd at Carnegie Hall (Verve, 1946)

With Tommy James and the Shondells

- I Think We're Alone Now (1967)

With Tamiko Jones

- I'll Be Anything for You (A&M, 1968)

With Ben E. King

- Seven Letters (Atco, 1964)

With Lee Konitz

- You and Lee (Verve, 1959)

With Gene Krupa

- Gerry Mulligan Arrangements (Verve, 1958)

With The Manhattan Transfer

- The Best of the Manhattan Transfer (1981)
- Pastiche (Atlantic, 1978)

With Herbie Mann

- My Kinda Groove (Atlantic, 1964)
- Our Mann Flute (Columbia, 1964)
- The Best of Herbie Mann (Atlantic, 1966)

With Jackie McLean

- Monuments (RCA, 1979)

With Carmen McRae

- Birds of a Feather (Decca, 1958)

With Butch Miles

- Miles and Miles of Swing (Famous Door, 1977)

With Blue Mitchell

- Many Shades of Blue (Mainstream, 1974)

With Hugo Montenegro

- Cha Chas for Dancing (1966)

With James Moody

- Moody with Strings (Argo, 1961)

With Claus Ogerman Orchestra

- Bill Evans Trio with Claus Ogerman Orchestra (MPS, 1974)

With Felix Pappalardi

- Don't Worry, Ma (A&M, 1979)

With Bill Potts

- Bye Bye Birdie (Colpix, 1963)
- The Jazz Soul of Porgy and Bess (United Artists, 1959)
- How Insensitive (Decca, 1967)

With Tito Puente

- Herman's Heat and Puente's Beat (Palladium, 1958)

With Buddy Rich

- Both Sides (Mercury, 1976)
- The Rich Rebellion (Mercury, 1960)
- The Driver (EmArcy, 1960)

With Lalo Schifrin

- New Fantasy (Verve, 1964)

With George Segal

- The Yama Yama Man (Philips, 1967)

With Bobby Short

- No Strings (Atlantic, 1962)

With Paul Simon

- One Trick Pony (Warner Bros, 1980)
- The Essential Paul Simon (Sony, Rel. 2010)

With Zoot Sims

- The Aztec Suite (United Artists, 1959)

With Jimmy Smith

- The Cat (Verve, 1964)

With Howard Tate

- Howard Tate (Atlantic, 1971)

With Joe Thomas

- Masada (Groove Merchant, 1975)

With Joe Timer and Charles Mingus

- Tiny's Blues (Mythic, 1953)

With Leslie Uggams

- My Own Morning (Atlantic, 1967)

With Frankie Valli

- Can't Take My Eyes Off Of You (1967)

With Loudon Wainwright III

- T Shirt (Arista, 1976)

With Grover Washington Jr.

- All the King's Horses (Kudu, 1972)

With Kai Winding

- The In Instrumentals (Verve, 1965)

== Film credits ==
- All That Jazz (1979)
- Badge 373 (1973)
- Bananas (1971)
- Being There (1979)
- The Boys in the Band (1970)
- The Cotton Club (1984)
- The Fan (1981)
- Foul Play (1978)
- Four Jills in a Jeep (1944)
- Frosty's Winter Wonderland (1979)
- Good Morning, Vietnam (1987)
- Hair (1979)
- The Heartbreak Kid (1972)
- Lenny (1974)
- The Lords of Flatbush (1974)
- Made for Each Other (1971)
- National Lampoon's Movie Madness (1983)
- Pennies From Heaven (1981)
- Pin Up Girl (1944)
- Prime Suspect /aka/ Cry of Innocence (1982)
- Stagecoach (1966)
- Take the Money and Run (1969)

== Television ==
- ABC World News Tonight theme
- The Price Is Right theme (CBS)
- 20/20 theme (ABC)
