= Earl Swope =

American jazz musician

Earl Bowman Swope (August 4, 1922 – January 3, 1968) was an American jazz trombonist.

== Early life ==
Swope was born in Hagerstown, Maryland, on August 4, 1922. His family was musical: his parents, a sister and two brothers were all musicians. One of his brothers was Rob Swope.

== Later life and career ==
When he was 20, Swope played with Sonny Dunham; he was then with Boyd Raeburn (1943–44), Georgie Auld (1945), and Buddy Rich (1945–47). From 1947 to 1949 he worked with Woody Herman and also recorded in small groups with Stan Getz and Serge Chaloff. In 1950–51 he was with Elliot Lawrence, then worked freelance in New York and Washington, D.C. Later in the 1950s he returned to big band work, playing with Jimmy Dorsey (1957) and Louie Bellson (1959). In the 1960s he played locally in Washington, D.C.; he died there on January 3, 1968.

== Playing style ==
"He was one of the few trombonists in the 1940s to develop a style that was not influenced by J. J. Johnson; he played in a modern barrelhouse style".

== Discography ==
With Louie Bellson

- The Brilliant Bellson Sound (Verve, 1959)

With Charlie Byrd

- Bossa Nova Pelos Passaros (Riverside, 1962)

With Dizzy Gillespie

- One Night in Washington (Elektra/Musician, 1955 [1983])

With Lester Young

- Lester Young In Washington, D.C. 1956, Vol. 5 (Pablo, 1999)
