= Born to Be Blue! (Bobby Timmons album) =

Studio album by Bobby Timmons
- Released: 1963
- Recorded: August 12 and September 10, 1963
- Genre: Jazz
- Length: 41:22
- Label: Riverside
- Producer: Orrin Keepnews

Bobby Timmons chronology
Sweet and Soulful Sounds (1962)	Born to Be Blue! (1963)	From the Bottom (1964)

Born to Be Blue! is an album by American jazz pianist Bobby Timmons recorded in 1963 and released on the Riverside label.

== Reception ==
The Allmusic review by Scott Yanow awarded the album 4 stars stating: "This is excellent music but unfortunately Timmons would not grow much musically after this period".

Professional ratings
Review scores
Source	Rating
Allmusic	4/5 stars
The Penguin Guide to Jazz	3.5/4 stars

== Track listing ==
All compositions by Bobby Timmons except as indicated

1. "Born to Be Blue" (Mel Torme, Robert Wells) - 4:23
2. "Malice Towards None" (Tom McIntosh) - 4:55
3. "Sometimes I Feel Like a Motherless Child" (Traditional) - 4:40
4. "Know Not One" - 7:52
5. "The Sit-In" - 4:15
6. "Namely You" (Gene de Paul, Johnny Mercer) - 6:01
7. "Often Annie" - 9:16
  - Recorded in New York City on August 12, 1963 (tracks 3, 4 & 6) and September 10, 1963 (tracks 1, 2, 5, & 7).

== Personnel ==
- Bobby Timmons - piano
- Ron Carter (tracks 3, 4 & 6), Sam Jones (tracks 1, 2, 5, & 7) - bass
- Connie Kay - drums
