= Rob Swope =

American jazz musician

George Robert "Rob" Swope (December 2, 1926, Washington, D.C. - January 9, 1967, Washington, D.C.) was an American jazz trombonist. He was the brother of Earl Swope.

Swope played with Buddy Rich in 1947 and Chubby Jackson in 1948-49, and also recorded with Jerry Wald in 1947. He worked with Gene Krupa in 1949-50, then with Elliot Lawrence in 1950-51. He led his own trio in the D.C. area in the early 1950s, and also was a member of The Orchestra, the band which accompanied Charlie Parker in 1953 and Dizzy Gillespie in 1955. He spent time in New York City in the latter half of the 1950s, playing with Larry Sonn, Boyd Raeburn, Claude Thornhill, Jimmy Dorsey, and Louie Bellson. In the 1960s he worked in Washington, D.C. again, often as a leader.

== Discography ==
With Dizzy Gillespie

- One Night in Washington (Elektra/Musician, 1955 [1983])
