= Charlie Byrd =

American jazz guitarist (1925–1999)

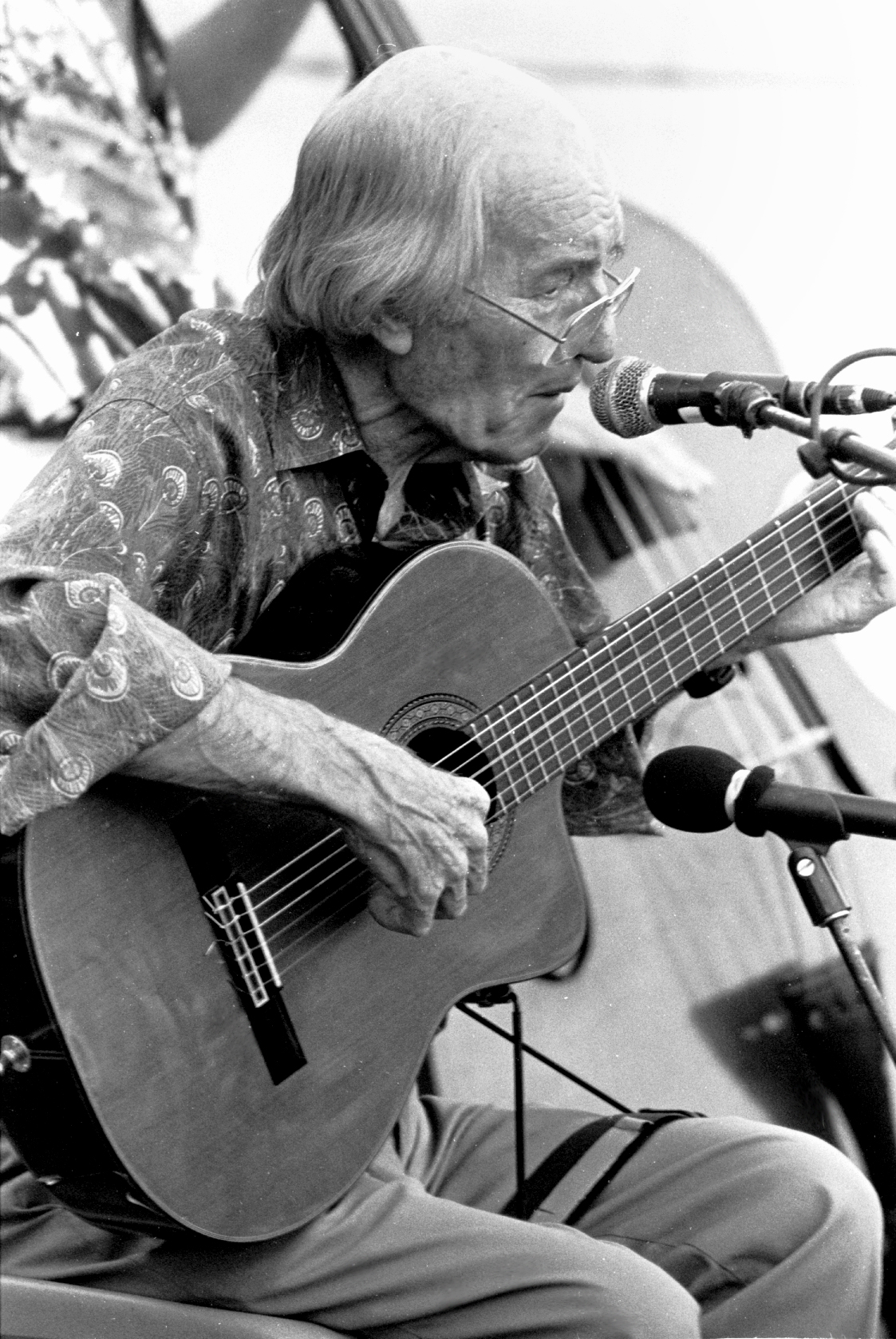
- Charlie Byrd performing with his trio in July 1997

Background information
- Born: Charlie Lee Byrd; September 16, 1925; Suffolk, Virginia, U.S.
- Origin: Washington, D.C., U.S.
- Died: December 2, 1999 (aged 74) Annapolis, Maryland, U.S.
- Genres: Bossa nova, Latin jazz, swing
- Occupation: Musician
- Instrument: Guitar
- Years active: 1957–1999
- Labels: Savoy, Riverside, Columbia, Concord Jazz

Charlie Lee Byrd (September 16, 1925 – December 2, 1999) was an American jazz guitarist who played fingerstyle on a classical guitar. Byrd was best known for his association with Brazilian music, especially bossa nova. In 1962, he collaborated with Stan Getz on the album Jazz Samba, a recording which brought bossa nova into the mainstream of North American music.

== Early life ==
Charlie Byrd was born in 1925 in Suffolk, Virginia, and grew up in the borough of Chuckatuck. His father, a mandolinist and guitarist, taught him how to play the acoustic steel guitar at age 10. Byrd had three brothers, Oscar, Jack, and Gene "Joe" Byrd, who was an upright bass player. In 1942, Byrd entered the Virginia Polytechnic Institute (VPI, now better known as Virginia Tech) and played in the school orchestra. In 1943, he was drafted into the United States Army, saw combat in World War II, and was stationed in Paris in 1945. There he played in an Army Special Services band and toured occupied Europe in the all-soldier production G.I. Carmen.

After the war, Byrd returned to the United States and studied composition and jazz theory at the Harnett National Music School in Manhattan, New York City. During this time, he began playing a classical guitar. His first nylon string classical guitar is believed to be a 1933 Vincente Tatay which he purchased in a NYC music store. (source - Elana Byrd - Sister in-law) After moving to Washington, D.C., in 1950, he studied classical guitar with Sophocles Papas for several years. In 1954, he became a pupil of the Spanish classical guitarist Andrés Segovia and spent time studying with him in Italy.

Byrd's earliest and greatest influence was the gypsy jazz guitarist Django Reinhardt, whom he saw perform in Paris.

== Career ==
In 1957, Byrd met double bassist Keter Betts in a Washington, D.C., club called the Vineyard. The two men began performing gigs together, and by October were frequently performing at a club called the Showboat. In 1959, they joined Woody Herman's band and toured Europe for three weeks as part of a State Department-sponsored goodwill tour. The other members of the band were Vince Guaraldi, Bill Harris, Nat Adderley, and drummer Jimmy Campbell. Byrd led his own groups that sometimes featured his brother Joe. Byrd was also active as a teacher in the late 1950s; he trained guitar students at his home in Washington, D.C., each being required to audition before he agreed to be their teacher.

Byrd was introduced to Brazilian music by Felix Grant, a friend and radio host who had contacts in Brazil in the late 1950s, and who was well-known there by 1960 due to the efforts of Brazilian radio broadcaster Paulo Santos. Following a 1961 diplomatic tour of South America (including Brazil) for the State Department, Byrd returned home and met with Stan Getz at the Showboat Lounge. Byrd invited Getz back to his home to listen to some bossa nova recordings by João Gilberto and Antonio Carlos Jobim which he had brought back. Getz liked what he heard and the two decided that they wanted to make an album of the songs. The task of creating an authentic sound, however, proved much more challenging than either had anticipated.

Getz convinced Creed Taylor at Verve Records to produce the album. Taylor and Byrd assembled a group of musicians they knew. These early sessions did not turn out to either man's liking, so Byrd gathered a group of musicians that had been to Brazil with him previously and practiced with them in Washington, D.C., until he felt they were ready to record. The group included his brother Gene ("Joe") Byrd, as well as Keter Betts, Bill Reichenbach and Buddy Deppenschmidt. Reichenbach and Deppenschmidt were drummers, and the combination made it easier to achieve samba rhythm. Finally the group was deemed ready and Getz and Taylor arrived in Washington, D.C., on February 13, 1962. They recorded in a building adjacent to All Souls Unitarian Church because of the building's excellent acoustics.

Jazz Samba was released in April 1962, and by September it had entered the Billboard pop album chart. By March of the following year the album had moved to number one. The term "bossa nova" was not used until later. The album remained on the charts for seventy weeks, and Getz soon beat John Coltrane in a DownBeat poll. One of the album's most popular tunes was a Jobim hit, titled "Desafinado".

Following the success of Jazz Samba, Byrd signed with Riverside Records, which reissued six of his albums recorded for the small Offbeat label, a subsidiary of Washington Records.

On March 13–16, 1963, Byrd travelled two hours south of Washington, DC to the University of Virginia in Charlottesville to provide music for an original musical, Lament For Guitar and Two Lovers. The play was by Lee Devin of the UVa drama department, with music for 10-piece ensemble by Sidney Hodkinson of the UVa music department. Two nights later on March 18, the Byrd trio played a concert featuring "Lament for Guitar and Two Lovers" at Cabell Hall, the university's acoustic auditorium. The solo dancer for the concert was Jocelyn Anker Moss.

In 1963, Byrd toured Europe with Les McCann and Zoot Sims. Between 1964 and 1965, he appeared at the Newport Jazz Festival with Episcopal priest Malcolm Boyd, accompanying prayers from his book Are You Running With Me Jesus? with guitar. In 1967, Byrd brought a lawsuit against Stan Getz and MGM, contending that he was unfairly paid for his contributions to the 1962 album Jazz Samba. The jury agreed with Byrd and awarded him half the royalties from the album.

In 1973, Byrd moved to Annapolis, Maryland, and in September of that year he recorded an album with Cal Tjader titled Tambú, the only recording the two would make together. That same year, Byrd joined guitarists Herb Ellis and Barney Kessel and formed the Great Guitars group, which also included drummer Johnny Rae. Byrd collaborated with Venezuelan pianist and composer Aldemaro Romero on the album Onda Nueva/The New Wave.

From 1980 through 1996, he released several of his arrangements to the jazz and classical guitar community through Guitarist's Forum (gfmusic.com), including Charlie Byrd's Christmas Guitar Solos, Mozart: Seven Waltzes For Classical Guitar, and The Charlie Byrd Library featuring the music of George Gershwin and Irving Berlin. He also collaborated with the Annapolis Brass Quintet in the late 1980s, appearing with them in over 50 concerts across the United States and releasing two albums.

Byrd played for several years at a jazz club in Silver Spring, Maryland, called The Showboat II which was owned and managed by his manager, Peter Lambros. He was also home-based at the King of France Tavern nightclub at the Maryland Inn in Annapolis from 1973 until his death in 1999. In 1992, the book Jazz Cooks—by Bob Young and Al Stankus—was published by Stewart, Tabori & Chang, a compilation of recipes that include a few recipes from Byrd. He also authored the 1973 publication Charlie Byrd's Melodic Method for Guitar. Currently, a collection of Charlie Byrd's recordings, photographs and other treasures from his life and career are displayed in "The Byrd Room" at The Mainstay music venue in Rock Hall, Md.The Mainstay is also home to the Charlie Byrd Society, an exclusive group of music enthusiasts and supporters. Charlie's 1933 Vincento Tatay guitar now also resides in a private collection in Rock Hall, MD and is often exhibited upon request at The Mainstay. The public is invited to visit The Byrd Room, where Charlie's wife, Becky often tends the bar, and find out more about the life and times of Charlie Byrd.

== Personal life ==
Byrd was married three times. His first wife was singer Virginia "Ginny" Marie Byrd, who performed vocals on a number of his early recordings and who died in 1974. They had two children: Carol M. Rose and Jeffrey. Jeffrey, died in 1973 after a car accident. His second marriage to Maggie Byrd ended in divorce; they had one daughter, Charlotte E. Byrd.

At the time of his death, Byrd had been married to Rebecca Byrd, of Annapolis, for one year. He was survived by his wife, his daughters from his first and second marriage, two brothers: Jack R. Byrd of Suffolk, Va., and Gene H. "Joe" Byrd of Edgewater, and a granddaughter.

A pastime for Byrd was sailboating, as he owned a boat called "I'm Hip".

== Death ==
Byrd died of lung cancer on December 2, 1999, at his home in Annapolis, at the age of 74.

== Awards ==
- 1999 – Knighted by the government of Brazil as a Knight of the Rio Branco
- 1997 – deemed a "Maryland Art Treasure" by the Community Arts Alliance of Maryland

== Discography ==
=== As leader ===
Recorded	Title	Label	Released	Notes
1957	Jazz Recital	Savoy	1957	
1957	Blues for Night People	Savoy	1957	
	Everybody's Doin' the Bossa Nova	Riverside	1960	
1960	Four Suites by Ludovico Roncalli	Washington Records	1960	
1962	Latin Impressions	Riverside	1962	
1962	Jazz Samba	Verve	1962	Co-led with Stan Getz
1960	Mr. Guitar	Riverside	1962	Originally issued as Jazz at the Showboat, Vol. 3 (Offbeat)
1962	Bossa Nova Pelos Passaros	Riverside	1962	
1958	Byrd's Word!	Riverside	1962	Originally issued as Jazz at the Showboat (Offbeat)
1960	The Guitar Artistry of Charlie Byrd	Riverside	1963	Originally issued as Charlie's Choice (Offbeat)
1961	Charlie Byrd at the Village Vanguard	Riverside	1963	Originally issued on Offbeat
1961	Blues Sonata	Riverside	1963	Originally issued on Offbeat
1963	Once More! Charlie Byrd's Bossa Nova	Riverside	1963	
1963	Byrd at the Gate	Riverside	1963	
1959	Byrd in the Wind	Riverside	1963	Originally issued on Offbeat
1964	Byrd Song	Riverside	1964	
1963	Guitar/Guitar	Columbia	1965	Co-led with Herb Ellis
1965	Travellin' Man	Columbia	1965	
1965	Brazilian Byrd	Columbia	1965	
	Byrdland	Columbia	1966	
1965	The Touch of Gold	Columbia	1966	
1966	Christmas Carols for Solo Guitar	Columbia	1966	
1966	The Byrd & the Herd!	Pickwick	1966	Charlie Byrd & Woody Herman
1967	Hollywood Byrd	Columbia	1967	
1965	Solo Flight	Riverside	1967	
1967	More Brazilian Byrd	Columbia	1967	
1967	Sketches of Brazil: The Music of Villa-Lobos	Columbia	1968	
1968	Hit Trip	Columbia	1968	
1968	Delicately	Columbia	1968	
	The Great Byrd	Columbia	1968	
1969	Aquarius	Columbia	1969	Reached No. 197 in the US
1969	Let Go	Columbia	1969	Reached No. 129 in the US
	Let It Be	Columbia	1970	
1971	For All We Know	Columbia	1971	
1971	The Stroke of Genius	Columbia	1971	
	Onda Nueva	Columbia	1972	Co-led with Aldemaro Romero
1973	Crystal Silence	Fantasy	1973	
1973	Tambu	Fantasy	1974	Co-led with Cal Tjader
1974	Byrd by the Sea	Fantasy	1974	
1975	Great Guitars	Concord Jazz	1975	Co-led with Barney Kessel, Herb Ellis
1975	Top Hat	Fantasy	1975	
1976	Charlie Byrd Swings Downtown	Improv	1976	
1976	Great Guitars 2	Concord Jazz	1976	Co-led with Barney Kessel, Herb Ellis
1977	Charlie Byrd	Crystal Clear Records	1977	
1977	Encores At The Maryland Inn	SRI	1977	
1979	Blue Byrd	Concord Jazz	1979	
	Sugarloaf Suite	Concord Jazz	1979	
	Great Guitars at the Winery	Concord Jazz	1980	Co-led with Barney Kessel, Herb Ellis
	Brazilian Soul	Concord Jazz	1981	Co-led with Laurindo Almeida
1981	Brazilville	Concord Jazz	1982	Co-led with Bud Shank
1982	The Charlie Byrd Christmas Album	Concord Jazz	1982	
1983	Latin Odyssey	Concord Jazz	1983	Co-led with Laurindo Almeida
1984	Isn't It Romantic	Concord Jazz	1984	
1985	Tango	Concord	1985	Co-led with Laurindo Almeida
1986	Byrd and Brass	Concord Jazz	1986	Co-led with Annapolis Brass Quintet
1988	It's a Wonderful World		1988	
	Music of the Brazilian Masters	Concord	1989	Co-led with Laurindo Almeida, Carlos Barbosa-Lima
1991	The Bossa Nova Years	Concord	1991	with Ken Peplowski
1992	The Washington Guitar Quintet	Concord Jazz	1992	
1994	Moments Like This	Concord	1994	
1993	Aquarelle	Concord	1994	
1994	I've Got the World on a String	Timeless	1994	
1995	Homage to Jobim	Concord Picante	1995	
1995	Du Hot Club de Concord	Concord Jazz	1995	
1996	The Return of the Great Guitars	Concord Jazz	1996	Co-led with Herb Ellis, Mundell Lowe
1997	Au Courant	Concord Jazz	1998	
1999	My Inspiration	Concord	1999	
2000	For Louis	Concord	2000	

=== As sideman ===
With Woody Herman

- Bamba Samba Bossa Nova (Everest, 1958)
- Woody Herman Sextet at the Roundtable (Forum, inprint of Roulette Records, 1959)

With Buck Clayton and Tommy Gwaltney's Kansas City 9

- Goin' to Kansas City (Riverside, 1960)

With Helen Merrill

- The Artistry of Helen Merrill (Mainstream, 1965)

With Joe Glazer

- Garbage and Other Songs of Our Times (Collector, 1971)

With Malcolm Boyd

- Are You Running with Me, Jesus? (Columbia, 1965)
- Happening: Prayers for Now (Columbia, 1965)
