= List of awards and nominations received by Quincy Jones =

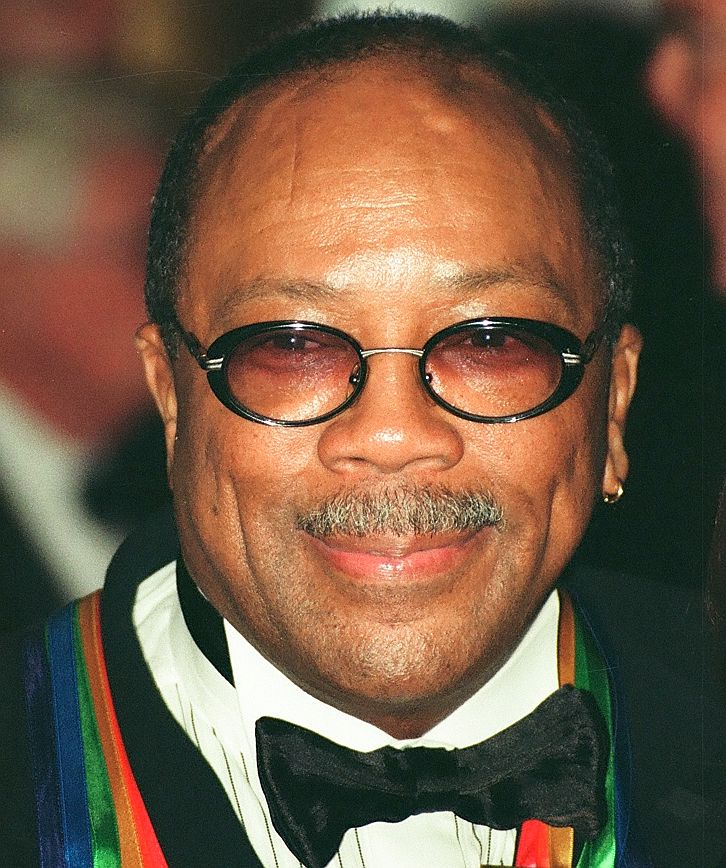
Jones in 2001

This article contains a list of awards and accolades won by and awarded to Quincy Jones.

Over his seven-decade-long career, he received numerous accolades, including 28 Grammy Awards, a Primetime Emmy Award, and a Tony Award. He received seven Academy Award nominations with no competitive wins. He won the Academy's Jean Hersholt Humanitarian Award and an Academy Honorary Award.

Jones also received numerous honorary awards and honorary doctorates. He received the Kennedy Center Honors in 2001, the National Medal of Arts in 2011 and received the French national honor of Commandeur Ordre des Arts et des Lettres from the Minister of Culture in France.

== Major associations ==
=== Academy Awards ===
Year	Category	Nominated work	Result	Ref.
1967	Best Original Score	In Cold Blood	Nominated	
1967	Best Song	"The Eyes of Love" from Banning	Nominated	
1968	Best Original Song for the Picture	"For Love of Ivy" from For Love Of Ivy	Nominated	
1978	Best Adaptation Score	The Wiz	Nominated	
1985	Best Original Score	The Color Purple	Nominated	
1985	Best Original Song	"Miss Celie's Blues (Sister)" from The Color Purple	Nominated	
1985	Best Picture	The Color Purple	Nominated	
1995	Jean Hersholt Humanitarian Award		Honored	
2025	Academy Honorary Award		Honored	

=== Emmy Awards ===
Year	Category	Nominated work	Result	Ref.
Primetime Emmy Awards
1977	Outstanding Music Composition for a Series	Roots: Part 1	Won	

=== Grammy Awards ===
Quincy Jones has 80 Grammy nominations and won 28 Grammy Awards, the third-most Grammys for any individual.

Year	Category	Nominated work	Result	Ref.
1961	Best Jazz Performance Large Group	The Great Wide World of Quincy Jones	Nominated	
1961	Best Arrangement	"Let the Good Times Roll" (Ray Charles vocal)	Nominated	
1962	Best Performance by an Orchestra - for Dancing	I Dig Dancers	Nominated	
1963	Best Original Jazz Composition	"Quintessence"	Nominated	
1963	Best Performance by an Orchestra - for Dancing	Big Band Bossa Nova	Nominated	
1963	Best Pop Instrumental Performance	"Big Band Bossa Nova"	Nominated	
1964	Best Instrumental Jazz Performance - Large Group	Quincy Jones Plays Hip Hits	Nominated	
1964	Best Pop Instrumental Performance	Quincy Jones Plays Hip Hits	Nominated	
1964	Best Instrumental Arrangement	"I Can't Stop Loving You"	Won	
1965	Best Large Jazz Ensemble Album	Quincy Jones Explores the Music of Henry Mancini	Nominated	
1965	Best Instrumental Arrangement	"Golden Boy (String Version)"	Nominated	
1965	Best Instrumental Performance - Non-Jazz	"Golden Boy (String Version)"	Nominated	
1965	Best Original Jazz Composition	"The Witching Hour"	Nominated	
1968	Best Score from a Motion Picture or Television Show	In the Heat of the Night	Nominated	
1970	Best Instrumental Arrangement	"Walking in Space"	Nominated	
1970	Best Large Jazz Ensemble	Walking in Space	Won	
1970	Best Score Written for a Motion Picture or Television	The Lost Man	Nominated	
1970	Best Score Written for a Motion Picture or Television	MacKenna's Gold	Nominated	
1970	Best Instrumental Theme	"MacKenna's Gold Overture"	Nominated	
1971	Best Instrumental Arrangement	"Gula Matari"	Nominated	
1971	Best Instrumental Composition	"Gula Matari"	Nominated	
1971	Best Large Jazz Ensemble Album	Gula Matari	Nominated	
1971	Best Contemporary Song	"Soul Flower"	Nominated	
1972	Best Pop Instrumental Performance	Smackwater Jack	Won	
1973	Best Score Soundtrack for Visual Media	Dollar$	Nominated	
1973	Best Pop Instrumental Performance with Vocal Coloring	"Money Runner"	Nominated	
1973	Best Arrangement, Instrumental or A Cappella	"Money Runner"	Nominated	
1974	Best Instrumental Arrangement	"Summer in the City"	Won	
1974	Best Pop Instrumental Performance	You've Got It Bad Girl	Nominated	
1975	Best Pop Vocal Performance by a Duo, Group or Chorus	Body Heat	Nominated	
1975	Best Pop Instrumental Performance	"Along Came Betty"	Nominated	
1976	Best Instrumental Composition	"Midnight Soul Patrol"	Nominated	
1978	Best Inspirational Performance	"O Lord, Come By Here"	Nominated	
1978	Best Instrumental Arrangement	"Roots Mural Theme"	Nominated	
1978	Best Instrumental Composition	"Roots Mural Theme"	Nominated	
1979	Producer of the Year		Nominated	
1979	Best Arrangement for Voices	"Stuff Like That"	Nominated	
1979	Best Instrumental Composition	"End of the Yellow Brick Road"	Nominated	
1979	Best Instrumental Arrangement	"The Wiz Main Title (Overture, Part I)"	Won	
1980	Producer of the Year		Nominated	
1980	Best Disco Recording	"Don't Stop 'til You Get Enough"	Nominated	
1981	Producer of the Year (Non-Classical)		Nominated	
1981	Best Instrumental Arrangement	"Dinorah, Dinorah"	Won	
1982	Album of the Year	The Dude	Nominated	
1982	Best R&B Performance by a Duo or Group with Vocal	The Dude	Won	
1982	Best Instrumental Arrangement Accompanying Vocal(s)	"Ai No Corrida"	Won	
1982	Best Arrangement on an Instrumental Recording	"Velas"	Won	
1982	Best Pop Instrumental Performance	"Velas"	Nominated	
1982	Producer of the Year		Won	
1982	Best Cast Show Album	Lena Horne: The Lady and Her Music	Won	
1983	Producer of the Year		Nominated	
1984	Album of the Year	Thriller	Won	
1984	Record of the Year	"Beat It"	Won	
1984	Best Rhythm & Blues Song	"P.Y.T. (Pretty Young Thing)"	Nominated	
1984	Best R&B Instrumental Performance	"Billie Jean"	Nominated	
1984	Best Recording for Children	E.T. The Extra-Terrestrial	Won	
1984	Producer of the Year (Non-Classical)		Won	
1984	Producer of the Year		Nominated	
1985	Best Arrangements on an Instrumental	"Grace (Gymnastics Theme)"	Won	
1985	Best Rhythm & Blues Song	"Yah Mo B There"	Nominated	
1986	Album of the Year	We Are the World	Nominated	
1986	Record of the Year	"We Are the World"	Won	
1986	Best Pop Duo or Group Performance	"We Are the World"	Won	
1986	Best Music Video	"We Are the World - The Video Event"	Won	
1988	Album of the Year	Bad	Nominated	
1988	Producer of the Year (Non-Classical)		Nominated	
1989	Record of the Year	"Man in the Mirror"	Nominated	
1991	Album of the Year	Back on the Block	Won	
1991	Best Arrangement on an Instrumental	"Birdland"	Won	
1991	Best Jazz Fusion Performance	"Birdland"	Won	
1991	Best Instrumental Arrangement Accompanying Vocal(s)	"The Places You Find Love"	Won	
1991	Best Rap Performance by a Duo or Group	"Back on the Block"	Won	
1991	Best Pop Instrumental Performance	"Setembro (Brazilian Wedding Song)"	Nominated	
1991	Producer of the Year		Won	
1994	Best Large Jazz Ensemble Performance	Miles & Quincy Live at Montreux	Won	
1994	Best Music Video, Long Form	Miles & Quincy Live at Montreux	Nominated	
1997	Best Arrangement, Instrumental and Vocals	"Do Nothin' Till You Hear from Me"	Nominated	
2002	Best Spoken Word Album	Q: The Autobiography of Quincy Jones	Won	
2002	Best Arrangement, Instrumental Or A Cappella	"Soul Bossa Nova"	Nominated	
2019	Best Music Film	Quincy	Won	
Special Grammy Awards
1989	Trustees Award		Won	
1991	Legend Award		Won	
1996	MusiCares Person of the Year		Won	

=== JASRAC Awards ===
Year	Category	for	Result	Ref.
2025	International Prize (highest revenue in royalties in Japan)	Soul Bossa Nova	Won	

=== Tony Awards ===
Year	Category	Nominated work	Result	Ref.
2006	Best Musical (as a producer)	The Color Purple	Nominated	
2016	Best Revival of a Musical (as a producer)	The Color Purple	Won	

== Special honors ==
=== Honorary awards ===
- In 1989, Quincy Jones was presented with the Sammy Cahn Lifetime Achievement Award from the Songwriters Hall of Fame.
- In 1994, he was awarded the Polar Music Prize.
- On March 26, 2001, Jones was appointed Commandeur (Commander) of the Légion d'Honneur for his significant achievements in his career.
- On June 24, 2008, at the BET Awards, Jones was presented with the Humanitarian Award.
- On October 1, 2008, Jones was presented with the Unity Through Music Award at Thank Q.
- On December 15, 2008, Jones was inducted in the California Hall of Fame at The California Museum in Sacramento, California.
- On September 24, 2009, Jones was honored with a Clinton Global Citizen award for Leadership in Philanthropy.
- In 2013, Jones was inducted into the Rock and Roll Hall of Fame.
- In October 2014, Jones was made Commandeur Ordre des Arts et des Lettres from the Minister of Culture in France.
- In 2015, Jones was the recipient of the Desi Arnaz Pioneer Award by the Latin Songwriters Hall of Fame.
- In May 2021, Jones was one of 10 new members elected to the Royal Swedish Academy of Music.
- In 2021, Jones was inducted into the Black Music & Entertainment Walk of Fame, as a "foundational inductee".
- In 2025, Jones was posthumously inducted into the National Rhythm and Blues Hall of Fame.

=== Honorary degrees ===
State and academic honours for Streep
Year	Country or organization	Award	Ref.
1983	Berklee College of Music	Honorary doctorate	
1990	Seattle University	Honorary degree	
2005	United Negro College Fund	Evening of Stars honor	
2005	Dance Music Hall of Fame	Honorary ceremony	
2005	University of Pennsylvania	Honorary Doctorate of Music	
2007	Morehouse College	Honorary Doctorate of humanities	
2007	Harvard School of Public Health	Mentor of the Year	
2007	Harvard University	"Q Prize" Gala	
2007	UCLA Spring Sing	George and Ira Gershwin Award	
2008	Princeton University	Honorary doctorate degree	
2008	Washington University in St. Louis	Honorary Doctorate of Arts degree	
2008	University of Washington	Honorary degree	
2008	Garfield High School's	Quincy Jones Performing Arts Center dedication	
2009	Royal Welsh College of Music and Drama	Lifetime achievement Fellow	
2010	Jacobs School of Music at Indiana University	Honorary Doctorate of Music	

=== Citations ===
- In July 1969, Jones's arrangement of "Fly Me to the Moon" recorded by Frank Sinatra and the Count Basie Orchestra was the first music played on NASA's first lunar landing mission by astronaut Buzz Aldrin.
- In 2000, Harvard University endowed the Quincy Jones Professorship of Afro-American Music with a grant of $3 million from Time Warner. The endowed chair for African-American music, housed in Harvard's African and African-American Studies Department, is believed to be the first in the nation, and is presently held by the ethnomusicologist Ingrid Monson. Distinguished scholar and public intellectual Henry Louis Gates Jr. was a close, personal friend of Jones.
- In December 2009, Jones was honored by Swiss-watch manufacturer Audemars Piguet with a limited edition watch with a case back engraved with Quincy Jones' signature, and reading "Millenary Quincy Jones – Limited Edition" as a reminder of its exclusivity. Only 500 pieces of the watch were produced.
