= Quincy Jones =

American record producer and musician (1933–2024)

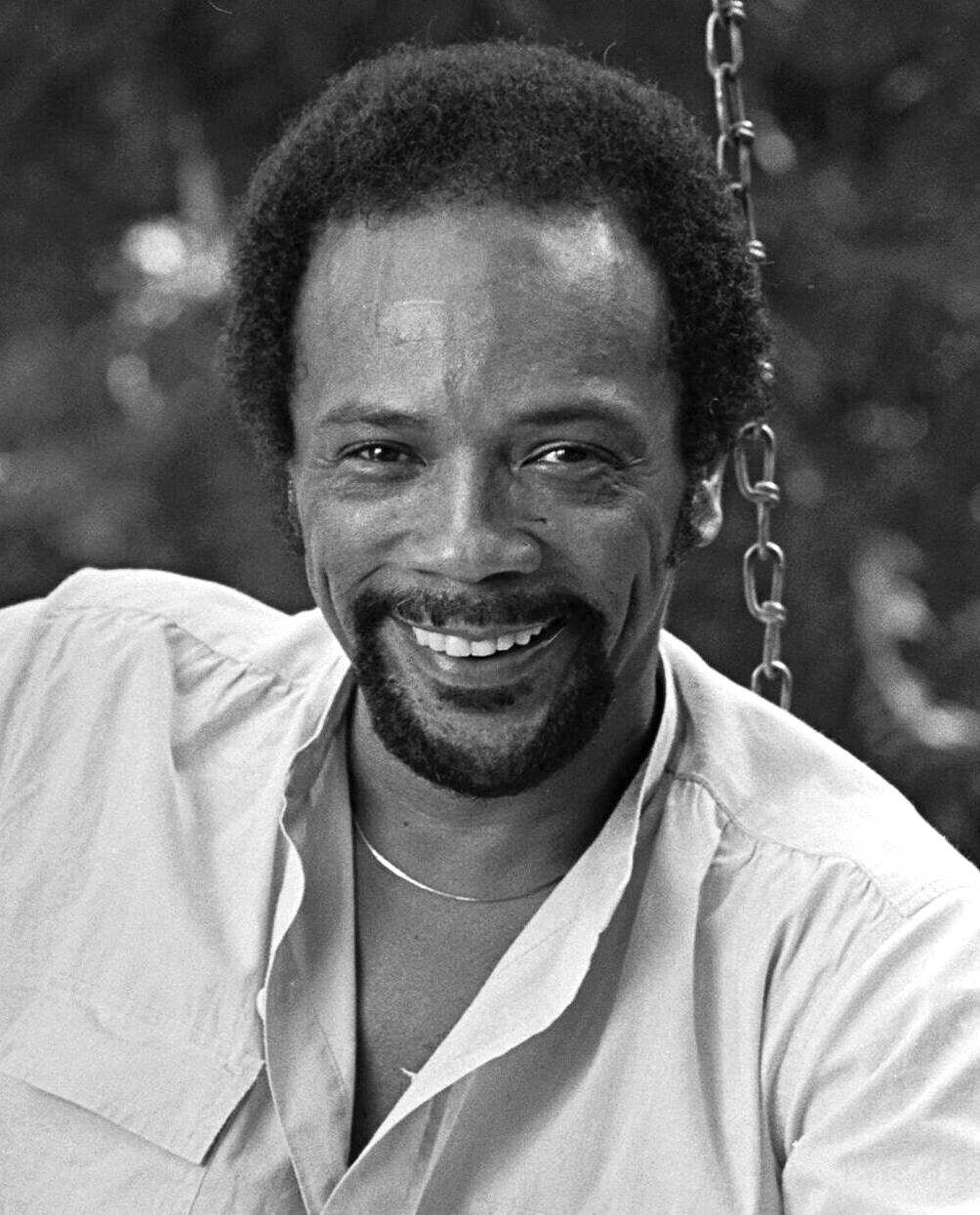
- Jones in 1980
- Born: Quincy Delight Jones Jr. March 14, 1933; Chicago, Illinois, U.S.
- Died: November 3, 2024 (aged 91); Los Angeles, California, U.S.
- Resting place: Hillside Memorial Park Cemetery
- Occupations: Record producer; composer; arranger; conductor; musician
- Years active: 1951–2024
- Spouses: Jeri Caldwell (m. 1957; div. 1966) Ulla Andersson (m. 1967; div. 1974) Peggy Lipton (m. 1974; div. 1990)
- Partner: Nastassja Kinski (1991–1995)
- Children: 7, including Quincy III, Kidada, Rashida, and Kenya
- Relatives: Richard A. Jones (half-brother)
- Awards: Full list
- Musical career
- Genres: Big band; soul; jazz; R&B
- Instruments: Trumpet; keyboards
- Works: Full list
- Labels: Warner Bros.; Columbia; Mercury; A&M; Qwest; Epic; ABC; Interscope

Quincy Delight Jones Jr. (March 14, 1933 – November 3, 2024) was an American record producer, musician, and composer. During his seven-decade career, he received dozens of accolades, including 28 Grammy Awards, a Primetime Emmy Award, and a Tony Award as well as nominations for seven Academy Awards and four Golden Globe Awards.

Jones earned a scholarship to Seattle University in 1951 before transferring to what is now the Berklee College of Music in Boston. He came to prominence in the 1950s as a jazz arranger and conductor before producing pop hit records for Lesley Gore in the early 1960s (including "It's My Party") and serving as an arranger and conductor for several collaborations between Frank Sinatra and the jazz artist Count Basie.

Jones produced three of the most successful albums by Michael Jackson: Off the Wall (1979), Thriller (1982), and Bad (1987). In 1985, Jones produced and conducted the charity song "We Are the World", which raised funds for victims of famine in Ethiopia. He also composed numerous film scores including for The Pawnbroker (1965), In the Heat of the Night and In Cold Blood (both 1967), The Italian Job (1969), The Wiz (1978), and The Color Purple (1985), three of which earned him four of his nominations to seven Academy Awards. He won the Primetime Emmy Award for Outstanding Music Composition for a Series for the miniseries Roots (1977) and received a Tony Award for Best Revival of a Musical as a producer for the 2016 revival of The Color Purple.

Jones received many honorary awards, including the Grammy Legend Award in 1992, the Jean Hersholt Humanitarian Award in 1995, the Kennedy Center Honors in 2001, the National Medal of the Arts in 2011, the Ordre des Arts et des Lettres in 2014, and the posthumous Academy Honorary Award in 2025. He was also named one of the most influential jazz musicians of the 20th century by Time. Jones died at the age of 91 in November 2024.

== Early life and education ==
Quincy Delight Jones Jr. was born in the South Side of Chicago on March 14, 1933, the elder of two sons to Sara Frances (née Wells; later Taylor; 1904–1999), a bank officer and apartment complex manager, and Quincy Delight Jones (1895–1971), a semi-professional baseball player and carpenter from Charleston, South Carolina. Quincy Jr.'s paternal grandmother was a formerly enslaved woman from Louisville, and he later discovered that his paternal grandfather was Welsh.

Furthermore, Jones said, "He had a baby with my great-grandmother [a slave], and my [maternal] grandmother was born there [on a plantation in Kentucky]. We traced this all the way back to the Laniers, the same family as Tennessee Williams." Learning that the Lanier immigrant ancestors were French Huguenots who had court musicians among their ancestors, Jones attributed some of his musicianship to them.

For the 2006 PBS television program African American Lives, Jones had his DNA tested and genealogists researched his family history again. His DNA revealed he was mostly African, but also had 34% European ancestry on both sides of his family. Research showed that he had English, French, Italian, and Welsh ancestry through his father. His mother's side was of West and Central African descent, specifically from the Tikar people of Cameroon. His mother also had European ancestry, including Lanier male ancestors who fought for the Confederacy, making him eligible for membership in the Sons of Confederate Veterans. Among his ancestors was Elizabeth Washington Lewis, a sister of president George Washington.

Jones's family moved to Chicago during the Great Migration. Jones had a younger brother, Lloyd, who was an engineer for the Seattle television station KOMO-TV until his death in 1998. Jones was introduced to music by his mother who always sang religious songs, and next-door neighbor Lucy Jackson. When Jones was five or six, Jackson played stride piano next door, and he would listen through the walls. Jackson recalled that after he heard her playing one day, she could not get him off her piano.

When Jones was young, his mother had a schizophrenic breakdown and was sent to a mental institution. His father divorced her and married Elvera Jones, who already had three children: Waymond, Theresa, and Katherine. Elvera and Quincy Sr. had three more children together: Jeanette, Margie, and Richard. The family moved to Sinclair Park, a segregated community in Bremerton, Washington, in 1943. Jones's father took a wartime job at the Puget Sound Naval Shipyard.

After the war, the family moved to Seattle, where Jones attended Garfield High School and developed his skills as a trumpeter and arranger. His classmates included Charles Taylor, who played saxophone and whose mother, Evelyn Bundy, was one of Seattle's first society jazz bandleaders. Jones and Taylor began playing music together,

At the age of fourteen, Jones joined Taylor's group playing Seattle's Washington Social Club, the Black Elks Club, and all over the Northwest, backing Billie Holiday and Billy Eckstine. He met Ray Charles, then an unknown 16-year-old musician from Florida going by R.C. Robinson, playing bebop piano and alto sax and singing like Nat Cole.

Jones credited his father's sturdy work ethic with giving him the means to proceed, and his loving nature with holding the family together. Jones cited his father's rhyming motto: "Once a task is just begun, never leave until it's done. Be the labor great or small, do it well or not at all."

Jones earned a scholarship to Seattle University in 1951. After one semester, he transferred to what is now the Berklee College of Music in Boston on another scholarship, where he played at Izzy Ort's Bar & Grille with Bunny Campbell and Preston Sandiford, whom he cited as important influences.

== Career ==
=== 1953–1960: Career beginnings with jazz music ===
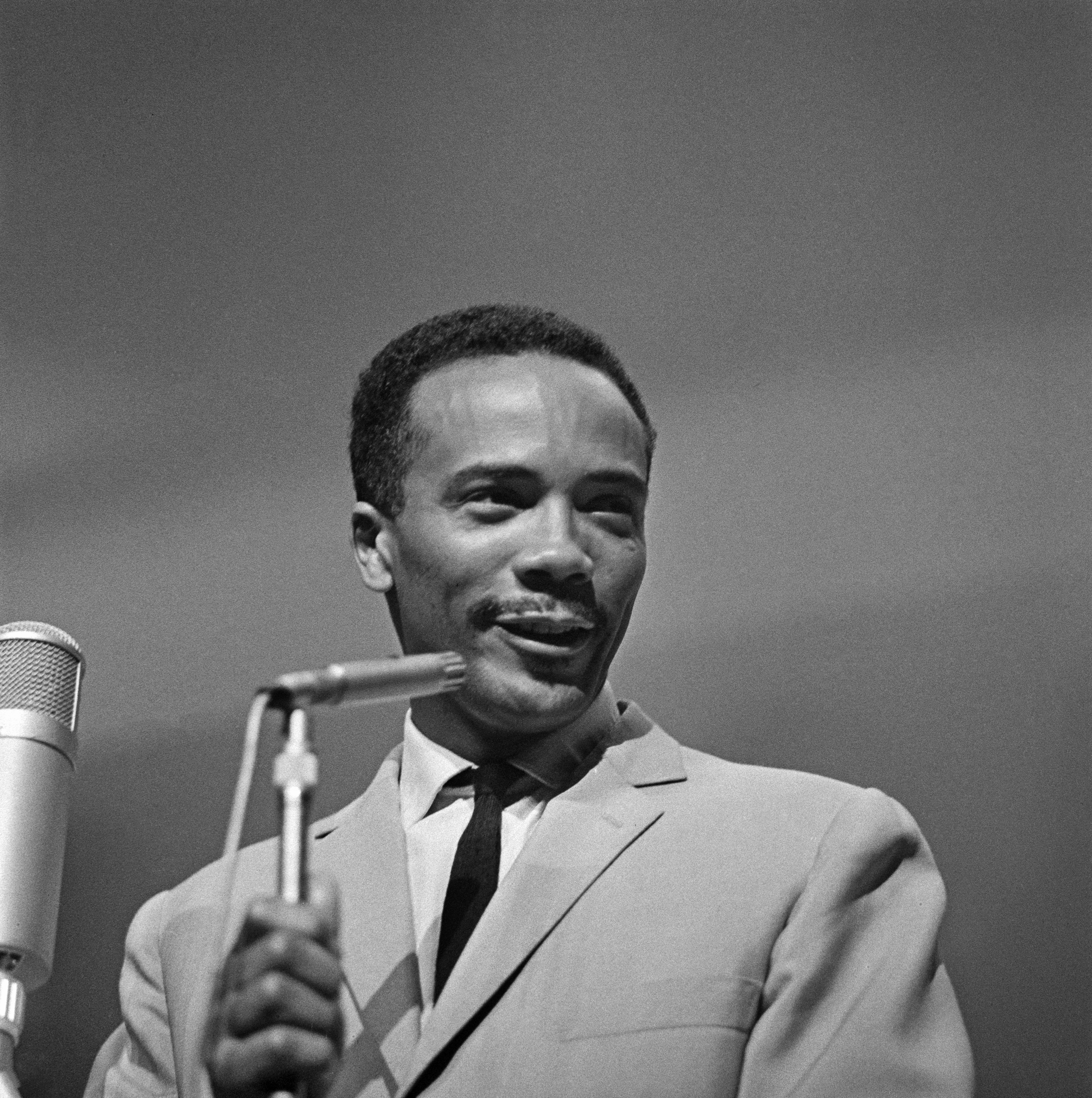
Jones Orchestra performing at Kulttuuritalo in Helsinki, 1960

In 1953, at age 20, Jones traveled with jazz bandleader Lionel Hampton for a European tour of the Hampton orchestra. He said the tour changed his view of racism in the United States, "It gave you some sense of perspective on past, present, and future. It took the myopic conflict between just black and white in the United States and put it on another level because you saw the turmoil between the Armenians and the Turks, and the Cypriots and the Greeks, and the Swedes and the Danes, and the Koreans and the Japanese. Everybody had these hassles, and you saw it was a basic part of human nature, these conflicts. It opened my soul; it opened my mind."

After leaving the Hampton band in 1954, Jones settled in New York, and started writing "for anyone who would pay". In early 1956, he accepted a temporary job at CBS' Stage Show hosted by Jimmy and Tommy Dorsey that was broadcast live from Studio 50 in New York City (known today as the Ed Sullivan Theater). On January 28, February 4, 11 and 18, as well as on March 17 and 24, Jones played second trumpet in the studio band that supported 21-year-old Elvis Presley in his first six television appearances. Presley sang "Heartbreak Hotel", which became his first No. 1 record and the Billboard magazine Pop Record of the year. Soon after, as a trumpeter and musical director for Dizzy Gillespie, Jones went on tour of the Middle East and South America sponsored by the United States Information Agency. After returning, he signed a contract with ABC-Paramount and started his recording career as the leader of his band. In 1957, he moved to Paris, where he studied composition and theory with Nadia Boulanger and Olivier Messiaen and performed at the Paris Olympia. Jones became music director at Barclay, a French record company (and the licensee for Mercury in France).

In the 1950s, Jones toured Europe with several jazz orchestras. As musical director of Harold Arlen's jazz musical Free and Easy, he took to the road again. With musicians from the Arlen show, he formed his big band, The Jones Boys, with eighteen musicians. The band included double bass player Eddie Jones and trumpeter Reunald Jones. None of the three were related. The band toured North America and Europe, and the concerts met enthusiastic audiences and sparkling reviews, but the earnings failed to support a band of this size. Poor budget planning resulted in an economic disaster. The band dissolved, leaving Jones in a financial crisis. "We had the best jazz band on the planet, and yet we were literally starving. That's when I discovered that there was music, and there was the music business. If I were to survive, I would have to learn the difference between the two." Irving Green, head of Mercury, helped Jones with a personal loan and a job as musical director of the company's New York division.

Jones first worked with Frank Sinatra in 1958 when invited by Princess Grace to arrange a benefit concert at the Monaco Sporting Club. Six years later, Sinatra hired him to arrange and conduct Sinatra's second album with Count Basie, It Might as Well Be Swing (1964). Jones conducted and arranged Sinatra's live album with the Basie Band, Sinatra at the Sands (1966). Jones was also the arranger/conductor when Sinatra, Sammy Davis Jr., Dean Martin, and Johnny Carson performed with the Basie orchestra in June 1965 in St. Louis, Missouri, in a benefit for Dismas House. The fund-raiser was broadcast to movie theaters around the country and eventually released on VHS. Later that year, Jones was the arranger/conductor when Sinatra and Basie appeared on The Hollywood Palace TV variety show on October 16, 1965. Nineteen years later, Sinatra and Jones teamed up for the 1984 album L.A. Is My Lady. Jones said,

Frank Sinatra took me to a whole new planet. I worked with him until he passed away in '98. He left me his ring. I never take it off. Now, when I go to Sicily, I don't need a passport. I just flash my ring.

=== 1961–1977: Breakthrough and acclaim ===
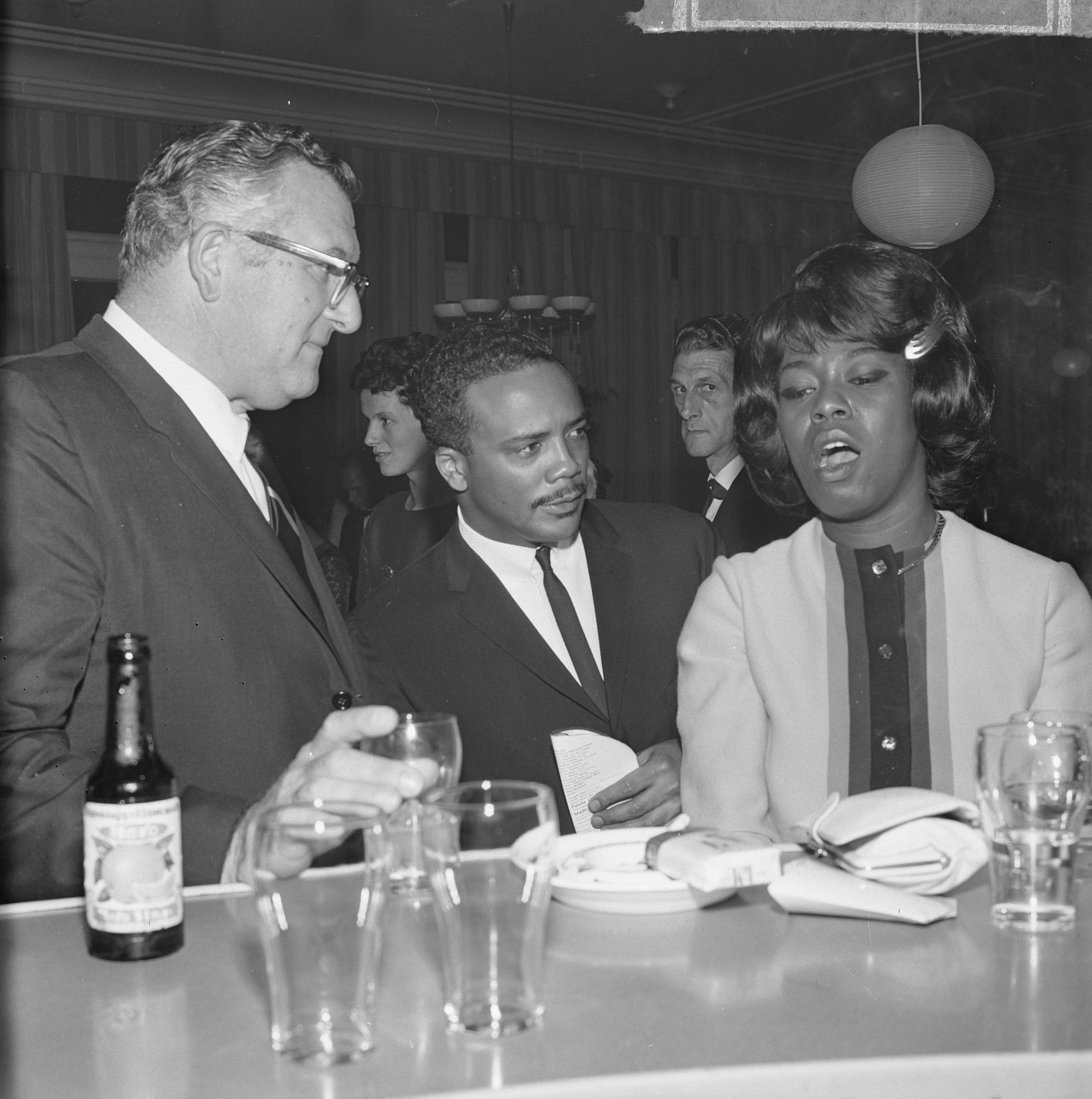
Jones and Sarah Vaughan at the Kurhaus of Scheveningen for the Grand Gala du Disque Populaire in the Netherlands, 1963

In 1961, Jones was promoted and became the vice-president of Mercury, the first African American to hold the position. In 1963 he had his first number 1 record with "It's My Party" by Lesley Gore.

At the invitation of director Sidney Lumet, he composed music for The Pawnbroker (1964). It was the first of his nearly 40 major motion picture scores. Following the success of The Pawnbroker, Jones left Mercury and moved to Los Angeles. After composing film scores for Mirage and The Slender Thread in 1965, he was in constant demand as a composer. His film credits over the next seven years came to include Walk, Don't Run, The Deadly Affair, In Cold Blood, In the Heat of the Night, Mackenna's Gold, The Italian Job, Bob & Carol & Ted & Alice, Cactus Flower, The Out-of-Towners, They Call Me Mister Tibbs!, The Anderson Tapes, $ (Dollars), and The Getaway.

He composed "The Streetbeater", which became the theme music for the television sitcom Sanford and Son, starring his close friend Redd Foxx, and the themes for other TV shows, including Ironside, Rebop, Banacek, The Bill Cosby Show, the opening episode of Roots and the game show Now You See It.

In the 1960s, Jones worked as an arranger for Billy Eckstine, Ella Fitzgerald, Shirley Horn, Peggy Lee, Nana Mouskouri, Frank Sinatra, Sarah Vaughan, and Dinah Washington. His solo recordings included Walking in Space, Gula Matari, Smackwater Jack, You've Got It Bad Girl, Body Heat, Mellow Madness, and I Heard That!!

Jones's 1962 tune "Soul Bossa Nova", which originated on the Big Band Bossa Nova album, was later used as the theme for the 1997 spy comedy Austin Powers: International Man of Mystery.

Jones produced all four million-selling singles for Lesley Gore during the early and mid-1960s, including "It's My Party" (UK No. 8; US No. 1), its sequel "Judy's Turn to Cry" (US No. 5), "She's a Fool" (also a US No. 5) in 1963, and "You Don't Own Me" (US No. 2 for four weeks in 1964). He continued to produce for Gore until 1966, including notable hits like "That's the Way Boys Are" (US No. 12 in 1964), the Greenwich/Barry hits "Look of Love" (US No. 27 in 1965) and "Maybe I Know" (UK No. 20; US No. 14 in 1964), "Sunshine, Lollipops And Rainbows" (No. 13 in 1965), and "My Town, My Guy And Me" (No. 32 in 1965).

In 1975, Jones founded Qwest Productions, for which he arranged and produced successful albums by Frank Sinatra and others. He also reunited with Lesley Gore that year, producing her critically acclaimed album Love Me By Name, released on A&M Records.

=== 1978–1989: Exploration into pop music ===
In 1978, he produced the soundtrack for The Wiz, the musical adaptation of The Wizard of Oz, which starred Michael Jackson and Diana Ross. While working on The Wiz, Jackson asked Jones to recommend some producers for his upcoming solo album. Jones offered some names but eventually offered to produce the record himself. Jackson accepted and the resulting record, Off the Wall, sold about 20 million copies. This made Jones the most powerful record producer in the industry at that time. Jones and Jackson's next collaboration, Thriller, sold 70 million copies and became the highest-selling album of all time. The rise of MTV and the advent of music videos as promotional tools also contributed to Thriller's sales. Jones worked on Jackson's album Bad, which sold 35 million copies, and was the last time they worked with each other. Audio interviews with Jones are included in the 2001 special editions of Off the Wall, Thriller, and Bad.

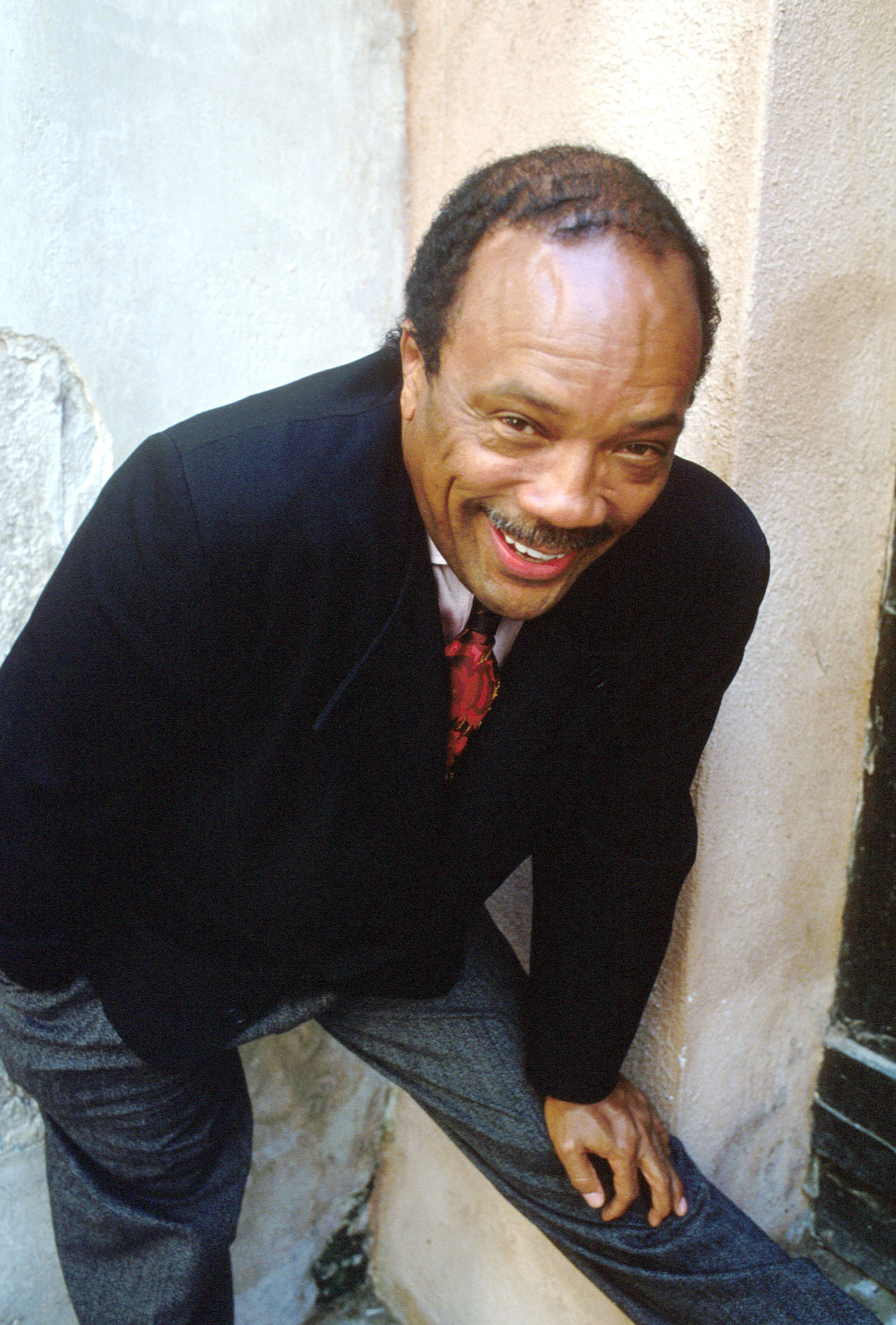
Jones in Venice, Italy, 1989

His 1981 album The Dude yielded the hits "Ai No Corrida" (a remake of a song by Chaz Jankel), "Just Once", and "One Hundred Ways", both sung by James Ingram. Marking Jones's debut as a film producer, 1985's The Color Purple received 11 Oscar nominations that year, including one for Jones's score. Jones, Thomas Newman, and Alan Silvestri are the only composers besides John Williams to have written scores for a Steven Spielberg-directed theatrical feature film. Additionally, through this picture, Jones is credited with introducing Whoopi Goldberg and Oprah Winfrey to film audiences around the world.

After the 1985 American Music Awards ceremony, Jones used his influence to draw most of the major American recording artists of the day into a studio to record the song "We Are the World" to raise money for the victims of famine in Ethiopia. When people marveled at his ability to make the collaboration work, Jones explained that he had taped a sign on the entrance reading "Check Your Ego at the Door". He was also quoted as saying, "We don't want to make a hunger record in tuxedos", requiring all participants to wear casual clothing in the studio. In 1986, Jones started off Qwest Entertainment to produce theatrical feature films, through Qwest Film and Television. He launched a home video label, Qwest Home Video, in order to manage the home video titles made by the studio. Qwest Entertainment continued to operate their pre-existing subsidiaries like Qwest Records, Quincy Jones Productions and Qwest Music Publishing.

=== 1990–2007: Established career ===
The logo for Quincy Jones Productions

In 1990, Quincy Jones Productions joined with Time Warner to create Quincy Jones Entertainment (QJE). The company signed a 10-picture deal with Warner Bros. and a two-series deal with NBC Productions, now Universal Television. The television show The Fresh Prince of Bel-Air (Will Smith's first acting credit) began in 1990, while In the House (on NBC and UPN) aired from 1995 to 1999. Jones also produced first-run syndication's The Jenny Jones Show (in association with Telepictures Productions, 1994–1997 only) and FOX's Mad TV, which ran for 14 seasons. In the early 1990s, he started a huge, ongoing project called "The Evolution of Black Music". QJE started a weekly talk show with Jones's friend, Reverend Jesse Jackson, as the host.

Beginning in the late 1970s, Jones had tried to convince Miles Davis to revive the music he recorded on several classic albums of the 1950s, which was arranged by Gil Evans. Davis always refused, citing a desire to avoid revisiting the past. In 1991, Davis relented. Despite having pneumonia, he agreed to perform the music at the Montreux Jazz Festival. The recording, Miles & Quincy Live at Montreux, was his last album; he died several months afterward. Jones had a brief appearance in the 1990 video for the Time song "Jerk Out", and was a guest actor on an episode of The Boondocks. He appeared with Ray Charles in the music video of their song "One Mint Julep" and also with Ray Charles and Chaka Khan in the music video of their song "I'll Be Good to You". Jones hosted an episode of Saturday Night Live on February 10, 1990, during SNL's 15th season. The episode was notable for having 10 musical guests, the most any SNL episode has had in its years on the air: Tevin Campbell, Andrae Crouch, Sandra Crouch, rappers Kool Moe Dee and Big Daddy Kane, Melle Mel, Quincy D III, Siedah Garrett, Al Jarreau, and Take 6, and for a performance of Dizzy Gillespie's "Manteca" by the SNL Band, conducted by Jones. Jones impersonated Marion Barry, the former mayor of Washington, D.C., in the recurring sketch The Bob Waltman Special. He later produced his own sketch comedy show, FOX's Mad TV, which ran from 1995 to 2009.

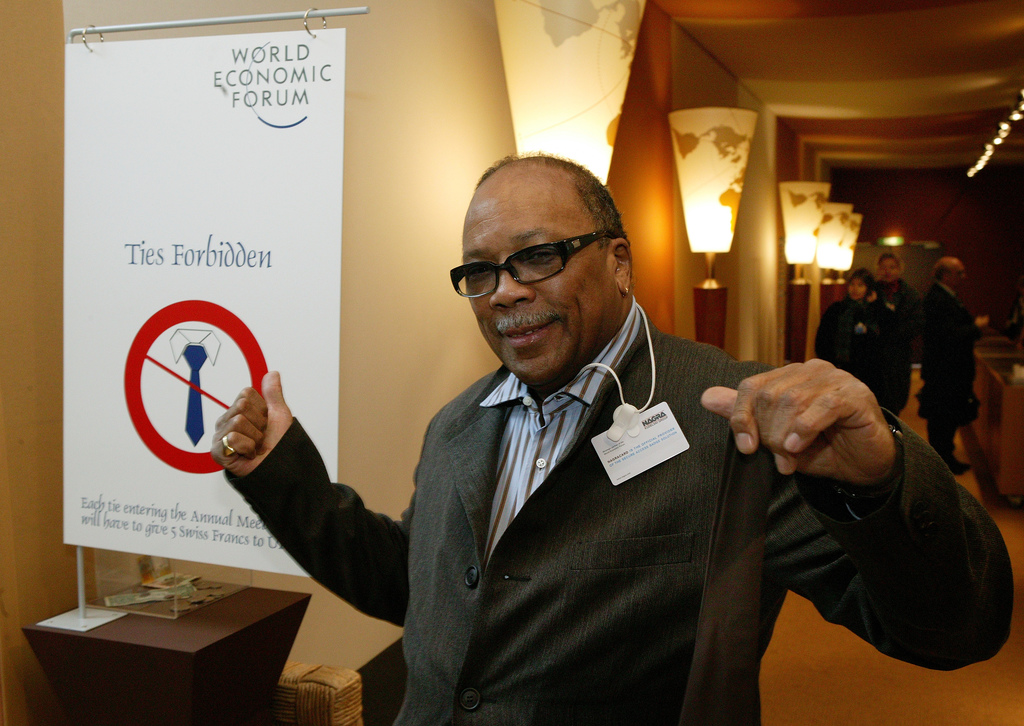
Jones during an annual meeting of the World Economic Forum in Davos, Switzerland, 2004

In 1993, Jones collaborated with David Salzman to produce the concert An American Reunion, a celebration of Bill Clinton's inauguration as President of the United States. During the same year, he and Salzman renamed his company to Quincy Jones/David Salzman Entertainment.

In 2001, Jones published his autobiography Q: The Autobiography of Quincy Jones. In a 2002 interview, when asked if he would work with Jones again, Michael Jackson suggested he might. But in 2007, when Jones was asked by NME, he said: "Man, please! We already did that. I have talked to him about working with him again but I've got too much to do. I've got 900 products, I'm 74 years old." Following Jackson's death on June 25, 2009, Jones said, "I am absolutely devastated at this tragic and unexpected news. For Michael to be taken away from us so suddenly at such a young age, I just don't have the words. Divinity brought our souls together on The Wiz and allowed us to do what we were able to throughout the '80s. To this day, the music we created together on Off the Wall, Thriller and Bad is played in every corner of the world, and the reason for that is because he had it all ... talent, grace, professionalism, and dedication. He was the consummate entertainer, and his contributions and legacy will be felt upon the world forever. I've lost my little brother today, and part of my soul has gone with him."

Jones appeared in the 1999 Walt Disney Pictures animated film Fantasia 2000, introducing the set piece of George Gershwin's Rhapsody in Blue. In 2002, he made a cameo appearance as himself in the film Austin Powers in Goldmember.

=== 2007–2024: Later work and final years ===
On February 10, 2008, Jones joined Usher in presenting the Grammy Award for Album of the Year to Herbie Hancock.

On January 6, 2009, Jones appeared on NBC's Last Call with Carson Daly to discuss his career. Daly informally floated the idea that Jones should become the first minister of culture for the United States, pending the inauguration of Barack Obama as president. Daly noted that only the US and Germany, among leading world countries, did not have a cabinet-level position for this role. Commentators on NPR and in the Chronicle of Higher Education also discussed the topic of a minister of culture.

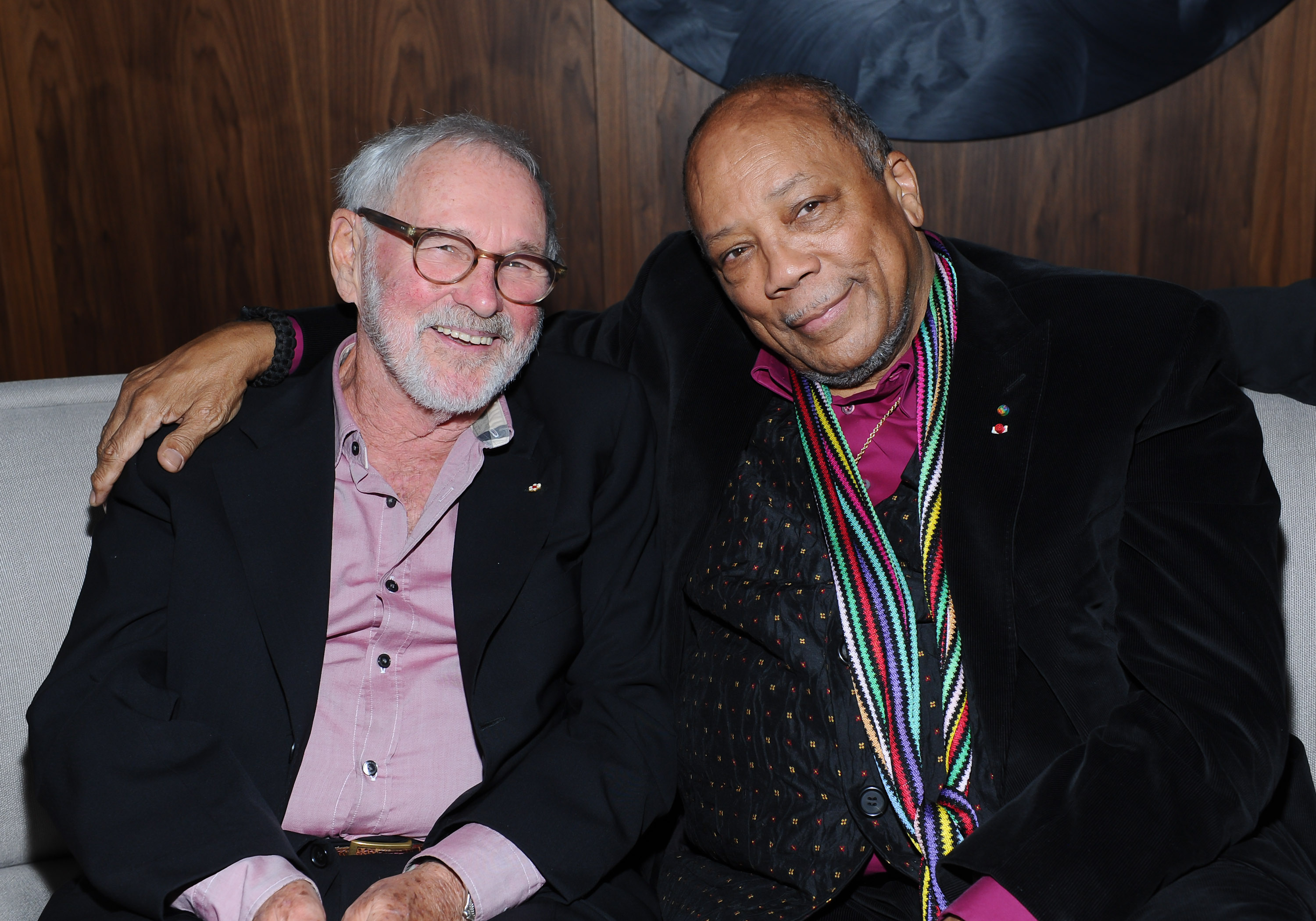
Norman Jewison with Jones in 2014

In July 2007, Jones partnered with Wizzard Media to start the Quincy Jones Video Podcast. In each episode, he shares his knowledge and experience in the music industry. The first episode features him in the studio producing "I Knew I Loved You" for Celine Dion. This song is included on the Ennio Morricone tribute album We All Love Ennio Morricone. Jones helped produce Anita Hall's 2009 album Send Love. In 2013, he produced Emily Bear's album Diversity. After that, he produced albums for Grace, Justin Kauflin, Alfredo Rodríguez, Andreas Varady, and Nikki Yanofsky. He also became a mentor to Jacob Collier.

In 2010, Jones, along with brand strategist Chris Vance, co-founded Playground Sessions, a NY City-based developer of subscription software that teaches people to play the piano using interactive videos. Pianists Harry Connick Jr. and David Sides are among the company's video instructors. Jones worked with Vance and Sides to develop the video lessons and incorporate techniques to modernize the instruction format.

In February 2014, Jones appeared in Keep on Keepin' On, a documentary about his friend, jazz trumpeter and flugelhorn player Clark Terry. In the film, Terry introduces Jones to his protégé Justin Kauflin, whom Jones then signs to his band and label. In July 2014, Jones starred in a documentary film called The Distortion of Sound. He was featured on Jacob Collier's YouTube cover of Michael Jackson's "P.Y.T. (Pretty Young Thing)". On February 28, 2016, he and Pharrell Williams presented Ennio Morricone with the Oscar for Best Original Score. In August 2016, he and his music were featured at the BBC Proms in the Royal Albert Hall, London. In 2017, Jones and French producer Reza Ackbaraly started Qwest TV, the world's first subscription video-on-demand (SVOD) service for jazz and eclectic music from around the world. The platform features a handpicked selection of ad-free concerts, interviews, documentaries, and exclusive, original content, all in HD or 4K.

On March 20, 2020, Jones appeared in a music video by Travis Scott and Young Thug for the song "Out West". In January 2022, Jones appeared on the album Dawn FM by Canadian singer the Weeknd, performing a monolog in the sixth track, "A Tale by Quincy".

== Activism ==
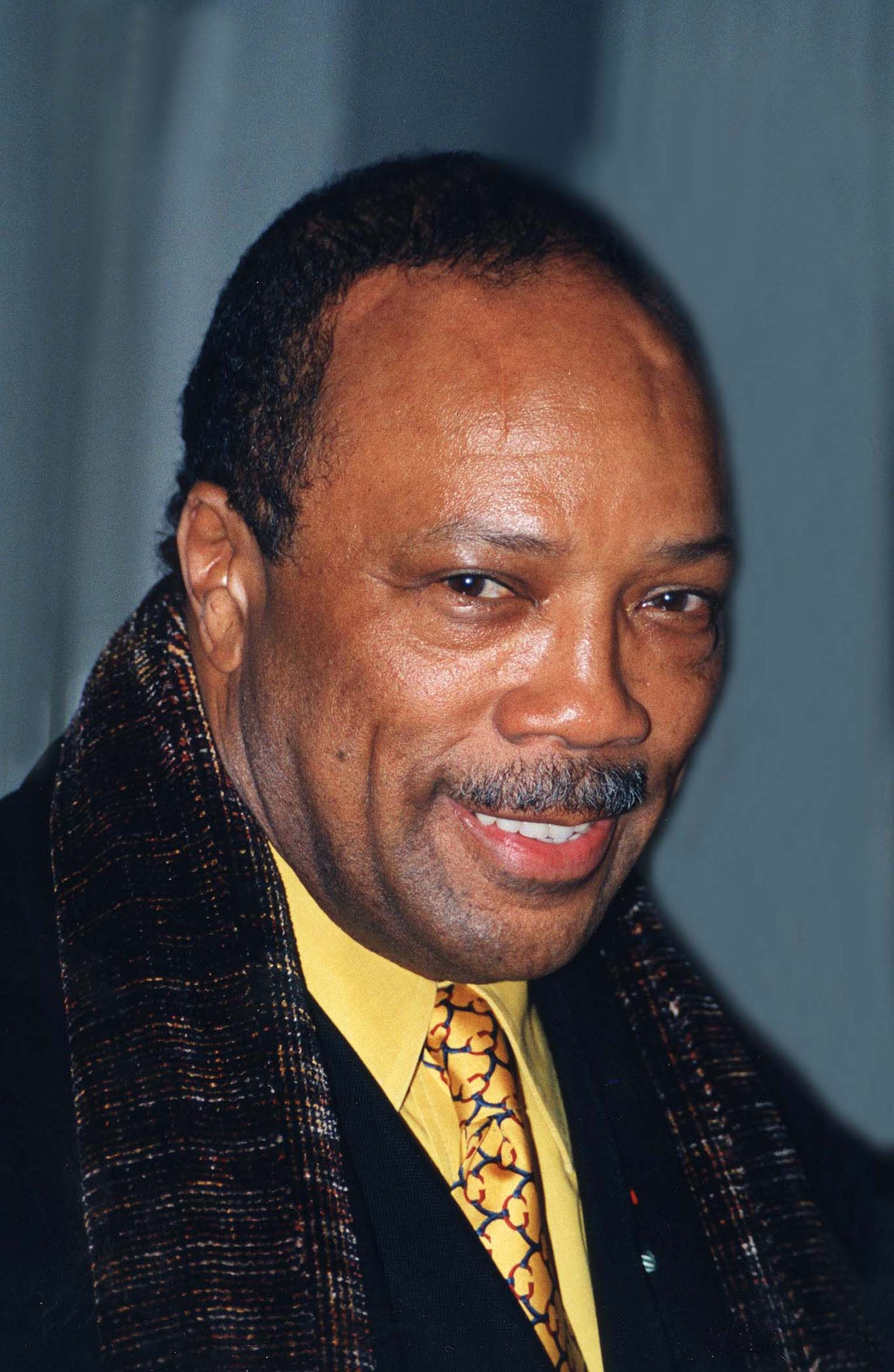
Jones at the Watergate Hotel in Washington, D.C., 1997

Jones's social activism began in the 1960s with his support of Martin Luther King Jr. Jones was one of the founders of the Institute for Black American Music (IBAM), whose events aimed to raise funds for the creation of a national library of African-American art and music. Jones was also one of the founders of the Black Arts Festival in his hometown of Chicago. In the 1970s, Jones formed the Quincy Jones Workshops. Meeting at the Los Angeles Landmark Variety Arts Center, the workshops educated and honed the skills of inner-city youth in musicianship, acting, and songwriting. Among its alumni were Alton McClain, who had a hit song with Alton McClain and Destiny, and Mark Wilkins, who co-wrote the hit song "Havin' a Love Attack" with Mandrill and became National Promotion Director for Mystic Records.

For many years, Jones worked closely with Bono of U2 on a number of philanthropic causes. He was the founder of the Quincy Jones Listen Up Foundation, a nonprofit organization that built more than 100 homes in South Africa and which aimed to connect youths with technology, education, culture, and music. One of the organization's programs was an intercultural exchange between underprivileged youths from Los Angeles and South Africa.

In 2004, Jones helped to launch the We Are the Future (WAF) project, which gave children in poor and conflict-ridden areas a chance to live their childhoods and develop a sense of hope. The program was the result of a strategic partnership between the Global Forum, the Quincy Jones Listen Up Foundation, and Hani Masri, with the support of the World Bank, UN agencies, and major companies. The project was launched with a concert in Rome, Italy, in front of an audience of half a million people.

Jones supported a number of other charities, including the NAACP, GLAAD, Peace Games, AmfAR, and the Maybach Foundation. He served on the advisory board of HealthCorps. In July 2007, he announced his endorsement of Hillary Clinton for president. With the election of Barack Obama, Jones said that his next conversation "with President Obama [will be] to beg for a secretary of arts". This prompted the circulation of an internet petition, asking Obama to create such a Cabinet-level position in his administration.

In 2001, Jones became an honorary member of the board of directors of the Jazz Foundation of America. He worked with the foundation to save the homes and lives of America's elderly jazz and blues musicians, including those who had survived Hurricane Katrina. Jones was a spokesperson for the Global Down Syndrome Foundation, co-founded by his friend John Sie, which annually awarded the Quincy Jones Exceptional Advocacy Award. He was also involved in the Linda Crnic Institute which aimed to improve the lives of people with Down Syndrome through advanced biomedical research.

== Personal life ==
=== Marriages, relationships, and children ===
Jones was married three times and had seven children with five women. He was married to Jeri Caldwell from 1957 to 1966, and they had a daughter named Jolie. He then had a brief affair with Carol Reynolds, and they had a daughter named Rachel. Jones was later married to Swedish actress Ulla Andersson from 1967 to 1974, and they had a daughter named Martina and a son named Quincy, who also became a music producer.

The day after his divorce from Andersson, Jones married American actress Peggy Lipton. They had two daughters, Kidada, who was born before they were married, and Rashida, both of whom became actresses. Jones and Lipton divorced in 1990. He later dated and lived with German actress Nastassja Kinski from 1991 to 1995, and they had a daughter named Kenya, who became a fashion model. In an interview with the New York Magazine, Jones stated that he dated Ivanka Trump.

In 1994, rapper Tupac Shakur criticized Jones for having relationships with white women, prompting Jones's daughter, Rashida, to pen a scathing open letter in response, which was published in The Source. Jones's daughter, Kidada, subsequently developed a romantic relationship with Shakur and was dating him at the time of his death.

=== Interests and beliefs ===
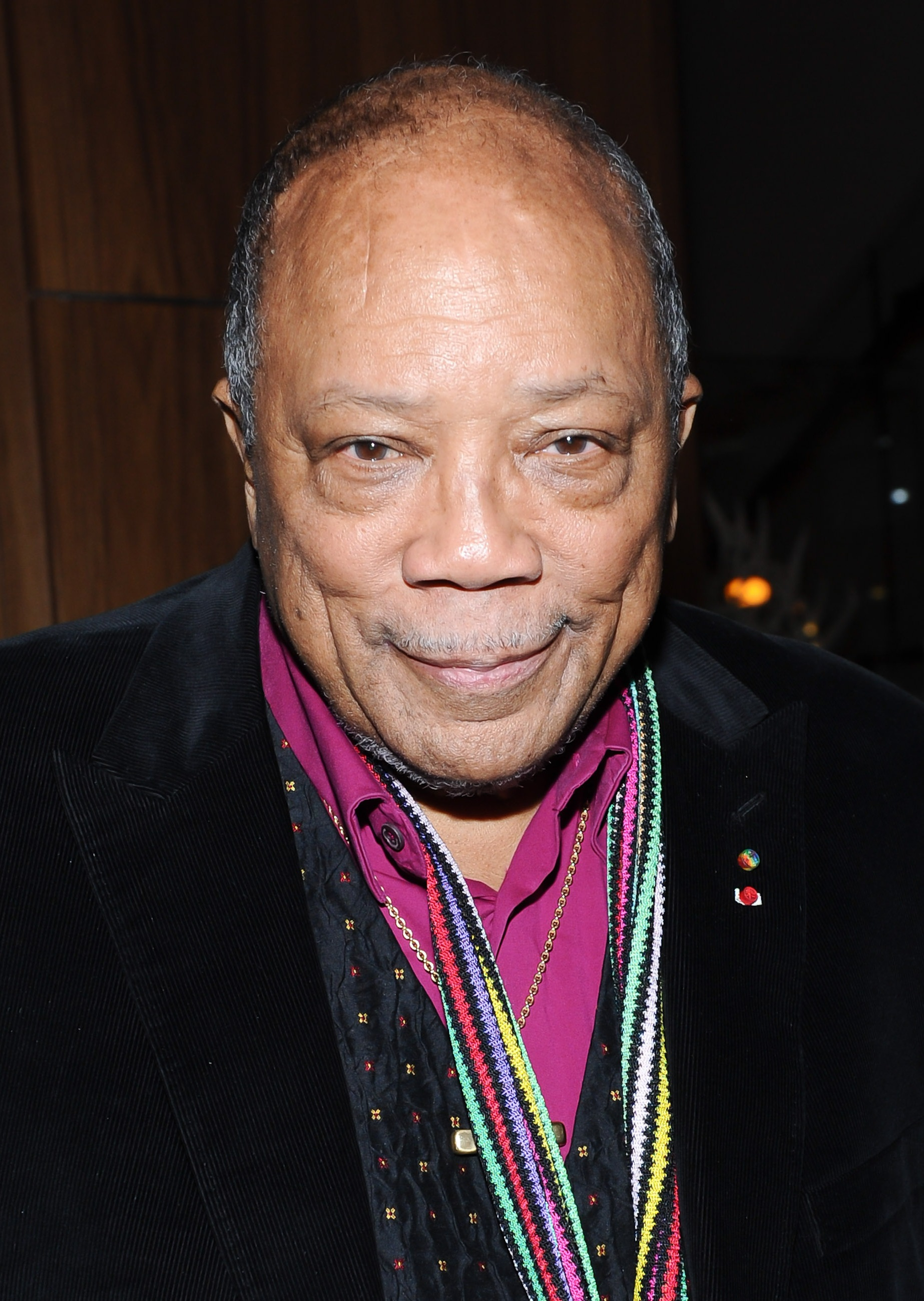
Jones in May 2014

Jones never learned to drive. At age 14, he was riding to a rodeo in Yakima in a car with a group of friends when a bus hit them. He said everybody in the car died except him; the scene was gruesome and left him traumatized. He attempted to take driving lessons a few years later but he "just couldn't do it" and never drove again.

Jones said that Ray Charles introduced him to heroin at the age of 15, and he stopped using it after five months.

He was a believer in astrology. He said in February 2018 that he believed in a God that opposes the love of money but dismissed the notion of an afterlife. He held a negative opinion of the Catholic Church, believing it is built upon the notions of money and "fear, smoke, and murder". Jones claimed to have knowledge of the truth of the John F. Kennedy assassination, stating his belief that mobster Sam Giancana was involved.

=== Legal issues ===
In October 2013, the BBC and The Hollywood Reporter said Jones planned to sue Michael Jackson's estate for $10 million. Jones said that MJJ Productions, a song company managed by Jackson's estate and Sony Music Entertainment, improperly re-edited songs to deprive him of royalties and production fees and breached an agreement giving him the right to remix master recordings for albums released after Jackson's death. The songs Jones produced for Jackson were used in the film This Is It. Jones was reported to be filing the suits against the Michael Jackson Cirque du Soleil shows and the 25th-anniversary edition of the Bad album. He believed he should have received a producer credit in the film.

=== Health issues ===
In 1974, Jones developed a life-threatening brain aneurysm, leading to a decision to reduce his workload to spend time with his friends and family. Since his family and friends believed that Jones's life was coming to an end, they started to plan a memorial service for him. He attended his own service with his neurologist by his side, in case the excitement overwhelmed him. Some of the entertainers at his service were Richard Pryor, Marvin Gaye, Sarah Vaughan, and Sidney Poitier.

Jones had two brain surgeries, and after the second was warned to never play the trumpet again, because "if he blew a trumpet in the ways that a trumpet player must, the clip [a metal plate in his head that was implanted after his brain aneurysm] would come free and he would die". He ignored that advice, went on tour in Japan, and one night after playing trumpet had a pain in his head. Doctors said the plate in his brain had nearly come loose, as they had warned, and Jones never played the trumpet again.

== Death ==
On November 3, 2024, Jones died at his home in the Bel Air neighborhood of Los Angeles at the age of 91. His publicist confirmed his death. The cause of death was not immediately disclosed, but was later revealed to be pancreatic cancer. Jones is interred at Hillside Memorial Park Cemetery in Culver City, California.

== Artistry, legacy and tributes ==
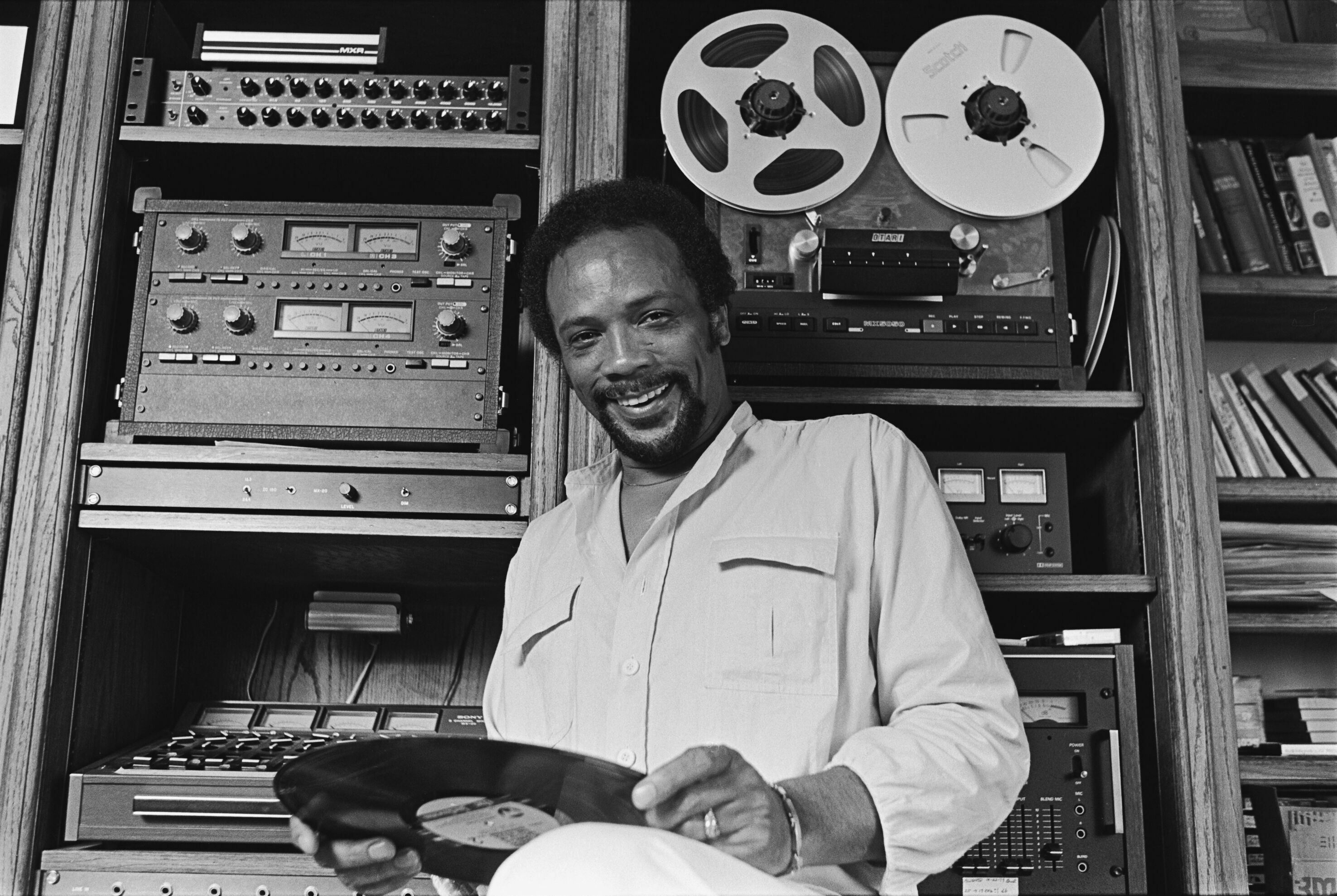
Jones at his recording studio in 1980

President Joe Biden issued a statement praising Jones as "a great unifier, who believed deeply in the healing power of music to restore hope and uplift those suffering from hunger, poverty, and violence, in America and the continent of Africa." Former president Barack Obama praised Jones for "building a career that took him from the streets of Chicago to the heights of Hollywood, Quincy paved the way for generations of Black executives to leave their mark on the entertainment business." Former president Bill Clinton stated, "He changed the face of the music industry forever." Vice President Kamala Harris called him a "trailblazer" and remembered him for his "championing of civil and human rights."

Numerous celebrities and public figures paid their tributes to Jones such as Steven Spielberg, Michael Caine, Whoopi Goldberg, Oprah Winfrey, Morgan Freeman, Lin-Manuel Miranda, Ron Howard, Francis Ford Coppola, Colman Domingo, Will Smith, Clive Davis and Berry Gordy. Several musicians that have paid tribute include Paul McCartney, BP Fallon, Elton John, Stevie Wonder, Lionel Richie, John Legend, Lenny Kravitz, Darius Rucker, Nile Rodgers, David Guetta, Kelly Rowland, Victoria Monét, Gladys Knight, Ice-T, The Weeknd, Pharrell Williams, and Russ.

Actresses Rashida and Kidada Jones shared their tributes on their father's legacy. Rashida spoke out in a statement five days after Quincy's death, in part: "My dad was nocturnal his whole adult life. He kept 'jazz hours' starting in high school and never looked back. He would smile and bring me into his arms while he continued to work. There was no safer place in the world for me. I was fortunate enough to experience this love in close proximity. Daddy, it has been an honor to be your daughter. Your love lives forever." On November 24, 2024, Kidada wrote in tribute, saying: "Music says everything words cannot. Music is the language of the heart. It's no wonder you found a home in music, Dad. Now I will know you in this new invisible way as well. Your vessel is gone, but your force is omnipresent. Molecularly, we are inseparable and so our father daughter journey continues. Thank you for showering me with love, presence, affection, wisdom, optimisim, and so much joy."

Brazilian musicians Simone, Ivan Lins, Milton Nascimento and percussionist Paulinho da Costa were close friends and partners in Jones's most recent works. Japanese film composer Joe Hisaishi came up with his alias (久石 譲, Hisaishi Jō) as a play on Jones's name.

== Awards and honors ==
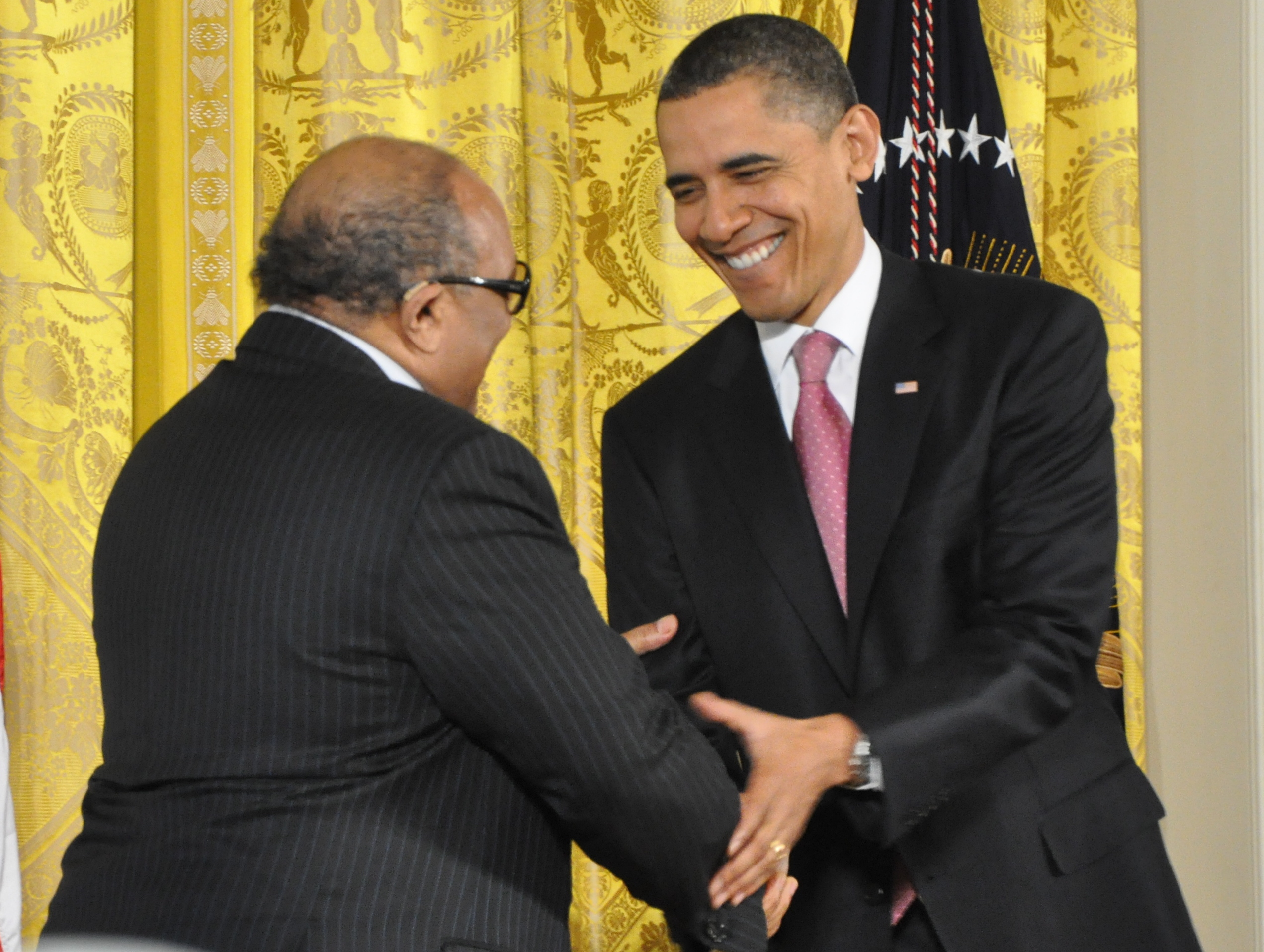
President Barack Obama presenting Jones with the National Medal of Arts, March 2011

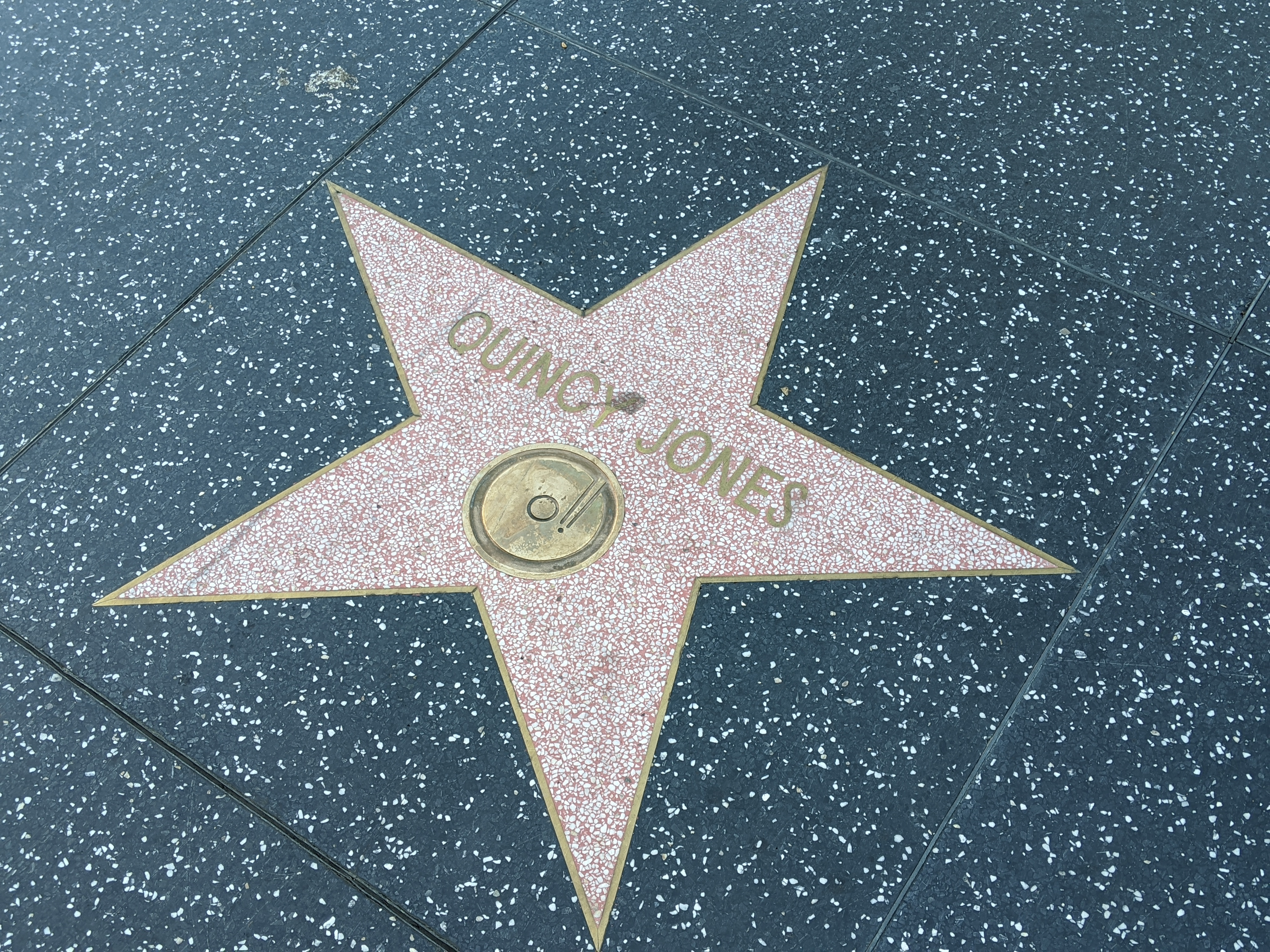
Star on the Hollywood Walk of Fame

In 1968, Jones became the first African American to be nominated for an Academy Award for Best Original Song for "The Eyes of Love" from the film Banning (1967). Jones was also nominated for an Academy Award for Best Original Score for his work on the 1967 film In Cold Blood, making him the first African American to be nominated twice in the same year. In 1971, Jones became the first African American to be the musical director and conductor of the Academy Awards. He became, in 1995, the first African American to receive the academy's Jean Hersholt Humanitarian Award. He tied with sound designer Willie D. Burton as the second most Oscar-nominated African American, with seven nominations each.

Organizations	Year	Notes	Result	Ref.
Berklee College of Music	1983	Honorary doctorate of music	Honored	
American Academy of Achievement	1984	Golden Plate Award presented by Ray Charles	Honored	
Grammy Legend Award	1992	Honorary award (part of the second class to receive it)	Honored	
Academy of Motion Picture Arts and Sciences	1995	Jean Hersholt Humanitarian Award	Honored	
Government of France	2001	Commander of the Legion of Honour	Honored	
John F. Kennedy Center for the Performing Arts	2001	Kennedy Center Honors	Honored	
Garfield High School	2008	Performing arts center is named after him	Honored	
BET Awards	2008	Humanitarian Award	Honored	
Quincy Jones Elementary School	2010	South Central Los Angeles school is named after him	Honored	
National Medal of Arts	2011	Medal bestowed on him by President Barack Obama	Honored	
Time	2013	Named as one of "The 10 Most Influential 80-Year-Olds"	Honored	
Rock and Roll Hall of Fame	2013	Ahmet Ertegun Award	Honored	
Los Angeles Press Club	2014	Visionary Award	Honored	
Government of France	2014	Grand Commandeur de Ordre des Arts et des Lettres	Honored	
Royal Academy of Music, London	2015	Honorary doctorate	Honored	
Black Music & Entertainment Walk of Fame	2021	"Foundational inductee"	Honored	
Academy of Motion Picture Arts and Sciences	2024	Academy Honorary Award	Honored	
National Rhythm and Blues Hall of Fame	2025	"Inductee"	Honored	

== Filmography ==
=== Film ===
Year	Film	Director	Credit
1964	The Pawnbroker	Sidney Lumet	Composer
1965	Mirage	Edward Dmytryk	Composer
1965	The Slender Thread	Sydney Pollack	Composer
1966	Walk, Don't Run	Charles Walters	Composer
1967	The Deadly Affair	Sidney Lumet	Composer
1967	Enter Laughing	Carl Reiner	Composer
1967	Banning	Ron Winston	Composer
1967	In the Heat of the Night	Norman Jewison	Composer
1967	In Cold Blood	Richard Brooks	Composer
1968	A Dandy in Aspic	Anthony Mann	Composer
1968	The Counterfeit Killer	Józef Lejtes	Composer
1968	Jigsaw	James Goldstone	Composer
1968	For Love of Ivy	Daniel Mann	Composer
1968	The Hell with Heroes	Joseph Sargent	Composer
1968	The Split	Gordon Flemyng	Composer
1969	Mackenna's Gold	J. Lee Thompson	Composer
1969	The Italian Job	Peter Collinson	Composer
1969	The Lost Man	Robert Alan Aurthur	Composer
1969	Bob & Carol & Ted & Alice	Paul Mazursky	Composer
1969	John and Mary	Peter Yates	Composer
1969	Cactus Flower	Gene Saks	Composer
1970	Last of the Mobile Hot Shots	Sidney Lumet	Composer
1970	The Out-of-Towners	Arthur Hiller	Composer
1970	They Call Me Mister Tibbs!	Gordon Douglas	Composer
1971	Brother John	James Goldstone	Composer
1971	The Anderson Tapes	Sidney Lumet	Composer
1971	Honky	William Graham	Composer
1971	Dollars	Richard Brooks	Composer
1972	The Hot Rock	Peter Yates	Composer
1972	The New Centurions	Richard Fleischer	Composer
1972	The Getaway	Sam Peckinpah	Composer
1978	The Wiz	Sidney Lumet	Composer
1985	The Color Purple	Steven Spielberg	Composer; Producer
1990	Stalingrad	Yuri Ozerov	Producer
1997	Steel	Kenneth Johnson	Producer
2005	Get Rich or Die Tryin'	Jim Sheridan	Composer
2023	The Color Purple	Blitz Bazawule	Producer
2024	Lola	Nicola Peltz	Composer

=== Television ===
Year	Project	Role	Notes	Ref.
1966–1967	Hey Landlord	Composer	"Hey Landlord Theme"; 7 episodes	
1967–1968	Ironside	Composer	12 episodes	
1969–1971	The Bill Cosby Show	Composer	52 episodes	
1971	The Bill Cosby Special	Composer	Comedy special	
1971	43rd Academy Awards	Musical Director	Television Special	
1972	The New Bill Cosby Show	Musical Director	2 episodes	
1973	Sanford and Son	Composer	"Sanford and Son Theme"; 135 episodes	
1977	Roots	Composer	Miniseries	
1990–1996	The Fresh Prince of Bel-Air	Executive Producer	148 episodes	
1991	The Jesse Jackson Show	Executive Producer	Episode: "The Homefront"	
1995–1999	In the House	Executive Producer	76 episodes	
1996	68th Academy Awards	Executive Producer	Television special	
1997	Lost on Earth	Executive Producer	6 episodes	
1997–1998	Vibe	Executive Producer	28 episodes	
1997–2009	Mad TV	Executive Producer	215 episodes	
2001	Say it Loud: A Celebration of Black America	Executive Producer	5 episodes	
2022	Bel-Air	Executive Producer	6 episodes	

=== Music videos ===
Year	Artist	Song	Notes
1979	Michael Jackson	"Don't Stop 'Til You Get Enough"	Producer
1979	Michael Jackson	"Rock with You"	Producer
1982	Donna Summer	"Love Is in Control (Finger on the Trigger)"	Composer
1983	Michael Jackson	"Beat It"	Producer
1985	USA for Africa	"We Are the World"	Conductor; Producer
1987	Michael Jackson	"Bad"	Producer
1988	Michael Jackson	"Man in the Mirror"	Producer
1988	Barbra Streisand & Don Johnson	"Till I Loved You"	Producer
1990	Quincy Jones	"Back on the Block"	Composer; Producer
1990	Quincy Jones	"The Secret Garden (Sweet Seduction Suite)"	Composer; Producer
1996	2Pac feat. K-Ci & JoJo	"How Do U Want It"	Composer
2001	Sheena Easton	"Love Is in Control"	Composer
2005	Ludacris	"Number One Spot"	Composer
2007	Kanye West feat. T-Pain	"Good Life"	Composer

=== Acting credits ===
Year	Film	Role	Notes	Ref.
1967	Ironside	Les Appleton	Episode: "Eat, Drink and Be Buried"	
1978	The Wiz	Emerald City Pianist	Uncredited	
1990	Listen Up: The Lives of Quincy Jones	Himself	Documentary	
1990–1993	The Fresh Prince of Bel-Air	Himself	2 episodes	
1992	The Whoopi Goldberg Show	Himself	2 episodes	
1999	Fantasia 2000	Himself	Segment: "Rhapsody in Blue"	
2002	Austin Powers in Goldmember	Himself	Cameo role	
2017	Sandy Wexler	Himself	Cameo role	
2018	Quincy	Himself	Documentary	
2019	The Black Godfather	Himself	Documentary	
2020	Jay Sebring....Cutting to the Truth	Himself	Documentary	

=== Theatre ===
Year	Project	Role	Venue	Ref.
2005	The Color Purple	Producer	Broadway Theatre, Broadway debut	
2015	The Color Purple	Producer	Bernard B. Jacobs Theater, Broadway revival	
