= Oscar DeGruy =

American actor

Oscar DeGruy (born 1950) is an American actor who has appeared in over a dozen films and TV shows over 30 years, started the Baháʼí Youth Workshop performance model in 1974, and has assisted hip hop artists. He is the brother of popular psychologist Dr. Joy DeGruy and one of four children born to working class parents, Oscar DeGruy Sr., a truck driver and Nellie Parker DeGruy, a stay-at-home mom.

== Acting career ==
DeGruy was a regular on The New Bill Cosby Show for the 1972–1973 season and appeared in shows as diverse as Room 222 to Hill Street Blues. His first role was on The Young Lawyers in 1970, and in 2008 he completed work as a supporting actor in Zero Option, based on a true story.

In Good Times in 1974 Degruy was featured in a two-part episode "JJ and the Gang". JJ is forced into a gang led by Mad Dog (DeGruy), who wounds JJ. After the trial Mad Dog is confronted by his mother, who confesses "I never thought I could feel this way about my child, but I hate you. Sometimes I wish you were never born," and the two exchange emotional arguments over the missing husband/father. JJ's father, James, ultimately feels sympathy for Mad Dog witnessing the family argument over the absent father.

== Baháʼí Youth Workshops ==
A former member of the Black Panthers DeGruy changed his approach to racism issues and "had to do something" – so he and his wife brought performing arts theater with performance arts of step dance and street dancing together with the Baháʼí principles of equality, racial harmony and unity of religions. In 1982 DeGruy was joined by Juliet Soopikian and together they co-wrote the workshops's manual in 1987. In 1995 there were over 100 Workshops in the United States and another 100 scattered across 50 other countries. Over 1000 such Workshops have formed over the years some of which have toured internationally.

There are several standard performances that are part of the Workshop's manual – one is the "Racism Dance." Two young members from oppositely styled groups (by clothing colors or other visual cues) come together in the middle of the "stage" and start to become friendly. They are then theatrically dragged back to their "own" groups by the blindfolded adults, who communicate through gestures their mistrust of and hatred for the other group, and the central players are given blindfolds to wear of their own. In the dramatic climax, however, the young ones shed their blindfolds, return to center stage, and demonstrate the races can unite. At the end, their example leads everyone to remove their blindfolds and come together in a final joyous dance sequence.

In 1995 a select group of six young women formed a workshop to perform at the NGO Forum on Women in China, parallel to the UN Fourth World Conference on Women and performed five times. They were selected to perform in the closing ceremony, before some 15,000 people two pieces – "a dance on domestic violence showing women as peacemakers, and a rap on the nobility and dignity of women, showing and the importance of women and men working in partnership."

== See also ==
Stepping (African-American)
