= The Color Purple (1985 soundtrack) =

The Color Purple: Music From the Motion Picture

Soundtrack album by Quincy Jones
- Released: 1985
- Recorded: 1985 (unless otherwise noted)
- Length: 79:06
- Label: Qwest
- Producer: Quincy Jones

Singles from The Color Purple
- 1. "Miss Celie's Blues" Released: December 1985

The Color Purple: Music From the Motion Picture is the soundtrack album to the 1985 film of the same name. The soundtrack was produced by Quincy Jones Productions and released in 1985 by Qwest Records.

The score of the film combines elements of classical and period jazz, blues, and gospel, and features popular songs of the 1920s."Miss Celie's Blues (Sister)" by Táta Vega, which was released as a single, was composed in a blues/ragtime style.

For the stage musical, and the 2023 musical film of the same name, an entirely new soundtrack was produced, one which bears little resemblance to the original.

== Critical reception and accolades ==
Professional ratings
Review scores
Source	Rating
AllMusic	4.5/5 stars

The soundtrack to the Color Purple garnered positive reviews from music critics. It was praised for its production and Táta Vega's vocal performance. The song, "Miss Celie's Blues (Sister)", is sung by the character Shug Avery, played by Margaret Avery in the film but whose singing voice is dubbed by Vega.

Music from the film was nominated for two Academy Awards: Best Original Score and Best Original Song. The soundtrack peaked at number 55 on the Billboard Top R&B Albums chart.

== Track List ==
=== Disc One ===
#	Title	Writer/s	Length	Conductor	Notes
1	"Overture"	Quincy Jones	7:56	Tom Bahler	Medley*
2	"Main Title"	Q. Jones, Jeremy Lubbock, Joel Rosenbaum, Rod Temperton	2:00	Joel Rosenbaum	
3	"Celie Leaves With Mr."	Jack Hayes, Q. Jones	3:22	Jack Hayes	
4	"Corrine and Olivia"	Q. Jones, J. Rosenbaum	3:06	Joel Rosenbaum	
5	"Nettie Teaches Celie"	J. Hayes, Q. Jones, J. Lubbock, R. Temperton	4:20	Jack Hayes	
6	"The Separation"	Jorge Calandrelli, Q. Jones, J. Lubbock, R. Temperton	2:53	Richard Hazard	
7	"Celie and Harpo Grow Up/Mr. Dresses To See Shug"	J. Hayes, Q. Jones, J. Lubbock, R. Temperton	2:43	Richard Hazard	
8	"Careless Love"	Traditional	0:56	Sammy Nestico	Vocals: Táta Vega
9	"Sophia Leaves Harpo"	Q. Jones, J. Lubbock, R. Temperton	2:39	Nathan Scott	
10	"Celie Cooks Shug Breakfast"	Q. Jones, Fred Steiner	1:24	Fred Steiner	
11	"Junk Bucket Blues"	Porter Grainger	1:48		Recorded in 1925 by the Get Happy Band
12	"The Dirty Dozens"	Rufus Perryman, J. Mayo Williams	3:13	Quincy Jones	Vocals: Táta Vega
13	"Miss Celie's Blues"	Q. Jones, Lionel Richie, R. Temperton	2:29	Quincy Jones	Vocals: Táta Vega
14	"Don't Make Me No Never Mind"	Roy Gaines, James Ingram, Q. Jones	3:05	Quincy Jones	Vocals: John Lee Hooker
15	"My Heart (Will Always Lead Me Back To You)"	Lil Hardin Armstrong, Louis Armstrong	1:37		Recorded in 1925 by Louis Armstrong and His Hot Five
16	"Three On The Road"	Q. Jones, L. Richie, R. Temperton	0:25	Quincy Jones	
17	"Bus Pulls Out"	Q. Jones, L. Richie, R. Temperton	0:48	Jerry Hey	

- The Overture is a medley of: "Miss Celie's Blues", "Celie Leaves with Mr.", "Celie Cooks Shug Breakfast", "Nettie Teaches Celie",
  "Sophia's Walk", "Makidada", "Champagne Train", "Mailbox", and "Proud Theme" .
- "Sophia's Walk" was composed by Jerry Hey, Quincy Jones and Randy Kerber. "Makidada" was composed by Quincy Jones,
  Menno Meyjes and Rod Temperton. "Mailbox" was composed by Quincy Jones.

=== Disc 2 ===
#	Title	Writer/s	Length	Conductor	Notes
1	"The First Letter"	J. Calandrelli, Q. Jones, J. Lubbock, J. Rosenbaum, R. Temperton	5:04	Richard Hazard	
2	"Letter Search"	Q. Jones, J. Lubbock, J. Rosenbaum, R. Temperton	3:08	Joel Rosenbaum	
3	"Nettie's Letters"	Q. Jones, J. Lubbock, J. Rosenbaum, R. Temperton	0:59	Joel Rosenbaum	
4	"High Life/Proud Theme "	Traditional	1:08	Joel Rosenbaum	
5	"J.B. King "	Traditional	0:38	Joel Rosenbaum	
6	"Heaven Belongs to You"	Andraé Crouch, Sandra Crouch	1:02	Andraé Crouch	
7	"Katutoka Corrine"	Caiphus Semenya	1:01	Caiphus Semenya	Vocals: Letta Mbulu & The Christ; Memorial Church Choir
8	"Celie Shaves Mr./Scarification Ceremony"	Caiphus Semenya	3:13	Caiphus Semenya	Vocals: The Christ Memorial Church Choir
9	"I'm Here"	Chris Boardman, Q. Jones, J. Lubbock, R. Temperton	1:51	Chris Boardman	
10	"Champagne Train"	C. Boardman, Q. Jones, J. Lubbock, R. Temperton	2:36	Chris Boardman	
11	"Celie's New House"	Q. Jones, J. Lubbock, J. Rosenbaum, R. Temperton	2:03	Richard Hazard	Vocals: The Christ Memorial Church Choir
12	"Body and Soul"	Johnny Green, Edward Heyman, Robert Sour	2:10		Recorded in 1939 by Coleman Hawkins & His Orchestra
13	"Maybe God Is Tryin' to Tell You Somethin'"	A. Crouch, David Del Sesto, Q. Jones, Bill Maxwell	4:38		Vocals: Jacqueline Farris, Táta Vega, The Christ Memorial Church Choir
14	"Reunion/Finale"	J. Hayes, Q. Jones, J. Lubbock, R. Temperton	4:37	Jack Hayes	

== Personnel ==
=== Disc 1 ===
- Guitar: Dennis Budimir, Roy Gaines, Paul Jackson Jr.,
- Mandolin: Ry Cooder
- Keyboards: Greg Phillinganes, Bobby Scott
- Drums: Harvey Mason
- Percussion: Roy Gaines, Steven Spielberg
- Saxophone – Jerome Richardson
- Clarinet: Marshal Royal
- Harmonica: Sonny Terry
- Trombone: George Bohanon
- Trumpet: Snooky Young
- Double Bass: Red Callender
- The Get Happy Band: Piano: Porter Granger, Mike Jackson. Banjo: Elmer Snowden, Sam Speed. Saxophone: Sidney Bechet, Bob Fuller.
  Trombone: Tricky Sam Nanton. Cornet: Thomas Morris. Trumpet: Johnny Dunn
- Louis Armstrong & His Hot Five: Piano: Lil Hardin Armstrong. Banjo: Johnny St. Cyr. Clarinet: Johnny Dodds.
  Trombone: Kid Ory. Cornet: Louis Armstong

=== Disc 2 ===
- Guitar: Tony Phillips
- Drums: Bill Maxwell
- Percussion: Harvey Mason, Bill Maxwell, Bill Summers
- Saxophone: Benny Golson
- Clarinet: Ernie Watts
- Trombone: Al Grey
- Trumpet: Snooky Young
- Double Bass: David Stone
- Violin: William Howard Armstrong
- Coleman Hawkins And His Orchestra: Piano: Gene Rodgers. Drums: Arthur Herbert. Saxophone: Jackie Fields, Coleman Hawkins, Eustis Moore.
  Trombone: Earl Hardy. Trumpet: Joe Guy, Tommy Lindsay . Double Bass: William Oscar Smith

=== Orchestra ===
- Guitar: George Doering, John Goux, Dan Sawyer
- Keyboards: Ralph Grierson, Craig Huxley, Mike Lang, Lincoln Mayorga, Alan Pasqua, Randy Waldman
- Percussion: Larry Bunker, Paulinho Da Costa, Alan Estes, Victor Feldman, Peter Limonick, Joe Porcaro, Tom Raney, Emil Richards, Dave Shank, Nyle Steiner
- Harmonica: Tommy Morgan
- Saxophone: Jack Nimitz
- Clarinet: Roy D'Antonio, Dominick Fera, Jim Kanter, David Sherr, Julian Spear, Ralph Williams
- Flute: Louise DiTullio, Paul Freid, Hubert Laws, Sarah Orme, Gerry Rotell, David Shostac, Sheridon Stokes, Jim Walker
- Bassoon: Jack Marsh, Ken Munday, Michael O'Donovan, Dave Riddles, John Steinmetz, Bob Tricarico
- Oboe: Tom Boyd, Gene Cipriano, Earl Dumler, Arnold Koblentz, Jan Winter
- French Horn: Jim Atkinson, Vincent DeRosa, Dave Duke, Steven Durnin, Marni Johnson, Art Maebe, Diane Muller, Richard Perissi, Henry Sigismonti, James Thatcher,
  Richard Todd, Brad Warnaar
- Trumpet: Oscar Brashear, Mario Guarneri
- Trombone: Alan Kaplan, Bill Reichenbach Jr., Phil Teele
- Tuba: Roger Bobo, Thomas Johnson, Jim Self
- Double Bass: Ann Atkinson, Jimmy Bond, Drew Dembowski, Chuck Domanico, Steve La Fever, Edward Meares, Bruce Morgenthaler, Buell Neidlinger, Sue Raney
- Cello: Bob Adock, Ron Cooper, Marie Fera, Barbara Hunter, Armand Kaproff, Anne Karam, Ray Kelley, Armen Ksajikian, Dane Little, Earl Madison, Miguel Martinez,
  Becky Reese, Daniel Rothmuller, Frederick Seykora, Tina Soule, Nancy Stein
- Harp: Catherine Gotthoffer, Gayle Levant, Dorothy Remsen, Ann Stockton
- Viola: Denyse Buffum, Ken Burward-Hoy, Rollice Dale, Alan de Veritch, Pam Goldsmith, Allan Harshman, Janet Kakatos, Roland Kato, Myra Kestenbaum,
  Carrie Holzman Little, Linda Lipsett, Virginia Majewski, Donald McInnes, Carole Mukogawa, Robert Ostrowsky, Kazi Pitelki, Dave Schwartz, Linn Subotnick,
  Milton Thomas, Ray Tischer, Herschel Wise, Larry Woods
- Violin: Israel Baker, Thelma Beach, Arnold Belnick, Dixie Blackstone, Mari Botnick, Al Bruenig, Darius Campo, Stuart Canin, Norm Carr, Oscar Chausow, Ron Clark,
  Herman Clebanoff, Bonnie Douglas, Assa Drori, Bruce Dukov, David Frisina, Rick Gerding, James Getzoff, Harry Goldman, Ed Green, Clayton Haslop, Bill Hybel,
  William Hymanson, Davida Jackson, Karen Jones, Anatol Kaminsky, Kathi Lenski, Brian Leonard, Jay Lyle, Mike Markman, Betty Moore, Ralph Morrison, Irma Neumann,
  Don Palmer, Barbara Porter, Debbie Price, Jay Rosen, Sheldon Sanov, Haim Shtrum, Paul Shure, Jerry Vinci
