= The New Bill Cosby Show =

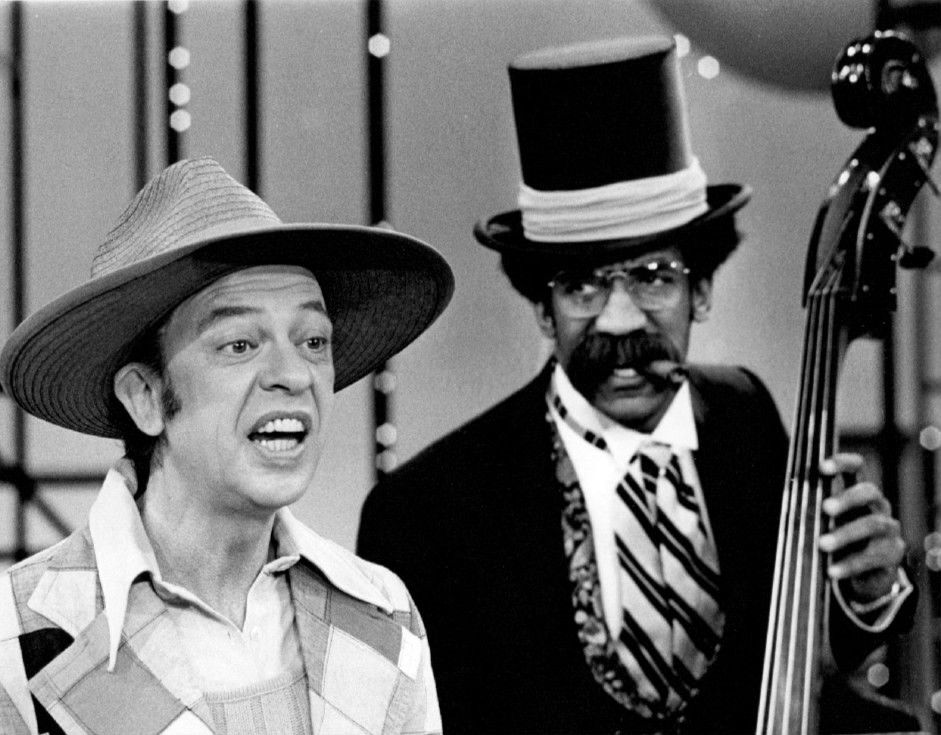
- Guest star Don Knotts sings while Cosby provides the music in a skit from the show in 1973.
- Genre: Variety
- Starring: Bill Cosby; Lola Falana; Susan Tolsky; Foster Brooks; Oscar DeGruy; Pat McCormick; Ronny Graham; Ray Jessel

Production
- Producer: George Schlatter

Original release
- Release: September 11, 1972 – May 7, 1973

The New Bill Cosby Show is an American variety television series aired in the United States by CBS as part of its 1972–73 lineup.

== Overview ==
The New Bill Cosby Show was an attempt to exploit the widespread popularity of Bill Cosby, who had previously starred in an eponymous sitcom and the drama (with comedic undertones) I Spy and who had been responsible for several of the best-selling comedy albums of the 1960s. Cosby's supporting cast was biracial, highlighted by Foster Brooks of "funny-drunk" routine fame and also included performer Lola Falana, who additionally served as the show's announcer, and other persons previously best known as comedy writers, including Ronny Graham and Pat McCormick. Quincy Jones' orchestra provided the music. Ongoing sketches included "The Wife of the Week" and the adventures of "The Dude", a man who was so impossibly cool that nothing whatever could faze him or cause him in any way to lose his composure or coolness.

The opening theme was "Chump Change" by Quincy Jones.

== Reception ==
The show was met with low ratings, due to competition from ABC's Monday Night Football and NBC Monday Night at the Movies, and was cancelled after one season.

For his performance in the series, Cosby received a 1973 Golden Globe nomination for Best Actor in a Television Series - Musical or Comedy.
