= Susan Tolsky =

American actress (1943–2022)

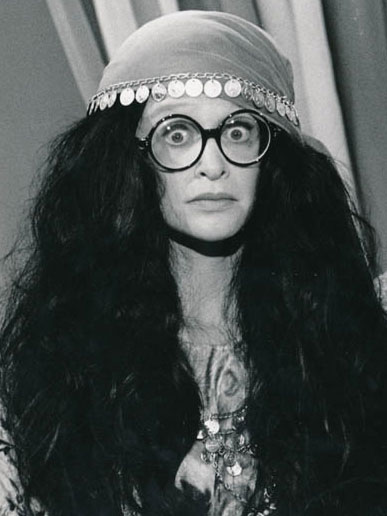
- Tolsky in costume on The New Bill Cosby Show, c. 1973
- Born: Susan Gaye Tolsky; April 6, 1943; Houston, Texas, U.S
- Died: October 9, 2022 (aged 79); Los Angeles, California, U.S.
- Education: Bellaire High School
- Alma mater: University of Texas at Austin
- Occupation: Actress
- Years active: 1968–2006

Susan Gaye Tolsky (April 6, 1943 – October 9, 2022) was an American actress. Born and raised in Houston, Texas, Tolsky began acting in high school and later studied nursing at the University of Texas at Austin before switching her major to theater. In 1967, she relocated to Hollywood and made her television debut on the sitcom The Second Hundred Years. Within a year, she earned a main role on the ABC comedy Western series Here Come the Brides (1968–1970) as Biddie Cloom.

A self-described character actress, Tolsky made her film debut in Pretty Maids All in a Row (1971) and gained wider recognition as a regular on the variety series The New Bill Cosby Show (1972–1973) on CBS. Following several guest roles on television throughout the 1970s, Tolsky was part of the main cast on the syndicated sitcom Madame's Place (1982–1983) in the role of Bernadette Van Gilder. Her film credits include supporting roles in Charley and the Angel (1973), Record City (1977), and How to Beat the High Cost of Living (1980).

Tolsky ventured into voice acting in the 1980s, beginning with Annabell on Hanna-Barbera's animated series Foofur (1986–1988). She continued her career in voice-over in the next decade with recurring roles as Aunt Ruth on Bobby's World (1990–1998), Binkie Muddlefoot on Darkwing Duck (1991–1992), and Aunt Janie on Pepper Ann (1997–2000). She also provided guest voice roles on a number of Disney Television Animation productions. Tolsky's final credit is the Disney Channel animated comedy series The Buzz on Maggie (2005–2006), where she voiced Mrs. Pesky.

== Early life and education ==
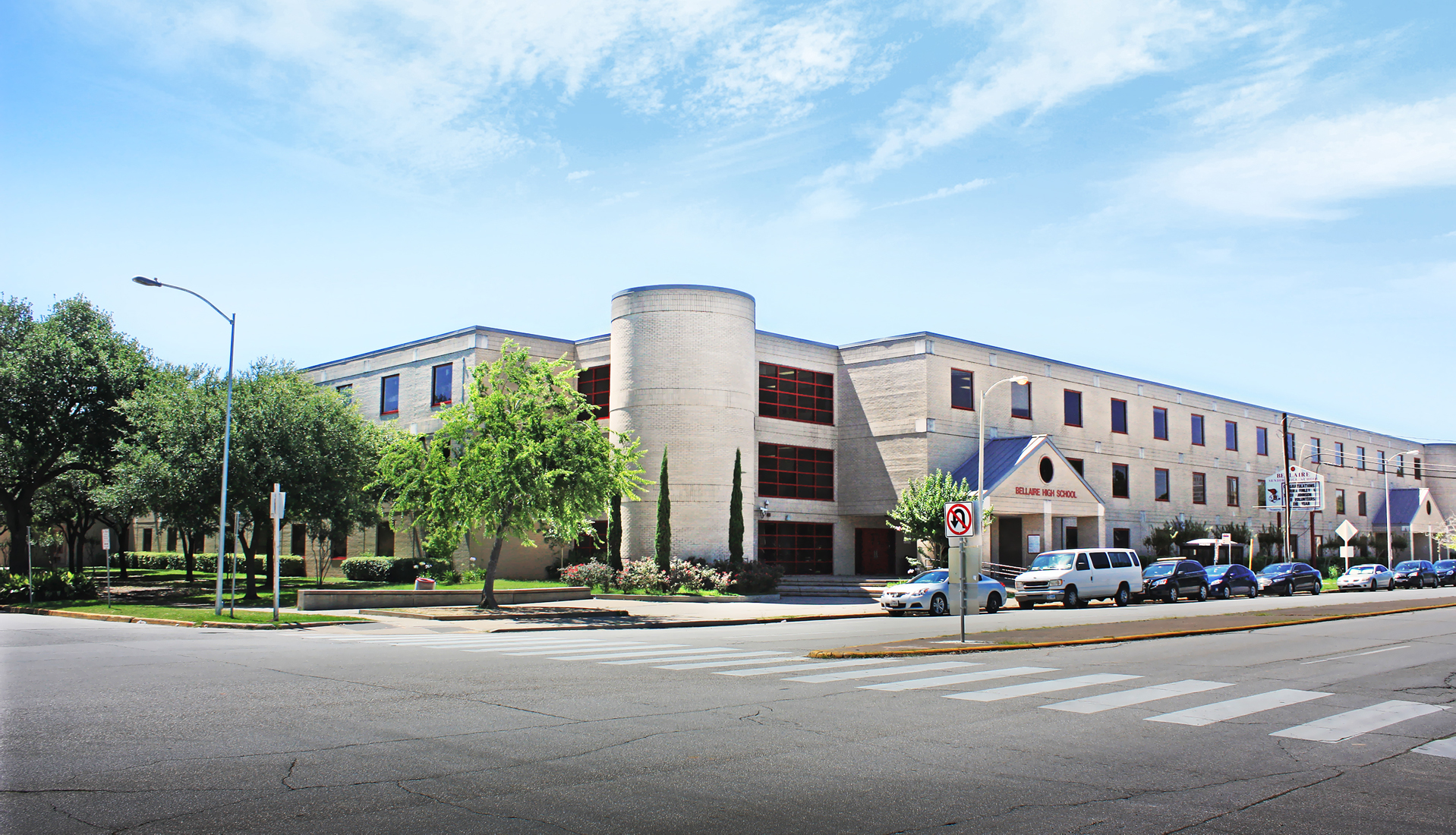
Bellaire High School, where Tolsky first started acting

Susan Gaye Tolsky was born on April 6, 1943, in Houston, Texas, to shop owners Sarah (née Hartstein) and Abe Tolsky. She was of Russian Jewish descent. She had one older sister, Noel. Tolsky became interested in comedy at a young age. At age eight, she performed a one-woman show at slumber parties in her neighborhood.

She attended Bellaire High School, where she grew fond of acting and stand-up comedy. She credited her high school drama teacher as her "best influence". As a child, she also had a fascination with the field of medicine and read Gray's Anatomy at age ten. She started volunteering in hospitals at age 15. When her father advised her not to pursue a career in acting, she enrolled at the University of Texas at Austin to major in nursing.

While in college, Tolsky worked as a nurse's aide in the Texas Medical Center after school and on weekends. She took care of children at Houston Methodist Hospital and Texas Children's Hospital until officials believed she "could work anywhere" in the medical center. She then began working as a medical technician and was involved in obstetrics and gynecology. Despite her initial plans to acquire a degree in medicine and become a doctor, she quit during her second year of pre-medical. She said, "I quit because of the battle within me. I believe in euthanasia and could not truly shake it from my mind." As "the lure of acting proved strong", she transferred to the Department of Drama and switched her major to theater and English. She recalled:

I had two loves. I loved medicine and I loved drama. I was working in hospitals when I was fifteen. I started out in medicine for two years, then I switched to drama. It was a very difficult decision. [Particularly since] a lot of girls in those days didn't have an aim, except maybe to get married and have babies. I don't regret my choice or anything.

At university, she regularly appeared in school plays, stating that she "acted [her] head off in everything from Greek tragedy to musical comedy". In her senior year, talent scout and casting director Eddie Foy III visited on behalf of the New Talent Program at Screen Gems, and Tolsky auditioned in a scene from Barefoot in the Park. Foy advised her to try acting in Hollywood, where she later moved after graduating with a degree in the fine arts in 1967. She shared an apartment in Hollywood with actress Susan Howard. Tolsky frequently visited wholesalers in Los Angeles as a buyer for her parents' shop in Houston.

== Acting career ==
=== 1968–1970: Early roles and Here Come the Brides ===
When Tolsky arrived in Hollywood, Foy was unable to grant her a contract with Screen Gems, and instead introduced her to people who worked in casting and helped her get an agent. Foy let her join the New Talent Program without being under contract, which allowed her to read new scripts. In 1968, Tolsky made her television debut on an episode of The Second Hundred Years, where she had one line, followed by a small role on an episode of Bewitched, both on ABC. During this time, she worked with the Columbia Pictures Workshop and the Los Angeles Repertory Company to find extra work.

In 1968, Howard, a contract actress at Screen Gems, brought home a script for the pilot episode of the comedy Western series Here Come the Brides. The plot was loosely based on the Mercer Girls, women who moved from the East Coast of the United States to Seattle, Washington, in the 1860s. Howard believed Tolsky was perfect for the role of Biddie Cloom. Foy was less enthused of her chances of securing the part, believing she could not play a character from Massachusetts due to her Southern accent. In January 1968, Tolsky read for the part after convincing Foy, and she recalled that the audition was "awful", stating that she was a "nervous wreck". Two weeks later, she landed the role. Written as a minor character, Tolsky had "like three, or four lines" in the pilot episode. She initially struggled with the New England accent, which amused her colleagues.

The studio tested the pilot of Here Come the Brides with a test audience and Biddie was well received. Screen Gems then wanted her to sign a contract with the studio, but because they did not offer her a contract from the beginning, she declined. She recalled, "I said, 'I want a contract just to do the show,' because I knew they could have done that when I first came out. They didn't do it, so I said, 'No.'" She then fired her agent who advised her to sign the contract with Screen Gems, and hired a manager. Tolsky chose not to sign a long-term contract with the studio as she knew that "all too often they mean seven years of forced labor in the wrong roles". A few weeks later, she was given a contract for Here Come the Brides as a series regular. The series aired from September 1968 to April 1970, running for two seasons on ABC. In the second season, the character Biddie received "more attention" and "Biddie's Theme" was composed. Tolsky recalled, "The second year they gave me a little more latitude – the dimension of my character ... When you see Biddie walking, she has her own theme, and I was enormously honored by that because I was not in the regular cast – I came in on a fluke."

=== 1971–1979: Film debut and The New Bill Cosby Show ===
Tolsky made her film debut in Roger Vadim's comedy-mystery film Pretty Maids All in a Row (1971) as Miss Craymire, the secretary of Rock Hudson's character. The film received generally negative reviews in the press, and was described as a "sex satire-murder mystery". After watching the final product at a preview, Tolsky told Vadim, "Now I know why I'm the only girl in the movie who didn't get asked to take off her clothes." Tolsky was slated to appear in Dirty Little Billy (1972) as the Texan girlfriend of Michael J. Pollard's title character, but the plans fell through. In 1972, Tolsky guest starred on the season four finale of the CBS sitcom Here's Lucy, starring Lucille Ball and her daughter Lucie Arnaz. The episode was a backdoor pilot for a proposed spin-off starring Arnaz. Tolsky was one of three finalists for the role of Arnaz's friend Sue Ann Ditbenner, and she landed the role after reading for the part at Ball's home. The spin-off was ultimately not picked up by the network. Tolsky then guest starred as another character, Miss Quigley, on a season five episode of Here's Lucy.

In the early 1970s, Tolsky regularly appeared as a guest on talk shows hosted by Merv Griffin and Virginia Graham. Following an appearance on The Merv Griffin Show, producer George Schlatter took notice of her and enlisted her for the main cast of The New Bill Cosby Show (1972–73), a variety series hosted by Bill Cosby on CBS. The cast portrayed themselves and different characters in sketches. Cosby told the New York Daily News that he "fought and won a battle" with the network to not establish Tolsky's character as a "dumb dame". In an interview prior to the series premiere, he stated, "Susan will be smart but different. She won't be a nasal sounding dumb person as they wanted to make her." The variety series premiered in September 1972 and was canceled after one season. The series was met with mixed reactions from critics, although Tolsky's performance was better received.

Tolsky's next film credit was Charley and the Angel (1973), a Disney comedy film directed by Vincent McEveety, in which she portrayed the character Miss Partridge. While reviewing the film, the Austin American-Statesman's Marjorie Hoffman wrote that Tolsky "has a few good scenes as a self-admiring spinster". From 1972 to 1973, Tolsky acted on two episodes of ABC's anthology television series Love, American Style. She was a contestant on the ABC game show The Dating Game in September 1973, and appeared as a celebrity guest on the game show Showoffs for a week in August 1975. In the later part of the decade, she acted in the comedy film Record City (1977) and Stan Dragoti's comedy horror film Love at First Bite (1979). Tolsky starred in the television pilot Front Page Feeney with Don Knotts, which aired in syndication in August 1977. She also made episodic appearances on the drama series Quincy, M.E. (1977) and Fantasy Island (1978), and portrayed Mammy Yokum in a Li'l Abner television special, the musical film Li'l Abner in Dogpatch Today (1978).

=== 1980–2006: Madame's Place and voice acting ===
In the 1980s, Tolsky appeared on four episodes of the CBS sitcom Alice, portraying different one-time characters, from 1980 to 1983. She appeared in the films How to Beat the High Cost of Living (1980), directed by Robert Scheerer, and The Devil and Max Devlin (1981), directed by Steven Hilliard Stern. She also guest starred on two episodes of the ABC sitcom Barney Miller in 1981 and 1982, for which the scripts were not finished at the time of filming. Tolsky said, "We went there, and they would bring down like two pages and then they'd be 'Okay, everybody have a break and we'll come down with some more pages.'" She said the cast and crew were "wonderful", and that the experience as a whole was "joyous" even if they had to wait for the scripts to be finished. She also guest starred on an episode of the crime drama series Matt Houston in 1982.

Tolsky earned her third main role on television on Madame's Place (1982–83), a comedy series about a puppet, controlled by Wayland Flowers, named Madame who hosts a late-night talk show from her mansion. Tolsky portrayed Bernadette Van Gilder, Madame's shy secretary. The series was well received by television critics and viewers alike. Madame's Place had a very rushed shooting schedule and aired five days a week in first-run syndication. According to Tolsky, 75 episodes were shot in a span of fifteen weeks, and she considered it one of her "most enjoyable" experiences, after Here Come the Brides. She said, "We had a fabulous crew on that ... We did a show a day, so we did have a close crew." She felt that pleasant experiences on set became "less and less common by the 1980s"; she recalled, "The fifties and sixties and seventies – that was a wonderful era." For the remainder of the decade, Tolsky had few roles; she appeared in the comedy crime film The Longshot in 1986, and had a guest role on an episode of the sitcom Webster in 1988.

After her guest appearance on Webster, Tolsky's acting credits only consisted of voice roles in animation. She first became involved in voice acting on the NBC animated children's television series Foofur (1986–88), where she voiced Annabell. In the 1990s, she lent her voice to several animated television series; she had recurring roles as Aunt Ruth on Bobby's World (1990–98), Binkie Muddlefoot on Darkwing Duck (1991–92), Scara on Aladdin (1994), and Aunt Janie, the aunt of the titular character on Pepper Ann (1997–2000). She also voiced characters in single episodes of several Disney Television Animation productions, including TaleSpin (1991), Goof Troop (1992), and Jungle Cubs (1996). Tolsky's final credit is the Disney Channel animated comedy series The Buzz on Maggie (2005–06), where she was part of the main cast. She provided the voice of Mrs. Pesky, the mother of the title character. The series premiered in June 2005 to a positive response from television critics, who praised its humor, voice acting, and writing. The Buzz on Maggie was canceled after one season, airing its final episode in May 2006.

== Personal life and death ==
Tolsky dated actor Christopher Stone, whom she met through the New Talent Program at Screen Gems in the late 1960s, for five years. Tolsky's interest in medicine remained after quitting pre-medical. She continued to read medical dictionaries and her social circle consisted of people working in the field. While visiting friends in hospitals, she had "this fantasy and make believe" the speaker operator would call for "Dr. Tolsky". She also had an interest in cooking, which she described as her "special thing". Her recipe for one-layer chocolate cake appeared in the Valley News and Green Sheet in February 1970. In the 1970s, Tolsky resided in Sherman Oaks in the San Fernando Valley.

Tolsky rarely watched her own work, asserting that it was "quite frightening" for her. She considered herself a character actress as she realized at a young age that she was "one of those girls who had a good personality". She said, "I really wasn't what you'd call 'beautiful' ... I realized quite young that if I made people laugh, I could go anywhere." In an interview in 2007, she said that she still received fan mail because of Here Come the Brides. She stated, "It's shocking that people still remember that show ... They come up and they go, 'You're Biddie.' I'm honored that people remember things like that."

Tolsky died of natural causes at her Toluca Lake home in Los Angeles on October 9, 2022, at the age of 79.

== Filmography ==
=== Film ===
Year	Title	Role
1971	Pretty Maids All in a Row	Miss Harriet Craymire
1973	Charley and the Angel	Miss Partridge
1977	Record City	Goldie
1979	Love at First Bite	Model Agent
1980	How to Beat the High Cost of Living	Patty
1981	The Devil and Max Devlin	Nerve's Mom
1986	The Longshot	Dee

=== Television ===
Year	Title	Role	Notes
1968	The Second Hundred Years	WAC Sergeant	Episode: "For Whom the Drums Beat"
1968	Bewitched	Secretary	Episode: "The No-Harm Charm"
1968–70	Here Come the Brides	Biddie Cloom	Main role
1972	Here's Lucy	Sue Ann Ditbenner / Miss Quigley	2 episodes
1972–73	Love, American Style	Vanessa / Caroline	2 episodes
1972–73	The New Bill Cosby Show	Various	Main role
1973	The Dating Game	Herself	1 episode
1975	Showoffs	Herself	5 episodes
1977	Front Page Feeney	Babs Lovelace	Television pilot
1977	Quincy, M.E.	Toxicology Chemist	Episode: "No Deadly Secret"
1978	Fantasy Island	Penny	Episode: "Voodoo/Family Reunion"
1978	Li'l Abner in Dogpatch Today	Mammy Yokum	Television film
1979	The Three Wives of David Wheeler	—N/a	Television pilot
1980	Once Upon a Family	Gail Unger	Television film
1980–83	Alice	Miss Gafney / Female Customer #1 / Nurse / Penny	4 episodes
1981–82	Barney Miller	Wendy / Hofflein	2 episodes
1982–83	Madame's Place	Bernadette Van Gilder	Main role
1982	Matt Houston	Bernice	Episode: "The Good Doctor"
1986–88	Foofur	Annabell (voice)	Main role
1987	The Smurfs	Additional voices	Episode: "Smurf on the Wild Side"
1988	Webster	Kitty	Episode: "The Cuckoo's Nest"
1989	Fantastic Max	Additional voices	Episode: "Boo Who?"
1990–98	Bobby's World	Aunt Ruth (voice)	Recurring role
1990	Bill & Ted's Excellent Adventures	Additional voices	Recurring role
1991	TaleSpin	Mrs. Morrissey (voice)	Episode: "Sheepskin Deep"
1991–92	Darkwing Duck	Binkie Muddlefoot (voice)	Recurring role
1992	Goof Troop	Miss Pennypacker (voice)	Episode: "Date with Destiny"
1994	Aladdin	Scara (voice)	2 episodes
1996	The Spooktacular New Adventures of Casper	Librarian (voice)	Episode: "Paws/The Alphabet Song/Is So Too"
1996	Cave Kids	Piecemaker (voice)	Episode: "China Challenge"
1996	Jungle Cubs	Clarisse (voice)	Episode: "Benny & Clyde/Feather Brains"
1996	The Story of Santa Claus	Additional voices	Television film
1997	101 Dalmatians: The Series	Peeps' mother (voice)	Episode: "Rolly's Egg-Celent Adventure/Wild Chick Chase"
1997–2000	Pepper Ann	Aunt Janie (voice)	Recurring role
1998	Hercules	Teacher (voice)	Episode: "Hercules and the Kids"
1999	Cow and Chicken	Pea Hen / Betsy Ross (voice)	Episode: "Cloud Nine/Revolutionary Weasel/Send in the Clowns"
2000	Recess	Woman (voice)	Episode: "Old Folks Home/Some Friend"
2001	Teacher's Pet	Animal shelter employee (voice)	Episode: "A Few Good Boys"
2005–06	The Buzz on Maggie	Mrs. Pesky (voice)	Main role
