= Sanford and Son Theme (The Streetbeater) =

- 1973 7-inch vinyl single (US)

Song by Quincy Jones

from the album You've Got It Bad Girl
- Released: 1973
- Recorded: 1972
- Genre: Electric blues; funk
- Length: 3:06; 0:51 (theme version)
- Label: A&M
- Composer: Quincy Jones
- Producer: Quincy Jones

Audio sample
- "Sanford and Son Theme (The Streetbeater)": file; help

"Sanford and Son Theme (The Streetbeater)" is the instrumental theme to the 1970s sitcom Sanford and Son. It was composed by Quincy Jones. The main melody is a composite performed on multiple harmonicas by Tommy Morgan.

== Overview ==
Norman Lear and Bud Yorkin were developing an Americanized version of the British sitcom Steptoe and Son, and Yorkin approached Jones to compose the theme for the new show. Although initially incredulous that comedian Redd Foxx (whom Jones had known for a number of years and had a reputation for "blue" comedy) was to star in a television show, Jones was able to draw on his familiarity with Foxx, composing the instrumental theme in about 20 minutes and recording it in about the same amount of time.

"The Streetbeater" was first released by A&M Records on Jones's 1973 album You've Got It Bad Girl and as a single from that album. It is also featured on his Greatest Hits album.

Although the piece itself did not reach Billboard status for that year, it has maintained mainstream popularity, ranking 9th in a Rolling Stone Reader Poll of Television Theme Songs.

The song was sampled by pop artist M.I.A. in “U.R.A.Q.T.”, a track from her 2005 debut album Arular.

== Personnel ==
- Composer & Conductor: Quincy Jones
- Harmonica: Tommy Morgan
- Drums: James Gadson
- Alto Saxophone: Phil Woods
- Electric Piano: Dave Grusin
- Tenor Saxophone: Ernie Watts
- Bass: Chuck Rainey (Played the wrong last note but kept by Quincy)
- Trumpet: Quincy Jones

== Other recordings ==
Harry James recorded a version in 1979 on his album Still Harry After All These Years (Sheffield Lab LAB 11).
