= Sinclair Park =

Formerly segregated community in Bremerton, Washington

- Neighborhood
- Country: United States
- State: Washington
- County: Kitsap
- City: Bremerton
- Built: 1943
- Demolished: 1948
- Named for: Sinclair Inlet

Sinclair Park, also known as Sinclair Heights, was a segregated community in Bremerton, Washington. It was built as a housing project during World War II and was demolished in 1948.

== History ==
=== Planning and construction ===
At the onset of World War II, the Puget Sound Naval Shipyard in Bremerton processed large numbers of incoming workers, nearly quintupling Bremerton's population. In response to the suddenly increased demand for housing, the city established a housing authority and began building a series of housing projects for the workers. The rapid expansion included substantial diversification of the area. Between 1940 and 1945, the number of Black residents in Bremerton grew from just seven to 4,500. As the city grew more diverse, the number of racist incidents also increased.

On July 19, 1940, Bremerton established a city housing authority and tasked it with overseeing the construction of new housing and acting as a landlord for newly-constructed houses. The authority began constructing Sinclair Park in 1942, placing prefabricated houses on the site and opening it for residents the following year. The first residents arrived in 1943.

=== Shift to a segregated community ===
While the project was initially planned as an integrated community, white residents consistently objected to this and by 1944 over 80% of Black families placed in city housing were placed in Sinclair Park. The community did not have bus service and was several miles from the closest grocers' and schools. The few businesses that were close to the area would sometimes charge higher prices to Sinclair Park's residents and the local property manager delegated maintenance to the residents themselves, unlike other Bremerton housing projects at the time.

=== Dispersal and site afterlife ===
After World War II ended, all housing projects developed by the city for shipyard workers were desegregated, including Sinclair Park. In order to accomplish this, the housing authority directed families to move to other nearby communities, with most choosing to move to Qualheim. In 1947 some of the homes were sold to veterans under the condition they were removed from the site and transported elsewhere, however, few were ultimately purchased. The city proposed various uses for the site, including an airfield or recreation center, but ultimately decided to donate it to the Washington National Guard, who transformed the community center into an armory. The building was demolished in 2002. A photo collage wall at the Bremerton Readiness Center depicts Sinclair Park.

== Layout and community institutions ==
The finished community consisted of 280 homes overlooking Sinclair Inlet. The homes were constructed with central heating and electric appliances, and many of the homes were duplexes shared by multiple families. The community only had two phones, one in the community center and one in a phone booth. The community center, nicknamed "The Armory," was one of the first buildings designed by NBBJ. Jazz musician Quincy Jones, whose father had moved their family to Sinclair Park for work, first played piano at the community center. Jones later described the experience in his autobiography, saying "That's where I began to find peace. I was eleven. I knew this was it for me. Forever."

Outside of the community center, Sinclair Park was home to a nursery, a church, a library, and a branch of the Benevolent and Protective Order of Elks.

== Notable residents ==
- Richard Crews, first Black basketball player for the University of Washington
- Quincy Jones, record producer and musician
