= You've Got It Bad Girl =

1973 studio album by Quincy Jones

Studio album by Quincy Jones
- Released: October 1973
- Recorded: 1973
- Studio: A&M Studios (Hollywood, CA); Sun West Studios (Hollywood, CA); The Record Plant (Hollywood, CA); The Burbank Studios (Burbank, CA); A&R Studios (New York)
- Genre: Jazz-funk
- Length: 42:39
- Label: A&M
- Producer: Quincy Jones

Quincy Jones chronology
The Hot Rock (1972)	You've Got It Bad Girl (1973)	Body Heat (1974)

Professional ratings
Review scores
Source	Rating
AllMusic	3.5/5 stars

You've Got It Bad Girl is a 1973 album by the American jazz musician/producer Quincy Jones.

The opening track is an interpretation of the Lovin' Spoonful's "Summer in the City" and won Grammy Award for Best Instrumental Arrangement at the 16th Annual Grammy Awards, beating Spain (instrumental) by Chick Corea in the process.

The track features Chuck Rainey on bass guitar, Eddy Louiss on Hammond organ, Dave Grusin on Rhodes piano, Grady Tate on drums, and Valerie Simpson, best known from Ashford & Simpson, on vocals. Simpson's lyrics are reduced to only one bridge and one chorus, while a line is changed from "Go out and find a girl" to "Ain't it nice just to be a girl?".

Jones's version of "Summer in the City" has been sampled by several artists.

The title track "You've Got It Bad Girl" is a song written by Yvonne Wright and Stevie Wonder and was originally released on Wonder's 1972 album Talking Book. Jones himself performs the lead vocals.

The album features another Stevie Wonder song: "Superstition", featuring vocals from Bill Withers, Billy Preston, and Stevie Wonder himself, billed as "Three Beautiful Brothers".

The album also includes the "Sanford and Son Theme (The Streetbeater)", which was used for the opening and closing credits themes for the NBC situation comedy Sanford and Son.

The final track on the album, "Chump Change", was first used as the main theme to 1972's The New Bill Cosby Show on CBS, where Jones's orchestra provided music. The CBS game show Now You See It used "Chump Change" as its main theme as well, both in 1974 and on its revival in 1989. The original recording has been used as the theme for Dutch sport radio show Langs de Lijn since 1975, and a remake is used by Norwegian broadcaster NRK for its show Ukeslutt.

== Track listing ==
1. "Summer in the City" (John Sebastian, Mark Sebastian, Steve Boone) – 4:05
2. "Eyes of Love" (Quincy Jones, Bob Russell) – 3:28
3. Tribute to A.F.-Ro': "Daydreaming"/"First Time Ever I Saw Your Face" (Aretha Franklin)/(Ewan MacColl) – 7:11
4. "Love Theme from The Getaway" (Jones) – 2:35
5. "You've Got It Bad Girl" (Stevie Wonder, Yvonne Wright) – 5:45
6. "Superstition" (Wonder) – 4:32
7. "Manteca" (Gil Fuller, Dizzy Gillespie, Chano Pozo) – 8:42
8. "Sanford and Son Theme (The Streetbeater)" (Jones) – 3:05
9. "Chump Change" (Bill Cosby, Jones) – 3:19

== Personnel ==
- Quincy Jones – trumpet, arranger, conductor, vocals, soloist
- Dave Grusin – electric piano
- Phil Woods – alto saxophone
- Tom Junior Morgan – harmonica soloist
- Toots Thielemans – guitar, whistle, harmonica
- Ernie Watts – saxophone
- Bobbye Porter – percussion
- Bob James & Creations – keyboards
- Ray Brown – bass
- Carol Kaye, Chuck Rainey – electric bass
- Eddie Louiss – organ
- George Duke – piano
- Grady Tate – drums
- Hubert Laws – flute, alto flute
- Cat Anderson – soloist
- Valerie Simpson – vocals
- Quincy Duke – vocals

Production

- Quincy Jones – producer, mixing
- Ray Brown – producer, mixing
- Phil (Boogie) Schier – mixing
- Phil Ramone – engineer
- Kevin Reeves – mastering

== Charts ==
- Jazz Albums: #1
- R&B Albums: #14
- Billboard 200: #94
