= FAB Universal =

Podcasting and audio company

- Type: Public
- Traded as: AMEX: FU
- Founded: 1996
- Website: www.fabuniversal.com

FAB Universal was a US-based company formed from a long series of mergers and acquisitions, including Liberated Syndication, Wizzard Software and Digital Entertainment International. The company ceased operations in 2017.

== History ==
=== Wizzard Software ===
Wizzard Software Corporation was founded in late 1995 and registered in Delaware on February 29, 1996, to license speech recognition software from AT&T and IBM. Christopher J. Spencer was chief executive, and Armen Geronian was a co-founder and chief technical officer. Spencer and Geronian had developed money transfer service software called ChinaWire. Wizzard's product was called the Interactive Voice Assistant, and its operations were in Pittsburgh, Pennsylvania.

In February 2008, Wizzard's shares were moved to the American Stock Exchange with symbol WZE. Although the Great Recession affected profitability, the number of download requests for podcasts grew from 1 billion in 2007, 1.6 billion in 2010. Through 2011 the company continued to post losses, and its share price dropped below the minimum required for listing. A 1-for-12 reverse stock split was approved, and took effect in February 2012 while negotiating on a proposed merger agreement. In May 2012, the American Stock Exchange was renamed NYSE MKT.

=== Balanced Living ===
Balanced Living was incorporated in Nevada in January 1998, by Jeannene N. Barham and others with personal financing, that offered motivational seminars, books and related products by her sister Rose N. Blackham. It did business in a subsidiary called The Balanced Woman, incorporated on July 1, 1998, in Colorado, with operations in Salt Lake City, Utah. After the burst of the dot-com bubble, the company experienced losses and investigated outside investment or a merger. On May 26, 2000, the Balanced Woman, Incorporated, business was spun off, still based in Colorado and Utah. On May 30, 2000, Jeffrey Hardman became president, as part a merger agreement with Wizzard. Its shares were listed on the OTC Bulletin Board (OTC BB) under symbol WIZD in April 2000. Investors (aside from the principals) included Corporate Capital Management LLC of Minnetonka, Minnesota, and Voice Recognition Investment Limited Partners, of Chapel Hill, North Carolina.

=== Speech Systems Incorportated ===
Speech Systems Incorporated (registered in Florida) was acquired by Wizzard on May 22, 2001. April 2004, Wizzard acquired MedivoxRx Technologies, based in Pittsford, New York. MedivoxRx, founded in 200, developed a "talking bottle" called Rex which would play voice instructions for taking prescription medicines.

=== Interim Healthcare ===
On March 18, 2005, the company agreed to acquire Interim Healthcare of Wyoming for about $1.2 million in cash and stock. Wizard planned to incorporate speech recognition into medical nurse and office workflows. Revenues increased from about $524,000 to $1.7 million from 2004 to 2005, while net losses also increased from about $5.5 million to almost $6 million.

=== Liberated Syndication ===
Webmayhem Incorporated, doing business as Liberated Syndication (shortened to Libsyn) was founded in 2004 in Pittsburgh by students at the University of Pittsburgh David J. Chekan, Matthew T. Hoopes, David Mansueto and Martin Mulligan. High-profile podcasting clients of the service included National Public Radio and the Grammar Girls. Wizzard agreed to acquire Libsyn for about $15 million in stock shares in October 2006.

In 2006 the company moved into the podcasting service and technology business, after receiving requests to use its text-to-speech technology to generate podcasts from written articles. In July 2006 they acquired Switchpod.com for about $205,000 and in September Blastpodcast.com, which closed in December 2006 for $40,000. Jake Fisher and Weina Scott, the owners of Switchpod, were 17 years old at the time, so their parents signed the merger agreement.

=== Future Healthcare of America ===
Since technology such as Siri had become available on common devices such as the iPhone, the planned business in speech recognition for health care had never materialized. The company's medical business (Interim Healthcare) was spun out to shareholders, effective October 1, 2012, as Future Healthcare of America, traded as symbol FUTU on the OTC BB. It had locations in Casper, Wyoming and Billings, Montana.

=== Digital Entertainment International ===
Digital Entertainment International, Limited, was a distributor of digital entertainment media in Asia, though kiosks and stores with the FAB brand. FAB was organized in the Hong Kong Special Administrative Region, as a subsidiary of Universal Entertainment Group Limited in the British Virgin Islands.

=== FAB Universal ===
The FAB brand was created in 2008 for self-service kiosks that allow customers to download music, movies and TV episodes on their portable devices while video ads are played. Around 12,500 were located throughout China. Wizzard agreed on terms to acquire FAB on April 5, 2012, after an initial announcement in August 2011. In September 2012, the acquisition was completed, and the resulting company renamed itself FAB Universal Corporation. Its stock symbol changed to FU effective October 9, 2012. The speech processing software part of the business was renamed Wizzard Speech Software in late 2012. It markets a product AT&T Natural Voices that translates text to speech, Wizzard Wavefile Factory software for Microsoft Windows, and service to convert text to speech. In April 2013, it was reported that Laurie Sims led the Libsyn division. The combined company had 24 employees in Oakland neighborhood in Pittsburgh and about 192 in China.

The combined company continued with Spencer as chief executive, but Zhang Hongcheng became chairman of the board of directors, and Bingbin Zhong became vice president of finance. Beijing Dingtai Guanqun Culture Company, Limited, was the Chinese subsidiary, further divided into the variable interest entity Beijing FAB Culture Media Company, Limited, and Beijing FAB Digital Entertainment Products Company, Limited. Two large retail stores are located in the Joy City shopping mall and one in the SoShow shopping district which opened October 12, 2012 near Chongwenmen.

=== Public Company ===
Investor Jim Rogers joined the board of directors in June 2013. Near the end of September 2013, an unusual amount of share trading activity attracted attention. The share price had more than doubled and then declined by half within a few weeks on unusually high volume. This caused the company to issue a statement clarifying the dilution effect of shares as lock-up periods expire following the 2012 merger.
