= Gula Matari =

Studio album by Quincy Jones
- Released: 1970
- Recorded: March 25–26 and May 12, 1970
- Studio: Van Gelder Studios, Englewood Cliffs, New Jersey
- Genre: Jazz
- Length: 34:54
- Label: A&M
- Producer: Creed Taylor

Quincy Jones chronology
John and Mary (1970)	Gula Matari (1970)	They Call Me Mister Tibbs! (1970)

Professional ratings
Review scores
Source	Rating
AllMusic	4.5/5 stars
The Penguin Guide to Jazz Recordings	2.5/4 stars

Gula Matari is a 1970 studio album by Quincy Jones.

== Track listing ==
1. "Bridge over Troubled Water" (Paul Simon) – 5:09
2. "Gula Matari" (Quincy Jones) – 13:02
3. "Walkin'" (Jimmy Mundy, Richard Carpenter) – 8:02
4. "Hummin'" (Nat Adderley) – 8:08

== Personnel ==
- Pepper Adams – baritone saxophone
- Danny Bank – bass and baritone saxophones
- Hubert Laws – flute solos
- Jerome Richardson – soprano saxophone solos
- Freddie Hubbard, Danny Moore, Ernie Royal, Marvin Stamm, Gene Young – trumpet/flugelhorn
- Wayne Andre – trombone
- Al Grey – trombone solos
- Toots Thielemans – guitar and whistle solo
- Herbie Hancock, Bob James, Bobby Scott – keyboards
- Grady Tate – drums
- Don Elliott – bass marimba on "Gula Matari"
- Jimmy Johnson, Warren Smith – percussion
- Ray Brown – bass
- Ron Carter – bass on "Gula Matari"
- Richard Davis – bass on "Gula Matari"
- Major Holley – bass and voice solo
- Milt Jackson – vibes
- Seymour Barab, Kermit Moore, Lucien Schmit, Alan Shulman – cello
- Valerie Simpson, Marilyn Jackson, Maretha Stewart, Barbara Massey, Hilda Harris – vocals

=== Performance ===
- Quincy Jones – arranger, conductor
- Pete Turner – photography
