= Quincy Jones production discography =

Quincy Jones discography
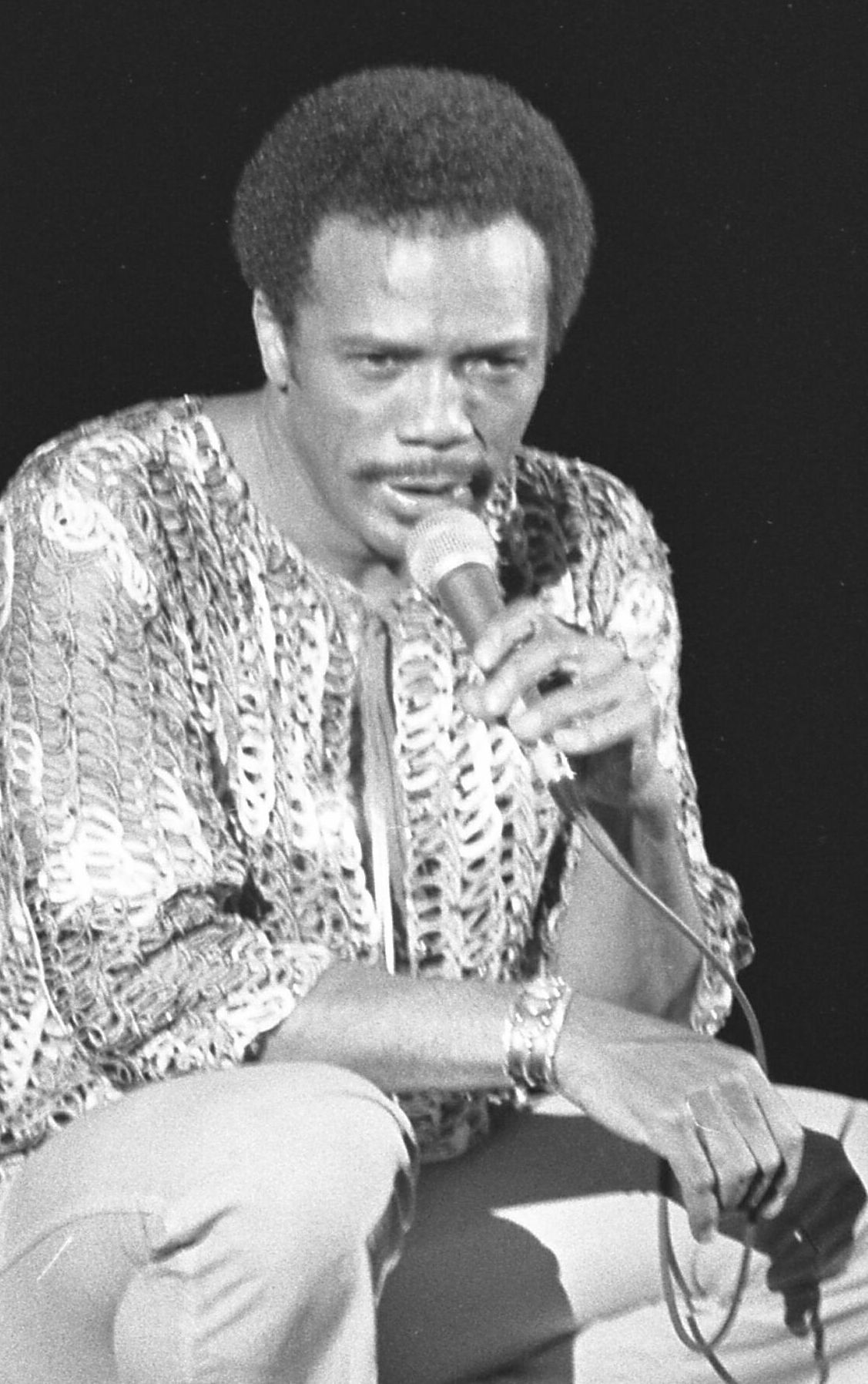
- Jones in 1975
- Studio albums: 16
- Soundtrack albums: 24
- Live albums: 3
- Compilation albums: 4

Quincy Jones, an American record producer, musical arranger, film composer, impresario, conductor, and trumpeter, charted 6 singles and 6 albums in the top 40 and won 4 Platinum Awards and 7 Gold Awards only in the United States. Jones was one of few producers to have number one records in three consecutive decades (1960s, 1970s, and 1980s).

== Albums ==
=== As leader ===
Year	Title	Label	Chart positions				Certifications
Year	Title	Label	US	US Jazz	US R&B	UK	Certifications
1955	Jazz Abroad	EmArcy	—	—	—	—	
1956	This Is How I Feel About Jazz	ABC-Paramount	—	—	—	—	
1957	Go West, Man!	ABC-Paramount	—	—	—	—	
1958	Quincy's Home Again	Metronome	—	—	—	—	
1959	The Birth of a Band!	Mercury	—	21	—	—	
1959	The Great Wide World of Quincy Jones	Mercury	—	—	—	—	
1960	I Dig Dancers	Mercury	—	—	—	—	
1961	Around the World	Mercury	—	—	—	—	
1961	Newport '61	Mercury	—	—	—	—	
1961	The Great Wide World of Quincy Jones Live (in Zurich!)	Mercury	—	24	—	—	
1961	The Quintessence	impulse!	—	—	—	—	
1962	Big Band Bossa Nova	Mercury	112	—	—	—	
1963	Quincy Jones Plays Hip Hits	Mercury	—	—	—	—	
1964	Quincy Jones Explores the Music of Henry Mancini	Mercury	—	—	—	—	
1964	Golden Boy	Mercury	—	—	—	—	
1964	I/We Had a Ball	Limelight	—	—	—	—	
1965	Quincy Plays for Pussycats	Mercury	—	—	—	—	
1965	Quincy's Got a Brand New Bag	Mercury	—	—	—	—	
1969	Walking in Space	A&M	56	2	6	—	
1970	Gula Matari	A&M	63	2	16	—	
1971	Smackwater Jack	A&M	56	1	11	—	
1972	Ndeda (Compilation)	Mercury	73	12	—	—	
1973	You've Got It Bad Girl	A&M	94	1	14	—	
1974	Body Heat	A&M	6	1	1	—	US: Gold
1975	Mellow Madness	A&M	16	1	3	—	
1976	I Heard That!!	A&M	43	1	16	—	
1978	Sounds...and Stuff Like That!!	A&M	15	1	4	—	US: Platinum
1981	Quincy Jones Live at the Budokan	A&M	—	—	—	—	
1981	The Dude	A&M	9	3	3	19	US: Platinum; BPI: Silver
1982	The Best (compilation)	A&M	122	17	45	41	
1985	The Best of Quincy Jones Volume 2 (compilation)	A&M	—	—	—	—	
1987	Strike Up the Band (compilation)	Mercury	—	—	—	—	
1989	Back on the Block	Qwest	9	1	1	26	US: Platinum; BPI: Gold
1993	Miles & Quincy Live at Montreux (with Miles Davis)	Warner Bros.	—	1	—	—	
1995	Q's Jook Joint	Qwest	32	1	6	—	US: Platinum
1999	From Q with Love (Compilation)	Warner Bros.	72	1	31	—	
2000	Basie and Beyond (The Quincy Jones/Sammy Nestico Orchestra)	Warner Bros.	—	10	—	—	
2001	Q - The Musical Biography of Quincy Jones (Compilation)	Rhino	—	—	—	—	
2004	The Original Jam Sessions 1969 (with Bill Cosby)	Concord Jazz	—	12	—	—	
2010	Q Soul Bossa Nostra	Interscope	86	—	15	—	
"—" denotes releases that did not chart or were not released in that territory.

=== Soundtracks ===
Year	Title	Label	Chart positions			Certifications
Year	Title	Label	US	US Jazz	US R&B	Certifications
1961	The Boy in the Tree (EP)	Mercury	—	—	—	
1965	The Pawnbroker	Mercury	—	—	—	
1965	Mirage	Mercury	—	—	—	
1966	The Slender Thread	Mercury	—	—	—	
1966	Walk, Don't Run	Mainstream	—	—	—	
1967	The Deadly Affair	Verve	—	—	—	
1967	Enter Laughing	Liberty	—	—	—	
1967	In the Heat of the Night	United Artists	—	—	—	
1967	In Cold Blood	Colgems	—	—	—	
1968	For Love of Ivy	ABC	192	—	—	
1968	The Split (film)	Film Score Monthly	—	—	—	
1968	A Dandy in Aspic		—	—	—	
1969	Mackenna's Gold	RCA Victor	—	—	—	
1969	The Italian Job	Paramount	—	—	—	
1969	The Lost Man	Uni	—	—	—	
1969	Bob & Carol & Ted & Alice	Bell	—	—	—	
1969	Cactus Flower	Bell	—	—	—	
1970	John and Mary	A&M	—	—	—	
1970	They Call Me Mister Tibbs!	United Artists	—	—	—	
1971	The Anderson Tapes		—	—	—	
1971	$	Reprise	173	—	—	
1972	Killer by Night		—	—	—	
1972	The Getaway (7-inch)	A&M	—	—	—	
1972	The Hot Rock	Prophesy	—	—	—	
1977	Roots	A&M	21	4	6	US: Gold
1978	The Wiz	MCA, Motown	40	—	33	
1985	The Color Purple	Qwest	—	—	—	
"—" denotes releases that did not chart or were not released in that territory.

=== As sideman ===
Sortable table
Date	Artist	Album title	Label	Notes
1953	Lionel Hampton	Oh, Rock! Live		
1953	Clifford Brown	Clifford Brown Big Band in Paris	Prestige	QJ plays trumpet in horn section
1954	Dizzy Gillespie	Afro	Norgran	
1954	Dizzy Gillespie	Dizzy and Strings	Norgran	
1954	Gigi Gryce	Gigi Gryce's Jazztime Paris, Vol. 1	Blue Note	
1954	Gigi Gryce	Gigi Gryce's Jazztime Paris, Vol. 2	Blue Note	
1954	Art Farmer	The Art Farmer Septet	Prestige	first released on 7-inch EPs a year before
1956	Dizzy Gillespie	World Statesman	Norgran	
1957	Dizzy Gillespie	Dizzy in Greece	Verve	
1957	Dizzy Gillespie	Dizzy Gillespie's Big Band Jazz	American Recording Society	
1957	Thad Jones, Jimmy Jones, Eddie Jones, Jo Jones	The Jones Boys	Period	
1975	Lesley Gore	Love Me by Name		
1983	James Ingram	It's Your Night		QJ plays electric piano on one track
1992	The Isley Brothers	Tracks of Life	Warner Bros.	QJ plays keyboards (plus drum machine and synthesizer programming) on "Brazilizan Wedding Song (Setembro)"
1995	Sonny Parker	Complete 1948–1953		
1995	Lucky Thompson, Gigi Gryce, Art Farmer	Lucky Thompson and Gigi Gryce in Paris	Vogue/RCA Victor	Compilation of live recordings from 1953 (Gryce) and 1956
1995	Toots Thielemans	Yesterday & Today		
1998	Dinah Washington	Dinah Washington with Quincy Jones		
2005	Willis "Gator" Jackson	The Remaining Willis Jackson 1951–1959	Blue Moon	

=== As composer, conductor, arranger, producer ===
Artist	Album	Year	Label	Producer	Composer	Conductor	Arranger
Cannonball Adderley	Julian "Cannonball" Adderley	1955	EmArcy	No	Yes, three tracks	Yes	Yes
Herb Alpert	You Smile – The Song Begins	1974	A&M	No	No	No	Yes
Ray Anthony	Standards	1954	Capitol	No	No	No	Yes
Louis Armstrong	Louis	1964	Mercury	No	No	No	Yes
Harry Arnold	Harry Arnold + Big Band + Quincy Jones = Jazz!	1958	Mercury	No	No	No	Yes
Patti Austin	Every Home Should Have One	1981	Qwest	Yes	No	No	Yes
Patti Austin	Patti Austin	1984	Qwest	Yes	No	No	No
Benny Bailey	Quincy - Here We Come	1959	Metronome	No	Yes	No	No
Eddie Barclay	Et Voila!	1957	Barclay	No	No	No	Yes
Eddie Barclay	Twilight Time	1960	Barclay	No	No	No	Yes
Count Basie Orchestra	Basie One More Time	1958	Roulette	No	Yes	No	Yes
Count Basie Orchestra	String Along with Basie	1959	Roulette	No	Yes	No	Yes
Count Basie Orchestra	Li'l Ol' Groovemaker...Basie!	1963	Verve	No	Yes	Yes	Yes
Count Basie Orchestra	This Time by Basie!	1963	Reprise	No	No	Yes	Yes
Count Basie Orchestra and Billy Eckstine	Basie and Eckstine, Inc.	1959	Roulette	No	No	No	Yes
Emily Bear	Diversity	2013	Concord Records	Yes	No	No	No
Tony Bennett	The Movie Song Album	1966	Columbia	No	Yes	Yes	Yes
George Benson	Give Me the Night	1980	Qwest	Yes	No	No	Yes
Brook Benton	There Goes That Song Again	1961	Mercury	No	No	Yes	Yes
Big Maybelle	"Whole Lotta Shakin' Goin' On" and "Ocean of Tears"	1955	Okeh	No	No	Yes	Yes
The Brothers Johnson	Look Out for #1	1976	A&M	Yes	Yes	Yes	Yes
The Brothers Johnson	Right on Time	1977	A&M	Yes	Yes	Yes	Yes
The Brothers Johnson	Blam!	1978	A&M	Yes	Yes	No	Yes
The Brothers Johnson	Light Up the Night	1980	A&M	Yes	No	No	Yes
Clifford Brown and Art Farmer w/The Swedish All Stars	Memorial, four tracks prev. rel. on two 7-inch EPs	1956	Prestige, orig. on Metronome (1953)	Yes	No	No	Yes, two tracks
Ray Brown Orchestra	Harold Robbins Presents Music from The Adventurers	1970	Symbolic	Yes	No	No	Yes, three tracks w/Brown
David Carroll	Happy Feet	1964	Mercury	Yes	No	No	No
Diahann Carroll	Diahann Carroll Sings Harold Arlen's Songs	1956	Victor	No	No	Yes	Yes
Betty Carter w/Ray Bryant	Meet Betty Carter and Ray Bryant	1955	Epic	No	No	Yes	Yes
Betty Carter	Social Call	1955	Epic	No	No	Yes	Yes
Ray Charles	The Great Ray Charles	1956	Atlantic	No	Yes	No	Yes
Ray Charles	The Genius of Ray Charles	1959	Atlantic	No	No	No	Yes
Ray Charles	Genius + Soul = Jazz	1960	Impulse!	No	No	No	Yes
Ray Charles	A Message from the People	1972	Tangerine	No	No	Yes	Yes
Jimmy Cleveland	Introducing Jimmy Cleveland and His All Stars	1955	EmArcy	No	Yes	Yes	Yes
Sammy Davis Jr. and the Count Basie Orchestra	Our Shining Hour	1964	Verve	No	No	Yes	Yes
Les Double Six	The Double Six Meet Quincy Jones	1960	Columbia	No	Yes	Yes	Yes
Billy Eckstine	At Basin Street East	1962	Mercury	Yes	No	Yes	Yes
Billy Eckstine	Don't Worry 'Bout Me	1962	Mercury	Yes	No	No	No
Billy Eckstine	The Golden Hits of Billy Eckstine	1963	Mercury	Yes	No	No	No
Billy Eckstine	Now Singing In 12 Great Movies	1963	Mercury	Yes	No	No	No
Billy Eckstine	The Modern Sound of Mr. B	1964	Mercury	Yes	No	No	No
Don Elliot	A Musical Offering by Don Elliot	1955	ABC	No	No	Yes	Yes
Art Farmer	The Art Farmer Septet	1956	Prestige	Yes	Yes	No	Yes
Art Farmer	Last Night When We Were Young	1958	ABC-Paramount	No	No	Yes	Yes
Robert Farnon	The Sensuous Strings of Robert Farnon	1963	Philips	Yes	No	No	No
Robert Farnon	Captain from Castile and Other Great Movie Themes	1964	Philips	Yes	No	No	No
Ella Fitzgerald (with Count Basie)	Ella and Basie!	1963	Verve	No	No	Yes	Yes
Aretha Franklin	Hey Now Hey (The Other Side of the Sky)	1973	Atlantic	Yes w/Franklin	No	Yes	Yes
Terry Gibbs	Terry Gibbs Plays Jewish Melodies in Jazztime	1963	Mercury	Yes	No	No	No
Dizzy Gillespie	World Statesman	1956	Norgran	No	Yes	No	Yes
Dizzy Gillespie	Dizzy in Greece	1956	Verve	No	Yes	No	Yes
Dizzy Gillespie	Dizzy on the French Riviera	1962	Philips	Yes	No	No	No
Dizzy Gillespie	New Wave	1962	Philips	Yes	No	No	No
Lesley Gore	I'll Cry If I Want To (with "It's My Party")	1963	Mercury	Yes	No	No	No
Lesley Gore	Lesley Gore Sings of Mixed-Up Hearts	1963	Mercury	Yes	No	No	No
Lesley Gore	Boys, Boys, Boys	1964	Mercury	Yes	No	No	No
Lesley Gore	Girl Talk	1964	Mercury	Yes	No	No	No
Lesley Gore	My Town, My Guy & Me	1965	Mercury	Yes	No	No	No
Manos Hadjidakis	Gioconda's Smile	1965	Fontana	Yes	No	No	No
Donny Hathaway	Come Back Charleston Blue (O.S.T.)	1972	ATCO	Yes	No	No	No
Lena Horne	Lena Horne: The Lady and Her Music	1981	Qwest	Yes	No	No	No
James Ingram	It's Your Night	1983	Qwest	Yes	Yes, co-comp. "Yah Mo B There"	No	No
Michael Jackson	Off the Wall	1979	Epic	Yes (w/Jackson)	No	No	No
Michael Jackson	E.T. the Extra-Terrestrial	1982	MCA	Yes	No	No	No
Michael Jackson	Thriller	1982	Epic	Yes (w/Jackson)	Yes , "P.Y.T." w/J. Ingram	No	No
Michael Jackson	Bad	1987	Epic	Yes w/Jackson	No	No	No
Milt Jackson	Plenty, Plenty Soul	1957	Atlantic	No	Yes, three tracks	No	Yes, three tracks
Milt Jackson	The Ballad Artistry of Milt Jackson	1959	Atlantic	No	Yes, co-comp. one track	Yes	Yes
Bob James	Bold Conceptions	1963	Mercury	Yes	No	No	No
Gene Krupa feat. Anita O'Day and Roy Eldridge	Drummer Man Gene Krupa in Highest Hi-Fi	1956	Verve	No	No	No	Yes, 8 of 12 tracks
Peggy Lee	If You Go	1961	Capitol	No	No	Yes, two tracks	Yes
Peggy Lee	Blues Cross Country	1962	Capitol	No	Yes, co-comp. one track	Yes	Yes
Little Richard	The King of the Gospel Singers	1962	Mercury	Yes	Yes, co-comp. two tracks	Yes	Yes
Terrace Martin	3ChordFold	2013	Akai Music	Yes, co-prod. "Gone"	No	No	No
Helen Merrill	Helen Merrill	1955	EmArcy	Yes	No	Yes	Yes
James Moody	Moody	1956	Prestige	No	No	No	Yes
Nana Mouskouri	The Girl from Greece Sings	1962	Fontana	Yes	No	No	No
Joe Newman	The Happy Cats	1957	Coral	No	No	No	Yes, "Buttercup"
Billy Preston	I Wrote a Simple Song	1971	A&M	No	No	No	Yes, strings and horn arr.
Paul Quinichette	Moods	1954	Prestige	No	Yes, six comp.	No	Yes
Rufus feat. Chaka Khan	Masterjam	1979	MCA	Yes	Yes, co-comp. one track	No	No
Frank Sinatra with Count Basie	It Might as Well Be Swing	1964	Reprise	No	No	Yes	Yes
Frank Sinatra with Count Basie	Sinatra at the Sands	1966	Reprise	No	No	Yes	Yes
Frank Sinatra	L.A. Is My Lady	1984	Qwest	Yes	Yes, co-comp. title track	Yes	Yes, co-arr. title track
Sonny Stitt	Sonny Stitt Plays Arrangements from the Pen of Quincy Jones	1955	Roost	No	No	Yes	Yes
Donna Summer	Donna Summer	1982	Geffen	Yes	Yes, co-comp. two tracks	No	Yes, vocals and rhythm arr.
Tamia	Tamia	1998	Qwest	Yes, co-prod. one track; co-exec. prod.	No	No	No
Billy Taylor	My Fair Lady Loves Jazz	1957	ABC-Paramount	No	No	Yes	Yes
Clark Terry	Clark Terry	1955	EmArcy	No	Yes, three tracks	No	Yes
Various artists	USA for Africa: We Are the World (single)	1985	Columbia	Yes w/Michael Omartian	Yes, B-side "Grace"	Yes	No
Sarah Vaughan	Vaughan and Violins	1959	Mercury	No	Yes, co-comp. one track	Yes	Yes
Sarah Vaughan	You're Mine You	1962	Roulette	No	No	Yes	Yes
Sarah Vaughan	Sassy Swings the Tivoli	1964	Mercury	Yes	Yes, "Sassy's Blues" w/Vaughan	No	No
Sarah Vaughan	Vaughan with Voices	1964	Mercury	Yes	No	No	No
Sarah Vaughan	¡Viva! Vaughan	1965	Mercury	Yes	No	No	No
Sarah Vaughan	Sarah Vaughan Sings the Mancini Songbook	1965	Mercury	Yes	No	No	No
Dinah Washington	For Those in Love	1955	EmArcy	No	No	No	Yes
Dinah Washington	The Swingin' Miss "D"	1957	EmArcy	No	Yes, "You're Crying" w/lyrics: Leonard Feather	Yes	Yes (exc. three tracks)
Dinah Washington	Tears and Laughter	1962	Mercury	No	No	Yes	Yes
Dinah Washington	I Wanna Be Loved	1962	Mercury	No?	Yes, "You're Crying" w/lyrics: Leonard Feather	Yes	Yes
Julius Watkins	French Horns for My Lady	1962	Philips	Yes	No	No	No
Andy Williams	Under Paris Skies	1960	Cadence	No	No	No	Yes
The Winans	Decisions	1987	Qwest Records	Yes	No	No	No

== Singles ==
Year	Title	Chart positions									Certification
Year	Title	US	US R&B	US Dance	US AC	NZ	NED	BEL (FLA)	GER	UK	Certification
1962	"Soul Bossa Nova"	—	—	—	—	—	—	—	—	—	
1970	"Killer Joe"	74	47	—	29	—	—	—	—	—	
1972	"Money Runner"	57	46	—	—	—	—	—	—	—	
1975	"Is It Love That We're Missin'?" (with The Brothers Johnson)	70	18	—	—	—	—	—	—	—	
1977	Roots Medley	57	32	—	21	—	—	—	—	—	
1978	"Stuff Like That"	21	1	—	—	—	24	—	—	34	
1978	"Love, I Never Had It So Good" (with Patti Austin and Charles May)	—	60	—	—	—	—	—	—	—	
1981	"Ai No Corrida" (with Dune)	28	10	3	—	—	—	—	28	14	
1981	"Just Once" (with James Ingram)	17	11	—	7	—	—	—	—	—	
1981	"Razzamatazz" (with Patti Austin)	—	17	—	—	—	—	—	—	11	
1981	"One Hundred Ways" (with James Ingram)	14	10	—	5	—	—	—	—	—	
1981	"Betcha Wouldn't Hurt Me"	—	—	—	—	—	—	—	—	52	
1989	"I'll Be Good to You" (with Ray Charles & Chaka Khan)	18	1	1	30	7	38	34	28	21	
1990	"The Secret Garden (Sweet Seduction Suite)" (with Al B. Sure, James Ingram, El DeBarge & Barry White)	31	1	—	26	—	13	31	—	67	US: Gold
1990	"Tomorrow (A Better You, Better Me)" (with Tevin Campbell)	75	1	—	—	22	21	—	—	—	
1990	"I Don't Go for That"	—	15	—	—	—	—	—	—	—	
1991	"Wee B. Dooinit"	—	83	—	—	—	—	—	—	—	
1995	"You Put a Move on My Heart" (featuring Tamia)	98	16	—	—	—	—	—	—	—	
1996	"Stomp"	—	—	1	—	—	—	—	—	28	
1996	"Slow Jams" (with Babyface, Tamia, Portrait & Barry White)	68	10	—	—	2	—	—	—	—	
1999	"Something I Cannot Have"	—	87	—	—	—	—	—	—	—	
2010	"Sanford & Son" (featuring T.I., B.o.B, Prince Charlez and Mohombi)	—	—	—	—	—	—	—	—	—	
2010	"It's My Party" (featuring Amy Winehouse)	—	—	—	—	—	—	11	—	—	
"—" denotes releases that did not chart or were not released in that territory.
