= Quincy Jones Plays Hip Hits =

Studio album by Quincy Jones
- Released: 1963
- Recorded: June 15, 1962; September 8, 1962; April 9–11, 1963
- Studio: A & R Studios, New York City
- Genre: Jazz
- Label: Mercury
- Producer: Quincy Jones

Quincy Jones chronology
Big Band Bossa Nova (1962)	Quincy Jones Plays Hip Hits (1963)	Quincy Jones Explores the Music of Henry Mancini (1964)

Quincy Jones Plays Hip Hits is an album by Quincy Jones consisting of songs that were hits for other musicians. It was released by Mercury in 1963. Featured soloists include Joe Newman, Zoot Sims, and Phil Woods.

== Reception ==
Professional ratings
Review scores
Source	Rating
Allmusic	2.5/5 stars

Scott Yanow of Allmusic stated "By 1963, Quincy Jones' music was at a crossroads. Still jazz-oriented, Jones' work with a studio big band was clearly aimed at trying to sell records rather than play creative jazz. ... However, the performances all clock in around three minutes, and the jazz players take solos that often only count as cameos. Pleasant but not particularly substantial music".

== Track listing ==
1. "Comin' Home Baby" (Bob Dorough, Ben Tucker) - 2:46
2. "Gravy Waltz" (Steve Allen, Ray Brown) - 2:42
3. "Desafinado" (Antonio Carlos Jobim, Newton Mendonça) - 2:55
4. "Exodus" (Ernest Gold) - 3:20
5. "Cast Your Fate to the Wind" (Vince Guaraldi) - 2:45
6. "A Taste of Honey" (Ric Marlow, Robert William Scott) - 2:35
7. "Back at the Chicken Shack" (Jimmy Smith) - 2:59
8. "Jive Samba" (Nat Adderley) - 2:42
9. "Take Five" (Paul Desmond) - 3:30
10. "Walk on the Wild Side" (Elmer Bernstein, Mack David) - 3:10
11. "Watermelon Man" (Herbie Hancock) - 3:20
12. "Bossa Nova U.S.A." (Dave Brubeck) - 3:20

== Personnel ==
- Al Cohn, Frank Wess, James Moody, Roland Kirk, Walter Levinsky, Zoot Sims - saxophone
- Budd Johnson, Jerome Richardson, Seldon Powell, Romeo Penque - reeds
- Al Perisi, Clark Terry, Ernie Royal, James Nottingham, Joe Newman, Snooky Young - trumpet
- Billy Byers, Jimmy Cleveland, Kai Winding, Melba Liston, Paul Faulise, Quentin "Butter" Jackson, Santo Russo, Thomas Mitchell - trombone
- Earl Chapin, Fred Klein, James Buffington, Julius Watkins, Paul Ingraham, Ray Alonge, Bob Northern, Willie Ruff - french horn
- Charles McCoy - harmonica
- Bobby Scott, Lalo Schifrin, Patti Bown - piano, organ
- Jim Hall, Kenny Burrell, Sam Herman, Wayne Wright - guitar
- Ray Crawford - guitar
- Art Davis, Ben Tucker, Chris White, George Duvivier, Major Holley, Milt Hinton - bass
- Ed Shaughnessy, Osie Johnson, Rudy Collins - drums
- Bill Costa, Carlos Gomez, George Devins, Jack Del Rio, Charles McCoy, James Johnson, Jose Paula - percussion

== See also ==
- Quincy Jones discography
