= Quincy's Home Again =

Studio album by Quincy Jones with Harry Arnold and His Swedish Radio Jazz Orchestra
- Released: 1958
- Recorded: February 14, March 19 and April 29, 1958
- Studio: Stockholm, Sweden
- Genre: Jazz
- Label: Metronome

Quincy Jones chronology
Go West, Man! (1957)	Quincy's Home Again (1958)	The Birth of a Band! (1959)

Harry Arnold + Big Band + Quincy Jones = Jazz! cover

Quincy's Home Again is an album by Quincy Jones with performances by Harry Arnold's Orchestra. The album was recorded in Sweden in 1958 and released by Metronome label. The album was also released in the U.S. as Harry Arnold + Big Band + Quincy Jones = Jazz! by EmArcy.

== Reception ==
Professional ratings
Review scores
Source	Rating
AllMusic	4/5 stars

AllMusic gave the album four stars, calling it "an excellent effort featuring a hard-swinging Swedish band that deserved to be better known in the U.S".

== Track listing ==
All compositions by Harry Arnold, except as indicated.

1. "Quincy's Home Again" – 2:28
2. "The Midnight Sun Never Sets" (Jones, Dorcas Cochran, Henri Salvador) – 4:07
3. "Cherokee" (Ray Noble) – 3:14
4. "Count 'Em" (Jones, Jimmy Cleveland) – 5:30
5. "Brief Encounter" – 3:04
6. "Room 608" (Horace Silver) – 3:14
7. "Kinda Blues" – 6:00
8. "Meet Benny Bailey" (Jones) – 3:50
9. "Doodlin'" (Silver) – 5:13

== Personnel ==
- Quincy Jones – arranger
- Harry Arnold – director
- Benny Bailey – trumpet
- Sixten Eriksson – trumpet
- Arnold Johansson – trumpet
- Weine Renliden – trumpet
- Bengt-Arne Wallin – trumpet
- Gordon Ohlsson – trombone
- Åke Persson – trombone
- Andreas Skjold – trombone
- Georg Vernon – trombone
- Rolf Backman – alto saxophone
- Arne Domnérus – alto saxophone
- Rolf Blomquist – tenor saxophone, flute
- Bjarne Nerem – tenor saxophone
- Carl-Henrik Norin – tenor saxophone
- Johnny Ekh – baritone saxophone
- Rune Falk – baritone saxophone
- Bengt Hallberg – piano
- Rolf Berg – guitar
- Simon Brehm– bass
- Lars Pettersson – bass
- Egil Johansen – drums
