= The Quintessence =

Studio album by Quincy Jones
- Released: February 1962
- Recorded: November 29, December 18 and 22, 1961
- Studio: Capitol Studios, New York City
- Genre: Jazz
- Length: 30:58
- Label: Impulse!
- Producer: Bob Thiele

Quincy Jones chronology
The Great Wide World of Quincy Jones: Live! (1961)	The Quintessence (1962)	Big Band Bossa Nova (1962)

Professional ratings
Review scores
Source	Rating
AllMusic	4/5 stars
DownBeat	4/5 stars
The Penguin Guide to Jazz Recordings	3/4 stars

The Quintessence is an album by Quincy Jones and his orchestra. It was released in 1962 and was his only album for Impulse! One critic called it "the sound of the modern, progressive big band at its pinnacle."

Jones's band was an outgrowth of the orchestra used in the Broadway show Free and Easy and featured some of the personnel that Jones assembled in New York for the show's European dates.

== Contributors ==
The core band consists of Phil Woods, Melba Liston, Julius Watkins, and bassist Milt Hinton and pianist Patricia Bown on two sessions, with bassist Buddy Catlett and pianist Bobby Scott on another. The trumpet chairs are held alternately by players like Freddie Hubbard, Clark Terry, Thad Jones, and Snooky Young. Oliver Nelson, Frank Wess and Curtis Fuller also contributed.

== Track listing ==
1. The Quintessence (Quincy Jones) - 4:21
2. Robot Portrait (Billy Byers) - 5:25
3. Little Karen (Benny Golson) - 3:44
4. Straight, No Chaser (Thelonious Monk) - 2:26
5. For Lena and Lennie (Jones) - 4:17
6. Hard Sock Dance (Jones) - 3:20
7. Invitation (Bronisław Kaper, Paul Francis Webster) - 3:35
8. The Twitch (Byers) - 3:50

Tracks 5, 8 recorded on November 29, 1961; #2–3, 6 on December 18; 1, 4, 7 on December 22, 1961.

== Personnel ==
Tracks 1, 4, 7

- Phil Woods, Oliver Nelson, Jerome Richardson - saxophone
- Billy Byers, Curtis Fuller, Thomas Mitchell - trombone
- Ernie Royal, Snooky Young, Joe Newman, Thad Jones - trumpet
- Julius Watkins, James Buffington, Earl Chapin, Ray Alonge - French horn
- Harvey Phillips - tuba
- Gloria Agostini - harp
- Patti Bown - piano
- Milt Hinton - bass
- James Johnson - drums

Tracks 2, 3, 6

- Eric Dixon, Frank Wess, Phil Woods, Oliver Nelson - saxophone
- Freddie Hubbard, Al Derisi, Snooky Young, Thad Jones - trumpet
- Melba Liston, Billy Byers, Paul Faulise, Rodney Levitt - trombone
- Julius Watkins - French horn
- Patricia Bown - piano
- Milt Hinton - bass
- Bill English - drums

Tracks 5, 8

- Phil Woods, Eric Dixon, Jerome Richardson - saxophone
- Jerome Kail, Clyde Reasinger, Clark Terry, Joe Newman - trumpet
- Billy Byers, Paul Faulise, Melba Liston - trombone
- Julius Watkins - French horn
- Bobby Scott - piano
- George Catlett - bass
- Stu Martin - drums

== Production ==
- Bob Thiele - producer
- Frank Abbey - engineer
- Pete Turner - cover photograph

== See also ==
- Quincy Jones discography
