= Billberg =

Billberg is a Swedish surname. Notable people with the surname include:

- Gustaf Johan Billberg (1772–1844), Swedish botanist and entomologist
- Rolf Billberg (1930–1966), Swedish alto saxophonist
