= Carl-Henrik Norin =

Swedish saxophonist (1920–1967)

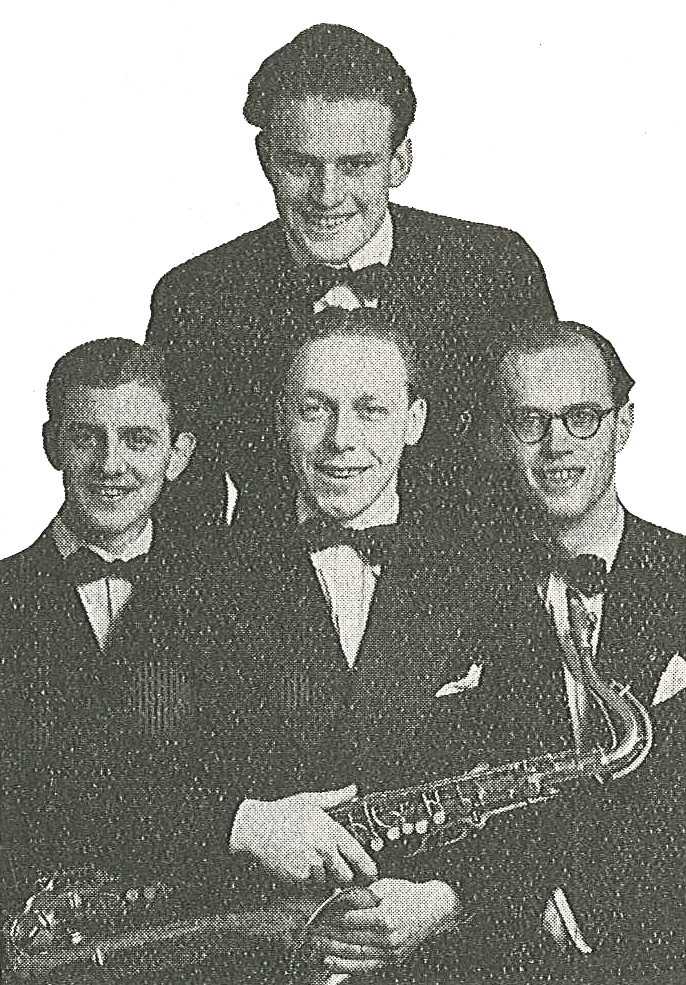
Front row from left: Bertil Frylmark, Norin himself and Ingemar Eriksson. Behind them Simon Brehm.

Carl-Henrik Norin (27 March 1920 – 23 May 1967) was a Swedish jazz saxophonist.

Norin was born in Västerås, and first began playing professionally in the early 1940s, including with Gösta Tönne and Thore Ehrling. As a member of Ehrling's ensemble, he composed the piece "Mississippi Mood". He led a sextet in Stockholm in the 1950s and early 1960s, which played jazz as well as accompanying popular singers such as Bibi Johns; among its sidemen were Jan Allan and Rolf Billberg. He played with, among others, Harry Arnold, Roy Eldridge, Lars Gullin, Peanuts Holland, and Bjarne Nerem. He died in Stockholm.
