= Uppå källarbacken =

Song

Uppå källarbacken is a Swedish folk song, which is used when dancing around the Christmas tree as well as the Midsummerpole.

== Publication ==
- Julens önskesångbok, 1997, under the lines "Tjugondag Knut dansar julen ut", credited as "folksong"

== Recordings ==
An early recording was done by Lily Berglund with Simon Brehm's band on 3 April 1954, released on a record later in April the same year.
