= Lily Berglund =

- Born: 21 July 1928; Kvarnsveden, Sweden
- Died: 15 August 2010 (aged 82) Stockholm, Sweden
- Genres: Schlager
- Occupation: Singer
- Years active: 1943–?

Lily Berglund (Kvarnsveden, 21 July 1928 – Stockholm, 15 August 2010) was a Swedish singer. She was married to Kapellmeister Göte Wilhelmson.

== Discography ==
- Aftonklockor (Evening Chimes) – Dick Harris stora orkester
- Bär du solsken i ditt sinne – Göte Wilhelmsons orkester
- Det är dags för en kyss – Gunnar Wiklund – Dick Harris orkester
- Du är som alla andra (Du bist wie alle anderen) – Willard Ringstrands hammondens
- I denna stund (I Need You) – Simon Brehms orkester
- Botch-a-me – Carl Holmberg – Gösta Theselius Butcher Boys
- Ensam går jag vilse (Can't I) – Knut Edgardts orkester
- Följ med mej (Be my life's companion) – Emil Iwrings orkester
- När vi möts – vi möts i dans (Till I waltz again with you) – Gunnar Svenssons orkester
- Uppå källarbacken - Simon Brehms orkester

== Filmography ==
- 1952 – Bom the Flyer
- 1954 – Thore Ehrling
- 1955 – My Passionate Longing
