= Book of Ballads =

Studio album by Carmen McRae
- Released: 1959
- Recorded: December 1–2, 1958, New York City
- Genre: Vocal jazz
- Length: 40:46
- Label: Kapp KL-1117
- Producer: Frank Hunter

Carmen McRae chronology
| Porgy and Bess (1959) | Book of Ballads (1959) | When You're Away (1959) |

Book of Ballads is a 1959 album by jazz singer Carmen McRae, arranged by Frank Hunter.

Billboard chose the cover of Book of Ballads as their 'Album Cover of the Week' in their January 19, 1959 issue.

== Reception ==
Professional ratings
Review scores
| Source | Rating |
|---|---|
| Allmusic | 4/5 stars |

Allmusic awarded the album four stars and reviewer Jason Ankeny wrote that "The Book of Ballads in question is the Great American Songbook, and Carmen McRae breathes new life into some of its most dog-eared pages on this wonderful session..." Ankney also wrote that McRae's readings of "When I Fall in Love", "Isn't It Romantic?" and "How Long Has This Been Going On?" were sung with "...uncommon care and intelligence, summoning rich new meaning from the familiar lyrics. In her hands, the songs pulse with energy and life." Ankeny praised the album's arranger, Frank Hunter, and pianist Don Abney and his trio for their "...nuanced, evocative backings that afford McRae the necessary space to do her thing."

== Track listing ==
1. "By Myself" (Howard Dietz, Arthur Schwartz) – 3:12
2. "The Thrill Is Gone" (Buddy DeSylva, Ray Henderson) – 3:52
3. "How Long Has This Been Going On" (George Gershwin, Ira Gershwin) – 4:0
4. "Do You Know Why?" (Johnny Burke, Jimmy Van Heusen) – 2:52
5. "My Romance" (Lorenz Hart, Richard Rodgers) – 3:53
6. "Isn't It Romantic?" (Hart, Rodgers) – 3:00
7. "If Love Is Good to Me" (Redd Evans, Fred Spielman) – 3:29
8. "When I Fall In Love" (Edward Heyman, Victor Young) – 3:47
9. "Please Be Kind" (Sammy Cahn, Saul Chaplin) – 3:14
10. "He Was Too Good to Me" (Hart, Rodgers) – 2:41
11. "Angel Eyes" (Earl Brent, Matt Dennis) – 2:41
12. "Something I Dreamed Last Night" (Sammy Fain, Herbert Magidson) – 3:59

== Personnel ==
- Carmen McRae – vocals
- Don Abney – piano
- Joe Benjamin – double bass
- Charlie Smith – drums
- Frank Hunter – arranger, conductor, director
- George Melluso – photographer
