= When You're Away =

Studio album by Carmen McRae
- Released: 1959
- Genre: Jazz
- Length: 40:11
- Label: Kapp

Carmen McRae chronology
Book of Ballads (1958)	When You're Away (1959)	Something to Swing About (1959)

When You're Away is a 1959 studio album by jazz singer Carmen McRae, conducted by Luther Henderson Jr. and Frank Hunter. It was released on vinyl LP on Kapp Records.

== Track listing ==
1. "When You're Away" (Blossom Dearie, Victor Herbert) - 3:14
2. "The More I See You" (Mack Gordon, Harry Warren) - 4:02
3. "I Only Have Eyes for You" (Al Dubin, Harry Warren) - 3:48
4. "Willingly (Melodie Perdue)" (Hubert Giraud, Carl Sigman) - 2:35
5. "If I Could Be With You (One Hour Tonight)" (Henry Creamer, James P. Johnson) - 2:21
6. "I'll Be Seeing You" (Sammy Fain, Irvin Kahal) - 3:42
7. "I Concentrate On You" (Cole Porter) - 3:31
8. "Ain't Misbehavin' " (Harry Brooks, Andy Razaf, Fats Waller) - 3:17
9. "Ev'ry Time We Say Goodbye" (Cole Porter) - 3:02
10. "When Your Lover Has Gone" (Einar Aaron Swan) - 3:32
11. "I'm Glad There Is You" (Sammy Davis Jr., Paul Madeira) - 3:54
12. "Two Faces in the Dark" (Dorothy Fields, Albert Hague) - 3:08

== Reception ==
The initial Billboard magazine review from August 1959 wrote: "The gal hands the tunes a tasteful, clear delivery, and for the most part she sticks to a straight rather than in improvising tack. […] moody stuff with a good bit that's programmable for jocks."
