= Quincy's Got a Brand New Bag =

Studio album by Quincy Jones
- Released: 1965
- Recorded: November 22, 24 & 27, 1965
- Studio: RPM International Studios, Los Angeles, CA
- Genre: Jazz
- Length: 34:09
- Label: Mercury; MG 21063/SR 61063
- Producer: Quincy Jones

Quincy Jones chronology
The Slender Thread (1965)	Quincy's Got a Brand New Bag (1965)	Walk, Don't Run (1966)

Quincy's Got a Brand New Bag is a studio album by record producer, arranger and musician, Quincy Jones, featuring instrumental arrangements of contemporary pop/R&B hits which was recorded in late 1965 at RPM International Studios and engineered in part by Ray Charles, who performed on many tracks.

== Track listing ==
1. "Ain't That Peculiar" (Pete Moore, Smokey Robinson, Bobby Rogers, Marv Tarplin)— 2:52
2. "I Got You (I Feel Good)" (James Brown) — 3:41
3. "I Hear A Symphony" (Lamont Dozier, Eddie Holland) — 3:08
4. "A Lover's Concerto" (Sandy Linzer, Denny Randell) — 2:23
5. "Baby Cakes" (Jones) — 4:06
6. "Mohair Sam" (Dallas Frazier) — 2:13
7. "Something About You" (Holland-Dozier-Holland) — 3:03
8. "Boss Bird" (Bobby Scott) — 3:21
9. "Hang on Sloopy" (Bert Russell, Wes Farrell) — 2:14
10. "Fever" (Eddie Cooley, John Davenport) — 2:25
11. "Harlem Nocturne" (Earle Hagen, Dick Rogers) — 2:37
12. "Papa's Got a Brand New Bag" (Brown) — 2:11

== Personnel ==
On tracks 1, 2, 4, 5, 6, 7, 10, 12:

- Bobby Bryant — Trumpet
- Jack Kelso — Alto saxophone
- Plas Johnson — Tenor Saxophone
- Jewel Grant — Baritone Saxophone
- Urbie Green — Trombone
- Kenny Schroyer — Bass Trombone
- Carol Kaye — Bass
- René Hall — Guitar
- Arthur Knight — Guitar
- Ray Charles — Piano and Organ
- Mike Rubini — Piano and Organ
- Gary Coleman — Percussion

On tracks 3, 8, 9, 11:

- Bobby Scott — Leader and Piano
- Jerome Richardson — Tenor Saxophone and Flute
- Joe Newman — Trumpet
- Grady Tate — Drums
- Ben Tucker — Bass
- Ray Barretto — Conga Drum and Bongos

On all tracks:

Engineers: Ray Charles, Joe Adams, Rudy Hill
