= Ove Lind =

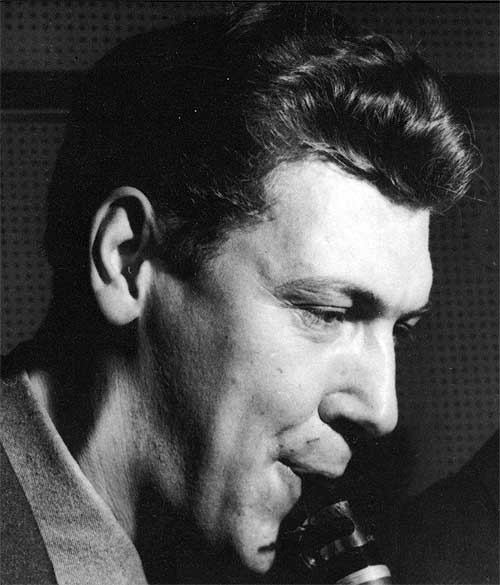
Ove Lind c. 1956

Ove Lind (June 29, 1926, Stockholm - April 16, 1991, Stockholm) was a Swedish jazz clarinetist.

Lind first played professionally with Simon Brehm and Thore Swanerud in 1949. He was a member of the Swinging Swedes in 1952-1954, then cofounded a group with Gunnar Almstedt in 1954 which featured Bengt Hallberg and toured as Alice Babs's supporting group. He released many albums in the 1960s and 1970s which showed the influence of Benny Goodman, and played with Teddy Wilson in 1970. In addition to his work in jazz, Lind also accompanied other Swedish musicians, especially in the late 1950s and early 1960s.
