= Nils Lindberg =

Swedish composer and pianist (1933–2022)

Nils Lindberg (11 June 1933 – 20 February 2022) was a Swedish composer and pianist.

== Biography ==
Lindberg was born in Uppsala on 11 June 1933. He was known both as a jazz composer and musician, but was also active in other styles. Several of his works are written in a style combining elements of jazz, Swedish folk music and classical music.

He studied musicology at Uppsala University from 1952 to 1956 and then composition at the Royal College of Music, Stockholm, from 1956 to 1960. "While still a student he began playing professionally with" Benny Bailey (1957–8), Anders Burman (1958), Ove Lind (1959), Lars Gullin, and Putte Wickman. He played with a touring Duke Ellington in 1973 and recorded with vocalist Karin Krog in 1976.

Lindberg died on 20 February 2022, at the age of 88.

== Discography ==
Year recorded	Title	Label	Notes
1960	Sax Appeal	Barben	Some tracks quintet, some tracks septet; with Rolf Billberg (alto sax), Harry Backlund and Allan Lundstrom (tenor sax), Lars Gullin (baritone sax), Sture Nordin (bass), Conny Svensson (drums)
1962	Trisection		Most tracks with Idrees Sulieman and Jan Allan (trumpet), Sven-Olof Walldoff (bass trumpet), Eje Thelin (trombone), Olle Holmqvist (tuba), Rolf Billberg (alto sax), Bertil Lofdahl and Harry Backlund (tenor sax), Erik Nilsson (baritone sax), Sture Nordin (bass), Sture Kallin (drums)
1970	Contradictions (Club Jazz 1)		
1972	7 dalmålningar	Swedish Society Discofil	
1975	Reflections		
1979	Saxes Galore		
1981	Brass Galore		
1984	Big Band Galore		
1990	O Mistress Mine	Border	
1993	Melody in Blue	Border	
1994	Requiem	Naxos	
1995	Alone with My Melodies	Border	Solo piano
1998	A Church Blues for Alice	Sony	
2000	Third Saxes Galore	Prophone	
2002	The Sky, the Flower and a Lark	Proprius	
2008	As We Are	Prophone	With Margareta Bengtson (vocals), Jan Allan (trumpet), Anders Paulsson (soprano sax), Saxes Galore

=== As arranger ===
- Swedish Folk Tunes from Dalecarlia - Andrew Canning, church organ, Uppsala Cathedral Choir, Milke Falck Proprius, PRSACD 2032 (2004)
- Timeless - Dalecarlian Paintings - Jan Allan, trumpet, Putte Wickman, clarinet, Arne Domnérus, alto saxophone, Bjarne Nerem, tenor saxophone, Anders Lindskog, tenor saxophone, Erik Nilsson, baritone saxophone, Torgny Nilsson, trombone, Jan Allan, trumpet, alto horn, Nils Lindberg, piano, organ, conductor, Björn Alke, bass, Sture Nordin, bass, Roman Dylag, bass, Fredrik Norén, drums, Nils-Erik Slörner, drums, The Fresk Quartet, Sockentrio from Rattvik, Swedish Radio Orchestra Prophone, PCD 081 (2005)
- Speglingar - Mytologiska bilder Anders Paulson, soprano saxophone, Dalasinfoniettan, Bjarne Engeset Swedish Society Discofil, SCD 1140 (2008)

== Bibliography ==
- As You are, Music Memories (2006), Swedish, 168 pages, Stockholm: Svenskt visarkiv, Jazz Department at The Centre for Swedish Folk Music and Jazz Research, 0281-5567; 17 ISBN 91-85374-43-1
