= Big Band Bossa Nova (Quincy Jones album) =

Studio album by Quincy Jones
- Released: December 20, 1962
- Recorded: June 15, 1962 – September 8, 1962
- Studio: A&R Studios, New York City
- Genre: Bossa Nova; Jazz; exotica; latin
- Length: 35:02
- Label: Mercury
- Producer: Quincy Jones

Quincy Jones chronology
The Quintessence (1961)	Big Band Bossa Nova (1962)	Quincy Jones Plays Hip Hits (1963)

Professional ratings
Review scores
Source	Rating
AllMusic	3/5 stars
New Record Mirror	5/5 stars

Big Band Bossa Nova is an album by American composer Quincy Jones.

== Track listing ==
#	Title	Writers	Length
1	"Soul Bossa Nova"	Quincy Jones	2:44
2	"Boogie Bossa Nova"	Charles Mingus	2:41
3	"Desafinado"	Antônio Carlos Jobim, Newton Mendonça	2:53
4	"Manhã de Carnaval (Morning Of The Carnival)"	Luiz Bonfá, Antonio Maria	2:55
5	"Se É Tarde Me Perdoa (Forgive Me If I'm Late)"	Ronaldo Bôscoli, Carlos Lyra	4:21
6	"On the Street Where You Live"	Frederick Loewe, Alan Jay Lerner	2:32
7	"One Note Samba (Samba De Uma Nota So)"	Antônio Carlos Jobim, Newton Mendonça	2:00
8	"Lalo Bossa Nova"	Lalo Schifrin	3:12
9	"Serenata"	Leroy Anderson, Mitchell Parish	3:18
10	"Chega de Saudade (No More Blues)"	Antônio Carlos Jobim, Vinicius de Moraes	5:30
11	"A Taste of Honey" (CD extra on some pressings)	Bobby Scott, Ric Marlow	2:56

== Performers ==
- Quincy Jones – conductor, arranger
- Phil Woods – alto saxophone
- Paul Gonsalves – tenor saxophone
- Roland Kirk – flute, alto flute
- Jerome Richardson – flute, alto flute, woodwinds
- Clark Terry – trumpet, flugelhorn
- Julius Watkins – French horn
- Alan Raph – bass trombone
- Lalo Schifrin – piano
- Jim Hall – guitar
- Chris White – bass
- Rudy Collins – drums
- Jack Del Rio – percussion
- Carlos Gomez – percussion
- Jose Paula – percussion

Recording engineer: Phil Ramone
