= Quincy Jones Explores the Music of Henry Mancini =

Studio album by Quincy Jones
- Released: 1964
- Recorded: February 5–6, 1964
- Studio: A & R Recording
- Genre: Jazz
- Length: 37:45
- Label: Mercury
- Producer: Quincy Jones

Quincy Jones chronology
Quincy Jones Plays Hip Hits (1963)	Quincy Jones Explores the Music of Henry Mancini (1964)	Golden Boy (1964)

Professional ratings
Review scores
Source	Rating
Allmusic	4/5 stars

Quincy Jones Explores the Music of Henry Mancini is an album by Quincy Jones that contains music composed by Henry Mancini.

== Track listing ==
All music composed by Henry Mancini, lyricists indicated

1. "Baby Elephant Walk" – 2:49
2. "Charade" (Johnny Mercer) – 3:15
3. "Dreamsville" (Ray Evans, Jay Livingston) – 3:48
4. "Bird Brain" – 4:06
5. "Days of Wine and Roses" (Mercer) – 2:42
6. "Mr. Lucky" – 2:24
7. "The Pink Panther Theme" – 3:35
8. "(I Love You and) Don't You Forget It" (Al Stillman) – 2:51
9. "Soldier in the Rain" – 3:09
10. "Odd Ball" – 3:43
11. "Moon River" (Mercer) – 2:31
12. "The Theme from Peter Gunn" – 2:52

== Personnel ==
- Quincy Jones – arranger, conductor
- John Bello – trumpet
- Jimmy Maxwell – trumpet
- Ernie Royal – trumpet
- Clark Terry – trumpet
- Snooky Young – trumpet
- Billy Byers – trombone
- Urbie Green – trombone
- Richard Hixson – trombone
- Quentin Jackson – trombone
- Tony Studd – trombone
- George Berg – saxophone
- Walter Kane – saxophone
- Rahsaan Roland Kirk – saxophone, flute
- Romeo Penque – saxophone
- Seldon Powell – saxophone
- Jerome Richardson – saxophone
- Stanley Webb – saxophone
- Phil Woods – saxophone
- Zoot Sims – saxophone
- Ray Alonge – French horn
- James Buffington – French horn
- Tony Miranda – French horn
- Bob Northern – French horn
- Toots Thielemans – guitar, harmonica, whistle
- Vinnie Bell – guitar
- Mundell Lowe – guitar
- Margaret Ross – harp
- Gary Burton – vibraphone
- Bobby Scott – piano
- Major Holley – double bass
- Milt Hinton – double bass
- Philip Kraus – percussion
- Martin Grupp – percussion
- Osie Johnson – drums
