= From Q with Love =

Compilation album by Quincy Jones
- Released: February 9, 1999
- Recorded: 1966–1999
- Genre: Jazz
- Length: 119:19
- Label: Warner Bros.
- Producer: Quincy Jones, Sonny Burke

Quincy Jones chronology
Q's Jook Joint (1995)	From Q with Love (1999)	Basie and Beyond (2000)

From Q with Love is a two volume compilation album by Quincy Jones. It was released on February 9, 1999, through Warner Bros. Records.

Professional ratings
Review scores
Source	Rating
Allmusic	2.5/5 stars

== Track listing ==
Volume 1
#	Title	Guest(s)	Time
1	"Setembro (Brazilian Wedding Song)"	Sarah Vaughan, Take 6	5:03
2	"The Secret Garden (Sweet Seduction Suite)"	Barry White, James Ingram, Al B. Sure!, El DeBarge, Siedah Garrett	6:39
3	"I'm Yours"	Siedah Garrett, El DeBarge	4:22
4	"Baby, Come to Me"	Patti Austin, James Ingram	3:36
5	"You Put a Move on My Heart"	Tamia	6:13
6	"Velas"	Toots Thielemans	4:04
7	"Moody's Mood for Love"	James Moody, Brian McKnight, Take 6, Rachelle Ferrell	4:19
8	"Liberian Girl"	Michael Jackson	3:49
9	"Love Dance"	George Benson	3:18
10	"One Hundred Ways"	James Ingram	4:18
11	"Rock with You"	Brandy, Heavy D	4:09
12	"The Lady In My Life"	Michael Jackson	4:58
13	"The Shadow of Your Smile (Love Theme from the Sandpiper)"	Frank Sinatra, Count Basie & His Orchestra	2:54

Volume 2
#	Title	Guest(s)	Time
1	"How Do You Keep the Music Playing?"	James Ingram, Patti Austin	4:14
2	"Something I Cannot Have"	Catero	3:47
3	"Human Nature"	Michael Jackson	4:06
4	"Everything Must Change"	Benard Ighner	5:59
5	"I'm Gonna Miss You In The Morning"	Luther Vandross, Patti Austin	3:32
6	"Everything"	Tevin Campbell	4:06
7	"Just Once"	James Ingram	4:33
8	"If This Time Is The Last Time"	Patti Austin	4:43
9	"Somewhere"	Aretha Franklin	6:16
10	"Heaven's Girl"	R. Kelly, Ron Isley, Aaron Hall, Charlie Wilson, Naomi Campbell	4:55
11	"Prelude To The Garden"		0:54
12	"Sax In The Garden"	Barry White, Kirk Whalum	6:39
13	"At The End Of The Day (Grace)"	Toots Thielemans, Barry White, Mervyn Warren	8:02

== See also ==
- Quincy Jones discography
