= Rolf Billberg =

- Born: 22 August 1930; Lund, Sweden
- Died: 17 August 1966 (aged 35) Gothenburg, Sweden
- Genres: Bebop
- Instrument(s): Alto saxophone (primary); Tenor saxophone, Clarinet
- Years active: 1950s—1960s
- Formerly of: Simon Brehm, Lars Gullin, Ib Glindemann, Carl-Henrik Norin, Nils Lindberg

Rolf Billberg (22 August 1930 – 17 August 1966) was a Swedish alto saxophone player active during the 1950s and 1960s.

== Biography ==
Rolf Billberg was born in Lund, Sweden, on 22 August 1930 and was raised by his mother in Gothenburg. At age 17, Billberg began playing clarinet and performed with an Uddevalla military band for four years. He then made the switch to the tenor saxophone and worked with local bands in Visby, Borås and Gothenburg, going to Stockholm in 1954 to join the Simon Brehm orchestra. From 1954–1955, Billberg worked with Lars Gullin and recorded with him. In 1955, he worked in Copenhagen, Denmark with the Lasse Wanderyd orchestra and later for the Ib Glindemann orchestra in 1956. From 1956–1957, Billberg was performing in various American clubs located in Germany and France with vibraphonist Vera Auer. It was during this period that Billberg switched to alto saxophone.

In 1957, he began working with the Carl-Henrik Norin orchestra in Stockholm. Over the coming years, he would work frequently in Copenhagen with groups such as the Jazz Quintet 60 and the Danish Radio Jazz Orchestra. Back in Sweden, he continued his work with Gullin and also worked frequently with trumpet player Jan Allan. In 1966, he joined the Danish Radio Big Band (led by Ib Glindemann), spending the summer in Gothenburg helping to look after his mother's hotel in the city. There he became seriously ill and died on his way to the hospital on 17 August 1966.

The liner notes to the CD Rare Danish Recordings 1956-1957 states that:

According to the most credible jazz witnesses in Denmark and Sweden...Billberg was an extroverted artist with a gluttonous appetite for life and all it has to offer – including intoxicants, which came to affect both his emotional and physical health - but never stopped his love of playing in all tempos and keys.

Music broadcaster Peter H. Larsen has drawn comparisons between Billberg's lyricism and that of Lee Konitz.

== Discography ==
- 1955-1956: Lars Gullin with Chet Baker, Vol. 1 (1955) Dragon Records
- Great Lars Gullin, Vol. 1 (1955) Dragon Records
- Sax Appeal & Trisection (1963) by Nils Lindberg (Dragon Records)
- 1944-1955, Vol. 3: Late Summer (1995) by Lars Gullin (Dragon Records)
- Symphony No. 1 & Jazz From Studio A (1998) by Nils Lindberg (Dragon Records)
- 50 Years on Stage (2002) by Ib Glindemann (Edel Mega)
- Stan Kenton with the Danish Radio Big Band (2003) Storyville Records
- Darn That Dream (2002) Dragon Records
- Brand New! Swedish Jazz, Vol. 9: 1960-1964 (2004) Caprice Records
- Rare Danish Recordings 1956-1957 (2005) Storyville Records
- Altosupremo (2007) Anagram Records
