= Something to Swing About =

Studio album by Carmen McRae
- Released: 1960
- Recorded: November 10–12, 1959, New York City
- Genre: Vocal jazz
- Length: 29:12
- Label: Kapp Records

Carmen McRae chronology
When You're Away (1959)	Something to Swing About (1960)	Tonight Only! (1961)

Something to Swing About is a 1960 album by jazz singer Carmen McRae, arranged by Ernie Wilkins. It was released by Kapp Records on vinyl LP.

== Reception ==
Professional ratings
Review scores
Source	Rating
Allmusic	3.5/5 stars

The initial Billboard magazine review from January 1960 wrote that "McRae fans are going to like this and the gal can easily make herself new friend with the set. ...This is Miss McRae in top form". Allmusic gave the album 3 and a half stars out of 5.

== Track listing ==
1. "Three Little Words" (Harry Ruby, Bert Kalmar) - 1:51
2. "I Couldn't Care Less" (Rogers L. Simon) - 2:24
3. "That's for Me" (Richard Rodgers, Oscar Hammerstein II) - 2:45
4. "How Little We Know" (Philip Springer, Carolyn Leigh) - 2:28
5. "You Leave Me Breathless" (Frederick Hollander, Ralph Freed) - 2:37
6. "It's Love" (Leonard Bernstein, Betty Comden, Adolph Green) - 2:56
7. "Love Is a Simple Thing" (Arthur Siegel, June Carroll) - 2:03
8. "Comes Love" (Sam H. Stept, Lew Brown, Charles Tobias) - 2:43
9. "A Sleepin' Bee" (Harold Arlen, Truman Capote) - 2:27
10. "I See Your Face Before Me" (Arthur Schwartz, Howard Dietz) - 2:21
11. "Alone Together" (Arthur Schwartz, Howard Dietz) - 2:19
12. "Falling in Love with Love" (Richard Rodgers, Lorenz Hart) - 2:10

== Personnel ==
- Carmen McRae – vocals
- Ernie Wilkins – arranger, musical director
- Vinnie Dean, Porter Kilbert, Phil Woods – alto saxophone
- Budd Johnson, Zoot Sims – tenor saxophone
- Vinny Victor, Sol Schlinger – baritone saxophone
- Richard Williams, Al Stewart, Art Farmer, Lennie Johnson, Jimmy Maxwell, Ernie Royal – trumpet
- Billy Byers, Jimmy Cleveland, Mickey Gravine, Urbie Green, Frank Rehak – trombone
- Paul Fauline – bass trombone
- Dick Katz – piano
- Tommy Williams – double bass
- Floyd Williams, Don Lamond – drums
