= I Dig Dancers =

Studio album by Quincy Jones
- Released: 1961
- Recorded: February 27 & 29, April 21; October 19, 1960
- Studio: Barclay (Paris); Bell Sound (New York City)
- Genre: Jazz
- Label: Mercury
- Producer: Hal Mooney

Quincy Jones chronology
The Great Wide World of Quincy Jones (1959)	I Dig Dancers (1961)	The Quintessence (1962)

I Dig Dancers is an album Quincy Jones that was released by Mercury with performances recorded in Paris and New York City.

== Reception ==
Professional ratings
Review scores
Source	Rating
AllMusic	3/5 stars

AllMusic awarded the album 3 stars.

== Track listing ==
1. "Pleasingly Plump" (Quincy Jones) - 2:15
2. "G'wan Train" (Patti Bown) - 6:20
3. "Moonglow" (Will Hudson, Irving Mills, Eddie DeLange) - 2:47
4. "Tone Poem" (Melba Liston) - 3:40
5. "You Turned the Tables on Me" (Louis Alter, Sidney D. Mitchell) - 2:30
6. "Chinese Checkers" (David Carr Glover) - 2:41
7. "Love Is Here to Stay" (George Gershwin, Ira Gershwin) - 3:10
8. "The Midnight Sun Will Never Set" (Quincy Jones, Henri Salvador, Dorcas Cochran) - 4:29
9. "Trouble On My Mind" (Ray Noble) - 2:51
10. "A Sunday Kind of Love" (Louis Prima, Barbara Belle, Anita Leonard, Stan Rhodes) - 2:32

Bonus tracks on CD reissue:

11. "Parisian Thoroughfare" (Bud Powell) - 3:50
12. "Pleasingly Plump" [First Take] (Jones) - 2:29
13. "G'wan Train" [Short Version] (Bown) - 3:00
14. "Close Your Eyes" (Bernice Petkere) - 2:07
15. "Blues from Free and Easy" (Harold Arlen, Johnny Mercer) - 2:00

== Personnel ==
- Quincy Jones - arranger, conductor
- Benny Bailey, Freddie Hubbard, Lennie Johnson, Jerry Kail, Clyde Reasinger, Floyd Standifer, Clark Terry - trumpet
- Wayne Andre, Curtis Fuller, Jimmy Cleveland, Quentin Jackson, Melba Liston, Åke Persson - trombone
- Julius Watkins - French horn
- Joe Lopes, Porter Kilbert, Phil Woods - alto saxophone
- Budd Johnson, Oliver Nelson, Jerome Richardson - tenor saxophone
- Sahib Shihab - baritone saxophone
- Patti Bown - piano
- Les Spann - guitar, flute
- Buddy Catlett - bass
- Joe Harris, Stu Martin - drums
