= Millie Bown Russell =

American educator

- Mildred Bown (Millie L. B. Russell), from the 1948 yearbook of Seattle University
- Born: Mildred Louise Bown; October 29, 1926; Seattle, Washington
- Died: November 1, 2021 (age 95); Seattle, Washington
- Occupation: Educator
- Relatives: Patti Bown (sister)

Millie Louise Bown Russell (October 29, 1926 – November 1, 2021) was an American health educator and college administrator based in Seattle. Much of her work as an administrator at the University of Washington involved expanding opportunities for minority students in the STEM pipeline.

== Early life and education ==
Millie Bown was raised in the Seattle area, the daughter of Augustus Bown and Edith Ruth Cahill Bown. Her parents were politically active, and welcomed Paul Robeson and Marian Anderson as guests in their home. One of her sisters was jazz pianist Patti Bown.

Bown was an athletic young woman, and especially excelled at archery and dance in her teens. She earned a bachelor's degree in medical technology from Seattle University in 1948. She was the second Black student to enroll, after Sam Smith, and the first to graduate. In 1971 Russell earned a teaching certificate from the same school. She earned a master's degree in kinesiology in 1978 from the University of Washington, and completed doctoral studies in education at the University of Washington when she was 62 years old, in 1988.

Bown became a member of Alpha Kappa Alpha in 1945. She represented the Seattle Youth Council of the NAACP at a national meeting in New Orleans in 1946. "Civil rights was important, and that was my volunteer work," she recalled later, "but I also liked health care and I liked making precise decisions about what is important for a person’s health care needs."

== Career ==
Russell trained hematologists at the King County Central Blood Bank and the Puget Sound Regional Blood Center. Beginning in 1974, she worked at the University of Washington, as director of the pre-professional program for minority students interested in healthcare careers. She also taught biology courses and was assistant to the university's vice president in the Office of Minority Affairs. She founded the school's Early Scholars Outreach Program, and helped to develop the Ron McNair Seattle Science Center Camp-in event.

Russell received the Charles E. Odegaard Award in 1981, for her work on behalf of minority students in STEM fields. In 1989, she ran for a seat on the Seattle School Board. "The factors for an effective school are well-known," she said in a newspaper interview that year. "We just have to be willing to design it. If we don't really invest in that, we're not really caring about America." October 29, 2001, her 75th birthday, was declared Dr. Millie Russell Day by the Mayor of Seattle. She retired from the university in 2007.

== Personal life and legacy ==
Millie Bown married Edward A. Russell Jr. in 1952. They had three children, Pat, Peter, and Paul. Her husband died in 2007, and Russell died in 2021, at the age of 95, in Seattle. The Dr. Millie Russell Endowed Scholarship aat the University of Washington is named in her honor, and it "benefits underrepresented, low-income, first-generation students interested in studying science". Her daughter Pat Russell is Executive Dean of the Healthcare and Human Services division at Seattle Central College.
