= Patti Bown =

American musician (1931–2008)

Patti Bown (July 26, 1931, Seattle, Washington – March 21, 2008, Media, Pennsylvania) was an American jazz pianist, composer, and singer.

== Early life and education ==
Patricia Anne Bown was born in Seattle, the daughter of Augustus Bown and Edith Ruth Cahill Bown. Her father worked as a chef on the railroad, and her mother as a beautician. They met in Canada, then relocated to Seattle's Central District to raise their seven children. The family was Catholic, and young Patti did chores to help out the nuns who lived in a nearby enclosed Carmelite convent.

Bown grew up in a household that valued music and Black culture. Edith, herself a pianist and a Fisk University graduate, brought her children to see performances by Marian Anderson, Katherine Dunham, and Arthur Rubenstein. Bown recalled her recounting stories of their grandmother's escape from slavery. Bown's sister, Edith Bown Valentine, was a classical pianist; another sister, Millie Bown Russell, became known for her work on diversity in STEM education.

Bown began playing piano at two years old; she startled her parents with her ability to play Duke Ellington songs by ear after hearing them on the radio. She began to take lessons with a local piano teacher when she was six years old, from whom she learned to read music.

As a teenager, Bown got involved with the Jackson Street jazz scene. She became friends with Quincy Jones, who called her a "child prodigy." After meeting Ray Charles at Seattle's Washington Social Club, he tutored her in the art of accompanying a jazz vocalist.

Bown attended Seattle University on a music scholarship before transferring to the University of Washington. She also played in local orchestras, including the Seattle Symphony, which had awarded her first prize in a contest for young musicians.

In 1953, she became a member of Seattle's Black musicians' union, the American Federation of Musicians Local 458.

== Career ==
Bown moved to New York City in 1956. She described her experience starting out in the city's jazz scene as "very frustrating," with her ability to play in clubs limited to sitting in at the Five Spot. After joining the musicians' union local 802, she found work as a soloist, playing early on in sessions with Billy Eckstine and Jimmy Rushing. Her ability to sight-read and improvise made her a valuable session musician.

Bown released one album under her own name, Patti Bown Plays Big Piano, in 1958 for the Columbia label. Joe Benjamin played bass on the record, along with Ed Shaughnessy on drums. Bown composed four of the album tracks. One number, G'Won Train, was inspired by the beauty of an early morning walk home after staying up all night talking with other musicians, among them the saxophonist Ike Quebec. G'Won Train was covered by Quincy Jones, Jimmy Smith, and others.

In 1959 Bown was invited by Quincy Jones to join his orchestra for a ten-month European tour of Harold Arlen's musical Free and Easy. She was one of two women in the band, alongside trombonist Melba Liston. Other musicians on that tour included Jimmy Cleveland, Aake Persson, Quentin Jackson, Julius Watkins, Phil Woods, Sahib Shihab, Porter Kilbert, Jerome Richardson, Budd Johnson, Buddy Catlett, Les Spann, Joe Harris, Floyd Standifer, and Clark Terry. While on this tour she also played with Bill Coleman in Paris.

Bown went on to record with Gene Ammons, Oliver Nelson, Cal Massey, Duke Ellington, Roland Kirk, George Russell, Benny Carter, Charles Mingus, Sonny Stitt, Illinois Jacquet and Harry Sweets Edison. As part of Ant Farmer's New York Jazz Sextet, she recorded John Coltrane's "Giant Steps" for a 1966 album.

Bown's musical compositions were recorded by Sarah Vaughan, Benny Golson, and Duke Ellington. She recorded with soul musicians such as Aretha Franklin, Nina Simone, and James Brown, and collaborated with notable lyricists like Maya Angelou and Buddy Bernier.

She was sometimes met with sexism in the male-dominated jazz scene, and was accustomed to being underestimated because she was a woman. When met with hostility or disrespect in the recording studio, she said, "I just went ahead and played." After an audition for Benny Goodman's orchestra, Bown was informed by the music director that although she played well, Goodman refused to hire women.

Between 1962 and 1964, she served as the musical director for the bands accompanying Dinah Washington and Sarah Vaughan. As part of Washington's band, she traveled south to Mississippi and Tampa in support of Dr. Martin Luther King, Jr. and the NAACP.

In the 1970s, Bown worked as a pianist in pit orchestras on Broadway and composed for film and television. She was the music director for Joseph Papp's production of Derek Walcott's play Ti-Jean and His Brothers. She also performed off-Broadway, including in Woodie King, Jr.'s play Christchild (1992) and with Lynne Thigpen in And I Ain't Finished Yet (1981).

Over the course of her career, Bown played in concert at Carnegie Hall, at the North Sea Jazz Festival, and the Spoleto Festival. She also returned to Seattle to perform, notably in a 1993 show at the Museum of History and Industry. In New York City, she played regularly at the Village Gate nightclub for many years.

Bown taught at Bennington College in the Bennington Jazz Lab, and at Rutgers University. She was honored with a lifetime achievement award from International Women in Jazz in 1996, and received the Mary Lou Williams Women in Jazz award in 2006. In 2007, she was recognized by the Jazz Foundation of America at its Apollo Theater gala.

== Musical style and critical reception ==
As a pianist and composer, Bown's tastes were eclectic. Her style ran the gamut from stride to avant-garde jazz. She cited Duke Ellington, Erroll Garner and Arthur Rubenstein as among her major influences.

Duke Ellington told DownBeat that "what she's got is a unique potion. It's there, and it's that, and that's it, baby." New Yorker jazz critic Whitney Balliett wrote that her solos could provide "an eight-minute lesson in how to make a piece of improvisation so tight and complex it would supply a dozen soloists for a week." In the New York Times, John S. Wilson cited her "strong, adventurous approach" and "unusual harmonic imagination."

== Personal life ==
Bown lived in the Westbeth artist housing complex in Greenwich Village for 37 years, beginning in 1973. She was close friends with her neighbors at Westbeth, including the actor and director Pawnee Sills and artist Sherry Lane. Westbeth resident and fellow musician Nasheet Waits remembered her as "joyful and caring" but "all business when it came to the bandstand."

She had one son, Anthony Gallagher, born in 1956.

== Death and legacy ==
Patti Bown died in a nursing home in Media, Pennsylvania in 2008 due to kidney failure and complications of diabetes. She was 76.

Bown's papers are held in the collection of the New York Public Library's Schomburg Center for Research in Black Culture.

== Discography ==
With Gene Ammons

- Up Tight! (Prestige, 1961)
- Boss Soul! (Prestige, 1961)
- Soul Summit Vol. 2 (Prestige, 1962)
- Late Hour Special (Prestige, 1962 [1964])
- The Soulful Moods of Gene Ammons (Moodsville, 1962)
- Sock! (Prestige, 1962 [1965])

With Billy Byers

- Impressions of Duke Ellington (Mercury, 1961)

With Art Farmer

- New York Jazz Sextet: Group Therapy (Scepter, 1966)

With Etta Jones

- Lonely and Blue (Prestige, 1962)

With Quincy Jones

- The Birth of a Band! (Mercury, 1959)
- The Great Wide World of Quincy Jones (Mercury, 1959)
- I Dig Dancers (Mercury, 1960)
- Quincy Plays for Pussycats (Mercury, 1959-65 [1965])

With Cal Massey

- Blues to Coltrane (Candid, 1961 [1987])

With Oliver Nelson

- Afro/American Sketches (Prestige, 1962)
- Fantabulous (Argo, 1964)
- The Spirit of '67 with Pee Wee Russell (Impulse!, 1967)
- Jazzhattan Suite (Verve, 1967)

With Cal Tjader

- Warm Wave (Verve, 1964)
- Hip Vibrations (Verve, 1967)

With Big Joe Turner

- Singing the Blues (BluesWay, 1967)

With Dave Van Ronk

- Songs for Ageing Children (Cadet, 1973)

With Roswell Rudd

- Blown Bone (Philips, 1979)

With Eddie "Cleanhead" Vinson

- Cherry Red (BluesWay, 1967)

With Dinah Washington

- I Wanna Be Loved (Mercury, 1961)
- Dinah Washington Sings Fats Waller (EmArcy, 1957)
