= Frank Hunter (musician) =

American trombonist and bandleader (1919–2005)

- Also known as: Frank Huntermark; Francisco Cazador
- Born: Frank Theodore Hundertmark; October 19, 1919; Philadelphia, Pennsylvania, U.S.
- Died: December 15, 2005 (aged 86)
- Genres: Big band, exotica, pop
- Occupations: Musician, arranger, bandleader
- Instrument: Trombone

Frank Theodore Hundertmark (October 19, 1919 – December 15, 2005), known as Frank Hunter, was an American trombonist, bandleader and music arranger. He is now best known for his 1959 exotica album White Goddess. Early in his career he used the name Frank Huntermark, and on some recordings of Latin American music he was credited as Francisco Cazador ("cazador" being Spanish for "hunter").

== Biography ==
Born and brought up in the Germantown area of Philadelphia, Hunter attended Mastbaum Vocational High School. He began as a professional musician in jazz bands in and around the area. In 1940 he began playing in the house band at radio station WCAU, before touring with Al Donahue. In World War II, he scored revues, and arranged shows for the West Point Band.

After the war, as Frank Huntermark, he joined Elliot Lawrence's orchestra where he worked as an arranger, later competing for the role with the younger Gerry Mulligan. He appeared in, and arranged for, Paul Whiteman's TV Teen Club in the early 1950s. According to Whiteman's biographer Don Rayno, Hunter's "arranging ability was legendary – he could arrange, without piano, while the band was playing another song, spreading out the parts on the floor, working on a moment's notice when necessary."

At Jubilee Records in 1955, he recorded the album Sounds of the Hunter. In 1956, he toured as trombonist with the Tex Beneke Band, before starting work as a full-time arranger. He worked as an arranger for Bethlehem Records, with singer Frances Faye, trumpeter Howard McGhee, and others. He went on to work for several other record labels in the mid-1950s, including Mercury, Medallion, and Top Rank, and with musicians including Johnny Hartman, Coleman Hawkins, Gerry Mulligan, Carmen McRae, Eddie Fisher, and Eddie Heywood.

His work for Kapp Records in the late 1950s included arrangements for Roger Williams, Jane Morgan, Joe Harnell, Anita Darian, and Hoagy Carmichael, as well as the 1958 album Great Melodies From The Motion Pictures. His own project on Kapp, White Goddess, "combines original compositions and standards, orchestrated and arranged for an unusual combination of instruments" including Ondioline, chromatic bongos, Chinese bells, and the "buzzimba". The result has been described as "something of a cross-over between jungle exotica and space music and right up there with the very best in both categories". Because of both its quality and scarcity to collectors, the album "has been compared to the Holy Grail by exotica fans".

After leaving Kapp around 1960, Hunter worked on arrangements on labels including Everest, Chancellor, Epic, Columbia, Reprise, and RCA Victor. In 1961, as Francisco Cazador, he released the album The Passionate Valentino Tangos on Reprise. Musicians and singers with whom he worked in the 1960s included Bobby Hackett, Tutti Camarata, Frankie Avalon, Robert Goulet, Georgia Gibbs, Erma Franklin, Anita Bryant, Ed Ames, Pat Boone, Leo Diamond, Ketty Lester, Della Reese, Gloria Lynne, and Chad and Jeremy. He also contributed to a series of box sets for Columbia, presenting arrangements of the past year's pop music hits.

By the mid-1960s, his style of arrangements had become less fashionable, but he continued to contribute to commercials, and between 1973 and 1975 was musical director for The Mike Douglas Show. He also arranged for brass bands, choirs, and symphony orchestras. He taught at the University of Hartford, Connecticut, for two years in the late 1970s. Some years after retiring, Hunter was called upon again in 2001 to contribute arrangements for the continuing Glenn Miller Orchestra.

Hunter died in 2005 at the age of 86.
