= Golden Boy (Quincy Jones album) =

Studio album by Quincy Jones
- Released: 1964
- Recorded: September 15, 1964
- Studio: National Recording Studios, New York City
- Genre: Jazz
- Length: 35:20
- Label: Mercury
- Producer: Quincy Jones

Quincy Jones chronology
| Quincy Jones Explores the Music of Henry Mancini (1964) | Golden Boy (1964) | I/We Had a Ball (1964) |

Golden Boy is an album by Quincy Jones which was released by Mercury in 1964. The album includes three versions of the theme from the musical Golden Boy with three original compositions and jazz versions of pop hits.

== Reception ==
Professional ratings
Review scores
| Source | Rating |
|---|---|
| Allmusic | 2/5 stars |
| Record Mirror | 3/5 stars |

Allmusic's Scott Yanow wrote: "This Quincy Jones big-band LP finds him exploring a wide variety of material in hopes of finding a hit. ... There are some spots for trumpeters Freddie Hubbard and Joe Newman, altoist Phil Woods, guitarist Jim Hall, and the tough tenor of Eddie "Lockjaw" Davis, but the brevity of the selections (all but 'Django' are between two and four minutes) and the conservative nature of many of the charts keep the music from taking any real chances".

== Track listing ==
1. "Theme from Golden Boy" [String Version] (Charles Strouse, Lee Adams) – 2:47
2. "The Witching Hour" – 3:40
3. "Seaweed" – 2:24
4. "Golden Boy" (Strouse, Adams) – 3:10
5. "Django" (John Lewis) – 4:58
6. "Soul Serenade" (Curtis Ousley, Luther Dixon) – 3:44
7. "Theme From Golden Boy" [Big Band Version] (Strouse, Adams) – 3:54
8. "Hard Day's Night" (John Lennon, Paul McCartney) – 3:24
9. "The Sidewinder" (Lee Morgan) – 3:40
10. "The Midnight Sun Will Never Set" (Jones, Henri Salvador, Dorcas Cochran) – 3:08

== Personnel ==
=== Performance ===
- Quincy Jones – arranger, conductor with orchestra including:
- Freddie Hubbard, Joe Newman, Johnny Frosk, Dick Hurwitz − trumpet
- Al Grey, Billy Byers, Paul Faulise, Quentin Jackson, Bill Watrous − trombone
- James Buffington, Morris Secon − French horn
- Jerome Richardson − flute, soprano saxophone, alto saxophone, tenor saxophone
- Phil Woods − alto saxophone
- Frank Foster − tenor saxophone, flute
- Eddie "Lockjaw" Davis − tenor saxophone
- George Dessinger, Stan Webb − tenor saxophone, clarinet
- Billy Slapin − clarinet, flute
- Cecil Payne − baritone saxophone
- Jim Hall − guitar
- Margaret Ross − harp
- Bobby Scott − piano
- Don Elliott − vibraphone, marimba, vocals
- Art Davis, Bob Cranshaw, Milt Hinton − bass
- Ed Shaughnessy, Grady Tate − drums
- Al Brown, Archie Levin, Charles McCracken, David Mankovitz, David Schwartz, George Ricci, Harold Coletta, Harry Lookofsky, Julien Barber, Karen Tuttle, Kermit Moore, Maurice Bialkin, Selwart Clarke, Ted Israel – string section
