= This Is How I Feel About Jazz =

Studio album by Quincy Jones
- Released: February 1957, CD: 1992
- Recorded: September 14, 19 and 29, 1956; February 25, 1957
- Studio: Beltone Recording Studios, New York City; Los Angeles
- Genre: Jazz
- Length: 36:32
- Label: LP: ABC-Paramount; CD: Impulse!/GRP
- Producer: Creed Taylor; Quincy Jones (CD bonus tracks)

Quincy Jones chronology
Jazz Abroad (1955)	This Is How I Feel About Jazz (1957)	Go West, Man! (1957)

Professional ratings
Review scores
Source	Rating
Allmusic	5/5 stars
Disc	5/5 stars

This Is How I Feel About Jazz is a 1957 album by American musician Quincy Jones, his first full-length album as a bandleader after a recording debut with the 1955 split album Jazz Abroad.

Jones arranged and conducted three recording sessions during September 1956, each with a different line-up, from a nonet to a fifteen-piece big band. Musicians on the album include Charles Mingus, Art Farmer, Phil Woods, Lucky Thompson, Hank Jones, Paul Chambers, Milt Jackson, Art Pepper, Zoot Sims, and Herbie Mann. The bonus tracks on the CD release include compositions by Jimmy Giuffre, Lennie Niehaus and Charlie Mariano.

The album was produced by Creed Taylor and released by ABC-Paramount. The digital reissue on CD in 1992 was repackaged with the label Impulse!, ABCs sub-label for contemporary jazz established by Taylor four years after these sessions took place. The Impulse! version has a cover similar to the original but with the Impulse! logo.

== Track listing ==
1. "Walkin'" (Richard Carpenter) – 10:47
2. "Stockholm Sweetnin' " (Jones) – 5:41
3. "Evening in Paris" (Jones) – 4:09
4. "Sermonette" (Julian Adderley, Jon Hendricks) – 5:58
5. "A Sleepin' Bee" (Harold Arlen, Truman Capote) – 4:42
6. "Boo's Blues" (Jones) – 5:15

Additional tracks on CD release (1992) from Go West, Man!

7. "Dancin' Pants" (Jimmy Giuffre) – 3:47
8. "Be My Guest" (Lennie Niehaus) – 4:26
9. "Kings Road Blues" (Niehaus) – 5:03
10. "Bright Moon" (Giuffre) – 5:17
11. "The Oom Is Blues" (Charlie Mariano) – 5:07
12. "Ballad Medley" – 6:17 "What's New?" (Bob Haggart, Johnny Burke)/"We'll Be Together Again" (Carl T. Fischer, Frankie Laine)/"Time on My Hands" (Harold Adamson, Mack Gordon, Vincent Youmans)/"You Go to My Head" (Haven Gillespie, Fred Coots)/"Laura" (David Raskin)

== Personnel ==
- Quincy Jones - conductor, arranger (1–6)

Tracks 1–2, session from September 29, 1956

- Art Farmer, Bernie Glow, Ernie Royal, Joe Wilder - trumpet
- Jimmy Cleveland, Urbie Green, Frank Rehak - trombone
- Phil Woods - alto saxophone
- Jerome Richardson - flute and tenor saxophone
- Lucky Thompson, Bunny Bardach - tenor saxophone
- Jack Nimitz - baritone sax
- Hank Jones - piano
- Paul Chambers - bass
- Charlie Persip - drums

Tracks 3–4, session from September 14, 1956

- Art Farmer - trumpet
- Jimmy Cleveland - trombone
- Herbie Mann - flute
- Gene Quill - alto saxophone
- Zoot Sims (#3), Lucky Thompson (#4) - tenor saxophone
- Jack Nimitz - baritone sax
- Milt Jackson - vibes
- Hank Jones - piano
- Charles Mingus - bass
- Charlie Persip - drums

Tracks 5–6, session from September 19, 1956

- Art Farmer - trumpet
- Jimmy Cleveland - trombone
- Herbie Mann - flute
- Phil Woods - alto saxophone
- Lucky Thompson - tenor saxophone
- Jack Nimitz - baritone sax
- Billy Taylor - piano
- Charles Mingus - bass
- Charlie Persip - drums

Added tracks 7–12, session from February 25, 1957

- Bill Perkins, Buddy Collette and Walter Benton - tenor saxophone
- Pepper Adams - baritone sax (10–12)
- Carl Perkins - piano
- Leroy Vinnegar - bass
- Shelly Manne - drums
- Arrangements by Jimmy Giuffre (7, 10), Lennie Niehaus (8, 9), Charlie Mariano (11)

=== Production ===
- The original album tracks were recorded by Irv Greenbaum at Beltone Recording Studios, NYC.
- Originally produced by Creed Taylor
- Added tracks from the album Go West, Man! were originally recorded by John Kraus and produced by Quincy Jones.
- Digital remastering by Erick Labson
- Reissue post-production – Adam Zelinka, Joseph Doughney, Michael Landy
- Reissue Producer – Michael Cuscuna
- Executive Producers – Dave Grusin, Larry Rosen
