= Go West, Man! =

Studio album by Quincy Jones
- Released: October 17, 1957
- Recorded: February 25, 1957
- Studio: Los Angeles
- Genre: Jazz
- Length: 42:56
- Label: ABC Paramount
- Producer: Quincy Jones

Quincy Jones chronology
| This Is How I Feel About Jazz (1956) | Go West, Man! (1957) | The Birth of a Band! (1959) |

Professional ratings
Review scores
| Source | Rating |
|---|---|
| Allmusic | 2/5 stars |
| Disc | 5/5 stars |

Go West, Man! is the second studio album by Quincy Jones. It was released in 1957 by ABC Records.

== Track listing ==
1. "Dancin' Pants" (Jimmy Giuffre) – 3:50
2. "Blues Day" (Giuffre) – 4:40
3. "Bright Moon" (Giuffre) – 5:20
4. "No Bones at All" (Johnny Mandel) – 3:58
5. "The Oom Is Blues" (Charlie Mariano) – 5:10
6. "Be My Guest" (Lennie Niehaus) – 4:29
7. Medley: "What's New?" - Bill Perkins solo (Bob Haggart, Johnny Burke) / "We'll Be Together Again" - Pepper Adams solo (Carl Fischer, Frankie Laine) / "Time on My Hands" - Buddy Collette solo (Vincent Youmans); / "You Go to My Head" - Carl Perkins solo (J. Fred Coots, Haven Gillespie); / "Laura" - Walter Benton solo (David Raksin / Johnny Mercer) – 6:17
8. "London Derriere" (Johnny Mandel) – 4:06
9. "Kings Road Blues" (Lennie Niehaus) – 5:06

== Personnel ==
- Quincy Jones – conductor
- Conte Candoli (2, 4, 8) – trumpet
- Pete Candoli (2, 4, 8) – trumpet
- Harry Edison (2, 4, 8) – trumpet
- Jack Sheldon (2, 4, 8) – trumpet
- Benny Carter (1, 6, 9) – alto saxophone
- Herb Geller (1, 6, 9) – alto saxophone
- Charlie Mariano (1, 6, 9) – alto saxophone
- Art Pepper (1, 6, 9) – alto saxophone
- Pepper Adams (3, 5, 7) – baritone saxophone
- Walter Benton (3, 5, 7) – tenor saxophone
- Buddy Collette (3, 5, 7) – tenor saxophone
- Bill Perkins (3, 5, 7) – tenor saxophone
- Lou Levy (1, 6, 9) – piano
- Carl Perkins (2–5, 7–8) – piano
- Red Mitchell (1, 6, 9) – bass
- Leroy Vinnegar (2–5, 7–8) – bass
- Shelly Manne (1, 3, 5–7, 9) – drums
- Mel Lewis (2, 4, 8) – drums
