= Quincy Plays for Pussycats =

Studio album by Quincy Jones
- Released: 1965
- Recorded: March 9 and 10, 1959, February 21, 1961, November 27, 1964, March 3 or 10, 1965 and August 5, 1965
- Studio: Fine Recording and others, New York City
- Genre: Jazz
- Length: 35:13
- Label: Mercury; MG 21050/SR 60050
- Producer: Quincy Jones

Quincy Jones chronology
The Pawnbroker (1965)	Quincy Plays for Pussycats (1965)	Mirage (1965)

Quincy Plays for Pussycats is an album by Quincy Jones featuring sessions recorded between 1959 and 1965 which was released on the Mercury label.

== Reception ==
Professional ratings
Review scores
Source	Rating
Allmusic	3/5 stars
Record Mirror	4/5 stars

Allmusic's Stephen Cook noted, "Quincy Plays for Pussycats is a bright, cheeky big-band album done in a more commercial pop style than previous Quincy Jones albums. Nonetheless, there's plenty to enjoy here ... this is swinging '60s jazz for the martini set".

== Track listing ==
1. "What's New Pussycat?" (Burt Bacharach, Hal David) − 2:44
2. "The Gentle Rain" (Luiz Bonfá, Matt Dubey) − 2:16
3. "Blues in the Night" (Harold Arlen, Johnny Mercer) − 3:58
4. "After Hours" (Avery Parrish) − 3:34
5. "Blues for Trumpet & Koto" (Marvin Hamlisch) − 3:45
6. "(I Can't Get No) Satisfaction" (Mick Jagger, Keith Richards) − 3:27
7. "A Walk in the Black Forest" (Horst Jankowski) − 2:50
8. "Non-Stop to Brazil" (Bonfá) − 2:39
9. "The Hucklebuck" (Andy Gibson, Roy Alfred) − 2:25
10. "Mack the Knife" (Kurt Weill, Bertolt Brecht) − 2:37
11. "Sermonette" (Cannonball Adderley) − 2:49
12. "The In Crowd" (Billy Page) − 3:04
- Recorded at Fine Recorders on March 9 and 10, 1959 (tracks 3, 4 & 9) and February 21, 1961 (track 10) and other New York City studios on June 15, 1962 (track 11), November 27, 1964 (track 5), March 3 or 10, 1965 (tracks 2 & 8) and August 5, 1965 (tracks 1, 6, 7 & 12)

== Personnel ==
=== Performance ===
- Quincy Jones – arranger, conductor with various orchestras including:
- Benny Bailey (track 10), Al DeRisi (track 11), Harry Edison (tracks 3, 4 & 9), Joe Newman (tracks 3, 4, 9 & 11), Jimmy Nottingham (track 1), Ernie Royal (tracks 3, 4 & 9–11), Clark Terry (tracks 3, 4 & 9–11), Snooky Young (track 11) − trumpet
- Billy Byers (tracks 3, 4, 9 & 11), Jimmy Cleveland (tracks 3, 4, 9 & 11), Paul Faulise (track 11), Curtis Fuller (track 10), Urbie Green (tracks 3, 4 & 9), Quentin Jackson (track 11), Kai Winding (track 11), Melba Liston (track 11), Tom Mitchell (tracks 3, 4, 9 & 11), Santo Russo (track 11) − trombone
- Ray Alonge (track 11), Jim Buffington (track 11), Earl Chapin (track 11), Paul Ingraham (track 11), Fred Klein (track 11), Bob Northern (track 11), Willie Ruff (track 11), Julius Watkins (tracks 3, 4 & 9–11) − French horn
- Jay McAllister, Bill Stanley − tuba (track 11)
- Charlie McCoy − harmonica (track 11)
- Roland Kirk (track 11), James Moody (track 11), Jerome Richardson (tracks 3, 4 & 9–11) − flute, alto saxophone, tenor saxophone
- Phil Woods (tracks 3, 4 & 9–11), Walt Levinsky (track 11), Zoot Sims (track 11) − alto saxophone
- Al Cohn (track 11), Budd Johnson (tracks 3, 4, 9 & 11), Sam "The Man" Taylor (tracks 3, 4 & 9) − tenor saxophone
- Eric Dixon (track 10), Romeo Penque (track 11), Seldon Powell (track 11), Frank Wess (track 11) − tenor saxophone, flute
- Sahib Shihab − baritone saxophone, flute (tracks 3, 4, 9 & 10)
- Patti Bown (tracks 3, 4 & 9–11), Lalo Schifrin (track 11), Bobby Scott (track 11) − piano
- Don Arnone (track 10), Kenny Burrell (tracks 3, 4, 9 & 11), Jim Hall (track 11), Sam Herman (track 11), Wayne Wright (track 11) − guitar
- Milt Hinton − bass (tracks 3, 4 & 9)
- Sam Woodyard − drums (tracks 3, 4 & 9)
- Jimmy Crawford (tracks 3, 4, 9 & 10), Stu Martin (track 10) − drums, percussion
- Mike Olatunji, Tito Puente, Carlos "Patato" Valdes − percussion (track 10)
- Other unidentified musicians
