= The Birth of a Band! =

Studio album by Quincy Jones
- Released: 1959
- Recorded: February 9, March 9 & 10, May 26, 17 & 28 and June 16, 1959
- Studio: Fine Recording, New York City
- Genre: Jazz
- Label: Mercury

Quincy Jones chronology
Quincy's Home Again (1958)	The Birth of a Band! (1959)	The Great Wide World of Quincy Jones (1959)

The Birth of a Band! is an album by Quincy Jones that was released by Mercury with performances by Zoot Sims, Clark Terry, Harry Edison, and Phil Woods.

== Reception ==
Professional ratings
Review scores
Source	Rating
Allmusic	5/5 stars

The Allmusic review by Scott Yanow called it "one of his finest jazz recordings".

== Track listing ==
1. "The Birth of a Band" (Quincy Jones) – 2:53
2. "Moanin'" (Bobby Timmons) – 3:02
3. "I Remember Clifford" (Benny Golson) – 3:42
4. "Along Came Betty" (Golson) – 3:21
5. "Tickle Toe" (Lester Young) – 2:55
6. "Happy Faces" (Sonny Stitt) – 2:40
7. "Whisper Not" (Golson) – 3:22
8. "The Gypsy" (Billy Reid) – 4:05
9. "A Change of Pace" (Harry Arnold, Quincy Jones) – 3:20
10. "Tuxedo Junction" (Erskine Hawkins, Bill Johnson, Julian Dash, Buddy Feyne) – 2:44

== Personnel ==
- Quincy Jones – conductor, arranger: Tracks 1, 2, 4, 6, 7, 9, 10
- Nat Pierce – arranger Track 3
- Al Cohn – arranger Track 5
- Melba Liston – arranger Track 8
- Harry Edison – trumpet
- Joe Newman – trumpet
- Ernie Royal – trumpet
- Clark Terry – trumpet
- Joe Wilder – trumpet
- Billy Byers – trombone
- Jimmy Cleveland – trombone
- Urbie Green – trombone
- Melba Liston – trombone
- Tom Mitchell – trombone
- Julius Watkins – French horn
- Jerome Richardson – flute, alto saxophone, tenor saxophone, piccolo
- Frank Wess – alto saxophone, flute
- Phil Woods – alto saxophone
- Benny Golson – tenor saxophone
- Budd Johnson – tenor saxophone
- Zoot Sims – tenor saxophone
- Sam Taylor – tenor saxophone
- Danny Bank – baritone saxophone
- Sahib Shihab – baritone saxophone
- Patti Bown – piano
- Moe Wechsler – piano
- Kenny Burrell– guitar
- Les Spann – guitar
- Milt Hinton – bass
- Jimmy Crawford – drums
- Osie Johnson – drums
- Don Lamond – drums
- Sam Woodyard – drums
