= I/We Had a Ball =

1965 compilation album

Compilation album by Art Blakey, Milt Jackson, Oscar Peterson, Dizzy Gillespie, Quincy Jones, Chet Baker
- Released: 1965
- Recorded: November 6, 20 & 25, 1964; December 9 & 20, 1964; May 18, 1965
- Studio: Chicago, Los Angeles, New York City
- Genre: Jazz
- Label: Limelight
- Producer: Jack Tracy

Quincy Jones chronology
| Golden Boy (1964) | I/We Had a Ball (1965) | The Pawnbroker (1965) |

Milt Jackson chronology
| Jazz 'n' Samba (1964) | I/We Had a Ball (1965) | In a New Setting (1965) |

Oscar Peterson chronology
| Canadiana Suite (1965) | I/We Had a Ball (1965) | Eloquence (1965) |

I/We Had a Ball is a compilation album consisting of jazz versions of songs from Jack Lawrence and Stan Freeman's musical I Had a Ball performed by Art Blakey, Milt Jackson, Oscar Peterson, Dizzy Gillespie, Quincy Jones and Chet Baker which was released by Limelight in 1965.

== Track listing ==
All compositions by Jack Lawrence and Stan Freeman

1. "I Had a Ball" − 5:00
2. "Fickle Finger of Fate" − 2:14
3. "Almost" − 4:18
4. "Faith" − 5:52
5. "Addie's at it Again" − 4:57
6. "Coney Island, U.S.A." − 2:25
7. "The Other Half of Me" − 3:05
8. "Think Beautiful" − 4:18

== Personnel ==
=== Performance ===
Tracks 1, 3 & 5: recorded in New York City on December 20, 1964

- Quincy Jones – arranger, conductor
- Nat Adderley, Dizzy Gillespie, Freddie Hubbard, James Nottingham, Joe Newman − trumpet
- Curtis Fuller, Melba Liston − trombone
- James Moody, Jerry Dodgion, Phil Woods − alto saxophone
- Roland Kirk − tenor saxophone, manzello
- Benny Golson, Lucky Thompson − tenor saxophone
- Pepper Adams − baritone saxophone
- Milt Jackson − vibraphone
- Bob Cranshaw − double bass
- Art Blakey − drums

Track 2: recorded at Universal Recording Studios, Chicago, IL on November 6, 1964

- Dizzy Gillespie − trumpet, vocals
- James Moody − tenor saxophone, flute
- Kenny Barron − piano
- Chris White − bass
- Rudy Collins − drums

Track 4: extracted from 'S Make It recorded at Radio Recorders, Hollywood, CA on November 15, 16 and 25, 1964

- Art Blakey − drums
- Lee Morgan − trumpet
- Curtis Fuller − trombone
- John Gilmore − tenor saxophone
- John Hicks − piano
- Victor Sproles − bass

Track 6: recorded in New York City on May 18, 1965

- Oscar Peterson − piano
- Ray Brown − bass
- Ed Thigpen − drums

Track 7: recorded in New York City on December 9, 1964

- Milt Jackson − vibraphone
- McCoy Tyner − piano
- Bob Cranshaw − bass
- Connie Kay − drums

Track 8: recorded at A&R Studios, New York City on November 20, 1964

- Chet Baker − flugelhorn, vocals
- Bob James − piano
- Michael Fleming − bass
- Charlie Rice − drums
