= Walk, Don't Run (soundtrack) =

Soundtrack album by Quincy Jones
- Released: 1966
- Recorded: 1966
- Genre: Jazz, soundtrack
- Length: 34:54
- Label: Mainstream

Quincy Jones chronology
Quincy's Got a Brand New Bag (1966)	Walk, Don't Run (1966)	The Deadly Affair (1966)

Professional ratings
Review scores
Source	Rating
Allmusic	5/5 stars

Walk, Don't Run is the soundtrack to the 1966 film of the same name composed by Quincy Jones. It was orchestrated by Jack Hayes and Leo Shuken. Allmusic's Stephen Cook describes the score as having a "Henry Mancini inspired sound", with "excellent contributions from Toots Thielemans and Harry "Sweets" Edison". Jones collaborated with Peggy Lee on the songs "Happy Feet" and "Stay with Me". Jones was recommended to score the film for Cary Grant, who had met him through Lee.

== Track listing ==
1. "Happy Feet" – 2:13
2. "Stay with Me" – 2:57
3. "Copy Cat (Wack a Do)" – 2:59
4. "Happy Feet - vocal" – 1:47
5. "Papa San" – 1:50
6. "Abso-Bleedin'-Lutely" – 2:50
7. "Stay with Me - vocal" – 2:22
8. "One More Time" – 2:49
9. "20th Century Drawers" – 3:10
10. "Locked Out" – 2:15
11. "Happy Feet - reprise" – 1:43
12. "Rabelaisian Rutland" – 1:49
13. "One More Time - reprise" – 0:46

== Personnel ==
=== Performance ===
- Quincy Jones – composer, conductor
- Toots Thielemans – harmonica, whistles
- Harry "Sweets" Edison – trumpet
- Bud Shank – reeds
- Earl Palmer – drums
- Carol Kaye – electric bass
- Emil Richards – percussion
- Don Elliot Voices – vocals on "Happy Feet"
- Tony Clementi – vocals on "Stay with Me"
- Jack Hayes, Leo Shuken – orchestrations
- Richard Hazard – vocal orchestrations
