= Porter Kilbert =

Jazz saxophonist (1921–1960)

Porter Kilbert (June 10, 1921 – October 23, 1960) was a jazz alto and tenor saxophonist.

In September 1942, he replaced Preston Love as lead alto saxophonist in Nat Towles' band, before going on to spend two years with Benny Carter's band, playing in line-ups including Willard Brown, Curly Russell, Max Roach, Oscar Bradley, Ulysses Livingston, Sonny White, Teddy Brannon, Bumps Myers, Gene Porter, Alton Moore, J.J. Johnson, Shorty Haughton, Claude Dunson, Snooky Young, Freddie Webster, Gerald Wilson, and Jake Porter.

After a brief spell with Roy Eldridge's band, he joined Red Saunders' band in New York in September 1946. The band later took up residency at Chicago's Club DeLisa, and Kilbert would remain with the Saunders band until January 1952, when he left to form his own band.

In December 1946, he was in a line-up led by Coleman Hawkins, recording for Prestige, with Fats Navarro, Milt Jackson, JJ Johnson, Hank Jones, Curley Russell and Max Roach.

In 1947, he led an orchestra backing Clarence Samuels recording for Aristocrat.

In 1954, he was a member of the Horace Henderson big band and in 1955 and 1956, he participated in a series of "battles of the saxes" with Tom Archia at the C&C Lounge.

In 1960, having recorded the previous year for bandleader Quincy Jones, featuring as soloist on some of the tracks, he toured Europe with Jones' big band (with fellow altoist Phil Woods).

== Discography ==
As leader/co-leader

- 1957: "Swinging with a Mombo"/"Lee's Bounce" – with Porter Kilbert and Orchestra (Porter Kilbert; Fip Ricard; Hobart Dotson; Lewis "Bill" Ogletree (tp); Johnny Avant (tb); Eddie Williams; McKinley "Mac" Easton (bars); Billy Wallace (p); Eddie Calhoun; Vernel Fournier (Ping Records)

As sideman

- 1957: The Colorful Strings of Jimmy Woode – Jimmy Woode
- 1959: The Great Wide World of Quincy Jones – Quincy Jones (Mercury)
- 1959: Something to Swing About - Carmen McRae (Kapp)
- 1960: I Dig Dancers - Quincy Jones (Mercury)
