= The Great Wide World of Quincy Jones =

Studio album by Quincy Jones
- Released: 1959
- Recorded: November 4 & 9, 1959
- Studio: Fine Recording, New York City
- Genre: Jazz
- Label: Mercury

Quincy Jones chronology
| The Birth of a Band! (1959) | The Great Wide World of Quincy Jones (1959) | I Dig Dancers (1960) |

The Great Wide World of Quincy Jones is an album by Quincy Jones that was released by Mercury.

== Reception ==
Professional ratings
Review scores
| Source | Rating |
|---|---|
| AllMusic | 4/5 stars |
| DownBeat | 5/5 stars |

The AllMusic review by Scott Yanow called it "a top-notch bop-oriented big band".

== Track listing ==
1. "Lester Leaps In" (Lester Young) – 3:33
2. "Ghana" (Ernie Wilkins) – 4:36
3. "Caravan" (Juan Tizol, Duke Ellington, Irving Mills) – 3:28
4. "Everybody's Blues" (Wilkins) – 4:13
5. "Cherokee (Indian Love Song)" (Ray Noble) – 3:05
6. "Air Mail Special" (Benny Goodman, Charlie Christian, Jimmy Mundy) – 2:33
7. "They Say It's Wonderful" (Irving Berlin) – 3:21
8. "Chant of the Weed" (Don Redman) – 3:14
9. "I Never Has Seen Snow" (Harold Arlen, Truman Capote) – 3:08
10. "Eesom" (Bill Potts) – 5:04

== Personnel ==
- Quincy Jones – conductor
- Art Farmer, Lennie Johnson, Jimmy Maxwell, Lee Morgan, Ernie Royal, Nick Travis – trumpet
- Billy Byers, Jimmy Cleveland, Urbie Green, Frank Rehak – trombone
- Julius Watkins – French horn
- Porter Kilbert, Phil Woods – alto saxophone
- Budd Johnson – tenor saxophone
- Jerome Richardson – tenor saxophone, flute, piccolo
- Sahib Shihab – baritone saxophone
- Patti Bown – piano
- Les Spann – guitar, flute
- Buddie Jones, Buddy Catlett – bass
- Don Lamond – drums
- Ralph Burns (track 8), Al Cohn (tracks 6 & 7), Bill Potts (tracks 3, 9 & 10), Ernie Wilkins (tracks 1, 2, 4 & 5) – arranger
