= Billy Byers =

American jazz trombonist & arranger (1927–1996)

- Born: William Mitchell Byers; May 1, 1927; Los Angeles, California, U.S.
- Died: May 1, 1996 (aged 69) Malibu, California, U.S.
- Genre: Jazz
- Instruments: Trombone

William Mitchell Byers (May 1, 1927 – May 1, 1996) was an American jazz trombonist and arranger.

== Early life ==
Byers was born in Los Angeles on May 1, 1927. He suffered from arthritis from a young age and was unable to continue his plans of a career as a pianist.

== Career ==
Byers picked up trombone and played with Karl Kiffe before serving in the United States Army in 1944 and 1945. In the second half of the 1940s he arranged and played trombone for Georgie Auld, Buddy Rich, Benny Goodman, Charlie Ventura, and Teddy Powell. Following this he composed for WMGM (AM) radio and television in New York City. In the middle of the 1950s he was in Paris arranging; he also led a session of his own, released as Jazz on the Left Bank, at this time. Later in the 1950s in Europe he played with Harold Arlen (1959–1960) and with the orchestra of Quincy Jones. He became Jones's assistant at Mercury Records in the 1960s, and arranged for Count Basie albums. He also recorded some Duke Ellington standards on his own. He toured Europe and Japan alongside Frank Sinatra in 1974. Byers had extensive credits arranging and conducting for film, and won the Drama Desk Award for Outstanding Orchestrations for City of Angels.

== Personal life ==
Byers died in Malibu, California, on May 1, 1996. Material from his career is held by the Library of Congress in Washington, D.C.

== Discography ==
=== As leader/co-leader ===
- The Jazz Workshop (RCA Victor, 1955)
- New Sounds in Swing (Jazztone, 1956) with Joe Newman - also released as Byers' Guide
- Jazz on the Left Bank (Epic, 1956) with Martial Solal
- Impressions of Duke Ellington (Mercury, 1961)

=== As sideman ===
With Count Basie

- More Hits of the 50's and 60's (Verve, 1963) - as arranger and conductor
- Pop Goes the Basie (Reprise, 1965) - as arranger and conductor
- Basie Swingin' Voices Singin' (ABC-Paramount, 1966) with the Alan Copeland Singers

With Bob Brookmeyer

- Gloomy Sunday and Other Bright Moments (Verve, 1961)

With Al Cohn

- Mr. Music (RCA Victor, 1955)

With Billy Eckstine

- The Golden Hits of Billy Eckstine (Mercury, 1963) - as arranger

With Coleman Hawkins

- The Hawk in Hi Fi (RCA Victor, 1956) - as arranger and conductor

With Al Jarreau

- Breakin' Away (Warner Bros., 1981) - as arranger

With J. J. Johnson

- Goodies (RCA Victor, 1965) as arranger/conductor

With Quincy Jones

- The Birth of a Band! (Mercury, 1959)
- Quincy Jones Explores the Music of Henry Mancini (Mercury, 1964)
- Golden Boy (Mercury, 1964)
- Quincy Plays for Pussycats (Mercury, 1959-65 [1965])
- The Great Wide World of Quincy Jones (Mercury, 1959)

With Lee Konitz

- You and Lee (Verve, 1959)

With Jack McDuff

- Prelude (Prestige, 1963)

With Gary McFarland

- The Jazz Version of "How to Succeed in Business without Really Trying" (Verve, 1962)

With Hal McKusick

- Triple Exposure (Prestige, 1957)

With Carmen McRae

- Something to Swing About (Kapp, 1959)

With Joe Newman

- I Feel Like a Newman (Storyville, 1956)

With Lalo Schifrin

- Music from Mission: Impossible (Dot, 1967)

With Bud Shank

- Windmills of Your Mind (Pacific Jazz, 1969)

With Charlie Shavers

- Excitement Unlimited (Capitol, 1963)

With Julius Watkins

- French Horns for My Lady (Philips, 1962) - as arranger

With Andy Williams

- Under Paris Skies (Cadence Records, 1960)

With Cootie Williams

- Cootie Williams in Hi-Fi (RCA Victor, 1958)

With Kai Winding

- Kai Olé (Verve, 1961)

With Frank Zappa

- The Grand Wazoo (1972)
- Waka/Jawaka (1972)
