= Harry Arnold (musician) =

Swedish jazz musician (1920–1971)

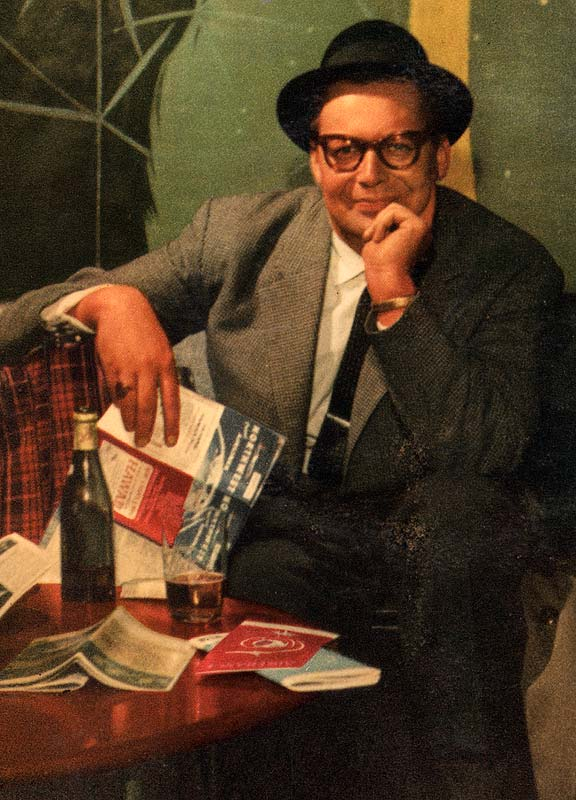
- Harry Arnold, 1958.

Background information
- Born: 7 August 1920; Helsingborg, Sweden
- Died: 11 February 1971 (aged 50) Stockholm, Sweden
- Genres: jazz
- Occupations: composer, musician
- Instrument: saxophone

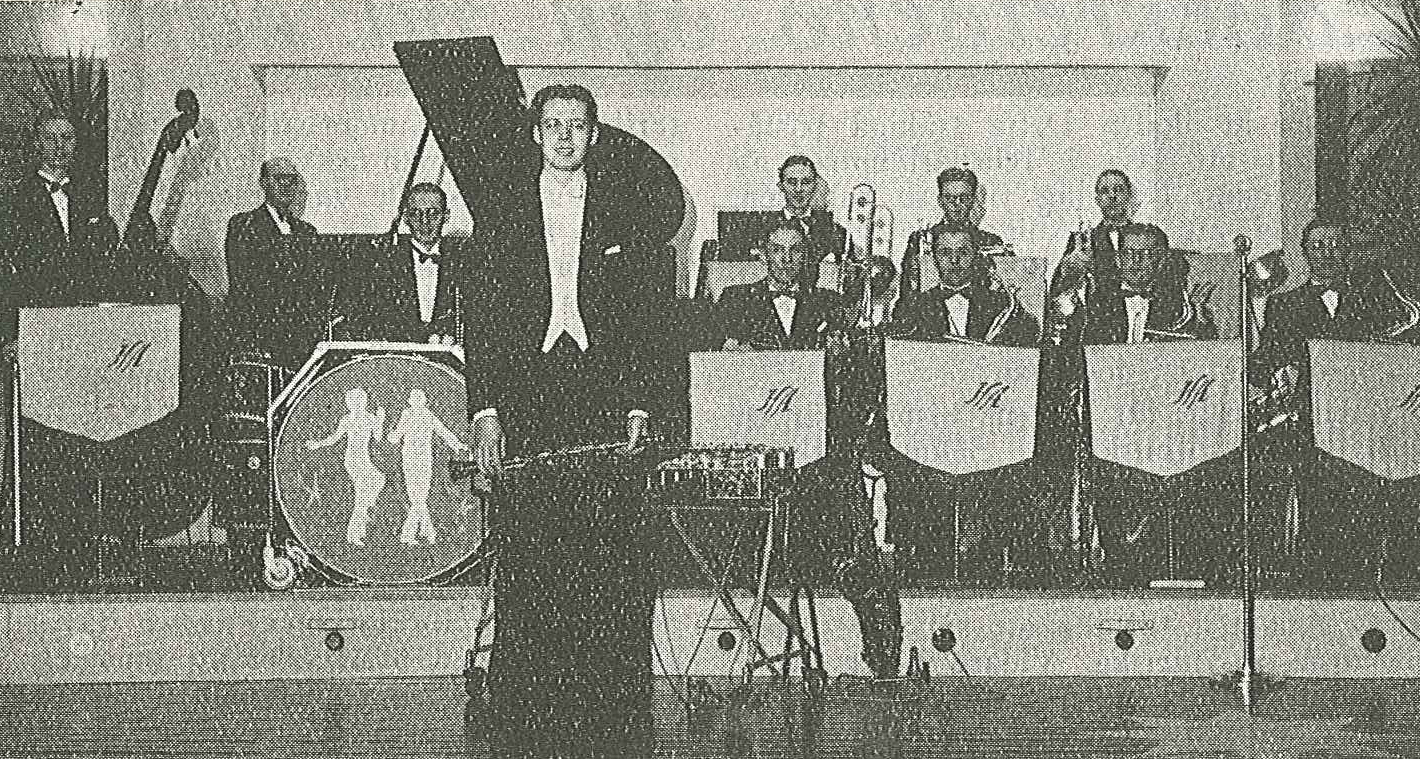
Harry Arnold with his orchestra in 1943

Harry Arnold Persson (7 August 1920 – 11 February 1971) was a Swedish jazz saxophonist and bandleader. Arnold was born in Helsingborg, and led his first big band in 1942, playing the saxophone initially but eventually ceasing to perform to concentrate on arranging. From 1949–1952, he played and arranged for Thore Ehrling's band and worked extensively as a studio musician, particularly writing film scores through much of the 1950s. From 1956 to 1965, Arnold led the Swedish Radio Big Band, which included Arne Domnérus, Bengt Hallberg, and Åke Persson. American trumpeter Benny Bailey played with the band for a time, and Quincy Jones arranged and briefly led the group; they recorded with Ernestine Anderson, Lucky Thompson, Coleman Hawkins, Toots Thielemans, Tony Scott, and Stan Getz. The group disbanded in 1965, after which Arnold continued work as an arranger and led big bands in Europe. He died in Stockholm in February 1971 at the age of 50.

== Discography ==
- Harry Arnold+Big Band+Quincy Jones=Jazz! (Mercury, 1958)
- I Love Harry Arnold & All His Jazz (Atco, 1960)
- Guest Book (Jazzland, 1962)
- The Big Band in Concert 1957/1958 (Dragon, 1996)
- Studio Sessions 56–58 (Dragon, 1998)
- Big Band 64/65 Vol. 1 (Dragon, 2003)
- Big Band 64/65 Vol. 2 (Dragon, 2003)
