= Simon Brehm =

Swedish musical artist

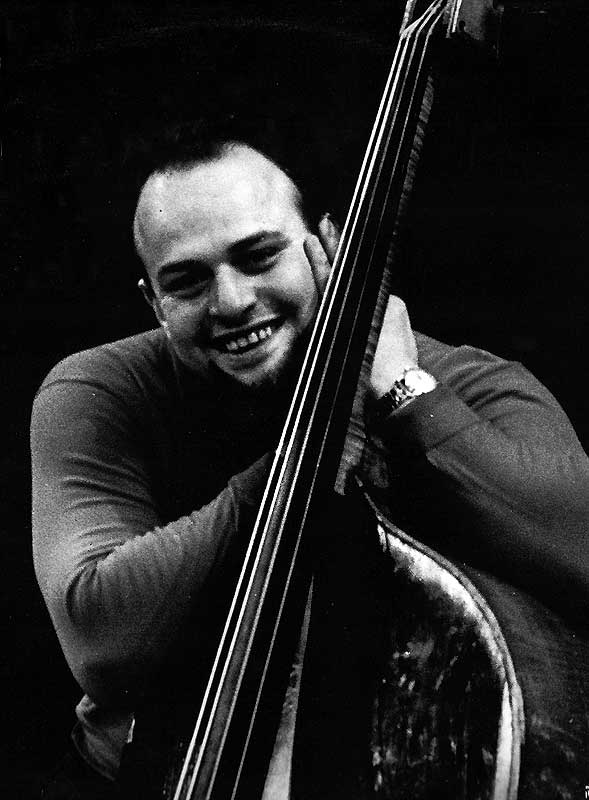

Background information
- Born: 31 December 1921; Sweden
- Died: 11 February 1967 (aged 45) Sweden
- Genre: Bebop
- Occupations: Musician; Bandleader; Record producer Manager
- Instrument: Double-bass
- Label: Karusell
- Formerly of: Rolf Billberg, Stan Getz

Simon Brehm (31 December 1921 – 11 February 1967) was a Swedish double-bass player and, later in life, a record producer and owner of Karusell Records. He was the manager of the singer Lill-Babs and was the leader of the orchestra that played in the TV show Hylands hörna from 1962.

== Discography ==
With Quincy Jones

- Jazz Abroad (Emarcy, 1955)
- Quincy's Home Again (Metronome, 1958) - also released as Harry Arnold + Big Band + Quincy Jones = Jazz! (EmArcy)

Albums

- Lennart Strand Löper På Tangenterna (1953)
- Charlie Filmkarusell (1961)

Singles & EPs

- Who's Sorry Now / After You've Gone (1947)
- My Melancholy Baby / On The Sunny Side Of The Street (1947)
- Little Man, You've Had A Busy Day / Ol' Man River (1952)
- Rock And Roll-Valsen / Mackie Kniven (1956)
- Onkel Charlie Från Minnesota / Den Trogne Husaren (1956)
- Karusell-nyheter 2 (1956)
- En Äkta Rock'n Roll (1957)
- Mamma, En Karl Har Sett På Mig/Kul I Plugget (1957)
- Min Bas Och Jag / Matilda, Matilda (1957)
- Karusell-nyheter 4 (1957)
- Onkel Charlie... (1957)
- Melodie D'amour (1958)
- Sail Along Silv'ry Moon (1958)
- En Brud Utan Karl / Tuffe Sven (1959)
- Charlie Brown / Hur Kära Som Helst (1959)
- Dom Får Foten I Stället På Fjället (1959)
- Oj Oj Oj - Med En Bleckplåtsmoj (1959)
- Tuffe Sven... (1959)
- Tag Hit Paketen Far (1959)
- Det Svänger På Slottet (1959)
- Bjällerklang / Födelsedagsvisan (1960)
- Karusellvisan (1960)
- Här Får Du Cous-Cous Min Skatt! (1960)
- Platt-lir (1960)
- Ångbåten (1960)
- Cous Cous (1960)
- Simons Julhörna 1962 (1962)
- Farväl Du Gröda, Gradda, Sköda, Sadda Sobbar (1963)
- Dunder Och Snus Och... (1964)
- Risgrynsgröt Och Russin / Albin (1966)
- Det Var Då Det / Jag Skakar På Mitt Kokosträd (unknown)
