= Bobby Scott (musician) =

American jazz musician and songwriter (1937–1990)

- Born: Robert William Scott; January 24, 1937; Bronx, New York, U.S.
- Died: November 5, 1990 (aged 53) New York City, New York, U.S.
- Genre: Jazz
- Occupations: Musician; arranger; record producer; songwriter
- Instruments: Piano; vibraphone
- Labels: ABC; Verve; Atlantic; Mercury

Robert William Scott (January 24, 1937 – November 5, 1990) was an American musician, arranger, record producer, and songwriter.

== Biography ==
Born and raised in the Bronx, Scott became a pianist, vibraphonist, and singer, and could also play the accordion, cello, clarinet, and double bass. He studied under Edvard Moritz at the La Follette School of Music at the age of eight, and was working professionally at 11. In 1952, he began touring with Louis Prima, and also toured and performed with Gene Krupa and Tony Scott in the 1950s. On the 1956 Jazz at the Philharmonic tour, where he was the pianist in Gene Krupa's trio, he and Lester Young formed a friendship, documented in an essay for Gene Lees' monthly "JazzLetter," reproduced in Lewis Porter's A Lester Young Reader. In 1956 he hit the U.S. Billboard Hot 100 with the song "Chain Gang", peaking at number 13. It sold over one million copies, and was awarded a gold disc.

Scott led a jazz quartet—with Frank Socolow, Red Kelly, and Kenny Hume—that played at the side of the stage during the Broadway performances of A Taste of Honey, at the Lyceum Theatre, October 3, 1960, through September 9 1961.

== Career and Grammy Award ==
As a bandleader, he did sessions for Verve, ABC-Paramount, Bethlehem, and Musicmasters. As a songwriter, he won a Grammy Award for Best Instrumental Composition for the song "A Taste of Honey". In addition to "A Taste of Honey", Scott also co-wrote the song "He Ain't Heavy, He's My Brother". In the 1960s he became a music teacher and studied again under Moritz, but occasionally recorded as well, including a Nat King Cole tribute album released in the 1980s. He also composed film soundtracks, including the scores to Slaves (1969), Joe (1970), and Who Says I Can't Ride a Rainbow! (1971). During the 1980s he composed music for classical guitar, harp, and piano. His arrangements for jazz vocalist Jackie Paris's 1962 The Song Is Paris stand up well 60 years later; the album was considered a career high for Paris. Scott worked extensively with Quincy Jones, frequently as pianist on his 1960s LPs. He also arranged for Bobby Darin, Les and Larry Elgart, Chuck Jackson, Jones, and Paris in the 1960s. In 1961, Scott's arrangements of his suite "The City" was recorded by Larry Elgart's Orchestra, with Elgart as the principal soloist.

== Death ==
Scott died of lung cancer in New York City, at the age of 53.

== Discography ==
=== As leader ===
- The Compositions of Bobby Scott (Bethlehem, 1955)
- Scott Free (ABC-Paramount, 1955)
- Bobby Scott and 2 Horns (ABC-Paramount, 1956)
- Serenata (Verve, 1957)
- Bobby Scott Plays the Music of Leonard Bernstein (Verve, 1959)
- The Compleat Musician (Atlantic, 1960)
- A Taste of Honey (Atlantic, 1960)
- Joyful Noises (Mercury, 1962)
- When the Feeling Hits You! (Mercury, 1963)
- 108 Pounds of Heartache (Mercury, 1963)
- I Had a Ball (Mercury, 1964)
- My Heart in My Hands (Columbia, 1967)
- Star (Columbia, 1969)
- Robert William Scott (Warner Bros., 1970)
- From Eden to Canaan (Columbia, 1976)
- Forecast: Rain with Sunny Skies (Columbia, 1978)
- For Sentimental Reasons (MusicMasters, 1990)
- Slowly (MusicMasters, 1991)
- Bobby Scott Sings the Best of Lerner and Loewe (LPTime, 2010)

=== As sideman ===
- Chet Baker, Baby Breeze (Limelight, 1965)
- Bobby Darin, Winners (Atco, 1960 rec. [1964 rel.])
- Double Six of Paris, The Double Six of Paris Sing Ray Charles (Philips, 1964)
- Buddy Emmons, Steel Guitar Jazz (Mercury, 1964)
- Quincy Jones, Golden Boy (Mercury, 1964)
- Quincy Jones, Quincy Plays for Pussycats (Mercury, 1965)
- Quincy Jones, In the Heat of the Night OST (United Artists, 1967)
- Wes Montgomery, Movin' Wes (Verve, 1964)
