= Riverwalk Jazz =

Defunct US radio program

- Genre: Jazz
- Country of origin: United States
- Language: English
- Syndicates: Public Radio International
- Hosted by: Jim Cullum, Jr. and David Holt
- Recording studio: Jim Cullum's Landing Jazz Club, San Antonio, Texas
- Original release: 1989 – 2012
- Website: Official website

Riverwalk Jazz was a popular weekly public radio series distributed by Public Radio International that ran from 1989 to 2012.

== History ==
The series began broadcasting in 1989 and was produced by PVPMedia. The principal performing band on Riverwalk Jazz is the Jim Cullum Jazz Band. The series co-hosts are bandleader Jim Cullum, Jr. and folklorist and storyteller David Holt. Jim Cullum's Landing Jazz Club on the Paseo Del Rio (San Antonio River Walk) in San Antonio, Texas serves as the venue where most of the hour-long shows are produced.

In 2012, the Riverwalk Jazz Collection was donated to the Stanford Archive of Recorded Sound by PVPMedia. Two continuous streams of almost every Riverwalk show can be accessed from Stanford's Riverwalk Jazz site.

== Program ==
=== Jazz era ===
Through the use of live music performance, narration, autobiographies, historical recordings and musical demonstrations, the series focuses on jazz from before World War II as played by the great pioneers such as Jelly Roll Morton, Joe "King" Oliver, Louis Armstrong, Bix Beiderbecke, Sidney Bechet, Duke Ellington, Fletcher Henderson and many more. Also featured are the lives and music of the great interwar pop composers such as George and Ira Gershwin, Rodgers and Hart, Harry Warren, Harold Arlen, Irving Berlin, Jerome Kern and many others.

=== Guests ===
Frequent guests include playwright and actor Vernel Bagneris, pianist Dick Hyman, vocalists Topsy Chapman and Nina Ferro, and cornetist Bob Barnard, as well as guest bands such as the Hot Club of San Francisco. Other notable musical guests in past years have included Benny Carter, Linda Hopkins, Bob Wilber, Bob Haggart, Yank Lawson, Kenny Davern, Harry "Sweets" Edison, Clark Terry, Bucky Pizzarelli, John Pizzarelli, Banu Gibson, Rebecca Kilgore, Ralph Sutton, Ken Peplowski, Doc Cheatham, Savion Glover, Milt Hinton, Jay McShann, Joe Williams, Shelly Berg, Catherine Russell, Bob Havens, Carol Woods, Harry Allen, Howard Alden. Marty Grosz, Lionel Hampton, Vince Giordano, Warren Vaché, Jr., and William Warfield.

=== Broadcasts ===
In addition to PRI affiliates on FM/AM radio, Riverwalk Jazz airs weekly on Sirius XM Radio's Real Jazz channel (XM 70/Sirius 72).

=== Personnel ===
The personnel of the Jim Cullum Jazz Band included Jim Cullum, Jr., leader and cornet; Ron Hockett, clarinet and saxophone; Kenny Rupp, trombone; Jim Turner, piano; Howard Elkins, banjo and guitar; Steve Pikal, bass; Hal Smith, drums. Past personnel heard in encore performances on the radio series include John Sheridan, piano; Allan Vaché, clarinet; Mike Pittsley, trombone; Brian Ogilvie (de), clarinet and saxophone; Evan Christopher, clarinet; Don Mopsick, bass; Mike Waskiewicz, drums; Ed Torres, drums; Kevin Dorn, drums and Benji Bohannon, drums.
