= Howard Alden =

American jazz guitarist (born 1958)

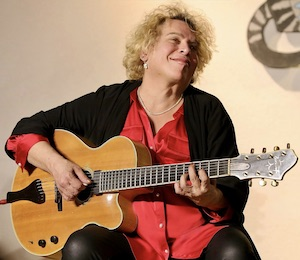
- Alden performing in 2024

Background information
- Born: Howard Vincent Alden; October 17, 1958 (age 67); Newport Beach, California, U.S.
- Genres: Jazz; swing
- Occupation: Musician
- Instruments: Seven-string guitar; tenor banjo; tenor guitar
- Years active: 1973–present
- Labels: Concord; Nagel-Heyer; Arbors
- Website: howardalden.com

Howard Vincent Alden (born October 17, 1958) is an American jazz guitarist born in Newport Beach, California. Alden has recorded many albums for Concord Records, including four with seven-string guitar innovator George Van Eps.

== Early life ==
Howard Vincent Alden was born in Newport Beach, California, on October 17, 1958. He grew up in Huntington Beach, playing piano, harmonica, the four-string tenor guitar, and then four-string banjo at age ten. After hearing recordings of Barney Kessel, Charlie Christian, Django Reinhardt, and other jazz guitar greats, he got a six-string guitar and started teaching himself to play. As a teenager he played both instruments at venues in the Los Angeles area. He studied guitar with Jimmy Wyble when he was 16. In 1977–78 he studied jazz guitar at the Guitar Institute of Technology (GIT) in Hollywood with Herb Ellis, Joe Pass, and Howard Roberts. At GIT he assisted Roberts in organizing and preparing curriculum materials. Alden then conducted some of his own classes at GIT.

== Musical career ==
Alden made his first trip to the east coast in the summer of 1979, playing in a trio led by vibraphonist Red Norvo for three months at Resorts International in Atlantic City.

He moved to New York City in 1982 to play an extended engagement at the Café Carlyle with jazz pianist/songwriter Joe Bushkin. Soon afterwards, he was discovered by Joe Williams and Woody Herman. In 1983 he was already collaborating with Dick Hyman, when he appeared with him and a host of other musicians at Eubie Blake's one-hundredth birthday concert.

Alden formed the Alden-Barrett Quintet in 1985 with Dan Barrett, which played in the swing idiom, as he has done for most of his career. He also began partnerships with Ruby Braff, Kenny Davern and Jack Lesberg. He joined George Van Eps, innovator of the seven-string guitar, on tour and recorded albums with him, switching to the seven-string himself in 1992.

While in New York doing jazz guitar work, Alden sought out local trad jazz musicians to play tenor banjo with. He used banjo working with Dick Hyman, including a 1989 album of Harry Reser music. He also played in the New York Banjo Ensemble with Eddy Davis and Cynthia Sayer, and after moving to Arizona he performed and recorded with The Great Banjo Summit.

== Sweet and Lowdown ==
Alden recorded the guitar performances for Sean Penn's character Emmet Ray in Woody Allen's 1999 film Sweet and Lowdown, and taught Penn how to mime the performances for the film. The score also featured Bucky Pizzarelli on rhythm guitar and arrangements by pianist Dick Hyman.

In 2015 Howard married dancer/costume designer Diane Garcia, and has since made the southwest his home and base for their musical travels and adventures.

== Awards ==
- Best Emerging Guitar Talent, JazzTimes (1990)
- Talent Deserving Wider Recognition, Down Beat (1992, 1993, 1995, 1996)
- Guitar Player of the Year, American Guitar Museum (2003)
- Top 75 Guitarists, Down Beat (2008)

== Discography ==
=== As leader ===
- Early Indications (self-released, 1972)
- Swing Street with Dan Barrett (Concord Jazz, 1988)
- Swinging into Prominence with Norris Turney, Jake Hanna (Famous Door, 1988)
- No Amps Allowed with Jack Lesberg (Chiaroscuro, 1988)
- The Howard Alden Trio Plus Special Guests Ken Peplowski & Warren Vache (Concord Jazz, 1989)
- The ABQ Salutes Buck Clayton with Dan Barrett (Concord Jazz, 1989)
- Plays the Music of Harry Reser with Dick Hyman (Stomp Off, 1989)
- Snowy Morning Blues (Concord Jazz, 1990)
- 13 Strings with George Van Eps (Concord Jazz, 1991)
- Misterioso (Concord Jazz, 1991)
- Hand-Crafted Swing with George Van Eps (Concord Jazz, 1992)
- Ken Peplowski and Howard Alden (Concord Jazz, 1993)
- Seven and Seven with George Van Eps (Concord Jazz, 1993)
- A Good Likeness (Concord Jazz, 1993)
- Your Story: The Music of Bill Evans with Frank Wess (Concord Jazz, 1994)
- Encore with Ken Peplowski (Concord Jazz, 1995)
- Concord Jazz Guitar Collective with Frank Vignola, Jimmy Bruno (Concord Jazz, 1995)
- Keepin' Time with George Van Eps (Concord Jazz, 1996)
- Take Your Pick (Concord Jazz, 1997)
- Full Circle with Jimmy Bruno, Joe Pass, Ray Brown (Concord 1998)
- Love with Terrie Richards Alden (Nagel-Heyer, 2001)
- My Shining Hour (Concord Jazz, 2002)
- Soulmates with Butch Miles (Nagel-Heyer, 2002)
- In a Mellow Tone with Bucky Pizzarelli (Concord Jazz, 2003)
- Live in '95 with Dan Barrett (Arbors, 2004)
- Live at Lewes with Geoff Simkins, Simon Woolf, Steve Brown (Woolfnotes, 2006)
- Pow-Wow with Ken Peplowski (Arbors, 2008)
- I Remember Django (Arbors, 2010)
- A Splendid Trio with Scott Hamilton, Frank Tate (Arbors, 2011)
- Solo Guitar (K2B2, 2014)
- The Happenings: Music of Herbie Nichols with Marty Krystall, Buell Neidlinger (K2B2, 2017)
- The Great Banjo Summit and Other Things with Strings (New Vintage Music, 2018)

=== As sideman or guest ===
With Ruby Braff

- Me, Myself and I (Concord Jazz, 1989)
- Bravura Eloquence (Concord Jazz, 1990)
- Volume One (Concord Jazz, 1991)
- Volume Two (Concord Jazz, 1992)
- Cornet Chop Suey (Concord Jazz, 1994)
- As Time Goes By... (Candid, 1997)
- Braff Plays Wimbledon: First Set (Zephyr, 1997)
- Braff Plays Wimbledon: The Second Set (Zephyr, 1998)
- The Concord Jazz Heritage Series (Concord Jazz, 1998)
- Born to Play (Arbors, 1999)
- Watch What Happens (Arbors, 2002)

With Kenny Davern

- One Hour Tonight (Musicmasters, 1988)
- I'll See You in My Dreams (Musicmasters, 1989)
- Breezin' Along (Arbors, 1997)
- The Jazz KENNection (Arbors, 2001)

With Barbara Lea

- Hoagy's Children: Songs of Hoagy Carmichael Volume One (Audiophile, 1994)
- Hoagy's Children: Songs of Hoagy Carmichael Volume Two (Audiophile, 1994)
- Stardust Melody/Beloved and Rare Songs of Hoagy Carmichael (A Records, 2001)

With Susannah McCorkle

- I'll Take Romance (Concord Jazz, 1992)
- From Bessie to Brazil (Concord Jazz, 1993)
- Easy to Love: The Songs of Cole Porter (Concord Jazz, 1996)
- Someone to Watch Over Me: The Songs of George Gershwin (Concord Jazz, 1998)

With Ken Peplowski

- Sonny Side (Concord Jazz, 1989)
- Illuminations (Concord Jazz, 1991)
- Steppin' with Peps (Concord Jazz, 1993)
- Live at Ambassador Auditorium (Concord Jazz, 1994)
- It's a Lonesome Old Town (Concord Jazz, 1995)
- Grenadilla (Concord Jazz, 1998)
- Gypsy Lamento (Venus, 2008)

With Flip Phillips

- A Real Swinger (Concord Jazz, 1988)
- Try a Little Tenderness (Chiaroscuro, 1993)
- Swing Is the Thing (Verve, 2000)
- Celebrates His 80th Birthday at the March of Jazz 1995 (Arbors, 2003)

With Bucky Pizzarelli

- A Portrait (Stash, 1992)
- Stringin' the Blues: A Tribute to Eddie Lang with Frank Vignola, Al Viola, Marty Grosz (Jazzology, 2003)
- Hot Club of 52nd Street with Johnny Frigo (Chesky, 2004)

With Randy Sandke

- Calling All Cats (Concord Jazz, 1996)
- The Re-discovered Louis and Bix (Nagel-Heyer, 2000)
- The Music of Bob Haggart (Arbors, 2002)
- Unconventional Wisdom (Arbors, 2008)

With Bobby Short

- Swing That Music (Telarc, 1993)
- How's Your Romance? (Telarc, 1999)
- You're the Top: Love Songs of Cole Porter (Telarc, 1999)

With Warren Vaché Jr.

- Easy Going (Concord Jazz, 1987)
- Talk to Me Baby (Muse, 1996)
- Mrs. Vache's Boys (Nagel-Heyer, 1999)

With others

- Harry Allen, I'll Never Be the Same (Master Mix, 1994)
- Harry Allen, Love Songs Live! (Nagel-Heyer, 2000)
- Steve Allen, Steve Allen Plays Jazz Tonight (Concord Jazz, 1993)
- Karrin Allyson, Scott Hamilton, Concord Jazz, Festival All-Stars, Fujitsu-Concord 27th Jazz Festival (Concord 1996)
- Dan Barrett, Strictly Instrumental (Concord Jazz, 1987)
- Joe Bushkin, Play It Again, Joe (United Artists 1977)
- Charlie Byrd, The Washington Guitar Quintet (Concord Jazz, 1992)
- Judy Carmichael, Pearls (Jazzology, 1991)
- Benny Carter, In the Mood for Swing (Musicmasters, 1988)
- Dave Cliff, When Lights Are Low (Zephyr, 1998)
- Banu Gibson, Let's Face The Music and Dance (Swing Out, 2006)
- Scott Hamilton, Ken Peplowski, Groovin' High (Concord Jazz, 1992)
- Milt Hinton, The Basement Tapes (Chiaroscuro, 1989)
- Dick Hyman, Cheek to Cheek (Arbors, 1996)
- Nigel Kennedy, Kennedy Meets Gershwin (Warner Classics 2018)
- Butch Miles, More Miles... More Standards (Famous Door, 1985)
- Butch Miles, Cookin' (Nagel-Heyer, 1995)
- Doug Munro, The Harry Warren Songbook (GotMusic,)
- Mel Powell, The Return of Mel Powel (Chiaroscuro, 1989)
- Leon Redbone, Red to Blue (August, 1985)
- Mavis Rivers, It's a Good Day ((Delos,) 1984)
- Norman Simmons, 13th Moon (Milljac 1991)
- Andy Stein, Goin' Places (Stomp Off, 1987)
- Loren Schoenberg, Solid Ground (Musicmasters, 1988)
- Carol Sloane, When I Look in Your Eyes (Concord Jazz, 1994)
- Richard Stoltzman, the Essential Clarinet (RCA Victor 1992)
- Howard Shore, The Aviator (Decca/UMG, 2004)
- Tom Talbert, This Is Living! (Pipe Dream Chartmaker 1997)
- Frank Tate, Live in Belfast (Nagel-Heyer, 2001)
- Mel Torme, A Tribute to Bing Crosby (Concord Jazz, 1994)
- Allan Vache, Jim Galloway, Raisin' the Roof (Nagel-Heyer, 2000)
- Terry Waldo, Footlight Varieties (Stomp Off, 1990)
- George Wein, Swing That Music (Columbia, 1993)
- Bob Wilber, Bufadora Blow-up (Arbors, 1997)
- Chuck Wilson, Echo of Spring (Arbors, 2010)
- Lillette Jenkins & Doc Cheatham, The Music of Lil Hardin Armstrong (Chiaroscuro, 1988)
