= Aaron Weinstein =

American musician

- Born: Aaron Jacob Weinstein; July 31, 1985 (age 40); Seattle, Washington, U.S.
- Occupation: Musician
- Instruments: Violin, guitar, mandolin
- Years active: 2008–present
- Label: Arbors
- Website: www.aaronweinstein.net

Aaron Jacob Weinstein (born July 31, 1985), is an American musician.

== Music career ==
While still attending New Trier High School in Winnetka, Illinois, Weinstein founded the Stephane Grappelli Tribute Trio, which was named best high school instrumental jazz group by Down Beat magazine in 2002. He attended the Berklee College of Music in Boston, Massachusetts on a four-year scholarship.

When he was 19, he recorded his debut album, A Handful of Stars (Arbors, 2005), featuring Bucky Pizzarelli, John Pizzarelli, Nicki Parrott, Houston Person, and Joe Ascione. He has also recorded with Frank Vignola and J. Geils.

== Discography ==
Released	Album	Notes	Label
1999	Fiddler's Dream	Debut	Corner Kitchen
2002	Jazz Violin	EP	Corner Kitchen
2003	Legends	with Bucky Pizzarelli & Skitch Henderson	Arbors
2005	A Handful of Stars		Arbors
2006	Jay Geils, Gerry Beaudoin & The King of Strings	with J. Geils & Gerry Beaudoin	Arbors
2006	Jazz Mandolin	EP	Corner Kitchen
2008	Blue Too	with John Pizzarelli	Arbors
2013	Lucky Day		Birdland
