= Nicki Parrott =

Australian jazz vocalist and bassist (born 1970)

- Born: 1970 (age 55–56); Newcastle, New South Wales, Australia
- Genres: Jazz, swing, easy listening
- Occupations: Musician, vocalist
- Instrument: Double bass
- Years active: 2000–present
- Labels: Venus, Arbors
- Website: www.nickiparrott.com

Nicki Parrott (pronounced pa-ROTT) is a jazz vocalist and bass player from Australia.

== Background ==
Parrott took piano lessons when she was four years old, then learned flute. When she was fifteen, she started playing double bass, and after graduating from high school she studied at the New South Wales Conservatorium of Music in Sydney, Australia. While in school, she performed with Australian musicians Dale Barlow and Mike Nock and with American musicians Chuck Findley and Bobby Shew.

== Career ==
She moved to New York City in 1994 and continued her education on bass with Rufus Reid. Her teachers also included Ray Brown and John Clayton. For several years she played bass guitar and sang backing vocals for an R&B band in Manhattan. She started a trio with John Tropea and David Spinozza. In 2000, she became the bassist for Les Paul in his trio's weekly performances at a club in Manhattan. She appeared in two documentaries about Paul: Chasing Sound and Thank You, Les.

Parrott recorded her first album, Awabakal Suite (2001), with her sister, Lisa Parrott. She had roles on Broadway in the musicals Jekyll & Hyde and You're a Good Man, Charlie Brown. Her first solo album, Moon River, was released in 2008 and consisted of jazz standards. She has recorded tribute albums to Burt Bacharach, Nat King Cole, Doris Day, Blossom Dearie, Peggy Lee, and the Carpenters.

== Awards and honors ==
- Best Vocal Album, Swing Journal, Moon River, 2007; Fly Me to the Moon, 2008
- Golden Disc Award, Swing Journal, Black Coffee, 2010

== Discography ==
=== As leader ===
- Awabakal Suite with Lisa Parrott (Monkey Pants, 2004)
- Moon River (Venus, 2007)
- People Will Say We're in Love with Rossano Sportiello (Arbors, 2007)
- Do It Again with Rossano Sportiello (Arbors, 2009)
- Fly Me to the Moon (Venus, 2009)
- Black Coffee (Venus, 2010)
- Can't Take My Eyes Off You (Venus, 2011)
- Like a Lover with Ken Peplowski (Venus, 2011)
- Sakura Sakura (Venus, 2012)
- Summertime (Venus, 2012)
- Autumn Leaves (Venus, 2012)
- Winter Wonderland (Venus, 2012)
- Live at the Jazz Corner with Rossano Sportiello, Eddie Metz (Arbors, 2012)
- The Last Time I Saw Paris (Venus, 2013)
- The Look of Love (Venus, 2014)
- Angel Eyes (Venus, 2014)
- It's a Good Day with Rossano Sportiello, Eddie Metz (Arbors, 2014)
- Sentimental Journey (Venus, 2015)
- Two Songbirds of a Feather with Rebecca Kilgore (Arbors, 2015)
- From Joplin to Jobim with Engelbert Wrobel, Paolo Alderighi, Stephanie Trick (Wrobel, 2016)
- Yesterday Once More: The Carpenters Song Book (Venus, 2016)
- Strictly Confidential with Rossano Sportiello, Eddie Metz (Arbors, 2016)
- Dear Blossom (Arbors, 2017)
- Unforgettable (Venus, 2017)
- Mambo to Tango (Wrobel, 2018)
- Close to You (Venus, 2018)
- Stompin' at the Savoy: A Tribute To Ella & Louis with Byron Stripling (Venus, 2018)
- New York to Paris (Arbors, 2019)
- If You Could Read My Mind (Arbors, 2021)

=== As guest ===
With David Krakauer

- A New Hot One (Label Bleu, 2000)
- The Twelve Tribes (Label Bleu, 2002)
- Live in Krakow (Label Bleu, 2003)
- Bubbemeises (Label Bleu, 2005)

With Chuck Redd

- For George, Cole, and Duke (Blue Heron, 2014)
- Groove City (Dalphine, 2018)

With others

- Muriel Anderson, Wildcat (2005)
- Johnny Frigo, Johnny Frigo's DNA Exposed! (Arbors, 2001)
- Skitch Henderson & Bucky Pizzarelli, Legends (Arbors, 2003)
- Rebecca Kilgore, The Music of Jimmy Van Heusen (Jump, 2005)
- Ken Peplowski, Sunrise (Arbors, 2018)
- Randy Sandke - Unconventional Wisdom (Arbors, 2008)
- Antti Sarpila, We'd Like New York...In June! (Arbors, 2009)
- Derek Smith, High Energy (Arbors, 2001)
- Warren Vaché-John Allred Quintet, Jubilation (Arbors, 2008)
- Johnny Varro, All That Jazz (Arbors, 2001)
- Deborah Weisz, Grace (Va Wah, 2005)
- John Wetton, Les Paul and His Trio, New York Minute (2015)
- Rachel Z, First Time Ever I Saw Your Face (2003)
