= Rick Fay =

American jazz musician

Rick Fay (December 25, 1926 – March 22, 1999) was an American jazz clarinetist and saxophonist.

Fay was born in Chicago. He worked for the Disney music studios for 24 years, and performed often at Disney World. He also freelanced with Wild Bill Davison, Pete Dailey, and Firehouse Five Plus Two, among others. He recorded as one half of "Rick and Paul" on Accent Records in the mid-1960s. His first album "Live at Lone Pine" was recorded in 1989 and released on Arbors Records. Several further releases followed on the label before Fay's death in 1999. His later associations as a sideman include work with Jackie Coon, Dan Barrett, and Johnny Varro.

== Discography ==
- Live at Lone Pine (Arbors, 1989)
- Hello Horn (Arbors, 1990)
- Memories of You (Arbors, 1991)
- Glendena Forever (Arbors, 1991)
- Sax-o-Poem Poetry and Jazz (Arbors, 1992)
- Rick Fay's Endangered Species (Arbors, 1993)
- Poetry and Jazz (Arbors, 1993)
- Live at the State (Arbors, 1996)
- Oh Baby (Arbors, 1996)
- Rolling On (Arbors, 1996)
- This Is Where I Came In (Arbors, 1996)
- Words Among the Reeds (Arbors, 1998)
- Rick Fay With Strings (Arbors, 1999)
