= Rebecca Kilgore =

American jazz vocalist (1949–2026)

- Born: September 24, 1949; Waltham, Massachusetts, U.S.
- Died: January 7, 2026 (aged 76) Portland, Oregon, U.S.
- Genres: Vocal jazz, swing, western swing
- Occupations: Musician, vocalist
- Instruments: Vocals, rhythm guitar
- Years active: 1980–2024
- Labels: Arbors, Jazzology, Audiophile
- Website: www.rebeccakilgore.com

Rebecca Kilgore (September 24, 1949 – January 7, 2026) was an American jazz vocalist based in Portland, Oregon. She has been called "one of the best interpreters of the Great American Songbook". She performed with jazz pianist and composer Dave Frishberg, trombonist Dan Barrett, tenor saxophonist Harry Allen, pianist Keith Ingham, and many other musicians.

== Early life ==
Rebecca Louise Kilgore was born and grew up in Waltham, Massachusetts. She was the younger of two daughters born to Jean (Schaufus) Kilgore and George Mallard Kilgore, who worked in sales and served as choir director to a Unitarian church. He introduced his daughter to concepts of music theory and harmony.

In a profile by Christopher Loudon in Jazz Times, Kilgore recalled "When I was in high school, I was into Joan Baez and Judy Collins and people like that. I got a guitar and strummed along. Then I discovered a disc jockey in the area who played classic jazz. I got acquainted with Billie Holiday and Ella Fitzgerald and Anita O'Day and just flipped. ... They were my teachers, because I never had any formal training."

In the late 1970s, Kilgore visited her sister in Portland, Oregon. She then made Portland her home base for the next five decades of her life and career.

== Career ==
Kilgore frequented the Portland music scene. She became close friends with a woman jazz musician in the local group Wholly Cats. When her friend left the group, Kilgore was encouraged to try out a role as rhythm guitarist and singer.

Her debut recording is the Wholly Cats LP, Doggin' Around, released in 1982. Drummer Hal Smith also performed on that album. Kilgore went on to work on a number of Hal Smith's projects, including 10 CDs released on the Triangle and Jazzology labels from 1995 until 2000.

Through the 1980s and into the early 1990s she primarily worked with Pacific Northwest regional musicians. She joined Western swing outfit Ranch Dressing and appeared on fiddle champion Hollis Taylor's Twisted Fiddle CD. Jazz pianist and composer David Frishberg first heard her playing with Wholly Cats in 1981. In 1991 he recruited her to sing in a regular duo gig at Portland's downtown Heathman Hotel.

In addition to regular vocal work allowing her to give up her last day job, Frishberg's national following and connections accelerated Kilgore's progress into her role as an interpreter of the American Songbook. She and Frishberg released three CDs as a duo, as well as playing together in small group recordings.

From the mid-1990s through the early 2020s, she worked constantly, organizing and collaborating with jazz, swing, and western swing musicians, headlining and appearing on over 70 CDs. Her most prominent label, Arbors Records, released 24 CDs with her vocals, spanning the years 1994 to 2016.

She appeared live locally, nationally, and internationally. Venues included festivals, concerts, cabarets, and jazz cruises. Her recorded work is found on over 20 different labels. From 1995 until 2020, she also featured on the National Public Radio program Fresh Air. Host Terry Gross stated during a memorial segment "I think Becky did more concerts on our show than any other performer."

== Awards ==
- Oregon Music Hall of Fame in 2010.
- Jazz Society of Oregon Hall of Fame in 2010
- Jazz Legend, San Diego Jazz Party in 2016
- Portland Jazz Master, PDX Jazz in 2022

== Personal life and death ==
In 2002 Kilgore married trumpeter Dick Titterington. She died in hospice care on January 7, 2026, at the age of 76; she had had Lewy body dementia for some time.

== Discography ==
- Looking at You with Dave Frishberg (PHD Music, 1994)
- I Saw Stars with Dave Frishberg (Arbors, 1994)
- Cactus Setup with Jim Mason (PHD, 1995)
- Swing, Brother, Swing with the California Swing Cats (Jazzology, 1995)
- Not a Care in the World with Dave Frishberg (Arbors, 1996)
- Rhythm, Romance ... and Roadrunners with Hal Smith's Roadrunners (Triangle, 1996)
- Hal Smith's Roadrunners Vol. 2 (Triangle, 1997)
- Stealin' Apples with the California Swing Cats (Jazzology, 1997)
- Absolutely: Hal Smith's Roadrunners Vol. 3 (Triangle, 1998)
- It's Easy to Remember (Orb, 1998)
- Jump Presents Rebecca Kilgore (Jump, 1999)
- Concentratin' on Fats (Jazzology, 1999)
- Portland to San Diego with Hal Smith's Rhythmakers (Jazzology, 1999)
- Waiting at the End of the Road: Hal Smith's Roadrunners Vol. 4 (Triangle, 2001)
- Moments Like This (Heavywood, 2001)
- The Starlit Hour with Dave Frishberg (Arbors, 2001)
- Rebecca Kilgore with the Keith Ingham Sextet (Jump, 2001)
- A Remembrance of Maxine Sullivan: Harlem Butterfly (Audiophile, 2001)
- For Lovers Only (Cactus World Jazz, 2003)
- Jump Presents the Music of Jimmy Van Heusen (Jump, 2005)
- Make Someone Happy: A Further Remembrance of Maxine Sullivan (Audiophile, 2005)
- Winter Warm with Tom Grant (2007)
- I Wish You Love with Lyle Ritz (PDX Uke, 2007)
- Why Fight the Feeling? (Arbors, 2008)
- Bossa Style with Lyle Ritz (PDX Uke, 2009)
- Rebecca Kilgore Sings the Music of Jerome Kern (Audiophile, 2010)
- Yes, Indeed! (Blue Swing, 2010)
- Just Imagine (Blue Swing, 2014)
- I Like Men (Arbors, 2014)
- Two Songbirds of a Feather with Nicki Parrott (Arbors, 2015)
- Moonshadow Dance (Cherry Pie Music, 2016)
- This and That with Bernd Lhotzky (Arbors, 2016)
- Winter Days at Schloss Elmau with Bernd Lhotzky Echoes of Swing (ACT Music+Vision, 2019)
- Rebecca Kilgore & Andy Brown Together Live (Heavywood, 2020)
- The Rebecca Kilgore Trio Vol. 1 (Heavywood, 2021)
- A Little Taste: A Tribute to Dave Frishberg (Cherry Pie, 2024)

With BED

- Get Ready for BED (Blue Swing, 2002)
- BEDlam (Blue Swing, 2004)
- Watch Out (Blue Swing, 2006)
- BED Four + 1 (Blue Swing, 2008)

With Hollis Taylor

- Twisted Fiddle (Gleeful, 1991)

With Tall Jazz

- Winter Jazz (PHD, 1993)
- Winter Jazz II (PHD, 1997)

With Wholly Cats

- Doggin' Around (Grassroots, 1982)

With Woody Hite Big Band

- Sentimental Swing (Medikal, 2001)

=== As guest ===
With Harry Allen

- Harry Allen-Joe Cohn Quartet Performs Music from Guys and Dolls (Arbors, 2007)
- Harry Allen-Joe Cohn Quartet Plays Music from South Pacific (Arbors, 2009)
- Harry Allen Quintet Plays Music from The Sound of Music (Arbors, 2011)
- Live at Feinstein's at Loews Regency: Celebrating Lady Day and Prez (Arbors, 2011)
- Some Like It Hot: The Music of Marilyn Monroe (Swing Bros, 2012)

With Dan Barrett

- Moon Song (Arbors, 1998)
- Blue Swing (Arbors, 2000)
- Being a Bear: Jazz for the Whole Family (Arbors, 2000)

With Bucky Pizzarelli

- Back in the Saddle Again (Arbors, 2009)
- Diggin' Up Bones (Arbors, 2009)
- Pizzarelli Party (Arbors, 2009)
- Rebecca Kilgores's Lovefest at the Pizzarelli Party (Arbors, 2010)

With John Sheridan

- Dream Band, Make Me Some More (Arbors, 1999)
- Get Rhythm in Your Feet (Arbors, 2002)
- Easy as It Gets (Arbors, 2005)
- Swing is Still the King (Arbors, 2007)
- Hooray for Christmas (Arbors, 2010)

With others

- Lars Erstrand, Meets Rebecca Kilgore (Gemini, 2003)
- Dave Frishberg, Quality Time (Sterling, 1994)
- Tom Morrell and the Time Warp Tophands, Jugglin' Cats (WR Records, 2000)
- Tom Morrell and the Time Warp Tophands, Monkey Business (WR Records, 2006)
