= Dan Barrett (jazz musician) =

American arranger, cornetist, and trombonist

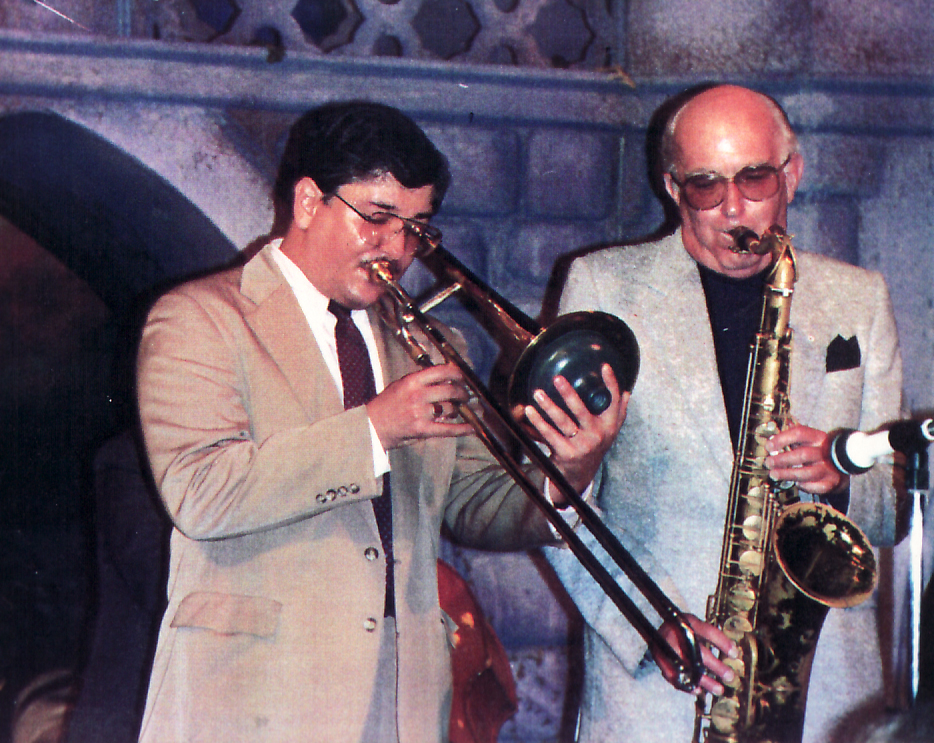
- Barrett and Fraser MacPherson in 1989

Background information
- Born: December 14, 1955 (age 69); Pasadena, California, U.S.
- Genres: Jazz
- Occupation: Musician
- Instruments: Cornet; trombone
- Labels: Arbors

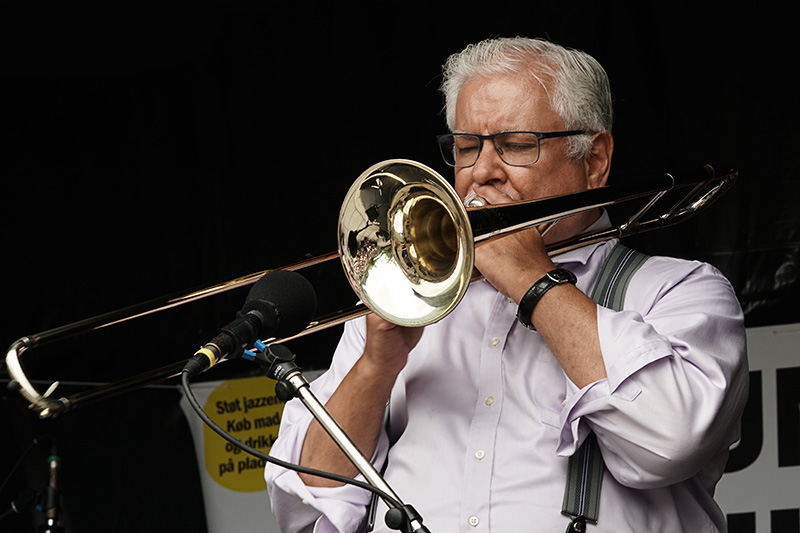
Dan Barrett at Copenhagen Jazz Festival 2018

Dan Barrett (born December 14, 1955, in Pasadena, California) is an American arranger, cornetist, and trombonist.

The earliest mention of Dan Barrett was in the Melody Maker, 10 February 1973, which reported that he played "Ory's Creole Trombone" at the end of Kid Ory's Funeral on 28 January that year. He also played with Teddy Buckner, Andy Blakeney, and Alton Redd, all members of Ory's band, during the funeral proceedings.

Barrett played valve trombone on the soundtrack to the film, The Cotton Club, in 1984.

In addition to leading a quintet with Howard Alden, Barrett has performed as a sideman with Benny Goodman and Buck Clayton. Barrett is the musical director for Arbors Records in Clearwater, Florida.

== Discography ==
=== As leader ===
- Strictly Instrumental (Concord Jazz, 1987)
- Let's Be Buddies with George Masso (Arbors, 1994)
- Reunion with Al (Arbors, 1995)
- Two Sleepy People with John Sheridan (Arbors, 1996)
- In Australia with Tom Baker (Arbors, 1997)
- Moon Song with Rebecca Kilgore (Arbors, 1998)
- Being a Bear: Jazz for the Whole Family with Rebecca Kilgore (Arbors, 2000)
- Dan Barrett's International Swing Party (Nagel-Heyer, 2000)
- Blue Swing (Arbors, 2000)
- Melody in Swing (Arbors, 2000)

With Howard Alden

- Swing Street (Concord Jazz, 1988)
- The ABQ Salutes Buck Clayton (Concord Jazz, 1989)
- Swing That Music (Telarc, 1993)
- Live in '95 (Arbors, 2004)

With BED

- Get Ready for BED! (Blue Swing, 2006)
- Watch Out! (Blue Swing, 2006)

=== As sideman ===
With Leon Redbone

- Red to Blue (August 1985)
- Sugar (Private Music, 1990)
- Any Time (Blue Thumb 2001)

With Randy Sandke

- Stampede (Jazzology, 1992)
- The Bix Beiderbecke Era (Nagel-Heyer, 1993)
- New York Allstars Play Jazz Favorites (Nagel-Heyer, 1993)
- Count Basie Remembered Volume One (Nagel-Heyer, 1997)
- Count Basie Remembered Volume Two (Nagel-Heyer, 1997)
- The Re-discovered Louis and Bix (Nagel-Heyer, 2000)
- Randy Sandke Meets Bix Beiderbecke (Nagel-Heyer, 2002)

With others

- Joe Bushkin, Play It Again, Joe (United Artists, 1977)
- Graeme Bell, Graeme Bell in Holland with the Graeme Bell All Stars (Sea Horse, 1982)
- John Barry, The Cotton Club (Geffen, 1984)
- Butch Miles, More Miles... More Standards (Famous Door, 1985)
- Rosemary Clooney, Rosemary Clooney Sings the Lyrics of Johnny Mercer (Concord Jazz, 1987)
- Marty Grosz, Sings of Love and Other Matters (Statiras, 1987)
- Warren Vaché Jr., Easy Going (Concord Jazz, 1987)
- Peter Ecklund, Peter Ecklund and the Melody Makers (Stomp Off, 1988)
- Buck Clayton, A Swingin' Dream (Stash, 1989)
- Marty Grosz, Unsaturated Fats (Stomp Off, 1990)
- Terry Waldo, Footlight Varieties (Stomp Off, 1990)
- Jim Cullum Jr., New Year's All Star Jam (Pacific Vista, 1993)
- Kenny Davern, East Side, West Side (Arbors, 1994)
- Keith Ingham, Marty Grosz Just Imagine (Stomp Off, 1994)
- Scott Robinson, Thinking Big (Arbors, 1997)
- John Sheridan, Something Tells Me (Arbors, 1997)
- Bob Wilber, Bufadora Blow-up (Arbors, 1997)
- Bob Wilber, Everywhere You Go There's Jazz (Arbors, 1999)
- Bobby Short, How's Your Romance? (Telarc, 1999)
- Ed Polcer, Let's Hit It (BlewZ Manor 2003)
- Rebecca Kilgore, Jump Presents the Music of Jimmy Van Heusen (Jump, 2005)
- Trevor Richards, Legends of the Swing Era (Edition 5)
