= Louis Mazetier =

French musician

Louis Mazetier (born February 17, 1960, Paris) is a French stride pianist.

== Career ==
Mazetier began playing jazz at age 14 and by age 18 was performing at jazz clubs in Paris. In addition to his career as a musician, he works full-time as a radiologist. He plays with Paris Washboard and has worked on record with Dick Hyman, Francois Rilhac, Alain Marquet, and Neville Dickie, among others, and has released multiple albums as a leader or co-leader. Although he is influenced by earlier jazz pianists, such as Eubie Blake, James P. Johnson, Fats Waller, Don Ewell, Johnny Guarnieri, Dick Wellstood, and Art Tatum, his greatest influence appears to be American stride pianist, Donald Lambert.

== Discography ==
- Echoes of Carolina (Stomp Off, 1991)
- If Dreams Come True (Stomp Off, 1996)
- Harlem Strut (Stomp Off, 1996)
- Tributes, Portraits and Other Stories (Arbors, 2008)
