= Clint Baker =

American musician

Clint Baker (born January 27, 1971, in Mountain View, California) is an American traditional jazz musician performing on cornet, trumpet, trombone, clarinet, saxophone, guitar, banjo, tuba, string bass, and drums.

== Career ==
Clint produced his first record in 1991: “Clint Baker’s New Orleans Jazz Band Featuring Jim Klippert”. Since then, he has produced 8 recordings including: "In The Groove" (1992), "Going Huge" (1998), "Tears" (2002), and “Who’s Foolin’ Who?” (2008).

Clint Baker’s New Orleans Jazz Band appeared at the New Orleans Jazz and Heritage Festival in 1992 and at the Monterey Jazz Festival in 1999. The band toured festivals in the US and Canada extensively and was voted one of the top five Favorite New (Emerging) Jazz Bands in the 1998 Mississippi Rag Trad Jazz and Ragtime Poll. (In the same poll Baker was voted one of the top three Favorite New (Emerging) Musicians.)

== Selected discography ==
- In the Groove - Clint Baker's New Orleans Jazz Band - Burgundy Street
- Sugar Blues - Chris Tyle's Silver Leaf Jazz Band - Stomp Off
- In the Gutter - International Jazz Band - Jazz Crusade
- Ninety and Still Delivering - Narvin Kimball - DanSun
- Chasin' the Blues - Jim Cullum Jazz Band - Riverwalk
- Yama Yama Man - The Yerba Buena Stompers - Stomp Off
- Bohemian Maestro - The Hot Club of San Francisco - Azica
- Whatever Works (Official Motion Picture Soundtrack) - Tom Sharpsteen And His Orlandos - Razor & Tie
