= Warren Vaché =

Warren Vaché may refer to:

- Warren Vaché Sr. (1914–2005), American jazz musician and journalist
- Warren Vaché Jr. (born 1951), American jazz trumpeter, cornetist, and flugelhornist, son of Warren Vaché Sr.
