= Dick Hyman =

American jazz pianist and composer (born 1927)

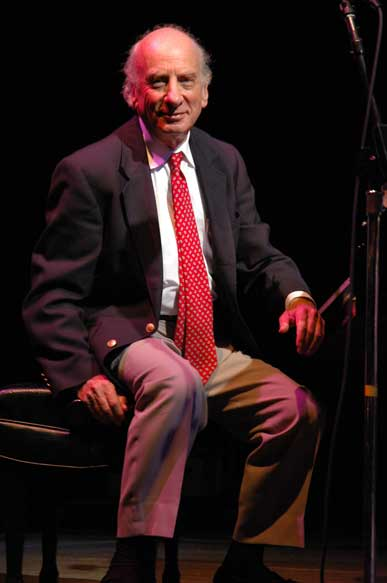
- Hyman (Eugene, Oregon, 2005)

Background information
- Born: Richard Hyman; March 8, 1927 (age 99); New York City, New York, U.S.
- Genres: Jazz, swing, lounge, stride piano
- Occupations: Musician, composer
- Instruments: Piano, organ
- Years active: 1940s–present
- Labels: MGM, Command, MCA, Concord Jazz, Chiaroscuro, Arbors
- Website: www.dickhyman.com

Richard Hyman (born March 8, 1927) is an American jazz pianist and composer. Over a 70-year career, he has worked as a pianist, organist, arranger, music director, electronic musician, and composer. He was named a National Endowment for the Arts Jazz Masters fellow in 2017.

As a pianist, Hyman has been praised for his versatility. DownBeat magazine characterized him as "a pianist of longstanding grace and bountiful talent, with an ability to adapt to nearly any historical style, from stride to bop to modernist sound-painting.". A masterful improviser, he is also a composer of concerti and chamber music, and the soundtrack composer/arranger for more than a dozen Woody Allen films. In addition, he launched the acclaimed Jazz in July series at the 92nd Street Y in New York City and served as its artistic director for 20 years.

His daughter Judy Hyman is a founding member of The Horse Flies, an American alternative rock/folk band based in Ithaca, New York. His grandson is designer and artist Adam Charlap Hyman.

== Early life ==
Hyman was born in New York City on March 8, 1927 to Joseph C. Hyman and Lee Roven (née Rovinsky), and grew up in suburban Mount Vernon, New York. His older brother, Arthur, owned a jazz record collection and introduced him to the music of Bix Beiderbecke and Art Tatum.

Hyman was trained classically by his mother's brother, the concert pianist Anton Rovinsky, who premiered The Celestial Railroad by Charles Ives in 1928. Hyman said of Rovinsky: "He was my most important teacher. I learned touch from him and a certain amount of repertoire, especially Beethoven. On my own I pursued Chopin. I loved his ability to take a melody and embellish it in different arbitrary ways, which is exactly what we do in jazz. Chopin would have been a terrific jazz pianist! His waltzes are in my improvising to this day.".

Hyman enlisted in the U.S. Army in June 1945, and was transferred to the U.S. Navy band department. "Once I got into the band department, I was working with much more experienced musicians than I was used to," Hyman once stated. "I’d played in a couple of kid bands in New York, playing dances, but the Navy meant business — I had to show up, read music, and be with a bunch of better players than I had run into." After leaving the Navy he attended Columbia University. While there, Hyman won a piano competition, for which the prize was 12 free lessons with swing-era pianist Teddy Wilson. Hyman has said that he "fell in love with jazz" during this period.

After graduating from Columbia, Hyman married his wife, Julia, in 1948.

== Career ==
Relax Records released Hyman's solo piano versions of "All the Things You Are" and "You Couldn't Be Cuter" around 1950. He recorded two honky-tonk piano albums under the pseudonym "Knuckles O'Toole" (including two original compositions), and recorded more as "Willie the Rock Knox" and "Slugger Ryan".

As a studio musician in the 1950s and early 1960s, Hyman performed with Tony Bennett, Perry Como, Guy Mitchell, Joni James, Marvin Rainwater, Ivory Joe Hunter, LaVern Baker, Ruth Brown, The Playmates, The Wildcats, The Kookie Cats, The Four Freshmen, The Four Sophomores, Johnny Mathis, Mitch Miller, and many more. He played with Charlie Parker for Parker's only film appearance. His extensive television studio work in New York in the 1950s and early 1960s included a stint as music director for Arthur Godfrey's television show from 1959 to 1961.

Hyman has worked as composer, arranger, conductor, and pianist for the Woody Allen films Stardust Memories, Zelig, The Purple Rose of Cairo, Broadway Danny Rose, Hannah and Her Sisters, Radio Days, Bullets Over Broadway, Everyone Says I Love You, Sweet and Lowdown, The Curse of the Jade Scorpion and Melinda and Melinda. His other film scores include French Quarter, Moonstruck, Scott Joplin, The Lemon Sisters and Alan and Naomi. His music has also been heard in Mask, Billy Bathgate, Two Weeks Notice, and other films. He was music director of The Movie Music of Woody Allen, which premiered at the Hollywood Bowl.

Hyman composed and performed the score for the Cleveland/San Jose Ballet Company's Piano Man, and Twyla Tharp's The Bum's Rush for the American Ballet Theatre. He was the pianist/conductor/arranger in Tharp's Eight Jelly Rolls, Baker's Dozen, and The Bix Pieces and similarly arranged and performed for Miles Davis: Porgy and Bess, a choreographed production of the Dance Theater of Dallas. In 2007, his Adventures of Tom Sawyer, commissioned by the John G. Shedd Institute for the Arts and produced for the stage by Toni Pimble of the Eugene Ballet, premiered in Eugene, Oregon.

In the 1960s, Hyman recorded several pop albums on Enoch Light's Command Records. At first, he used the Lowrey organ, on the albums Electrodynamics (US No. 117), Fabulous (US No. 132), Keyboard Kaleidoscope and The Man from O.R.G.A.N. He later recorded several albums on the Moog synthesizer which mixed original compositions and cover versions, including Moog: The Electric Eclectics of Dick Hyman (Can No. 35) and The Age of Electronicus (US No. 110).

The track "The Minotaur" from The Electric Eclectics (1969) charted in the US top 40 (US R&B Singles No. 27; Hot 100 No. 38) (No. 20 Canada), becoming the first Moog single hit (although, as originally released on 45, it was the B-side to the shorter "Topless Dancers of Corfu"). Some elements from the track "The Moog and Me" (most notably the whistle that serves as the song's lead-in) on the same album were sampled by Beck for the track "Sissyneck" on his 1996 album Odelay. Hyman has been a guest performer at jazz festivals and concert venues. Around 1995, Hyman and his wife, Julia, moved permanently to Venice, Florida. Julia Hyman died June 16, 2025.

== Discography ==
=== As leader ===
Year recorded	Year released	Title	Label	Notes
1953	1953	September Song: Dick Hyman Plays the Music of Kurt Weill	Proscenium	Solo piano
1953	1953	Conversation Piece: Dick Hyman Plays the Music of Noel Coward	Proscenium	Solo piano
1953	2009	Autumn in New York: Dick Hyman Plays the Music of Vernon Duke	Proscenium	Solo piano
1955?	1955	Ragtime Piano (MH 33-147)	Waldorf Music Hall	As Willie "The Rock" Knox And His Orchestra
1955?	1955	Ragtime Piano (MH 33-151)	Waldorf Music Hall	As Willie "The Rock" Knox And His Orchestra
1955?	1955	Swingin' Double Date	Lion	Trio
1955?	1955	The Dick Hyman Trio Swings	MGM	Trio
1956	1956	The Unforgettable Sound of the Dick Hyman Trio	MGM	Trio
1956	1956	Beside a Shady Nook	MGM	Trio
1956		The Swinging Seasons	MGM	Trio
1957	1957	Hi Fi Suite	MGM	With Joe Newman (trumpet), Thad Jones (trumpet), Benny Powell (trombone), Bill Barber (tuba), Jerome Richardson (alto saxophone, piccolo), Frank Wess (tenor saxophone, flute), Romeo Penque (clarinet, baritone saxophone), Phil Bodner (baritone saxophone, oboe), Don Elliott (vibraphone, percussion), Oscar Pettiford (bass), Eddie Safranski (bass), Osie Johnson (drums), Kenny Clarke (drums), Don Lamond (drums)
1957	1957	60 Great All Time Songs - Volumes 1–6	MGM	Quartet
1957	1957	Dick Hyman & Harpsichord in Hi Fi	MGM	Trio and orchestra
1958		Oh, Captain!	MGM	With various, including Harry "Sweets" Edison (trumpet), Coleman Hawkins (tenor sax), Art Farmer (trumpet), Tony Scott (reeds), Marilyn Moore, Jackie Paris and Osie Johnson (vocals)
1958	1958	Gigi	MGM	Trio, with Eddie Safranski (bass), Don Lamond (drums)
1958	1958	Knuckles O'Toole Plays the Greatest All-Time Ragtime Hits	Grand Award (reissued by ABC in 1974)	Trio (banjo and drums)
1960		After Six	MGM	Trio
1960	1960	Strictly Organ-ic	MGM	Quintet
1960		Provocative Piano	Command	With orchestra
1960		Provocative Piano, Vol. 2	Command	With orchestra
1961	1961	Dick Hyman and His Trio	Command	Trio, with Joe Benjamin (bass), Osie Johnson (drums)
1963	1963	Electrodynamics	Command	Quintet
1963		Fabulous	Command	
1963	1963	Moon Gas	MGM	With Mary Mayo
1964	1964	Keyboard Kaleidoscope	Command	With various, including Everett Barksdale, Bucky Pizzarelli, Bob Haggart, Osie Johnson, the Ray Charles Singers
1965	1965	The Man from O.R.G.A.N.	Command	
1966		I'll Never Be the Same	MGM	With strings
1966	1966	Happening!	Command	Hyman plays harpsichord
1967	1967	Brasilian Impressions	Command	With various
1968	1968	Mirrors	Command	
1968	1968	Sweet Sweet Soul	Command	With Bob Haggart (electric bass), Bob Rosengarden (drums)
1969	1969	Moog: The Electric Eclectics of Dick Hyman	Command	Hyman plays Moog
1969	1969	The Age of Electronicus	Command	Command label badge includes the banner "Electronic Pop Music".
1970	1970	Concerto Electro	Command	Command label badge includes the banner "Electronic Pop Music". LP rear cover states "Command / Probe Records".
1971	1971	The Sensuous Piano of "D"	Project	
1972		Solo Piano	Project	Solo piano
1972	1972	Grand Slam	Project	
1973	2002	An Evening at the Cookery, June 17, 1973	JRB	Solo piano; in concert
1973		Ragtime, Stomps and Stride	Project	
1974	1974	Genius at Play	Monmouth Evergreen	Solo piano
1974		Some Rags, Some Stomps, and a Little Blues	Columbia	
1974	1974	Let It Happen	RCA	As the Jazz Piano Quartet with Hank Jones, Marian McPartland and Roland Hanna
1975		Satchmo Remembered: The Music of Louis Armstrong at Carnegie Hall	Atlantic	With various; in concert
1975	1975	Charleston	Columbia	With various
1975	1975	Scott Joplin: The Complete Works for Piano	RCA	
1977		Scott Joplin	MCA	With various, including Hank Jones (piano)
1977		Themes and Variations on "A Child Is Born"	Chiaroscuro	Solo piano
1977	1994	A Waltz Dressed in Blue	Reference	Trio, with Michael Moore (bass), Ron Traxler (drums)
1978	1978	The Music of Jelly Roll Morton	Smithsonian	Some tracks solo piano; some tracks trio, with Bob Wilber (clarinet), Tommy Benford (drums); one track quartet; some tracks septet, with Wilber (clarinet), Warren Vaché (trumpet), Jack Gale (trombone), Marty Grosz (guitar, banjo), Major Holley (bass, tuba), Benford (drums)
1978	1978	Come and Trip It	New World	
1980	1980	Say It with Music	World Jazz	Quintet, with Pee Wee Erwin (trumpet), Bob Wilber (reeds), Milt Hinton (bass), Bobby Rosengarden (drums)
1981	1981	Cincinnati Fats	OVC-ATOS	
1981	1992	Live at Michael's Pub	JazzMania	Duo, with Roger Kellaway (piano); in concert
1983	1983	Kitten on the Keys: The Piano Music of Zez Confrey	RCA	Solo piano
1983		They Got Rhythm	Jazz Club of Sarasota	Duo, with Derek Smith (piano); live at Van Wezel Performing Arts Hall, Sarasota, Florida, February 9, 1983
1983–1988	2017	Solo at the Sacramento Jazz Festivals	Arbors	
1984	1984	Eubie	Sine Qua Non	Solo piano
1985	1996	Fireworks	Inner City	Duo, with Ruby Braff (cornet); in concert
1985		The Purple Rose of Cairo	MCA	Film soundtrack
1986	1986	Gulf Coast Blues	Stomp Off	Solo piano
1987	1988	Manhattan Jazz	Musicmasters	Duo, with Ruby Braff
1987	1987	Runnin' Ragged	Pro Jazz	Duo, with Stan Kurtis (violin)
1987	2005	Stridemonster!	Unisson	Most tracks duo, with Dick Wellstood (piano); one track each of solo piano
1988		At Chung's Chinese Restaurant	Musical Heritage Society	Solo piano; live at Chung's Chinese Restaurant, Cleveland, Ohio, September 26, 1985
1989	1989	The Kingdom of Swing and the Republic of Oop Bop Sh'bam	Musicmasters	With Joe Wilder (trumpet), Warren Vaché (cornet), Urbie Green (trombone), Buddy Tate (clarinet, tenor sax), Derek Smith (piano), Milt Hinton (bass), Butch Miles (drums)
1988	1988	Face the Music: A Century of Irving Berlin	Musical Heritage Society	Solo piano
1988	1988	Moonstruck	Capitol	Film soundtrack
1990	1990	Live from Toronto's Cafe Des Copains	Music & Arts	Solo piano; live at Cafe des Copains, Toronto, Canada, June, 1988
1990	1990	Blues in the Night (Dick Hyman Plays Harold Arlen)	Musicmasters	Solo
1990		Dick Hyman Plays Fats Waller	Reference	Solo piano
1989		Music from My Fair Lady	Concord Jazz	Duo, with Ruby Braff (cornet)
1990	1990	Music of 1937	Concord	Solo piano; in concert
1990	1991	Stride Piano Summit	Milestone	With Harry Sweets Edison (trumpet), Ralph Sutton, Jay McShann, Mike Lipskin (piano), Red Callender (bass), Harold Jones (drums)
1990		Plays Duke Ellington	Reference	Solo piano
1991		All Through the Night	Musicmasters	Solo piano; in concert
1993	1996	Gershwin Songbook: Hyman Variations	Musicmasters	Solo piano
1993		Dick Hyman/Ralph Sutton; Concord Duo Series, Vol. 6	Concord	Duo, with Ralph Sutton (piano); in concert
1994	1994	Marian McPartland's Piano Jazz		Some tracks solo piano; some tracks duo, with Marian McPartland (piano)
1994		Ruby Braff and Dick Hyman Play Nice Tunes	Arbors	with Ruby Braff
1994		The Piano Giants at Bob Haggart's 80th Birthday Party	Arbors	With Derek Smith and Ralph Sutton (piano), Bob Haggart (bass), Bobby Rosengarden (drums); in concert
1994	1994	From the Age of Swing	Reference	Some tracks octet, with Joe Wilder (trumpet), Urbie Green (trombone), Phil Bodner (alto sax, clarinet), Joe Temperley (baritone sax), Bucky Pizzarelli (guitar), Milt Hinton (bass), Butch Miles (drums); some tracks nonet, with Frank Wess (alto sax) added
1995	1996	Elegies, Mostly	Gemini	Duo, with Niels-Henning Ørsted Pedersen (bass)
1995	1996	Cheek to Cheek	Arbors	Trio, with Howard Alden (guitar), Bob Haggart (bass)
1996		Just You, Just Me	Sackville	Duo, with Ralph Sutton (piano)
1996?	1996	Swing Is Here	Reference	With Peter Appleyard (vibes), Ken Peplowski (clarinet), Randy Sandke (trumpet), Frank Wess (tenor sax), Bucky Pizzarelli (guitar), Jay Leonhart (bass), Butch Miles (drums); Nancy Marano (vocals) added on some tracks
1998?		In Recital	Reference	Solo piano; in concert
1998	1998	Dick & Derek at the Movies	Arbors	Duo, with Derek Smith (piano)
1998	1999	There Will Never Be Another You	Jazz Connaisseur	Solo piano; in concert
2001?	2002	Barrel of Keys	Jazz Connaisseur	Duo, with Louis Mazetier (piano); in concert
2001	2002	Forgotten Dreams	Arbors	Duo, with John Sheridan (piano)
2003?	2003	What Is There to Say?	Victrola	Duo, with Ray Kennedy (piano)
2003	2004	If Bix Played Gershwin	Arbors	With Tom Pletcher (cornet), David Sager (trombone), Dan Levinson (clarinet, C-melody sax), Vince Giordano (bass sax), Bob Leary (guitar, banjo, vocals), Ed Metz Jr (drums)
2006?		Playful Virtuosity	Ryko	Duo, with Meral Güneyman (piano)
2006?	2007	Teddy Wilson in 4 Hands	Echoes of Swing	Most tracks duo, with Chris Hopkins (piano); one track each of solo piano
2006?	2006	Solo Piano Variations on the Great Songs of Rodgers & Hammerstein	Jazz Heritage Society	Solo piano
2007		In Concert at the Old Mill Inn	Sackville	Solo piano; in concert
2008	2008	Thinking About Bix	Reference Recordings	Solo piano, with Mike Lipskin (piano) on "You Took Advantage of Me"
2009?	2010	Danzas Tropicales	Ryko	with Meral Güneyman
2010	2012	You're My Everything	Venus	Trio, with Jay Leonhart (bass), Chuck Redd (drums)
2011?	2012	Late Last Summer	Left Ear	Duo, with Judy Hyman (violin)
2013?		Lock My Heart	Red House	Duo, with Heather Masse (vocals)
2012	2013	...Live at the Kitano	Victoria	Duo, with Ken Peplowski (clarinet, tenor sax); in concert
2014	2015	House of Pianos	Arbors	Solo piano; in concert
1992	2022	One Step to Chicago	Rivermont	with Peter Ecklund and Dick Sudhalter (cornet), Jon-Erik Kellso (trumpet), Dan Barrett (trombone), Kenny Davern and Dan Levinson (clarinet), Ken Peplowski (tenor saxophone), Marty Grosz and Howard Alden (banjo/guitar), Vince Giordano (tuba/bass saxophone), Bob Haggart and Milt Hinton (bass), Tony DeNicola and Arnie Kinsella (drums)

=== As sideman ===
With Ruby Braff

- Bugle Call Rag (Jazz Vogue, 1976)
- Fireworks (Inner City, 1985)
- Music from South Pacific (Concord Jazz, 1991)
- Very Sinatra (Red Baron, 1993)
- A Pipe Organ Recital Plus One (Bellaphon, 1996)
- Watch What Happens (Arbors, 2002)
- You Brought a New Kind of Love (Arbors, 2004)

With Jim Cullum Jr.

- New Year's All Star Jam (Pacific Vista, 1993)
- Honky Tonk Train (Riverwalk, 1994)
- Hot Jazz for a Cool Yule (Riverwalk, 1995)
- Fireworks! Red Hot & Blues (Riverwalk, 1996)
- American Love Songs (Riverwalk, 1997)

With Benny Goodman

- Date with the King (Columbia, 1956)
- Benny Goodman (Capitol, 1956)
- Benny Goodman Plays Selections from the Benny Goodman Story (Capitol, 1956)

With Urbie Green

- 21 Trombones (Project 3, 1967)
- 21 Trombones Rock, Blues, Jazz, Volume Two (Project 3, 1969)
- Green Power (Project 3, 1971)
- Bein' Green (Project 3, 1972)
- Oleo (Pausa, 1978)

With Enoch Light

- Show Spectacular (Grand Award, 1959)
- The Original Roaring 20's Volume 4 (Grand Award, 1961)
- Enoch Light and the Glittering Guitars (Project 3, 1969)
- Enoch Light Presents Spaced Out (Project 3, 1969)
- Permissive Polyphonics (Project 3, 1970)

With Wes Montgomery

- Fusion! (Riverside, 1963)
- Pretty Blue (Milestone, 1975)
- The Alternative Wes Montgomery (Milestone, 1982)
- Born to Be Blue (Riverside, 1983)

With Tony Mottola

- Romantic Guitar (Command, 1963)
- Heart & Soul (Project 3, 1966)
- Guitar U.S.A. (Command, 1967)
- Lush, Latin & Lovely (Project 3, 1967)
- Roma Oggi - Rome Today (Project 3, 1968)
- Warm, Wild and Wonderful (Project 3, 1968)
- Tony Mottola's Guitar Factory (Project 3, 1970)
- Tony Mottola and the Quad Guitars (Project 3, 1973)

With Flip Phillips

- Flip Phillips Collates (Clef, 1952)
- A Real Swinger (Concord Jazz, 1988)
- Try a Little Tenderness (Chiaroscuro, 1993)
- Flip Philllips Celebrates His 80th Birthday at the March of Jazz 1995 (Arbors, 2003)

With Doc Severinsen

- Fever (Command, 1966)
- Live! (Command, 1966)
- The New Sound of Today's Big Band (Command, 1967)

With Bob Wilber

- Soprano Summit (World Jazz, 1974)
- Summit Reunion (Chiaroscuro, 1990)
- Bufadora Blow-up (Arbors, 1997)
- A Perfect Match (Arbors, 1998)
- Everywhere You Go There's Jazz (Arbors, 1999)
- A Tribute to Kenny Davern and 80th Birthday Salute to Bob Wilber (2009)

With others

- Howard Alden, Howard Alden Plays the Music of Harry Reser (Stomp Off, 1989)
- Louis Bellson and Gene Krupa, The Mighty Two (Roulette, 1963)
- Ruth Brown, Miss Rhythm (Atlantic, 1959)
- Evan Christopher, Delta Bound (Arbors, 2007)
- Don Elliott and Rusty Dedrick, Counterpoint for Six Valves (Riverside, 1959)
- Major Holley and Slam Stewart, Shut Yo' Mouth! (PM, 1987)
- J. J. Johnson, Goodies (RCA Victor, 1965)
- Mundell Lowe, The Mundell Lowe Quartet (Riverside, 1955)
- Mark Murphy, That's How I Love the Blues! (Riverside, 1963) – recorded in 1962
- Bette Midler, Songs for the New Depression (Atlantic, 1976) – recorded in 1972–76
- Sandy Stewart, Sandy Stewart Sings the Songs of Jerome Kern with Dick Hyman at the Piano (Audiophile, 1995) – recorded in 1994
- Toots Thielemans, The Whistler and His Guitar (Metronome, 1962)

=== As arranger ===
With Count Basie

- The Board of Directors (Dot, 1967) with The Mills Brothers
- How About This (Paramount, 1968) with Kay Starr

With Trigger Alpert

- Trigger Happy! (Riverside, 1956)

With Flip Phillips

- Try a Little Tenderness (Chiaroscuro, 1993)
