= Forgotten Dreams =

Studio album by Dick Hyman and John Sheridan
- Released: January 28, 2002
- Recorded: January 19, 2001
- Genre: Jazz
- Length: 61:04
- Label: Arbors; ARCD 19248
- Producer: Dick Hyman and John Sheridan

Dick Hyman chronology
Dick & Derek at the Movies (1998)	Forgotten Dreams (2002)	What Is There to Say? (2003)

Forgotten Dreams, subtitled Archives of Novelty Piano (1920s–1930s) is an album featuring recordings of novelty piano tunes by pianists Dick Hyman and John Sheridan which was released on the Arbors label.

== Reception ==
Professional ratings
Review scores
Source	Rating
Allmusic	4/5 stars
Penguin Guide to Jazz	4/4 stars

Allmusic's Ken Dryden noted "Relatively few (if any) pianists have tackled these tricky pieces in a duo setting, though Hyman and his protégé Sheridan complement one another's playing extremely well throughout the date. They add their own personal touches to these tunes, while keeping them from wandering too far from their roots. Primarily of interest to fans of stride, classic jazz, and early swing, this memorable release should still appeal to all fans of jazz piano". All About Jazz said "All 19 cuts on this collection of hauntingly beautiful pieces is masterfully performed by the two men Sheridan and Hyman. Both men, performing on identical pianos for this recording, have shown that their 15+ years playing together has really created a unified flow to what they do. There are times when the two pianos are panned separately into the speakers, so that one can distinguish the parts being play. There are times, particularly in "Finger Buster" when the two parts—though panned—are indistinguishable in a collision of sonic fury". The Penguin Guide to Jazz selected this album as part of its suggested Core Collection.

== Track listing ==
1. "Echoes of Spring" (Willie "The Lion" Smith) - 3:49
2. "Concentratin'" (Smith) - 2:54
3. "Morning Air" (Smith) - 2:53
4. "Finger Buster" (Smith) - 2:55
5. "In the Dark" (Bix Beiderbecke) - 3:09
6. "Soliloquy" (Rube Bloom) - 3:47
7. "Spring Fever" (Bloom) - 4:14
8. "Southern Charms" (Bloom) - 3:12
9. "Aunt Jemima's Birthday" (Bloom) - 2:54
10. "Dancing Tambourine" (William Conrad Polla) - 3:20
11. "Midsummer's Nightmare" (Zez Confrey) - 3:46
12. "Nickel in the Slot" (Confrey) - 2:27
13. "Grandfather's Clock" (Confrey) - 3:59
14. "My Pet" (Confrey) - 2:55
15. "Lace Embroidery" (Bob Zurke) - 2:17
16. "Southern Exposure" (Zurke) - 4:06
17. "Hobson Street Blues" (Zurke) - 2:39
18. "Eye Opener" (Zurke) - 2:43
19. "Adirondack Sketches - The Legend Of Lonesome Lake (Eastwood Lane) - 3:05

== Personnel ==
- Dick Hyman and John Sheridan - piano
