= Adam Charlap Hyman =

American designer, artist, and architect

- Born: October 20, 1989 (age 37)
- Education: Rhode Island School of Design
- Website: www.ch-herrero.com

Adam Charlap Hyman (born 1989) is an American designer and artist. He is the co-founder and partner of Charlap Hyman & Herrero, an architecture and design firm based out of New York City and Los Angeles. Dick Hyman is his grandfather.

== Education ==
Hyman graduated from the Rhode Island School of Design (RISD) in 2011 with a BFA in Furniture Design and Art History.

== Career ==
From 2010 to 2011, Charlap Hyman worked for the Rhode Island School of Design Museum, where he worked as a Conservation Assistant and a Curatorial Assistant. In September 2011, he worked for Polo Ralph Lauren as a Furniture Design Consultant. In his 4 years at Ralph Lauren Home, Charlap Hyman collected, researched, and archived historical reference material.

In October 2014, Charlap Hyman and his RISD classmate Andre Herrero co-founded Charlap Hyman & Herrero. Charlap Hyman runs the office in New York City, while Herrero runs the office in Los Angeles. Charlap Hyman & Herrero works internationally for a range of clients and industries, producing architecture, interior design, product design, furniture design, and art. Adam's brother, Alexander, works for the company running the business side of the operation.

Adam Charlap Hyman was listed in the 'Art & Style' Forbes 30 Under 30 list in 2018. Every year from 2021 through 2024, Charlap Hyman & Herrero has been listed as one of Architectural Digest's top 100 most talented architecture and design firms.
