= Joe Ascione =

American drummer

- Born: March 14, 1961; Brooklyn, New York
- Died: March 11, 2016 (aged 54)
- Genres: Jazz
- Occupation: Musician
- Instrument: Drums
- Years active: 1973–2006
- Label: Arbors

Joe Ascione (March 14, 1961 – March 11, 2016) was an American jazz drummer.

Ascione grew up in Brooklyn, New York. He began playing drums at age 2. His parents bought him his first drum set at age 4, and he was playing professionally by the time he was 12. When he was a teenager, he was a roadie for Buddy Rich. He cites Rich, Gene Krupa, and Philly Joe Jones as drummers who held his attention longer than the pop music drummers he heard as a kid.

Although he was a jazz drummer, he didn't like being limited to that category. He performed, recorded or toured with musicians from jazz, rock, and pop music, including Cab Calloway, Donald Fagen, Della Reese, David Grisman, George Coleman, Billy Mitchell, Flip Phillips, Al Hirt, Dr. John, Phoebe Snow, Jon Hendricks, Dick Hyman, Joey DeFrancesco, Frank Vignola, and Herb Ellis.

In 2000, Ascione was diagnosed with multiple sclerosis. He died on March 11, 2016, at the age of 54.

== Discography ==
- My Buddy – A Tribute to Buddy Rich (Nagel-Heyer, 1997)
- Post No Bills (Arbors, 1998)
- Movin' Up (Arbors, 2008)
