= John Sheridan (pianist) =

American jazz pianist and arranger (1946–2021)

- Born: January 20, 1946; Columbus, Ohio, United States
- Died: August 24, 2021 (aged 75)
- Genres: Jazz
- Occupations: Musician; Arranger
- Instrument: Piano
- Label: Arbors
- Formerly of: Jim Cullum Jazz Band

John Sheridan (January 20, 1946 – August 24, 2021) was an American jazz pianist and arranger born in Columbus, Ohio, perhaps best known for his work with the Jim Cullum Jazz Band.

== Biography ==
John showed interest in piano at an early age, i.e. three or four, and regularly watched and enjoyed a pianist on television in Columbus. Later he enjoyed watching Peter Nero, Victor Borge, and Liberace

He studied piano with Mrs. McCullagh for about five years, 1958 – 1963. Later he studied under Mr. Les Susi at Whetstone High School where he played in Whetstone High School orchestra and Jazz Band, and performed as a clarinetist in the marching band 1964 – 1969

During summers he worked as a rehearsal pianist for Kenley Players of Warren, Ohio when they performed in Columbus. There he met many well known celebrates.

He frequently enjoyed watching Billy Maxted with his parents, John Willard Sheridan and Katherine Timm Sheridan, when he performed in Columbus.

He graduated from Capital University in Bexley, Ohio where he studied music focusing on jazz. After college he joined the Navy, and played in the Navy Band. There he played aboard the Presidential Yacht, and met many dignitaries, including Sen. Everett Dirksen.

In 1977, Sheridan received a Master of Music degree from the North Texas State University, and two years later joined the Jim Cullum Jazz Band as an arranger and performer. In 2002, Sheridan left the band and did freelance work, also recording for the Arbors Records jazz record label. In 2011, he returned to the Jim Cullum Jazz Band.

== Discography ==
- Two Sleepy People with Dan Barrett (Arbors, 1996)
- Something Tells Me (Arbors, 1997)
- They Can't Take That Away from Me (Arbors, 1999)
- Forgotten Dreams with Dick Hyman (Arbors, 2002)
- Around the World with Jeff Barnhart and John Sheridan (Summit World Jazz, 2003)
- Artistry3 (Arbors, 2004)
- Embraceable You with John Cocuzzi (Arizona Cactus World Jazz, 2006)

=== As sideman ===
With Jim Cullum Jr.

- Tis the Season... To Be Jammin'! (World Jazz, 1984)
- Super Satch (Stomp Off, 1987)
- New Year's All Star Jam (Pacific Vista, 1993)
- Battle of the Bands (Pacific Vista, 1994)
- Honky Tonk Train (Riverwalk, Live from the Landing, 1994)
- Hot Jazz for a Cool Yule (Riverwalk, Live from the Landing, 1995)
- Fireworks! Red Hot & Blues (Riverwalk, Live from the Landing, 1996)
- American Love Songs (Riverwalk, Live from the Landing, 1997)
- Chasin' the Blues (Riverwalk, Live from the Landing, 2005)

With others

- John Allred, Head to Head (Arbors, 2002)
- Bob Barnard, Cornet Copia (La Brava Music 2000)
- Dan Barrett, Being a Bear: Jazz for the Whole Family (Arbors, 2000)
- Evan Christopher, This Side of Evan (Jazzology, 2002)
- John Cocuzzi, Groove Merchant (Arbors, 2011)
- Wild Bill Davison, The Memphis Jazz Festival 1982 Volume Four (Jazzology, 1983)
- Chuck Hedges, Allan Vache, Clarinet Climax (Jazzology, 1983)
- Allan Vache, Jazz Moods (Audiophile, 1983)
- Allan Vache, High Speed Swing (Audiophile, 1985)
