= Paris Washboard =

French jazz group

Paris Washboard is a French jazz group devoted to Dixieland jazz revival.

Paris Washboard was founded in 1988 by two former members of Gilbert Leroux's Washboard Group, Alain Marquet (clarinet) and Daniel Barda (trombone). Marquet was asked to record for Stomp Off Records and got Marquet, Leroux, and pianist Louis Mazetier to play on his initial recordings, all under the name Paris Washboard. They proved to be a popular attraction and decided to continue recording and performing together, touring Europe and Australia (though Gerard Bagot took Leroux's place on tours). They first played the United States for the Great Connecticut Traditional Jazz Festival in 1993, and Gerard Gervois (tuba) joined the group that same year.

== Discography ==
- Waiting for the Sunrise (Stomp Off, 1992)
- California Here We Come (Stomp Off, 1993)
- Truckin' (Stomp Off, 1995)
- Love Nest (Stomp Off, 1996)
- Love For Sale (Stomp Off, 1996)
- Super (Jazzophile, 2000)
- Wild Cat Blues (Stomp Off, 2001)
- Caravan (Stomp Off, 2001)
- Fifteen Fresh Years (Stomp Off, 2005)
- One More Time (Stomp Off, 2006)
