= Joseph C. Hyman =

American lawyer

Joseph Charlap Hyman (1889 – February 10, 1949) was an American attorney, social worker, and philanthropist. He was born in New York, to Abraham Chaim Charlap, a member of the Sephardic rabbinical dynasty of Gedaliah ibn Yahya ben Joseph and a noted author and publisher of Hebrew texts and their English translations.

Through his work with Herbert H. Lehman, he became involved with the Joint Distribution Committee, the largest and most encompassing of the organizations devoted to the Jewish refugee and rescue crisis during and after World War II, and was its vice chairman under Felix M. Warburg from 1922 until his retirement in December 1946. Under his leadership, the Joint Distribution Committee helped 81,000 Jews to emigrate out of Nazi-occupied Europe to safety, smuggled aid to Jewish prisoners in labor camps, and provided financing for the Polish Jewish underground in preparations for the 1943 Warsaw Ghetto revolt. He was a key figure in keeping American Jewish leaders informed about the Holocaust and met with Secretary of the Treasury Henry Morgenthau Jr. and Secretary of State Cordell Hull to request visas for the 907 refugees aboard the MS St. Louis on June 1, 1939, which was unsuccessful. The events of the MS St. Louis tragedy are recorded in the 1976 film Voyage of the Damned.

Apart from his activities within the JDC, he served as adviser to the League of Nations High Commissioner on Refugees, James G. McDonald, and was assistant to Felix M. Warburg as chairman of the administrative committee of the Jewish Agency for Palestine.

His son is renowned pianist Richard "Dick" Hyman.
