= Chuck Hedges =

American jazz clarinetist

- Birth name: Charles Hedges
- Born: July 21, 1932; Chicago, Illinois, U.S.
- Died: June 24, 2010 (aged 77); Waukesha, Wisconsin, U.S.
- Genres: Jazz
- Instruments: Clarinet

Charles "Chuck" A. Hedges (July 21, 1932 – June 24, 2010) was an American jazz clarinetist.

== Early life and education ==
Hedges was born in Chicago. He began playing clarinet while attending a military school. He received formal training under Claude Bordy and learned to play jazz on his own. He attended Northwestern University.

== Career ==
Hedges joined George Brunis's ensemble in 1953, remaining with Brunis through the end of the decade. He was active on the Dixieland revival scene in the 1960s, playing regularly at clubs in Chicago and Milwaukee into the 1990s. He worked with Wild Bill Davison for most of the 1980s and also worked with Alan Vaché and Johnny Varro. He released several albums as a leader in the 1990s and 2000s.

== Personal life ==
Hedges died in Waukesha, Wisconsin, in 2010. Hedges had six children.

== Discography ==
- Bob Hirsch, Tommy Saunders, Chuck Hedges, Sid Dawson, Chuck Anderson, Steve Thede: Bob Hirsch and His Jazz All-Stars at briarcombe: A Jazz Picnic (1976)
- Chuck Hedges, Johnny Varro, Ray Leatherwood, Gene Estes: The Square Roots of Jazz (1984)
- No Greater Love (Arbors, 1992), with Eddie Higgins, Bob Haggart, Gene Estes
- Live at Andy's (Delmark, 1993), with Duane Thamm, John Bany, Dave Baney, Charles Braugham
- Chuck Hedges and Allan Vaché: Clarinet Climax (Jazzology Records, 1998), with Howard Elkins, Jack Wyatt, Jim Vaughn, John Sheridan
- Just Jammin': Chuck Hedges and the Milwaukee Connection (Arbors, 2001), with Henry "Bucky" Buckwalter, Gary Meisner, Dave Sullivan, Mike Britz, Andy LoDuca
- Chuck Hedges and Duane Thamm: Tribute to Hamp (Delmark, 2002), with Frank Dawson, John Bany, Charlie Braugham
