= Uptown Lowdown Jazz Band =

The Uptown Lowdown Jazz Band was an American Dixieland jazz band from the Bellevue, Washington area, active for forty-seven years, from 1971 until 2018. It was founded and led by cornetist Bert Barr (1945–2019).

== History ==
Barr was born in 1945 in Vallejo, California. As a teenager he was inspired by Turk Murphy and the Firehouse Five Plus Two, learning the solos from his uncle's record collection. Barr began attending shows by Murphy at his San Francisco traditional jazz club, Earthquake McGoon's, and later formed a band in high school which played a few local events, including a standing Saturday gig at Red's Pizza in Vallejo.

Barr matriculated to the University of Oregon where he formed The Emerald City Jazz Band with other students. Drafted into the Army, he was stationed at Fort Lewis before shipping off to Vietnam, where he formed another band with fellow soldiers called The Hot Rats of Saigon. After his service he returned to Eugene, where he finished his degree at the U.of O., before moving to Seattle.

In 1971 he formed his first Uptown Lowdown Jazzband, naming it after a tune by Isham Jones. The band (with changeable personnel) performed continuously from 1971 to 2018, with Barr being the only constant member. At their peak in the 1990s they appeared at over 28 festivals annually throughout the United States and abroad, including the Old Sacramento Dixieland Jazz Jubilee, Sun Valley Swing & Dixie, The Great Connecticut Jazz Festival, San Diego Jazz Festival, Pismo Beach Jazz and America's Festival in Lacey, Washington, held over the 4th of July weekend. The full seven-piece band has a worldwide reputation having performed in Japan, Holland, Belgium, Germany, Mexico, and Canada. An 'Uptown Lowdown Lite' quartet, consisting of members of the big band, also does commissioned performances. Barr also performed as The Double Barrs, a duo with his piano-playing wife, Rose Marie Barr.

The band has released at least thirty-four albums.

== Partial discography ==
- 1976 Uptown Lowdown Jazzband - Volume One (Uptown Lowdown Jazz UL-101)
- 1977 Uptown Lowdown Jazzband - Volume Two (Uptown Lowdown Jazz UL-202)
- 1978 Uptown Lowdown Jazzband - Volume 3 (Uptown Lowdown Jazz UL-303)
- 1980 Uptown Lowdown Jazzband (G.H.B. Records GHB-149)
- 1981 Hauling Ash (G.H.B. Records GHB-159)
- 1982 Uptown Lowdown Jazz Band in Colonial York, Pa (Stomp Off Records SOS-1030)
- 1982 Live in Japan at the Kobe Jazz Festival (Hanshin Live Recording Company HLR-5253)
- 1985 Your Requests
- 1986 Seattle Style (Ber-Dan Jazz Enterprises BDR-1)
- 1986 Jingle Jazz (Ber-Dan Jazz Enterprises BDR-2)
- 1986 Live in Tokyo 1986
- 1987 Road Apple Rag (Yerba Buena Jazz YBJ-101)
- 1988 Saloon (Yerba Buena Jazz YBJ-102)
- 1990 Live at Oak Harbor (with King Cresol Jazz Band, Dan Jazz Enterprises KBDJ-C1)
- 1991 Seattle Style II: Business in F (Dan Jazz Enterprises)
- 1993 21st Birthday: 1972-1993 (Ber-Dan Jazz Enterprises BDJ-CD5)
- 1996 Cookin' with the Uptown Lowdown Jazz Band, Volume I (Ber-Dan Jazz Enterprises BDJ-CD6)
- 1996 Cookin' with the Uptown Lowdown Jazz Band, Volume II (Ber-Dan Jazz Enterprises BDJ-CD7)
- 1997 Apostles of Sax (Uptown Lowdown Jazz UPLOJZ-1)
- 1998 Apostles of Sax: Sax Religious (Uptown Lowdown Jazz)
- 2000 Borneo & Other Vintage Rarities (Uptown Lowdown Jazz UL-105)
- 2001 At The Storybrook Ball (Uptown Lowdown Jazz)
- 2002 Apostles of Sax: 30th Anniversary (Uptown Lowdown Jazz)
- 2002 I Wish't I Was In Peoria (Uptown Lowdown Jazz)
- 2007 The Chattanooga Stomp (Uptown Lowdown Jazz)
- 2010 Hangin' In There: 30 Years
- 2012 Well Seasoned
- Play It Again!
- Seattle - Frisco Connection
- Tribute to Fletcher Henderson (with Evergreen Classic Band)
- Memories of You
- Uptown Lowdown Lite
- Cruisin' Avalon
