= Tatiana Eva-Marie =

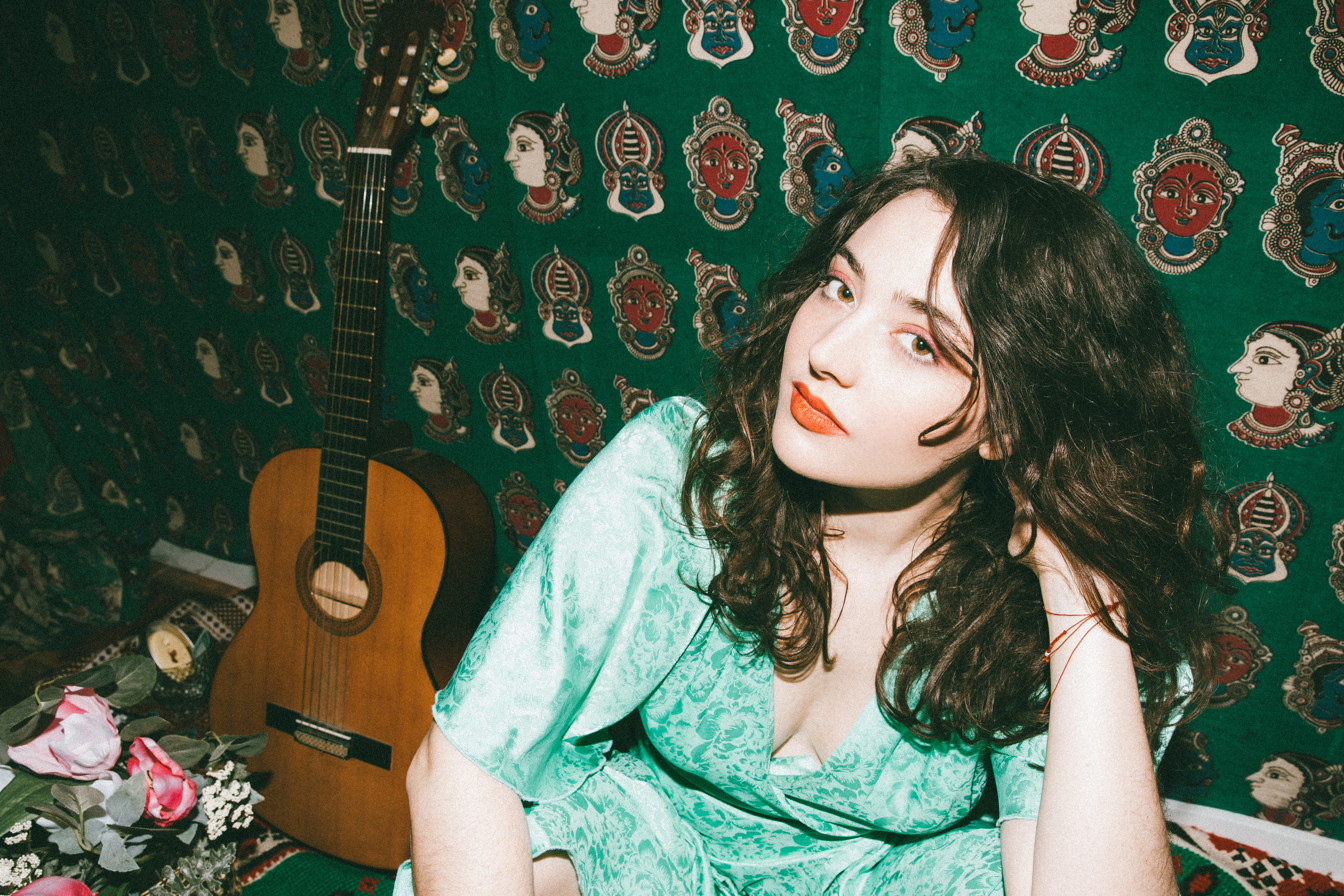
- Eva-Marie in 2022

Background information
- Born: 29 December 1989 (age 36); Neuchâtel, Switzerland
- Genres: Jazz, French pop, Gypsy Jazz
- Occupation: Singer
- Instrument: Vocals
- Website: www.tatianaevamarie.com

Tatiana Eva-Marie (born 29 December 1989) is a Swiss singer. She was born in Switzerland into a family of artists. Her father is Swiss-French and her mother is Romanian. She is known for founding the Avalon Jazz Band, singing jazz and French pop derived from the Django Reinhardt tradition. Her singing has been compared to jazz vocalists Cyrille Aimée and Cécile McLorin Salvant. Her band opened for vocalist and pianist Norah Jones.

== Biography ==
She is the daughter of composer Louis Crelier and violinist Anca Maria, and she grew up in France and Switzerland. She later moved to New York and founded the Avalon Jazz Band.

In 2024, she wrote the libretto for an opera, "Eden Park", music by Swiss composer Gérard Massini. The libretto is inspired by the true story of George Remus.

For her album "Djangology", she wrote lyrics to the music of Django Reinhardt and reimagined his compositions in her own way. Her album was released on 7 June 2024 by GroundUp Music.

== Discography ==
- Je suis Swing (2016)
- Paris (2019)
- Wintertime Dreams (Burton Avenue, 2019)
- Bonjour Tristesse with Michael Valeanu (2020)
- April in Paris (Burton Avenue, 2021)
- We'll Meet Again (2021)
- I Double Dare You with Terry Waldo (Turtle Bay, 2021)
- The Sound of Love: Tribute to Michel Legrand with Giovanni Mirabassi (Venus Jazz Japan, 2022)
- Two at the Most with Jeremy Corren (Turtle Bay, 2023)
- Djangology (GroundUP Music, 2024)
