= Evan Christopher =

American jazz clarinetist and composer (born 1969)

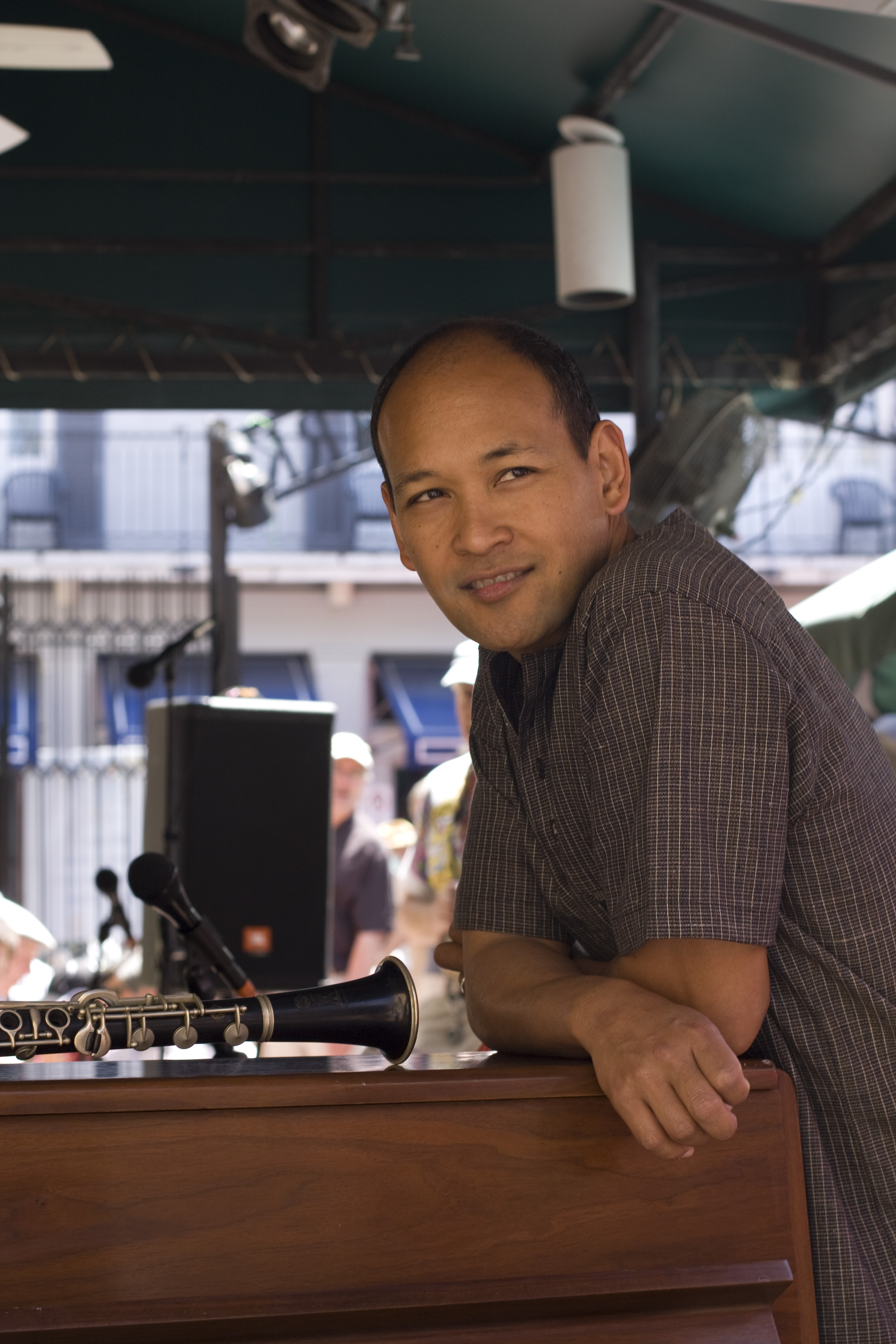
- Christopher in 2010

Background information
- Born: August 31, 1969 (age 56); Long Beach, California, U.S.
- Genres: Jazz, world music
- Occupation: Musician
- Instrument: Clarinet
- Labels: Arbors, STR Digital, Frémeaux & Associés

Evan Christopher (born August 31, 1969) is an American jazz clarinetist and composer.

== Biography ==
=== Background ===
His first musical training was at the Idyllwild School of Music and the Arts. After high school, he studied saxophone at the University of Southern California and graduated from California State University at Long Beach, where he studied clarinet. Early mentors include clarinetists Kenny Davern, Tony Scott and soprano saxophonist George Probert.

=== Career ===
Tours with singer-songwriter A. J. Croce in the early 1990s brought Christopher to New Orleans. He moved to Crescent City in 1994 and enjoyed varied work before leaving to join the Jim Cullum Jazz Band in San Antonio, Texas in 1996. For nearly three years, he appeared nightly as their featured clarinetist and recorded episodes of the syndicated radio program Riverwalk Jazz. He returned to New Orleans but was forced to leave in 2005 when the federal levees failed because of Hurricane Katrina. He traveled continuously and lived briefly in Paris at the invitation of the city of Paris. During this residency, he formed the Jazz Traditions Project and Django à la Créole. The latter fused Gypsy jazz with New Orleans grooves. Tours with Irvin Mayfield's New Orleans Jazz Orchestra made it possible for Christopher to return to New Orleans. He is a charter member of jazz composer guild, NOLA ArtHouse Music, and the Seahawk Modern Jazz Orchestra in southern California.

Christopher published research on the New Orleans style of clarinet. In 2002 he began pursuing a degree in musicology at Tulane University. From 2008 to 2009, he taught part-time at the University of New Orleans and taught an ensemble that performed with Lucien Barbarin and Marcus Roberts. In July 2010, he debuted the "Treat It Gentle Suite", a concerto for clarinet and jazz band with the Minnesota Orchestra.

== Discography ==
=== As leader ===
- This Side of Evan (Meridien, 1998)
- New Orleans Rendezvous (G.H.B., 1999)
- Danza with Tom McDermott (STR 2002)
- Clarinet Road Vol. I: The Road to New Orleans (STR, 2003)
- Clarinet Road Vol. II: The Road to New Orleans (STR, 2005)
- Introduction: Live at the Meridien (ClassicJazz, 2007)
- Delta Bound (Arbors, 2007)
- Django a la Creole (Fremeaux, 2008)
- The Remembering Song (Arbors, 2010)
- Django a la Creole: Live! (Fremeaux, 2014)
- Clarinet Road Vol. III: In Sidney's Footsteps (STR, 2016)

=== As sideman ===
- A. J. Croce, A.J. Croce (Private Music, 1993)
- Jim Cullum, American Love Songs (Riverwalk, 1997)
- Jim Cullum, Chasin' the Blues (Riverwalk, 2005)
- Lars Edegran, Lars Edegran and His New Orleans All Stars (G.H.B., 2000)
- Lars Edegran, Triolian String Band (G.H.B., 2011)
- Lionel Ferbos, Lionel Ferbos with Lars Edegran's New Orleans Band (G.H.B., 1995)
- Mark Isham, Romeo Is Bleeding (Verve, 1994)
- Tom McDermott, Bamboula (Minky 2013)
- Irvin Mayfield, Book One (World Village, 2009)
- Arnold McCuller, Exception to the Rule (Coyote, 1994)
- Trevor Richards, City of the Blues (Jazzology, 1999)
- Trevor Richards, 35 Years 1965–2000 Blame It On the Blues! (New Orleans Jazz, 2000)
- Terry Waldo, Presents the Jazz Entertainers Vol. 1 Let It Shine (Stomp Off, 2003)
