= Lars Erstrand =

Swedish vibraphonist

Lars Erstrand (27 September 1936 – 11 March 2009) was a Swedish vibraphonist.

== Career ==
Erstrand was born in Uppsala, Sweden. He began his musical life on piano, but after hearing Lionel Hampton he changed to vibraphone. During the 1960s he joined a band led by clarinetist Ove Lind in the swing style of Benny Goodman. The band played at the Stampen club (The Pawn Shop) in Stockholm. Erstrand also worked in the Swedish Swing Society with Antti Sarpila. He performed with Goodman and other American musicians who passed through Sweden. He was one of the musicians responsible for Jazz at the Pawnshop in 1977. In 1991 he recorded Two Generations with Lionel Hampton. Other musicians Erstrand has played with include Alice Babs, Svend Asmussen, Arne Domnérus, Bob Wilber, and Scott Hamilton.

== Discography ==
- I Want to Be Happy (Columbia, 1971)
- One Morning in May, Ove Lind Quartet (Phontastic, 1975)
- Summer Night, Ove Lind (Phontastic, 1976)
- Jazz at the Pawnshop, med Domnérus/Hallberg (Proprius, 1976)
- Evergreens, Vol. 1, Ove Lind kvartett/sextett (Phontastic, 1977)
- Vital Wilber & Lilting Lind, Bob Wilber/Ove Lind (Phontastic, 1977)
- Evergreens, Vol. 2, Ove Lind kvintett/sextett (Phontastic, 1978)
- In the Mood for Swing, Bob Wilber American All Stars (Phontastic, 1980)
- Two Sides of Lars Erstrand (Opus 3, 1983)
- We'll Meet Again, Erstrand-Ove Lind Quartet (Phontastic, 1983)
- Lars Erstrand and Four Brothers (Opus 3, 1984)
- A Tribute to the Benny Goodman Quartet , Erstrand-Ove Lind Quartet (Opus 3, 1986)
- Live at Salsta Café, Swedish Swing Quartet (Phontastic, 1988)
- Stompin' and Flyin', Swedish Swing Quartet (Phontastic, 1989)
- Good Vibes at the Pawnshop Jazz Club with Arne Domnerus (Proprius, 1991)
- Dream Dancing (Opus 3, 1991)
- Two Generations, med Lionel Hampton (Phontastic, 1991)
- Beautiful Friendship, first and second set (Sittel, 1992)
- Ev'rything is Fine, med Wobbling Woodwinds träblås (Phontastic, 1994)
- Live is Life, med Arne Domnérus (Proprius, 1995)
- The Lars Erstrand Sessions (Opus 3, 1996)
- International All Stars Live at Uttersberg 1998 (Gemini, 1999)
- 'S Wonderful, Lars Erstrand Four (Sittel, 2000)
- Encore, Lars Erstrand Four (Sittel, 2001)
- Louis Goes to Church, Swedish Swing Society (Sittel, 2001)
- Lars Erstrand at Gallery Astley, Vol. 1 (Gemini, 2002)
- Jazz Delights (Opus3, 2003)
- Meets Rebecca Kilgore (Gemini, 2003)
- Live in Japan – Kobe Jazz Street 2001 (Prophone, 2004)
- Jazz on the Platform, Lars Erstrand & Antti Sarpila Quintet (Prophone, 2005)
