= Warren Vaché Sr. =

American jazz musician

Warren W. Vaché Sr. (27 November 1914, in Brooklyn, New York – 4 February 2005, in Rahway, New Jersey) was an American jazz musician and journalist. He was the father of jazz trumpet player Warren Vaché Jr. and clarinet player Allan Vache.

Vaché began as a drummer, but quickly realized that there was a greater demand for jazz bassists, and established himself on the double bass. He played with Eddie Condon at New York's Nick's club, appeared regularly with Doc Cheatham, also featured with Bobby Hackett and Vic Dickenson, and directed his own Dixieland Jazz bands such as The Syncopatin' Six and The Syncopatin' Seven, recording two albums for the Jazzology label.

Vaché Sr. was one of the founders of the American Jazz Hall of Fame. He also founded the New Jersey Jazz Society and the American Federation of Jazz Societies. He wrote for 15 years as editor of the magazine Jersey Jazz. He also wrote biographies of jazz musicians such as Pee Wee Erwin, Johnny Blowers and Claude Hopkins ("Crazy Fingers") and edited the collections The Unsung Songwriters and Jazz Gentry, which consisted of articles on jazz musician and jazz.

A resident of Rahway, New Jersey, he and his wife Madeline had a daughter and two sons, both professional jazz musicians, trumpeter Warren Vaché Jr. and clarinetist Allan Vaché.
