= Stomp Off =

Stomp Off Records
- Founded: 1980
- Founder: Bob Erdos
- Genre: Jazz, ragtime
- Country of origin: U.S.
- Location: York, Pennsylvania
- Official website: www.stompoffrecords.com

Stomp Off is an American jazz record company and label founded in 1980 by Bob Erdos in York, Pennsylvania. The label's first release was Feelin' Devilish by Waldo's Gutbucket Serenaders.

It was described in 1986 as concentrating on "jazz in the styles of the 1920s or earlier, as played by contemporary musicians." Up to then, the recordings were released on LP only. The roster soon covered musicians from the US, Europe, and Japan.

Erdos died on March 25, 2017. By that time, the label had released more than 430 albums, 80 of which were available by digital download.

== Roster ==
- Howard Alden
- Clint Baker
- Aces of Syncopation
- Acker Bilk
- Black Bottom Stompers
- Black Eagle Jazz Band
- Jean-Francois Bonnel
- Tom Brier
- Ernie Carson
- European Classic Jazz Band
- Charquet & Co.
- Chrysanthemum Ragtime Band
- Ken Colyer
- Jim Cullum, Jr./Jim Cullum Jazz Band
- Dave Dallwitz
- Mike Daniels
- James Dapogny
- Ted des Plantes
- Neville Dickie
- Down Home Jazz Band
- Dry Throat Five
- Peter Ecklund
- Wally Fawkes
- George Foley
- Jacques Gauthe
- Banu Gibson
- John Gill
- Grand Dominion Jazz Band
- Marty Grosz
- Hall Brothers Jazz Band
- Heliotrope Ragtime Orchestra
- Art Hodes
- Hot Antic Jazz Band
- Keith Ingham
- Jazz O'Maniacs
- Kustbandet
- Morten Gunnar Larsen
- Carol Leigh
- Louisiana Repertory Jazz Ensemble
- Louisiana Washboard Five
- Humphrey Lyttelton
- Louis Mazetier
- Jimmy Mazzy
- Rosy McHargue
- Turk Murphy
- Don Neely
- New Orleans Ragtime Orchestra
- New Orleans Rascals
- Keith Nichols
- Jimmie Noone Jr.
- Ophelia Ragtime Orchestra
- The Original Salty Dogs Jazz Band
- Paris Washboard
- Bent Persson
- Red Roseland Cornpickers
- Michael Lande's Rhythm Club Orchestra
- Wally Rose
- Scaniazz
- Ray Skjelbred
- Hal Smith
- Ray Smith
- South Frisco Jazz Band
- Andy Stein
- Tom Stuip
- Richard Sudhalter
- Monty Sunshine
- Swedish Jazz Kings
- Butch Thompson
- Uptown Lowdown Jazz Band
- Terry Waldo
- West End Jazz Band
- Golden Eagle Jazz Band-USA
- Gaslight Gale Foehner
- The St. Louis Ragtimers
