= Terry Waldo =

American pianist and composer (born 1944)

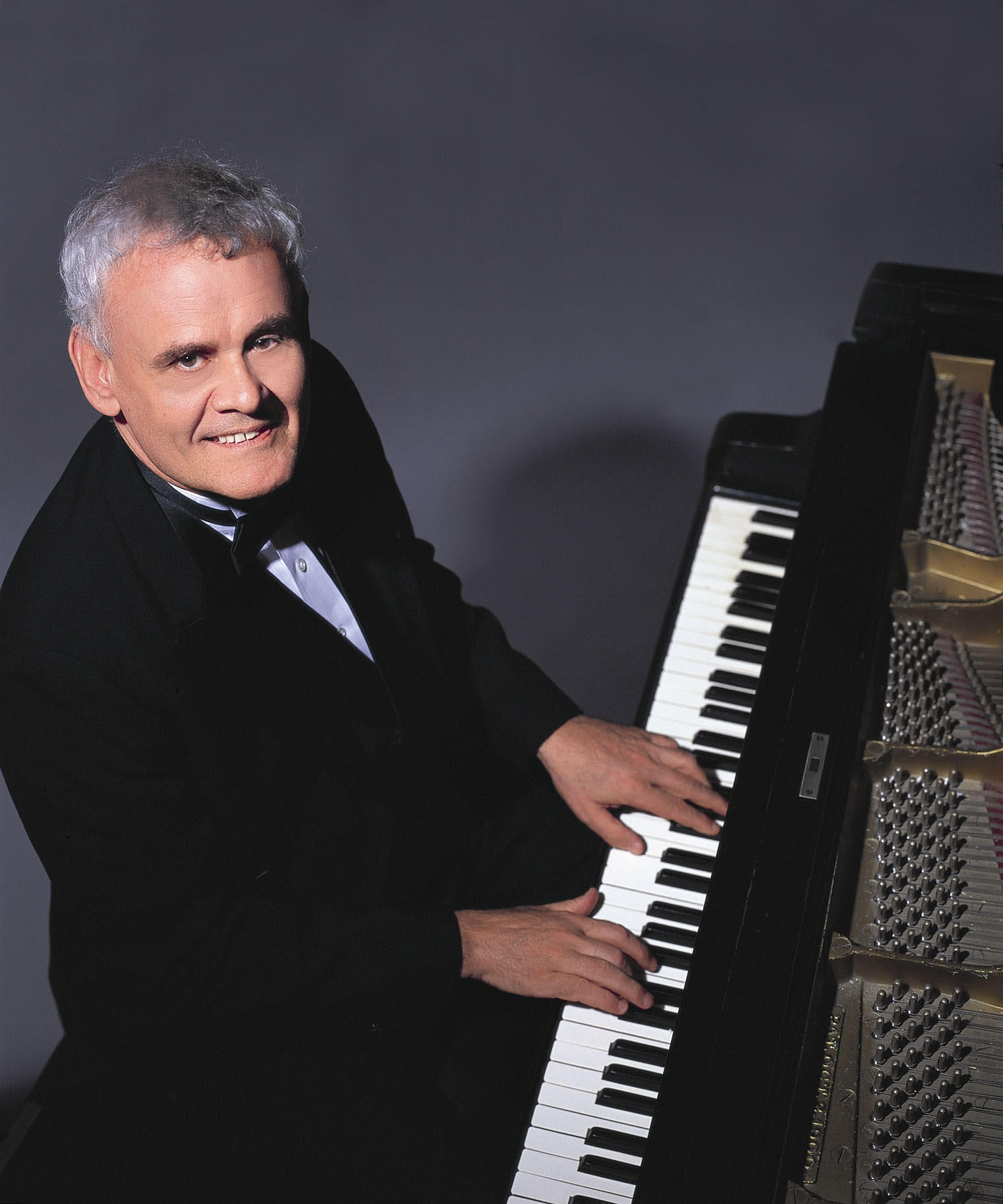

Background information
- Born: November 26, 1944 (age 81); Ironton, Ohio, U.S.
- Origin: New York City
- Genres: Ragtime, jazz
- Occupations: Musician, composer
- Instrument: Piano
- Years active: 1963–present
- Labels: Delmark, Stomp Off, Waldo/Lee Music, Metronome, Musical Heritage Society, Tompkins Square
- Website: www.terrywaldo.com

Terry Waldo (born November 26, 1944) is an American pianist, composer, and historian of early jazz, blues, and stride music, and is best known for his contribution to ragtime and his role in reviving interest in this form, starting in the 1970s. Says Wynton Marsalis in his introduction to Waldo's book: "He teaches Ragtime, he talks about Ragtime, he plays it, he embodies it, he lives it, and he keeps Ragtime alive." The book, This is Ragtime, published in 1976, grew out of the series of the same title that Waldo produced for NPR in 1974. Waldo is also a theatrical music director, producer, vocalist, and teacher. He is noted for his wit and humor in performance, as "a monologist in the dry, Middle Western tradition." Eubie Blake describes his first impression of Waldo's performance thus: "I died laughing...that's one of the hardest things to do—make people laugh. Terry's ability to do this, combined with his musicianship, actually reminds me of Fats Waller."

== Early life ==
Waldo was born in Ironton, Ohio. His family moved to Columbus, Ohio when he was about five years old. His neighbor, John Baker, owned a large collection of jazz recordings, piano rolls, and jazz films. Terry spent most of his free time absorbing all this great American music at Baker's. The jazz film collection was eventually acquired by the American Jazz Museum in Kansas City, Missouri, and is considered one of the most extensive in the world. As a child, Waldo listened to Spike Jones and Dixieland records, and became a record collector himself.

At around the age of eight he began studying classical piano. The formal lessons continued for three years; in a short time he moved from classical to jazz and ragtime. He also learned how to play trumpet, tuba, string bass, cello, tympani drums, banjo, and organ.

By 1961, he had organized his first band: The Fungus Five Plus Two ("our music grows on you"), which appeared on Ted Mack's Original Amateur Hour in 1963, the same year Waldo graduated from high school. In 1969 Waldo met Eubie Blake at the St. Louis Ragtime Festival. Blake became his mentor and lifelong friend. Waldo studied piano with Blake from 1971 through 1983, although Blake qualifies their arrangement: "Now, I'm not going to say I taught Terry how to play, because he already knew his stuff when I met him...He has become not only a fine musician, but an excellent entertainer." Waldo also studied piano with Roland Hanna, Dick Wellstood, Jaki Byard, and Peter Howard.

== Career ==
Waldo's range of expertise (composing, arranging, writing, directing, and performing) has been evidenced across a wide spectrum of media and performing arts. He continues to produce his own shows and recordings with his partner, Janice Lee, through Waldo/Lee Music Productions, Inc. Waldo/Lee recently provided production assistance for the latest revised edition of Waldo's book, This Is Ragtime for Jazz at Lincoln Center Library Editions, as well as reissuing the radio series of the same title made for NPR. The company is now developing a new Off-Broadway musical show for Waldo. Meanwhile, he continues a series of live performances in diverse venues including The Supreme Court, Jazz At Lincoln Center, The Smithsonian Institution, The Kennedy Center, Carnegie Hall (as a featured guest with the New York Pops) and The National Gallery of Arts in Washington.

Waldo began his professional career in 1963 by working in various restaurants around Columbus, Ohio. Soon, he began playing in several bands including Gene Mayl's Dixieland Rhythm Kings from Dayton, Ohio. Mayl's band was one of a few select hold-outs dotting the country from the traditional jazz revival of the 1940s. The twenty-year-old Waldo then appeared in New Orleans in 1964, playing with such notables as Kid Valentine and Johnny Wiggs. The Red Garter, home to various banjo bands, was one of his venues. In 1965 and 1966 he played in San Francisco at another Red Garter and at Earthquake Mcgoon's with West Coast jazz revival musicians. Waldo played with Turk Murphy's Jazz Band and studied with other prominent jazz musicians such as Pops Foster, Lu Watters, Wally Rose, and Clancy Hayes, while living in a room above Mcgoon's for one dollar per day.

Returning to Ohio, Waldo formed the Gutbucket Syncopators in 1969. This traditional jazz group included Frank Powers, Roy Tate, and Jim Snyder, among others. The Syncopators performed at festivals and clubs and made a number of recordings. This band attracted top musicians from Chicago and New York and featured such notable guest performers as George Rock (of Spike Jones fame), Ruth Brisbane, and Edith Wilson.

Waldo's twenty-six part NPR series, This is Ragtime, aired in 1974 and helped fuel the 1970s ragtime revival. The book of the same title grew out of that series: first published in 1976, and subsequently republished in 1991 and 2009. Eubie Blake, who wrote the introduction, credits his protégé: "Terry's love of Ragtime goes back a long way, long before its 'rediscovery.' People then were always trying to talk him out of playing that 'corny old stuff.'"

In 1975, Waldo met vocalist Susan La Marche, who would be his performing partner for twelve years. Together they performed at the 92nd Street Y, The Jazz Church in NYC, Jacob's Pillow, The Rahway Theatre, Carnegie Hall, and countless clubs, concerts, and festivals.

Waldo relocated to New York City in 1984, where he began playing solo at jazz clubs including The Cookery, The Village Gate, Hanratty's, The Village Corner, The Carnegie Tavern and The Knickerbocker. He also worked with his own Gotham City band at various venues including Michael's Pub, Cajun, Folk City and The Red Blazer.

Waldo continued to support the music scene of his native Ohio, forming Waldo's Ragtime Orchestra in 1980. This group, composed largely of members of Columbus Jazz Arts Group, performed concerts and recorded two albums for Stomp Off Records, which were later reissued by the classical record labels Musical Heritage Society and Sine Qua Non.

In 1984, The Gotham City Band was born. The band remains active through the present day, having recorded several albums, and headlining regularly at festivals, concerts, and venues in New York City, including Michael's Pub, Symphony Space and The Museum of Modern Art. Peter Ecklund, Dan Barrett, Howard Alden, Eddy Davis, Brian Nalepka, Chuck Wilson, and Arnie Kinsella, longtime associates, are but a few of the many superlative jazz and ragtime musicians who have been part of the group in its many incarnations over the years. Notable guests of the band include Odetta, Leon Redbone, Maurice Hines, Susan La Marche, and Colleen Hawks. In 2021, the band with Tatiana Eva-Marie released a new album titled I Double Dare You on the new Turtle Bay Records label.

To date, Waldo has produced and arranged more than 40 albums for many labels including Sony BMG, Blackbird, GHB, Stomp Off, Musical Heritage Society, Sine Qua Non, Metronome, and Delmark.

Television and film work include performances and compositions on The Tonight Show, the PBS documentary Storyville: The Naked Dance, and Ken Burns's PBS documentary, Unforgivable Blackness: The Rise and Fall of Jack Johnson. Waldo has also worked as a composer for a number of his own albums as well as others, including Leon Redbone. He has also composed the scores for a number of Off-Broadway shows including Warren G, Shake That Thing!, Sex, Drugs and Ukuleles, and Trophy Wife. His TV work has included a year as music director, talent and producer for the two-way television operation Warner Qube in 1978.

His work in New York City theatre includes credits as music director for shows such as Mr. Jelly Lord (directed by Vernel Bagneris), Playwrights Horizons production of Heliotrope Bouquet (directed by Joe Morton), Ambassador Satch (directed by André DeShields), and Warren G (directed by Tom O'Horgan), the Off-Broadway production of Shake That Thing!, The Leon Redbone Christmas Show at Town Hall, and Waldo's 1927 Revue. He has also been music director for shows with famous dancers such as The Nicholas Brothers, Bunny Briggs, Sandman Sims, and Maurice Hines as well as famous choreographers including Anna Sokolow, Danny Daniels, Donald Byrd and Mercedes Ellington. He has written and starred in several Off-Broadway one-man shows: Eubie and Me, and The Naked Dance: The Music of Storyville.

Waldo's work as a teacher began in Ohio at Denison University in the 1970s, with courses in jazz and ragtime history and in film, and continues to the present day with ragtime courses for Swing University at Jazz at Lincoln Center in 2009.

Waldo/Lee Music in conjunction with The 34th Street Partnership started in 2021 a series of performances with Waldo's Gotham City Band that plays two times a day, Spring, Summer and Fall, at various locations in Midtown New York. The company is now developing a new Off-Broadway musical show for Waldo. Waldo and Lee along with Charles Hobson and William Nix formed TIR, LLC in 2013 to produce a new documentary on Ragtime music.

In popular culture, his playing appears in the 2018 Rockstar video game Red Dead Redemption 2.

== Discography ==
- 1969 Waldo's Gutbucket Syncopators (GHB)
- 1971 Jazz in the Afternoon (Blackbird)
- 1974 Waldo's Gutbucket Syncopators, Ohio Theater Concert
- 1974 Snookums Rag (Dirty Shame Records)
- 1974 Jazz Babies - Terry Waldo & Susan LaMarche (Dirty Shame)
- 1974 Sounds of Ragtime & Vaudeville - Terry Waldo (Fat Cat Jazz)
- 1979 Harlem Style Hot Jazz (Dirty Shame)
- 1979 Feelin' Devilish (Stomp Off)
- 1980 Terry Waldo - Wizard of the Keyboard (Stomp Off Records)
- 1981 Waldo's Gutbucket Syncopators - Special Edition
- 1981 Smiles & Chuckles - Waldo's Ragtime Orchestra (Stomp Off)
- 1981 Waldo's Gutbucket Syncopators Presents (Stomp Off)
- 1982 Vamp ‘til Ready - Susan LaMarche/Waldo’s Gutbucket Syncopators
- 1982 Terry Waldo - Ragtime/Jazz (Sine Qua Non)
- 1983 Ragtime Vamp - Terry Waldo & Susan LaMarche (Sine Qua Non)
- 1984 Terry Waldo and the Gotham City Band (Stomp Off Records)
- 1984 Spectacular Ragtime - Waldo’s Ragtime Orchestra (Stomp Off)
- 1988 Ragtime Classics Volume 1 (Musical Heritage Society)
- 1988 Ragtime Classics Volume 2 (Musical Heritage Society)
- 1989 Masters of the Jazz Age (Musical Heritage Society)
- 1989 Footlight Varieties - Waldo’s Gotham City Band (Stomp Off)
- 1989 Waldo's Gutbucket Syncopators, Waldo's Gotham City Band – New Orleans Jazz Echoes (Musical Heritage Society)
- 1990 Vaudeville & Hot Jazz Songs - Terry Waldo & Susan LaMarche (Musical Heritage Society)
- 1994 American Ragtime Orchestra w Mas Ikemiya (BMG)
- 1997 Classic Waldo – Ragtime & Blues (Metronome)
- 1997 Jass and Blues (Metronome)
- 1998 Kinky & Sweet (Stomp Off)
- 2003 Sounds of Ragtime & Vaudeville Vol. 1 (Waldo/Lee Music)
- 2003 Sounds of Ragtime & Vaudeville Vol. 2 (Waldo/Lee)
- 2003 Just a Little While to Stay Here (Waldo/Lee)
- 2003 Let It Shine (Stomp Off)
- 2004 Hot House Rag (Delmark)
- 2009 Ohio Theater Concert Featuring Edith Wilson (Delmark)
- 2010 Ragtime: The Best of Terry Waldo Sampler (Waldo/Lee)
- 2014 The Soul of Ragtime (Tompkins Square)
- 2021 I Double Dare You - Terry Waldo’s Gotham City Band & Tatiana Eva-Marie (Turtle Bay Records)

== Bibliography ==
- Waldo, Terry. This is Ragtime. New York: Jazz at Lincoln Center Library Editions, 2009.
