= Antti Sarpila =

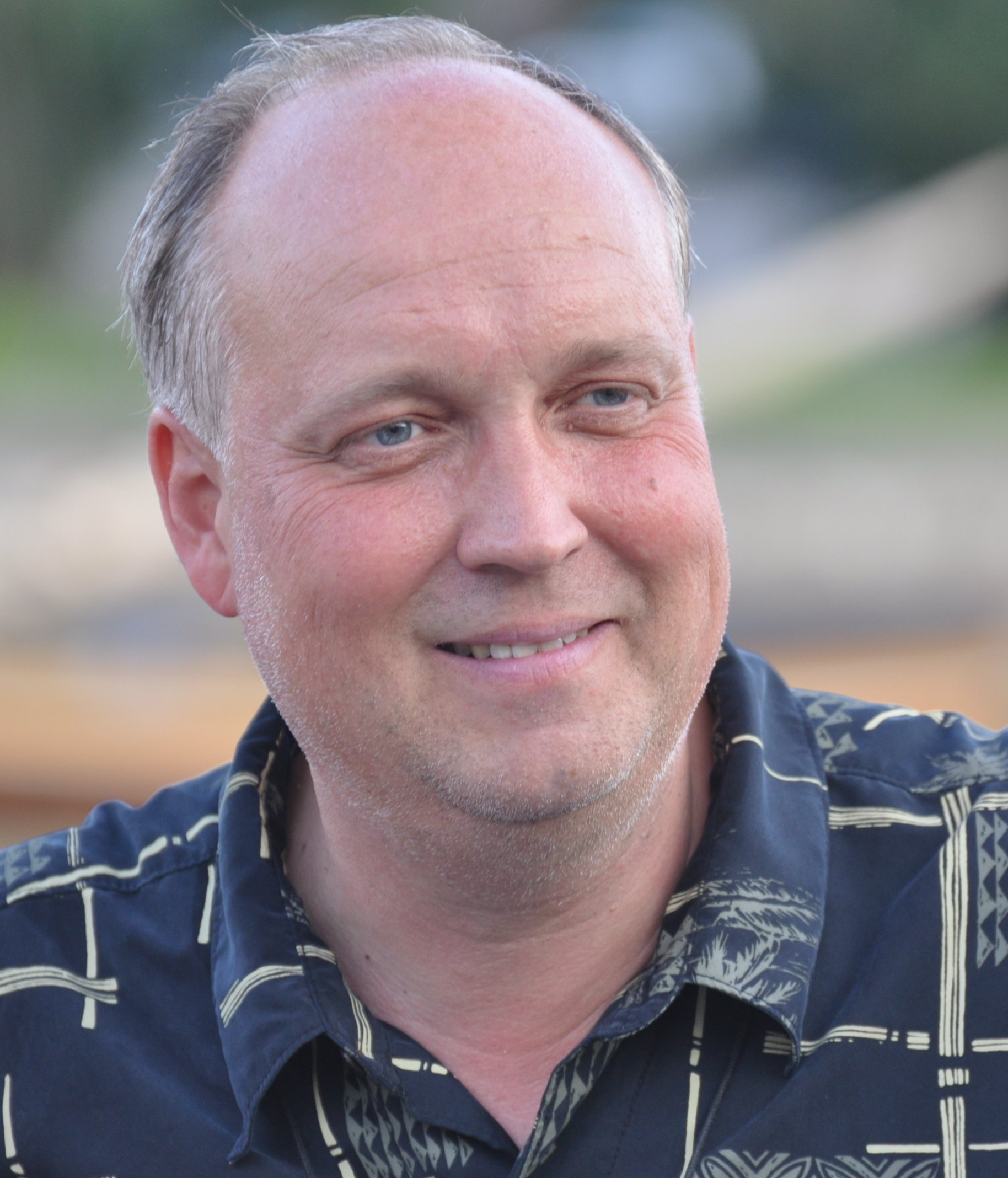
- Antti Sarpila in 2012

Background information
- Born: June 11, 1964 (age 61); Helsinki, Finland
- Genres: Jazz
- Occupation: Musician
- Instrument: Clarinet
- Years active: 1980s–present

Antti Juhani Sarpila (born 11 June 1964) is a Finnish jazz clarinetist.

He performed in a Benny Goodman-inspired style and studied under Bob Wilber. He was a part of the tribute to Benny Goodman at Carnegie Hall in 1988 and played in six American tours. His A. S. Swing Band was established in 1982 and has released over ten albums. An anniversary DVD, 20th Anniversary Concert live at Finlandia Hall was released in 2002. He performed at Carnegie Hall in 2000 with the Swedish Swing Society and has been in a quartet with Lars Erstrand, Mark Shane, and Björn Sjödin. He was a guest of Gerhard Aspheim's Oldtimers to celebrate the 25-year anniversary at Oslo Jazzfestival. He performed at the Oslo Jazzfestival 2006 with the Stokstad/Jensen Trad Band.

In 1997, he won the Yrjö award. According to the Finnish magazine Hymy (6–7/2008) Sarpila is a Freemason.

== Discography ==
- Original Antti Sarpila (Antti Sarpila Oy, 1990)
- Pori Big Band Plays Antti Sarpila (Antti Sarpila Oy, 1991)
- Happy Jazz Trio: Meet Me Tonight in Dreamland (Antti Sarpila Oy, 1991)
- Swinging Antti Sarpila (Antti Sarpila Oy, 1991)
- Tribute to Benny Goodman (Antti Sarpila Oy, 1992)
- Father & Son and Wholly Swing (Antti Sarpila, 1993)
- Live at Storyville (Antti Sarpila Oy, 1994)
- Antti Sarpila Meets Markku Johansson (Antti Sarpila Oy, 1996)
- Summit Meeting with Allan Vaché (Nagel Heyer Records, 1996)
- Swing Is Here with Allan Vaché (Nagel Heyer, 1997)
- 15th Anniversary (Antti Sarpila Oy, 1997)
- Stealin' Apples (Antti Sarpila Oy, 1998)
- The Swinging Beginning (Antti Sarpila Oy, 1999)
- Big Benny (Antti Sarpila Oy, 1999)
- Swinging at Storyville (Antti Sarpila Oy, 2000)
- New Moods - New Sounds (Blue Note, EMI, 2001)
- 20th Anniversary (Antti Sarpila Oy, 2002)
- She's Funny That Way with Johanna Iivanainen (Antti Sarpila Oy, 2002)
- Swinging Christmas (Antti Sarpila Oy, 2002)
- Portraits of Jazz by Antti Sarpila (Antti Sarpila Oy, 2003)
- Swinging Christmas Vol. II (Antti Sarpila Oy, 2003)
- Celebrating the 100th Anniversary of Fats Waller with Bob Barnard (Antti Sarpila Oy, 2004)
- Swinging' n' Singin with Eino Grön (Antti Sarpila Oy, 2004)
- Swinging Christmas with Eino Grön (Antti Sarpila Oy, 2004)
- Let's Swing: Antti Sarpila Plays a Tribute to the Benny Goodman Small Groups (Antti Sarpila Oy, 2005)
- Antti Sarpila Swing Band Featuring the Swinging Accordion of Seppo Hovi (Antti Sarpila Oy, 2005)
- Swinging Christmas with Johanna Iivanainen (Antti Sarpila Oy, 2005)
- Gospel & Spirituals (Antti Sarpila Oy, 2006)
- 25th Anniversary (Antti Sarpila Oy, 2007)
- Swinging the Classics (Antti Sarpila Oy, 2008)
- We'd Like New York ... In June! (Arbors Records, 2009)
