= Banu Gibson =

New Orleans singer

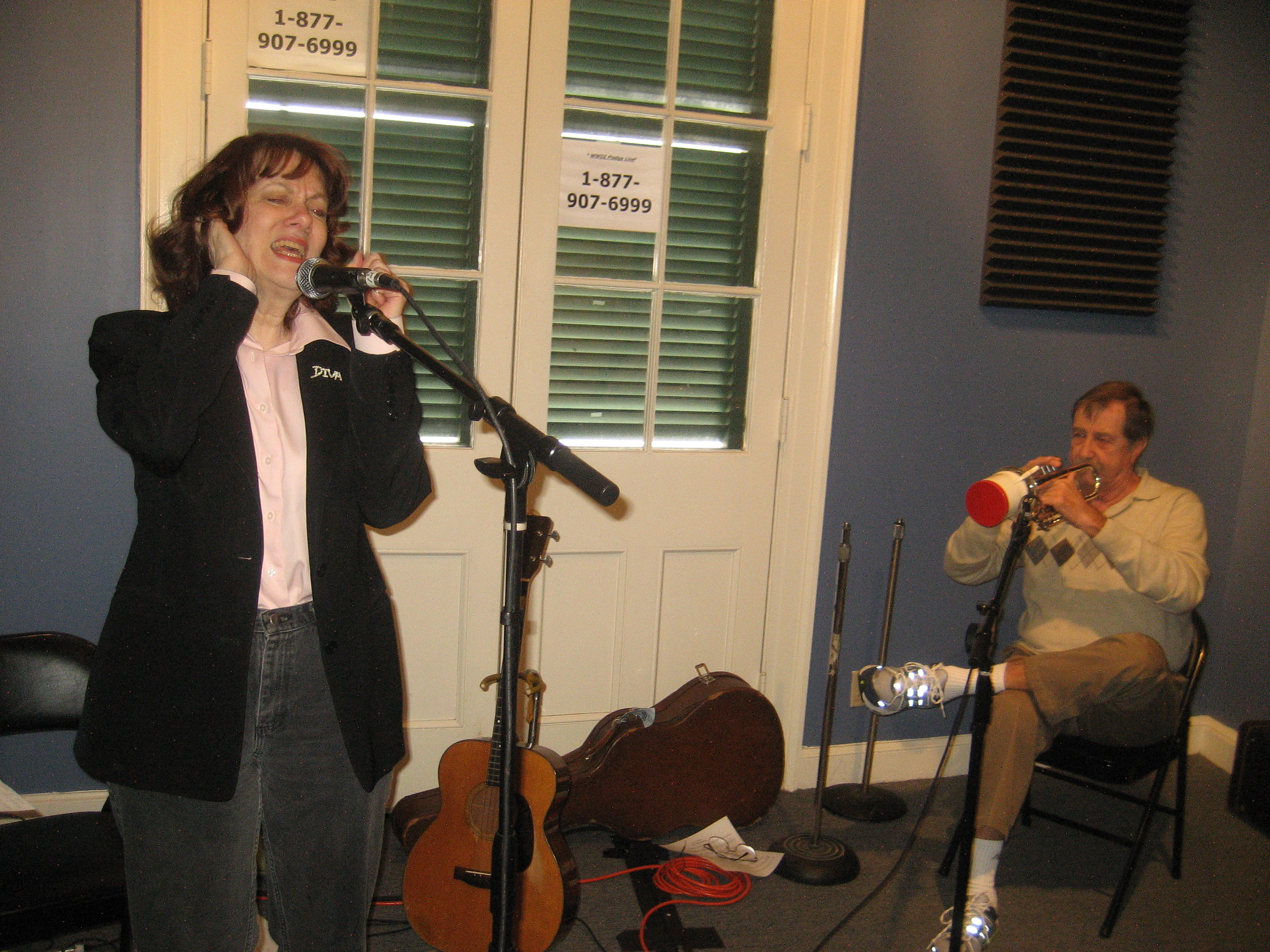
Banu singing with Connie Jones

Banu Gibson is an American singer and bandleader who performs music from the 1920's, 30's, and 40's. She is executive director of The New Orleans Trad Jazz Camp. Banu has recorded for the record labels World, Stomp Off, Jazzology, and her own label Swing Out.

== Early life ==
Gibson was born in Dayton, Ohio and raised in Hollywood, Florida where she started taking dance lessons at age 3. She started taking voice lessons at age 9, and was dancing professionally by her teenage years. She graduated from college in Florida with a degree in music and theater.

== Musical career ==
Banu's first steady gig was 1967 in Miami working alongside Phil Napoleon at a club owned by Jackie Gleason. Working as a dancer at the club, she was exposed to the sounds of traditional jazz every night. When she moved to New York City at 21 she joined the group My Father's Mustache, and toured with them as a singer and a dancer from 1969-1972. When venues were too small for dancing, she started to focus more on her singing. She also sang and danced at Disneyland for their show called "Class of '27".

Gibson married Buzz Podewell and moved to New Orleans in 1973 when Podewell got a job at Tulane University. He was a banjo player and encouraged Banu to pick up the instrument to get more work. She also started playing guitar at the suggestion of her long time accompanist and arranger, pianist David Boeddinghaus. In 1981 Banu started her New Orleans Hot Jazz Orchestra, in order to start playing bars on Bourbon Street. The band well exceeded those original intentions, becoming a regular act at Jazz Festivals around the world, and playing with symphony orchestras in St. Louis, Cincinnati, Indianapolis, Phoenix, Tucson, San Diego, the Boston Pops, and New Orleans. Gibson toured Europe with Wild Bill Davison and she performed with the World's Greatest Jazz Band in Japan. Another distinguished performance was a three-night concert at the Hollywood Bowl with John Mauceri and the Hollywood Bowl Symphony Orchestra.

== Awards ==
- New Orleans Music Magazine's Jazz All-Star (2007)
- New Orleans Magazine's "Top Female Achiever" (2010)
- Preservation Resource Center Honoree (2014)

== Discography ==
- Jazz Me Blues (World Jazz, 1980)
- On Tour (Jazzology, 1982)
- Jazz Baby (Stomp Off, 1983)
- Jazz Me Blues (Jazzology, 1985)
- Let Yourself Go (Swing Out, 1988)
- On Tour (Jazzology 1988)
- Livin' In A Great Big Way (Swing Out, 1990)
- You Don't Know My Mind (Swing Out, 1990)
- Zat You, Santa Claus? (Swing Out, 1995)
- Love Is Good For Anything That Ails You (Swing Out, 1997)
- My Romance: A Love Story In Song (Swing Out, 1999)
- Steppin' Out (with Bucky Pizzarelli) (Swing Out, 2002)
- Banu Gibson Sings Johnny Mercer (Swing Out, 2003)
- Let's Face The Music And Dance (Swing Out, 2007)
- Banu Gibson Sings More Johnny Mercer (Swing Out, 2008)
- By Myself (Swing Out, 2017)
