= Allan Vaché =

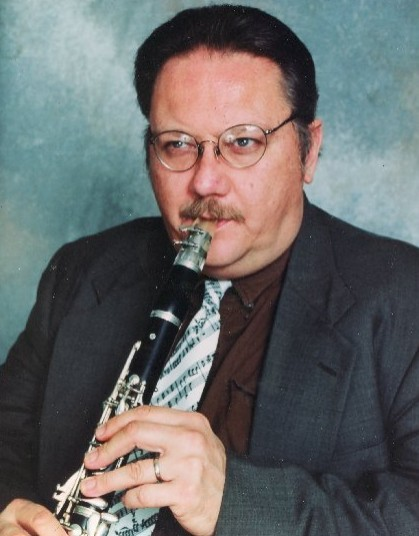

Background information
- Born: December 16, 1953 (age 72); Rahway, New Jersey, U.S.
- Origin: San Antonio, Texas
- Genres: Jazz
- Occupation: Musician
- Instrument: Clarinet
- Labels: Arbors, Audiophile, Chesky, Nagel-Heyer, Jazzology
- Formerly of: Jim Cullum Jazz Band
- Website: allanvachemusic.us

Allan Vaché (born December 16, 1953) is an American jazz clarinetist, son of the jazz bassist and journalist Warren Vaché Sr. and brother of jazz cornetist Warren Vaché Jr.

Raised in Rahway, New Jersey, Vaché graduated from Rahway High School in 1971.

Vaché played with the Jim Cullum Jazz Band of San Antonio, Texas, for seventeen years and was a regular on the Riverwalk – Live from the Landing radio show on Public Radio International, which featured the Cullum band. He performed with Cullum on A Prairie Home Companion with Garrison Keillor. He is a featured performer on Gershwin's "Porgy & Bess" with the Cullum band, released on CBS Masterworks. He toured Mexico for the U.S. State Department with the live show of Porgy & Bess, narrated by opera singer William Warfield. Vaché has performed at Carnegie Hall and Lincoln Center in New York and The Kennedy Center in Washington D.C.

He graduated from Rahway High School in 1971. He has performed with, or appeared on stage with Benny Goodman, Teddy Wilson, Lionel Hampton, Pete Fountain, Clark Terry, Benny Carter, Milt Hinton, Bob Haggart, Yank Lawson, Bucky Pizzarelli, Gene Krupa, Jake Hanna, Scott Hamilton, Herb Ellis, and many others. He has also performed with pop artists Bonnie Raitt and Leon Redbone and can be heard on the soundtrack of the 1998 film The Newton Boys starring Matthew McConaughey and Julianna Margulies.

He has several recordings as a soloist on the Arbors, Audiophile, Chesky, and Nagel-Heyer (of Hamburg, Germany) record labels. Vaché has performed in Europe, Asia, Australia, and South America.
