= Peter Ecklund =

American musician (1945–2020)

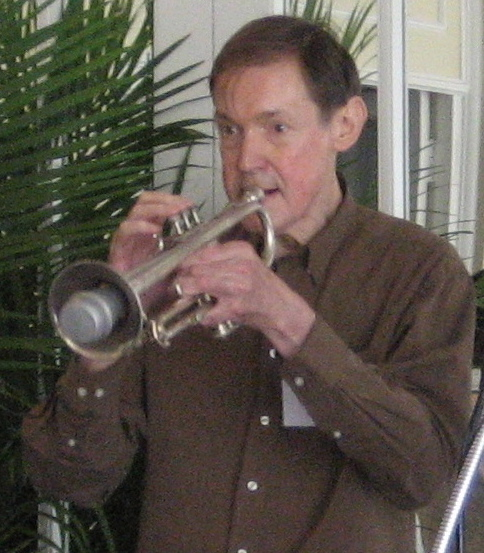
- Ecklund in 2007

Background information
- Born: September 27, 1945; Woodbridge, Connecticut, U.S.
- Died: April 8, 2020 (aged 74) Brooklyn, New York, U.S.
- Genres: Jazz, classical, folk
- Occupation: Musician
- Instrument: Cornet
- Years active: 1960s–2020
- Labels: Stomp Off, Arbors
- Website: peterecklundmusic.com

Peter Ecklund (September 27, 1945–April 8, 2020) was an American jazz cornetist.

== Early life ==
In 1967, Ecklund received a degree from Yale University. At Yale, he was known as a trumpet virtuoso and skilled whistler, being president of the school band his senior year..

== Career ==
Ecklund He went on tour with singer Paula Lockheart and started a jazz band, in addition to working with many pop and rock bands in the 1970s and 1980s. He became a substitute for the Nighthawks Orchestra led by Vince Giordano and a member of the Orphan Newboys led by Marty Grosz.

Ecklund died April 8, 2020, from Parkinson's disease.

== Discography ==
- Peter Ecklund and the Melody Makers (Stomp Off, 1988)
- Laughing at Life with the Orphan Newsboys (Stomp Off, 1991)
- Ecklund at Elkhart (Jazzology, 1995)
- Strings Attached (Arbors, 1996)
- Christmas at the Almanac Music Hall with Howard Fishman (Almanac, 1999)

=== As guest ===
With David Bromberg

- Wanted Dead or Alive (Columbia, 1974)
- Midnight on the Water (Columbia, 1975)
- How Late'll Ya Play 'Til (Fantasy, 1976)
- Bandit in a Bathing Suit (Fantasy, 1978)
- You Should See the Rest of the Band (Fantasy, 1980)

With Marty Grosz

- Marty Grosz and the Keepers of the Flame (and the Imps) (Stomp Off, 1987)
- Unsaturated Fats (Stomp Off, 1990)
- On Revival Day (Jazzology, 1995)
- Going Hollywood (Stomp Off, 1997)

With Geoff Muldaur

- Pottery Pie (Reprise, 1968)
- Sweet Potatoes (Reprise, 1972)
- Blues Boy (Flying Fish, 1979)
- Private Astronomy (Edge Music, 2003)

With Leon Redbone

- Red to Blue (August, 1985)
- Sugar (Private Music, 1990)
- Whistling in the Wind (Private Music, 1994)

With others

- Paul Butterfield, Better Days (Bearsville, 1973)
- Doveman, With My Left Hand I Raise the Dead (Brassland, 2007)
- Bob Dylan, Tell Tale Signs (Columbia/Legacy, 2008)
- Howard Fishman, The Howard Fishman Quartet (Monkey Farm, 1999), Howard Fishman Quartet Vol. II (Monkey Farm, 2005), Moon Country (Monkey Farm, 2011)
- Steve Forbert, Steve Forbert (Epic, Nemperor, 1982)
- Gloria Gaynor, Glorious (Polydor, 1977)
- Steve Goodman, Words We Can Dance To (Asylum, 1976)
- Hello People, the Handsome Devils (ABC, 1974)
- Ian & Sylvia & the Great Speckled Bird, You Were on My Mind (Columbia, 1972)
- Keith Ingham, Just Imagine (Stomp Off,)
- Michael Jerling, My Evil Twin (Shanachie, 1992)
- George McCrae, Diamond Touch (T.K., 1976)
- Martin Mull, Martin Mull (Capricorn, 1972)
- Alex Pangman, Can't Stop Me from Dreaming (Sensation, 2001)
- Bonnie Raitt, Give It Up (Warner Bros., 1972)
- Tom Sancton, Tommy Sancton and the Galvanized Washboard Band (G.H.B.,)
- Cynthia Sayer, Jazz at Home (Jazzology, 1997)
- Cynthia Sayer Featuring Kenny Davern, Forward Moves (Yerba Buena,)
- Johnny Shines, Johnny Shines & Co. (Biograph, 1974)
- Johnny Shines, Mr. Cover Shaker (Biograph, 1992)
- Paul Siebel, Jack-Knife Gypsy (Elektra, 1971)
- Siegel–Schwall Band, 953 West (Wooden Nickel 1973)
- Eric Von Schmidt, 2nd Right 3rd Row (Poppy, 1972)
- Eric Von Schmidt, Eric Von Schmidt and the Cruel Family (Philo, 1978)
- Andrea True Connection, More, More, More (Buddah, 1976)
- Terry Waldo, Footlight Varieties (Stomp Off, 1990)
- Terry Waldo, Presents the Jazz Entertainers Vol. 1 Let It Shine (Stomp Off, 2003)
- Loudon Wainwright III, Social Studies (Hannibal, 1999)
- Loudon Wainwright III, High Wide and Handsome: The Charlie Poole Project (Proper, 2009)
- Mitch Woods, Mr. Boogie's Back in Town (Blind Pig, 1988)
