= Jim Cullum Jr. =

American musician (1941–2019)

- Born: James Albert Cullum Jr. September 20, 1941; Dallas, Texas, U.S.
- Died: August 11, 2019 (aged 77); Alamo Heights, Texas
- Occupations: Musician; grocer
- Known for: Jim Cullum Jazz Band
- Musical career
- Genres: Trad Jazz; Jazz; Big Band
- Instrument: Cornet
- Years active: 1963–2019
- Labels: Jazzology; Columbia; Audiophile; Stomp Off; Riverwalk Jazz

James Albert Cullum Jr., better known as Jim Cullum Jr. (September 20, 1941 – August 11, 2019), was an American jazz cornetist known for his contributions to Dixieland jazz. His father was Jim Cullum Sr., a clarinetist who led the Happy Jazz Band from 1962 to 1973. Jim Cullum Jr. led the Jim Cullum Jazz Band as its successor. His bandmates included Evan Christopher, Allan Vaché, and John Sheridan.

== Early life ==
James A. Cullum Jr. was born in Dallas, Texas, on September 20, 1941, to wholesale grocer and part-time musician, James Albert Cullum Sr., and Conoly née Prendergast. The family moved to San Antonio, Texas in 1953. As a child, Cullum Jr. became enamored of his father's music collection that included recordings by Bix Beiderbecke, Louis Armstrong, Blind Lemon Jefferson, and Lead Belly. He bought his first cornet at the age of fourteen from a pawn shop for seven dollars. While attending Alamo Heights High School, Cullum played with a small jazz ensemble where his father would occasionally sit in on saxophone. He also performed locally around San Antonio as a teen, honing his skills. Following high school, Cullum married Susan Kelso, and joined his father in the grocery business.

== Career ==
=== Happy Jazz and The Landing nightclub ===
Cullum's enthusiasm and passion for performing jazz led to his father coming out of retirement from the music industry in 1962 to form the Happy Jazz Band with him. The band's music was heavily influenced by the hot jazz ensembles of the 1920s and '30s. In 1963, the Cullums, along with a group of San Antonio investors, founded The Landing Jazz Club in the basement of the Nix Hospital building on the San Antonio River Walk. The Landing was the second business and first nightclub established on the Riverwalk following the opening of the Casa Rio Mexican restaurant. After interest in the group suddenly grew following their exposure to the HemisFair crowds of 1968, the Cullums sold their grocery business, and devoted themselves full-time to music. Happy Jazz and its successor band performed at The Landing five or six nights a week for the next four and a half decades. Cullum Jr. took over leadership of the band after his father died in 1973. At that time, he changed the band's name to the Jim Cullum Jazz Band.

=== Jim Cullum Jazz Band ===
The Jim Cullum Jazz Band was an acoustic seven-piece traditional jazz ensemble. The band broadcast weekly performances from The Landing on the Public Radio International (US public radio) series Riverwalk Jazz from 1989 until 2012. Cullum and his band performed at such venues as Carnegie Hall, Preservation Hall, the White House, Wolf Trap, and the Kennedy Center. They appeared on Austin City Limits on several occasions, and for 25 years broadcast weekly live performances on over 200 radio stations in the US. The Jim Cullum Jazz Band performed over 300 jazz masses at houses of worship across the United States during its more than four-decade run. The group recorded for Jazzology, Columbia, Audiophile, Stomp Off, and his own label, Riverwalk.

Cullum played with such music legends as Louis Armstrong, Benny Goodman, Pete Fountain, and Earl Hines. Early in his career, he played with Jack Teagarden—a friend and associate of his father's. Cullum's career also led him to accompany other jazz artists such as Joe Venuti, Doc Severinsen, Dick Hyman, and Lionel Hampton. From 1993 to 2005, Cullum and his band were on the faculty of the Stanford Jazz Workshop at Stanford University in California.

== Later life and death ==
During his life, Cullum led what was described as an elegant-bohemian lifestyle by one jazz publication. He remained active even after the radio show and his longstanding residency at The Landing ended in 2012. In his final years, he appeared in weekly performances at the Cookhouse Restaurant in San Antonio and scheduled many other appearances with his band. His last public performance was just two days before his death. Cullum died on August 11, 2019, at his residence in San Antonio.

== Legacy ==
In 2011, Stanford University Libraries acquired Cullum's Riverwalk Jazz archives, comprising over 400 radio show programs. In January 2013, Stanford's Archive of Recorded Sound made the recordings available to listen to on its website.

== Band members ==
=== Current members ===
- Evan Arntzen – clarinet, saxophone
- Mike Pittsley – trombone
- Howard Elkins – banjo, guitar
- Bernie Attridge – bass
- Benji Bohannon – drums

=== Former members ===
- Jim Cullum Jr. – cornet
- Buddy Apfel – tuba
- Robert Black – banjo
- Evan Christopher – clarinet
- Kevin Dorn – drums
- Ron Hockett – clarinet, saxophone
- Ed Hubble – trombone
- Jim Hunter – bass
- Don Mopsick – bass
- Brian Nalepka – tuba, double bass, bass sax
- Brian Ogilvie – clarinet, saxophone
- Steve Pikal – bass
- Ric Ramirez – bass
- Randy Reinhart – cornet, trombone
- Kenny Rupp – trombone
- Zack Sapunor – bass
- John Sheridan – piano
- Hal Smith – drums
- Ed Torres – drums
- Jim Turner – piano
- Allan Vaché – clarinet
- Mike Waskiewicz – drums
- Jack Wyatt – bass
- Cullen Offer – tenor saxophone
- Mike Masessa - drums

== Discography ==
- Look Over Here (1976)
- Jim Cullum's Happy Jazz Band (1979)
- Live and Swinging (1979)
- Live at the Memphis Jazz Festival (1982)
- 'Tis the Season... To Be Jammin'! (1984)
- Porgy & Bess (1985)
- Super Satch (1986)
- Fireworks! Red Hot & Blues (1989)
- Hooray for Hoagy! (1990)
- American Love Songs, Vol. 7 (1990)
- Shootin' the Agate (1992)
- Battle of the Bands: San Antonio vs. New Orleans (1992)
- New Year's All Star Jam (1993)
- Honky Tonk Train (1994)
- Bessie & the Blues (1995)
- Jim Cullum's Happy Jazz Band (1995)
- Hot Jazz for a Cool Yule (1996)
- Fireworks! Red Hot & Blues (1996)
- American Love Songs, Vol. 7 (1997)
- Deep River: The Spirit of Gospel Music in Jazz (1998)
- Cornet-Copia (2001)
- Chasin' the Blues (2006)
- 3 Kings of Jazz: The Music of Louis Armstrong, Bix Beiderbecke and Jelly Roll Morton (2008)

== See also ==
The Mission City Hot Rhythm Cats, a six-piece traditional jazz band, is composed of several former members of the Jim Cullum Jazz Band.
