= Johnny Varro =

American jazz pianist

- Born: Johnny Varro c. 1930
- Origin: Brooklyn, New York, U.S.
- Genres: Jazz
- Instrument: Piano

Johnny Varro (born 1930) is a pianist with roots in the swing style of jazz. He is also a leader and arranger.

== Commodore Music Shop ==
Varro was born in Brooklyn, New York. He began studying piano at the age of ten. During his teenage years, he was introduced to jazz by way of the Commodore Music Shop in New York City. There he met the manager Jack Crystal (father of Billy Crystal), who was running jam sessions on the Lower East Side. At these sessions, Johnny met some of the greatest players of the era, such as Willie "The Lion" Smith, Big Sid Catlett, Joe Thomas, Hot Lips Page, Joe Sullivan, Pete Brown and others. The experience of sitting in for Joe Sullivan and Willie "The Lion" Smith was invaluable and soon allowed Johnny to become a hired player.

== New York: Bobby Hackett and Eddie Condon ==
Johnny's first professional job was with Bobby Hackett touring the East Coast with his quartet. In 1954 he worked at Nick's with Phil Napoleon and later with Pee Wee Erwin. In 1957 Eddie Condon asked Johnny to play at his club as intermission pianist. During that gig, he met more musicians who began calling him for jobs. The Condon gig extended into Johnny becoming Condon's band pianist. The players in Condon's band at this time included Buck Clayton, Wild Bill Davison, Pee Wee Russell, Cutty Cutshall, Lou McGarity, George Wettling, Yank Lawson, Peanuts Hucko and others.

For the next several years between the Condon tours, Johnny worked most of the jazz rooms around New York including The Embers, The Roundtable, Condon's Uptown (with Edmond Hall), The Metropole and many others. Musicians such as Henry "Red" Allen, Roy Eldridge, Coleman Hawkins, Bobby Hackett, Charlie Shavers, Jo Jones and Jonah Jones helped further his musical education.

== Dukes of Dixieland and the Gleason Show ==
In 1965 he moved to Miami Beach and worked on the Jackie Gleason Show. He also worked with Flip Phillips, Billy Butterfield, Phil Napoleon and toured with the Dukes of Dixieland.

== Gatsby's and Swing 7 ==
Then came another move in 1979 to Los Angeles, California, where he lived, played and toured for the next 14 years. He played with Eddie Miller, Dick Cathcart, Tommy Newsom, Red Norvo, Abe Lincoln, Bob Havens, and Jack Sheldon. He also did a five-year solo stint at Gatsby's Restaurant in Brentwood. It was in Los Angeles where the idea was born to organize a swing group covering the styles of the '30s, '40s, and '50s. This group, known as the Swing 7, has played many of the Jazz festivals and parties.

== Arbors Records, concerts, and jazz festivals ==
The last move took him in 1993 to Florida where he now resides, in the Tampa Bay area. He has many recordings on a variety of labels. The most recent recordings have been for Arbors Records where he has recorded extensively in solo, trio and band format under his own name. He also has recorded many times as a sideman for Arbors. And he can be heard on several recordings on the Nagel-Heyer label (Hamburg, Germany).

He continues to play jazz festivals, jazz parties and concerts in the United States, Switzerland, and Germany. Jazz festivals include San Diego, Sacramento (Emperor in 2003), Odessa, Elkhart, and Roswell.

== References and sources ==
- Official Web site
- Jazz Gentry: Aristocrats of the Music World, Warren Vaché, Sr., Rowman & Littlefield Publishers, 1999, Chapter 34
- The Biographical Encyclopedia of Jazz, Leonard Feather and Ira Gitler, second (revised) edition (Oxford University Press), 1999
- Richard Cook's Jazz Encyclopedia, Richard Cook, Penguin, 2005
- Johnny Varro Discography
- Johnny Varro Roots
- The Mississippi Rag, September 1994, cover article on Johnny Varro, by Warren Vaché, Sr.
- Johnny Varro Discography, produced and published by Gerard Bielderman, October 2012
- "Sweet & Hot Music Festival" Program, by Charles Champlin, April 30-September 2, 2002, p. 5 (online)
- "Sacramento Jazz Jubilee" Souvenir Program, May 23–26, 2003, p. 10 (online)
