= Arbors Records =

- Founded: 1989
- Founder: Mat Domber; Rachel Domber
- Distributor: MVD Entertainment Group
- Genre: Jazz
- Country of origin: U.S.
- Location: Clearwater, Florida
- Official website: arborsrecords.com

Arbors Records is a record company and independent record label in Clearwater, Florida. It was founded by Mat and Rachel Domber in 1989 and was initially devoted to the recordings of their friend, Rick Fay.

Arbors became known in the 1990s for swing music and Dixieland jazz, though its catalogue encompasses other forms of contemporary and classic jazz. Its roster includes Dan Barrett, Ruby Braff, Bob Wilber, Dave Frishberg, and Bucky Pizzarelli.

== Roster ==
- Joe Ascione
- Ehud Asherie
- Dan Barrett
- Ruby Braff
- James Chirillo
- Evan Christopher
- Joe Cohn
- Kenny Davern
- Peter Ecklund
- Rick Fay
- Chris Flory
- Johnny Frigo
- Dave Frishberg
- Wycliffe Gordon
- Marty Grosz
- Bob Haggart
- Jake Hanna
- Chuck Hedges
- Joel Helleny
- Skitch Henderson
- Eddie Higgins
- Maurice Hines
- Dick Hyman
- Jane Jarvis
- Jon-Erik Kellso
- Rebecca Kilgore
- Walt Levinsky
- George Masso
- Louis Mazetier
- Michael Moore
- Tommy Newsom
- Ken Peplowski
- Bucky Pizzarelli
- Herb Pomeroy
- Scott Robinson
- John Sheridan
- Carol Sloane
- Derek Smith
- Statesmen of Jazz
- Ralph Sutton
- Ross Tompkins
- Warren Vaché Jr.
- Johnny Varro
- George Wein
- Aaron Weinstein
- Bob Wilber
