= Ron Dewar =

American jazz multi-instrumentalist (1941–2024)

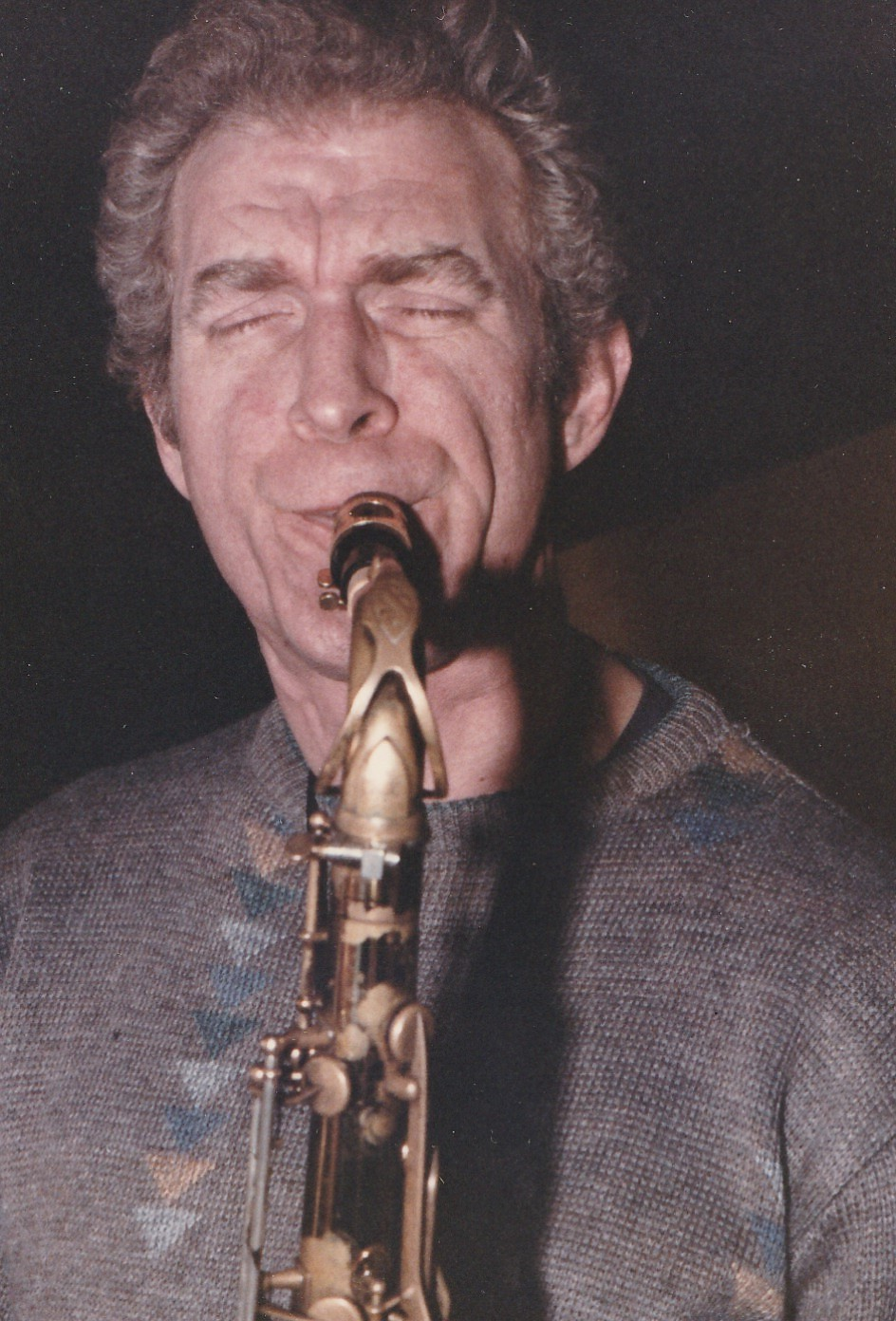
- Dewar, undated photograph

Background information
- Born: Ronald Bruce Dewar; July 22, 1941; Joliet, Illinois, U.S.
- Died: 4 January 2024 (aged 82) Blanding, Utah, U.S.
- Genre: Jazz
- Occupations: Musician; music educator
- Instruments: Saxophone; clarinet; bassoon
- Years active: 1959–2023
- Formerly of: Memphis Nighthawks
- Education: University of Illinois Urbana-Champaign
- Employer: University of Illinois Urbana-Champaign

Ronald Bruce Dewar (July 22, 1941 – January 4, 2024) was an American saxophonist, clarinetist, and bassoonist who grew up in Plainfield, Illinois, and worked in the Chicago area. His father, Robert Dewar, worked in a bowling alley; his mother, Ruth Jahneke Dewar, taught music; and his younger brothers, Roger and Randy, grew up to perform and teach music.

== Biography ==
Born in Joliet, Illinois, Dewar began playing saxophone at age 15. After hearing Joe Farrell at a Joliet club, Dewar decided to attend college where Farrell studied. Dewar attended the University of Illinois Urbana-Champaign and joined the jazz band led by John Garvey from 1959 to 1962. Dewar rejoined the band from 1968 to 1972. Dewar would play in the band again as adjunct faculty in 1980–1981.

In March 1968, he was awarded "top tenor saxophone" at the Notre Dame Collegiate Jazz Festival with judges Oliver Nelson, Ray Brown, Robert Share, Gerald Wilson, and Dan Morgenstern. Freddie Hubbard and Wayne Shorter were scheduled to adjudicate but both had to cancel. Willis Conover was MC. Saxophonist Michael Brecker from Indiana University won "outstanding musician".

He was a featured soloist of the University of Illinois Jazz Band in 1968 during a two-month State Department–sponsored tour to Ireland, Romania, Yugoslavia, Austria, Finland, Sweden, Norway, and Czechoslovakia. The band consisted of Don Smith (vocals, flute); Ken Ferrantino, Jim Darling, Jerry Tessin (trumpet); Cecil Bridgewater, Jim Knapp (trumpet, flugelhorn); Dave Sporny, Larry Dwyer, Frank Harmantas (trombone); Rich Rousch (bass trombone, baritone horn); John Prendergast (tuba); Howie Smith, John Wonsowicz, Dewar, Larry Cangelosi, Bill Feldman (saxophone); Ron Elliston (piano); Fred Atwood (bass); Chuck Braugham (drums); Bill Fries (percussion).

On March 14, 1969, Dewar performed at the Notre Dame Collegiate Jazz Festival with the University of Illinois Jazz Band and with his own quartet of Jim Knapp, John Monaghan, and Chuck Braugham. He was awarded a special plaque for his saxophone playing. The judges were Clark Terry, Ernie Wilkins, Dan Morgenstern, Thad Jones, Gary McFarland, and Sonny Stitt.

In June 1969, the University of Illinois Jazz Band performed at the New Orleans Jazz Festival. Recordings were made of the band backing Sarah Vaughan and Gerry Mulligan. Dewar can be heard briefly soloing with Sarah Vaughn on "There Will Never Be Another You".

From November 11 to December 23, 1969, the University of Illinois Jazz Band toured the Soviet Union. Dewar wrote a fanfare for two saxophones based on Uzbek themes.

On July 31, 1971, the University of Illinois Jazz Band performed at New York City's Town Hall with Gary Burton on vibraphone. Dewar was a featured soloist on several pieces.

In the 1970s, while playing with the Chicago Hot Six, with Ed "Doc" Kittrell (trumpet) and Roy Rubinstein (trombone), Dewar developed a passion for the music of New Orleans. He studied the New Orleans clarinetists Omer Simeon, Johnny Dodds, Barney Bigard, and Sidney Bechet and incorporated their styles in his playing, sometimes even playing an older-style Albert system clarinet. He concentrated on recordings of Jelly Roll Morton and the early King Oliver sides with Louis Armstrong on second cornet, arranging many of these tunes for the Memphis Nighthawks, and inspired many other players to pursue this music.

In the 1980s, Dewar and drummer Phil Gratteau joined the Brazilian musicians Breno and Neusa Sauer and Paulinho Garcia in a Chicago group called Made in Brazil. In 1984, they recorded "Tudo Joia" for Pausa Records, a blend of contemporary bossa nova and samba with a jazz flavor. Dewar performed at the Chicago Jazz Festival in 1986.

Dewar appeared at the first Chicago Jazz Festival and frequently in the years that followed.

=== Chicago Jazz Festival appearances ===
Year	Group
1979	Little Brother Montgomery and the State Street Ramblers
1981	Jazz Members Big Band
1982	Made in Brazil and Mike Ferro Quintet
1985	New Memphis Nighthawks
1986	Kelly Brand Quartet
1987	Ellington Dynasty
1990	The Champaign Connection featuring Rachael Lee
1991	Kelly Brand Quartet
1994	Fletcher Basington Orchestra
1996	John Brumbach / Ron Dewar Quintet
2008	Ron Dewar Quintet
2021	John Brumbach / Ron Dewar Quintet

== Discography ==
Year	Artist	Album	Label
1967	University of Illinois Jazz Band	Collegiate Jazz Festival – 1967	Not on label
1969	Salvatore Martirano	L's GA – Ballad – Octet	Polydor
1969	University of Illinois Jazz Band	Orchestra de Jazz a Universității Din Illinois	Electrecord
1969	University of Illinois Jazz Band	In Stockholm, Sweden	Century
1969	University of Illinois Jazz Band	University of Illinois Jazz Band and Dixie Band	Century
1969	Sarah Vaughan	Jazzfest Masters	Scotti Bros.
1969	Gerry Mulligan	Jazzfest Masters	Scotti Bros.
1970	University of Illinois Jazz Band	The University of Illinois Jazz Band with Don Smith	Mark
1970	University of Illinois Jazz Band	The University of Illinois Jazz Band and the Hot 7 at CJF	Mark
1971	Edwin London / George Crumb	Portraits of Three Ladies (American) / Madrigals, Books I–IV	Acoustic Research
1975	Peter Berkow & Friends	Thesis	Not on label
1976	The Ship	Tornado	Saturday Night
1977	The Memphis Nighthawks	Jazz Lips	Delmark
1977	The Memphis Nighthawks	Live at the Stabilizer	Golden Crest
1977	Various artists	Bix Lives (Volume 12)	Not on label
1979	The Chicago Hot Six	In Concert: The Chicago Hot Six	Blackbird
1981	Thom Bishop	The Wireless Wonder	Stuff
1982	Duke Tumatoe and the All Star Frogs	Back to Chicago	Trouserworm Tunes
1982	University of Illinois Jazz Band	Closeout	Dancing Bear
1983	Champaign	Modern Heart	CBS
1983	Little Brother Montgomery and the Jazz Allstars	Little Brother Montgomery and the Jazz Allstars	FM
1983	The Chicago Hot Six; Special Guest Leon Oakley	Stomping at the Good Time	GHB
1984	Made in Brasil	Tudo Joia	Pausa
1985	Judy Roberts	You Are There	Pausa
1989	Classic Jazz Ensemble	Classic Blues	Delmark
1990	Laurel Massé	Again	Disques Beaupré
1991	Emily Haddad	Emily Haddad	Sharp 5 Productions
1996	Andre Williams with the El Dorados	Greasy	Norton
1998	Salvatore Martirano	O, O, O, O, That Shakespeherian Rag	New World
2001	Steve Rashid and the Woodside Avenue All-Stars	Fidgety Feet	Woodside Avenue
2001	Bob Dogan	Salishan	Big Foot Jazz
2005	Sons of the Never Wrong	Nuthatch Suite	Gadfly
2006	W. A. Mathieu	Ghost Opera – Improvised Ensemble Music, 1971	Cold Mountain Music
2007	Various artists	Romanian Jazz: Jazz from the Electrecord Archives, 1966–1978	Sonar Kollektiv
2012	Champaign	Modern Heart / Woman in Flames	Columbia
Unknown	Thomas Gunther Trio	Swingin' Big at Willowbrook	Not on label
Unknown	Johnny Rinaldo, His Trumpet and Orchestra	From Out of the Midwest	J and D
