= Jim Knapp =

American jazz trumpeter (1939–2021)

- Born: James Donald Knapp, Jr. July 28, 1939; Chicago, Illinois, U.S.
- Died: November 13, 2021 (aged 82) Kirkland, Washington, U.S.
- Occupation: Musician
- Instrument: Trumpet
- Years active: 1962 - 2021

James Donald Knapp, Jr. (July 28, 1939 - November 13, 2021) was an American jazz trumpeter, composer, and educator. He taught at Cornish College of the Arts in Seattle for 45 years.

== Biography ==
Jim Knapp was born on July 28, 1939, in Chicago, Illinois, U.S. He studied piano at age six and took up trumpet at age twelve. He studied music composition at the University of Illinois Urbana-Champaign with Kenneth Gaburo and received a Bachelor of Music from the University of Illinois in 1962. Drafted into the US Army, he was stationed in Stuttgart, Germany from 1962 to 1964. He returned to the University of Illinois Urbana-Champaign, studied composition with Salvatore Martirano and composed for the college jazz band led by violist John Garvey. In 1968, Knapp's rotary-valve flugelhorn solos and composition "Medley" were noted at the Collegiate Jazz Festival (CJF). In 1969, Knapp was awarded "Best Composer" by the CJF. He completed his Master of Music in Composition in 1969.

Knapp married dancer Joan Skinner in 1969. Skinner created the Skinner Releasing Technique.

Knapp began teaching at Cornish College of the Arts in Seattle, Washington in 1971, replacing Floyd Standifer who left to teach at Olympic College. Knapp joined Joe Field's chamber jazz ensemble Matrix. In 1977, when Joe Field left Seattle, Knapp renamed the group the Composers and Improvisors Orchestra (CIO) and made it the Cornish group-in-residence for eight years. Guest artists included Gil Evans, Carla Bley, Sam Rivers, and Anthony Braxton. Cornish gained full accreditation in 1977 and Knapp assembled a jazz faculty that included bassist Gary Peacock, vocalist Jay Clayton, drummer Jerry Granelli, saxophonist Denney Goodhew, and trombonist Julian Priester. Knapp retired from Cornish in 2016.

Knapp performed "Atlas Eclipticalis" and "Winter Music" with composer John Cage in 1983.

Knapp won a Fellowship from the National Endowment for the Arts to compose for the CIO in 1984.

Knapp recorded free improvisations on an ECM record titled First Avenue.

== Selected discography ==
With Jim Knapp Orchestra

- On Going Home, (SeaBreeze Jazz, 1996)
- Things for Now, (A-Records, 1999)
- Secular Breathing, (Origin Records, 2003)
- It's not Business, It's Personal, (Origin Records, 2021)

With Scrape

- Approaching Vyones, (Origin Classical, 2013)
