= Sandke =

Sandke is a surname. Notable people with the surname include:

- Jordan Sandke (born c. 1946), American jazz trumpeter, cornetist, and fluegelhornist
- Randy Sandke (born 1949), American jazz trumpeter and guitarist
