= Chuck Wilson (jazz musician) =

American jazz musician

Charles Dee Wilson (July 31, 1948 – October 17, 2018) was an American jazz alto saxophonist.

Born in Wichita Falls, Texas, Wilson began playing saxophone at age 11, and led his own trio while still in high school. He attended North Texas State University and spent much of his career in various big band ensembles. He was with Jerry Gray at the Fairmont Hotel in Dallas around 1972, and following the leader's death in 1976, he played with Buddy Rich from 1977 to 1980. He did much studio work in New York City in the 1980s, on clarinet and flute in addition to saxophone. He played with Tito Puente in 1980–81, Gerry Mulligan from 1981 to 1989, Bob Wilber (1983), Loren Schoenberg (1984), Benny Goodman's last ensemble (1985–86), Buck Clayton (1986–90), and Walt Levinsky. He was with Howard Alden and Dan Barrett's quintet from 1985 to 1991.

He led his own group, Chuck Wilson and Friends, from 1996, which included Murray Wall, Alden, and Joel Helleny as sidemen.

Wilson died on October 16, 2018, at the age of 70 in New York City.

== Discography ==
=== As leader ===
- Echo of Spring (Arbors, 2010)

=== As sideman ===
With Howard Alden & Dan Barrett

- Swing Street (Concord Jazz, 1988)
- The ABQ Salutes Buck Clayton (Concord Jazz, 1989)
- Live in '95 (Arbors, 2004)

With Bob Belden

- Straight to My Heart (Blue Note, 1991)
- Puccini's Turandot (Blue Note, 1993)
- When Doves Cry (Metro Blue, 1994)
- La Cigale (Sunnyside, 1998)

With Buddy Rich

- Class of '78 (Century, 1977)
- Europe 77 (Magic 1993)
- Wham! (Label M, 2000)
- No Funny Hats (Lightyear, 2004)
- Time Out (Lightyear, 2007)
- Birdland (Lightyear, 2015)

With Loren Schoenberg

- Time Waits for No One (Musicmasters, 1987)
- Solid Ground (Musicmasters, 1988)
- Just a-Settin' and a-Rockin ' (Musicmasters, 1990)

With Bobby Short

- Swing That Music (Telarc, 1993)
- Songs of New York (Telarc, 1995)
- How's Your Romance? (Telarc, 1999)

With others

- Dan Barrett, Strictly Instrumental (Concord Jazz, 1987)
- Dan Barrett, Moon Song (Arbors, 1998)
- John Barry, The Cotton Club (Geffen, 1984)
- Ruby Braff, Variety Is the Spice of Braff (Arbors, 2002)
- Canadian Brass, Swingtime! (RCA Victor, 1995)
- Buck Clayton, A Swingin' Dream (Stash, 1989)
- Joey DeFrancesco, Where Were You? (Columbia, 1990)
- Steve Forbert, Lost (Nemperor, 1982)
- Audra McDonald, How Glory Goes (Nonesuch, 2000)
- Geoff Muldaur, Private Astronomy (Edge Music 2003)
- John Pizzarelli, Our Love Is Here to Stay (RCA/BMG, 1997)
- Leon Redbone, Red to Blue (August 1985)
- Leon Redbone, Sugar (Private Music, 1990)
- Randy Sandke, Calling All Cats (Concord Jazz, 1996)
- Randy Sandke, The Re-discovered Louis and Bix (Nagel Heyer, 2000)
- Don Sebesky, I Remember Bill (RCA Victor, 1998)
- Don Sebesky, Joyful Noise (RCA Victor, 1999)
- Andy Stein, Goin' Places (Stomp Off, 1987)
- Mel Torme & Buddy Rich, Together Again for the First Time (Gryphon, 1978)
- Mel Torme & Gerry Mulligan, The Classic Concert Live (Concord Jazz, 2005)
- Warren Vache, Swingtime! (Nagel Heyer, 2000)
- Bob Wilber, Bufadora Blow-up (Arbors, 1997)
