= Release technique =

Dance technique

In dance, release technique is any of various dance techniques that focus on breathing, muscle relaxation, anatomical considerations, and the use of gravity and momentum to facilitate efficient movement. It can be found in modern and postmodern dance, and has been influenced by the work of modern dance pioneers, therapeutic movement techniques such as Skinner Releasing Technique, Feldenkrais and Alexander Technique, and yoga and martial arts.

== History ==
In the late 19th and early 20th centuries dancers began to question the rigidity and formality of classical ballet. Isadora Duncan in particular articulated the need for dance which she described as being connected to the earth, sensuality and the natural body. In pursuit of this goal, pioneers such as Margeret D'Oubler, Martha Graham, Rudolf von Laban and Doris Humphrey began to invent new dance techniques that involved radically different movement.

Elements of release technique began to emerge as these pioneers, and protégés such as Merce Cunningham, José Limón, Irmgard Bartenieff, Erick Hawkins and Anna Halprin, contributed further ideas and inventions. For example, D'Oubler envisioned dance based on scientific analysis of human anatomy and movement; Humphrey's technique focused on allowing gravity and momentum to affect the body; Hawkins advanced the idea that physiologically efficient movement is inherently beautiful. Some elements were the result of exploring other movement disciplines. For example, Hawkins invited proponents of Ideokinesis to teach his dance company, and others were influenced by F.M. Alexander's concepts.

The term "release technique" emerged in the 1970s, predominantly through the work of Mary Fulkerson and Joan Skinner. Modern dancer Joan Skinner synthesised her dance training with principles from the Alexander Technique creating a codified system called "Skinner Releasing Technique". Mary Fulkerson, whose dance technique, which she called Anatomical Release Technique was informed primarily by Mabel Elsworth Todd, Bonnie Bainbridge Cohen and Steve Paxton. Although the names of the two techniques are similar, they developed relatively independently from each other. Through Fulkerson's pedagogical work in Dartington College of Arts, SNDO and Arnhem she established release-based professional dance training in Europe; whereas Skinner's technique has been taken up in Universities in the UK, where Alexander Technique remains the most established Somatic discipline.

It is uncommon for teachers to teach either Anatomical Release Technique, or Skinner Releasing Technique in the form taught by these two women; the principles which led to the development of both techniques predate both Fulkerson and Skinner, and they permeate professional contemporary dance education in a more diffuse way. The nomenclature is their most easily traceable contribution.

== Contemporary technique ==
Today elements of tai chi, yoga, and somatic practices such as the Feldenkrais method can be found in Release Technique. Elements of release technique can be found in contact improvisation. In dance, it is usually taught as an integrated part of contemporary dance classes and, less frequently, in classes that focus on release technique.
