= Made in Brazil =

Made in Brazil may refer to:

- Made in Brazil (album), by Eliane Elias
- Made in Brazil (band)
- Made in Brazil (esports)
