= Joel Helleny =

American jazz musician

Joel Edward Helleny (born October 23, 1956, Paris, Texas d. June 20, 2009, Herrin, Illinois) was an American jazz trombonist.

Helleny learned piano from his mother as a child but settled on trombone by age seven. Although born in Texas he moved to Herrin, Illinois as a child. He attended the University of Illinois before moving to New York City in 1979. There he played with Mel Lewis, Roy Eldridge (1979), and Benny Goodman (1980-82) before returning to Lewis's band in 1983. He was a featured soloist on the soundtrack to the 1984 movie The Cotton Club. He played with the Memphis Nighthawks. He worked with Buck Clayton (1989–90), Jimmy McGriff (1990), George Wein (1990 and subsequently), Frank Wess (1991), Randy Sandke, Warren Vache (1993–95), Kenny Davern (1994), Scott Hamilton (1995), Greg Cohen (1996), and the Keith Ingham/Marty Grosz group Hot Cosmopolites in 1996. He was a member of the New York All-stars in the 1990s. His first release as a leader was 1995's Lip Service, on Arbors Records. Helleny moved back to Herrin in 2007 to care for his elderly father.

== Discography ==
=== As leader ===
- Lip Service (Arbors, 1996)

=== As sideman ===
- Toshiko Akiyoshi, Four Seasons of Morita Village (Novus J/BMG, 1996)
- John Barry, The Cotton Club (Geffen, 1984)
- Greg Cohen, Way Low (DIW, 1996)
- Mary Coughlan, Long Honeymoon (Evangeline, 2001)
- Kenny Davern, East Side, West Side (Arbors, 1994)
- Steve Forbert, Steve Forbert (Epic/Nemperor, 1982)
- Vince Giordano, The Music of the Cotton Club (Sine Qua Non)
- Memphis Nighthawks, Jazz Lips (Delmark, 1977)
- Leon Redbone, Red to Blue (August, 1985)
- Byron Stripling, If I Could Be with You (Nagel Heyer, 2000)
- Randy Sandke, New York Stories (Stash, 1986)
- Randy Sandke, Calling All Cats (Concord Jazz, 1996)
- Scott Hamilton, My Romance (Concord Jazz, 1996)
- Scott Hamilton, Blues, Bop & Ballads (Concord Jazz, 1999)
- Keith Ingham & Marty Grosz, Going Hollywood (Stomp Off, 1997)
- Warren Vaché, Horn of Plenty (Muse, 1994)
- Warren Vache, Talk to Me Baby (Muse, 1996)
- Widespread Jazz Orchestra, Paris Blues (CBS, 1985)
- Chuck Wilson, Echo of Spring (Arbors, 2010)
