= John Garvey (musician) =

American violist, bandleader, and educator (1921–2006)

- Born: John Charles Garvey; March 17, 1921; Canonsburg, Pennsylvania, U.S.
- Died: July 18, 2006 (aged 85) Silver Spring, Maryland, U.S.
- Genres: Chamber music, Jazz, Russian folk music
- Occupations: Musician, academic
- Instrument: Viola
- Years active: 1940s–1990s

John Garvey (March 17, 1921 - July 18, 2006) was an American musician, orchestra leader, and academic who played viola in the Walden String Quartet for 23 seasons, introduced a jazz curriculum at the University of Illinois, and created its Jazz Big Band which he led until his retirement from the university in 1991. The jazz band dominated collegiate jazz festival awards in its early days and in 1969 was chosen by the state department to tour the USSR and Eastern Europe. Many members of Garvey's jazz bands went on to successful careers as professional musicians and academics.

== Early years ==
Inspired by a talk given by the violinist of the Chautauqua Trio, Garvey began studying violin at age 7. By 14 he was commuting from his home in Reading, PA every other week to Temple University in Philadelphia to study violin with Alfred Lorenz,

a violist with the Philadelphia Orchestra He went on to major in music at Temple.

== As a Jobbing Musician ==
After college Garvey played with the Philadelphia Symphony and Columbus Philharmonic. In March 1943, Garvey joined a dance band that played pop-styled classical music led by a classically trained violinist named Jan Savitt, "The Stokowski of Swing". In the summer of 1948 he was director of the summer chamber music program at Ball State University.

== Academia ==
In 1948, Garvey joined the Walden String Quartet in an until-then frequently changing viola chair. He was to remain with the quartet until 1971. The group had recently become quartet-in-residence at the University of Illinois. In addition to touring and recording, the Quartet were members of the music faculty. Garvey was hired as Instructor in the department and within a few years was promoted to Assistant Professor. In May 1952, Garvey became head of the music committee of the university’s Festival of Contemporary Arts. In 1959, he was made a full professor.

=== 1955 Urbana home ===
John and Evelyn Garvey met modernist architect Bruce Goff at the University of Oklahoma when the Walden String Quartet gave a series of concerts there in May 1952, and they soon contracted for Goff to design a home for them. Goff's first design included six spherical rooms connected "via a ramping cooridor enclosed in a transparent tube" but did not include a music performance space which met the Garveys' needs. Further designs followed and the home was built during 1954 and 1955.

== The University Jazz Program ==
Work with Harry Partch on "The Bewitched", a music and dance piece for the 1957 festival, rekindled Garvey's interest in jazz, and for the 1959 festival he invited the Modern Jazz Quartet to play with a student jazz band and a string ensemble.

Because of student interest in continuing the jazz band, Garvey sought funding from the School of Music, but faced strong opposition. By October 1960 he was able to get $150 from the school, and obtained additional money and administrative support from the student union. Garvey and the band made their debut at a routine Thursday morning School of Music function on December 8, 1960. In April 1964, they entered the Collegiate Jazz Festival at Notre Dame University for the first time and took the prize for Best Big Band.

In 1965 and 1966, they were finalists at the festival. and in March 1967, the band won Best Overall Jazz Group. In December 1967, Garvey's band was officially sanctioned by the School of Music.

In 1968, and 1969 they again won "Best Overall Jazz Group", the first ensemble to do so three years in a row. The prize at the 1968 and 1969 festivals was an invitation to perform at the Newport Jazz Festival, for which they received praise from critics Leonard Feather and John S. Wilson.

The 1969 Downbeat Readers Poll ranked the band 16th place in the jazz Big Band category, the only college band in the entire poll.

The accolades led to sponsorship by the US State Department for an eight-week tour of Eastern Europe and Scandinavia in 1968 , and a six-week tour of the Soviet Union in 1969.

By 1970 the School of Music was sponsor of four jazz bands.

Many alumni of Garvey's bands went on to successful careers as musicians and teachers, including Cecil Bridgewater, Dee Dee Bridgewater, Jim McNeely, Ron Dewar, Joel Helleny, and Howie Smith.

== The Russian Folk Orchestra ==
During the tour of the U.S.S.R., Garvey became interested in Russian folk music. Upon returning he found funds through the university to purchase 25 balalaikas, and in 1973 formed the Russian Balalaika Orchestra , soon to be renamed the Russian Folk Orchestra. Garvey led this ensemble for over a decade, touring the U.S and abroad.

== Sound Recordings ==
- Zoltan Kodaly Quartet No 2, Op. 10/Karol Syzmanowski Quartet in C Major, Op 37. The Walden Quartet of the University of Illinois. Lyrichord LP LL 22, 1951. LP, OCLC 28007974
- William Bergsma: String Quartet No. 2. Arthur Shepherd: Triptych for Soprano and String Quartet. Performed By the Walden String Quartet of the University of Illinois. With Marie Kraft, Soprano. American Recording Society ARS-18, 1952.
- Ernest Bloch: Quintet for Piano and Strings. Johana Harris and The Walden String Quartet. MGM Records E3239, 1955. LP, OCLC 3528792
- The Walden Quartet of the University of Illinois, Elliott Carter String Quartet No. 1, Columbia Masterworks ML 5104, 1956, LP, OCLC 2100491.
- Harry Partch: The Bewitched. Recording of first performance at Festival of Contemporary Arts March 26, 1957. Originally released on Partch's own label: Gate 5 Records HP-101 5701.
- Andrew Imbrie, The California String Quartet, The Walden String Quartet – String Quartets 2 And 3, Contemporary Records C6003, 1958.
- The Walden String Quartet, "Charles Ives: Second String Quartet", Folkways FM 3369, 1966.
- Walter Piston / Alan Hovhaness - Earl Wild, The Walden String Quartet / William Masselos, Izler Solomon – Quintet For Piano & Strings / Khaldis: Concerto For Piano, Four Trumpets & Percussion, Heliodor HS-25027, 1966.
- Salvatore Martirano, L's GA - Ballad - Octet, Polydor 24-5001, 1968, LP, OCLC 4669880, Discogs 4489246.
- Orchestra De Jazz A Universitatii Din Illinois, Electrecords EDD 1224, 1968, LP.
- The University Of Illinois Jazz Band In Champaign-Urbana, Century Records, 1968, LP, OCLC 11069493.
- The University Of Illinois Jazz Band In Champaign-Urbana, Century Records, 1968, LP, OCLC 11069493.
- University of Illinois Jazz Band - T-Bird 1968-12-17, amateur live recording, 1968, multiple formats.
- Dixielandová skupina Big bandu University of Illinois USA - Praha 1968, videorecording.
- The University of Illinois Jazz Band in Stockholm, Sweden, Century Records, 1969, LP, OCLC 24483234.
- The University of Illinois Jazz Band and Dixie Band, Century Records, 1969, LP, OCLC 11069451.
- The University of Illinois Jazz Band with Don Smith, Mark Custom Recording Service MC 2944, 1970, LP, OCLC 17211237.
- The University of Illinois Jazz Band and the Hot 7 at CJF, Mark Custom Recording Service, 1970, LP, OCLC 7440049.
- The University of Illinois Jazz Band, John Garvey, conductor, presents the Big Wide World of Jazz, Golden Crest Records CRS 4161, 1977, LP, OCLC 405375.
- Closeout, Dancing Bear Records, 1982, LP, OCLC 19115091
