= Michael Moore (bassist) =

American jazz bassist (born 1945)

Michael Moore (born May 16, 1945 in Glen Este, Ohio, United States) is an American jazz bassist.

Moore started on bass at age fifteen, at Withrow High School in Cincinnati, where he performed in ensembles and the Presentation Orchestra in George G. "Smittie" Smith's Withrow Minstrels. He played with his father in nightclubs in Cincinnati. He attended the Cincinnati College Conservatory, playing with Cal Collins and Woody Evans locally. He toured Africa and Europe with Woody Herman in 1966, and recorded with Dusko Goykovich while in Belgrade.

In the 1970s, he worked with Marian McPartland, Freddie Hubbard, Jim Hall, Jimmy Raney, Bill Evans, Benny Goodman, Jake Hanna, Warren Vache, Herb Ellis, Zoot Sims, Ruby Braff, George Barnes, Chet Baker, and Lee Konitz. In 1978, he auditioned and was hired by Bill Evans after longtime bassist Eddie Gómez had left the group and Evans was in transition with drummer Philly Joe Jones. Moore left after five months due to dissatisfaction with the group. Late in the decade he began working with Gene Bertoncini, with whom he would play into the 1990s. In the 1980s he worked with Sims again and with Kenny Barron and Michael Urbaniak.

Moore was a member of the Dave Brubeck Quartet from 2001 until Brubeck's death in 2012. He nowadays posts videos on his YouTube channel, of him performing a variety of musical pieces.

== Discography ==
=== As leader ===
- Live at Carnegie Hall – 40th Anniversary Concert, Benny Goodman (1978)
- Two in Time (Chiaroscuro, 1989)
- Roger Kellaway meets Gene Bertoncini and Michael Moore (Chiaroscuro, 1992)
- Plays Gershwin (1995)
- Michael Moore / Bill Charlap (Concord Jazz, 1995)
- The Intimacy of the Bass (with Rufus Reid) (Double-Time, 1999)
- The History of Jazz, Vol. 1 (Arbors, 2000)
- The History of Jazz, Vol. 2 (Arbors, 2002)

=== As sideman ===
With Kenny Barron

- 1+1+1 (Blackhawk, 1984 [1986])

With The Ruby Braff-George Barnes Quartet

- The Ruby Braff George Barnes Quartet (Chiaroscuro, 1974)
- Live at the New School (Chiaroscuro, 1974)
- Salutes Rodgers and Hart (Concord Jazz, 1975)
- Plays Gershwin, (Concord Jazz, 1975)
- To Fred Astaire With Love, (Concord Jazz, 1975)

With Bob Brookmeyer

- The Bob Brookmeyer Small Band (Gryphon, 1978)

With Dave Brubeck

- London Flat, London Sharp

With Bill Evans

- Getting Sentimental (rec. live at the Village Vanguard, 1978)

With Gil Evans

- The Gil Evans Orchestra Plays the Music of Jimi Hendrix (RCA, 1974)

With Art Farmer and Jim Hall

- Big Blues (CTI, 1978)

With Jesse Green

- Sea Journey (Chiaroscuro, 1993)

With Lee Konitz

- In Concert (India Navigation, 1974 [1982]) with Chet Baker
- The Lee Konitz Quintet (Chiaroscuro, 1977)
- Tenorlee (Choice, 1978)

With Blue Mitchell

- Many Shades of Blue (Mainstream, 1974)

With Mark Murphy

- Mark II (Muse, 1973)

With Jimmy Raney and Doug Raney

- Stolen Moments (Steeplechase, 1979)

With Joe Temperley

- Just Friends (Hep, 1978) with Jimmy Knepper
- Live at the Floating Jazz Festival (Chiaroscuro, 2000 [2002]) with Kenny Davern

With Warren Vaché

- Blues Walk(Dream Street, 1978)
- Horn of Plenty (Muse, 1994)
- Talk to Me Baby (Muse, 1996)

With Phil Woods and Lew Tabackin

- Phil Woods/Lew Tabackin (Omnisound, 1981)
