= Widespread Depression Orchestra =

The Widespread Depression Orchestra was a nine-piece jazz ensemble founded in 1972 at Vermont's Marlboro College.

Initially, the group played 1950s style R&B and early rock and roll with guitars, piano, sax, bass guitar, drums, and a vocalist, but by the middle of the 1970s was operating as a big band revival group, in the style of the bands of Jimmie Lunceford, Count Basie, Duke Ellington, and Lionel Hampton. The unit moved to New York City in 1978 under the leadership of Jon Holtzman, when it recorded the first of several full-length albums. In 1980 five of its members also played on their own as a bebop group.

Holtzman, better known as The Bronx Nightingale, left the group around 1982 to start his own band and recorded his first solo album - Let's Do It. John Hammond Sr., a big fan of Jon's, graciously volunteered to write the liner notes. After Holtzman left Michael Hashim, the group's alto saxophonist, was named leader, and the musicians broadened their repertory to include swing and bop, featuring original arrangements by band members. Manager Michael Caplin renamed the group the Widespread Jazz Orchestra. WJO played at premier jazz clubs across America and around the world, and appeared at major music festivals including North Sea, Pori, Antibes, New Orleans, Montreal, Montreux + Taormina. Their 1985 Columbia Records album Paris Blues, was produced by Dr. George Butler.

== Discography ==
Widespread Depression Orchestra

- Downtown Uproar, Stash (1979); OCLC 6360561 (Note: Downtown Uproar — Jordan Sandke, Atherton, Hashim, Nicyper, Little, Holtzman, LeDonne, Flanigan, Ellis)
- Boogie in the Barnyard, Stash (1980); OCLC 8007049 (Note: Boogie in the Barnyard — Conway replaces Flanigan)
- Rockin' in Rhythm, Phontastic (nl) (Swd) PHONT 7527 (1980); OCLC 16909745 (Note: Rockin' in Rhythm — Jordan Sandke, Atherton, Wilber, Hashim, Nicyper, Lillie, Holtzman, LeDonne, Conway, Ellis)
- Time to Jump and Shout, Stash ST 212 (1981); OCLC 8246038 (Note: Time to Jump and Shout — same except Nicyper)

Widespread Jazz Orchestra

- Swing is the Thing, Adelphi AD 5015 (1982); OCLC 9797724 (Note: Swing is the Thing — Grey, Jordan Sandke, Masters, Hashim, Shull, Lillie, Gerson, Conway, Ellis)
- Paris Blues, Columbia Col FC 40034 (1984); OCLC 12400344 (Note: Paris Blues — Jordan Sandke, Randy Sandke, Helleny, Hashim, Shull, Lillie, LeDonne, Minkler, Braugham, Wells, Ellis, Ecklund, Dwight)

== Members ==
At large

1. Jordan Sandke, trumpet
2. Tim Atherton, trombone
3. Michael Hashim, soprano and alto sax, leader (1982 onwards)
4. Dean Nicyper, tenor sax
5. David Lillie, baritone sax
6. Patrick Baron, piano
7. Mike LeDonne, piano
8. Roy Gerson, piano
9. James Wimpfheimer, double bass
10. Bill Conway, double bass
11. Mark Minkler, double bass
12. Bill Eldridge, drums
13. John Ellis, drums, arrangement
14. Charlie Braugham, drums
15. Jon Holtzman, vocals, vibraphone, drums, leader (to 1982)
16. Dan Barrett, trombone
17. Tad Shull (de) (born 1955), tenor Sax
18. Ronnie Wells, vocals
19. Judy Niemack, vocals
20. Bob Zuck, guitar, vocals
21. Jeanne Holtzman, bass, vocals
22. Nick McDougal, alto sax, guitar
23. Diego Francesco Donaldo Bianco, tenor sax
24. Michael Caplin, manager
25. Paul Suihkonen, trumpet
26. Jake Epstein, clarinet, sax, arranger
27. Billy Grey, trumpet, vocals
28. Jim Masters, trombone, vocals
29. Randy Sandke, trumpet
30. Joel Helleny, trombone
31. Peter Ecklund, arranger
32. John Dwight, arranger

By record
