= String Quartet No. 2 (Ives) =

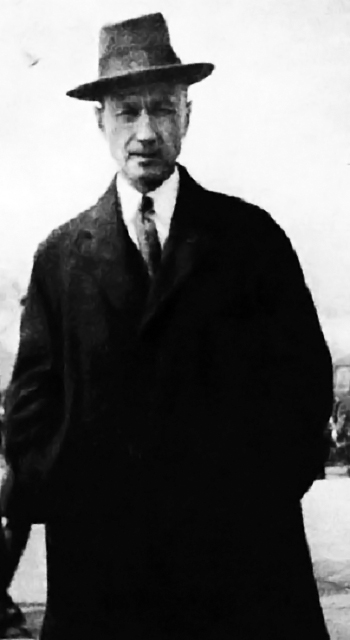
Charles Ives c. 1913

The String Quartet No. 2 by Charles Ives is a work for string quartet written between 1907 and 1913. It was premiered at McMillin Theatre, Columbia University in New York City on 11 May 1946, by a Juilliard School student ensemble. Its first professional performance was by the Walden String Quartet, on 15 September 1946, at Yaddo, on a concert which prompted composer Lou Harrison to write: "This work is... the finest piece of American chamber music yet... Music of this kind happens only every fifty years or a century, so rich in faith and so full of the sense of completion." In his Memos, Ives referred to the quartet as "one of the best things I have".

The quartet was first published in 1954 by Peer International, and was reprinted in 1970 with corrections by John Kirkpatrick. In 2016, Peermusic Classical published a critical edition of the quartet, commissioned by the Charles Ives Society and edited by Malcolm Goldstein.

== Program ==
The quartet is a programmatic work depicting four men who "converse, discuss, argue (in re 'Politick'), fight, shake hands, shut up – then walk up the mountain side to view the firmament!" Author Matthew McDonald wrote that the quartet "is the only multi-movement work Ives completed after The Celestial Country... whose movements all belong to an 'original grand conception,' as opposed to being partially or completely culled from earlier pieces," and that "Ives conceived of the quartet movements as integrated components of a single musical narrative." According to music historian and theorist Robert P. Morgan, the quartet "reveals a radical departure from traditional quartet writing. In keeping with the dramatic conception suggested by the titles of the movements, Ives treats the four instruments with an unprecedented degree of individuality: each has its own special character, and the overall quality of the work results from a sort of forced amalgamation of the four different textural components."

As characteristic of Ives' style, he quotes many American tunes, including "Dixie's Land", "Marching Through Georgia", "Turkey in the Straw", "Columbia, the Gem of the Ocean", "Massa in De Cold Ground", "Bethany", "Nettleton", and "Westminster Chimes", alongside quotations from works of Tchaikovsky, Brahms, and even Beethoven's "Ode to Joy" theme.

== Music ==
The work is in three movements:

1. Discussions (Andante moderato—Andante con spirito—Adagio molto)
2. Arguments (Allegro con spirito)
3. The Call of the Mountains (Adagio—Andante—Adagio)

=== I. Discussions ===
The first movement, begins quietly but soon becomes agitated, playing off one instrument against another. Jan Swafford wrote that "In this movement the programmatic idea of a heated conversation is rendered by complex, chromatic, dissonant counterpoint. The lines, modeled on speech, tend to sound like conversation. Periodically the instruments join in rhythmic unison, representing points of agreement in the discussion. Otherwise the four voices are distinct in a more traditionally contrapuntal way, the mostly atonal harmonies producing a sonority close to what Schoenberg was developing during the same period, a continent away." After a climactic outburst, "serious discussion is again resumed, and eventually the movement ends much as it began". (In the manuscript, Ives notes "Enough discussion for us!" at the movement's conclusion.)

=== II. Arguments ===
According to Morgan, the second movement, is "one of Ives's most original conceptions". It starts out with the instruments gruffly and loudly asserting themselves one by one, and soon each instrument establishes its own distinctive musical and expressive "vocabulary". This culminates in a passage during which the violins play in 4/4 time while the viola and cello play in 3/8, followed by a role reversal, with the violins playing in 3/8 and the others in 4/4. All the instruments then resume playing in 2/4 time, but this is interrupted by a clichéd, sentimental, overtly tonal cadenza marked "Andante Emasculata" played by the second violin, during which it attempts to "establish 'traditional' musical order amongst the aggressively heterogeneous parts." (Here the second violin represents "Rollo", a fictitious character who "represented all that was safe, conservative, and thus reprehensible in music". The manuscript states "Nice and pretty, Rollo" at this point.)

The other three instruments respond with a dissonant fff passage marked "Allegro con fisto," recalling the opening of the movement. This is followed by another "Andante Emasculata" cadenza by the second violin, to which the others respond in a similarly brusque manner. After a quiet passage marked "Largo sweetota" and another outburst, there is a loud, dense section, after which the second violin drops out, only to return, insistently playing exaggeratedly regular rhythms against the other instruments' constantly-changing subdivisions. The instruments briefly come together, playing in rhythmic unison, but things soon fall apart in a passage marked "Allegro con fuoco (all mad)" that again recalls the opening. The instruments again attempt to unite, but lapse into dissonant outbursts as before.

Finally, following a C-major passage played in rhythmic unison, there is a brief, quiet, open-string pause for breath marked "Andante con scratchy (as tuning up)", followed by a final fff eruption marked "Allegro con fistiswatto (as a K.O.)".

=== III. The Call of the Mountains ===
According to McDonald, the final movement is "music that epitomizes Ives's transcendental ideal of unity in diversity, four musical layers that are rhythmically and melodically independent but together forge a continuous tonality that evokes timelessness and eternity." He suggests that "the apotheosis of 'The Call of the Mountains' is Ives’s own music of the future."

In keeping with the program ("walking up the mountain side to view the firmament"), the instruments slowly unite in their efforts to achieve their goal, culminating in a "transcendental" ostinato passage during which the cello plays a slow, majestic descending whole-tone scale beginning and ending on D, strongly reminiscent of the ending of the last movement of Ives' Symphony No. 4, completed several years after the composition of the quartet. Jan Swafford described the ending as follows: "Over a downstriding whole-tone scale in the cello, the violins and viola chime like great bells in the heavens, in patterns like bell ringing. The struggle and the arguments have prepared the way for a revelation." McDonald wrote:

The communal act with which the program ends is signified by the balance between instrumental independence and cohesion. The four debaters maintain their individuality yet form some sort of consensus as a means of peaceful coexistence; the opposition between individual and community is resolved. The four men’s communion with nature on the mountaintop is evoked by the first violin, which reaches higher on its E-string than most composers or players of the time would have dared to attempt, as it paraphrases the hymn 'Nearer, My God, to Thee'..., the title suggesting the ultimate object of the ascent up the mountain. God's eternity is rendered by the circularity of each of the lower three instrumental layers, whose ostinati repeat at different periodicities.

== Influence ==
Dörte Schmidt has noted that the "formal dramaturgy" of Elliott Carter's String Quartet No. 2 was inspired by Ives' quartet, and wrote that Carter established the use of highly individual instrumental characteristics as "the point of departure for the form of his Second Quartet, in which two types of interaction can be traced through the nine formal units lasting only about twenty minutes in total: egalitarian cooperation and dominance or confrontation." (Carter helped organize the 1946 all-Ives concert that featured the premiere of the quartet, as well as the premieres of The Unanswered Question and Central Park in the Dark.)

Robert Moevs suggested that Carter's String Quartet No. 3 is also indebted to "...the unreconstructedly dissonant superpositions of Charles Ives. To him may be due the very premise of this quartet elsewhere, that of separate groups on either side, playing at the same time their own music at their own tempo." Moevs wrote that "the concept of dramatis personae, individuals of differing character whose nature and conflicts generate respectively the material and the structure, lies at the origin of" Ives' second quartet, and goes on to list specific passages in the Ives quartet in terms of their commonalities with Carter's work, such as "the division into Duos with conflicting meters," "a protest of first violin, viola and cello against the sentimentalism of the second violin (opposition of character), and "conflicting beat subdivision... against a steady pulse." Moevs noted that "what in Ives was defiant, sometimes outrageously incongruous, is in Carter tamed and exploited by professional system".

Although he did not draw explicit parallels with Ives' quartet, Robert Hurwitz noted that Carter's second and third quartets "can... be heard in terms of the anthropomorphism of the instruments," stating how, in the second quartet, "the viola plays... an expressive, almost lamentable cadenza to be confronted with explosions of what may be anger or ridicule by the other three" (similar to the Arguments movement of Ives' quartet) and suggesting that Carter's "Third Quartet can be heard as a play, or a debate, or a conversation."

Brian Ferneyhough wrote the following regarding the final movement of his own String Quartet No. 4: "The 'story-line' of the four instruments is perhaps comparable to Charles Ives' String Quartet No. 2, where everyone is evolving, complaining or being boring in his own inimitable fashion." A passage in Ferneyhough's Sixth String Quartet is marked "testardamente (with great difficulty, like climbing a mountain)". In the documentation accompanying a video recording of a rehearsal of the Sixth Quartet, Ferneyhough stated: "the string quartet right from the beginning was always a... subtle medium for the expression of social relationships... The old image of... four civilized people talking to each other in terms that would not have been unfamiliar to philosophers of the Enlightenment. And whilst that of course is somewhat absurd from the present-day standpoint, and indeed was turned on its head by Charles Ives who had four very irascible characters climbing a mountain and shrieking at each other... It does seem to me there is something about the quartet which is inherently imbricated with what we understand human relationships to be on a highly evolved level."
