= Memphis Nighthawks =

American trad jazz band in Champaign, Illinois (1970s)

Memphis Nighthawks were a traditional jazz band based in Champaign, Illinois during the 1970s.

== History ==
Founded and led by Ron Dewar, from the School of Music at the University of Illinois, the Nighthawks performed compositions from the early days of jazz.

The band members were university music students, for the most part. Under saxophonist Dewar's direction they brought to pre-1930 jazz compositions a precision born of studying classical and modern orchestral music. They achieved a discipline that, combined with their youthful enthusiasm, distinguished them from the far looser, laid-back style of traditional jazz bands labeled as Dixieland.

One distinctive aspect of their style was the use of a bass saxophone instead of a string double bass to anchor the band's rhythm section. In this, and in their name, the Memphis Nighthawks prefigured the later Nighthawks Orchestra of New York City, led by Vince Giordano.

Personnel included Dewar on soprano saxophone and clarinet, Steve Jensen on cornet, Joel Helleny on trombone, Dave Feinman on the above-mentioned bass sax, Mike Miller on banjo and guitar and sometimes Bob Kornacher on drums.

Recordings included the albums Jazz Lips on the Delmark label and Live at the Stabilizer on Golden Crest. Delmark Records released Jazz Lips for the first time on CD in November 2009. Previously unissued takes are included.

Dewar now plays and teaches in Chicago. Miller was an active guitar and banjo player in Champaign, Illinois and died in March 2023. Jensen died in July 1997. Feinman plays guitar and bass guitar and lives in Long Island, New York. Kornacher is in St.Louis and Helleny died in September 2009. Guy Senese, who played the first year as the guitar/banjoist, is a charter member of the Memphis Nighthawks. After leaving the band he moved to Alaska, where he taught himself cornet. He now lives in Phoenix, Arizona, and plays a cornet left to him by Ed "Doc" Kittrell, who was an inspiration to the Memphis Nighthawks.
