= Lyambiko =

German jazz singer

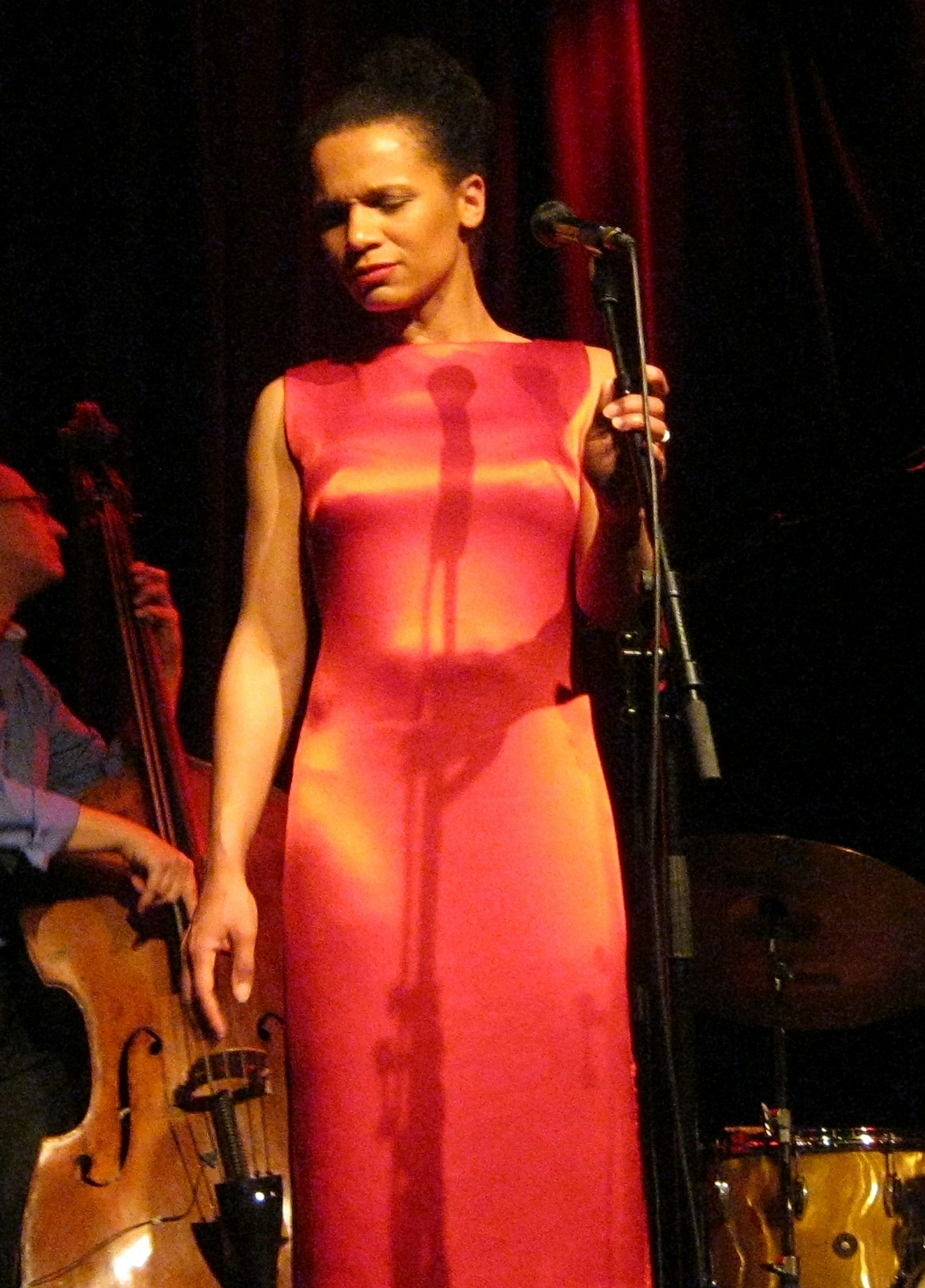
Lyambiko in 2012

Lyambiko (born Sandy Müller; 1978) is a German jazz singer. She has released five charting albums in Germany.

== Life and work ==
Lyambiko, whose stage name is the last name of her father, was born in Tanzania, and grew up in a musically active family. Her grandfather was already a member of a jazz combo in the 1930s and her father worked as a singer in both the church choir and in jazz and in world music bands. At the age of 17 Lyambiko founded her first band as a singer (folk, pop, blues) and participated as the youngest participant in a band contest, where she won her first studio recording.

After a long musical break, Lyambiko moved to Berlin in 1999. As part of the preparation for the entrance exam to the Hochschule für Musik, she received singing and piano lessons and developed a small repertoire of jazz standards. This was followed by the first concerts in Berlin jazz clubs with various lineups and a regular engagement "Lyambiko - Strange Fruit" in a duo with guitar. Lyambiko was given the opportunity to perform at the renowned Berlin jazz club A-Trane in April 2000.

From April 2001, the quartet of the same name was named after Lyambiko, with whom she expanded her concert activities to Germany, and later also to neighboring European countries and the United States.

In addition to her jazz projects, the singer first worked on a program of African music with a children's and youth choir in 2007.

Nationally, "Singer of the Year" Lyambiko won the Echo Jazz 2011 with "Something Like Reality".

== Lyambiko (band) ==
The band of the same name originally consisted of American pianist Marque Lowenthal, Canadian bassist Robin Draganic, German drummer Torsten Zwingenberger, and Lyambiko. They had their first appearance in April 2001 and have been on tour at home and abroad ever since. They play swing, Latin and soul jazz, including many standards.

The first two albums were released by the Hamburg jazz label Nagel Heyer Records, after which they switched to Sony BMG. The album Shades of Delight reached number 2 on the German jazz charts. The albums Lyambiko—a collection of flattering jazz standards—and Love… And Then were each awarded a jazz award by the German Phonover Association. In February 2007, the album Inner Sense was released, to which Lyambiko contributed two songs of its own for the first time. In addition to two cover versions from pop / rock music, it only contains original compositions. The album Saffronia is a tribute to Nina Simone.

Reviewing Shades of Delight in July 2004, The Village Voice critic Tom Hull said, "She's an Afro-German who sings perfectly nuanced English. They're an eponymous band of determinedly optimistic Übermenschen. Together they demonstrate their taste and smarts many times over."

== Discography ==
- Out of This Mood (2002)
- Shades of Delight (2003)
- Lyambiko (2005) (GER: Gold in jazz); GER #91
- Love ... And Then (2006) (GER: Gold in jazz); GER #78
- Inner Sense (2007) (GER: Gold in jazz); GER #89
- Saffronia (2008) GER #57
- Something Like Reality (2010)
- Lyambiko Sings Gershwin (2012) GER #78
- Muse (2015)
- Love Letters (2017)
- Berlin - New York (2019)
