= Rhythm Is Our Business =

Studio album by Jordan Sandke
- Recorded: June 10 and 12, 1985
- Studio: ERAS Recording, New York City, U.S.
- Genre: Jazz
- Label: Stash

Rhythm Is Our Business is an album by trumpeter and cornetist Jordan Sandke, recorded in 1985.

== Recording and music ==
Rhythm Is Our Business was recorded at ERAS Recording, New York City, on June 10 and 12, 1985. Sandke plays trumpet and cornet on the album, with Tad Shull (tenor sax), Jaki Byard (piano), Milt Hinton (bass), and Charlie Braugham (drums). The material is some Sandke originals and compositions by other writers.

== Release ==
The album was released on LP by Stash Records.

== Track listing ==
1. "Oyster Marmalade" (Jordan Sandke) – 3:55
2. "Black Beauty" (Duke Ellington) – 3:08
3. "Nostalgia" (Fats Navarro) – 5:45
4. "Rhythm Is Our Business" (Sammy Cahn, Saul Chaplin, Jimmie Lunceford) – 4:15
5. "Hog-Step" (Sandke) – 4:48
6. "Cornet Chop Suey" (Louis Armstrong) – 4:12
7. "Don't Take Your Love from Me" (Henry Nemo) – 4:20
8. "Forty-Third and Pluto" (Sandke) – 3:35

== Personnel ==
- Jordan Sandke – trumpet (tracks 1, 3–5, 7, 8), cornet (tracks 2, 6)
- Tad Shull – tenor sax
- Jaki Byard – piano
- Milt Hinton – bass
- Charlie Braugham – drums
