= Horn of Plenty (Warren Vaché album) =

Studio album by Warren Vaché
- Released: 1994
- Recorded: September 8 and October 5, 1993
- Studio: Van Gelder Studio, Englewood Cliffs, NJ
- Genre: Jazz
- Length: 57:35
- Label: Muse; MCD 5524
- Producer: Don Sickler

Warren Vaché chronology
Warm Evenings (1989)	Horn of Plenty (1994)	Talk to Me Baby (1996)

Horn of Plenty is an album by cornetist Warren Vaché which was recorded in 1993 and released on the Muse label the following year.

== Reception ==
Professional ratings
Review scores
Source	Rating
AllMusic	4.5/5 stars

The AllMusic review by Scott Yanow stated "Warren Vache is in excellent form throughout this interesting set ... Throughout, Vache is heard at the top of his game, adding a swing sensibility to music ranging from dixieland to hard bop. Recommended".

== Track listing ==
1. "Eternal Triangle" (Sonny Stitt) – 4:44
2. "Struttin' with Some Barbecue" (Lil Hardin, Don Raye) – 6:08
3. "Long Ago (and Far Away)" (Jerome Kern, Ira Gershwin) – 7:57
4. "Nancy's Fancy" (Buck Clayton) – 3:52
5. "All Blues" (Miles Davis) – 6:02
6. "Bix Fix" (Joe Puma) – 5:08
7. "Joy Spring" (Clifford Brown) – 5:21
8. "Buddy Bolden's Blues" (Jelly Roll Morton) – 2:49
9. "Swing Samba" (Puma) – 5:36
10. "I Can't Get Started" (Vernon Duke, Ira Gershwin) – 6:32
11. "Liza (All the Clouds'll Roll Away)" (George Gershwin, Ira Gershwin, Gus Kahn) – 3:26

== Personnel ==
- Warren Vaché – cornet
- Houston Person – tenor saxophone (tracks 1, 2, 5 & 7)
- Joe Puma – guitar (track 8)
- Joel Helleny – trombone (tracks 1, 2, 5, 9 & 11)
- Richard Wyands – piano (tracks 1–5, 7 & 9–11)
- Michael Moore – bass (tracks 1–5 & 7–11)
- Billy Hart – drums (tracks 1–5, 7 & 9–11)
