= Talk to Me Baby (album) =

Studio album by Warren Vaché
- Released: 1996
- Recorded: June 6, 1995
- Studio: Van Gelder Studio, Englewood Cliffs, NJ
- Genre: Jazz
- Length: 56:29
- Label: Muse; MCD 5547
- Producer: Don Sickler

Warren Vaché chronology
Horn of Plenty (1994)	Talk to Me Baby (1996)	Warren Plays Warren (1997)

Talk to Me Baby is an album by trumpeter Warren Vaché which was recorded in 1995 and released on the Muse label the following year.

== Reception ==
Professional ratings
Review scores
Source	Rating
AllMusic	4.5/5 stars

The AllMusic review by Scott Yanow stated "This Warren Vache CD is a bit unusual, for it features the trumpeter, best known for his work in the mainstream and small-group swing field, playing quite a few selections that fall stylistically into bop and hard bop ... No matter how complex the piece, Vache plays throughout in prime form, showing that he could be one of the top latter-day beboppers if that were his main goal".

== Track listing ==
1. "On Y Va (Off We Go)" (Warren Vaché) – 4:14
2. "The Arrival" (Horace Parlan) – 6:36
3. "You'll Never Know" (Harry Warren, Mack Gordon) – 4:46
4. "The Eels Nephew" (Bud Freeman) – 4:16
5. "Stranger in Paradise" (George Forrest, Robert Wright) – 5:52
6. "Polka Dots and Moonbeams" (Jimmy Van Heusen, Johnny Burke) – 4:51
7. "Says You" (Sam Jones) – 5:34
8. "Talk to Me Baby" (Robert Dolan, Johnny Mercer) – 4:59
9. "Isfahan" (Billy Strayhorn) – 5:00
10. "Pick Yourself Up" (Jerome Kern, Dorothy Fields) – 3:48
11. "The Claw" (Flip Phillips) – 6:33

== Personnel ==
- Warren Vaché – trumpet
- Bill Easley – saxophone
- Howard Alden – guitar
- Joel Helleny – trombone
- Richard Wyands – piano
- Michael Moore – bass
- Alvin Queen – drums
