= Spanky Davis =

- Born: Ronald J. Davis; March 6, 1943; Indianapolis, Indiana
- Died: October 23, 2014 (aged 71) Manahawkin, New Jersey
- Genres: Jazz
- Occupation: Musician
- Instrument: Trumpet
- Years active: 1979–2004
- Labels: Arbors, Challenge
- Formerly of: Benny Goodman, Roy Eldridge, Walt Levinsky, Buddy Tate

Ronald J. "Spanky" Davis (March 6, 1943 – October 23, 2014) was an American jazz trumpeter.

== Career ==
Davis worked with Charlie Palmieri (1979), Sam Jones (1979–82), Machito (1980–81), and Benny Goodman (1982–83). He toured Ireland with Al Cohn in 1983–84, then played with Bob Haggart in 1984–85. Concurrently, he led the house band at Jimmy Ryan's in New York City from 1980, following Roy Eldridge in this position. Jimmy Ryan's closed in 1983, but Davis continued to lead this band in other performances as Jimmy Ryan's All-Stars; this ensemble continued to be active into the late 1990s and counted among its sidemen Ted Sturgis, Joe Muranyi, and Eddie Locke. Davis led a quartet with Locke, Richard Wyands, and Murray Wall from 1986, in addition to playing with the Savoy Sultans from 1984 to 1991. In the mid-1980s he did work with Arvell Shaw as part of Armstrong Legacy. He played as a sideman with Buck Clayton from 1986 to 1992 and toured with Buddy Tate between 1986 and 1990; he also accompanied Ruth Brown in 1989, Annie Ross in 1991–92 and Frank Sinatra in 1991–93. From 1997 he played in Chuck Folds's group at Sweet Basil in New York.

== Discography ==
- Dan Barrett, Rebecca Kilgore, Being a Bear (Arbors, 2000)
- Ruth Brown, Blues On Broadway (Fantasy, 1989)
- Buck Clayton, A Swingin' Dream (Stash, 1989)
- Joey DeFrancesco, Where Were You? (Columbia, 1990)
- Chuck Folds, Remember Doc Cheatham (Arbors, 2000)
- Panama Francis, Everything Swings (Squatty Roo, 2016)
- Sam Jones, Something New (Interplay, 1979)
- Walt Levinsky, A Big Band Tribute to Benny Goodman (Kenzo, 1989)
- Dick Meldonian-Sonny Igoe, The Jersey Swing Concerts (Progressive, 1982)
- Dick Meldonian-Sonny Igoe, Plays Gene Roland Music (Progressive, 1983)
- Butch Miles, Introducing the Ivory Coast Suite (Dreamstreet, 1986)
