= Mary Fulkerson =

American dance teacher and choreographer (1946–2020)

Mary O'Donnell Fulkerson (1946–2020) was an American dance teacher and choreographer. Born in the United States, she developed an approach to expressive human movement called 'Anatomical Release Technique' in the US and UK, which has influenced the practice of dance movement therapy, as seen in the clinical work of Bonnie Meekums, postmodern dance, as exemplified by the choreography of Kevin Finnan, and the application of guided meditation and guided imagery, as seen in the psychotherapeutic work of Paul Newham.

== Work ==
Fulkerson's primary contribution to dance, dance therapy, and guided meditation derives from the way she taught dancers and non-dancers how to use their own mental imagery to motivate expressive movement, which she developed upon the principles and practices previously established by Mabel Todd, Barbara Clark, Lulu Sweigard, and Joan Skinner, evolving her main teachings at Dartington College of Arts between 1973 and 1985.

These teachers developed an approach to rehabilitative physical education, choreography, and improvised dance that had in common the facilitation of healthy and expressive movement through volitional use of imagination, which involved visualizing the structure and motion of the body, and allowing this kinaesthetic imagery to inform the way they moved. The term 'ideokinesis' denotes use of such imagery to rehabilitate and precipitate human movement, which Sweigard borrowed from the American piano teacher Bonpensière, who used imagery in his music teaching, and invented the word by combining two words derivative of Greek: 'ideo' for idea or thought, and 'kinesis' for movement.

Fulkerson initiated two developments in the work established by her predecessors. Firstly, she extended the type of imagery used by her students and dancers in both choreographed and improvised dance beyond the anatomical and kinesthetic. This enabled her students and dancers to physicalize and embody a range of images, including entities, animals, and characters. Secondly, she prepared her dancers and students for practice, rehearsal, and performance using a technique comparable to guided meditation, guided imagery, and creative visualization, verbally suggesting images as the members of her ensemble or class lay still, becoming increasingly aware of their body prior to initiating movement. As a consequence, Fulkerson's approach to dance education has been described as a form of movement meditation.

In 1989, Fulkerson co-founded the Center for New Dance Development (Dutch "Centrum voor Nieuwe Dans Ontwikkeling", CNDO) later renamed European Dance Development Center (EDDC) with Aat Hougée in Arnhem, the Netherlands, after a split from the earlier established School for New Dance Development in Amsterdam. The school continued to operate until it was made part of ArtEZ Dansacademie Arnhem, and fully merged with the former in 2002.
