= Michael Hashim =

American musician

Michael James Hashim (April 9, 1956, Geneva, New York) is an American jazz alto and soprano saxophonist.

Hashim began playing saxophone while in elementary school, playing with Phil Flanigan and Chris Flory as a high schooler. He worked with both into the middle 1970s, and in 1976 he toured with Muddy Waters and played with the Widespread Depression Orchestra, which we would later lead. He also formed his own quartet in 1979, which has included Dennis Irwin, Kenny Washington, and Mike LeDonne as sidemen. In 1980 he toured with Clarence Gatemouth Brown.

Hashim played in New York City in the early 1980s with Roy Eldridge, Jo Jones, Brooks Kerr, Sonny Greer, and Jimmie Rowles. From 1987 he worked often with Judy Carmichael. He toured China in 1992, and was one of the first jazz musicians ever to do so. He worked with Flory through the 1990s, and toured in North America and Europe regularly. In 1990 with his quartet he recorded Lotus Blossom, an album of Billy Strayhorn songs. In 1998 expanded this ensemble into 11 members as the Billy Strayhorn Orchestra.

Since 1999 he has been a member of the Raymond Scott Orchestrette. He has also been a mainstay in the George Gee Orchestra.

In addition to his recording dates as a leader, he has performed on over 100 sessions as a sideman.

Since 2007, he has performed with The Microscopic Septet.

== Discography ==
- Peacocks (Stash, 1983)
- Lotus Blossom (Stash, 1990)
- A Blue Streak (Stash, 1991)
- Guys and Dolls (Stash, 1992)
- Transatlantic Airs (33 Jazz 1994)
- Keep a Song in Your Soul (Hep, 1996)
- Multicolored Blue (Hep, 1999)
- Green Up Time: The Music of Kurt Weill (Hep, 2001)
