= Where Were You? =

Studio album by Joey DeFrancesco
- Released: 1990
- Recorded: February 27, 1990
- Studio: Van Gelder Studio, Englewood Cliffs, NJ
- Genre: Jazz
- Length: 59:25
- Label: Columbia
- Producer: Horace Ott

Joey DeFrancesco chronology
| All of Me (1989) | Where Were You? (1990) | Part III (1991) |

Professional ratings
Review scores
| Source | Rating |
|---|---|
| Allmusic | 4/5 stars |

Where Were You? is the second album led by jazz organist Joey DeFrancesco which was released on the Columbia label in 1990.

== Reception ==
The Allmusic review by Scott Yanow states "On his second recording, organist Joey DeFrancesco is heard in settings ranging from a quartet to a large orchestra. Although he is generally the main star, DeFrancesco welcomes such guests as tenors Illinois Jacquet and Kirk Whalum and guitarist John Scofield. DeFrancesco holds his own and is in top form".

== Track listing ==
All compositions by Joey DeFrancesco except where noted

1. "I'll Always Love You" (Jimmy George) – 8:30
2. "Red Top" (Lionel Hampton, Ben Kynard) – 7:32
3. "Teach Me Tonight" (Gene De Paul, Sammy Cahn) – 4:38
4. "Song for My Mother" – 6:25
5. "Where Were You" – 6:54
6. "Georgia on My Mind" (Hoagy Carmichael, Stuart Gorrell) – 4:59
7. "Lights Camera Action" – 3:08
8. "But Not for Me" (George Gershwin, Ira Gershwin) – 7:33
9. "I Thought About You" (Jimmy Van Heusen with lyrics by Johnny Mercer) – 5:22
10. "Love Attack" (Horace Ott) – 4:34

== Personnel ==
- Joey DeFrancesco – Hammond C3, Steinway piano, Ensoniq EPS, Ensoniq EPS-M, Ensoniq SQ-80, Ensoniq VFX
- Art Baron (track 9), Virgil Jones (tracks 3, 6, 7 & 10), Wallace Roney (tracks 3, 6, 7 & 10) – trumpet
- Spanky Davis, Victor Paz – trumpet, flugelhorn (tracks 3, 6, 7, 9 & 10)
- Warren Cavington, Dick Griffin, Grover Mitchell – trombone (tracks 3, 6, 7, 9 & 10)
- Garfield Fobbs – bass trombone (tracks 3, 6, 7, 9 & 10)
- Harvey Estrin – flute, piccolo (tracks 4, 6 & 9)
- Billy Kerr – flute, alto flute, piccolo (tracks 4, 6 & 9)
- Phil Bodner – oboe, flute (tracks 4, 6 & 9)
- Kirk Whalum – soprano saxophone, tenor saxophone (tracks 2, 4 & 5)
- Chuck Wilson, Jerome Richardson – alto saxophone (tracks 3, 6, 7, 9 & 10)
- Bill Easley (tracks 3, 6, 7, 9 & 10), Patience Higgins (tracks 3, 6 & 7), Illinois Jacquet (tracks 2 & 8) – tenor saxophone
- Babe Clark – baritone saxophone (tracks 3, 6, 7, 9 & 10)
- John Campo – bassoon, flute (tracks 4, 6 & 9)
- John Scofield – guitar (track 1)
- Lou Volpe – rhythm guitar, guitar
- Milt Hinton – bass (tracks 3, 6 & 9)
- Wilbur Bascomb – bass, Fender bass (tracks 7 & 10)
- Billy Hart (tracks 3, 6 & 9), Eugene Jackson (tracks 1, 2, 4, 5 & 8), Dennis Mackrel (tracks 7 & 10) – drums
- Sammy Figueroa (tracks 1–4 & 6–10), Steve Thornton (track 5) – percussion
