= Nagel-Heyer Records =

German jazz record label

- Founded: 1992
- Founder: Hans and Sabine Nagel-Heyer
- Distributor: Allegro
- Genre: Jazz
- Country of origin: Germany
- Location: Hamburg
- Official website: www.nagelheyer.de

Nagel-Heyer Records is a German jazz record label based in Hamburg.

Nagel-Heyer was founded in 1992 by Hans and Sabine Nagel-Heyer to issue primarily live recordings of both North American and European jazz performers. In 1998, Nagel-Heyer was named Record Label of the Year by Jazz Journal International. By 2004, it had released nearly 200 albums.

== History ==
Sabine Nagel-Heyer managed a twenty-four hour jazz station in Germany. She and her husband, Hans, attended a concert in Bremen, Germany, by a group that included Kenny Davern, Eddie Higgins, George Masso, Danny Moss, and Randy Sandke. The promoter, Manfred Selchow, persuaded the couple to sponsor a concert in Hamburg on September 26, 1992, George Gershwin's birthday. The concert was recorded under the title the Wonderful World of George Gershwin, and when it was broadcast on the station, listeners wanted to buy a copy.

The German government warned that the station's dwindling profits could lead to the loss of its license. The format was changed so that jazz aired only once a week, giving Sabine Nagel-Heyer time to concentrate on more live recordings. By 1994, the label released a new live concert every month. Nagel-Heyer concentrates on live recordings of mainstream jazz, sing, and Dixieland. The label's roster includes Harry Allen, Wycliffe Gordon, Byron Stripling, Donald Harrison, Ken Peplowski, and Randy Sandke.

== Artists ==
- Howard Alden
- Harry Allen
- Alan Barnes
- Ruby Braff
- Bill Charlap
- Buck Clayton
- Dylan Cramer
- Wayne Escoffery
- Wycliffe Gordon
- Jake Hanna
- Donald Harrison
- Jeanie Lambe
- Johannes Ludwig
- Lyambiko
- Susanne Menzel
- Roy Powell
- Marcus Printup
- Eric Reed
- Claudio Roditi
- Randy Sandke
- Martin Sasse
- Zoot Sims
- Terell Stafford
- Robert Stewart
- Byron Stripling
- Ralph Sutton
- Clark Terry
- Warren Vaché
- Frank Vignola
- Sophie Wegener
- Bob Wilber
