= Dylan Cramer =

Canadian musician (born 1958)

Dylan Cramer (born January 21, 1958, in North Vancouver, British Columbia), is a Canadian alto saxophonist, jazz musician and author.

== Career ==
Cramer took up the saxophone at age 13, after the sudden suicidal death of his father. Four years later in 1975, Cramer heard a recording of alto sax legend Sonny Criss and was so taken with Sonny's playing that, in 1977, he travelled from Canada to Los Angeles to study with him. Cramer met Criss and developed a very close relationship with him over eight months until Sonny, diagnosed with stomach cancer, committed suicide. Extremely distraught over Sonny's death, Cramer was recommended by Dick Grove to study privately with LA studio musician Phil Sobel. Cramer worked with Sobel from 1978 until Sobel's death in 2008, and credits Sobel with "saving my life."

In 1997, 20 years after Sonny's death, Cramer decided to do an album in his honour. For that recording, first released as The First One in 1998, he hired jazz legend and friend of Sonny, Leroy Vinnegar, on bass. In 2011, Nagel-Heyer Records from Hamburg released the tribute album "Remembering Sonny Criss."

In 2001, Cramer released a classic jazz album, "All Night Long." In 2003, Cramer recorded his third album, "Bumpin' On Sunset," which continued Cramer's interpretations of movie themes, latin tunes, and bluesy ballads. 2009 marked the release of Cramer's fourth album, "Alto," released on his own record label, Casa Records. In 2017, Cramer released his fifth album, "Blue Prelude," with longtime musical associate and pianist Ron Johnston, on Casa Records. The album features two songs from George Michael, one from Michael McDonald and another from Stevie Wonder, along with the Amy Winehouse hit, "Back To Black."

In 2019, Cramer published his first book, "Alto Saxophone Mastery," followed three years later by "Chasing My Father," "Flute Artistry" in 2025 and "Cold Spaghetti" in 2026.

== Discography ==
- All Night Long (Nagel-Heyer, 2001)
- Bumpin' On Sunset (Nagel-Heyer, 2003)
- Alto (Casa, 2009)
- Remembering Sonny Criss (Nagel-Heyer, 2011)
- Blue Prelude (Casa, 2017)

== Bibliography ==
- Alto Saxophone Mastery (2019)
- Chasing My Father (2022)
- Flute Artistry (2025)
- Cold Spaghetti (2026)
