= Jeanie Lambe =

Scottish jazz singer (1940–2020)

- Born: Jean Lamb; 23 December 1940; Glasgow, Scotland
- Died: 29 May 2020 (aged 79) Perth, Australia
- Genres: Jazz, swing, traditional pop
- Occupation: Singer
- Years active: 1957–2020
- Labels: Flyright; Nagel-Heyer; World Record Club
- Spouse: Danny Moss (m. 1964; died 2008)

Jeanie Lambe (23 December 1940 – 29 May 2020) was a Scottish jazz singer. She was married to jazz tenor saxophonist Danny Moss.

== Biography ==
Lambe was born on 23 December 1940 in Glasgow, Scotland. Her mother was a singer and her father, Lyston Morven Lamb (also known as Tony), was the son of a Church of Scotland minister in Inverness who played the accordion in the musical act Douglas, Nicol & Lamb. Lambe's first public performances were with her parents. When she was seventeen, she was a member of the Clyde Valley Stompers. She was the female vocalist with the Alex Sutherland sextet at Elgin's Two Red Shoes Ballroom, referred to as the 'Glitterball of the North' run by Albert Bonici where she helped kick off the Two Red Shoes dances, aged 19, on 28 January 1960 with their “Gala Opening And Carnival Night".

Lambe moved to London in 1960 and worked with a variety of jazz bands in that area, including those led by Alex Welsh, Kenny Ball and Charlie Galbraith. She married tenor saxophonist Danny Moss on 6 January 1964, and became more well known through her extensive performances at international jazz festivals.

In September, 1980 Lambe performed with trombonist Cliff Hardie and the UK All Stars Orchestra in London. In 1984 Lambe and her husband played a season in New York with the band of Bobby Rosengarden.

In 1989, Lambe and Moss moved to Perth, Australia and continued to tour internationally into the 2000s. "During her career Lambe has sung with modern and mainstream jazz musicians including Monty Alexander, Ben Webster, Budd Johnson, Oscar Peterson, Wild Bill Davison, Kenny Davern, Joe Pass and Buddy Tate."

She recorded two albums for Nagel-Heyer: Three Great Concerts - Live in Hamburg 1993-1995 and The Blue Noise Session.

"Over the years, Lambe's voice has subtly darkened, adding greater texture to an already fluid musical instrument."

== Personal life and death ==
Lambe married tenor saxophonist Danny Moss on 6 January 1964. Moss and Lambe had two sons, Danny Moss Jnr. and Robert Moss, and remained married until his death on 28 May 2008. Following a stroke in July 2014, Lambe suffered ill health and died in Perth Australia on 29 May 2020 aged 79.

== Discography ==
- Mary Poppins (World Record Club, 1966)
- Jeanie Lambe and the Danny Moss Quartet (Flyright, 1980)
- Blues and All that Jazz (Zodiac, 1982)
- The Midnight Sun (Zodiac, 1984)
- My Man (Zodiac, 1988)
- Three Great Concerts: Live in Hamburg 1993-1995 (Nagel-Heyer, 1996)
- The Blue Noise Session (Nagel-Heyer, 1999)
