= Malcolm Goldstein =

American classical composer

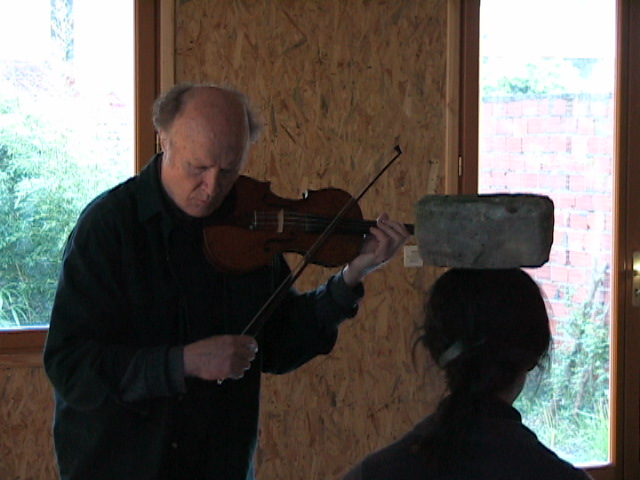

Malcolm Goldstein (born March 27, 1936, in Brooklyn, New York) is an American-Canadian composer, violinist and improviser who has been active in the presentation of new music and dance since the early 1960s. He received an M.A. in music composition from Columbia University in 1960, having studied with Otto Luening. In the 1960s in New York City, he was a co-founder with James Tenney and Philip Corner of the Tone Roads Ensemble and was a participant in the Judson Dance Theater, the New York Festival of the Avant-Garde and the Experimental Intermedia Foundation. Since then, he has toured extensively throughout North America and Europe, with solo concerts as well as with new music and dance ensembles.

Since the mid-1960s he has integrated structured improvisation aspects into his compositions, exploring the rich sound textures of new performance techniques within a variety of instrumental and vocal frameworks. Numerous ensembles such as Essential Music, Relâche, Musical Elements, The New Performance Group of Cornish Institute, L'Art pour l'art, Quatuor Bozzini and Klangforum Wien have performed his music, as well as the Ensemble for New Music/Hessischer Rundfunk, Frankfurt, of which he was the director in the 1990s. His music has been performed at several New Music America festivals, Meet the Moderns/Brooklyn Philharmonic, Pro Musica Nova Bremen, Acustica International/WDR Cologne, Invention '89 Berlin, Wittener Tage für neue Kammermusik, De Ijsbreker Amsterdam, Maerz Music Berlin, Cologne Triennale, Sound Culture Tokyo, Neue Horizonte and Ton Art Bern, and Musique Action Nancy.

He has been awarded grants from the National Endowment for the Arts/Inter-Arts (USA), the Massachusetts Council on the Arts, the Canada Council for the Arts, and Conseil des arts et lettres du Québec, as well as numerous commissions from Studio Akustische Kunst/WDR Cologne. In 1994 he received the Prix International award for his acoustic art/radio work "between (two) spaces".

He has written extensively on improvisation as in his book Sounding the Full Circle. His critical edition of Charles Ives's "Second String Quartet", which was commissioned by the Charles Ives Society, was published by Peermusic Classical in 2016.

He now resides in Sheffield, Vermont, US, and Montréal, Québec, Canada.

== Discography ==
- The Seasons: Vermont, Experimental Intermedia, 1982
- Vision Soundings, Self Released (no label), 1985
- Sounding the New Violin, Nonsequitur/What Next, 1991
- Goldstein Plays Goldstein, Dacapo, 1993
- Live at Fire in the Valley, Eremite Records, 1997
- Monsun with Peter Niklas Wilson, True Muze, 1998
- John Cage: Music for Violin and Percussion with Matthias Kaul, Wergo, 1999
- Christian Wolff: Bread and Roses with Matthias Kaul, Wergo, 2003
- The Smell of Light with Matthias Kaul, NurNichtNur, 2004
- Hardscrabble Songs, In Situ, 2004
- A Sounding of Sources, New World Records, 2008
- Along the Way with Liu Fang, 2010
- Because a Circle is not Enough with Nicolas Caloia, Émilie Girard-Charest, Jean René, New World Records, 2022

== Sources ==
- Garland, Peter "Malcolm Goldstein: a sounding of sources". Liner notes to Malcolm Goldstein: a sounding of sources. New World Records, August 2007.
- Garland, Peter. Composer entry in The New Grove Dictionary of Music and Musicians, revised edition. New York: Oxford University Press, 2000.
