= Danny Moss =

British jazz saxophonist (1927–2008)

- Born: Dennis Moss; 16 August 1927; Redhill, Surrey, England
- Died: 28 May 2008 (aged 80) Perth, Western Australia
- Genres: Jazz, hard bop
- Occupations: Musician, bandleader
- Instruments: Tenor saxophone, clarinet
- Years active: 1943–2008
- Labels: Columbia (EMI), Trunk, Nagel-Heyer Records, 77 Records, Macjazz, Nifnuf
- Spouse: Jeanie Lambe (m. 1964)

Dennis Moss MBE (16 August 1927 – 28 May 2008) was a British jazz tenor saxophonist. He performed with many figures in British jazz, including Vic Lewis, Ted Heath, John Dankworth, Alex Welsh, and Humphrey Lyttelton.

== Biography ==
The son of a toolmaker, Moss was born in Redhill, Surrey in 1927. His childhood was spent on the south coast, in the Brighton-Worthing area, and he attended Steyning Grammar School. At the age of 13, he saw a jazz band appear briefly in a Bowery Boys film on a family cinema visit, and was so inspired by the clarinet playing that he swapped his most valued possession, his ice skates, for a second-hand instrument of his own. He was self-taught on both this and the tenor saxophone, which he took up at school.

A spell of National Service at the age of 18 saw Moss performing for three years in a Royal Air Force regional band. After leaving the forces he joined the Vic Lewis Orchestra, and in the next few years moved around various bands, especially ones with the potential for a soloist. In 1952, he joined Ted Heath's band, a well-paid role which he described as "the prestige job of all time". Soon, however, Moss found the group's focus on novelty numbers and faithful musical reproductions, including that of solos, to be limiting to his skills as an improviser, and he left after three years.

In 1957, Moss joined John Dankworth's orchestra. Here, with the band's encouragement, he began to develop his characteristic saxophone sound, eschewing the contemporary focus on light tone and fast phrasing in favour of a thicker and more spacious sound informed by American tenor saxophonists such as Coleman Hawkins and Ben Webster. When the Dankworth band visited America, Moss' style was singled out for compliment by Count Basie, who declared his playing "real Texas tenor... the way it should sound!" He left Dankworth's band in 1962, as the band itself was winding down. From here, he joined Humphrey Lyttelton's group, where he continued to hone his style for another two years.

He then married jazz singer Jeanie Lambe on 6 January 1964, and the couple moved from London to Sussex at her suggestion. Here, he formed his own quartet, playing a mix of club gigs, festival appearances and radio broadcasts for the BBC. He continued to tour with this quartet throughout the 1970s and 1980s, also playing and recording with American singers like Tony Bennett, Ella Fitzgerald, Bing Crosby, Sarah Vaughan and Rosemary Clooney, and appeared as a guest soloist with Buck Clayton on a Humphrey Lyttelton album, Me And Buck in 1963. He worked with Louis Armstrong on his last British tour. Moss later co-founded British jazz "supergroup" Pizza Express All-Stars in 1980, playing with them until the end of the 1980s.

Moss and Lambe moved to Perth, Western Australia in 1989, although Moss continued to play regularly in Europe.According to his obituary in The Daily Telegraph, his distance from Europe only seemed to increase the level of demand for his performances there.

== Illness and death ==
In November 2005, he was diagnosed with pleural mesothelioma, a rare form of lung cancer caused by exposure to asbestos. He participated in a video produced by Phil Strachan for the Australian medical website Virtual Medical Centre where he was interviewed about his illness and chemotherapy treatment. He died on 28 May 2008, aged 80, survived by Lambe and the couple's two sons.

== Select discography ==
- Like Someone In Love (Columbia recorded c.1966)
- Good Life (originally recorded for 77 Records in 1968, reissue on Progressive, 1996)
- Undecided' The Brian Rutland Band (Flyright Records 1980)
- Weaver of Dreams (Nagel-Heyer, 1994)
- A Swingin' Affair (Nagel-Heyer, 1996)
- Steamers! (Nagel-Heyer, 1999)
- Keeper of the Flame (Nagel-Heyer, 2000)
- Steampower (Nagel-Heyer, 2002)
- At University College Oxford (Maxjazz, 2003)
- Swings Again at the Jazz Party 2003 (Nifnuf, 2005)
- Fine and Dandy (Nifnuf, 2005)
- Easy to Remember (Nifnuf, 2006)
- Bob Barnard's Jazz Party 2006 (Nifnuf, 2006)
