= Dartington College of Arts =

Art and music college in Devon, England

Coordinates: 50.453°N 3.692°W

- Active: 1961–2010
- Administrative staff: 30
- Undergraduates: 500
- Postgraduates: 60
- Doctoral students: 50
- Location: Dartington Hall, Dartington, Devon, England
- Campus: Rural

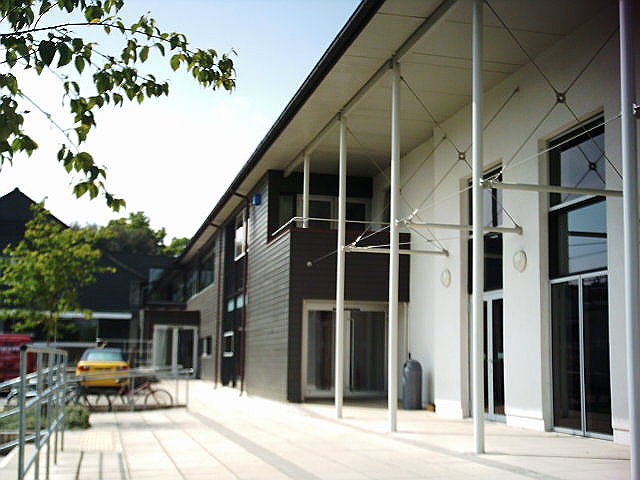
Lower Close buildings

Dartington College of Arts was a specialist arts college located at Dartington Hall in the south-west of England, offering courses at degree and postgraduate level together with an arts research programme. It existed for a period of almost 50 years, from its foundation in 1961, to when it closed at Dartington in 2010. A version of the College was then re-established in what became Falmouth University, and the Dartington title was subsequently dropped. The College was one of only a few in Britain devoted exclusively to specialist practical and theoretical studies in courses spanning right across the arts. It had an international reputation as a centre for contemporary practice. As well as the courses offered, it became a meeting point for practitioners and teachers from around the world. Dartington was known not only as a place for training practitioners, but also for its emphasis on the role of the arts in the wider community.

== History ==
=== Dartington Hall Trust ===
The College was one of a complex of organisations linked to the Dartington Hall Trust, mostly grouped on, or around, the Dartington Hall estate in South Devon. The College emerged out of the already well established activities in arts, education and social and economic reconstruction instigated and funded by Dorothy and Leonard Elmhirst at Dartington Hall from the mid 1920s. Under the umbrella of The Dartington Hall Trust Arts Department, a variety of courses had been offered as privately run initiatives during the 1940s and 1950s, including the first music course started by Imogen Holst in 1944. The Adult Education Centre, which opened in 1955 under the direction of Ivor Weeks, mainly offering evening, short and part-time courses, provided a springboard for a fully-fledged college of arts. The 1950s also saw the formation of the Dartington String Quartet, 1958–1981, which became internationally famous and would play a significant part in the subsequent the musical life of the College for two decades.

=== Founding the College ===
The new College was opened in 1961 within the public sector with local authority support. The Dartington Hall Trust would continue to own the College's buildings and to extend these as time went on. The College's development can best be described in a number of phases, as set out below, although with overlap of individual courses across these phases. In each phase the structure and rationale of the College shifted, largely as a survival strategy in the face of changes in local and national policy and funding. The College managed to keep its independence and ethos throughout, but not without difficulty. Peter Cox, the founding principal, who had previously been Warden of The Dartington Hall Arts Centre, did more than anyone to ensure the College's viability in the early years. He worked at Dartington for over 40 years, from 1940 to 1983.

=== Phase 1: training specialist arts teachers, 1961-1973 ===
The initial focus was on separate specialist teacher training courses in Music (led by Michael Lane), Dance/Drama (led by Ruth Foster) and Visual Art (led by Ivor Weeks), each of which was housed in its own department. The courses were based on the belief that teachers in the arts should be practitioners in their own right. Approval of this programme was based on an association with Rolle College, a teacher training establishment in Exmouth, which would offer a top-up year following either one or two years at Dartington. Although the three separate departments went their own way to a large extent, there was some commonality of approach: a John Dewey-inspired philosophy of "learning by doing." The teacher training courses were established over a period of time, starting with Music, initially led by Doris Gould, and then Dance and Drama, initially led by Ruth Foster. The Art course was the last of the three to come on stream in 1967 led by Ivor Weeks. The strong influence of Corsham (Bath Academy of Art) was a feature of the art teaching at Dartington since the majority of the staff in the early years were Corsham trained. In addition to the new courses for the 18 plus age group, a two-year music preparatory course for 16 to 18 year olds, led by Nigel Amherst was established in 1961 and ran successfully for many years. Similar courses in the other arts were set up around this time, but ran on a smaller scale and for much shorter periods.

=== Phase 2: honours degree courses, 1973-1990 ===
The James Report in 1972 led to a change of Government policy, which now required all teachers in Britain to be graduates. It signalled the beginning of the end for Dartington's involvement in specialist arts teacher training. At the same time there was a shift in funding sources for colleges in higher education from local authority to central government. Fortunately for Dartington, the College was able to apply for so called "assisted status," enabling Devon County Council to top up the finances and the students to apply for grants, then a key factor in recruitment. During the 1970s and 1980s, new degree courses were set up in Music, Theatre and Visual Art. The courses were now validated by the CNAA (Council for National Academic Awards). During this period, College resources, including space and technical support, were steadily improved and staffing was diversified and enhanced. For initial and for continuing validation, adequate levels of student achievement in practice and theory had to be demonstrated. Once established, the longer courses inevitably led to higher standards overall. The following degree courses were set up during this period:

- The 3 Year Hons. Degree in Music, established in 1974 and led by Jack Dobbs, then Janet Ritterman and then Bob Hanson. The new degree followed a short experiment in running a degree in Music and English with the University of Exeter. While the specific teacher training focus was now dropped, the long-held Dartington belief in ‘music for all’ remained as an underlying philosophy. There were practical options not only in the Western classical tradition, but also jazz, popular music, folk music, improvisation, experimental contemporary music, electronic music and the music of other cultures. This last category was one where Dartington offered, uniquely at the time, practical studies in Indian classical music, in the Balinese Gamelan and in Japanese Shakuhachi flute playing. Work was also offered in the field of music and special needs education led by David Ward, with inter-arts collaboration from Bruce Kent and Keith Yon. A ‘Music in Society’ option was added when the course was revised in 1981 to replace the 2 year Dip HE. Music in the Community, previously established in the early 1970s by Gordon Jones.
- The 4 Year Hons. Degree in Theatre, established in 1976, led by Collette King, followed by Peter Hulton and then Claire Macdonald. The course included three areas of work: movement/choreography, writing, and acting/directing with some specialisation in one or other of these from the second year onwards. A unique feature of the new course was its 4 year duration allowing for a third year off-campus involving community-based work. The emphasis continued to be on the creation of new work, as distinct from training actors for the stage. Although integrated into a broader theatre degree, Dartington's already established reputation for Dance grew internationally during these years. It became known for its emphasis on experimental dance making and its early introduction of Release Work under Mary Fulkerson. Mary was succeeded by Katy Duck and then others in the next phase of the College. The writing element of the course was led by Peter Hulton, who worked in the College from 1969–1990, later becoming Head of Theatre and then Principal. He was the instigator of the Dartington Theatre Papers and subsequently the Arts Archive (a digital collection of theatre and dance research, now hosted by the University of Exeter). Assistant editors of the Theatre Papers included in succession: Alan Read, David Williams and Ric Allsopp. Acting and directing was led by Roger Sell who also led the Dartington College of Arts International Office supervising Erasmus student and staff exchanges and other international connections, for example with the Cornish Institute, Seattle.
- The 3 Year Hons. Degree in Art and Social Context, established in 1986, led by Chris Crickmay, replaced the two-year Dip. HE with a similar title which had been launched by Paul Oliver in 1977. By the time the three-year degree was launched, the earlier two-year course had already been much developed, with particular inputs from Chris Crickmay and David Harding who had both arrived at Dartington in 1978. The focus on social context proved generative on many levels. Besides the usual studio-based activity, the course included elements of group work, site-specific work and a student residency. Students were able to opt for work in the full range of media generally covered in fine art: painting, sculpture, print making, photography, video, live art and installation. The prevalence of social and cultural concerns in the work of many Turner Prize winners in recent years is just one example of a widening social consciousness in the arts suggesting that this Dartington initiative was well ahead of its time.

Following Peter Cox, College Principals in this period included Curtis Roosevelt, Peter Hulton and Janet Ritterman.

=== Phase 3: unifying and extending the programme 1990-2010 ===
With the 1988 Education Reform Act, the College found itself again in a financially vulnerable position. Changes in national policy put an end to previous local authority support via the Assisted Status programme. To make matters worse, in 1989, accounts showed that the College was operating at a considerable loss. Extreme measures were required if it were to survive. Most contentiously, the relatively new BA Hons. in Art and Social Context was discontinued, with the loss of its staff and facilities. The College would now focus purely on Performance Arts. The unique four-year format of the theatre degree was another casualty, along with its urban outposts. The option to study Indian music was dropped. In the shake up, the Polytechnic South West (later University of Plymouth) agreed to play an active part in a necessarily unequal partnership, assuming a full quality assurance role and making some conditions for their support.

The parameters were set for a new academic structure: a single framework across the undergraduate programme leading to three-year courses as either single honours, or combined awards. The entire programme was established and initially led by the poet John Hall. A common modular structure would make cross-disciplinary work and collaboration across courses easier than it had been in the earlier years. Major and minor options were available, which also encouraged students to explore across disciplines. Existing degree courses were re-written within a common modular template, which included a common approach to off-campus work in the final year and a common approach to Cultural Studies which had previously been taught differently in the separate departments. A final year dissertation was now included as part of the common approach. During this phase, the following programmes were available:

- BA Hons. Music led by Trevor Wiggins. The focus and content of the degree continued to be unique in comparison with other institutions. There was a focus on all genres of contemporary music, a requirement to combine practice and theory, and to explore this in relation to a specific context off-campus, as well as the possibility of work across disciplines. These precepts led to the development of a four-year "International" award in 2000 that included a year in a partner institution in Europe, the USA, or New Zealand.
- BA Hons. Theatre led in succession by: Roger Sell, Josie Sutcliffe, David Williams, Simon Murray and Fred McVittie. As with the previous theatre degree, the course focussed on contemporary devised theatre including group and solo practices. Students developed their work both in studios and on-site on the estate, in South Devon, nationally and abroad. Aspects of the work included physical theatre, experiments in writing, site-specificity, improvisation and digital technologies. But overall the emphasis was on making new theatre work and a student’s creative practice. Exploration across the arts was also encouraged. In the final year students developed their own contextual enquiry, a "statement in action", a group devised piece and a dissertation. Dance/ Movement within the Theatre degree was led by Diana Theodorus, but later separated from Theatre and re-titled as Choreography (see below).

Several new courses were introduced during this phase of the College's development. They included:

- BA Hons. Visual Performance, established 1991, led successively by Sally Morgan, Roger Bourke, Roddy Hunter, and Rob Gawthrop. The new course covered those areas of visual art that overlap and inform the performing arts. It included contemporary visual art practices such as Live Art and Installation, which arguably required no specialist facilities in the College, beyond those needed for Theatre and Music.
- BA Hons. Performance Writing, established 1994, initially led by John Hall, with significant contributions in the earlier years from Caroline Bergvall, and those others who were part of the teaching team, including many visitors. The course was designed to make sense of writing in the context of performance practices and of a wider understanding of the various circumstances where writing combines with other media. With its intention to stimulate new approaches to writing, it carried much of the enthusiasm of a pioneering subject field and quickly proved influential internationally.
- BA Hons in Choreography was established in 2003 led successively by Emilyn Claid, Sara Reed and Suzanne Thomas.
- An Integrated Masters Programme, which included the MA in Performance Practices, was approved in 1997, with students registering from 1999. Students welcomed the cross-disciplinary framework. It was initially led by John Hall and later by Catherine Laws and then Mark Leahy.
- MA in Arts and Ecology, established in 2006, was led initially by Alan Boldon and subsequently by Richard Povall, with some academic links to the Trust’s Schumacher College, it combined some set modules along with students’ own independent arts practice.
- MA in Choreography, established in 2004, initially led by Emilyn Claid.
- MA in Arts and Cultural Management, established in 2006, led by Tracey Warr.

A College Research Programme was formally established in 1996, approved within the UK Research Assessment Exercise (RAE), with students taking PhDs. and a number of staff engaging in their own dramaturgy, site-specific theatre, and musical practices. This work was coordinated, first by Edward Cowie, and later by Prof. Antonia Payne.

Dartington hosted the journal Performance Research from 2002-2007. Ric Allsopp, one of its co-founders, was a Research Fellow and Visiting Reader in Performance Research (1997–2001) and Director of Writing 2001-2004.

College Principals in this period included: Janet Ritterman, Kevin Thompson and Andrew Brewerton.

== Context and community ==
A belief in the value of active participation in the arts in the wider community bound the College’s work into a common enterprise and linked it back to the early history of Dartington. This commitment ran deep in the courses, affecting almost all curriculum decisions and approaches to the work. But, in view of its educational rather than training remit, Dartington was not at any point offering a training in Community Arts or other vocational areas. Rather, the focus was to expose students to practical and theoretical questions regarding the role of the arts in the wider world. A major device for doing this was through off-campus project work. Approaches to this varied according to art form, but converged over time. Thus, in the 70s and 80s, Theatre went for a whole third year experience out-of-college in urban outposts, where work could be, to an extent, ongoing from year to year. Outposts existed in Rotherhithe, London, run by Alan Read and in the Stonehouse area of Plymouth, run initially by Will Fitzgerald and Roger Sell. Joe Richard’s role-playing work in Dartmoor prison, and with young offenders at Glenthorne Youth Treatment Centre in Birmingham, is also relevant here. Music in Society opted for a more limited student placement, set in Bristol, and lasting just one term. It included work in schools and other community settings. It was coordinated by Gordon Jones, David Ward and Nick Brace. Art adopted a somewhat different artists residency, model, in which students would individually negotiate a setting in the local region to which a significant part of their final year's work would relate, directly or indirectly involving members of the public. This allowed a flexible and ongoing engagement, where students could research a setting over time, find an appropriate strategy of intervention and work in, or out, of College at different stages as circumstances required. Choices of residency varied enormously, from a light house, to a fish shop, to a water company, to working with a single child with a disability. After 1990, a unified strategy for off-campus work was adopted across the College, taking the form of an individually negotiated contextual enquiry project, with no general stipulation as to where it could take place: many students went abroad. In all cases, whatever the approach, the idea was to find a role for the arts in communities or settings the established arts did not normally serve. All of this work required students to develop an open and responsive attitude in tailoring their practice to particular circumstances. Broader social and cultural questions inevitably arose in the work and were addressed in strands of Cultural Studies throughout, as well as in one-to-one and group supervision of project work.

== Dartington College of Arts and other Dartington organisations ==
The Dartington Hall Trust initiated a large number of associated organisations and events. These included numerous industries, gardens, farms, research projects, training schemes, short courses, conferences, talks and festivals. Taken together, they contributed significantly to the region and to the wider world and enriched the environment of the College. Some continue to this day. Besides the College, other educational and training initiatives included: Dartington Hall School(1926–1987), The Devon Centre for Further Education (1963–89), Schumacher College: (started in 1990) and The Old Postern Youth Training Scheme (1979–91).

Other arts initiatives besides the College included:

- the Dartington Arts Society: emerging out of the Dartington Hall Arts Centre in 1967, it was responsible for a diverse programme of public arts events, including film, theatre, music, and dance, for most of which it drew heavily upon the expertise of College staff, and is latterly known as 'Dartington Arts';
- a specific film study programme was part of the art course in the 70s and 80s;
- the Dartington Music Summer School and Festival: a major 4 week annual event, with concerts, talks, master classes and workshops, which moved to Dartington in 1953 and still continues.

Besides the above, the College also ran its own festivals, summer schools, short courses and special events which ran for certain periods in its history, mostly out of term time, altogether significantly enriching the cultural life of the area.

== Recent history ==
=== Relocation of 'Art and Social Context' to Bristol in 1991 ===
The degree in Art and Social Context, one of the main casualties of the 1989 financial crisis at Dartington, was re-established in The Faculty of Art Media and Design at what was then Bristol Polytechnic (later to become University of the West of England). The course was moved, along with a small contingent of ex-Dartington staff, including Chris Crickmay and Sally Morgan. The latter became course leader. It flourished in this new urban environment for a further decade. It was then gradually wound down following the departure of specialist staff.

=== Relocation of the College to Falmouth in 2010 ===
In the autumn of 2006, financial problems began to emerge once again and there was a sense that the College might be facing closure, although there was no inevitability in that outcome. In the years 2006-8 the College was far from being a failing institution. Student numbers at undergraduate and postgraduate level were higher than they had ever been and the College was performing well. Whilst Government policy was to reduce the number of smaller colleges in favour of larger institutions, this was not the reason for, or cause, of the closure and there is no knowing how it would have played out in the ensuing years had it remained open. For a while there seemed to be ways out through an increase in student numbers and the upgrading of student accommodation on the estate, but the College and the Trust could not agree on these matters and the College’s status of not owning its own campus and being a tenant of the Trust, ultimately made it critically vulnerable. The crisis led to a controversial and contested merger with the then University College Falmouth and the relocation of most courses and some staff and students to Cornwall.

The courses were based in a new purpose-built Performing Arts Centre on the Penryn campus. Main programmes in Dance, Choreography, Theatre, Acting and Music with some, more vocational additions including Arts Management, still continue successfully in that location. Falmouth already had, and still has, its own long-established art school with courses in visual art that are also ongoing. Writing was already taught at Falmouth, so Performance Writing was not continued, apart from at research and Masters level.

=== Final Closure ===
In 2022, the Trust opened a new Dartington Arts School offering a programme of postgraduate courses across the arts with an emphasis on ecology, place and imagination. This was planned to run in parallel with Dartington’s existing Schumacher College, which offers a range of post-graduate courses in ecology. Both, however, closed in September 2024.
