= Walden String Quartet =

The Walden String Quartet was a chamber music ensemble formed in 1934 by members of the Cleveland Orchestra. It was originally the idea of violinist Homer Schmitt and cellist Robert Swenson, who met in 1927. They recruited violinist Bernard Goodman and violist Leroy Collins for the original group. The viola chair changed many times until John Garvey joined in 1948.

By 1935 the quartet were featured in half-hour network radio programs.

In March 1936, at the Cleveland Museum of Art, the quartet gave its first concert. In accord with their policy of emphasizing modern composers, the program included the Hindemith String Quartet No 4, and quartets by composers Quincy Porter and Normand Lockwood. By 1945, they had performed in over 70 radio programs and given 27 concerts at the museum.

The quartet had several affiliations with educational institutions. For a while they were known as the "Walden Quartet of Cleveland College", referring to the adult education campus of Western Reserve University. In 1946 they became quartet-in-residence at Cornell University. The next year, following the move of Cornell's head of music to the University of Illinois, they became quartet-in-residence at that school with academic appointments, a first in the United States. The quartet remained there until it disbanded in the late 1970s.

In 1949, the quartet was selected by the civil affairs division of the U.S. war department to tour Austria and Germany, as well as Brussels, Amsterdam, Paris, and finally London, where they performed Quartet No.2 by Wallingford Riegger and Charles Ives's Second String Quartet.

The group premiered many 20th Century works including Elliott Carter's String Quartet No. 1, which was dedicated to them.

== Recordings ==
- Zoltan Kodaly Quartet No 2, Op. 10/Karol Syzmanowski Quartet in C Major, Op 37. Lyrichord. 1951. OCLC 28007974. LL-22.
- William Bergsma: String Quartet No. 2/Arthur Shepherd: Triptych for Soprano and String Quartet. American Recording Society. 1953. OCLC 21344182. ARS-18.
- Robert Palmer: Quartet for piano and strings (Syracuse, Sept. 3, 1947). Columbia. 1954. OCLC 4578586. ML-4842.
- Ernest Bloch: Quintet for Piano and Strings. MGM Records. 1955. OCLC 3528792. E3239.
- Elliott Carter String Quartet No. 1. Columbia. 1956. OCLC 2100491. ML 5104.
- Andrew Imbrie:String Quartets 2 And 3. Contemporary Records. 1958. OCLC 8305098. C6003.
- Charles Ives: Second String Quartet. Folkways Records. 1966. OCLC 26452997. FM 3369.
- William Masselos, Izler Solomon – Quintet For Piano & Strings / Khaldis: Concerto For Piano, Four Trumpets & Percussion. Heliodor. 1966. OCLC 15586079. HS-25027.
