= Jordan Sandke =

American jazz musician

Jordan Sandke is an American jazz trumpeter, cornetist, and fluegelhornist.

== Biography ==
Sandke was born around 1946. His main area of musical interest is the swing era. He and his brother, Randy Sandke, played in the Widespread Depression Jazz Orchestra. His recording debut as sole leader was Rhythm Is Our Business, for Stash Records in 1985. He played both trumpet and cornet on the album, which also featured Tad Shull (tenor sax), Jaki Byard (piano), Milt Hinton (bass), and Charlie Braugham (drums).

== Playing style ==
A 1988 reviewer commented that "Sandke, using both trumpet and fluegelhorn, is rich-toned and mellow at one moment or crisply biting at another." With the Widespread Depression Orchestra, he played "gloriously growling full-bodied Cootie Williams solos".

== Discography ==
=== As leader/co-leader ===
- Rhythm Is Our Business (Stash, 1985)

=== As sideman ===
With Widespread Depression Orchestra

- Downtown Uproar (Stash, 1979)
- Boogie in the Barnyard (Stash, 1980)
- Rockin' in Rhythm (Phontastic, 1980)
- Time to Jump and Shout (Stash, 1981)

With Widespread Jazz Orchestra

- Swing Is the Thing (Adelphi, 1982)
- Paris Blues (Columbia, 1984)
