= Murray Wall =

Australian musician

- Born: 28 September 1945; Melbourne, Victoria, Australia
- Died: July 18, 2022 (aged 76)
- Genres: Jazz
- Instrument: double bass
- Years active: 1962–2022
- Label: Zinnia

Murray James Wall (September 28, 1945 - July 18, 2022) was an Australian jazz double bassist.

Born in Melbourne, Wall was an autodidact on double bass, having learned by playing along with records by Oscar Pettiford. He began playing professionally in 1962 and played with visiting musicians such as Clark Terry, Mel Torme, and Billy Eckstine. He moved to the United States in 1979 and played with Jon Hendricks in 1981–1985, including tours of Europe and Israel. He played with Benny Goodman in 1985–1986, and following this played as a sideman with Ken Peplowski, Marty Grosz, Keith Ingham, Frank Vignola, Chuck Wilson, and Spanky Davis. He also played with Buck Clayton, Grover Mitchell, Annie Ross, Richard Wyands, Kenny Davern, and Claude Williams.

== Discography ==
Charles Sibirsky & Murray Wall

- Just Jazz, Just Two (Zinnia Records, 1995)
