= Marion Hayden =

American jazz bass player (born 1952)

- Born: Marion Hayden; 1956 (age 69–70); Detroit, Michigan United States
- Origin: Detroit, Michigan, United States
- Genres: Jazz
- Occupation: Musician
- Instrument: Bass
- Labels: Blue Note, Atlantic
- Website: marionhayden.com

Marion Hayden (born 1952) is an American jazz bass player from Detroit. She has performed and recorded with numerous musicians from the 1980s onwards. Hayden received the Kresge Eminent Artist Award in 2025.

== Early life ==
Hayden was born in 1952 and grew up in Detroit's historic Russell Woods neighborhood. Her father, Herbert Hayden, was an avid jazz record collector and jazz pianist; she was named after her mother Marion, who taught high school chemistry and played mostly classical music. also on the piano. Hayden's first instrument was the cello at age 9; she wanted to play bass, but there weren't any available small enough for a nine year old, so she played the cello. When she was 12 years old she was finally big enough to play the bass, and while she had attempted to play jazz on the cello "it really came together" when she switched to the bass.

By the age of 15 she was studying with Marcus Belgrave, the artist in residence at Cass Tech High School, where she was a student; she later transferred to and graduated from Henry Ford High School.

Hayden enrolled at the University of Michigan 1973, majoring in journalism with a minor in entomology, followed by attending both Michigan State University and the University of Michigan for graduate studies in natural sciences. Her parents thought that a career in music "was not steady". After college, she took a job with the Michigan Department of Agriculture as an inspector. Except for a brief hiatus in the early 80, she continued to play.

== Career ==
A "first-call" bassist in the jazz world, Hayden has performed or recorded with Kirk Lightsey, Ralph Peterson, Jr., Terry Callier, Dizzy Gillespie, Sonny Fortune, Kenny Burrell, Steve Turre, Cecil Bridgewater, James Carter, Kenn Cox, Roy Brooks, DeeDee Bridgewater, Kirk Lightsey, Steve Turre, Jon Faddis, Kamau Kenyatta, Terri Lyne Carrington, Ingrid Jensen, Nicolas Payton, Charlie Gabriel of the Preservation Hall Jazz Band, Gregory Porter, Regina Carter, Louis Hayes, Bobby McFerrin, Nancy Wilson, Geri Allen, Lester Bowie, David Allen Grier, Dorothy Donegan, Joe Williams, Lionel Hampton, Frank Morgan, Jon Hendricks, Hank Jones, Bobby Hutcherson, Larry Willis, Vanessa Rubin, Sheila Jordan, Mulgrew Miller, and Annie Ross.

Hayden is a founding member of the Grammy-nominated all female jazz group Straight Ahead, which released three albums on Atlantic Records. She is a member of the Detroit International Jazz Festival All-Star Ambassadors touring ensemble.

She holds faculty positions in the Jazz Studies Departments at University of Michigan and Oakland University, teaches for Michigan State University Community Music School Detroit, and is an educator in residence for the Detroit Jazz Festival. Hayden is also the bass instructor for the Geri Allen Jazz Camp, Newark, NJ.

== Discography ==
=== As leader ===
- Visions (2009)

=== With Straight Ahead ===
- Look Straight Ahead, Atlantic (1991)
- Body & Soul, Atlantic (1993)
- Dance of the Forest Rain, Atlantic (1995)
- Best Of, Straight Ahead Recordings (2004)
- City Cuts, Straight Ahead Recordings (2005)
