= Skinner Releasing Technique =

Skinner Releasing Technique (SRT) created by Joan Skinner is practised and taught worldwide. Emslie, M.A. (2021) describes it as "a somatic movement, dance and creative practice with a core underlying principle of releasing blocked energy, held tension, and habitual patterns of body mind. It enables us to move with greater freedom and ease whilst awakening creativity and spontaneity".

"By focusing on personal, kinaesthetic experience of essential principles of movement, SRT may enhance any movement style whilst fostering artistic sensibility and creative unfoldment"

SRT is unusual in that technical aspects of moving and dancing, such as posture and alignment are experienced as creative explorations that take form as spontaneous movement. Technical and creative aspects of practice are indistinguishable.

Joan Skinner created an Introductory Level of SRT, as well as an Ongoing Level and there is a children's pedagogy in existence. The introductory Level consists of 15 classes and the Ongoing Level is that of 12 classes. The Ongoing classes allow participants to slip deeper in to practice and they are more spacious than the introductory Level classes. There is also an Advanced Level. Skinner described the shift from Ongoing Level to Advanced Level as being "'when things start dissolving ... there is only consciousness left".

Whatever the level of classes, the pedagogies consist of key activities that are, Checklists, Image Actions, Partner Graphics, Partner Dances/Partner Movement Studies, Movement Studies (with an image) and Totalities.

== Releasing and Release Techniques ==
SRT sits beneath the canopy term of Release Techniques and thus is part of a wider Release community. However, Skinner was very clear about differentiating Releasing from Release based practice. The difference she pointed out is that Releasing is ongoing and so we notice and respond to what is arising moment by moment; where as Release Technique is understood to be an aesthetic of the body moving with ease, fluidity, lightness, power and strength. Releasing is the means by which we achieve those qualities.

== Joan Skinner ==
Joan Skinner (1924-2021) was born in Minneapolis (USA) in the early 1920s. As a child she participated in 'interpretive dancing' classes led by Cora Bell Hunter - who had been taught by Mabel Elsworth Todd, author of the book The Thinking Body. Bell Hunter's classes, especially her use of imagery, had a long-lasting effect on Skinner and she later told her students about the classes.

On leaving high school in 1942 Skinner gained a scholarship to study theatre, music and dance at Bennington Arts College, Vermont. She met Martha Graham at Bennington College and Graham suggested that Skinner should continue dance study in New York. Once Skinner had graduated from Bennington, she enrolled at The Martha Graham Centre and eventually became a member of the Martha Graham Dance Company in which she danced Appalachian Spring (1944), Dark Meadow (1946), and the premier of Diversion of Angels (1948).

After a number of years of teaching at the Martha Graham Centre and performing in the company, she left in 1950. On leaving she became a member of the Merce Cunningham Dance Company. It was during that time that she embarked on practice and research which became Skinner Releasing Technique.

Skinner left the Cunningham company in 1953. Shortly afterward she went on a concert tour choreographed by Jerome Robbins and Ray Harrison. She continued to perform and choreograph but a shift in her career happened in the 1960s. From 1961-64 she taught at the University of Illinois, Champaign. From 1964-66 she was artist in Residence at The Walker Arts Centre and Tyrone Guthrie Theatre in Minneapolis after which she returned to the University of Illinois for a year, 1966-1967. It was with her dance students at Illinois that the beginnings of Skinner Releasing were first shared and practiced. Skinner credits her Illinois students as giving her practice the name Releasing. She said "They [the students] just kept saying, we're doing the releasing technique. It must have been because I was saying, Well we're releasing this, we're releasing that".

In 1967 she became a full-time staff member at The University of Washington, Seattle. From 1985 she became Head of the Dance Department. She retired in 1987 but continued to teach and develop Skinner Releasing Technique until the early 2000s.

She lived in Seattle with her husband, Jim Knapp, a musician.
