= Roy Gerson =

American jazz pianist (1959–2023)

Roy N. Gerson (June 7, 1959 – December 2, 2023) was an American jazz pianist. He appeared in the movies The Cotton Club, Crimes and Misdemeanors, and The Mirror Has Two Faces and The Associate.

Gerson released That Gerson Person in 1991 and Gerson Swings Disney in 2001.

Gerson's song "If I Had You" appeared in the 1999 film Eyes Wide Shut. Gerson was also involved in the production of the soundtrack for the film.

Gerson and his band the Roy Gerson Swingtet performed live in jazz clubs in Manhattan, New York during the 1990s at venues such as the Village Gate, Blue Note, Tavern on the Green, and played for two years at Zanzibar.

Roy Gerson died on December 2, 2023, at the age of 64.
