= Warren Vaché Jr. =

American jazz trumpeter, cornetist and flugelhornist (born 1951)

Warren Vaché
- Born: February 21, 1951 (age 75); Rahway, New Jersey, U.S.
- Genre: Jazz
- Occupation: Musician
- Instruments: Trumpet; cornet; flugelhorn
- Labels: Muse; Arbors
- Website: www.warrenvache.com

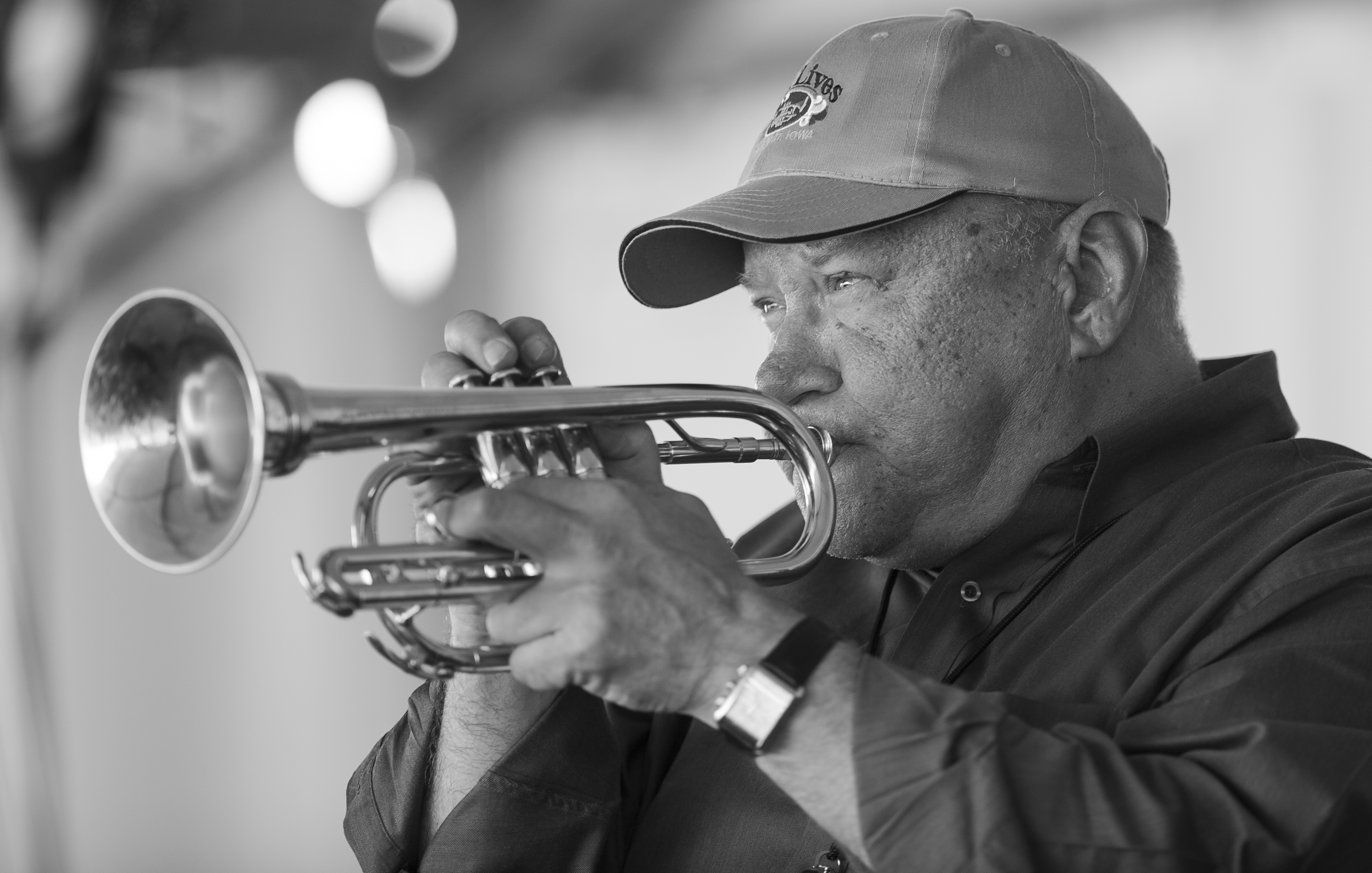
Warren Vaché Jr. at the JVC Newport Jazz Festival

Warren Vaché Jr. (born February 21, 1951) is an American jazz trumpeter, cornetist, and flugelhornist. He came from a musical family as his father was a bassist. In 1976, he released his first album. He has often worked with Scott Hamilton and has some popularity among swing audiences.

Born and raised in Rahway, New Jersey, Vaché graduated from Rahway High School, where he played in the marching band.

Warren Vaché's father is Warren Vaché Sr., who was a jazz double-bassist. His brother Allan Vaché is also a musician.

== Discography ==
=== As leader/co-leader ===
- First Time Out (Monmouth Evergreen, 1976)
- Blues Walk (Dreamstreet, 1978)
- Jillian (Concord Jazz, 1979)
- Polished Brass (Concord Jazz, 1979)
- Skyscrapers with Scott Hamilton (Concord Jazz, 1980)
- Iridescence (Concord Jazz, 1981)
- Midtown Jazz (Concord Jazz. 1982)
- Easy Going (Concord Jazz, 1986)
- Warm Evenings with The Beaux Arts String Quartet (Concord, 1989)
- Horn of Plenty (Muse, 1994) – rec. 1993
- Talk To Me Baby (Muse, 1996) – rec. 1995
- Warren Plays Warren with Kenny Drew Jr., Jimmy Cobb, Randy Sandke (Nagel-Heyer, 1996)
- An Affair to Remember with Brian Lemon (Zephyr, 1997)
- Shine with Tony Coe, Alan Barnes, Brian Lemon (Zephyr, 1997)
- What Is There to Say? with Joe Puma, Murray Wall, Eddie Locke (Nagel-Heyer, 1999)
- Mrs. Vache's Boys with Allan Vaché (Nagel-Heyer, 1999)
- 2gether with Bill Charlap (Nagel-Heyer, 2000)
- The Best Thing for You (Nagel-Heyer, 2001)
- Remember with Allan Vaché (Nagel-Heyer, 2007) – remastered reissue of Mrs. Vache's Boys (1999)
- The Warren Vache Quintet Remembers Benny Carter (Arbors, 2015)
- Songs Our Fathers Taught Us (Arbors, 2019)

=== As sideman ===
With Howard Alden

- The Howard Alden Trio Plus Special Guests Ken Peplowski & Warren Vache (Concord, 1989)
- I Remember Django (Arbors, 2010)

With Benny Carter

- Benny Carter Songbook (MusicMasters, 1996)
- Benny Carter Songbook Volume II (MusicMasters, 1997)

With Houston Person

- So Nice (HighNote, 2011)
- Rain or Shine (HighNote, 2017)

With others

- Benny Goodman, Live at Carnegie Hall 40th Anniversary Concert (London, 1978)
- Bucky Pizzarelli, Five for Freddie (Arbors, 2007)
- André Previn, What Headphones? (Angel, 1993)
- George Shearing, George Shearing in Dixieland (Concord, 1989)
- George Wein, Wein, Women and Song and More, George Wein Plays and Sings (Arbors, 2002)
