= Randy Sandke =

American jazz trumpeter and guitarist

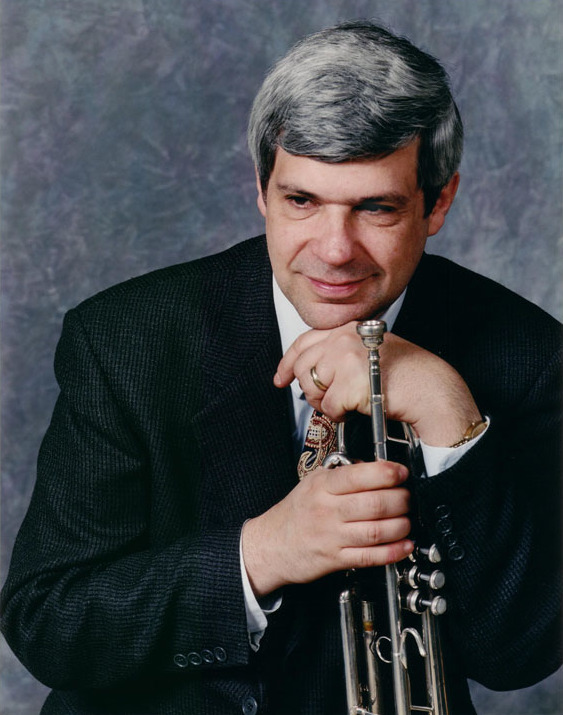

Background information
- Birth name: Jay Randall Sandke
- Born: May 29, 1949; Chicago, Illinois, U.S.
- Genres: Jazz
- Occupation: Musician
- Instruments: Trumpet; guitar
- Years active: 1968–present
- Labels: Stash; Jazzology; Concord Jazz; Nagel-Heyer; Arbors
- Website: www.randysandke.com

Jay Randall Sandke (born May 5, 1949 in Chicago, Illinois) is a jazz trumpeter and guitarist.

While a student at Indiana University in 1968, he and Michael Brecker started a jazz-rock band (Mrs. Seamon's Sound Band) that performed at the Notre Dame Collegiate Jazz Festival. He was invited to be a member of the backing band for rock singer Janis Joplin, but a throat problem kept him from performing. Despite a successful operation on his throat, he gave up the trumpet, moved to New York City, and played guitar for the next ten years. When he returned to the trumpet, he became a member of the Nighthawks Orchestra led by Vince Giordano, followed by membership in Bechet's Legacy led by Bob Wilber. From 1984–1985, he was part of Benny Goodman's last band.

Sandke remarks in the liner notes to The Subway Ballet: "Okay – I worked with Benny Goodman, but so did Fats Navarro and Herbie Hancock and nobody refers to them as 'swing musicians'. ...Being thus labeled is somewhat akin to being called a child molester in that the tag never seems to go away, and both can be equally deleterious to one's career." He has recorded over twenty albums as a leader, ranging from revisitings of music from the 1920s and 1930s to explorations of contemporary idioms in the company Michael Brecker, Kenny Barron, Marty Ehrlich, Bill Charlap, and Uri Caine. He became interested in exploring dissonant, nonstandard harmonies that lie outside of conventional triadic harmony, creating a musical theory of what he calls "metatonality", a harmonic system outlined in his book Harmony for a New Millennium.

He has led the New York All-Stars with Dan Barrett and Ken Peplowski, the Metatonal Band with Marvin Smith and Ted Rosenthal, and has done arrangements for the Carnegie Hall Jazz Orchestra. His writings include a method book about his "metatonal" approach to harmony. He has a brother, Jordan Sandke, who is a trumpeter. Both brothers played in the Widespread Depression Jazz Orchestra.

His albums include Trumpet After Dark, a jazz-with-strings album that uses Renaissance viols instead of modern violins. Inside Out and Outside In bring together mainstream jazz musicians such as Ken Peplowski and avant-garde jazz musicians Ray Anderson and Uri Caine. His work appeared in the movies The Cotton Club, Bullets over Broadway, and The Curse of the Jade Scorpion.

== Discography ==
=== As leader ===
- New York Stories (Stash, 1986)
- Stampede (Jazzology, 1992)
- The Bix Beiderbecke Era (Nagel-Heyer, 1993)
- I Hear Music (Concord Jazz, 1993)
- Get Happy (Concord Jazz, 1994)
- The Chase (Concord Jazz, 1995)
- Calling All Cats (Concord Jazz, 1996)
- The Music of the Trumpet Kings with Harry Allen (Nagel-Heyer, 1997)
- Awakening (Concord Concerto 1998)
- The Re-discovered Louis and Bix (Nagel-Heyer, 2000)
- Uptown Lowdown: A Jazz Salute to the Big Apple (Nagel-Heyer, 2004)
- Randy Sandke Meets Bix Beiderbecke (Nagel-Heyer, 2002)
- Inside Out: Mainstream Meets the New Music (Nagel-Heyer, 2002)
- The Music of Bob Haggart (Arbors, 2002)
- Cliffhanger (Nagel-Heyer, 2003)
- Outside In (Evening Star Records, 2005)
- Trumpet After Dark (Evening Star, 2005)
- Now & Again with Dick Hyman (Arbors, 2005)
- Unconventional Wisdom (Arbors, 2008)
- Jazz for Juniors (Arbors Records, 2009)

With the New York Allstars

- Play Jazz Favorites/Broadway (Nagel-Heyer, 1993)
- We Love You, Louis! (Nagel-Heyer, 1996)
- Count Basie Remembered Volume One (Nagel-Heyer, 1997)
- Count Basie Remembered Volume Two (Nagel-Heyer, 1997)
- The New York Allstars Play Lionel Hampton Volume One (Nagel-Heyer, 1999)

=== As sideman ===
With Susannah McCorkle

- From Bessie to Brazil (Concord Jazz, 1993)
- From Broadway to Bebop (Concord Jazz, 1994)
- Easy to Love: The Songs of Cole Porter (Concord Jazz, 1995)
- Easy to Love (Concord Jazz, 1996)
- Someone to Watch Over Me (Concord Jazz, 1998)

With others

- Harry Allen, A Night at Birdland Volume 1 (Nagel-Heyer, 1994)
- Harry Allen, A Night at Birdland Volume 2 (Nagel-Heyer, 1995)
- Karrin Allyson, Sweet Home Cookin' (Concord Jazz, 1994)
- Karrin Allyson, Scott Hamilton, Concord Jazz Festival All-Stars, Fujitsu-Concord 27th Jazz Festival (Concord 1996)
- John Barry, The Cotton Club (Geffen, 1984)
- Ann Hampton Callaway, From Sassy to Divine (Shanachie, 2014)
- Gerard Carelli, Lucky to Be Me, (GC Records, 2000)
- Barbara Carroll, Everything I Love (DRG Records, 1995)
- James Chirillo, Sultry Serenade (Nagel-Heyer, 2000)
- Vince Giordano's Nighthawks, The Music Of The Cotton Club (Sine Qua Non)
- Wycliffe Gordon, Slidin' Home (Nagel-Heyer, 1999)
- Marty Groz, Songs I Learned at My Mother's Knee and Other Low Joints (Jazzology, 1994)
- Jon Hendricks, Freddie Freeloader (Denon, 1990)
- Peanuts Hucko Featuring Louise Tobin, Swing That Music (Star Line 1992)
- Peanuts Hucko, Billy Butterfield, Trummy Young, Tribute to Louis Armstrong (Jazz Heritage 1994)
- Dick Hyman, Swing Is Here (Reference 1996)
- Oliver Jackson, The Last Great Concert (Nagel-Heyer, 2000)
- Jeff Jerolamon, Swing Thing! (Candid, 1993)
- Jerry Jerome, Something Old, Something New (Arbors, 1997)
- Erich Kunzel, Route 66 (Telarc, 2000)
- Erich Kunzel, Nice 'N' Easy: Celebrating Sinatra (Telarc, 2001)
- Allen Lowe, Woyzeck's Death (Enja, 1995)
- Allen Lowe, Jews in Hell (Spaceout 2006)
- Allen Lowe, A Day in Brooklyn (Constant Sorrow, 2015)
- Allen Lowe, Jews & Roots: An Avant Garde of Our Own: Disconnected Works: 1980 - 2018 (Constant Sorrow, 2019)
- Allen Lowe, America: The Rough Cut (ESP-Disk', 2023)
- George Masso, The Wonderful World of George Gershwin (Nagel-Heyer, 1992)
- Butch Miles, Cookin ' (Nagel-Heyer, 1995)
- Butch Miles, Howard Alden, Soulmates (Nagel-Heyer, 2002)
- Geoff Muldaur, Private Astronomy (Edge Music 2003)
- Original Storyville Jazzband Vienna & Randy Sandke, Live at Jazzland (Grove Records, 1999)
- Ken Peplowski, Steppin' with Peps (Concord Jazz, 1993)
- Flip Phillips, Flip Philllips Celebrates His 80th Birthday at the March of Jazz 1995 (Arbors, 2003)
- John Pizzarelli, All of Me (Novus/RCA 1992)
- John Pizzarelli, After Hours (Novus/RCA 1996)
- Ralph Reichert Quartet with Randy Sandke, Reflections (Nagel-Heyer 2004)
- Scott Robinson, Bronze Nemesis (Doc-Tone, 2012)
- Cynthia Sayer, Attractions (Plunk, 2007)
- Cynthis Sayer, Joyride (Plunk, 2013)
- Loren Schoenberg, Just A-Settin' and A-Rockin' (Musicmasters, 1990)
- Daryl Sherman and John Cocuzzi, Celebrating Mildred Bailey and Red Norvo (Audiophile, 1996)
- Mel Torme, A Tribute to Bing Crosby (Concord Jazz, 1994)
- Triangle Jazz Party Boys, Friends in Need 1991 Triangle Jazz Party Boys (Friends in Need, 1996)
- Warren Vaché Jr., Warren Plays Warren (Nagel-Heyer, 1997)
- Warren Vache, Swingtime! (Nagel-Heyer, 2000)
- Jimmy Varro's Swing 7, Afterglow (Arbors Records, 1999)
- Frank Vignola, Off Broadway (Nagel-Heyer, 2000)
- Widespread Depression Jazz Orchestra, Paris Blues (CBS, 1985)
- Bob Wilber, Live at the Vineyard (Challenge, 1995)
- Bob Wilber, The Hamburg Concert (Nagel-Heyer, 1996)
