= Made in Brazil (band) =

Brazilian rock band

- Origin: São Paulo, São Paulo, Brazil
- Genres: Rock and roll; hard rock; glam metal; blues rock; glam rock; psychedelic rock
- Years active: 1967–present
- Labels: RCA Victor, RGE Discos, Vinil, Made in Brasil Records, Sony BMG
- Members: Oswaldo Vecchione; Guilherme "Ziggy" Mendonça; Ivanir "Janis" Venâncio; Marcelo Chaves; Marcelo Frisoni; Octavio "Bangla" Lopes; Rick Vecchione; Solange "Sol" Blessa
- Past members: Celso Vecchione; Cornelius Lucifer; Caio Durazzo; Debora Vecchione; Dimas Zanelli; Fábio Brum; Flavio Augusto; Franklin Paolillo; Hommer; Kim Kehl; Lely Casesar; Mateus Canalli; Mr. Ruffino; Paula Mota; Percy Weiss; Roberta Abreu; Rolando Castello Júnior; Rubens "Rubão" Nardo; Serafim "Fim" Buontempi; Tony Babalu; Wanderley Issa
- Website: bandamadeinbrazil.wixsite.com/bandamadeinbrazil

Made in Brazil is a Brazilian rock band from São Paulo. Founded in the late 1960s, they are one of the oldest active rock bands in Brazil.

It's considered an important 1970's rock band.

It was recognized by the Guinness Book as the active band with the largest number of line-ups in the world, surpassing 200 incarnations with 126 different musicians.

== History ==
The band was formed in 1967 in the Pompeia neighborhood of São Paulo by brothers Oswaldo Vecchione (bass guitar) and Celso Vecchione (guitar).

In 1969, they were early users of artistic make-up in live concerts, painting parts of their body and face.

In 1974, they released their self-titled debut via RCA Victor, which became known as the "banana album" due to a drawing of the fruit on the cover. The vocalist at the time was Cornélius Lúcifer. The band's first hit was "Anjo da Guarda" (Guardian Angel).

In 1975, they released their second album Jack, O Estripador (Jack, the Ripper), with Percy Weiss on vocals and Ezequiel Neves as the producer. It sold approximately 90,000 copies. Durin the Rio de Janeiro leg of the album promotional tour, Ney Matogrosso and Roberto de Carvalho featured as backing vocalist and guitarist, respectively.

In 1978, the band released its greatest success, the album Paulicéia Desvairada. The album pays tribute to poet Mario de Andrade and featured hits such as "Gasolina", "Uma Banda Made in Brazil" and the title track.

In 1990, they recorded the live album In Blues at SESC Pompeia, in São Paulo.

In 2008, they release the album Rock de Verdade! (Real Rock!).

In 2016, they released the DVD 48 Anos (48 Years), recorded live at Centro Cultural São Paulo (CCSP).

In 2017, in celebration of the band's 50th anniversary, the CCSP hosts the exhibition "Viva Made in Brazil" no Centro Cultural São Paulo and the group holds two special shows; one acoustic set featuring João Gordo (Ratos de Porão), Serguei, Netinho (Os Incríveis), Théo Werneck and former members; and one electric show featuring Eduardo Araujo, Gordo, Pompeu (Korzus), Clemente (Inocentes), Serguei, Netinho and former members.

On 12 June 2020, Oswaldo Vecchione suffered a stroke. After a couple of months, he was back live on a wheelchair to perform in the countryside of São Paulo (Mogi Mirim and Amparo), besides a live stream in São Paulo.

In early 2021, the band released a new song called "Minha Banda de Rock (Todo Dia Quero Tocar)" (My Rock Band (I Want to Play Every Day). In the same year, the documentary Uma banda Made in Brazil, directed by Egler Cordeiro, was released.

On 21 October 2023, guitarist Celso Vecchione died of heart failure at the age of 74.

== Members ==
=== Current (as of 2024) ===
- Oswaldo Vecchione — vocals, bass guitar, electric and acoustic guitar, harmonica (1967–present)
- Octavio "Bangla" Lopes — saxophone (1979–present)
- Guilherme "Ziggy" Mendonça — electric and acoustic guitar (2013–present)
- Solange "Sol" Blessa — backing vocals and percussion (2017–present)
- Ivanir "Janis" Venâncio — backing vocals and percussion
- Rick Vecchione — drums
- Marcelo Frisoni — bass and acoustic guitar
- Marcelo Chaves — electric, acoustic and bass guitar

=== Former ===
- Celso "Kim" Vecchione — electric and bass guitar (1967-2023, his death)
- Cornelius Lucifer — vocals; died in 2013
- Percy Weiss — vocals (1975-1979, died in 2015)
- Debora Vecchione — vocals; died in 2009
- Mr. Ruffino — bass

== Discografia ==
=== Studio albums ===
- Made in Brazil (1974)
- Jack, o Estripador (1976)
- Pauliceia Desvairada (1978)
- Minha Vida É Rock 'n' Roll (1981)
- Deus Salva... o Rock Alivia (1985)
- Sexo, Blues &amp; Rock 'n' Roll (1997)
- Massacre (2005)
- Rock de Verdade! (2008)

=== Live albums ===
- Made Pirata - Vol. I (RGE Discos, 1986)
- Made Pirata - Vol. II (RGE Discos, 1986)
- In Blues (Vinil Records, 1992)
- Fogo na Madeira (acoustic, Made in Brazil Records, 2000)
- Fogo na Madeira 2 (acoustic, Made in Brazil Records, 2001)

=== Compilations ===
- Implosão do Rock (RCA Victor, 1975)
- Metal Rock (RGE Discos, 1985)
- Acervo Especial - Rock (BMG, 1992)
- Acervo Especial - Made in Brazil (BMG, 1995)
