= Notre Dame Collegiate Jazz Festival =

Annual jazz festival in Indiana, U.S.

- Genre: Jazz
- Locations: South Bend, Indiana, U.S.
- Years active: 1959–present
- Website: www.sub.nd.edu/cjf/

The Notre Dame Collegiate Jazz Festival is the oldest collegiate jazz festival in the U.S. It takes place every spring at the University of Notre Dame in South Bend, Indiana. The university invites college bands and professional jazz musicians from throughout the country to participate in the weekend event.

In 2016, a female panel of judges was chosen for the first time since the festival began in 1959. The judges were Marion Hayden, Allison Miller, Helen Sung, and sisters Christine Jensen and Ingrid Jensen. The panel was chosen by Larry Dwyer, director of jazz studies at Notre Dame. Dwyer is a graduate of Notre Dame, a composer, band leader, and former high school band teacher who was named best trombonist twice when he participated in the festival earlier in his career.

== Past judges ==
- Bill Evans
- Bob James
- Branford Marsalis
- Cannonball Adderley
- Charlie Haden
- Clark Terry
- Claudio Roditi
- Conte Candoli
- Danny Gottlieb
- Dave Holland
- Dee Dee Bridgewater
- Ed Shaughnessy
- Ellis Marsalis
- Frank Wess
- Gene Bertoncini
- Gerald Wilson
- Herb Ellis
- Herbie Hancock
- Hubert Laws
- Jack DeJohnette
- Jeff Clayton
- Jim McNeely
- Jimmy Heath
- Jimmy Owens
- Joanne Brackeen
- Joe Farrell
- John Clayton, Jr.
- John Lewis
- Jon Faddis
- Lalo Schifrin
- Lew Tabackin
- Louie Bellson
- Malachi Favors
- Marc Johnson
- Marion Hayden
- Nat Adderley
- Paquito D'Rivera
- Pat Martino
- Peter Erskine
- Philly Joe Jones
- Quincy Jones
- Randy Brecker
- Ray Brown
- Red Rodney
- Richard Davis
- Rodney Whitaker
- Ron Carter
- Roy Hargrove
- Roy Haynes
- Sonny Rollins
- Stan Kenton
- Terell Stafford
- Terence Blanchard
- Terri Lynne Carrington
- Tony Williams
- Wallace Roney
- Wayne Shorter
- Wycliffe Gordon
- Wynton Marsalis
- Zoot Sims
