= John Bunch =

American pianist (1921–2010)

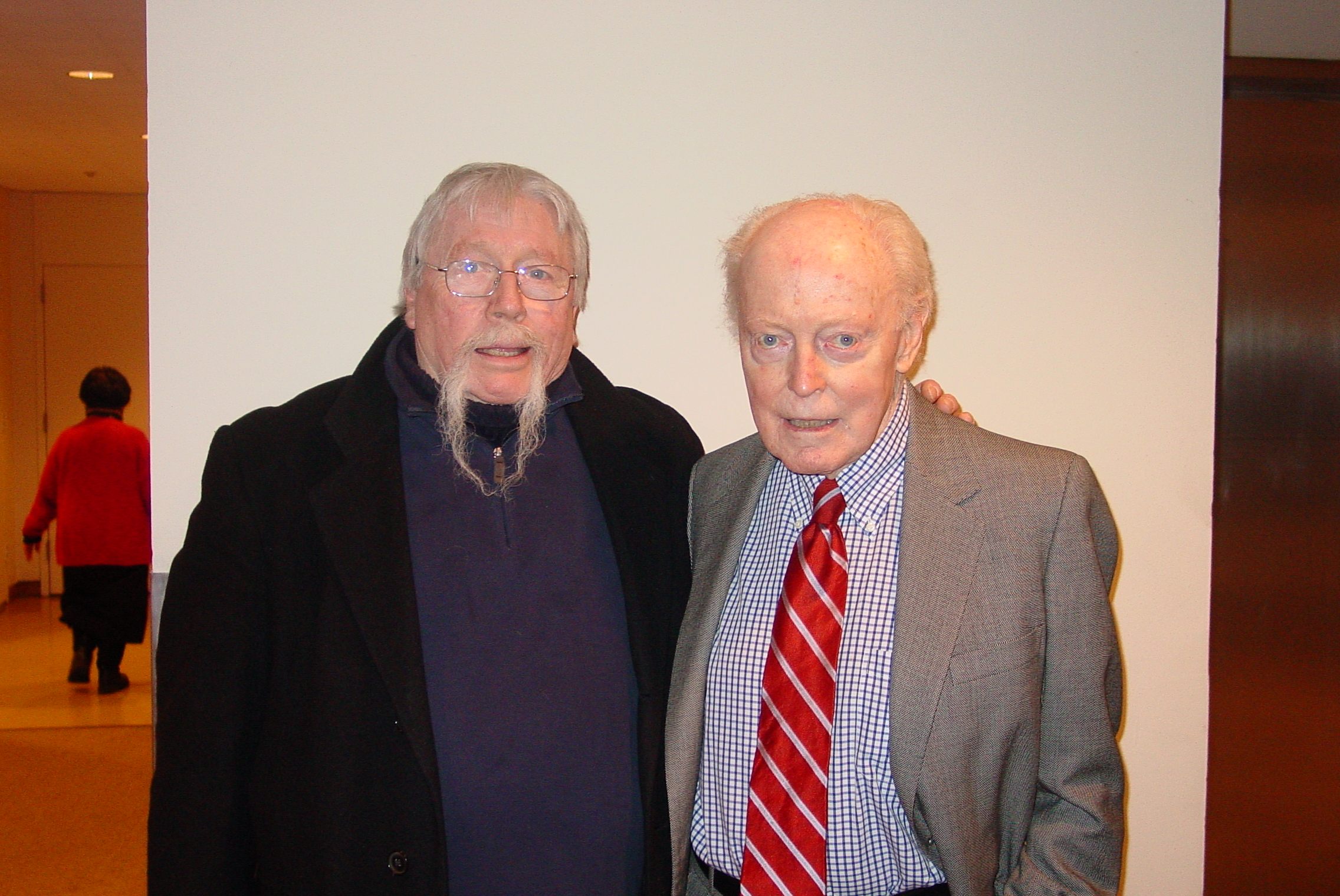
- Dick Sheridan and John Bunch, 2007

Background information
- Born: December 1, 1921; Tipton, Indiana, U.S.
- Died: March 30, 2010 (aged 88) New York City, U.S.
- Genre: Jazz
- Occupation: Musician
- Instrument: Piano
- Labels: Audiophile Records, Chiaroscuro, Arbors, Progressive

John Bunch (December 1, 1921 – March 30, 2010) was an American jazz pianist.

== Early life ==
Born and raised in Tipton, Indiana, a small farming community, Bunch studied piano with George Johnson, a Hoosier jazz pianist. By the age of 14, he was already playing with adult bands in central Indiana.

== Later life and career ==
During World War II, he enlisted in the Army Air Forces and became a bombardier on a B17 Flying Fortress. He and his ten-man crew were transferred to combat duty in England, flying bombing missions over Germany. His plane was shot down on November 2, 1944, and Bunch was taken prisoner. In the prison camp, he learned to arrange for big bands.

After the war, he applied for university training as a music major, but was refused because he could not sight read classical music. He worked later in factories and insurance. In 1956, he moved to Los Angeles where he immediately was accepted by jazz musicians such as Georgie Auld and Jimmie Rowles, who later recommended him to Woody Herman. He settled in New York in 1958, where he joined Eddie Condon and Maynard Ferguson. He recorded with Ferguson and many smaller groups.

In 1966, Bunch joined Tony Bennett as pianist and musical director, and stayed with the singer until 1972. During that time he appeared on Bennett's 1972 series for Thames Television, Tony Bennett at the Talk of the Town. After that, he resumed his jazz work, performing and recording with Benny Goodman, Buddy Rich, Gene Krupa, Pearl Bailey, and Scott Hamilton. He led a trio, mostly in England, and made many recordings as a leader, such as with the New York Swing Trio with Bucky Pizzarelli and Jay Leonhart.

Bunch remained active in Europe and the United States during his final years. He died of melanoma in Roosevelt Hospital, Manhattan, New York City, on March 30, 2010. He was survived by his wife, Cecily "Chips" Gemmell, a former private secretary to Winston Churchill.

== Discography ==
=== As leader/co-leader ===
Year recorded	Title	Label	Personnel/Notes
1975	John's Bunch	Progressive	With Urbie Green (trombone), Al Cohn (tenor sax), Milt Hinton (bass), Mousey Alexander (drums)
1975	John Bunch Plays Kurt Weill	Chiaroscuro	Solo piano; reissue added solo piano tracks recorded in 1991
1977?	Jubilee	Audiophile	Trio, with Cal Collins (guitar), George Mraz (bass)
1977	John's Other Bunch	Progressive	With Warren Vaché (trumpet), Scott Hamilton (tenor sax), Michael Moore (bass), Connie Kay (drums)
1977?	Slick Funk	Famous Door	
1987?	The Best Thing for You	Concord	Trio, with Phil Flanigan (bass), Chuck Riggs (drums)
1994?	Plays Rodgers & Hart	LRC	As New York Swing; quartet, with Bucky Pizzarelli (guitar) Jay Leonhart (bass), Joe Cocuzzo (drums)
1994?	Tributes Cole Porter	LRC	As New York Swing; quartet, with Bucky Pizzarelli (guitar) Jay Leonhart (bass), Joe Cocuzzo (drums)
1994?	Tributes Jerome Kern	LRC	As New York Swing; quartet, with Bucky Pizzarelli (guitar) Jay Leonhart (bass), Dennis Mackrel (drums)
1995	Struttin'	Arbors	Duo, with Phil Flanigan (bass)
1996	Solo	Arbors	Solo piano
1996	New York Swing	Chiaroscuro	Trio, with Bucky Pizzarelli (guitar) Jay Leonhart (bass); in concert
1997	World War II Love Songs	Groove Jams	Trio, with Michael Moore (bass), Butch Miles (drums)
2001?	Love in the Spring	Koch	
2001	A Special Alliance	Arbors	Trio, with Dave Green (bass), Steve Brown (drums)
2002?	Manhattan Swing: A Visit With Duke Ellington	Arbors	Trio, with Bucky Pizzarelli (guitar), Jay Leonhart (bass)
2003	An English Songbook	Chiaroscuro	Solo piano
2003	Tony's Tunes	Chiaroscuro	Trio, with Bucky Pizzarelli (guitar), Jay Leonhart (bass)
2006	At the Nola Penthouse: Salutes Jimmy Van Heusen	Arbors	Trio, with Dave Green (bass), Steve Brown (drums)
2008	Plays the Music of Irving Berlin (Except One)	Arbors	Some tracks trio, with Frank Vignola (guitar), John Webber (bass); some tracks quartet, with Frank Wess (flute) added
2009	Do Not Disturb	Arbors	Trio, with Frank Vignola (guitar), John Webber (bass)

=== As sideman ===
With Benny Bailey

- The Satchmo Legacy (Enja, 2000)

With Buck Clayton and Tommy Gwaltney's Kansas City 9

- Goin' to Kansas City (Riverside, 1960)

With Kenny Davern

- Live at the Floating Jazz Festival
- The Jazz KENnection

With Maynard Ferguson

- A Message from Newport (Roulette, 1958)

With Gene Krupa

- The Great New Gene Krupa Quartet Featuring Charlie Ventura (Verve, 1964)

With Donnie O'Brien

- Donnie O' Brien Meets Manhattan Swing: In a Basie Mood (Arbors)

With Bucky Pizzarelli

- Five for Freddie (Arbors)

With Rex Stewart and Dicky Wells

- Chatter Jazz (RCA Victor, 1959)
