= Mike Jones (jazz musician) =

American jazz pianist (born 1962)

- Mike Jones in 2018

Background information
- Born: August 11, 1962 (age 63); Buffalo, New York, U.S.
- Genres: Jazz
- Occupation: Musician
- Instrument: Piano
- Years active: 1972–present
- Labels: Chiaroscuro, Capri
- Website: jonesjazz.com

Mike Jones (born August 11, 1962) is an American jazz pianist who works with Penn and Teller in Las Vegas.

== Career ==
Jones performed professionally at the age of ten. Following the advice of Oscar Peterson, he attended Berklee School of Music in Boston. While attending the school he started work as a studio musician. During his time commuting from Boston to New York, Jones worked as the on-air pianist and music director of the Nancy Merrill Show. He appeared throughout New England with jazz musicians Herb Pomeroy, Gray Sargent, and Dick Johnson. In 1994 Chiaroscuro released his debut solo album Oh, Look at Me Now, followed by Runnin' Wild recorded live in his hometown of Buffalo, New York, then Live at Steinway Hall. Through his association with Hank O'Neal, he was invited to perform at the Floating Jazz Festival on the SS Norway and the Queen Elizabeth 2. He wrote commentary for the Verve reissue of the album On the Town by Oscar Peterson.

After recording Stretches Out, he was hired by Penn Jillette to become part of the Penn & Teller show in Las Vegas. He wrote the theme for Jillette's radio show Penn Radio. In 2015 he wrote music for and performed in Penn & Teller On Broadway. He recorded the album The Show Before the Show, which was recorded with Jillette on bass. The album is a compilation of performances recorded before the Penn & Teller show in Las Vegas.

In 2014 he signed with Capri, which released his album Plays Well with Others, recorded with Jeff Hamilton. The album has liner notes by Jilette and a cover by David Silverman that is a tribute to the photograph Child with Toy Hand Grenade in Central Park by Diane Arbus.

Roaring includes renditions of music from the 1920s.

== Discography ==
- Oh! Look at Me Now! (Chiaroscuro, 1993)
- Runnin' Wild (Chiaroscuro, 1995)
- Stretches Out (Chiaroscuro, 2001)
- The Show Before the Show (Capri, 2018)
