= The Jazz KENnection =

Studio album by Kenny Davern and Ken Peplowski
- Released: October 30, 2001
- Recorded: October 12, 2000
- Studio: Clinton Studios, New York City
- Genre: Dixieland, swing
- Length: 64:46
- Label: Arbors
- Producer: Mat Domber, Rachel Domber

Kenny Davern chronology
A Night with Eddie Condon (2001)	The Jazz KENnection (2001)	Live at the Floating Jazz Festival (2002)

Professional ratings
Review scores
Source	Rating
Allmusic	4.5/5 stars
The Penguin Guide to Jazz Recordings	3/4 stars

The Jazz KENnection is an album by clarinetist Kenny Davern and saxophonist Ken Peplowski with guitarist Howard Alden.

== Track listing ==
1. I'm Satisfied With My Gal (Sharkey Bonano)
2. Mama's Gone, Goodbye (Peter Bocage)
3. I'll See You in My Dreams (1924 song) (Isham Jones, Gus Kahn)
4. Georgia on My Mind (Hoagy Carmichael, Stuart Gorrell)
5. Careless Love (W.C. Handy, Martha E. Koenig, Spencer Williams)
6. Creole Love Call (Duke Ellington)
7. Chicago Rhythm (Transvestite Dance from the Apex Club) (Ben Kanter)
8. All of Me (Gerald Marks, Seymour Simons)
9. A Porter's Love Song to a Chambermaid (James P. Johnson, Andy Razaf)

== Personnel ==
- Kenny Davern – clarinet
- Ken Peplowski – alto saxophone, clarinet
- Howard Alden – guitar
- John Bunch – piano
- Tony DeNicola – drums
- Greg Cohen – double-bass
