= The Lee Konitz Quintet =

Studio album by Lee Konitz Quintet
- Released: 1977
- Recorded: September 1977
- Studio: Downtown Sound Studio, NYC
- Genre: Jazz
- Label: Chiaroscuro; CR 166
- Producer: Hank O'Neal

Lee Konitz chronology
Pyramid (1977)	The Lee Konitz Quintet (1977)	Lee Konitz Nonet (1977)

The Lee Konitz Quintet (also called Affinity) is an album by American jazz saxophonist Lee Konitz recorded in 1977 and released on the Chiaroscuro label.

== Critical reception ==
Professional ratings
Review scores
Source	Rating
Allmusic	3/5 stars
The Rolling Stone Jazz Record Guide	4/5 stars

Scott Yanow on Allmusic said "the two very complementary saxophonists take explorative solos on eight appealing chord changes, constantly challenging each other. Bob Mover would become much more individual within a few years but on this album it is very much like listening to a teacher and his prize student".

== Track listing ==
All compositions by Lee Konitz except where noted.

1. "Affinity" – 4:14
2. "All the Things You Are" (Jerome Kern, Oscar Hammerstein II) – 8:26
3. "Hi Beck" (Billy Bauer) – 6:25
4. "Waltz for Debbie" (Bill Evans) – 3:13
5. "Lennie-Bird" (Lennie Tristano) – 7:43
6. "Solar" (Miles Davis) – 3:26
7. "I Didn't Know About You" (Duke Ellington, Bob Russell) – 7:20
8. "It's You" – 7:42

== Personnel ==
- Lee Konitz – alto saxophone
- Bob Mover – alto saxophone
- Ben Aronov – piano
- Mike Moore – bass
- Jim Madison – drums
