= Chuck Riggs =

American jazz drummer (born 1951)

- Birth name: Charles Riggs
- Born: August 5, 1951 (age 73); Westerly, Rhode Island, U.S.
- Genres: Jazz
- Instruments: Drums

Charles "Chuck" Riggs (born August 5, 1951) is an American jazz drummer.

== Early life ==
Riggs was born in Westerly, Rhode Island.

== Career ==
Riggs played with Scott Hamilton for many years beginning in 1976; their association lasted well into the 1990s. In the late 1970s and 1980s, he played with Bob Wilber, the World's Greatest Jazz Band, Chris Flory, Benny Goodman, Kenny Davern and Dick Wellstood, Flip Phillips, Ruby Braff, and Jay McShann. He was a member of the Concord Jazz All-Stars (alongside Hamilton, Dave McKenna, and Gray Sargent) in the early 1990s, and worked later in the 1990s with Keith Ingham, Jon-Erik Kellso, and Ken Peplowski.

Riggs was featured on The Cotton Club, the soundtrack for the 1984 film of the same name.
