= The Kings of Jazz featuring Kenny Davern Live in Concert 1974 =

Live album by Kenny Davern and The Kings of Jazz
- Released: August 5, 2003
- Recorded: December 8 to 13, 1974
- Genre: Dixieland
- Label: Arbors Records
- Producer: Mat Domber, Rachel Domber

Kenny Davern and The Kings of Jazz chronology
| Live at the Floating Jazz Festival | The Kings of Jazz featuring Kenny Davern Live in Concert 1974 | At the Mill Hill Playhouse |

Professional ratings
Review scores
| Source | Rating |
|---|---|
| Allmusic | 4/5 stars |

The Kings of Jazz featuring Kenny Davern Live in Concert 1974 is technically a Kenny Davern album, though the ensemble of musicians accompanying him contributes just as much to the overall output. Davern was not the leader here. The recording features notable artists like Dick Hyman and Pee Wee Erwin, among others. This album showcases classic dixieland music with top-notch performers in the genre.

== Track listing ==
1. Royal Garden Blues (6:40)
2. Wild Man Blues (3:42)
3. Rosetta (5:09)
4. Medley: Someday You'll Be Sorry/When Did You Leave Heaven? (2:28)
5. Sweet Georgia Brown (3:53)
6. Black and Tan Fantasy (4:16)
7. (Back Home Again in) Indiana (7:57)
8. Dear Old Southland (3:52)
9. Man I Love (3:21)
10. Savoy Blues (8:44)
11. Fingerbuster (2:32)
12. Buddy Bolden's Blues (2:39)
13. Oh, Sister! Ain't That Hot! (3:58)
14. Love Is Just Around the Corner (8:57)

== Personnel ==
- Kenny Davern - clarinet
- Bernie Privin - trumpet
- Eddie Hubble - trombone
- Cliff Leeman - drums
- Dick Hyman - piano
- Pee Wee Erwin - trumpet
- Major Holley - string bass
- Johnny Mince - alto saxophone, clarinet
