= Dialogues (Kenny Davern album) =

Studio album by Kenny Davern and Ken Peplowski
- Released: May 8, 2007
- Recorded: June 10, 2005
- Studio: Clinton Recording Studios, New York City
- Genre: Jazz
- Length: 61:30
- Label: Arbors
- Producer: Rachel Domber, Matt Domber, Kenny Davern

Kenny Davern and Ken Peplowski chronology
No One Else But Kenny (2006)	Dialogues (2007)

Professional ratings
Review scores
Source	Rating
The Penguin Guide to Jazz Recordings	3/4 stars

Dialogues is an album by Kenny Davern and Ken Peplowski that was released by Arbors Records in 2008.

== Track listing ==
1. "If Dreams Come True" – 7:16
2. "Diner" – 5:47
3. "I Can't Believe That You're in Love with Me" – 5:40
4. "Comes Love" – 9:16
5. "Should I?" – 7:14
6. "Sometimes I'm Happy" – 4:10
7. "High Society" – 4:49
8. "Crazy Rhythm" – 7:02
9. "Nobody Else But Me" – 4:36
10. "Muskrat Samba" – 5:40

== Personnel ==
- Kenny Davern – clarinet
- Ken Peplowski – clarinet, tenor saxophone
- Howard Alden – guitar, banjo
- James Chirillo – guitar, banjo
- Nicki Parrott – double bass
- Tony DeNicola – drums
