= In Concert at the Outpost Performance Space, Albuquerque 2004 =

Live album by The Kenny Davern Quartet
- Released: September 13, 2005
- Recorded: December 12 & December 13, 2004
- Genre: Dixieland; Swing
- Label: Arbors Records
- Producer: Mat Domber, Rachel Domber

The Kenny Davern Quartet chronology
At the Mill Hill Playhouse	In Concert at the Outpost Performance Space, Albuquerque 2004	No One Else But Kenny

Professional ratings
Review scores
Source	Rating
Allmusic	4/5 stars
The Penguin Guide to Jazz Recordings	3/4 stars

In Concert at the Outpost Performance Space, Albuquerque 2004 is a live recording of the late clarinetist Kenny Davern and his quartet, a recording of swinging dixieland music.

== Track listing ==
1. Ole Miss (8:24)
2. Careless Love (6:04)
3. Somebody Stole My Gal (8:17)
4. Summertime (9:40)
5. Spreadin' Knowledge Around (6:33)
6. C.C. Rider (9:18)
7. These Foolish Things (5:00)
8. Royal Garden Blues (10:20)

== Personnel ==
- Kenny Davern – clarinet
- Greg Cohen – double-bass
- James Chirillo – guitar
- Tony DeNicola – drums
