= With Billie in Mind =

Studio album by Teddy Wilson
- Released: 1972
- Recorded: May 1972
- Studio: WARP Studios, New York City
- Genre: Jazz
- Length: 62:31 CD reissue with additional tracks
- Label: Chiaroscuro; CR 111
- Producer: Hank O'Neal

Teddy Wilson chronology
The Noble Art of Teddy Wilson (1969)	With Billie in Mind (1972)	Runnin' Wild (1973)

CD reissue Cover

With Billie in Mind is a solo tribute album by pianist Teddy Wilson featuring tunes associated with Billie Holiday that were recorded in New York City in 1972 and released on the Chiaroscuro label. The album was reissued on CD in 1990 with six additional tracks.

== Reception ==
Professional ratings
Review scores
Source	Rating
AllMusic	5/5 stars
The Penguin Guide to Jazz Recordings	3/4 stars

Scott Yanow of AllMusic states, "Producer Hank O'Neal suggested to the veteran swing pianist Teddy Wilson that he record a set of Billie Holiday tunes since "Lady Day" had cut many of her greatest sides with Wilson in the 1930s. T... Wilson, who is in peak form, clearly enjoyed playing several tunes that he had not performed in years, and he is heard at the top of his game. Classic swing music".

== Track listing ==
1. "What a Little Moonlight Can Do" (Harry Woods) – 4:00
2. "This Year's Kisses" (Irving Berlin) – 3:29
3. "When You're Smiling" (Larry Shay, Mark Fisher, Joe Goodwin) – 2:12
4. "Easy to Love" (Cole Porter) – 3:14
5. "Sugar" (Maceo Pinkard, Edna Alexander, Sidney Mitchell) – 3:07
6. "Body and Soul" (Johnny Green, Frank Eyton, Edward Heyman, Robert Sour) – 3:30
7. "If You Were Mine" (Matty Malneck, Johnny Mercer) – 3:12
8. "Them There Eyes" (Pinkard, Doris Tauber, William Tracey) – 2:26
9. "I'll Never Be the Same" (Malneck, Frank Signorelli, Gus Kahn) – 3:49
10. "I Wished on the Moon" (Ralph Rainger, Dorothy Parker) – 3:33
11. "Why Was I Born?" (Jerome Kern, Oscar Hammerstein II) – 3:45
12. "I Cried for You" (Gus Arnheim, Abe Lyman, Arthur Freed) – 3:31 Additional track on CD reissue
13. "If Dreams Come True" (Benny Goodman, Edgar Sampson, Irving Mills) – 2:33 Additional track on CD reissue
14. "Fooling Myself" (Peter Tinturin, Jack Lawrence) – 3:10 Additional track on CD reissue
15. "Mean to Me" (Fred E. Ahlert, Roy Turk) – 3:21 Additional track on CD reissue
16. "Nice Work If You Can Get It" (George Gershwin, Ira Gershwin) – 2:32 Additional track on CD reissue
17. "I'll Get By (As Long as I Have You)" (Ahlert, Turk) – 3:10 Additional track on CD reissue
18. "Easy Living" (Ralph Rainger, Leo Robin) – 2:31
19. "Miss Brown to You" (Richard A. Whiting, Rainger, Robin) – 3:07
20. "What a Moon, What a Night, What a Girl" (John Jacob Loeb) – 3:00

== Personnel ==
- Teddy Wilson – piano
