= A Night with Eddie Condon =

Live album by Kenny Davern
- Released: May 1, 2001
- Recorded: April 30, 1971
- Genre: Swing; Dixieland
- Label: Arbors Records
- Producer: Matt Domber, Rachel Dombe

Kenny Davern chronology
You Ain't Heard Nothin' Yet (2001)	A Night with Eddie Condon (2001)	The Jazz KENnection (2001)

Professional ratings
Review scores
Source	Rating
Allmusic	4/5 stars
The Penguin Guide to Jazz Recordings	3/4 stars

A Night with Eddie Condon is a 2001 album by clarinetist Kenny Davern originally recorded live in 1971, joined of course by guitarist Eddie Condon. Performing swing and dixieland tunes that night, they are joined by Lou McGarity on trombone, among others.

== Track listing ==
1. "At the Jazz Band Ball"
2. "Rosetta"
3. "Royal Garden Blues"
4. "Ain't Misbehavin'"
5. "Jazz Me Blues"
6. "Rose of Washington Square"
7. "Muskrat Ramble"
8. "I Can't Get Started"
9. "China Boy"
10. "Rose Room"
11. "That's a Plenty"
12. "St. Louis Blues"

== Personnel ==
- Kenny Davern – clarinet, soprano saxophone
- Eddie Condon – guitar
- Bernie Privin – trumpet
- Lou McGarity – trombone
- Dill Jones – piano
- Cliff Leeman – drums
