= At the Mill Hill Playhouse =

Studio album by The Kenny Davern Quartet
- Released: November 4, 2003
- Recorded: May 19, 2003
- Genre: Dixieland revival
- Label: Arbors Records
- Producer: Mat Domber, Rachel Domber

The Kenny Davern Quartet chronology
The Kings of Jazz featuring Kenny Davern Live in Concert 1974 (2003)	At the Mill Hill Playhouse (2003)	In Concert at the Outpost Performance Space, Albuquerque 2004 (2005)

Professional ratings
Review scores
Source	Rating
AllMusic	4/5 stars
The Penguin Guide to Jazz Recordings	3/4 stars

At the Mill Hill Playhouse is a dixieland revival jazz recording by the late clarinetist Kenny Davern and his quartet.

== Track listing ==
1. "I Want to Be Happy" (5:59)
2. "Someday Sweetheart" (8:49)
3. "It's Tight Like That" (6:46)
4. "Wabash Blues" (9:14)
5. "My Gal Sal" (7:22)
6. "Wild Man Blues" (6:24)
7. "My Blue Heaven" (7:31)
8. "Lazy River" (7:18)
9. "Diga Diga Doo" (6:31)

== Personnel ==
- Kenny Davern - clarinet
- Greg Cohen - double-bass
- James Chirillo - guitar
- Tony DeNicola - drums
