= Lee Konitz Nonet =

Studio album by Lee Konitz Nonet
- Released: 1977
- Recorded: September 20–21, 1977
- Studios: Downtown Sound Studio, NYC
- Genre: Jazz
- Length: 61:04
- Labels: Chiaroscuro; CR 186
- Producer: Hank O'Neal

Lee Konitz chronology
The Lee Konitz Quintet (1977)	Lee Konitz Nonet (1977)	French Concert (1977)

Lee Konitz Nonet is an album by American jazz saxophonist Lee Konitz recorded in 1977 and released on the Chiaroscuro label.

== Critical reception ==
Professional ratings
Review scores
Source	Rating
Allmusic	5/5 stars
The Rolling Stone Jazz Record Guide	4/5 stars
DownBeat	5/5 stars

Scott Yanow on Allmusic said "the results are frequently superb".

DownBeat awarded 5 stars to the album. Reviewer Herb Nolan wrote, "There's a touch of everything here, all colored by Konitz' cool nonet sound, without tricks, gimmicks or artistic caution; just a unit using some fine musical minds".

== Track listing ==
All compositions by Lee Konitz except where noted.

1. "Fanfare" – 0:40
2. "Chi-Chi" (Charlie Parker) – 10:56
3. "If You Could See Me Now" (Tadd Dameron, Carl Sigman) – 5:04
4. "Sometimes I'm Happy" (Vincent Youmans, Irving Caesar) – 3:20
5. "Giant Steps" (John Coltrane) – 5:27
6. "April/April Too" (Lennie Tristano/John Eckert) – 4:48
7. "Who You" (Jimmy Knepper) – 7:25
8. "Stryker's Dues" (Sievert) – 5:00
9. "Fourth Dimension" – 3:42
10. "Struttin' with Some Barbecue" (Lil Hardin Armstrong, Don Raye) – 4:44
11. "Hymn Too" – 0:55
12. Jazzspeak: Lee Konitz's Verbal History of the Nonet – 9:35 Bonus track on CD reissue

== Personnel ==
- Lee Konitz – alto saxophone, arranger
- Burt Collins – trumpet, flugelhorn, piccolo trumpet
- John Eckert – flugelhorn
- Jimmy Knepper – trombone
- Sam Burtis – bass trombone, tuba
- Ronnie Cuber – baritone saxophone
- Ben Aronov – piano
- Knobby Totah – bass
- Kenny Washington – drums
- Sy Johnson – arranger
