= Stretchin' Out =

- Cover of 1994 reissue by Jazzology Records

Studio album by Kenny Davern
- Released: 1983
- Recorded: January 1, 1983
- Genre: Dixieland revival Swing
- Label: Jazzology
- Producer: Gus P. Statiras

Kenny Davern chronology
The Very thought of You	Stretchin' Out	Live hot Jazz

Professional ratings
Review scores
Source	Rating
Allmusic	4/5 stars
The Penguin Guide to Jazz Recordings	3.5/4 stars

Stretchin' Out is a 1983 studio album by a trio led by clarinetist Kenny Davern, along with Chuck Riggs and Dick Wellstood.

== Track listing ==
1. "The Man I Love" (7:33)
2. "Summertime" (7:10)
3. "Lover, Come Back to Me" (5:40)
4. "Love Me or Leave Me" (6:07)
5. "There Is No Greater Love" (8:06)
6. "Chicago Rhythm" (6:55)

== Personnel ==
- Kenny Davern - clarinet
- Dick Wellstood - piano
- Chuck Riggs - drums
