= Live at the Floating Jazz Festival (Kenny Davern album) =

Live album by Kenny Davern and Joe Temperley
- Released: January 22, 2002
- Recorded: October 30 – November 4, 2000
- Genre: Mainstream jazz Dixieland; Swing
- Label: Chiaroscuro Records

Kenny Davern and Joe Temperley chronology
'The Jazz KENnection' (2001)	Live at the Floating Jazz Festival (2002)	'The Kings of Jazz featuring Kenny Davern Live in Concert 1974' (2003)

Professional ratings
Review scores
Source	Rating
Allmusic	3/5 stars

Live at the Floating Jazz Festival is a live recording by clarinetist Kenny Davern and clarinetist and saxophonist Joe Temperley, accompanied by John Bunch among others. Mostly dixieland style jazz on the album, though there are some swing arrangements.

== Track listing ==
1. "Bernie's Tune"
2. "Mood Indigo"
3. "Three Little Words"
4. "Blue Monk"
5. "Blue Lou"
6. "Creole Love Song"
7. "I Can't Believe That You're in Love with Me"
8. "Undecided"

== Personnel ==
- Kenny Davern – clarinet
- Joe Temperley – bass clarinet, baritone saxophone
- Michael Moore – double-bass
- Joe Cohn – guitar
- John Bunch – piano
- Joe Ascione – drums
