= The Satchmo Legacy =

Studio album by Benny Bailey
- Released: 2000
- Recorded: November 16 & 17, 1999
- Studio: Van Gelder Studio, Englewood Cliffs, NJ.
- Genre: Jazz
- Length: 54:21
- Label: Enja; ENJ-9407 2
- Producer: Don Sickler

Benny Bailey chronology
I Thought About You (1996)	The Satchmo Legacy (2000)

The Satchmo Legacy is the final studio album by trumpeter Benny Bailey featuring performances associated with Louis Armstrong which was recorded in late 1999 and originally released on the Enja label.

== Reception ==
Professional ratings
Review scores
Source	Rating
Allmusic	3/5 stars

Alex Henderson of Allmusic says, "On this session, Bailey's playing isn't as forceful, aggressive, and brassy as it was in the 1950s, 1960s, and 1970s, although he is still enjoyable and expressive. The Satchmo Legacy isn't among Bailey's essential albums and isn't recommended to casual listeners, but it's a respectable effort that his diehard fans will appreciate".

== Track listing ==
1. "Someday You'll Be Sorry" (Louis Armstrong) – 5:00
2. "Ain't Misbehavin'" (Fats Waller, Harry Brooks, Andy Razaf) – 6:53
3. "West End Blues" (King Oliver, Clarence Williams) – 7:00
4. "After You've Gone" (Turner Layton, Henry Creamer) – 4:39
5. "Basin Street Blues" (Spencer Williams) – 5:57
6. "Pennies from Heaven" (Arthur Johnston, Johnny Burke) – 4:20
7. "Do You Know What It Means to Miss New Orleans?" (Eddie DeLange, Louis Alter) – 6:36
8. "Home (When Shadows Fall)" (Harry Clarkson, Jeff Clarkson, Peter van Steeden) – 7:23
9. "A Kiss to Build a Dream On" (Bert Kalmar, Harry Ruby, Oscar Hammerstein II) – 6:29

== Personnel ==
- Benny Bailey – trumpet, vocals
- Bucky Pizzarelli – guitar
- John Bunch – piano
- Jay Leonhart – bass
- Grady Tate – drums
- Scott Alan Johnson – Executive Producer
- Don Sickler – Producer
- Rudy Van Gelder – Recording Engineer
- Maureen Sickler – Assistant Engineer
- Rudy Van Gelder – Digital Mastering
