= Chiaroscuro Records =

American jazz record company and label

- Parent company: Northeast Pennsylvania Educational Television Association
- Founded: 1970
- Founder: Hank O'Neal
- Genre: Jazz
- Country of origin: U.S.
- Location: New York City
- Official website: www.chiaroscurojazz.org

Chiaroscuro Records is a jazz record company and label founded by Hank O'Neal in 1970. The label's name comes from the art term for the use of light and dark in a painting. O'Neal came up with the name via his friend and mentor Eddie Condon, a jazz musician who performed in what were called Chiaroscuro Concerts in the 1930s. O'Neal also got the name from a store that sold only black and white dresses.

O'Neal ran the label from 1969 to 1977 and produced all but two of the albums. Its catalogue included Earl Hines, Joe Venuti, Teddy Wilson, George Barnes, and Ruby Braff.

O'Neal sold the label to Audiophile Enterprises in 1978, then bought back the catalogue when he started SOS Productions in 1987. Chiaroscuro released new discs and reissues through the 1990s.

In 2011, Chiaroscuro's founders donated the company to the Northeast Pennsylvania Educational Television Association, owner of WVIA-FM-TV, the PBS and NPR member for northeastern Pennsylvania. WVIA-FM used Chiaroscuro's library to start an all-jazz station on its third HD subcarrier, aptly named "The Chiaroscuro Channel".

== Artists ==
- Nat Adderley
- Howard Alden
- George Barnes
- Louie Bellson
- Borah Bergman
- Gene Bertoncini
- Eubie Blake
- Ruby Braff
- John Bunch
- Bill Charlap
- Don Cherry
- Buck Clayton
- Eddie Condon
- Johnny Costa
- Kenny Davern
- Wild Bill Davison
- Lou Donaldson
- Dorothy Donegan
- John Eaton
- Don Ewell
- Bud Freeman
- Don Friedman
- Dexter Gordon
- Al Grey
- Bobby Hackett
- Antonio Hart
- Woody Herman
- Earl Hines
- Milt Hinton
- Claude Hopkins
- Dick Hyman
- Ahmad Jamal
- Gus Johnson
- Henry Johnson
- Dill Jones
- Mike Jones
- Roger Kellaway
- Stacey Kent
- Brooks Kerr
- Lee Konitz
- Jay Leonhart
- Adam Makowicz
- Junior Mance
- Dave McKenna
- Jay McShann
- Michael Moore
- Sam Morrison
- Gerry Mulligan
- Flip Phillips
- Mel Powell
- Zoot Sims
- Willie "The Lion" Smith
- Soprano Summit
- Jess Stacy
- Lou Stein
- Ralph Sutton
- Buddy Tate
- Clark Terry
- Joe Turner
- Joe Venuti
- Dick Wellstood
- Bob Wilber
- Jack Wilkins
- Mary Lou Williams
- Teddy Wilson
- George Young

== Discography ==
- CR101 Earl Hines: Quintessential Recording Session (1970)
- CR103 Mary Lou Williams: From the Heart
- CR105 Bobby Hackett: Live At the Roosevelt Grill (Vol. 1) (1970)
- CR106 Don Ewell: Solo Piano 1967-1973 (1970)
- CR109 Dick Wellstood: From Ragtime On
- CR110 Eddie Condon: Live at the New School (1973)
- CR111 Teddy Wilson: With Billie in Mind (1972)
- CR112 Dill Jones: Davenport Blues
- CR113 Eddie Condon: Town Hall Concerts, Vol. 2 (reissue of material from 1944 concerts)
- CR116 Earl Hines: An Evening with Earl Hines
- CR117 Ruby Braff & Ellis Larkins: The Grand Reunion
- CR118 Earl Hines & Jonah Jones: Back on the Street
- CR119 Dave McKenna: Solo Piano
- CR120 Earl Hines: Quintessential Continued
- CR121 The Ruby Braff-George Barnes Quartet
- CR123 Buddy Tate: Buddy Tate and His Buddies (1973)
- CR124 Wild Bill Davison at the Rainbow Room
- CR125 Borah Bergman: Discovery (1975)
- CR126 The Ruby Braff-George Barnes Quartet: Live at the New School (1974)
- CR127 Don Ewell: Take it in Stride
- CR128 Joe Venuti & Zoot Sims: Joe & Zoot (1974)
- CR129 Dick Wellstood: Dick Wellstood and His All Star Orchestra Featuring Kenny Davern
- CR132 Buck Clayton Jam Session
- CR133 Jess Stacy: Jess Stacy Still Swings (1974)
- CR134 Joe Venuti Blue Four (1974)
- CR136 Dave McKenna Quartet Featuring Zoot Sims
- CR138 Bobby Hackett: Live at the Roosevelt Grill
- CR139 Dick Wellstood: Live at the Cookery
- CR140 National Jazz Ensemble: 1975-1976
- CR141 Tarika Blue: The Blue Path (1976)
- CR142 Joe Venuti And Zoot Sims (1975)
- CR143 Buck Clayton Jam Session
- CR144 John Bunch Plays Kurt Weill
- CR145 Joe Venuti & Earl Hines: Hot Sonatas
- CR146 Mary Lou Williams: Live at the Cookery
- CR147 Joe Turner: King of Stride
- CR148 Bob Wilber and Kenny Davern: Soprano Summit
- CR149 Lou Stein: Tribute to Tatum
- CR150 Teddy Wilson and his All Stars (1976)
- CR152 Buck Clayton Jam Session, Vol. 3: Jazz Party Time
- CR153 Joe Venuti: Hooray for Joe!
- CR154 Eddie Condon: In Japan (1964)
- CR155 Gerry Mulligan: Idol Gossip (1977)
- CR156 Jack Wilkins: Merge (1977)
- CR157 Earl Hines: At the New School
- CR158 Borah Bergman: Bursts of Joy (1976)
- CR159 Willie "The Lion" Smith: Relaxin'
- CR160 Dave McKenna, Joe Venuti: Alone at the palace
- CR161 Bobby Hackett: Live at the Roosevelt Grill
- CR162 Dick Hyman: Fats Waller's Heavenly Jive (1977)
- CR163 Buck Clayton Jam Session, Vol. 4: Jay Hawk
- CR164 Tarika Blue: Tarika Blue
- CR165 Buddy Tate and Dollar Brand: Buddy Tate Meets Dollar Brand (1977)
- CR166 Lee Konitz: The Lee Konitz Quintet
- CR167 Eddie Condon: Live at Eddie Condon's
- CR168 Teddy Wilson Revamps Rodgers & Hart
- CR169 Earl Hines Quartet
- CR170 Jazz Piano Masters: Teddy Wilson, Claude Hopkins, Dill Jones, Eubie Blake (1972)
- CR171 Bob Wilber and the Scott Hamilton Quintet
- CD172: Six By Six: Synthesis
- CR173 Lou Stein & Ray McKinley: Stompin' 'Em Down (1977)
- CR174 John Eaton: It Seems Like Old Times (1977)
- CR175 Dave McKenna: Fingers (1977)
- CD176: Max Kaminsky: When Summer is Gone
- CR177 Jess Stacy: Still Swingin'
- CR178 Soprano Summit: Crazy Rhythm
- CR179 Bobby Hackett: Live At the Roosevelt Grill (Vol. 4)
- CR186 Lee Konitz: Lee Konitz Nonet
- CR187 Abdullah Ibrahim: The Journey (1977)
- CR188 Milt Hinton, Bobby Rosengarden and Hank Jones: The Trio
- CR199 Kenny Davern & Flip Phillips: John & Joe
- CR200 Earl Hines in New Orleans (1977)
- CR202 Dave McKenna (1977)
- CR203 Ruby Braff & Woody Herman: It Had to Be Us
- CR205 Johnny Costa: Classic Costa
- CR206 Ralph Sutton and Jay McShann: Last of the Whorehouse Piano Players (1979)
- CR207 Gene Krupa: Live at the New School
- CR208 Ralph Sutton and Kenny Davern: Ralph Sutton and Kenny Davern
- CR209 Adam Makowicz: A Handful of Stars (1981)
- CR210 Dick Wellstood: Solo Piano
- CR211 Ralph Sutton and Ruby Braff: R&R
- CR212 Clark Terry & The Young Titans of Jazz: Live at Marihan's
- CR218 The Chiaroscuro Songbook: Vocal Compilation (Volume 1)
- CR219 Milt Hinton: The Judge At His Best
- CR221 The Jesse Green Trio: Sylvan Treasure
- CR222 Milt Hinton: The Basement Tapes
- CR223 For Dancers Only: A Lindy Hop Compilation
- CR301 Mel Powell with Benny Carter: The Return of Mel Powell
- CR302 Lilette Jenkins with Doc Cheatham: The Music of Lil Hardin Armstrong
- CR303 Howard Alden and Jack Lesberg: No Amps Allowed
- CR304 John Eaton: Indiana On Our Minds
- CR305 Al Grey: The New Al Grey Quintet
- CR306 Ralph Sutton and Jay McShann: Last of the Whorehouse Piano Players (1989)
- CR307 George Young with Lew DelGatto: Old Times
- CR308 Gene Bertoncini and Michael Moore: Two in Time
- CR309 Clark Terry Spacemen: Squeeze Me!
- CR310 Milt Hinton: Old Man Time
- CR311 Bob Wilber and Kenny Davern: Summit Reunion (1989)
- CR312 Dorothy Donegan Trio: Live At The Floating Jazz Festival (1990)
- CR313 Al Grey: Live at the Floating Jazz Festival (1990)
- CR314 Flip Phillips: The Claw (1986)
- CR315 Roger Kellaway: Roger Kellaway meets Gene Bertoncini and Michael Moore
- CR316 Jon Gordon: The Jon Gordon Quartet
- CR317 Johnny Costa: Flying Fingers
- CR318 Dorothy Donegan Trio: Live with Dizzy Gillespie (1991)
- CR319 Jesse Green: Lift Off
- CR320 Jay McShann: Some Blues
- CR321 Flip Phillips: Try A Little Tenderness
- CR322 Derek Smith, Milt Hinton and Bobby Rosengarden: The Trio
- CR323 Dorothy Donegan Trio: Live with Clark Terry
- CR324 Bob Wilber and Kenny Davern: Summit Reunion (1992)
- CR325 Mike Jones: Oh! Look At Me Now
- CR326 Bill Charlap Trio: Along With Me
- CR327 Flip Phillips: At The Helm
- CR328 Jesse Green: Sea Journey
- CR329 Louie Bellson Quintet: Salute
- CR330 Jon Gordon: Spark
- CR331 The Junior Mance Trio: Blue Mance
- CR332 A Chiaroscuro Christmas
- CR333 John Eaton: Solo Piano
- CR334 Nat Adderley Quintet: Live (1994)
- CR335 Johnny Costa: Costa Plays Gershwin
- CR336 Mike Jones: Runnin' Wild
- CR337 Terry Gibbs: Play That Song
- CR338 Urbie Green Quintet: Sea Jam Blues
- CR339 Bob Wilber and Kenny Davern: Yellow Dog Blues
- CR340 Junior Mance, Keter Betts and Jackie Williams: The FJF Trio
- CR341 Johnny Costa: Dream
- CR342 The Soft Winds: Then and Now 1946-1996
- CR343 Gene Bertoncini: Jobim - Someone To Light Up My Life
- CR344 Kenny Davern and Flip Phillips: Spanish Eyes
- CR345 Jay McShann: My Baby With The Black Dress On
- CR346 John Eaton: Live At Steinway Hall
- CR347 Clark Terry Quintet: Top And Bottom
- CR348 Red Holloway Quartet: Live
- CR349 Bill Charlap and Ted Rosenthal: The Gerry Mulligan Songbook
- CR350 Frank Wess Quartet: Surprise, Surprise
- CR351 Virginia Mayhew: Nini Green
- CR352 Junior Mance: The FJF Trio with Joe Temperley (1996)
- CR353 Jay Leonhart: Great Duos
- CR354 Gene Bertoncini: Live
- CR355 John Bunch, Bucky Pizzarelli and Jay Leonhart: NY Swing
- CR356 Terry Gibbs and Buddy DeFranco: WHAM!
- CR357 The Jay McShann Trio: Hootie!
- CR358 The Johnny Frigo Quartet: Live at the Floating Jazz Festival
- CR359 Junior Mance: The Floating Jazz Festival Trio
- CR360 The Sean Smith Quartet: Live!
- CR361 The Red Holloway Quintet: Standing Room Only
- CR362 Gene Bertoncini and Jack Wilkins: Just the Two of Us
- CR363 Junior Mance's Floating Jazz Festival Trio: Mance
- CR364 Mike Jones: Live at Steinway Hall
- CR365 The Clark Terry Quintet: Live on the QE2
- CR366 The Lou Donaldson Quartet: Relaxing at Sea: Live on the QE2
- CR367 The Henry Johnson Quartet: An Evening at Sea
- CR368 Phil Woods: Voyage
- CR369 Kenny Davern and Joe Temperley: Live at the Floating Jazz Festival
- CR370 The Junior Mance Trio: Music of Thelonious Monk
- CR371 Jack Wilkins: Reunion
- CR372 The John Bunch Trio: Tony's Tunes
- CR373 Dave Glasser: Begin Again
- CR375 Mike Jones: Stretches Out
- CR376 Don Friedman: Hot House
- CR377 John Bunch: An English Songbook
- CR378 Mike Jones Trio: Live at the Green Mill
- CR400 Bill Mays Inventions Trio: Life's A Movie
- CR401 Phil Woods and the Festival Orchestra: New Celebration
- CR2003 Louis Armstrong and the Dukes of Dixieland: Great Alternatives
- CR2004 Dollar Brand: Cape Town Fringe
- CR2007 Eddie Locke: Jivin' with the Refugees from Hastings Street
- CR2028 Ted Curson: Snake Johnson
- CR2029 Dexter Gordon: Jive Fernando
- CR2037 Eddie Harris: Exploration (1983)
