= Solo (John Bunch album) =

Recording by John Bunch
- Recorded: November 4–5, 1996
- Genre: Jazz
- Label: Arbors

Solo: Arbors Piano Series at Mike's Place, Volume 1 is a solo piano album by John Bunch recorded in 1996 and released by the Arbors label.

== Recording and music ==
AllMusic reports that the album of solo piano performances by Bunch was recorded on November 4–5, 1996. Across the 18 tracks, the playing is "alternately upbeat, bluesy, easily swinging, lively and tender".

== Release and reception ==
Solo was released by Arbors Records. The AllMusic reviewer wrote that Bunch's "subtle creativity in giving the tunes little adjustments results in an easily enjoyable set of swing music, one of his best all-around recordings." The JazzTimes reviewer concluded: "Bunch is unfailingly confident and clever, delivering imaginative invention without jettisoning the melodies."

== Track listing ==
1. "Keepin' Out of Mischief Now"
2. "Something to Live For"
3. "Ain't Misbehavin'"
4. "I Gotta Right to Sing the Blues"
5. "Doxy"
6. "Body and Soul"
7. "Isn't This a Lovely Day?"
8. "I've Got a Crush on You"
9. "Honeysuckle Rose (song)"
10. "Isfahan"
11. "Lucky to Be Me"
12. "Bess, You Is My Woman Now"
13. "We Take the Cake"
14. "Jimmy Rowles"
15. "The Boy Next Door"
16. "Sugar"
17. "The Duke"
18. "Sweet Lorraine"
19. "John's Bunch"

== Personnel ==
- John Bunch – piano
