= An English Songbook =

Studio album by John Bunch
- Recorded: February 2003
- Genre: Jazz
- Label: Chiaroscuro

An English Songbook is a solo piano album by John Bunch. It was recorded in 2003 and released by the Chiaroscuro label.

== Recording and music ==
The album of solo piano performances by Bunch was recorded in February 2003. Each of the tracks was written by a British composer.

== Release and reception ==
Professional ratings
Review scores
Source	Rating
AllMusic	4/5 stars
The Penguin Guide to Jazz	3/4 stars

An English Songbook was released by Chiaroscuro Records. The Penguin Guide to Jazz wrote that the performances showed "customary finesse, though over the length of a CD Bunch can seem becalmed with the tempo set a steady musing lope. One at a time, still delightful." The AllMusic reviewer concluded that "Every track is a pure delight for fans of solo piano."

== Track listing ==
1. "I Hadn't Anyone 'Till You"
2. "Pure Imagination"
3. "What Kind of Fool Am I?"
4. "A Nightingale Sang in Berkley Square"
5. "Cherokee"
6. "Play Orchestra Play"
7. "Sunday"
8. "Ziguener"
9. "Just in Time"
10. "We'll Gather Lilacs"
11. "The Touch of Your Lips"
12. "A Garden in the Rain"
13. "If I Had You"
14. "Consider Yourself"
15. "On the Road to Mandalay"

== Personnel ==
- John Bunch – piano
