= Five for Freddie =

Five For Freddie: Bucky Pizzarelli's Tribute To Freddie Green

Studio album by Bucky Pizzarelli
- Released: February 13, 2007
- Recorded: May 9, 2006 to May 10, 2006
- Genre: Swing; Mainstream jazz
- Length: 53:13
- Label: Arbors Records

Professional ratings
Review scores
| Source | Rating |
|---|---|
| AllMusic | 4.5/5 stars |
| The Penguin Guide to Jazz Recordings | 3/4 stars |

Five For Freddie: Bucky Pizzarelli's Tribute To Freddie Green is a jazz tribute album by Bucky Pizzarelli to the late jazz guitarist Freddie Green.

== Track listing ==
1. "Groovin' High"
2. "Bustin' Suds"
3. "For Lena and Lennie"
4. "Up In the Blues"
5. "Down For Double"
6. "High Tide"
7. "Dreamsville"
8. "Shiny Stockings"
9. "Centerpiece"
10. "Corner Pocket"
11. "All Of Me"
12. "Sophisticated Swing"
13. "Lester Leaps In"

== Personnel ==
- Bucky Pizzarelli – guitar, leader
- Warren Vache – cornet
- John Bunch – piano
- Jay Leonhart – double bass
- Mickey Roker – drums
