= The Cotton Club (soundtrack) =

Soundtrack album by John Barry
- Released: 10 December 1984
- Studio: A&R Recording, Clinton Recording
- Genre: Jazz, dixieland, big band
- Length: 42:58
- Label: Geffen
- Producer: John Barry

The Cotton Club is the soundtrack to the movie of the same name. The album won the Grammy Award for Best Large Jazz Ensemble Album in 1986.

== Track listing ==
No.	Title	Writer(s)	Length
1.	"The Mooche"	Duke Ellington, Irving Mills	3:29
2.	"Cotton Club Stomp #2"	Ellington, Mills, Mitchell Parish	2:40
3.	"Drop Me Off in Harlem"	Ellington, Nick Kenny	3:03
4.	"Creole Love Call"	Ellington	3:01
5.	"Ring Dem Bells"	Ellington, Mills	2:46
6.	"East St. Louis Toodle-Oo"	Ellington, Bubber Miley	3:20
7.	"Truckin'"	Rube Bloom, Ted Koehler	2:00
8.	"Ill Wind"	Harold Arlen, Koehler	2:17
9.	"Cotton Club Stomp #1"	Ellington, Harry Carney, John Hodges	2:49
10.	"Mood Indigo"	Ellington, Mills, Barney Bigard	3:34
11.	"Minnie the Moocher"	Cab Calloway, Mills	3:07
12.	"Copper Colored Gal"	J. Fred Coots, Benny Davis	1:15
13.	"Dixie Kidnaps Vera"	Barry	2:37
14.	"The Depression Hits/Best Beats Sandman"	Barry	2:42
15.	"Daybreak Express Medley"	Barry	3:43

== Charts ==
Chart (1985)	Peak position
Australia (Kent Music Report)	68
U.S. Billboard 200	93

== Personnel ==
- John Barry – conductor
- Bob Wilber – conductor, alto and soprano saxophone, clarinet
- Frank Wess – alto, soprano, and baritone saxophone, clarinet
- Chuck Wilson – alto and soprano saxophone, clarinet
- Lawrence Feldman – alto and soprano saxophone, clarinet
- Joe Temperley – alto and baritone saxophone, bass clarinet
- Dave Brown – trumpet, vocals
- Marky Markowitz – trumpet
- Randy Sandke – trumpet
- Lew Soloff – trumpet
- Dan Barrett – trombone, valve trombone
- Joel Helleny – trombone
- Britt Woodman – trombone
- Tony Price – tuba
- Bob Stewart – tuba
- Mark Shane – piano
- John Goldsby – bass
- Mike Peters – guitar, banjo
- Chuck Riggs – drums
- Brian Brake – drums
- Dave Samuels, Danny Druckman, Gordon Gottlieb, Ronnie Zito – percussion
- Priscilla Baskerville - vocalist on "Creole Love Call"
