= Tony Bennett at the Talk of the Town =

- Created by: Tony Bennett; Robert Farnon
- Directed by: Peter Fraser–Jones
- Starring: Tony Bennett; Robert Farnon; John Bunch
- Composer: Robert Farnon
- Country of origin: United Kingdom
- Original language: English
- No. of series: 1
- No. of episodes: 13

Production
- Producers: Peter Fraser–Jones; Philip Jones
- Production location: London
- Running time: 25 minutes
- Production companies: Thames Television; Tony Bennett Enterprises

Original release
- Network: ITV
- Release: 5 July – 18 October 1972

Tony Bennett at the Talk of the Town is a British television series hosted by American pop standards and jazz singer Tony Bennett that aired during 1972. It was staged in London from the Talk of the Town nightclub in conjunction with Thames Television. In the United States and Canada, the programme was known as This Is Music, and was aired in 1974 and 1976, respectively.

The series represented Bennett's ambitious attempt to change how music was presented on television. It featured weekly guest singers such as Sarah Vaughan and Billy Eckstine. It also featured a prominent role for composer and conductor Robert Farnon. Despite the hopes of its creators, no second series ever took place.

== Background ==
At a career crossroads due to the rise of rock music, by 1972 Bennett was in the process of departing from his longtime label Columbia Records for the Verve division of MGM Records (Philips in the UK) and had relocated for a stint in London.

Bennett had always had a strong fan base in England and this had been reinforced by a 1971 concert he gave at Royal Albert Hall with the London Philharmonic Orchestra that had been broadcast by BBC2 in 1972 as the special Tony Bennett Sings. Both the show and the special were well-received and the promoter for them, Derek Boulton, subsequently became Bennett's manager.

== Intent ==
As a follow-up, Boulton negotiated a deal to put on a television series to be set at the Talk of the Town nightclub, a well-known London nightspot known for entertainment. It would be co-produced by Thames Television and Tony Bennett Enterprises. Sir Lew Grade of the ITV network was also involved in production of the series.

During October 1971, Bennett and Canadian-born, British-residing composer and conductor Robert Farnon met in New York to discuss ideas for what the series would be like. The resulting programme would be called Tony Bennett at the Talk of the Town in the United Kingdom and other areas of the world where Thames Television owned it, while it would be called This Is Music in the United States and in parts of the world where Bennett's company owned it.

Bennett had control over the format and other details of the show and felt he was on a mission of "bringing good music back to television." Television shows in the variety format and hosted by well-known singers were commonplace during this era, but aside from a month-long American summer replacement show in 1956, this was Bennett's first-ever attempt at a television show despite his having released dozens of albums by that time. Bennett, who had certainly appeared as a guest on many such programmes, said, "I've been planning this show for fifteen years. I just wouldn't do it until the conditions were right, which they happen to be now."

In particular, Bennett said, "I've cut out all the gimmicks. This means no cue cards, no tv monitors, no phony ghostwritten chit-chat with guest stars. All we're offering are great songs and good music. We've even left in our mistakes, so the shows will have a human touch instead of that plastic look." Bennett also sought out camera angles and other visual approaches that would showcase the musicians in a different light. He had lofty ambitions for the show, saying at the time, "My ambition is to start something, so that others will follow in my footsteps. I want to see music become as big as sports, getting as much. space in the daily newspapers and on tv." And as typical for this period, Bennett complained about the course of popular music – "Today it's a quick buck market – almost like a no–art period. You turn the radio on, and it absolutely blasts you right out – two or three chords; you can't believe it" – albeit praising the contemporary songwriting of The Beatles and Burt Bacharach (material from each of which he would perform on the show). Farnon was generally less critical of popular trends, and praised those who sought to break down barriers between traditional and pop forms.

Taping of the shows began on 23 January 1972. Shows were recorded two at a time, so as to give audiences a little more to come for than just what went into a half hour. Peter Fraser–Jones served as both director and a producer, while Philip Jones was another producer. Bennett and Farnon both praised the work of Fraser-Jones.

During this time Bennett lived on Grosvenor Square with his wife Sandra and their very young daughter Joanna. The last of the tapings was done on 12 March 1972; by May 1972, Bennett had travelled to the United States for an extended concert engagement there.

== Series ==
The series as aired consisted of thirteen half-hour episodes. In the London area, they aired on Thames Television on Wednesday evenings at 10.30 pm and ran from 5 July 1972 to 18 October 1972. In some other parts of the country, different ITV franchises may have aired it at different times, or not at all.

Each show began with a sequence showing a van delivering a bundle of newspapers, with the headline on top of them stating that 'Tony Bennett is in London at The Talk Of The Town', which then shows the lights of the club showing Bennett's name. As the orchestra plays Farnon's composition "A Star is Born", Farnon's voice announces "Ladies and gentlemen, from London – meet Mr. Tony Bennett!" and Bennett steps onto the stage.

The shows themselves were almost entirely musical; at the time Bennett described them as "mini-concerts". Providing support for the singers was a 38-person orchestra composed of some of England's leading musicians. These included Kenny Baker on trumpet, Bobby Lamb and Don Lusher on trombone, Danny Moss on tenor saxophone, and numerous others. There were strings as well, and the orchestra leader was Lionel Bentley. Also included in the orchestra were the members of Bennett's supporting combo at the time, John Bunch on piano (and thereby had prominent role in the show given the style of music being played), Arthur Watts on bass, and Kenny Clare on drums.

Guests for the show included singers such as Annie Ross, Cleo Laine, Matt Monro, and Tommy Leonetti. During one show Bennett remembered having both Sarah Vaughan and Billy Eckstine. Another singer, Sacha Distel, was scheduled to sing on the show but did not appear for the taping.

During production of the show, a mobile sound control room was used with the goal of making recordings that were fit to use for the television broadcast, but that also could be used as the basis for stereo recordings for release.

In addition each episode had a scene outside the club, where Bennett and his daughter Joanna were filmed visiting the sights of London, with the soundtrack playing light instrumentals composed by Farnon. Places so visited included Buckingham Palace, Trafalgar Square, the London Zoo, and Kensington Gardens.

Although Farnon was much less well-known than Bennett, there were dedicated followers of Farnon, members of the Robert Farnon Society, who appeared at the tapings just to appreciate these instrumentals, which included "Melody Fair", "Journey Into Melody", "Portrait of a Flirt", "State Occasion", and a number of others. The propensity of the audiences not to realize that the instrumental compositions were being recorded as these films were shown, and hence to chatter away, annoyed the Farnon Society members no end.

== Episodes ==
These are the episodes that were aired along with the associated guest stars:

- 5 July 1972 – Tony Bennett himself
- 12 July 1972 – Sarah Vaughan
- 26 July 1972 – Billy Eckstine
- 2 August 1972 – Matt Monro
- 9 August 1972 – Tommy Leonetti
- 16 August 1972 – Annie Ross
- 23 August 1972 – Billy Eckstine
- 30 August 1972 – Cleo Laine
- 13 September 1972 – Matt Monro
- 20 September 1972 – Sarah Vaughan
- 4 October 1972 – Billy Eckstine
- 11 October 1972 – Annie Ross
- 18 October 1972 – Matt Monro

Bennett would sing during part of each episode himself, often in a duet with the guest star.

== Americas ==
The announced plan for the American version of the show was that it would appear in broadcast syndication starting in the Fall of 1972 and running into 1973. This does not appear to have happened.

However, This Is Music was broadcast in syndication in the United States two years later, in the Fall of 1974. How widely it was shown is unclear, but stations carrying it included WBNS-TV Channel 10 in the Columbus, Ohio area; WFTV Channel 9 in Orlando, Florida; and WTAF-TV Channel 29 in Philadelphia, Pennsylvania. In foreign markets, a different opening for the show was used.

Around the same time, between August and October 1974, the series was re-broadcast in England, this time typically at 3.55 pm.

Then in the summer of 1976, the series was broadcast across Canada, again under the This is Music title. It was shown on the CTV Television Network on Thursday evenings at 7.00 pm.

== Legacy ==
Bennett said at the time that he hoped a second series would be made, perhaps featuring instrumentalists rather than singers as the guests. However, a second iteration was not to be. In his 1998 memoir, Bennett discussed the show briefly and says he was very proud of the guests he had on it.

In general, the series is not remembered often under either its Tony Bennett at the Talk of the Town or This Is Music name. There appear to be no extant episodes or clips on YouTube, for instance. Neither the show nor did the English sojourn helped Bennett in terms of career trajectory; he found no renewed commercial success overall, and in a couple more years he was without a recording contract.
