= James Chirillo =

American jazz musician

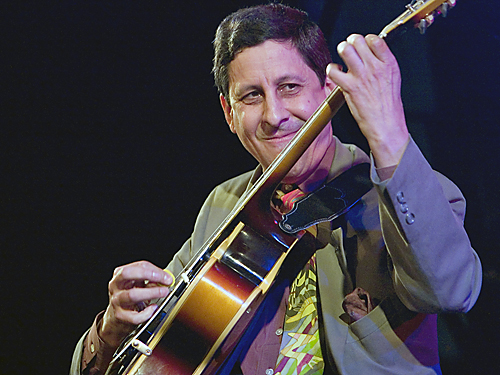
- Chirillo with the Kenny Davern All Stars at the 2004 Breçon Jazz Festival (photo: Barry Quick)

Background information
- Born: James Louis Chirillo; May 2, 1953 (age 73); Waltham, Massachusetts, U.S.
- Genres: Jazz, big band, swing, classical
- Occupation: Musician
- Instrument: Guitar
- Years active: 1974 – present
- Website: james.chirillo.com
- Military service
- Allegiance: United States
- Branch: United States Army
- Service years: 1979–1982
- Unit: USMA Band

James Louis Chirillo (born May 2, 1953) is an American jazz guitarist, banjoist, composer, arranger, and band leader.

== Career ==
From 1977 to 1979, Chirillo performed regularly with singers Marilyn Maye, Vic Damone, Joey Heatherton, Lorna Luft, and pianist Roger Williams. From 1979 to 1982, he was a member of The Jazz Knights at West Point, the jazz ensemble of the United States Military Academy Band, a premier band of the United States armed forces. In 1982, he moved to New York City. He studied and performed with Tiny Grimes. From 1985 to 1986, he was a member of Benny Goodman's last band. From 1987 to 1991, he was a member of the Buck Clayton Orchestra and toured Europe in July 1991. He performed with Claude Williams in President Bill Clinton's inaugural festivities, with Bob Wilber and the Carnegie Hall Jazz Band, Benny Carter, and the Lincoln Center Jazz Orchestra directed by Wynton Marsalis. From 1992 to 1999 he was a charter member of the Smithsonian Jazz Masterworks Orchestra, directed by Gunther Schuller and David Baker.

== Education ==
In 1976, with the One O'Clock Lab Band, Chirillo toured the Soviet Union (Moscow, Volgograd, and Yerevan), Portugal, and England — 5 cities, 25 concerts, 77 encores, 82,800 attendees. The tour was sponsored by the US Department of State as part of a US Bicentennial goodwill arts outreach. NBC broadcast the July 4 concert live from Moscow as part of its US Bicentennial commemorative. While on tour, members of the band held jam sessions with musicians from Moscow, Volgograd, and Yerevan.

After college, Chirillo studied composition and arranging with John Carisi and Bill Finegan. He also studied guitar with Remo Palmier. (Note: Helen Hobbs Jordan (1907–2006))

== Discography ==
=== As leader ===
- Sultry Serenade (Nagel Heyer, 2000)

=== As sideman ===
With Kenny Davern
- At the Mill Hill Playhouse (Arbors, 2003)
- In Concert at the Outpost Performance Space, Albuquerque 2004 (Arbors, 2005)
- Dialogues (Arbors, 2007)
With the One O'Clock Lab Band
- Lab '76 (NTSU Jazz, 1976) (Note: Following Lab '75's Grammy nomination for Best Jazz Performance by a Big Band, Lab '76, received a Grammy nomination for the same category. Both nominations represented the first Grammy nominations to student ensembles of any genre.)
- Lab '77 (NTSU Jazz, 1977)
- Jazz at Spoleto '77 Left Bank (Jazz Society 1978)
- Lab '78 (NTSU Jazz, 1978)
With Houston Person
- Thinking of You (HighNote, 2007)
- Mellow (HighNote, 2009)
- Something Personal (HighNote, 2015)
With others
- Eddie Bert, Walk on the Roots (Mothlight Music, 1993)
- Dan Block, Plays the Music of Duke Ellington (Miles High, 2010)
- Carter Burwell, The Man Who Wasn't There (Decca, 2001)
- Evan Christopher, The Remembering Song (Arbors, 2010)
- Buck Clayton, Swings the Village (Nagel Heyer, 2002)
- John Cocuzzi, Groove Merchant (Arbors, 2011)
- Benny Goodman, Let's Dance: A Musical Tribute (MusicMasters, 1985)
- Benny Goodman, Live, State University of New York (Jazz Heritage Society/MusicMasters, 1986)
- Keith Ingham, Jazz It Up with Bayer (Bayer 1994)
- Keith Ingham, A Star Dust Melody (Sackville, 1998)
- Doug Lawrence, Doug Lawrence Trio with Dave Leone and James Chirillo (Do La Di Jazz, 1981)
- Barbara Lea & Keith Ingham, Celebrate Vincent Youmans (A Records, 2004)
- Joe Lovano, Rush Hour (Blue Note, 1995)
- Cécile McLorin Salvant, WomanChild (Mack Avenue, 2013)
- Cécile McLorin Salvant, Ghost Song (Nonesuch, 2022)
- Bob Mintzer, Homage to Count Basie (DMP, 2000)
- Joe Muranyi, Moon Over Marstons Mills (JLX Kiado, 2008)
- Scott Robinson, Melody from the Sky (Arbors, 2000)
- Cynthia Sayer, String Swing (Jazzology, 2000)
- Randy Sandke, The Re-discovered Louis and Bix (Nagel Heyer, 2000)
- Loren Schoenberg, Just A-Settin' and A-Rockin (Musicmasters, 1990)
- Loren Schoenberg, Out of This World (TCB, 1998)
- Dick Sudhalter, Get Out and Get Under the Moon (Stomp Off, 1990)
- Dick Sudhalter, Melodies Heard ... Melodies Sweet (Challenge, 1999)
- Pablo Villegas, Americano (Harmonia Mundi, 2015)
- Bob Wilber & Dick Hyman, A Perfect Match (Arbors, 1998)
- Bob Wilber & Kenny Davern, Summit Reunion in Atlanta (Jazzology, 2001)
- Claude Williams, Live at J's Part 1 (Arhoolie, 1993)
- Claude Williams, Live at J's Part 2 (Arhoolie, 1993)
- Jack Wilson, In New York (DIW, 1993)

== Performances and broadcasts ==
- Buck Clayton Live: Village Vanguard, February 16, 17, 18, 1990 (Nagel-Heyer, 1990)
- Jimmy McPartland Funeral

Church of the Heavenly Rest, Upper East Side, Manhattan
March 1991
Ruby Braff, cornet; Marian McPartland, piano; James Chirillo, guitar
Jimmy died March 13 and Braff played at Marian's request

- Around New York, CD of radio program broadcast on WNYC; Steve Sullivan (born 1954), host

Stephen Gosling, Zuying Song, piano; Eddie Bert, trombone; Stephen Roane, bass; James Chirillo, guitar
New York City, August 18, 1994; OCLC 174517506

- The Electric Guitar Ensemble, The Super 400, University of North Texas College of Music

"Bye Bye Blackbird," arranged by Chirillo

- Sammy Sherman, Live at Chan's (Arbors, 1997)

(recorded November 7, 1997 at Chan's, Woonsocket, Rhode Island)

- New York Philharmonic at the Cathedral of St. John the Divine), Alan Gilbert, conductor

Memorial Day Concert, Tribute to Kurt Masur
Live at the Cathedral of St. John the Divine, Manhattan, May 30, 2016
Soloists: Wynton Marsalis (trumpet); Thomas Hampson (baritone voice)

2. John Rosamond Johnson, James Weldon Johnson, Bob Cole, "Oh, Didn't He Ramble" (1902)

Other musicians: Marcus Printup (trumpet), Vincent Gardener (trombone), Dan Block (clarinet), Ibanda Ruhumbika (sousaphone), James Chirillo (banjo), Joe Saylor (snare drum), Ali Jackson (bass drum)
OCLC 1050431420

As member of the Smithsonian Jazz Masterworks Orchestra
- Live at Lincoln Theatre, Washington, D.C., August 16 and 17, 1997

Blues and the Abstract Truth: The Music of Oliver Nelson (broadcast on NPR)

- Tribute to a Generation: A Salute to the Big Bands of the WWII Era (Smithsonian Folkways, 2004)

Recorded on various dates in Washington, D.C., in tribute to the following bandleaders:

1. Lionel Hampton: "Flying Home," May 20 & 21, 1995
2. Artie Shaw: "'S Wonderful," June 20 & 21, 1992
3. Benny Carter: " 'Ill Wind," July 19 & 20, 1997
4. Tommy Dorsey: "Chloe," August 12 & 13, 1995
5. Artie Shaw: "Begin the Beguine," July 18 & 19, 1998
6. Duke Ellington: "Sepia Panorama," July 31, 1993
7. Benny Goodman: "Back Bay Boogie," July 19 & 20, 1997
8. Glenn Miller: "The Song of the Volga Boatmen," July 25 & 26, 1992
9. Artie Shaw: "Summertime," July 18 & 19, 1998
10. Duke Ellington: "Take the "A" Train," June 20 & 21, 1992
11. Benny Carter: "Back Bay Boogie," July 19 & 20, 1997
12. Duke Ellington: "Cotton Tail," April 29 & 30, 1995
13. Tommy Dorsey: "Swanee River," August 12 & 13, 1995
14. Duke Ellington: "Rain Check," May 9, 1993
15. Artie Shaw: "Back Bay Shuffle," July 18 & 19, 1998
16. Duke Ellington: "Just A-Sittin' and A-Rockin'" July 18 & 19, 1998
17. Tommy Dorsey: "Hallelujah," August 12 & 13, 1995

Unissued:

18. Jimmie Lunceford: "Blue Blazes," August 12 & 13, 1995

Broadway

- Come Fly Away, March 1, 2010 – September 5, 2010 (188 performances)

== Published music and papers ==
Compositions and arrangements
- "Prelude (to a minor insensitivity)", for the Gotham Wind Symphony (n.d.)
- "March, dedicated to the memory of Bill Finegan", for the Gotham Wind Symphony (n.d.)
- "Love Was Right For Us," lyrics by Tanyayette Charlaisse Willoughby (born 1957), music by Chirillo (1984)
- "When You're in Mind," lyrics Judy Spencer, music by Chirillo (1985)
- "Now I know Why" (1989)
- "Skytime Samba" (1989)
- "Pulsación No. 1," by Astor Piazzolla, arranged by Chirillo (n.d.)
- "Work Song Blues" (1991)
- "God Rest You Merry, Gentlemen," arranged by Chirillo (1992)
- "Manhattan Work Song," for the Loren Schoenberg Jazz Orchestra (1993)
- "Bittersweet" (1994)
- Valse Prismatique, for Warren Vaché and the Scottish String Ensemble

On Warren Vaché's 2006 album, Don't Look Back (see discography)

- Homage Concerto, for clarinet and jazz orchestra, Val-Doc Music (ASCAP) (1996); OCLC 41312302

Composed and arranged by Chirillo
Written for Ken Peplowski with the Loren Schoenberg Jazz Orchestra

1. "Swing"
2. "Elegy"
3. "Driving"
- Grainger Suite (on two of Percy Grainger's tunes (2002)
1. "Sussex Mummers' Christmas Carol"
2. "Hill-Song No. 2"
Papers
- Chirillo, James (October 2002). "Comments About the One-Note Chord Theory".

Interviews

- James Chirillo interviewed by Monk Rowe, New York City, January 12, 2007, Hamilton College Jazz Archive (DVD) (2007); OCLC 895052699, 190787433

== Bibliography ==
=== References ===
- Carr, Ian (1933–2009); Fairweather, Digby (born 1946); Priestley, Brian (born 1940) (2004). The Rough Guide to Jazz (3rd ed.). Rough Guides.ISBN 1-8435-3256-5; OCLC 762959118 (all editions).
1. "James Chirillo". p. 144 – via Internet Archive.
- Denton Record-Chronicle. LCCN sn86-88888; ISSN 2473-8808; OCLC 14198299 (all editions).
1. "NT Lab Band Gets Grammy Nomination". Vol. 73, no. 156. January 23, 1976. p. 4 (Section B).
  1. Via Portal to Texas History.
2. Hopkins, Joyce (née Joyce Darlene Black; born 1945) (July 11, 1976). "Lab Band Happy to Be Home". Vol. 73, no. 295. p. 3 (Section A).
  1. Via Portal to Texas History.
  2. Via Newspapers.com. Archived from the original on May 19, 2021 – via Newspapers.com.
3. Note: Hopkins was Education Writer for the Denton Record-Chronicle.
4. "Lab Band: Members Chosen for Fall Group". Vol. 74, no. 59. October 10, 1976. p. 7 (Section B).
  1. Via Portal to Texas History.
  2. Via Newspapers.com. Archived from the original on May 19, 2021 – via Newspapers.com.
5. Darden, Bob (Robert Fulton Darden III; born 1954) (December 8, 1977). "New 1 O'Clock LP a First-Rate Release". Vol. 75, no. 109. p. 7 (section B).
  1. Via Newspapers.com.
6. Note: From 1984 to 1994, Darden was Gospel Music Editor for Billboard
- Hustad, Thomas P. (2012). Chapter 19: "The Pianists and Growth of Jazz Parties: September 1988–September 1993." Born to Play: The Ruby Braff Discography and Directory of Performances. Lanham, Maryland: Scarecrow Press. pp. 499 & 506. Archived from the original on March 11, 2023 – via Google Books (limited preview). LCCN 2011-51806ISBN 978-0-8108-8264-5 (cloth); ISBN 978-0-8108-8265-2 (e-book); OCLC 802531474 (all editions).
- Kennedy, Gary William (born 1961). "Chirillo, James (Louis)".
1. Via – Kernfeld, Barry Dean, ed. (2002). The New Grove Dictionary of Jazz. Vol. 1 (of 3): "A–Fuzz". Associate eds.: Gary William Kennedy (born 1961) and Howard Willett Rye (born 1947) (2nd ed.). London: Macmillan Publishers & Oxford University Press. p. 433 – via Internet Archive (Kahle/Austin Foundation; Manhasset Public Library).
2. LCCN 2001-40794
  ISBN 978-1-5615-9284-5, 1-5615-9284-6 (US ISBN, 3 Vol. set)
  ISBN 978-0-3336-9189-2, 0-3336-9189-X (British ISBN, 3 Vol. set)
  ISBN 978-0-1953-8699-8, 0-1953-8699-X (Vol. 1)
  OCLC 46956628 (all editions).
3. Via – Oxford Music Online. 2003. doi:10.1093/gmo/9781561592630.article.J537200. OCLC 5576124149.
- Lord, Tom, ed. (November 8, 2018). "James Chirillo". The Jazz Discography Online. Lord Music. Retrieved November 8, 2018. OCLC 182585494 (all editions), 690104143 (all editions).
- New York Times (The). LCCN sn78-4456, LCCN sn00-61556; ISSN 0362-4331, ISSN 1553-8095 (online); OCLC 1645522 (all editions).
1. Wakin, Daniel J[oseph] (born 1961) [at Wikidata] (January 19, 2005). "Devoted Students Rally to Help a Music Teacher". Vol. 154, no. 122 (whole no. 53097). pp. 1 & 5 (Section E). Retrieved October 21, 2019.
  1. NYTimes.com. Archived from the original on May 29, 2015.(blog ed.)
  2. ProQuest 92926067 (print ed.)
  3. ProQuest 432972330 (duplicate print ed.)
  4. ProQuest 2227834214 (blog ed.)
2. Wakin, Daniel J[oseph] (born 1961) [at Wikidata] (April 28, 2006). "Helen Hobbs Jordan, 99, Music Teacher to Generations, Is Dead" (obituary). Vol. 155, no. 223 (whole no. 53563). p. 8 (Section B). Retrieved October 21, 2019.
  1. NYTimes.com. Archived from the original on May 8, 2026.(blog ed.)
  2. ProQuest 93271385 (print ed.)
  3. ProQuest 433325068 (duplicate print ed.)
  4. ProQuest 2226609745 (blog ed.)
- Mosbrook, Joe (2003). "Ken Peplowski" (pdf). Cleveland Jazz History. Chapter 22. Northeast Ohio Jazz Society. pp. 207–211 – via EngagedScholarship@Cleveland State University (open-access institutional repository). OCLC 53463124 (all editions).
- Philadelphia Daily News. LCCN sn87-80181; OCLC 12904443 (all editions).
1. Nelson, Nels (né Nels Robert Nelson; 1923–1996) (March 14, 1986). "Jazz: 'Benny Goodman': Ch 12. Has a Winner". Vol. 61, no. 255. p. 67 (section B).
  1. Via Newspapers.com. Archived from the original on May 19, 2021.
  2. ProQuest 2069923418 (print ed.)
  3. ProQuest 1829466384 (duplicate print ed.)
- "UNT Electric Guitar Ensemble" – "Bye Bye Blackbird". College of Music Program Book, 1998–1999 Ensemble Performances. Vol. 1. Denton: University of North Texas College of Music. October 12, 1998. p. 113 (of 285). Archived from the original on November 8, 2018 – via University of North Texas Libraries, UNT Digital Library, UNT Music Library.
