= No One Else But Kenny =

Studio album by The Kenny Davern Trio
- Released: November 21, 2006
- Recorded: March 19, 2006
- Genre: Swing
- Label: Sackville
- Producer: Kenny Davern

The Kenny Davern Trio chronology
In Concert at the Outpost Performance Space, Albuquerque 2004 (2005)	No One Else But Kenny (2006)	Dialogues (2008)

No One Else But Kenny is a studio album by clarinetist Kenny Davern that was recorded shortly before his death. Davern breaks from his dixieland style in favor of a more swinging sound.

== Track listing ==
1. Sugar (5:24)
2. Moonglow (6:23)
3. No One Else But You (4:59)
4. DBR Drag (5:05)
5. You're Lucky to Me (5:04)
6. Joshua Fit the Battle of Jericho (5:17)
7. Tishomingo Blues (4:38)
8. All by Myself (5:40)
9. Pretty Baby (Clarinet/Piano Duet) (5:49)
10. (There Is) No Greater Love (7:00)
11. Beale Street Blues (Piano Solo) (4:00)
12. My Honey's Loving Arms (5:10)

== Personnel ==
- Kenny Davern – clarinet
- David Boeddinghaus – piano
- Trevor Richards – drums

== Reception ==
Professional ratings
Review scores
Source	Rating
The Penguin Guide to Jazz Recordings	3/4 stars

Jazz Times said while the drum performance was confusing, the collaboration between Kenny Davern and David Boeddinghaus was pleasant.
