= John Bunch Plays Kurt Weill =

1975 piano album by John Bunch

Studio album by John Bunch
- Recorded: May 1975
- Genre: Jazz
- Label: Chiaroscuro

John Bunch Plays Kurt Weill is a solo piano album by John Bunch. It was recorded in 1975 and issued by the Chiaroscuro imprint. When it was issued on CD, tracks recorded in 1991 were added.

== Recording and music ==
The album of solo piano performances by Bunch was recorded in May 1975. All twelve pieces were composed by Kurt Weill. Bunch plays them in a variety of ways: "some at ballad tempo, others with a flavour of stride, some delivered with Monk-like rhythms".

== Releases and reception ==
Professional ratings
Review scores
Source	Rating
AllMusic	4/5 stars
The Penguin Guide to Jazz	3.5/4 stars

John Bunch Plays Kurt Weill was released by Chiaroscuro Records. Its CD reissue added a further five Weill compositions that Bunch recorded in 1991.

The Penguin Guide to Jazz described the album as "a rare and strikingly imaginative project". The AllMusic reviewer wrote that it was "one of John Bunch's finest recordings from a long career".

== Track listing ==
=== Original album ===
1. "Alabama Song"
2. "Surabaya Johnny"
3. "My Ship"
4. "September Song"
5. "Oh Heart of Love"
6. "This Is New"
7. "Westwind"
8. "Lost in the Stars"
9. "No Place to Go but Up"
10. "Le Roi d'Aquitaine"
11. "Johnny's Song"
12. "Speak Low"

=== CD release ===
Five tracks were added to the original twelve:

1. "It Never Was You"
2. "There'll Be Life, Love & Laughter"
3. "Here I'll Stay"
4. "What Good Would the Moon Be"
5. "Moon-Faced, Starry-Eyed"

== Personnel ==
- John Bunch – piano
