= Joe Temperley =

Scottish jazz saxophonist (1929–2016)

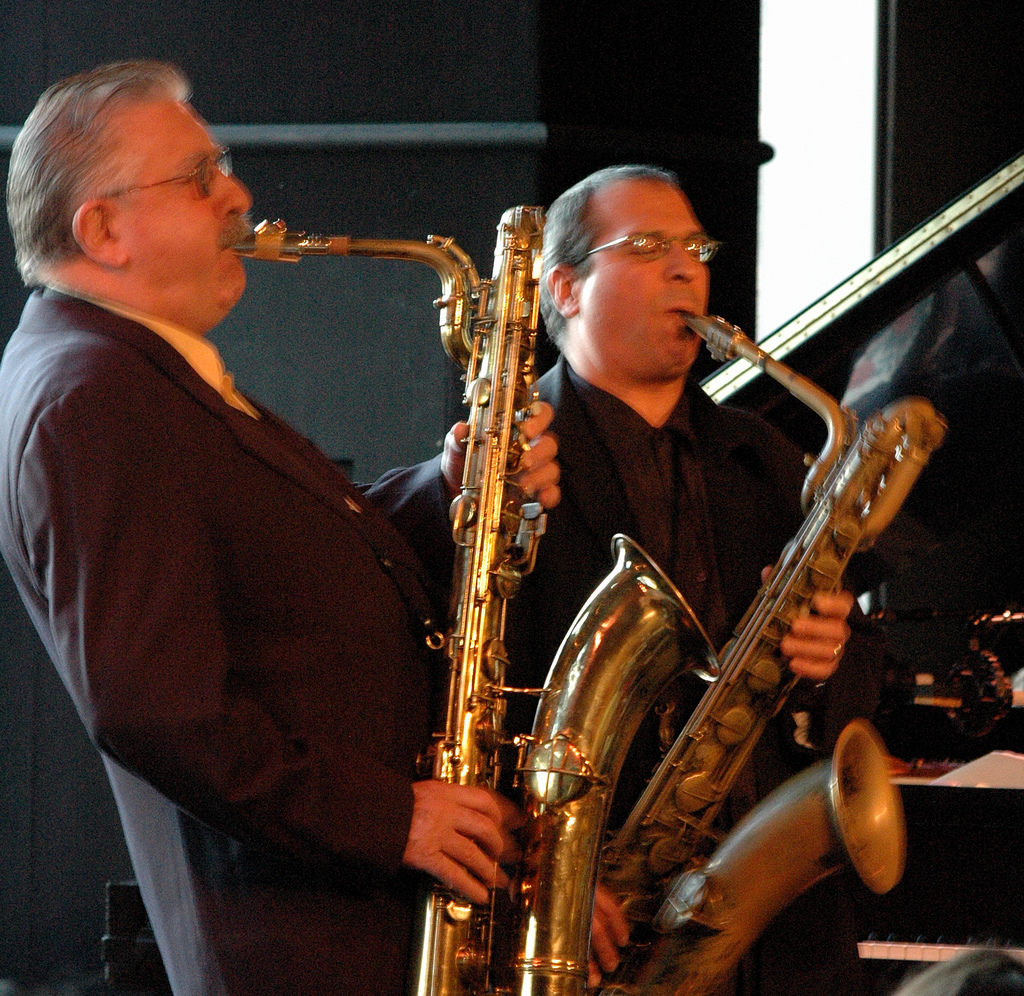
- Temperley (left) and Gary Smulyan in November 2005

Background information
- Born: 20 September 1929; Cowdenbeath, Scotland
- Died: 11 May 2016 (aged 86) New York City, United States
- Genres: Jazz
- Occupation: Musician
- Instruments: Baritone saxophone, soprano saxophone, bass clarinet
- Years active: 1950s–2015

Joe Temperley (20 September 1929 – 11 May 2016) was a Scottish jazz saxophonist. He performed with various instruments, but was most associated with the baritone saxophone, soprano saxophone, and bass clarinet.

== Life ==
Temperley was born in Cowdenbeath, Scotland, and grew up in Lochgelly. His father was a bus driver.

Temperley started to play cornet around the age of 12, then started on saxophone at the age of 14. Six months later, he got his first job at the Glasgow-based Tommy Sampson's Orchestra, having previously played in local dance bands. He joined Humphrey Lyttelton's London-based band in 1957 and stayed until 1965, when he moved to the US. After six months, he was recruited by Woody Herman, with whom he toured for two years.

He also performed or recorded with Buddy Rich, Joe Henderson, Duke Pearson, the Jazz Composer's Orchestra, The Thad Jones/Mel Lewis Orchestra, and Clark Terry among many others. In October 1974, he toured and recorded with the Duke Ellington Orchestra as a replacement for Harry Carney.

During the 1980s, Temperley played in the Broadway show Sophisticated Ladies; and his film soundtrack credits included Cotton Club, Biloxi Blues, Brighton Beach Memoirs, When Harry Met Sally..., and Tune in Tomorrow, the latter composed by Wynton Marsalis.

He was a guest mentor of the Fife Youth Jazz Orchestra programme in Scotland. He was an original member of the Jazz at Lincoln Center Orchestra, and served on the faculty of the Juilliard School for Jazz Studies.

Temperley died of kidney failure and cancer in New York City on 11 May 2016, aged 86.

== Discography ==
=== As leader ===
- Just Friends with Jimmy Knepper (Hep, 1979)
- When You're Smiling with Benny Waters (Hep, 1981)
- Concerto for Joe (Hep, 1995)
- Sunbeam and Thundercloud with Dave McKenna (Concord Jazz, 1996)
- With Every Breath (Hep, 1998)
- Double Duke (Naxos, 1999)
- Live at the Floating Jazz Festival with Kenny Davern (Chiaroscuro, 2000)
- Saxploitation with Kathy Stobart (Spotlite, 2001)
- Monk with Junior Mance (Chiaroscuro, 2003)

=== As sideman ===
With Buck Clayton

- The Great Buck Clayton (Polydor, 1964)
- A Buck Clayton Jam Session (Chiaroscuro, 1974)
- A Buck Clayton Jam Session Vol. IV (Chiaroscuro, 1977)
- A Swingin' Dream (Stash, 1989)

With Eumir Deodato

- Deodato 2 (CTI, 1973)
- Whirlwinds (MCA, 1974)
- In Concert (CTI, 1974)

With Duke Ellington Orchestra

- Continuum (Fantasy, 1976)
- Music Is My Mistress (Musicmasters, 1989)
- Four Symphonic Works by Duke Ellington (Musical Heritage Society, 1989)
- Thank You Uncle Edward (Renma, 2007)

With Wynton Marsalis and Jazz at Lincoln Center Orchestra

- Crescent City Christmas Card (Columbia, 1989)
- Tune in Tomorrow (Columbia, 1990)
- Portraits by Ellington (Columbia, 1992)
- Big Train (Columbia/Sony, 1999)
- Live in Swing City, Swingin' with Duke (Columbia, 1999)
- Essentially Ellington 2000 (Warner, 2000)
- Plays the Music of Duke Ellington (Brooks Brothers, 2004)
- A Love Supreme (Palmetto, 2004)
- Cast of Cats (Brooks Brothers, 2004)
- Don't Be Afraid...the Music of Charles Mingus (Palmetto, 2005)
- Vitoria Suite (EmArcy, 2010)
- Portrait in Seven Shades (Jazz at Lincoln Center, 2010)
- Live in Cuba (Blue Engine, 2016)

With Humphrey Lyttelton

- Humph in Perspective (Parlophone, 1958)
- Blues in the Night (Columbia, 1960)
- Hump and Friends (Metronome, 1961)
- Late Night Final (Columbia, 1963)
- Humphrey Lyttelton and His Band (Society, 1965)
- Duke Ellington Classics (Black Lion, 1971)
- Humph Dedicates (Vocalion, 2005)

With others

- John Barry, The Cotton Club (Geffen, 1984)
- Luiz Bonfa, Manhattan Strut (Paddle Wheel, 1997)
- Ann Hampton Callaway, To Ella with Love (After 9, 1996)
- Benny Carter, Over the Rainbow (Musicmasters, 1989)
- Betty Carter, The Music Never Stops (Blue Engine, 2019)
- Aaron Diehl, Space Time Continuum (Mack Avenue, 2015)
- Victor Feldman, In London Vol. 2 Big Band (Tempo, 1957)
- Wycliffe Gordon, Slidin' Home (Nagel Heyer, 1999)
- Scott Hamilton & Warren Vaché Jr., Skyscrapers (Concord Jazz, 1980)
- Michael Hashim, Multi-Coloured Blue (Hep, 1999)
- Joe Henderson, Big Band (Verve, 1996)
- Jon Hendricks, Freddie Freeloader (Denon, 1990)
- Woody Herman, Woody Live East and West (Columbia, 1967)
- Dick Hyman, From the Age of Swing (Reference, 1994)
- The Thad Jones/Mel Lewis Orchestra, Central Park North (Solid State, 1969)
- The Thad Jones/Mel Lewis Orchestra, The Groove Merchant (LaserLight 1999)
- O'Donel Levy, Everything I Do Gonna Be Funky (Groove Merchant, 1974)
- Gerry Mulligan, Walk on the Water (DRG, 1980)
- Ted Nash, Presidential Suite: Eight Variations on Freedom (Motema, 2016)
- Paula West, Come What May (Hi Horse, 2001)
- Ernie Wilkins, Hard Mother Blues (Mainstream, 1970)
- Ernie Wilkins, Screaming Mothers (Mainstream, 1974)
- Anthony Wilson, Goat Hill Junket (Mama, 1998)
- Glenn Zottola, Christmas in Jazztime (Dreamstreet, 1986)
