= Gray Sargent =

American jazz musician

Gray Sargent (born June 10, 1953, Attleboro, Massachusetts) is an American jazz guitarist.

Sargent learned to play piano before picking up guitar at age 11. He played with Illinois Jacquet on and off between 1975 and 1990, and began working with Dave McKenna in the early 1980s, with whom he would work well into the 1990s. He took a position as artist-in-residence at Harvard in the academic year 1988–1989. He has performed and/or recorded with Ruby Braff, Donna Byrne, Benny Carter, Arnett Cobb, Lou Colombo, Vic Dickenson, Scott Hamilton, Peanuts Hucko, Billy Novick, Herb Pomeroy, Chuck Riggs, Buddy Tate, Frank Wess, Bob Wilber, Marshall Wood, Phil Woods, Tony Bennett, in addition to working in large orchestras under the direction of George Wein (Newport Jazz Festival All-Stars, 1989) and Dick Johnson (Artie Shaw Orchestra, 1990s).

Sargent was a member of the Tony Bennett Quartet for 24 years, from 1997 to 2021, including Bennett's final performances with Lady Gaga.
