= Shelley M. Shier =

Shelley M. Shier is a Canadian-American entrepreneur, art consultant, curator, music and theatrical producer.

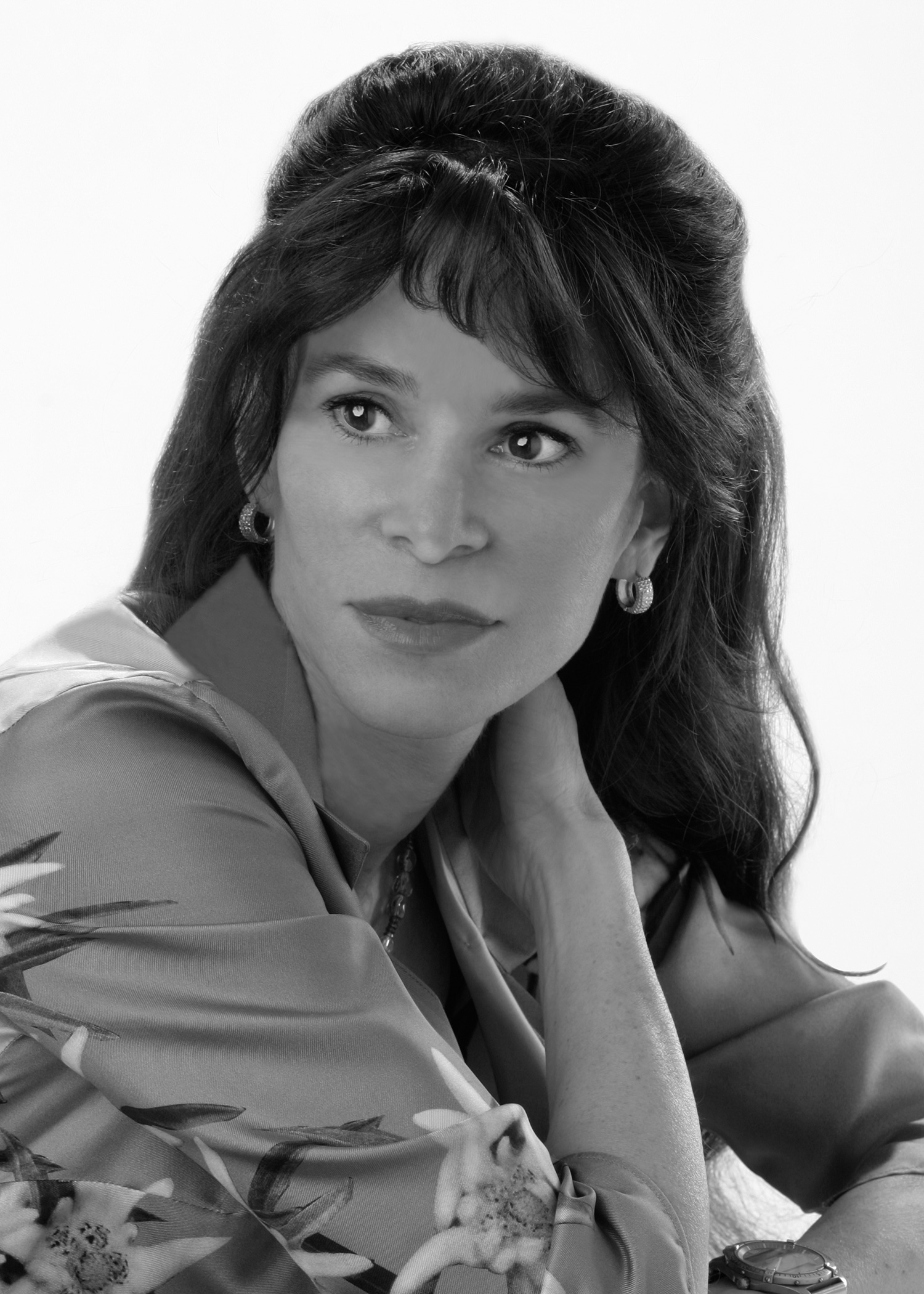
Shelley M. Shier by Tom Caravaglia 2004

== Early life ==
Her mother, Rosaline Cutler Shier Sonshine, remains socially active, primarily in various charities and as an award winning sponsor of law enforcement initiative in Toronto, Ontario, Canada. Her father, Harry Shier was a noted Canadian industrialist (OSF) and investor with strong ties to the entertainment industry. Shier lived in Toronto, but also Miami and New York City. Her extended family, includes her stepfather, Harry Sonshine, an industrialist and sports figure, her stepmother, Roni Chesler Shier, and her step grandfather, Lou Chesler, an entrepreneur active in real estate development (Freeport), and entertainment (Warner Bros.-Seven Arts). Shier attended Branksome Hall in Toronto and later studied for four years with Stella Adler in New York City. She became a US citizen in 2005.

Shier left Canada to study with Stella Adler in New York (1976-1980) and graduated from the Conservatory of Acting at City Center. At the same time she was a company member of The Soho Artist's Theater for five years. During this time she supported herself working for New York City art galleries and with private clients at Sotheby's and Christie's.

== Career ==
In 1983, Shier formed HOSS, Inc. a production company that over the next twenty five years produced hundreds of music festivals (The Floating Jazz Festival, The Blues Cruise), concerts (Tony Bennett, Tommy Tune, Debbie Reynolds), and theatrical productions (Sweet Charity, I Do! I Do!, Hair, Jesus Christ Superstar) throughout the world.

In the mid-1990s Shier produced and toured, Hair, Jesus Christ Superstar and Sgt. Pepper's Lonely Hearts Club Band in conjunction with the original Broadway director, Tom O'Horgan. In following years, working with Gwen Verdon and Grover Dale and the Bob Fosse Estate, she presented Sweet Charity and A Tribute to Bob Fosse. Simultaneously, she produced I Do, I Do and A Tribute To Marge and Gower Champion, working with the legendary Marge Champion. In 1996 she produced a series of special events for the Barcelona Olympics. In 1998 she formed Broadway Bound, Inc. and the following year established a theatrical company aboard the legendary ocean liner Queen Elizabeth 2. Over the next six years she produced, wrote and toured six new shows. Her production of Enter The Guardsman was produced simultaneously on the QE2 and New York's Vineyard Theater.

In 2006, Shier expanded Broadway Bound, creating Broadway Bound Fine Arts and Entertainment to include a Fine Arts Division to orchestrate the acquisition of a wide range of art works, paintings, sculpture, and photography, for indoor and outdoor installations. These installations include large-scale projects in public places, intimate exhibitions, as well as artwork for residential spaces and premium hotels worldwide. Among Shier's recent projects is the creation and development of the Pride of Canada Carousel, a multimillion-dollar fine art carousel commissioned by the Remington Group, that is the artistic centerpiece of Downtown Markham, a new city, outside Toronto, Ontario. The Pride of Canada Carousel opened to great critical acclaim on Canada Day, July 1, 2016. On December 13, 2018, Prime Minister Justin Trudeau visited The Pride of Canada Carousel in Downtown Markham as part of the Christmas event festivities. Shier is also developing ground breaking interior and exterior art installations worldwide. The Toronto Marriott Markham Hotel is her latest project, and features an extensive collection of public art. Shier continues to work closely with a number of visual artists and has been instrumental in arranging exhibitions for them in New York City, Los Angeles, San Francisco, Philadelphia, Pittsburgh and Dallas, Toronto and Oslo.

== Humanitarian causes ==
When not developing large-scale art projects, photography exhibits, musical, theatrical and film productions, or integrating new artistic properties, Shier devotes much of her time to charitable causes, including special events for Save The Children, The Jazz Gallery and The Jazz Foundation of America. A Black Belt in karate, in addition to teaching karate and kickboxing, she is also an accomplished equestrian. Shelley is a member of Music On The Inside, Harmony and Hope in Criminal Justice, The Blues Foundation, and The National Alliance of Musical Theater.
