= Bernie Privin =

American pioneer of broadcasting media

Bernard Privin
- Born: February 12, 1919; New York City
- Died: October 8, 1999 (aged 80); New York
- Resting place: Mount Lebanon Cemetery, Glendale, Queens, New York, United States
- Citizenship: American
- Occupation: Trumpeter
- Employers: National Broadcasting Company; CBS
- Spouse: Ethel Rubenstein (m. 1939)
- Children: 2
- Relatives: Eugene Lyons, David Sarnoff, Richard Baer, Bruce J. Oreck
- Military career
- Allegiance: United States
- Branch: United States Army
- Service years: 1943–1946
- Conflicts: World War II

Bernard Privin (February 12, 1919 – October 8, 1999) was an American jazz trumpeter.

== Early life ==
Privin was born in New York City, United States. His father, Alter Privin, was a Jewish immigrant from Eastern Europe.

== Career ==
Privin was an autodidact on trumpet, and played professionally while in his teens. When he was 13, he bought a trumpet the day after he heard Louis Armstrong perform. He became a member of Harry Reser's band in 1937, and in the same year also worked with Bunny Berigan and Tommy Dorsey. In 1938, he joined the orchestra of Artie Shaw, and then worked with Charlie Barnet, Mal Hallett, and Benny Goodman. He was drafted in 1943 and played from 1943 to 1946 with the Glenn Miller Army Air Force Band in Europe. After returning to the United States, he worked with Goodman once more, then became a staff musician for radio and television; he worked with NBC for two years and then CBS, the latter well into the 1960s. Concomitantly he played as a session musician, especially with Goodman throughout the 1950s, as well as for musicians such as Sy Oliver and Al Caiola.

Privin played frequently in Europe from the 1960s onward; he played in Sweden multiple times in the 1960s, and was a member of the Tommy Dorsey Orchestra, under the direction of Warren Covington and Pee Wee Erwin, for tours of Europe in the mid-1970s. He was a member of the New York Jazz Repertory Company when it toured the Soviet Union in 1975.

== Personal life ==
He died in October 1999, in White Plains, New York, at the age of 80.

== Bibliography ==
- Brian Peerless, "Bernie Privin". The New Grove Dictionary of Jazz. 2nd edition, ed. Barry Kernfeld, 2004.
