= Jay Leonhart =

American double bassist and singer-songwriter

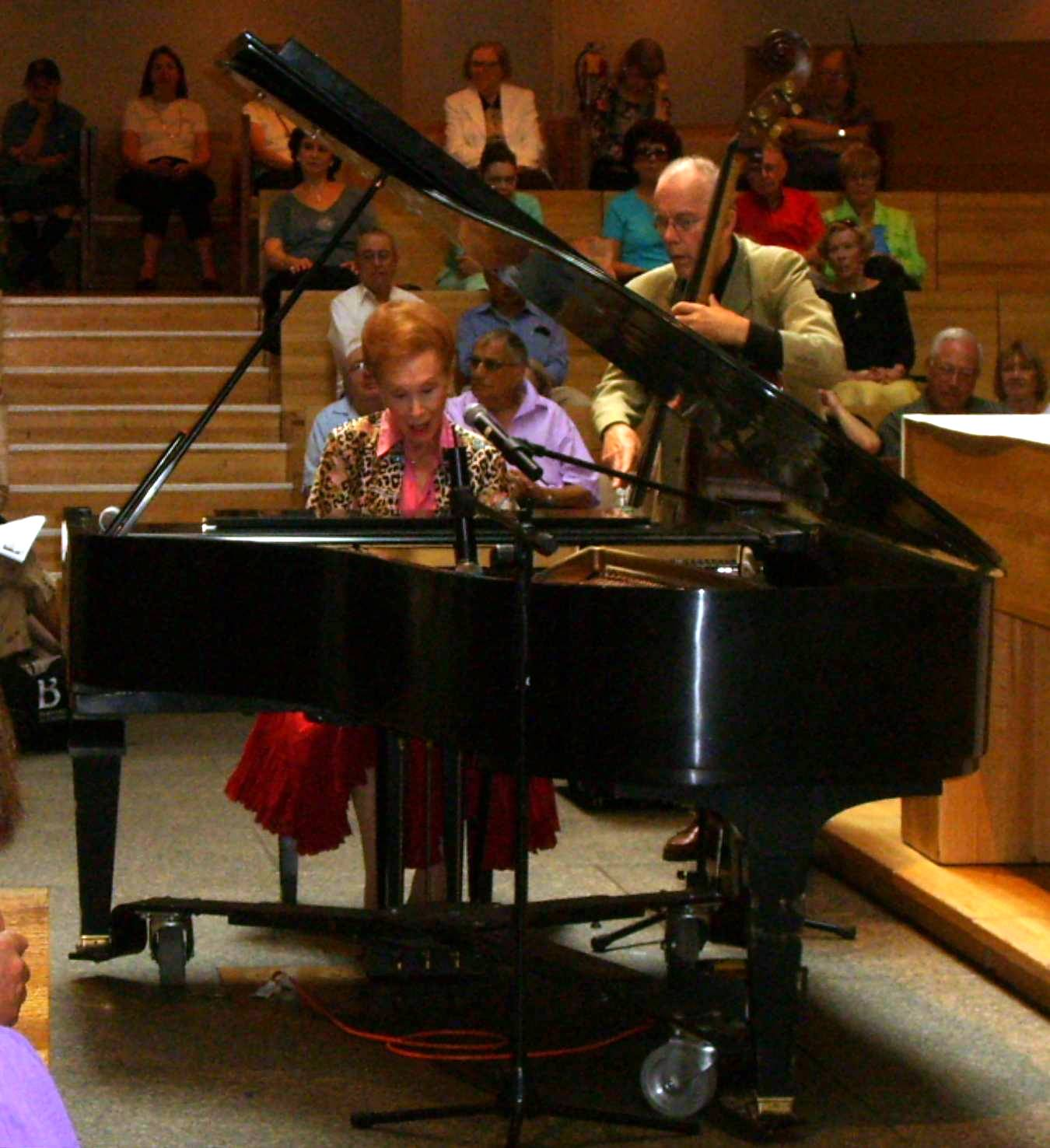
- Leonhart, right, with Barbara Carroll

Background information
- Born: James Chancellor Leonhart; December 6, 1940 (age 85); Baltimore, Maryland, U.S.
- Genres: Jazz, pop
- Occupation: Musician
- Instrument: Double bass
- Years active: 1960–present
- Labels: DMP, Sunnyside, Charioscuro
- Website: jayleonhart.com

Jay Leonhart (born December 6, 1940) is an American double bassist, singer, and songwriter who has worked in jazz and popular music. He has performed with Judy Garland, Bucky Pizzarelli, Carly Simon, Frank Sinatra, and Sting. Leonhart is noted for his clever songwriting, often laced with dry humor. His compositions have been recorded by Blossom Dearie, Lee Konitz, and Gary Burton. His poetry is published both in, and outside of, the venue of song.

== Career ==
Leonhart grew up in a musical family. His parents and six siblings were all musically inclined. Everyone played the piano. By the age of seven, he and his older brother Bill were playing banjo, guitar, mandolin, and bass. They played country music and jazz. In their early teens, they were on TV in Baltimore and toured the country performing on banjo. When Leonhart was fourteen he started playing double bass in the Pier Five Dixieland Jazz Band in Baltimore.

After studying at the Peabody Institute (1946–1950), he attended the Berklee College of Music (1959–1961) and the Advanced School of Contemporary Music in Toronto.

In the early 1960s, he worked with Mike Longo and Buddy Morrow. At twenty one, he moved to New York City to start his career. He played road gigs with big bands, small bands, and singers. In 1968, he met and married a singer named Donna Zier and settled in New York.

Leonhart has worked with Louie Bellson, Urbie Green, Jim Hall, Lee Konitz, Marian McPartland, Gerry Mulligan, Mike Renzi, Don Sebesky, Chuck Wayne, and Phil Woods., Thad Jones, Mel Lewis, Lou Marini, and Tony Bennett. He has worked as a studio musician in several genres, for musicians such as James Taylor, Ozzy Osbourne, and Queen Latifah. He has also played in a duo with trombonist Wycliffe Gordon.

Between 1975 and 1995, he was named Most Valuable Bassist in the recording industry three times by the National Academy of Recording Arts and Sciences.

Leonhart has recorded many solo albums and has performed a one-man show called "The Bass Lesson" about his life in the music business. He has toured worldwide for more than forty years. He appeared on Marian McPartland's Piano Jazz in the fall of 2001.

His son and daughter, Michael and Carolyn, have worked often with Steely Dan.

== Discography ==
=== As Bassist and Singer ===
- Salamander Pie with Mike Renzi (DMP, 1983)
- There's Gonna Be Trouble with Joe Beck (Sunnyside, 1984)
- The Double Cross( Sunnyside, 1988)
- Life Out on the Road: A Jazz Journey (Prestige Elite, 1990)
- Two Lane Highways (Prestige Elite, 1992)
- Live at Fat Tuesday's: May 13–15, 1993 (DRG, 1993)
- Galaxies and Planets (Sons of Sound, 2001)
- Rodgers & Leonhart (Sons of Sound, 2002)
- Cool (Sons of Sound, 2004)
- The Bass Lesson (Chancellor Music, 2015)
- Don't You Wish (Chancellor Music, 2017)
- Joy (Sunnyside Communications, 2019)

=== As leader on mainly instrumental albums ===
- Four Duke with Joe Beck, Gary Burton, Terry Clarke (LaserLight, 1995)
- At Duke's Place with Jane Jarvis (Progressive Records, 1996)
- Sensitive to the Touch: The Music of Harold Arlen with Ken Peplowski (Groove Jams, 1998)
- Live at the 1996 Floating Jazz Festival with Bucky Pizzarelli, John Bunch (Chiaroscuro, 1998)
- Great Duets (Chiaroscuro, 1999)
- Tony's Tunes with John Bunch, Bucky Pizzarelli (Chiaroscuro, 2003)
- Fly Me to the Moon (Venus, 2004)
- Lost Songs of 1936 with Bucky Pizzarelli, Dick Hyman (Victoria, 2006)

With The New York Trio

- Blues in the Night (Venus, 2001)
- The Things We Did Last Summer (Venus, 2002)
- Love You Madly (Venus, 2003)
- Stairway to the Stars (Venus, 2004)
- Begin the Beguine (Venus, 2006)
- Thou Swell (Venus, 2007)
- Always (Venus, 2008)
- Stardust (Venus, 2009)

Main Source: Allmusic

=== As guest ===
Main Source: Allmusic

With Joe Beck

- Relaxin (DMP, 1983)
- Friends (DMP, 1984)
- Back to Beck (DMP, 1988)

With Louie Bellson

- Louie Bellson and His Jazz Orchestra (Musicmasters, 1987)
- Hot (Musicmasters, 1988)
- East Side Suite (Musicmasters, 1989)
- Airmail Special (Musicmasters, 1990)
- Peaceful Thunder (Jazz Heritage, 1993)

With Ann Hampton Callaway

- After Ours (Denon, 1997)
- Slow (Shanachie, 2004)
- At Last (Telarc, 2009)

With Barbara Carroll

- From the Beginning (United Artists, 1977)
- Live at the Carlyle (DRG, 1991)
- This Heart of Mine (DRG, 1994)
- Everything I Love (DRG, 1995)
- Live at Birdland (Harbinger, 2004)
- Sentimental Mood (Venus, 2006)
- I Wished on the Moon (Venus, 2007)
- Something to Live For (Harbinger, 2010)
- How Long Has This Been Going On? (Harbinger, 2011)

With Cynthia Crane & Mike Renzi

- Our First Christmas (Lookoutjazz, 1993)
- Smoky Bar Songs for the No Smoking Section (Lookoutjazz, 1994)
- & Mike Renzi, Blue Rendezvous (Lookoutjazz 1995)
- Cynthia's in Love (Lookoutjazz, 1997)

With Meredith D'Ambrosio

- Shadowland (Sunnyside, 1993)
- Echo of a Kiss (Sunnyside, 1998)
- Love Is for the Birds (Sunnyside, 2002)

With Barbara Cook

- You Make Me Feel So Young (DRG, 2011)
- Loverman (DRG, 2012)

With Blossom Dearie

- Positively Volume VII (Daffodil, 1983)
- with Mike Renzi, Tweedledum and Tweedledee (Daffodil, 1991)

With Mark Elf

- New York Cats (Jen Bay Records, 1999)
- Over the Airwaves (Jen Bay Records, 2000)

With Michael Feinstein

- Recorded Live at Feinstein's at the Regency (Concord Jazz, 2000)
- Romance on Film, Romance on Broadway (Concord Jazz, 2000)
- Fly Me to the Moon (DuckHole, 2010)

With Eddie Higgins

- Music of Jobim: Speaking of Love (Venus, 2000)
- Don't Smoke in Bed (Venus, 2000)
- Bewitched (Venus, 2001)
- A Time for Love (Nola, 2002)
- Moonlight Becomes You (Venus, 2003)
- Dear Old Stockholm (Venus, 2003)
- Dear Old Stockholm Vol. 2 (Venus, 2003)
- If Dreams Come True (Venus, 2004)
- My Funny Valentine (Venus, 2005)
- Christmas Songs (Venus, 2006)
- It's Magic Vol. 1 (Venus, 2007)
- It's Magic Vol. 2 (Venus, 2007)
- A Fine Romance (Venus, 2007)
- A Lovely Way to Spend an Evening (Venus, 2007)
- Secret Love (Venus, 2008)
- A Handful of Stars (Venus, 2009)
- Portraits of Love (Venus, 2009)
- You are Too Beautiful (Venus, 2009)
- Ballad Higgins (Venus, 2015)
- Standard Higgins (Venus, 2015)

With Dick Hyman

- Swing Is Here (Reference, 1996)
- You're My Everything (Venus, 2012

With Lynda Jamison

- Know What I've Learned (Suite Dreams by Linda, 1996)
- You and the Night and the Music (Lyn-Jam, 1998)
- UnPack Your Dreams (Lyn-Jam, 2001)

With Jane Jarvis

- Cut Glass (Audiophile, 1990)
- Jane and Jay At Duke's Place (Progressive, 1995)

With Morgana King

- Portraits (Muse, 1984)
- Tender Moments (Savoy, 2000)

With Nancy LaMott

- Come Rain or Come Shine (Triloka, 1992)
- My Foolish Heart (Midder, 1993)
- Just in Time for Christmas (King Kozmo, 1994)
- Listen to My Heart (King Kozmo, 1995)
- What's Good about Goodbye? (Midder, 1996)
- Ask Me Again (King Kozmo, 2008)

With Peggy Lee

- Miss Peggy Lee Sings the Blues (Musicmasters, 1988)
- The Peggy Lee Songbook: There'll Be Another Spring (Musical Heritage Society, 1989)
- Love Held Lightly: Rare Songs by Harold Arlen (Angel, 1993)
- Moments Like This (Chesky, 1993)

With Maureen McGovern

- Naughty Baby (CBS, 1989)
- Baby I'm Yours (BMG, 1992)
- Out of This World (MM Productions, 1996)
- The Music Never Ends (MM, 1997)
- A Long and Winding Road (PS Classics, 2008)
- You Raise Me Up: A Spiritual Journey (Lucid Artist Management, 2016)

With Max Morath

- Jonah Man and Other Songs of the Bert Williams Era (Vanguard, 1976)
- Jonah Man: A Tribute to Bert Williams (Vanguard, 1996)

With Gerry Mulligan

- Walk on the Water (DRG 1980)
- Little Big Horn (GRP 1983)
- Soft Lights & Sweet Music (Concord Jazz, 1986)

With Harold Ousley

- The Kid! (Cobblestone, 1972)
- The People's Groove (Muse, 1977)
- Sweet Double Hipness (Muse, 1980)

With Bucky Pizzarelli

- & John Bunch, NY Swing (LRC, 1992)
- & John Bunch, Cole Porter Collective - New York Swing (LRC, 1992)
- New York Swing Plays Rodgers and Hart (LRC, 1994)
- Manhattan Swing: A Visit with the Duke (Arbors, 2001)
- Doctor Swing (Victoria, 2003)
- Five for Freddie (Arbors, 2006)
- Plays the Music of Jerome Kern (LRC, 2006)

With Earl Rose

- Take My Breath Away (Sony, 1997)
- Guys and Dolls (Amadeus, 2005)
- Color, Rhythm and Magic: favorite Songs From Disney Classics (Varese Sarabande, 1999)

With Don Sebesky

- Full Cycle (Paddle Wheel, 1983)
- Moving Lines (Doctor Jazz, 1985)

With Daryl Sherman

- I've Got My Fingers Crossed (Audiophile, 1990)
- Born to Swing (Audiophile, 2002)
- Johnny Mercer A Centennial Tribute (Arbors, 2009)

With Mel Torme

- Mel Torme and Friends (Finesse, 1981)
- Encore at Marty's New York (Flair, 1982)

With Marlene VerPlanck

- A Warmer Place (Audiophile, 1982)
- I Like to Sing! (Audiophile, 1984)
- A New York Singer (Audiophile, 1995)
- Ballads...Mostly (Audiophile, 2013)
- I Give Up, I'm in Love (Audiophile, 2014)

With others

- Ben Aronov, Introducing Ben Aronov (Progressive, 1999)
- Benny Bailey, The Satchmo Legacy (Enja, 2000)
- Kenny Barron, Super Standard (Venus, 2004)
- Laurie Beechman, Time Between the Time (1990)
- Ronnie Bedford, Tour de West (Ronnie Bedford, 1998)
- Mary Ann Bernard, Point of Departure (Triple Z, 1993)
- Terence Blanchard, Clockers (Columbia, 1995)
- Bluesiana Triangle, Bluesiana II (Windham Hill, 1991)
- Michael Bolton, All That Matters (Columbia, 1997)
- Teresa Brewer, American Music Box Vol. 2 (Red Baron, 1993)
- Liz Callaway Anywhere I Wander (Varèse Sarabande, 1993)
- Canadian Brass, James Galway, Noel (RCA Victor, 1994)
- Ashley Brown, Speak Low (Ghostlight Reecords, 2010)
- David Buskin, Robin Batteau, Red Shoes and Golden Hearts (Nouveau Retro Media, 2009)
- Gerard Carelli, Lucky to Be Me (GC Records, 2000)
- Judy Carmichael, I Love Being Here With You (C&D Productions, 2014)
- Kvitka Cisyk, Kvitka (KMC, 1980)
- Steve Clayton, Love Is Said in Many Ways (Stash, 1991)
- Queen Latifah, The Dana Owens Album (A&M, 2004)
- Joan Crowe, Bird on the Wire (Evensong Music, 2005)
- Joan Crowe, In the Key of Comedy (Evensong Music, 2009)
- Lorna Dallas, Novello & Kern: The Girl I Knew (Harbinger, 1998)
- Roger Daltrey, Rocks in the Head (Atlantic, 1992)
- Jamie deRoy, Jamie DeRoy & Friends, Vol. 2: The Child in Me (Harbinger, 2001)
- Jamie deRoy, Jamie DeRoy & Friends, Vol. 4: Friends (Harbinger, 2003)
- Donald Fagen, Sunken Condos (Reprise, 2012)
- Carlos Franzetti, The Jazz Kamerata (Chesky, 2005)
- Kat Gang, Dream Your Troubles Away (Arbors, 2014)
- Kat Gamg, Love & the Lack Thereof (NKR Records, 2016)
- Robert Gordon, Bad Boy (BMG, 1997)
- Wycliffe Gordon, This Rhythm on My Mind (Bluesback, 2006)
- Urbie Green, Green Power (Project 3, 1971)
- Group 15, Plays Monk (Sunny side, 1998)
- Corky Hale, Harp Beat (Stash, 1985)
- Scott Hamilton, The Concord Jazz Heritage Series (Concord Jazz, 1998)
- Jane Harvey, The Other Side of Sondheim (Atlantic, 1988)
- Skitch Henderson, Bucky Pizzarelli, Legends (Arbors, 2003)
- Nicole Henry, Teach Me Tonight (Venus, 2005)
- Per Husby, If You Could See Me Now (Gemini, 1996)
- Garland Jeffreys, Don't Call Me Buckwheat (RCA, 1991)
- Etta Jones, At Last (Muse, 1995)
- Hank Jones, Arigato (Progressive, 1989)
- Beat Kaestli, Invitation (Chesky, 2010)
- Roger Kellaway, New Jazz Standards Vol 3 (Summit, 2018)
- Roger Kellaway. Live at the Jazz Standard (IPO, 2008)
- Peggy King, Peggy King Sings Jerome Kern (Stash, 1985)
- Lee Konitz, Dovetail (Sunnyside, 1985)
- Jane Krakowski, The Laziest Gal in Town (DRG, 2010)
- Karin Krog, Georgie Fame, On a Misty Night (Odin, 2018)
- Charles Kuralt, Loonis McGlohon, North Carolina Is My Home (Piedmont Airlines, 1985)
- Cleo Laine, Jazz (RCA Victor, 1991)
- Barbara Lea, Bob Dorough, Dick Sudhalter, Hoagy's Children (Audiophile, 1983)
- Carole Laure, Alibis (RCA Victor/Saravah, 1979)
- Carole Laure, Lewis Furey, Bande Originale Du Film Fantastica (Saravah, 1980)
- Carolyn Leonhart, Steal the Moon (Sunnyside, 2000)
- Carolyn Leonhart, Chances Are (President, 2008)
- Donna Leonhart, Bein' Green (Sunnyside, 2001)
- Michael Leonhart, The Painted Lady Suite (Sunnyside, 2018)
- Michael Leonhart, Glub Glub vol. 11 (Sunnyside, 1997)
- Marian McPartland, Steely Dan, Marian McPartland's Piano Jazz with Steely Dan (Jazz Alliance, 2005)
- Marieann Meringolo, Hold Me Close (Golden Chords, 1997)
- Bette Midler, Some People's Lives (Atlantic, 1990)
- Glenn Miller, In the Digital Mood (GRP, 1983)
- Liza Minnelli, Live in New York 1979 (Real Gone Music, 2021)
- Chieli Minucci, Jewels (JVC, 1995)
- Michael Moriarty, Sweet 'n' Gritty (Disques Swing, 1991)
- Mosquitos, Mexican Dust (Six Degrees Records, 2017)
- Heather Mullen, Heather Mullen (Rhino, 1991)
- Gerry Mulligan, Walk on the Water (DRG, 1980)
- Mark Murphy, Lucky to Be Me (HighNote, 2002)
- Jeanne Napoli, Jeanne (Vigor, 1976)
- Gerry Niewood, Share My Dream (DMP, 1985)
- Christian Nova, Walking Happy (Original Cast Records, 1996)
- Jeanne O'Connor, Something's Coming (Jeanne O'Connor, 2007)
- Anita O'Day, S Wonderful Big Band Concert 1985 (Emily, 1985)
- Lou Pallo, Thank You Les (American Showplace Records, 2012)
- Graham Parker, Steady Nerves (Elektra, 1985)
- Ken Peplowski, Noir Blue (Capri Records, 2010)
- Houston Person, Christmas with Houston Person and Friends (Muse, 1994)
- Anne Phillips, Gonna Lay My Heart on the Line (Conawago, 2000)
- Peter, Paul & Mary, No Easy Walk to Freedom (Mercury, 1986)
- David Pomeranz, Time to Fly (Decca, 1971)
- Jim Pugh, Eijiro Nakagawa, Just Us (E'nJ, 2006)
- Leon Redbone, Any Time (Blue Thumb, 2001)
- Trudy Richards, Manhattan Serenade (Beekman Place, 1990)
- Annie Ross, Music Is Forever (DRG, 1996)
- Randy Sandke, Jazz for Juniors (Arbors, 2009)
- Cynthia Sayer, String Swing (Jazzology, 2000)
- Michel Sardaby, Night Blossom (DIW, 1990)
- Sammy Sherman, A Jazz Original Live at Chan's (Arbors, 2004)
- Carly Simon, My Romance (Arista, 1990)
- Paul Simon, Songs from The Capeman (Warner Bros., 1997)
- Carol Sloane, Live at Birdland (Club 44 Records, 2022)
- Tessa Souter, Nights of Key Largo (Venus, 2008)
- KT Sullivan, Sing My Heart (DRG, 1995)
- Sylvia Syms, Lovingly (Rhino, 2001)
- Grady Tate, From the Heart (Half Note, 2006)
- James Taylor, Never Die Young (Columbia, 1988)
- Lizzie Thomas, New Sounds From the Jazz Age (Lizzie Thomas, 2020)
- Dave Tofani, An American Garden (SoloWinds, 2001)
- Was (Not Was), Born to Laugh at Tornadoes (Geffen, 1983)
- Chuck Wayne, Traveling (Progressive, 1980)
- Fred Wesley, It Don't Mean a Thing If It Ain't Got That Swing (Sons of Sound, 2006)
- Joe Wilder, Alone with Just My Dreams (Evening Star, 1991)
- Iris Williams, I'm Glad There Is You (Sea Ker Inc., 1995)

== See also ==
- Secrets Every Smart Traveler Should Know, musical comedy revue
