= Kenny Davern =

American jazz clarinetist (1935–2006)

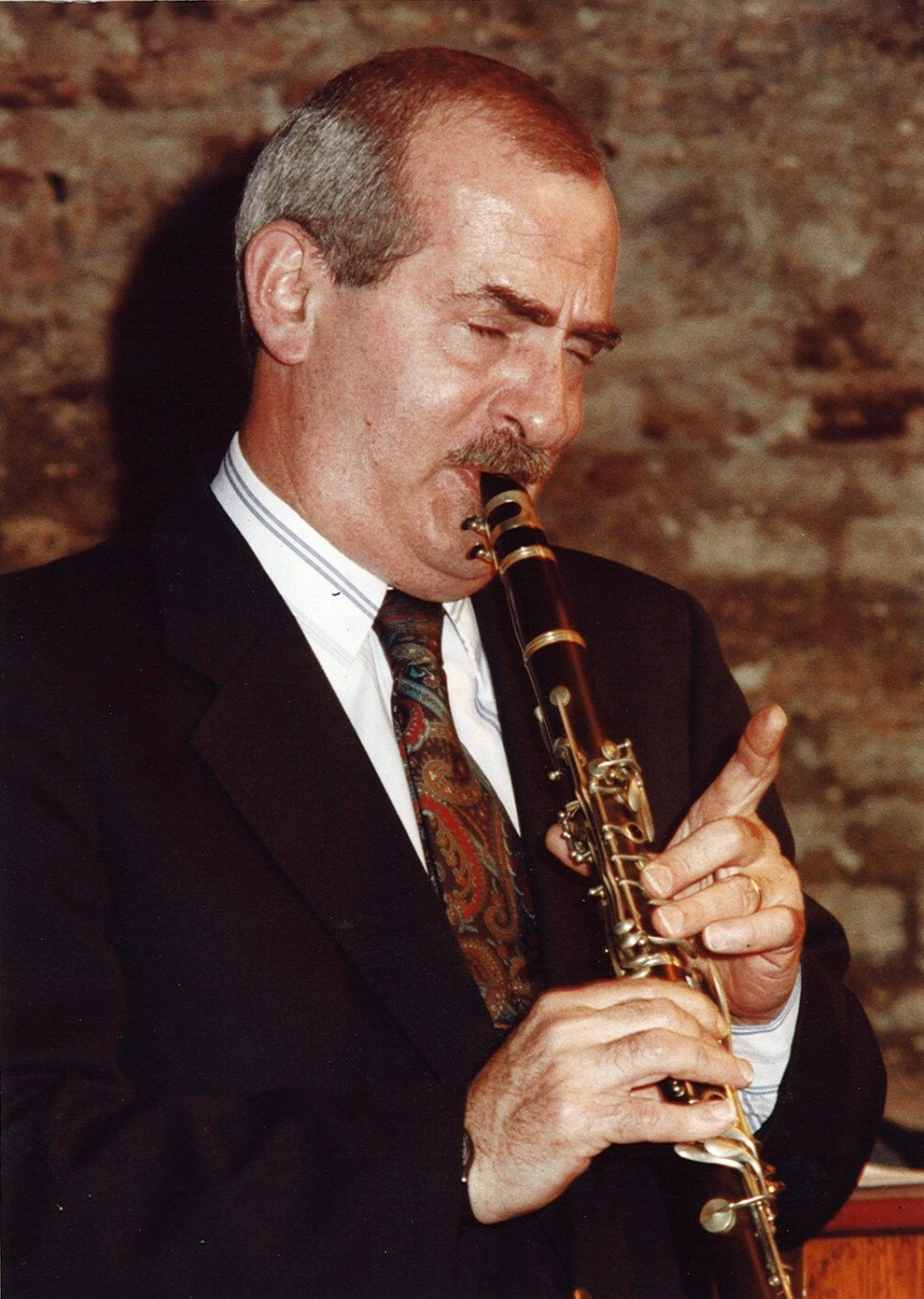
- Kenny Davern on clarinet

Background information
- Born: John Kenneth Davern; January 7, 1935; Huntington, New York, U.S.
- Died: December 12, 2006 (aged 71) Sandia Park, New Mexico, U.S.
- Genres: Dixieland, swing
- Occupation: Musician
- Instrument: Clarinet
- Labels: Arbors, Chiaroscuro, Jazzology

John Kenneth Davern (January 7, 1935 – December 12, 2006) was an American jazz clarinetist.

== Biography ==
He was born in Huntington, Long Island, to a family of mixed Jewish and Irish-Catholic ancestry. His mother's family originally came from Vienna, Austria, where his great-grandfather Alfred Roth had been a colonel in the Austro-Hungarian cavalry, the highest rank accessible to a Jew in the Habsburg Imperial army.

After hearing Pee Wee Russell the first time, he was convinced that he wanted to be a jazz musician, too; and at the age of 16 he joined the musician's union, first as a baritone saxophone player. In 1954 he joined Jack Teagarden's Band, and after only a few days with the band he made his first jazz recordings. Later on, he worked with bands led by Phil Napoleon and Pee Wee Erwin before joining the Dukes of Dixieland in 1962. The late 1960s found him freelancing with, among others, Red Allen, Ralph Sutton, Yank Lawson and his lifelong friend Dick Wellstood.

At this time, he had also taken up the soprano saxophone, and when a spontaneous coupling with fellow reedman Bob Wilber at Dick Gibson's Colorado Jazz Party turned out be a huge success, one of the most important jazz groups of the 1970s, Soprano Summit, was created. Co-led by Wilber and Davern, both switching between the clarinet and various saxophones, during the next five years Soprano Summit enjoyed a successful string of record dates and concerts. When the group disbanded in 1979, Davern devoted himself to solely playing clarinet, preferring trio formats with piano and drums. One such trio was as a member of the Hot Three with vibraphonist Don DeMicheal and pianist Art Hodes.

Davern's collaboration with Bob Wilber was revived in 1991, the new group being called Summit Reunion. Leading his own quartets since the 1990s, Davern preferred the guitar to the piano in his rhythm section, employing guitarists Bucky Pizzarelli, Howard Alden and James Chirillo. He also made several appearances to the Colorado Springs Invitational Jazz Party and performed with numerous international jazz musicians.

In 1997, he was inducted into the Jazz Hall of Fame at Rutgers University, and in 2001 he received an honorary doctorate of music at Hamilton College, Clinton, New York. In addition to the jazz greats that inspired him, Kenny Davern indicated classical clarinetist David Weber, principal solo clarinetist with the New York City Ballet Orchestra, as his most important teacher.

Although playing mainly in traditional jazz and swing settings, his musical interests encompass a much broader range of styles. In 1978 he collaborated with avantgarde players Steve Lacy, Steve Swallow and Paul Motian on a free jazz-inspired album appropriately entitled Unexpected. In addition to his accomplishments in jazz, his ardour and knowledge of classical music was encyclopaedic, particularly of the work of conductor Wilhelm Furtwängler.

Especially after concentrating exclusively on playing the clarinet, Kenny Davern called his own an unmatched mastery of the instrument. A full, rounded tone, especially "woody" in the lower chalumeau register, combined with highly personal tone inflections and the ability to hit notes far above the conventional range of the clarinet, made his sound immediately recognizable. In the late 1980s, The New York Times hailed him as "the finest jazz clarinetist playing today".

Davern died of a heart attack at his Sandia Park, New Mexico home.

== Discography ==
=== As featured artist ===
| Title | Released | Note | Label |
|---|---|---|---|
| Dialogues | 2006-05-08 | w/ Ken Peplowski | Arbors |
| No One Else But Kenny | 2006-11-21 | Kenny Davern Trio | Sackville |
| In Concert at the Outpost Performance Space, Albuquerque 2004 | 2005-09-13 | Kenny Davern Quartet | Arbors |
| At the Mill Hill Playhouse | 2003-11-04 | Kenny Davern Quartet | Arbors |
| The Kings of Jazz | 2003-08-05 | - | Arbors |
| Live at the Floating Jazz Festival | 2002-01-22 | w/ Joe Temperley | Chiaroscuro |
| The Jazz KENnection | 2001-10-30 | w/ Ken Peplowski | Arbors |
| A Night with Eddie Condon | 2001-05-01 | w/ Eddie Condon | Arbors |
| You Ain't Heard Nothin' Yet | 2001-01-01 | - | Jazzology |
| Ralph Sutton and Kenny Davern | 1998-01-01 | | Chiaroscuro |
| Smiles | 1998-01-01 | | Arbors |
| Breezin' Along | 1996-06-13 | - | Arbors |
| Spanish Eyes | 1995-11-05 | | Chiaroscuro |
| Never in a Million Years | 1995-10-01 | - | Challenge |
| Kenny Davern and the Rhythm Men | 1995-06-15 | | Arbors |
| East Side, West Side | 1994-06-24 | - | Arbors |
| Soprano Summit | 1994-01-01 | w/ Bob Wilber | Chiaroscuro |
| My Inspiration | 1991-09-11 | | MusicMasters |
| The Last Reunion | 1998-05-14 | - | Upbeat |
| Ralph Sutton and Kenny Davern | 1998-01-01 | w/ Ralph Sutton | Chiaroscuro |
| Summit Reunion | 1989-01-01 | w/ Bob Wilber | Charoscuro |
| One Hour Tonight | January 1988 | Kenny Davern Quartet | Musical Heritage Society |
| I'll See You in My Dreams | 1988-01-01 | | MusicMasters |
| This Old Gang of Ours | 1985-12-10 | - | Upbeat |
| Kenny Davern Big Three | 1985-11-25 | | Jazzology |
| Kenny Davern and Dick Wellstood | 1984-01-15 | w/ Dick Wellstood | Challenge |
| Live Hot Jazz | 1983-12-18 | - | Statiras |
| Stretchin' Out | 1983-12-01 | - | Jazzology |
| The Very Thought of You | 1983-01-01 | - | Milton Keynes |
| El Rado Schuffle | 1980-06-07 | - | Kenneth |
| The Free-Swinging Trio in the Jazz Tradition | 1979-12-02 | - | Fat Cat Jazz |
| The Hot Three | 1979-07-01 | - | Monmouth |
| Unexpected | 1978-05-30 | w/ Steve Lacy, Steve Swallow, and Paul Motion | Kharma |
| John and Joe | 1977-10-23 | w/ Flip Phillips | Chiaroscuro |
| Live at The New School | 1972-04-01 | w/ Eddie Condon, and Gene Krupa | Chiaroscuro |

=== As sideman ===
With Dick Wellstood

- Dick Wellstood and His All Star Orchestra (Chiaroscuro, 1981)

With George Shearing

- George Shearing in Dixieland (Concord, 1989)

With Roswell Rudd

- Blown Bone (Philips, 1979)
