= Tony DeNicola =

American jazz musician

- Birth name: Antonio Emedio
- Born: September 2, 1927; Pennington, New Jersey, U.S.
- Died: September 2, 2006 (aged 79); Philadelphia, Pennsylvania, U.S.
- Genres: Jazz
- Instruments: Drums

Antonio Emedio, known as Tony DeNicola (September 2, 1927 – September 2, 2006) was an American jazz drummer most associated with Kenny Davern, although he also had his own quartet.

== Early life and education ==
Born in Pennington, New Jersey, DeNicola was a longtime resident of the Lawrenceville section of Lawrence Township, Mercer County, New Jersey. He earned a Bachelor of Science and Master of Science from Trenton State College (now the College of New Jersey).

== Career ==
DeNicola began his career playing drums in firehouse bands, polka bands, and nightclubs. He served in the United States Army Air Forces in 1946 and 1947. In 1948, he toured the Midwest with Donn Trenner and later performed at venues in San Francisco. After returning to New Jersey to help his grandparents run their tavern, he continued touring and performing with jazz musicians, including Freddy Martin, Harry James, Billy Butterfield, and Charlie Shavers. DeNicola also taught music in the Trenton Public Schools. After earning his master's degree, DeNicola worked as an adjunct professor at Trenton State College from 1972 until his retirement in 1992. After retiring from teaching, he continued to perform.

== Personal life ==
DeNicola died at the Fox Chase Cancer Center in Philadelphia in 2006.
