= Hank O'Neal =

American music producer, author and photographer

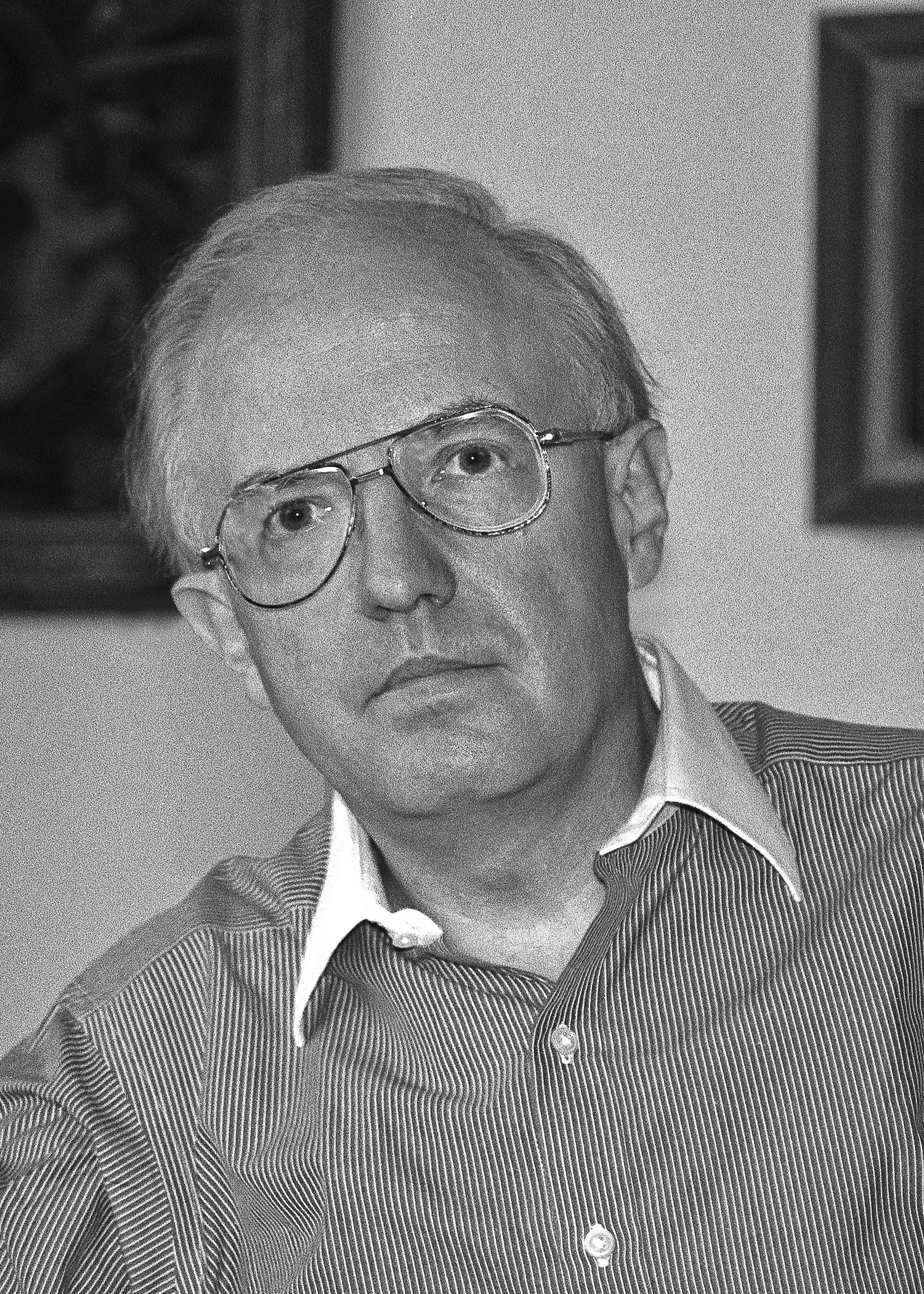
- O'Neal in August 1995
- Born: Harold L. O'Neal, Jr. June 5, 1940 (age 86); Kilgore, Texas, United States
- Education: Syracuse University
- Occupations: Music producer Author; Photographer
- Years active: 1970-present
- Known for: Founder of Chiaroscuro Records and Hammond Music Enterprises
- Military career
- Allegiance: United States
- Branch: United States Army
- Service years: 1962–1967
- Rank: Captain

Hank O'Neal (born Harold L. O'Neal Jr.; June 5, 1940) is an American music producer, author, and photographer.

== Background ==
Hank O'Neal's mother, Sarah Christian O'Neal, was a homemaker from Tyler, Texas; she was musical and intellectual. Hank's father was a soldier in the U.S. Army in Texas and the Pacific (1929–1947) and after World War II, an educator and public school superintendent in upstate New York (1953–72). Hank O'Neal grew up in Texas, Bloomington, Indiana; and Syracuse, New York. He graduated from Syracuse University in 1962.

== Early career ==
O'Neal worked for the CIA from 1963 until 1976. He served in the U.S. Army during the same period (1962–1967), rising to the rank of captain.

== Music ==
During a 40-year career in music he formed two record companies, Chiaroscuro Records and Hammond Music Enterprises, built two recording studios (WARP and Downtown Sound), produced over 200 jazz LPs/CDs and in conjunction with his business partner, Shelley M. Shier and their production company, HOSS, Inc. produced over 100 music festivals (The Floating Jazz Festival, The Blues Cruise, Mardi Gras At Sea, Big Bands At Sea, and others from 1983 to 2002). He published books and articles on jazz, photographed most of the major jazz musicians from the second half of the 20th century, exhibited these photographs regularly and served on the boards of various non-profit organizations which serve the jazz community, including the Jazz and Contemporary Music Program of The New School (1985 to present), The Jazz Foundation of America (1993 to present), the Jazz Gallery (1995 to present), and the National Jazz Museum in Harlem. He is a lifetime member of The National Academy of Recording Arts and Sciences.

== Photography ==
O'Neal began taking photographs while a teenager, and he had his first exhibition in September 1973 at The Open Mind Gallery in New York City. In the 1970s, he associated with a diverse group of photographers notably Walker Evans, André Kertész, and most importantly, Berenice Abbott, with whom he worked for the last 19 years of her life.

From 1970 to 1999 (in addition to undertaking many photographic projects), O'Neal published many books related to photography. In 1999, he had a major retrospective of his work to that point at The Witkin Gallery. Since this time, he focused his activities toward photography, and continues to mount exhibitions yearly throughout the U.S. and Canada. In 1976, he published a photo book "A Vision Shared". It documents efforts undertaken under the FDR Administration to create a visual, historical record of the situation in the United States during the Great Depression.

In January 1985, Allen Ginsberg asked O'Neal to take portraits of Andy Warhol at his studio for a film about Ginsberg's life. After Hank took the expressionless portraits of Warhol he decided to paint over the negatives after the shoot and in 2005 created digital versions of the images.

== Humanitarian causes ==
O'Neal sits on the honorary founders board of The Jazz Foundation of America. O'Neal has served on the boards of non-profit organizations, including the Jazz Museum in Harlem, New York; the Jazz Gallery, and the Jazz and Contemporary Program of The New School.

== Selected publications ==
=== Books (text and illustrations) ===
- The Eddie Condon Scrapbook of Jazz (St. Martin's Press, 1973)
- A Vision Shared (St. Martin's Press, 1976)
- Berenice Abbott - American Photographer (McGraw-Hill, 1982)
- Life Is Painful, Nasty and Short ... In My Case It Has Only Been Painful and Nasty - Djuna Barnes L 1978-81 (Paragon, 1990)
- Charlie Parker (Filipacchi, 1995)
- The Ghosts of Harlem (Filipacchi, 1997) French language edition
- The Ghosts of Harlem (Vanderbilt University Press, 2009) English language edition
- Hank O'Neal Portraits 1971-2000 (Sordoni Art Gallery, 2000)
- Billie & Lester in Oslo (A Play with Music, 2005)
- Gay Day – The Golden Age of the Christopher Street Parade (Abrams, 2006)
- Berenice Abbott (Steidl, 2008)
- The Unknown Berenice Abbott - Steidl (October 15, 2013)
- A Vision Shared - 4oth Anniversary Edition - Steidl (December 1, 2016)
- Berenice Abbott - The Paris Portraits - Steidl (November 22, 2016)

=== Books (photographs only) ===
- Allegra Kent's Water Beauty Book (St Martin's Press, 1976)
- All the King's Men (Limited Editions Club, 1990)
- XCIA's Street Art Project: The First Four Decades (Siman Media Works, 2012)

=== Portfolios ===
- Berenice Abbott - Portraits In Palladium (Text Only, Commerce Graphics/ Lunn Limited, 1990)
- Hank O'Neal - Photographs (Text and 12 gravure prints), Limited Editions Club, 1990)
- The Ghosts of Harlem (Text and 12 photographs), Glenside Press, 2007)
