= Creole Cookin' =

Studio album by Bobby Hackett
- Released: 1967
- Recorded: January 30, February 2, March 13 and May 2, 1967
- Studios: A & R Studios, Capitol Studios, NYC
- Genre: Jazz
- Labels: Verve; V/V6 8698
- Producer: Bob Morgan

Bobby Hackett chronology
Bobby Hackett Plays Tony Bennett's Greatest Hits (1966)	Creole Cookin' (1967)	Bobby / Billy / Brazil (1968)

Creole Cookin', is an album by cornetist Bobby Hackett which was released on the Verve label in 1967.

== Critical reception ==
Professional ratings
Review scores
Source	Rating
AllMusic	4.5/5 stars

Scott Yanow of AllMusic called it "one of his finest all-around recordings" and states: "The cornetist is featured on 11 Dixieland standards and joined by a 15-piece all-star band arranged by Bob Wilber; Wilber and tenor great Zoot Sims also receive some solo space on this essential release".

== Track listing ==
1. "High Society" (Porter Steele) – 2:07
2. "Tin Roof Blues" (George Brunies, Paul Mares, Ben Pollack, Leon Roppolo, Mel Stitzel) – 4:43
3. "When the Saints Go Marching In" (Traditional) – 2:52
4. "Basin Street Blues" (Spencer Williams) – 3:51
5. "Fidgety Feet" (Nick LaRocca, Larry Shields) – 2:19
6. "Royal Garden Blues" (Clarence Williams, Spencer Williams) – 2:49
7. "Muskrat Ramble" (Kid Ory, Ray Gilbert) – 2:32
8. "Original Dixieland One Step" (LaRocca) – 2:12
9. "New Orleans" (Hoagy Carmichael) – 3:01
10. "Lazy Mood" (Eddie Miller, Johnny Mercer) – 2:03
11. "Do You Know What It Means to Miss New Orleans" (Eddie DeLange, Louis Alter) – 3:03

== Personnel ==
- Bobby Hackett – cornet
- Rusty Dedrick, Jimmy Maxwell – trumpet
- Bob Brookmeyer – trombone, valve trombone
- Cutty Cutshall (tracks 1–5, 7–9 & 11), Lou McGarity (tracks 6 & 10) – trombone
- Bob Wilber – clarinet, alto saxophone, arranger
- Jerry Dodgion – alto saxophone
- Joe Farrell (tracks 4, 5, 9 & 11), Zoot Sims – tenor saxophone
- Pepper Adams – baritone saxophone
- Dave McKenna – piano
- Wayne Wright – guitar
- Buddy Jones – bass
- Morey Feld – drums
