= Johnny Windhurst =

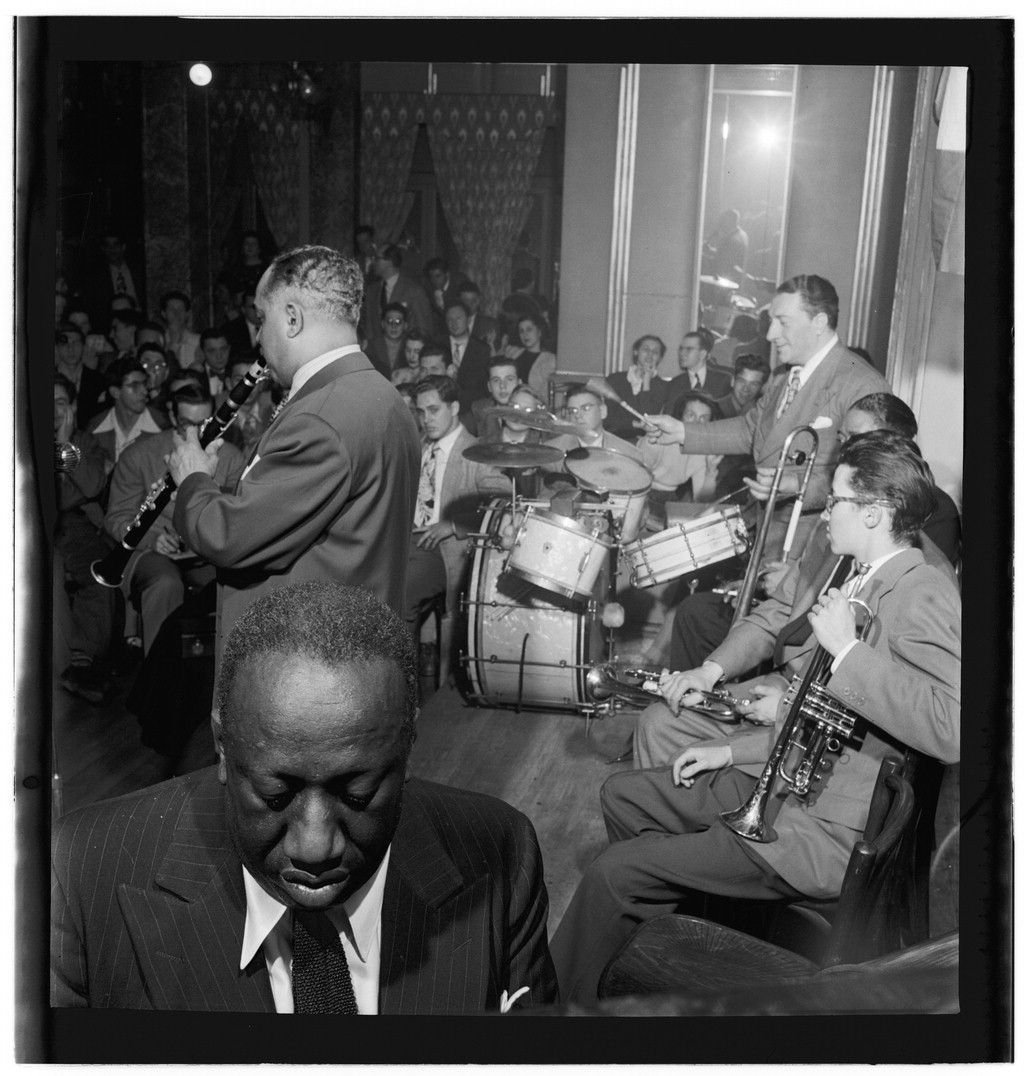
- James P. Johnson, Albert Nicholas, Johnny Windhurst, Marty Marsala, Sandy Williams, and Danny Alvin, Webster Hall, New York City, June 1947 (William P. Gottlieb 04621)

Background information
- Birth name: John Henry Windhurst
- Born: November 5, 1926
- Died: October 2, 1981 (aged 54)
- Genres: Jazz
- Occupation: Musician
- Instrument: Trumpet

John Henry Windhurst (November 5, 1926 – October 2, 1981) was an American jazz trumpet player, who played primarily in the swing, big-band, and dixieland styles. Windhurst was a self-taught musician and known for his solos; he considered Bix Beiderbecke, Bobby Hackett, Wild Bill Davison, and Bunny Berigan among his influences. His playing style was considered to be a mixture of the delicate playing style of Bobby Hackett with his own feathery vibrato and mobility. Ruby Braff has cited Windhurst as one of his biggest inspirations as a jazz artist.

== History ==
At the age of 15 he played his first public performance at Nick's in New York City. Windhurst made his professional debut during the spring of 1944 at one of Eddie Condon's concerts at the Town Hall in New York City. At 18 years old, he was chosen by Sidney Bechet to play at the Savoy Cafe in Boston, replacing Bunk Johnson. Windhurst was initially recruited to the band to play the cornet. This engagement launched his career as a trumpeter and he went on to play with Art Hodes and James P. Johnson at the Jazz at Town Hall concert in September 1946. He then moved to the midwest and after a brief stint in the Chicago Jazz scene he returned to the Savoy Cafe as a member of Edmond Hall's band and eventually moved west to experience the west coast jazz scene in California. His inability to read music forced him to decline gigs with Benny Goodman and Woody Herman while emphasizing his preference of informal jamming. Over the years, he played for musicians such as Louis Armstrong, Nappy Lamare, and Eddie Condon. He also led his own band, Riverboat Five, through Columbus, Ohio and Boston for several years, but for such endeavors he chose to refrain from playing the most popular east coast venues and nightclubs and instead played college campuses and other small venues. In the early 1950s Windhurst worked with Ruby Braff in one of the groups known as Jazz at Storyville in 1951. During the following two years he performed at Condon's club (1952-1953) and eventually went on to perform alongside George Wettling and Jack Teagarden in 1954 as well as Barbara Lea from 1995 through 1957. Windhurst accompanied vocalists like Lea while in 1956 he took a stage role with actor Conrad Janis in an off-broadway musical titled, Joy Ride. Windhurst only made one recording with his swing quartet, the John Windhurst Quartet in which Buell Neidlinger was a sideman, a record called Jazz at Columbus Avenue, recorded for the Transition label in 1956. In 1961, he performed with his band the Sheridan Squares, which included Cutty Cutshall and Cliff Leeman, during his return to Nick's, New York. He eventually moved upstate to Poughkeepsie with his mother, where he finished his career in a dixieland band at Frivolous Sal's Last Chance Saloon. Trombonist Eddie Hubble commented on Windhurst's lack of motivation:

"He won't do anything, won't travel, just wants to stay where he is. He should get out and let people know he's still alive".

Throughout the 1960s and 1970s Windhurst opted to perform primarily in obscure venues in less well-known places of the U.S. Despite his range of talent and success, Windhurst was seemingly content to shy away from the big-time. Several years later, after receiving an invitation to play the Manassas Jazz Festival in 1981, Windhurst died of a heart attack.

He is interred at Woodlawn Cemetery in the Bronx, New York City.

== Quartet ==
Only the third release from George Buck's up and coming label, Jazzology, the Johnny Windhurst Quartet's LP The Imaginative Johnny Windhurst was a fairly "obscure but valuable" project. The LP features Windhurst's unique trumpet style, Buell Neidlinger on the bass, and Jim Andrews on the piano. The piece titled "When You're Smiling" additionally features Bud Blacklock on the piano and Hamilton Carson sitting in on the tenor saxophone. The LP was recorded at a showcase in Massachusetts, where the decision to record it was made on the spot just as the show began. The spontaneous set flaunt's Windhurst's innovative playing on timeless numbers such as "Back In Your Own Back Yard," "Strut Miss Lizzie" and "Lover Come Back to Me."

== Discography ==
As leader

- Jazz at Columbus Avenue with Buell Neidlinger, Walt Gifford, and Jimmy Andrews (Transition, 1956)
- The Imaginative Johnny Windhurst (Jazzology, 1956)

As sideman

- Woman in Love with Barbara Lea (Prestige, 1955)
- Barbara Lea (1956)
- Walt Gifford's New Yorkers with Walt Gifford (Delmark, 1960)
- Jazz Band Ball: Volume 2 with Eddie Condon (Paradox)
- Dr. Jazz Series, Vol. 1 with Eddie Condon (1993)
- Dr. Jazz Series, Vol. 16 with Eddie Condon (2001)
- 1947–1950 with Eddie Condon (2001)
- Flyin' High 1949–1959 with Edmond Hall (2006)
