= Ed Polcer =

American jazz musician

- Born: Ed Colcer; February 10, 1937 (age 88); Paterson, New Jersey, U.S.
- Genres: Jazz
- Occupations: Cornetist; bandleader; festival director; club owner
- Instrument: Cornet
- Years active: 1950s–present

Ed Polcer (born February 10, 1937, in Paterson, New Jersey, United States) is an American jazz cornetist, bandleader, festival director, club owner, and mentor of young musicians. He has been described as a "melodic mellow-toned cornetist with an unforced delivery".

== Life and career ==
Polcer started leading jazz bands while attending Princeton University. While at Princeton studying engineering, he was headed toward a promising career as a professional baseball player. During that time, he was asked to play at the wedding of Princess Grace and Prince Rainier in Monaco, as well as a concert in Carnegie Hall. He chose music over baseball.

When cornetist Bobby Hackett recommended him to Benny Goodman, he abandoned his engineering and purchasing day jobs and joined Goodman's small band. Other musicians in that band included John Bunch, Bucky Pizzarelli, Slam Stewart, Al Klink, Zoot Sims, George Masso, and Peter Appleyard.

While in his 20s and 30s, Polcer played with Teddy Wilson, Bobby Hackett, Kenny Davern, Dick Wellstood, Gene Ramey, Sonny Greer, Joe Muranyi, Herbie Nichols and Joe Venuti.

With his wife, singer and actress Judy Kurtz, Polcer managed and co-owned (with Red Balaban) Eddie Condon's Jazz Club in New York City from 1977 until 1985. Sharing the bandstand with him at the club were such musicians as Vic Dickenson, Herb Hall, and Connie Kay. He was instrumental in giving several younger musicians, such as Scott Hamilton, Warren Vache, Dan Barrett, and Mark Shane a showcase of their talents at Condon's. After the wrecking ball demolished the club, he toured the country with his shows A Night at Eddie Condon's, The Magic of Swing Street, and When Broadway Meets Swing Street. He served as musical director of several jazz festivals, including the North Carolina Jazz Festival, Colorado Springs Jazz Party, and San Diego Jazz Party.

In the 1980s, he served as president of the Long Island, New York-based non-profit International Art of Jazz, which promoted community and corporate involvement in jazz, presented jazz programs, produced the Islip Jazz Festival and implemented a state-wide jazz arts-in-education program. He played for five U.S. Presidents, including the Congressional Ball at the White House for President Clinton in 1994, and played in Thailand with the King of Thailand, a jazz clarinetist and enthusiast.

== Personal life ==
Polcer's father and uncle were part-time musicians. His first instrument was the xylophone, which he played in local church shows and talent contests starting at the age of five, with his younger sister Betty. He was encouraged to learn a second instrument, the trumpet, at the age of nine. His first marriage to Barbara Fimbel ended in divorce. He and Barbara had one daughter, Karen, and they adopted a Vietnamese war orphan, James. In 1976, he married Judy Kurtz, and they have two sons, Sam, born 1977, and Ben, born 1978.

== Awards and honors ==
- 2002 New Jersey Jazz Society lifetime achievement award
- 2009 San Diego Jazz Party, Jazz Legend
- 2012 Atlanta Jazz Preservation Society, "For unyielding commitment to the preservation of our beloved American art form of jazz"

== Discography ==
=== As leader ===
- 1982 In the Condon Tradition (Jazzology)
- 1993 The Magic of Swing Street (Blewz Manor)
- 1993 A Salute to Eddie Condon (Nagel Heyer)
- 1994 Coast to Coast Swingin' Jazz (Jazzology)
- 1994 Some Sunny Day (Jazzology)
- 1995 Jammin' a la Condon (Jazzology)
- 2000 The Magic of Swing
- 2003 Let's Do It (Blewz Manor)
- 2005 At the Ball (Jazzology)
- 2008 Lionel, Red & Bunny (Blewz Manor)

=== As sideman ===
- 1975 Fats Waller Revisited, Dick Wellstood
- 1977 Double Time, Leon Redbone
- 1981 From Branch to Branch, Leon Redbone
- 1988 At the Grand Opera House, Vol. 1, Doctor Billy Dodd
- 1988 At the Grand Opera House, Vol. 2, Doctor Billy Dodd
- 1994 At the Atlanta Jazz Party, Barbara Lea
- 1995 Whose Honey Are You?, Terry Blaine
- 2002 Born to Swing, Daryl Sherman
- 2002 Jammin' for Condon, Lino Patruno
- 2004 A Multitude of Stars, Statesmen of Jazz
- 2004 Ballads, Burners and Blues, Allan Vache
- 2004 With Thee I Swing, Terry Blaine/Mark Shane
- 2007 Puttin' on the Ritz, Jonathan Russell
- 2007 When Broadway Meets Swing Street, Judy Kurtz

== Other sources ==
- Scott Yanow, Ed Polcer at AllMusic
- Lew Shaw, Jazz Beat – Notes on Classic Jazz, AZ told Publishing Co., Scottsdale AZ, 2013, pp. 5, 6, 129–132
- Barry Kernfeld editor, The New Grove Dictionary of Jazz, St. Martin's Press NY, 1995, p. 990
- K. Abe', "Jazz Giants", p. 273
- Leonard Feather and Ira Gitler, The Biographical Encyclopedia of Jazz, Oxford University Press, 1999, p. 533
- Ian Carr, Digby Fairweather, Brian Priestley, Jazz, The Essential Companion, Grafton Books, London, 1987, p. 395
- Ian Carr, Digby Fairweather, Brian Priestley, Jazz, The Rough Guide, Penguin Books, London, p. 511
- Chip Deffaa, Traditionalists and Revivalists in Jazz, Scarecrow Press, Newark, New Jersey, 1993
- Scott Yanow, The Trumpet Kings – The Players Who Shaped The Sound of Jazz Trumpet, 2001, p. 298
