= Butch Miles =

American jazz drummer (1944–2023)

Background information
- Born: Charles J. Thornton Jr. July 4, 1944; Ironton, Ohio, U.S.
- Died: February 2, 2023 (aged 78) Austin, Texas, U.S.
- Genres: Jazz
- Occupation: Musician
- Instrument: Drums
- Years active: 1962–2023
- Labels: Famous Door, Nagel Heyer
- Website: butchmiles.com

Charles J. Thornton, Jr. (July 4, 1944 – February 2, 2023), known professionally as Butch Miles, was an American jazz drummer. He played with the Count Basie Orchestra, Dave Brubeck, Ella Fitzgerald, Sammy Davis Jr., Frank Sinatra, Lena Horne, and Tony Bennett.

== Career ==
Miles, who cited Buddy Rich, Gene Krupa, and Jo Jones as favorite drummers, began playing snare drum at the age of nine and majored in music at West Virginia State University (1962–1966). After receiving his degree, he went on tour with the Iris Bell Trio. He was Mel Torme's drummer for 3 1/2 years and it was Torme and Buddy Rich who recommended Miles to Count Basie when a drummer was needed. Miles was with the Count Basie Orchestra from 1975 to 1979 and then returned for ten years from 1997 to 2007.

From Count Basie’s autobiography (published in 1985): “Butch came to us from Mel Torme’s outfit. He was a real crowd pleaser, like Buddy Rich and Sonny Payne, and he picked up on things very nicely, and he was also interested in sticking around for a while, which he did, for about four years.”

Miles was leader of the group Jazz Express in the 1980s and 1990s. He performed at the Newport Jazz Festival and the Montreux Jazz Festival. He was a member of the West Virginia Music Hall of Fame 2011 class of inductees. He retired from the School of Music at Texas State University-San Marcos.

== Death ==
In March 2014, Miles was diagnosed with idiopathic pulmonary fibrosis. which has no treatment other than a lung transplant. He received a lung transplant and went into a period of recovery.

Miles died in Austin, Texas, on February 2, 2023, at the age of 78.

== Discography ==
=== As leader ===
- Miles and Miles of Swing... (Famous Door, 1978)
- Lady Be Good with Bucky Pizzarelli (Dreamstreet, 1978)
- Butch's Encore (Famous Door, 1979)
- Butch Miles Salutes Chick Webb (Famous Door, 1980)
- Butch Miles Swings Some Standards (Famous Door, 1981)
- Butch Miles Salutes Gene Krupa (Famous Door, 1982)
- More Miles...More Standards with Jorge Anders (Famous Door, 1985)
- Introducing the Ivory Coast Suite (Dreamstreet, 1986)
- Cookin' (Nagel Heyer, 1995)
- Soulmates with Howard Alden (Nagel Heyer, 2002)
- Straight On Till Morning (Nagel Heyer, 2003)

=== As sideman ===
With Count Basie

- Basie Big Band (Pablo, 1975)
- I Told You So (Pablo, 1976)
- Montreux '77 (Pablo, 1977)
- Prime Time (Pablo, 1977)
- On the Road (Pablo, 1980)
- Basie in Europe (LRC, 1985)
- Live in Japan '78 (Pablo, 1985)
- Fun Time (Pablo, 1991)
- The Golden Years (Pablo, 1996)
- Count Plays Duke (Mama, 1998)
- Swing Shift (Mama, 1999)
- Basie Is Back (Eighty-Eight's, 2006)
- Swinging, Singing, Playing (Mack Avenue, 2009)

With Phil Bodner

- Fine & Dandy (Stash, 1981)
- Highlights in Jazz (Stash, 1985)
- Clarinet Virtuosity (Arbors, 2006)

With Dick Hyman

- The Kingdom of Swing & the Republic of Oop Bop Sh'Bam (Musicmasters, 1989)
- From the Age of Swing (Reference, 1994)
- Swing Is Here (Reference, 1996)

With Flip Phillips

- Flipenstein (Progressive, 1981)
- A Real Swinger (Concord Jazz, 1988)
- Flip Philllips Celebrates His 80th Birthday (Arbors, 2003)

With Sal Salvador

- In Our Own Sweet Way (Stash, 1983)
- Plays the World's Greatest Jazz Standards (Stash, 1984)
- Plays Gerry Mulligan (Stash, 1985)

With Bob Wilber

- Ode to Bechet (Jazzology, 1982)
- Reflections (Bodeswell, 1983)
- On the Road (Bodeswell, 1992)
- Nostalgia (Arbors, 1996)
- The Hamburg Concert (Nagel Heyer, 1996)
- Memories of You (Black and Blue, 1996)

With others

- Peter Appleyard, Barbados Heat (Concord Jazz, 1990)
- Peter Appleyard, Barbados Cool (Concord Jazz, 1991)
- Dave Brubeck, Back Home (Concord Jazz, 1979)
- John Bunch, World War II Love Songs (Groove Jams, 1998)
- Joe Bushkin, Play It Again Joe (United Artists, 1977)
- Ray Charles & Count Basie, Ray Sings, Basie Swings (Hear Music/Concord, 2006)
- Rosemary Clooney & Count Basie, At Long Last (Concord Jazz, 1998)
- Dolly Dawn, Memories of You (Dawn, 1981)
- Dany Doriz, This One's for Basie (Black and Blue, 1994)
- Big Joe Duskin, Blues Rendez-Vous (Back to Blues, 1994)
- Duke Ellington, Four Symphonic Works by Duke Ellington (Musical Heritage Society, 1989)
- Ella Fitzgerald, Digital III at Montreux (Pablo, 1980)
- Ella Fitzgerald, A Classy Pair (Pablo, 1982)
- Johnny Frigo, Live from Studio A in New York City (Chesky, 1989)
- Terry Gibbs, Buddy DeFranco, Herb Ellis, Kings of Swing (Contemporary, 1992)
- Terry Gibbs, Buddy DeFranco, Herb Ellis, A Tribute to Benny Goodman (Contemporary, 2001)
- Scott Hamilton, Swinging Young Scott (Famous Door, 1978)
- Peanuts Hucko, Swing That Music (Star Line, 1992)
- Helen Humes, Helen (Muse, 1981)
- Alberta Hunter, The Glory of Alberta Hunter (Columbia, 1982)
- Alberta Hunter, Look for the Silver Lining (Columbia, 1983)
- Milt Jackson & Count Basie, Milt Jackson + Count Basie + the Big Band Vol. 1 (Pablo, 1978)
- Milt Jackson & Count Basie, Milt Jackson + Count Basie + the Big Band Vol. 2 (Pablo, 1978)
- Carmen Leggio, Tarrytown Tenor (Famous Door, 1978)
- Roger Kellaway, Dick Hyman, Piano Players & Significant Others (Musicmasters, 1990)
- George Kelly, Plays the Music of Don Redman (Stash, 1984)
- George Masso, Choice N.Y.C. Bone (Famous Door, 1979)
- George Masso, A Swinging Case of Masso-Ism (Famous Door, 1981)
- Dave McKenna, No Holds Barred (Famous Door, 1979)
- Danny Moss, Weaver of Dreams (Nagel Heyer, 1995)
- Gerry Mulligan, Little Big Horn (Five, 1983)
- Bucky Pizzarelli & John Pizzarelli, Passion Guitars (Groove Jams, 1998)
- Lou Stein, Live at the Dome (Dreamstreet, 1981)
- Maxine Sullivan, Highlights in Jazz (Storyville, 1999)
- Frank Tate, Live in Belfast (Nagel Heyer, 2001)
- Warren Vache, Blues Walk (Dreamstreet, 1978)
- Marlene VerPlanck, Marlene VerPlanck Loves Johnny Mercer (Audiophile, 1978)
- Phil Wilson, Boston-New York Axis: Phil & Vic (Famous Door, 1980)
- Glenn Zottola, Secret Love (Famous Door, 1982)
- Wild Bill Davison, Wild Bill Davison All Stars (Timeless, 1987)
- Tom Saunders' Wild Bill Davison Band & Guests (Nagel Heyer, 1996)
- Wild Bill Davis Super Trio, That's All (Jazz Connaisseur, 1991)
