= George Masso =

American jazz musician, bandleader, and composer (1926–2019)

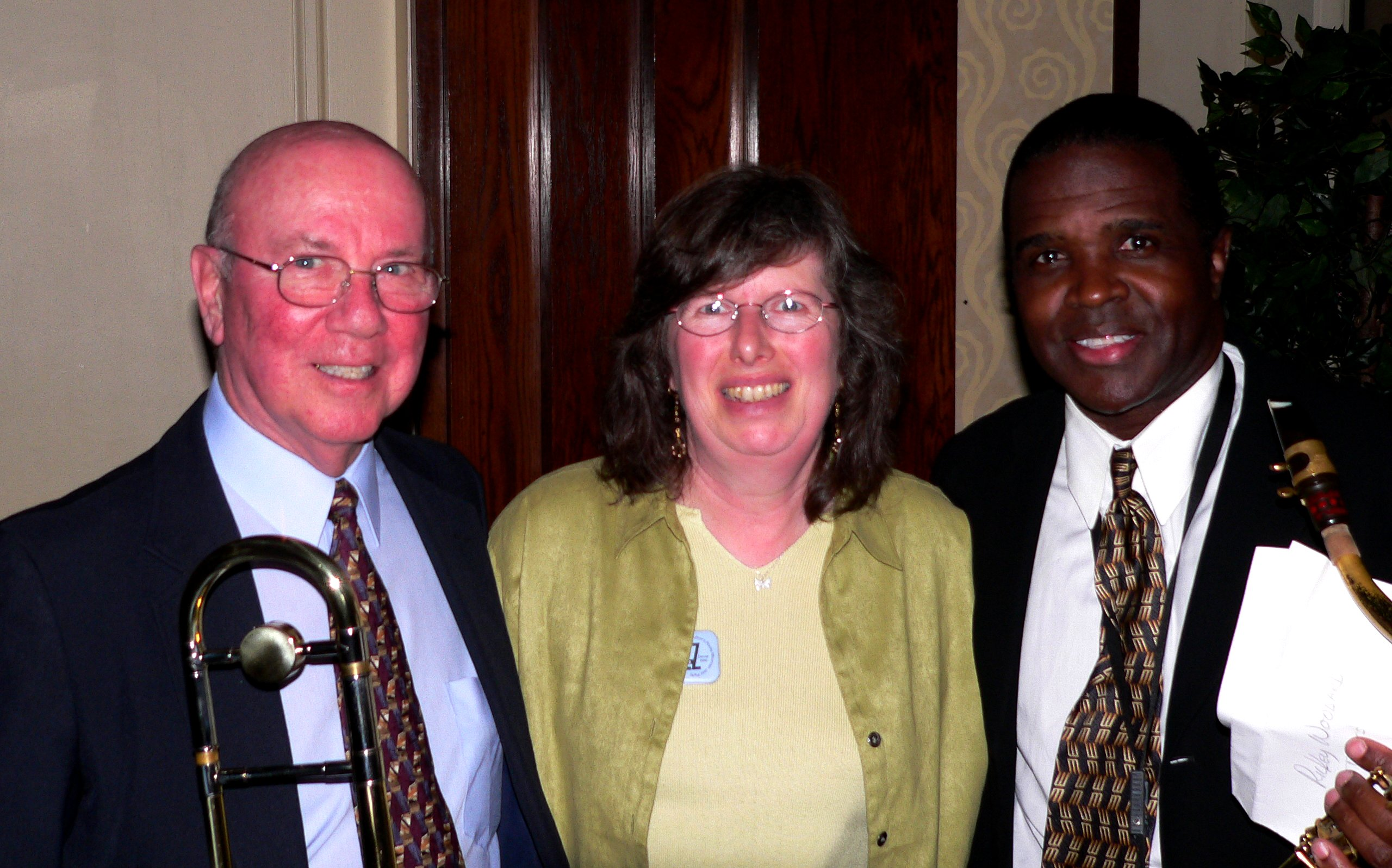
- George Masso (left) and Ricky Woodard

Background information
- Born: November 17, 1926; Cranston, Rhode Island, U.S.
- Died: October 22, 2019 (aged 92)
- Genres: Jazz
- Occupation: Musician
- Instrument(s): Trombone, vibraphone
- Labels: Sackville, Arbors, Nagel-Heyer

George Masso (November 17, 1926 – October 22, 2019) was an American jazz trombonist, bandleader, vibraphonist, and composer specializing in swing and Dixieland. Masso is notable for his work from 1948 to 1950 as a member of the Jimmy Dorsey band.

Masso was born in Cranston, Rhode Island, United States. Masso began learning to play the trumpet, but expanded his diversity by becoming competent on other instruments. He was further inspired by hearing Lou McGarity playing trombone on Benny Goodman's recording of "Yours". Masso secured a two-year spell in the late 1940s in Jimmy Dorsey's band, before finding the life of a professional jazz musician financially difficult, and Masso quit performing. He became a music teacher.

He returned to music in 1973 and performed with Bobby Hackett and Goodman. In the late 1980s and early 1990s, he recorded with Barbara Lea, Bob Haggart, and Yank Lawson.

== Discography ==
=== As leader ===
- Choice N.Y.C. Bone (Famous Door, 1979)
- A Swinging Case of Masso-Ism (Famous Door, 1981)
- Dialogue at Condon's with Al Klink (World Jazz, 1981)
- Pieces of Eight (Dreamstreet, 1982)
- No Frills, Just Music (Famous Door, 1984)
- Just for a Thrill (Sackville, 1990)
- Play Arlen with Spike Robinson (Hep, 1992)
- Let's Be Buddies with Dan Barrett (Arbors, 1994)
- That Old Gang of Mine (Arbors, 1997)
- Just Friends with Ken Peplowski (Nagel Heyer, 2002)

=== As sideman ===
With World's Greatest Jazz Band of Yank Lawson & Bob Haggart

- Plays Cole Porter (World Jazz, 1975)
- Plays Duke Ellington (World Jazz, 1976)
- Plays George Gershwin (World Jazz, 1977)
- On Tour Vol 1 and 2 (World Jazz, 1977)

With others

- Ruby Braff, Variety Is the Spice of Braff (Arbors, 2002)
- Buck Clayton, Buck Clayton Jam Session Vol. 2 (Chiaroscuro, 1975)
- Buck Clayton, A Buck Clayton Jam Session Vol. IV (Chiaroscuro, 1977)
- James L. Dean & Claudio Roditi, On the Run (Cexton, 1993)
- Tommy Gwaltney, Pee Wee Russell's Land of Jazz: A Memorial Tribute (Teaspoon, 1982)
- Benny Goodman, Live at Carnegie Hall 40th Anniversary Concert (Decca, 1978)
- Scott Hamilton & Warren Vache, Skyscrapers (Concord Jazz, 1980)
- Woody Herman, A Great American Evening Vol. 3 (Concord Jazz, 1983)
- Jerry Jerome, Something Old, Something New (Arbors, 1997)
- Eiji Kitamura, No Count (Concord Jazz, 1983)
- Yank Lawson, Plays Mostly the Blues (Audiophile, 1986)
- Barbara Lea, You're the Cats! (Audiophile, 1989)
- Peggy Lee, Love Held Lightly (Angel, 1993)
- Butch Miles, Butch Miles Salutes Gene Krupa (Famous Door, 1982)
- Butch Miles, Introducing the Ivory Coast Suite (Dreamstreet, 1986)
- Eddie Miller, It's Miller Time (Famous Door, 1980)
- Glenn Miller, In the Digital Mood (GRP, 1983)
- Randy Sandke, The Music of Bob Haggart (Arbors, 2002)
- George Shearing, George Shearing in Dixieland (Concord Jazz, 1989)
- Maxine Sullivan, Together (Atlantic, 1987)
- Charlie Ventura, Chazz '77 (Famous Door, 1977)
- Bob Wilber, Bufadora Blow-up (Arbors, 1997)
- Glenn Zottola, Secret Love (Famous Door, 1982)
- Glenn Zottola, Christmas in Jazztime (Dreamstreet, 1986)
