= Cliff Leeman =

American jazz musician

Cliff Leeman (September 10, 1913 – April 26, 1986) was an American jazz drummer. His nickname was "Mr. Time".

Leeman, born in Portland, Maine, United States, played percussion with the Portland Symphony Orchestra at age 13, and toured as a xylophonist on the vaudeville circuit late in the 1920s. He first made his name in the jazz world working in the swing bands of Artie Shaw (1938–39), Glenn Miller (1939), Tommy Dorsey (1939), Charlie Barnet (1940–43), Johnny Long, and Woody Herman (1943–44). After a stint in the Army in 1944, he worked with Don Byas, John Kirby (1944–45), Raymond Scott, Jimmy Dorsey, and Ben Webster.

He left the music industry briefly before joining the Casa Loma Orchestra in 1947, later moving on to Charlie Barnet's orchestra (1949) and Bob Chester's big band ensemble (1949–50). He played on radio and television in the 1950s, in addition to playing live often with Eddie Condon and Bobby Hackett. Later associations include Pee Wee Erwin, Yank Lawson/Bob Haggart, Ralph Sutton, Billy Butterfield, Bob Crosby (1960), Wild Bill Davison (1962), Dukes of Dixieland (1963–64), Peanuts Hucko, Joe Venuti, The Kings of Jazz (1974), Bud Freeman, Don Ewell, the World's Greatest Jazz Band (1976–77), and Jimmy McPartland. He recorded several albums for Fat Cat Jazz in the 1970s.

His drumming can also be heard on some of the early recorded hits of Bill Haley & His Comets.
