= World's Greatest Jazz Band =

American all-star jazz ensemble (1968–78)

The World's Greatest Jazz Band was an all-star jazz ensemble active from 1968 to 1978.

Dick Gibson founded the group at his sixth Jazz Party, an annual event. The group performed mostly Dixieland jazz and recorded extensively. It was co-led by Yank Lawson and Bob Haggart, and did early jazz standards alongside contemporaneous pop songs done in a Dixieland style. Though the group disbanded in 1978, the name was revived several times by Lawson and Haggart for limited engagements.

== Members ==
- Billy Butterfield
- Cutty Cutshall
- Vic Dickenson
- Morey Feld
- Carl Fontana
- Bud Freeman
- Dick Gibson
- Bob Haggart
- Scott Hamilton
- Clancy Hayes
- Eddie Hubble
- Peanuts Hucko
- Keith Ingham
- Gus Johnson
- Roger Kellaway
- Al Klink
- Yank Lawson
- Cliff Leeman
- George Masso
- Lou McGarity
- Johnny Mince
- Bob Miller
- Eddie Miller
- Joe Muranyi
- Chuck Riggs
- Bobby Rosengarden
- Sonny Russo
- Carrie Smith
- Maxine Sullivan
- Ralph Sutton
- Dick Wellstood
- Bob Wilber
- Roy Williams

== Discography ==
- Extra! (Project 3 Total Sound, 1969)
- The World's Greatest Jazzband of Yank Lawson and Bob Haggart (Project 3 Total Sound, 1969)
- Live at the Roosevelt Grill (Atlantic, 1970)
- The World's Greatest Jazzband (Atlantic, 1971)
- What's New? (Atlantic, 1971)
- Hark the Herald Angels Swing (World Jazz, 1972)
- In Concert: Vol. 1 Massey Hall (World Jazz, 1973)
- Good News with Teresa Brewer (Signature, 1973)
- Plays Cole Porter (World Jazz, 1975)
- Plays Rodgers & Hart (World Jazz, 1976)
- Plays Duke Ellington (World Jazz, 1976)
- In Concert (Recorded Live at the Lawrenceville School) (Flying Dutchman, 1976)
- On Tour (World Jazz, 1976)
- On Tour Vol. 1 and 2 (World Jazz, 1977)
- Plays George Gershwin (World Jazz, 1977)
- On Tour II with Maxine Sullivan (World Jazz, 1977)
