= Al Klink =

American jazz saxophonist (1915–1991)

- Klink in 1941

Background information
- Born: December 28, 1915; Danbury, Connecticut, U.S.
- Died: March 7, 1991 (aged 75) Bradenton, Florida, U.S.
- Genres: Swing, jazz
- Instrument: Tenor saxophone
- Formerly of: World's Greatest Jazz Band, Glenn Miller, Benny Goodman, Tommy Dorsey, Glenn Zottola, George Masso

Al Klink (December 28, 1915 in Danbury, Connecticut – March 7, 1991 in Bradenton, Florida) was an American swing jazz tenor saxophonist.

== Career ==
Klink played with Glenn Miller from 1939 to 1942, and is a featured soloist, along with Tex Beneke, on the most well-known version of "In the Mood". When Miller started playing in the U.S. military, Klink played with Benny Goodman and Tommy Dorsey, and did work as a session musician after World War II ended. Klink appeared in the 1941 film Sun Valley Serenade and 1942 film Orchestra Wives.

From 1952 to 1953 he played with the Sauter-Finegan Orchestra. In 1955, he recorded his only session as a bandleader, performing six songs for a Bob Alexander album that won a Grammy Award. In the late-1960s to early-1970s, he was a tenor saxophone doubler on the staff of NBC's Tonight Show Band under Doc Severinsen, where he was an occasional featured soloist. After a hiatus, he returned in 1974 when he began playing with the World's Greatest Jazz Band. In the 1970s, he played with Glenn Zottola and George Masso, and continued playing until the mid-1980s, when he retired to Florida.

== Death ==
Klink died in Bradenton, Florida in 1991.

== Discography ==
- Satan in High Heels (1961)
- Ping Pong Percussion (1961)
- Swing into Spring (1958)

With Mundell Lowe

- Guitar Moods (Riverside, 1956)
- Progressive Jazz (1956)
- Satan in High Heels (soundtrack) (Charlie Parker, 1961)

With Gerry Mulligan

- Holliday with Mulligan (DRG, 1961 [1980]) with Judy Holliday

With Nelson Riddle

- Phil Silvers and Swinging Brass (Columbia, 1957)

With Cootie Williams

- Cootie Williams in Hi-Fi (RCA Victor, 1958)
- Porgy & Bess Revisited (Warner Bros., 1959) with Rex Stewart
