= Martin Litton =

Martin Litton may refer to:

- Martin Litton (environmentalist) (1917–2014), Grand Canyon river runner and conservationist
- Martin Litton (pianist) (born 1957), British jazz pianist
