= Cutshall =

Cutshall is a surname. Notable people with the surname include:

- Cutty Cutshall (1911–1968), American jazz trombonist
- Lindsi Cutshall (born 1990), American soccer player
