= Martin Litton (pianist) =

British jazz pianist (born 1957)

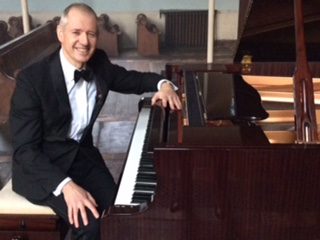
- Martin Litton in 2017

Background information
- Born: Martin Nicholas Litton; 14 May 1957 (age 69); Grays, Essex
- Genres: Ragtime, Stride, Swing and Bebop
- Instrument: Piano
- Years active: 1977–present
- Label: Various independent
- Website: www.martinlitton.com

Martin Litton (born 14 May 1957) is a British jazz pianist born in Grays, Essex, UK, noteworthy for his early work with Kenny Ball from 1983 to 1984 on his tour of the Middle East and tour of Russia and for a recording session with Humphrey Lyttelton. Litton's fluency of style(s) and the historical context he brings to his jazz piano has taken him around the world, playing with and respected by many of the great names in jazz, past and present. His keyboard skills have been honed by his attention to detail and personal discipline both in terms of musicianship as well as knowledge of the development of jazz piano.

An early review summary by Ken Rattenbury of Litton's jazz piano playing has been echoed by many critics bringing similar epithets throughout his career: 'a delicious fun thing bubbles from start to finish, with Martin Litton piano, arranger, a lyrical strider, well versed in the elusive art of accompaniment, lovely soloist, and with a rare way with ragtime'.

Litton has been described as a stride piano expert. His Gramercy Five band recreated the small group swing style of Artie Shaw.

== Early life ==
Litton was born on 14 May 1957 in Grays, Essex, UK, and from the age of eight grew up in Bovingdon, Hertfordshire. He started piano lessons at the age of eleven and soon discovered the music of Jelly Roll Morton. In order to better master the style of this New Orleans pioneer, Litton spent his teens making transcriptions of the piano solos. Martin Litton studied music at Colchester Institute, graduating with a BA (Honours) degree in 1978. There, he met future colleagues Martin Wheatley and Paul Lacy with whom he formed the band The Faculty of Jazz. During his final year, he took time out to play in London with one of the oldest established traditional jazz bands, Steve Lane's Southern Stompers.

== Career ==
=== Early career ===
His playing style is influenced by the likes of Jelly Roll Morton, Willie 'The Lion' Smith and Teddy Wilson to name just a few. An early career breakthrough came through playing with Kenny Ball from 1983 - 1985 on his British and Russian tours and for recording sessions with George Chisholm. By 1987 James Asman was writing of Litton in the Jazz Rag magazine that he possessed an 'ability to play jazz piano in a way that sparkles and swings in sympathy with the clarinettist .... setting him amongst the very best his country has to offer'. The 1990s, saw, inter alia, the release of Litton's First Piano Album. Jazz Journal specifically commented that he had matured and developed his skills and his appreciation of all styles of jazz music whilst remaining true to his, and its, roots. Such development has been a constant theme in Litton's career and the noughties gave reviews praising his knowledge of the styles and the historical development of jazz including Dixieland.

=== 1980–1990: early career success and breakthrough with Kenny Ball ===
After gaining a foothold on the London jazz scene with Steve Lane, Litton joined Harry Gold's Pieces of Eight band before becoming a member in 1983 of Kenny Ball and his Jazzmen. He toured with Kenny Ball for two years notably in Russia and the Middle East. He left the band in 1984 and expanded his repertoire and developed further his musical piano playing styles by playing alongside notable American jazz musicians including Bob Wilbur, Scott Hamilton, George Masso, Peanuts Hucko, Kenny Davern, Joe Muranyi and Al Casey.

=== 1990–2000: European and world tours with the Swedish Jazz Kings ===
During the 1990s Litton continued expanding his range of jazz piano work with leading British musicians including recordings with Humphrey Lyttelton, Wally Fawkes and Digby Fairweather. He toured Britain and Europe with Keith Smith's Hefty Jazz and was pianist with Bob Hunt's Duke Ellington orchestra. It was during this period that he formed his own eight-piece band, Martin Litton's Red Hot Peppers, playing the music of Jelly Roll Morton. He was a regular recording and performing artist with the Swedish Jazz Kings touring Scandinavia, Japan and Australia. His first solo CD 'Martin Litton Jazz Piano' was short listed in Jazz Journal's 1994 critics poll. His next CD 'Falling Castle' was described as 'a gem' by the Jazz Rag magazine. This last CD established Litton firmly with an already familiar audience in France. 'Bulletin hcf' in May 1999 described his playing ability in terms of: rondeur des basses, délicatesse du toucher, stabilité du tempo, tout test réuni pour produire une belle et swinguante musique : bravo Martin!

=== 2000–2010: continued popularity ===
The early part of the noughties through to 2010 saw Martin playing with the Swedish Kings in Australia during which it was noted that 'Litton's playing is quite delicate...and was, a refreshing change from the typical 'steam-roller' approach to Fats Waller's music. His playing within the ensemble was understated and swinging'. Similarly when with an Alyn Shipton quintet in Jazz Ascona Switzerland he showcased a 'fine tribute to Fats Waller'. He continued to tour the UK in between overseas visits and achieved notable success in Bing and Bob, A Tribute to the Crosby Brothers at the Purcell Room London. The late jazz critic Jack Masserik writing of Litton's performance in the Evening Standard noted 'how Martin's knowledge of the styles and development of jazz including Dixieland had been showcased in the octet and that behind the four-man front line, rhythm guitarist Neville Skrimshire tripped a feathery four-to-the bar and pianist Martin Litton strode like a latter-day Joe Sullivan. It was during this time that Litton became noted for his entertaining piano talks, explaining the development of jazz and piano styles before demonstrating by his playing of certain pieces. During this period Litton was approached by the Royal Schools of Music. The introduction of jazz into the examinations of the Associated Board of the Royal Schools of Music meant that a new type of jazz book was needed and Charles Beale's guides were published by the Associated Board itself to which Litton and others in the jazz field contributed by writing test pieces for the student examination board. This aspect of his skill gained wider recognition in programmes for BBC Radio 3 with presenter Alyn Shipton including transmissions of Jazz Library. These latter broadcasts were devoted to the recordings of Morton, Waller and Hines whose piano styles were dissected and commented upon. During and after this period Litton continued working with Pete Long's Bebop Repertory Quintet playing the music of Dizzy Gillespie as well as being the pianist and musical director for a series of CDs featuring Clare Teal. The first of these CDs 'That's The Way It Is' was highly acclaimed and given regular airplay on Michael Parkinson's BBC Radio 2 programme.

=== 2010–present: current projects ===
This current decade sees Litton consistently playing at full stretch. On the album White Heat, the Tuxedo Dance Orchestra featuring Litton delivers a complete performance, including a Debussy-inspired introduction and the seldom-heard verse. Litton performs regularly with the Harry Strutters Hot Rhythm Orchestra and The Jiving Lindy Hoppers Dance Troupe as part of the Swinging at the Cotton Club show, as well as joining smaller gigs and club appearances. These appearances range from accompanist such as to vocalist Janice Day , to a double piano act at the Customs House, South Shields. Litton's musicianship also extends to jazz history especially ragtime. At one such society lecture Litton talked about the history of ragtime, playing pieces from the many important figures in its development including Scott Joplin, Tom Turpin, Joseph Lamb, James Scott and Luckey Roberts. A reminiscence to hold and take Litton forward from the middle of this current decade is a review of his playing with the Buck Clayton Legacy Band when.....'both sets were punctuated by his extraordinarily virtuosic solo piano spot. He condensed the Ellington Orchestra's 20s Washington Wabble into explosive, complex stride, playing all the parts of the orchestra simultaneously.

== Equipment ==
Litton's playing preference is for an acoustic piano although when necessary he uses his own Nord electric keyboard.

== Personal life ==
From his early years at home in Bovingdon, followed by formal piano studies in Colchester, Litton entered the London jazz scene with Steve Lane, before joining Harry Gold's Pieces of Eight band followed by becoming a member in 1983 of Kenny Ball and his Jazzmen. During the 1990s Litton continued expanding his work with leading British musicians including recordings with Humphrey Lyttelton, Wally Fawkes and Digby Fairweather. During the 1991 Hay-on-Wye jazz festival he met and subsequently married Rebekah Morley-Jones. The couple were married in 1992, and the marriage lasted eleven years. They had no children. In 2017 Litton married his partner, the singer / entertainer Janice Day (née David) with whom he continues to perform in cabaret and at jazz festivals. Their theatre shows include the 'Dance Band Divas' and 'Fats Waller in Love'. Martin Litton currently spends his time between his cottage in Hay-on-Wye and his base in south London. His recreation activities include painting, drawing and reading. Litton is an avid cruciverbalist and has won the Times Newspaper crossword competition several times.

== Discography to 1996 and selected recordings ==
- Digby Fairweather Archives, (Rose Cottage Records, RCR 005; 1986)
- John Petters Red Hot Seven (Mixed Salad, Jazzology JCD-176; 1990)
- Solo Art SACD 114 (Martin Litton Jazz Piano album; 1993)
- Jazz Piano (1994; Solo Art)
- Martin Litton Discography (Eurojazz discos No 50 Produced & published by Gerard Bielderman, Netherlands; 1996)
- Bill Greenow: On Rue Bechet (Mistral CD01; 1998)
- Falling Castle CD001 (Martin Litton's Second solo album; 1999)
- A.B.03 CD (Martin Litton & Peter Morgan; 2002)
- Laughing at Life CD (Spats Langham, Martin Litton & Malcolm Sked; 2010)
- White Heat TJO CD (Tuxedo Jazz Orchestra; 2012)

=== With Clare Teal ===
- The Road Less Travelled (Candid Records)
- Orsino's Song (Candid Records)
- That's The Way It Is (Candid Records)

=== With Kenny Davern ===
- Kenny Davern Big Three (1985; Jazzology Records)
- This Old Gang of Ours (1985; Calligraph Records)
- Come Love (1998; Opus 3 Records)

=== With Marty Grosz ===
- Ring Dem Bells (Nagel-Heyer Records)
