= Hiram R. Steele =

American politician

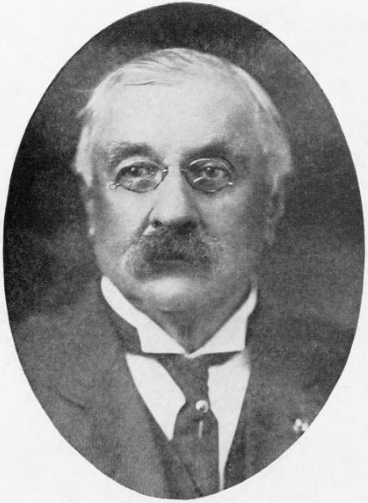

Louisiana Attorney General
- In office 1876–1877

Personal details
- Born: Hiram Roswell Steele; July 10, 1842 Stanstead, Quebec, Province of Canada
- Died: November 21, 1929 (aged 87) Brooklyn, New York, US
- Resting place: Hillside Cemetery
- Spouse: Elizabeth Porter (m. 1877)
- Children: 5, including Porter Steele
- Occupation: Lawyer, judge

Hiram Roswell Steele (July 10, 1842 – November 21, 1929) was a Canadian-American lawyer, judge, and Louisiana Attorney General.

== Life ==
Steele was born on July 10, 1842, in Stanstead, Quebec, the Province of Canada, the son of Sanford Steele and Mary Hinman. Steele moved to Vermont at a young age and studied at St. Johnsbury Academy in St. Johnsbury, Vermont. He then taught at a district school in St. Johnsbury, then at Lyndon and became a principal at Cassville High School in Stanstead. By the spring of 1861, he was assistant teacher and master of mathematics in the Lyndon Academy in Lyndon.

He studied law in the law office of his brother, future Vermont Supreme Court justice Benjamin H. Steele, in Derby Line. In July 1862, during the American Civil War, he helped raise men for military service in Derby Line, Newport, and Orleans County. In August 1862, he was commissioned Captain of Company K, 10th Vermont Infantry Regiment. He served with the company for the next two years. In May 1864, he was severely wounded in the Battle of Spotsylvania Court House. Two weeks later, President Lincoln promoted him to captain and Commissary of Subsistence, and in June he was reported to report for duty in New Orleans, Louisiana. In August, he was assigned Commissary of Subsistence of the cavalry forces, Nineteenth Army Corps, on the staff of General E. J. Davis. In February 1865, he was assigned Commissary of Subsistence of a separate cavalry brigade on the staff of Brigadier-General T. J. Lucas. In July, he was transferred and assigned to Natchez, Mississippi, on the staff of Major-General J. W. Davidson as Depot and Post Commissary at Natchez and Chief Commissary of the Southern District of Mississippi. He was mustered out in January 1866, and was breveted Major in May 1866.

Steele remained in the South after the war, initially working in cotton planting. In 1868, he began practicing law in St. Joseph, Louisiana. He was also elected Parish Judge of Tensas Parish that year and was re-elected to that office in 1870. In 1871, he was appointed District Attorney of the Thirteenth Judicial District of Louisiana and he was elected to a full term in that office in 1872. In 1875, he was appointed Assistant Attorney General of Louisiana, and later that year Governor Kellogg appointed him Judge of the Superior Criminal Court of New Orleans. In 1876, he was appointed Attorney General of Louisiana. After his term as Attorney General expired, he was elected and re-elected District Attorney of the Thirteenth Judicial District. He also served as a member of the 1868 Louisiana Constitutional Convention and the 1879 Louisiana Constitutional Convention. He was a Republican and considered a "carpetbagger", but he was popular with both parties.

In 1890, Steele moved to New York, settling in Brooklyn and becoming senior partner of the law firm Steele, De Friese & Dickson, later known as Steele De Friese & Steele. He became prominent in the Brooklyn Republican Party, and in 1898 Governor Theodore Roosevelt appointed Brooklyn District Attorney, although a year later he was defeated for election to the office. He was a director of the Brooklyn City Railroad Company and the New York Life Insurance Company, and was a trustee and counsel for the South Brooklyn Savings Institution.

Steele was a member of the Sons of the American Revolution, the Grand Army of the Republic, the Loyal Legion, the New England Society, and the Brooklyn Institute of Arts and Science. In 1877, he married Elizabeth Porter. Their children, all born in Natchez, Mississippi, were Porter, Elizabeth Hinman, Roswell Hiram, Charles Messenger, and Henry Sanford.

Steele died at home of diabetes and heart disease on November 21, 1929. He was buried in Hillside Cemetery in Scotch Plains, New Jersey.

Legal offices
Preceded by William H. Hunt	Attorney General of Louisiana; 1876–1877	Succeeded by Horatio Nash Ogden
Preceded by Josiah Taylor Marean	Brooklyn District Attorney; 1899	Succeeded by John F. Clarke
