= Jonathan Russell (violinist) =

- Born: April 27, 1995 (age 30); Bronx, New York, U.S.
- Genres: Jazz, folk, chamber jazz
- Occupations: Musician, composer, arranger, producer
- Instrument: Violin
- Years active: 2003–present
- Label: Balding Lion
- Website: www.jonathanjazz.com

Jonathan "Jazz" Russell (born April 27, 1995) is an American jazz violinist, composer, and producer from New York City.

He began playing in New York City nightclubs at the age of seven, with traditional or dixieland jazz ensembles. At the age of nine he performed at the New Orleans Jazz and Heritage Festival. In 2005 he won "Best Improv" for string players under the age of 13 in the American String Teachers Association's Alternative Styles competition. In 2008 during a tour of Hungary, he was given the Ambassador's Award for Music Diplomacy by the U.S. Embassy in Hungary. In July 2009, he was awarded one of the Daniel Pearl Memorial Violins by Mark O'Connor and the faculty at the inaugural O'Connor Fiddle Camp in New York City. In 2010 Russell received an Honorable Mention in the 2010 ASCAP Young Jazz Composer Awards for his composition in honor of Daniel Pearl entitled "Danny's Groove".

He has performed with Wynton Marsalis and the Jazz at Lincoln Center Orchestra, Bucky Pizzarelli, Ed Polcer, Les Paul, Joe Muranyi and numerous jazz bands from throughout the United States and Europe. He is active as a performer in the New York metropolitan area as well as on the national jazz festival circuit. Russell released his first self produced CD in 2006 entitled Sheik of Araby followed by Puttin' on the Ritz in 2008 and Duets in 2009.

As a solo artist he was inter alia part of the Newport Folk Festival in July 2021.

As of 2021, Russell is self-employed, producing instrumentals for numerous companies including Microsoft and Visa.
