= Barbara Lea =

American jazz singer (1929–2011)

- Born: Barbara Ann LeCocq; April 10, 1929; Detroit, Michigan, U.S.
- Died: December 26, 2011 (aged 82) Raleigh, North Carolina
- Genres: Jazz; swing; dixieland; cabaret
- Occupation: Singer
- Years active: 1951–2007
- Labels: Fantasy; Challenge; Audiophile
- Website: www.barbaralea.com

Barbara Lea (April 10, 1929 – December 26, 2011) was an American jazz singer.

== Music career ==
Lea was born and raised in Detroit. Her father was a clarinetist before becoming attorney general of Michigan. He changed the family name from LeCocq to Leacock, which she changed to Lea when beginning her singing career. She decided at an early age to become a singer, participating in contests and singing with dance bands. She attended Wellesley College near Boston and studied music theory. She worked at the Storyville club in Boston when singer Lee Wiley performed there in the early 1950s. Her debut solo album, Woman in Love, was released in 1955.

She became an actress during the 1960s, then moved to California in the 1970s and received a degree in drama from California State University, Northridge.

In the 1970s, Lea was invited to the National Public Radio series American Popular Song with Alec Wilder and Friends. In 1976, she appeared in two shows, one featuring the songs of Willard Robison and one featuring songs performed and recorded by Lee Wiley.

Lea appeared in the JVC, Kool, and Newport Jazz Festivals several times, but her increasing devotion to the songs as written led to concerts of the works of Rodgers and Hart, Arthur Schwartz, Cy Coleman, Cole Porter, Hoagy Carmichael, and the Gershwins, as well as cabaret appearances devoted to Kurt Weill, Jerome Kern, Johnny Mercer, and Yip Harburg.

She died in 2011 from complications of Alzheimer's disease.

== Discography ==
- A Woman in Love (Riverside, 1955)
- Barbara Lea with the Johnny Windhurst Quintets (Prestige, 1956)
- Lea in Love (Prestige, 1956)
- This Could Lead to Love with Mundell Lowe (Riverside, 1957)
- The Devil Is Afraid of Music (Audiophile, 1977)
- Remembering Lee Wiley (Audiophile, 1978)
- Do It Again (Audiophile, 1983)
- Hoagy's Children with Bob Dorough, Dick Sudhalter (Audiophile, 1983)
- You're the Cats! with the Lawson-Haggart Band (Audiophile, 1989)
- Getting Some Fun Out of Life with Mr. Tram Associates with Daryl Sherman, Dick Sudhalter, Loren Schoenberg (Audiophile, 1989)
- Sweet and Low with the Lawson-Haggart Band (Audiophile, 1990)
- Songs from the Original Broadway Production of Pousse-Cafe with Ellis Larkins (Audiophile, 1992)
- At the Atlanta Jazz Party with Ed Polcer (Jazzology, 1993)
- Find and Dandy with Keith Ingham (Challenge, 1996)
- Are Mad About the Boy: The Songs of Noel Coward with Keith Ingham (Challenge, 2000)
- The Melody Lingers On (2002)
- Celebrate Vincent Youmans with Keith Ingham (Challenge, 2004)
- Our Love Rolls On (2004)
- Deep in a Dream (2005)
- Black Butterfly (2006)
- Do You Know What It Means to Miss New Orleans (Audiophile, 2007)

=== As guest ===
- Benny Carter, Benny Carter Songbook Volume II (Musicmasters, 1997)
- Loren Schoenberg, Solid Ground (Musicmastsers, 1988)
- Loren Schoenberg, Just A-Settin' and A-Rockin' (Musicmasters, 1990)
- Loren Schoenberg, Out of This World (TCB, 1998)
- Dick Sudhalter, Melodies Heard Melodies Sweet (Challenge, 1999)
