= Bob Wilber =

American jazz clarinetist, composer, and saxophonist (1928–2019)

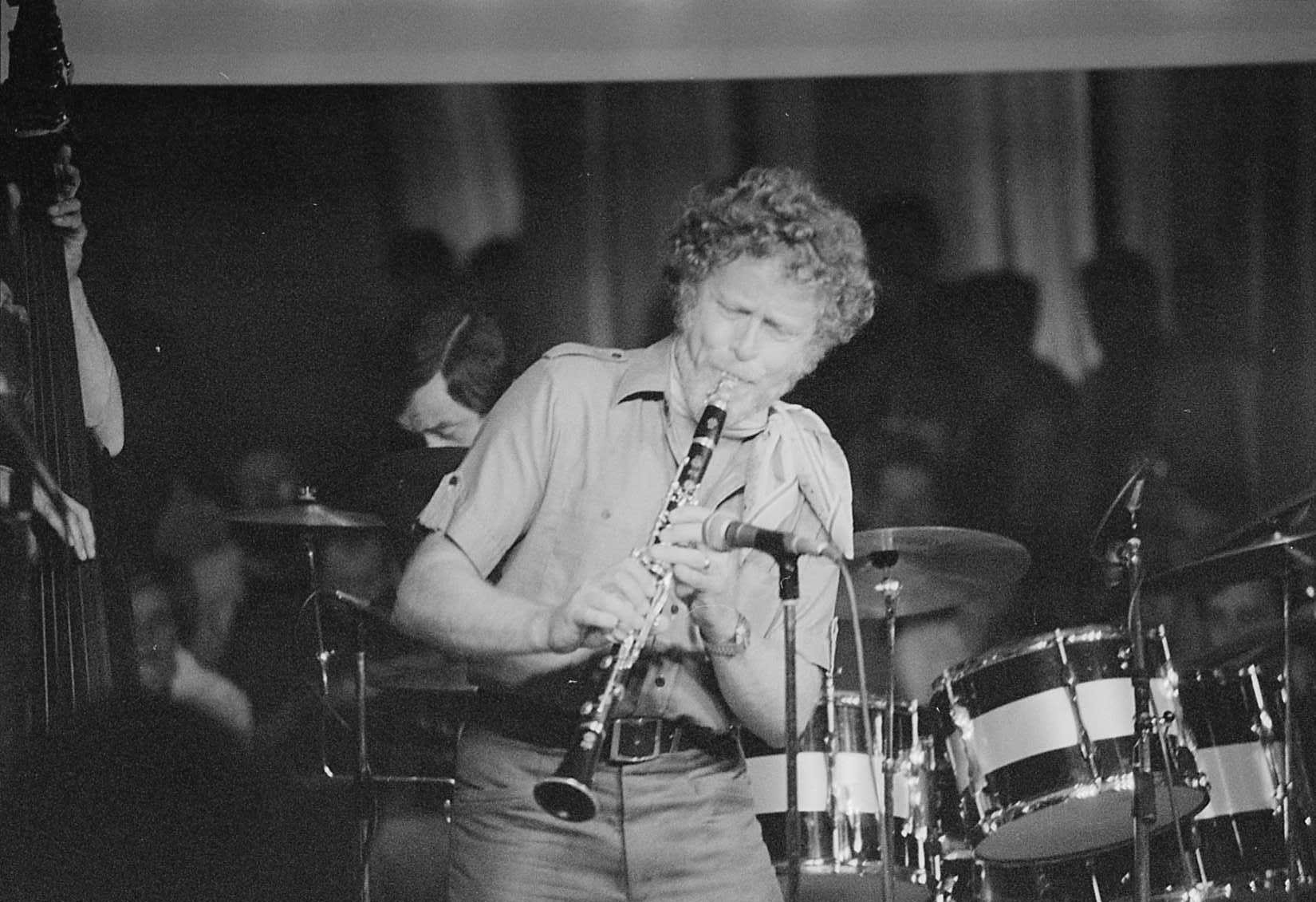
- Wilber at the North Sea Jazz Festival in the late 1970s

Background information
- Born: Robert Sage Wilber; March 15, 1928; New York City, U.S.
- Died: August 4, 2019 (aged 91) Chipping Campden, England
- Genres: Jazz, dixieland
- Occupation: Musician
- Instruments: Saxophone, clarinet
- Years active: 1940s–2010s
- Label: Arbors

Robert Sage Wilber (March 15, 1928 – August 4, 2019) was an American jazz clarinetist, saxophonist, and band leader. Although his scope covers a wide range of jazz, Wilber was a dedicated advocate of classic styles, working throughout his career to present traditional jazz pieces in a contemporary manner. He played with many distinguished jazz leaders in the 1950s and 1960s, including Bobby Hackett, Benny Goodman, Sidney Bechet, Jack Teagarden and Eddie Condon. In the late 1960s, he was an original member of the World's Greatest Jazz Band, and in the early '70s of Soprano Summit, a band which gained wide attention. In the late 1970s, he formed the Bechet Legacy Band.

Wilber was active in jazz education, including working as director of the Smithsonian Jazz Repertory Ensemble. He wrote for films, including The Cotton Club. In his autobiography, Music Was Not Enough, he recounts his childhood, meeting his mentor Sidney Bechet, in 1946, and his struggles as a musician in the 1950s and 1960s. He died at the age of 91 in 2019.

== Early life ==
Robert Sage Wilber, a "superb soprano saxophonist, a classic clarinetist, a gifted arranger and composer, and an invaluable preserver and enhancer of jazz tradition", was born in New York City on March 15, 1928. He became interested in jazz at the age of three when his father brought home a recording of Duke Ellington's song "Mood Indigo". In 1935, the family moved to the affluent suburb of Scarsdale, New York. At the age of thirteen, Wilber began formal clarinet study under his first teacher, Willard Briggs. He began listening to jazz from New Orleans, Kansas City, and Chicago by Duke Ellington, Louis Armstrong, Jelly Roll Morton, Eddie Condon, and Frank Teschemacher. He played jazz in high school and with his friends formed a "hot club", listening and jamming to records. Wilber graduated from high school in 1945.

Although his parents wanted him to attend an Ivy League college, he was set on becoming a musician. He attempted to compromise with his parents by attending the Eastman School of Music in Rochester, New York, in the fall of 1945. But after one term at Eastman, he dropped out and moved back to New York City to "hang out on Fifty-second Street and in the Village".

== The Wildcats ==
In 1945, Wilber formed the Wildcats, which included pianist Dick Wellstood and trombonist Eddie Hubble. The Wildcats were the first jazz group in New York to "do what Lu Watters and Turk Murphy had been doing on the Coast – playing the music of the Hot Five and the Red Hot Peppers and the Creole Jazz Band." The group performed regularly at Jimmy Ryan's club over the next two years and was recorded in 1947 by Ramp-art Records. Wilber worked with some of the best traditional jazz musicians of the era, including Muggsy Spanier, Baby Dodds, Danny Barker, Bud Freeman, Pee Wee Russell, George Wettling, Jimmy McPartland, Wild Bill Davison, and James P. Johnson.

== Meeting Bechet ==
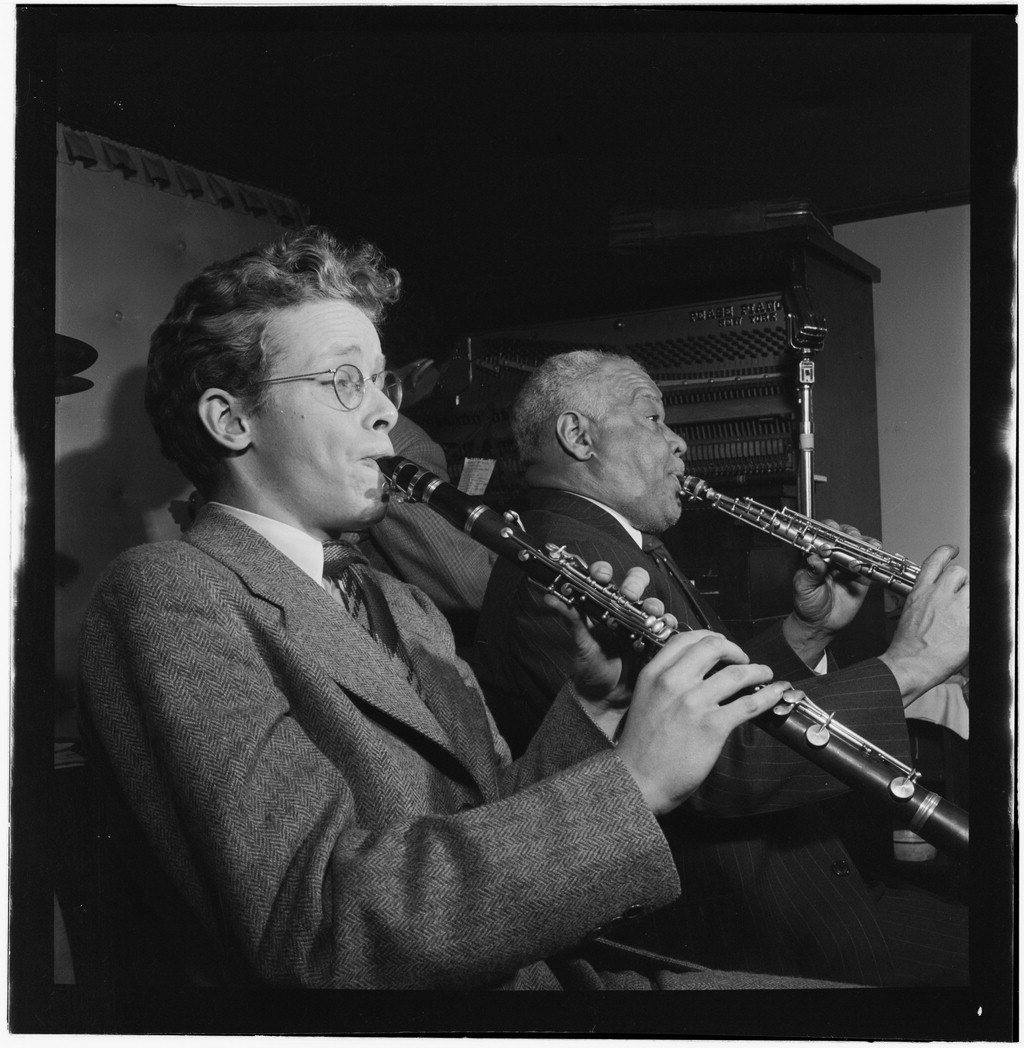
Bob Wilber and Sidney Bechet, Jimmy Ryan's (Club), New York, c. January 1947; image: William P. Gottlieb

Sidney Bechet was one of the most accomplished and influential musicians of the post World War I period and was viewed by many as the best clarinetist of his time. Nevertheless, Bechet's primary instrument eventually became the soprano saxophone. In 1944, Wilber had become fascinated with Bechet's sound, and later that year, when Wilber was sixteen, he was introduced to Bechet through Mezz Mezzrow. He found out there was an opening for a pupil out at Bechet's house in Brooklyn, and so he became a Bechet pupil. In the spring of 1945, he began studying both clarinet and soprano saxophone under Bechet and eventually lived with him for several months. He often sat in with Bechet at Jimmy Ryan's and they often performed duets. In 1948, Bechet sent Wilber to Nice, France, in his absence to perform at the first jazz festival. At the festival, Wilber's group shared the bill with Louis Armstrong and his Allstars. Wilber recorded for Columbia Records, Commodore, and Circle with Bechet and with his own group in the late 1940s.

== Boston era ==
In 1948, Wilber formed a trio to play at intermissions at the Savoy Café in Boston. The trio featured traditional New Orleans-style jazz (dixieland). Eventually, Wilber expanded the band to a sextet and was booked as the main attraction: Bob Wilber and the Dixieland Band. This group featured Wilber on clarinet and soprano sax, Henry Goodwin on trumpet, Jimmy Archey on trombone, Dick Wellstood on piano, Johnny Fields on bass, and Tommy Benford on drums. Wilber gained a strong following in Boston and the Savoy gig lasted through the better part of 1949. The Savoy also led to other opportunities to play in the New York City area through 1950, most notably at Jimmy Ryan's and the Stuyvesant Hotel.

Bob Wilber continued playing right up until 2017.

== Discography ==
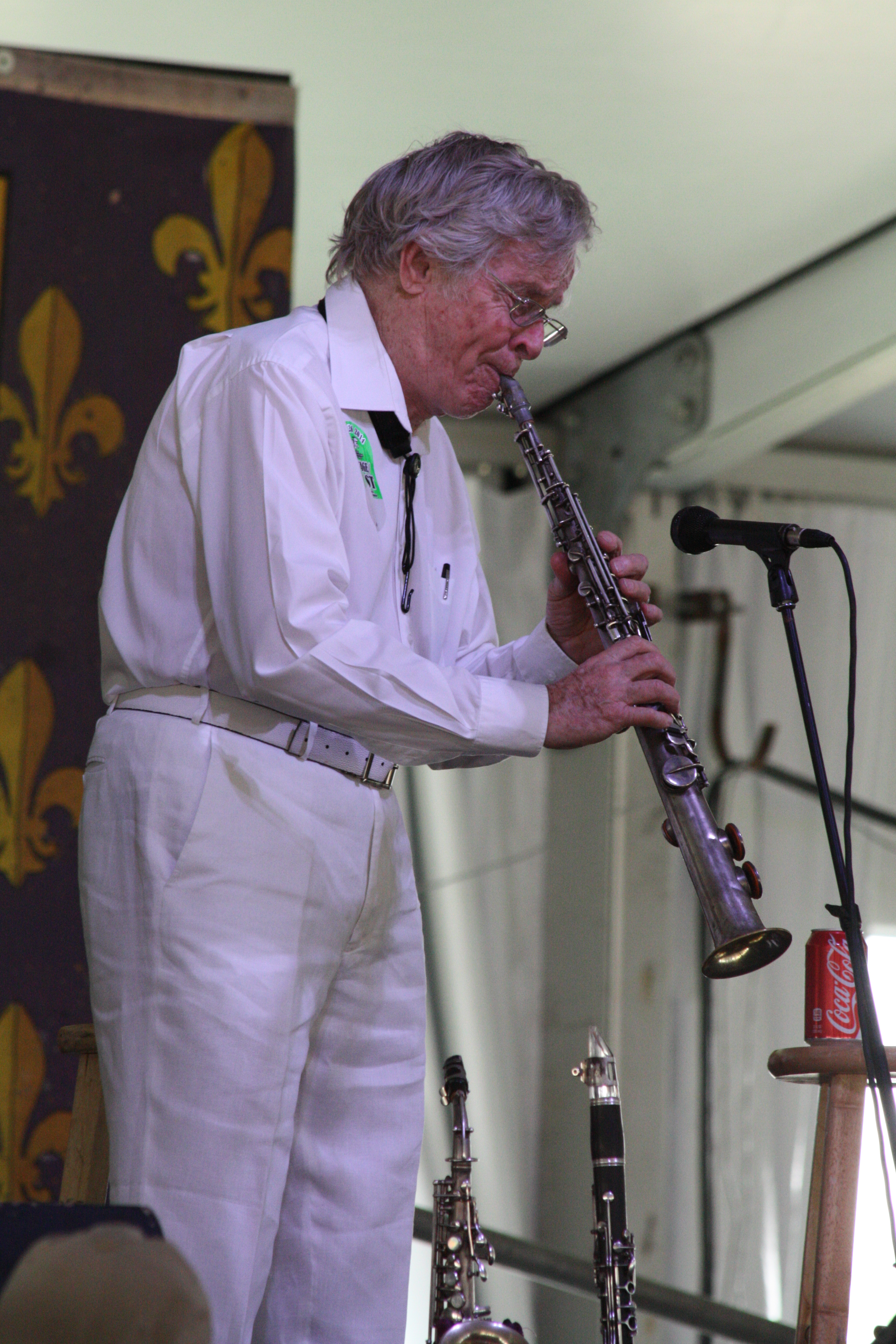
Wilber performing at the 2014 New Orleans Jazz & Heritage Festival

=== As leader ===
- New Clarinet in Town (Classic Editions, 1960)
- For Saxes Only! (Music Minus One, 1962)
- Close as Pages in a Book with Maxine Sullivan (Monmouth Evergreen, 1969)
- No More Blues (MMO Studios, 1972)
- Soprano Summit with Kenny Davern (World Jazz, 1974)
- Soprano Summit in Concert with Kenny Davern, Marty Grosz, Ray Brown, Jake Hanna (Concord Jazz, 1976)
- Spreadin' Joy (Classic Jazz, 1976)
- Evolution of the Blues (Music Minus One, 1976)
- Bob Wilber and the Scott Hamilton Quartet (Chiaroscuro, 1977)
- Sherman Shuffle with Buddy Tate (Sackville, 1978)
- In the Mood for Swing with Lars Erstrand (Phontastic, 1979)
- Dizzyfingers (Bodeswell, 1980)
- Reflections (Bodeswell, 1983)
- Django's Music with Mike Peters, Bireli Lagrene (Stash, 1985)
- Ode to Bechet (Jazzology, 1986)
- Summit Reunion with Kenny Davern (Chiaroscuro, 1990)
- The Music of Hoagy Carmichael with Maxine Sullivan (Audiophile, 1993)
- Summit Reunion 1992 with Kenny Davern, Milt Hinton, Dick Hyman, Bucky Pizzarelli (Chiaroscuro, 1994)
- The Bob Wilber Dick Wellstood Duet (Progressive, 1984)
- Horns A-Plenty (Arbors, 1994)
- Bean: Bob Wilber's Tribute to Coleman Hawkins (Arbors, 1995)
- Nostalgia (Arbors, 1996)
- Bob Wilber's Bechet Legacy, The Hamburg Concert / Tribute to Legend (Nagel Heuer Records GmbH, 1996)
- A Perfect Match with Dick Hyman (Arbors, 1998)
- You Ain't Heard Nothin' Yet: Summit Reunion Plays Some Al Jolson Songs with Kenny Davern (Jazzology, 2000)
- Fletcher Henderson's Unrecorded Arrangements for Benny Goodman (Arbors, 2000)
- Summit Reunion in Atlanta with Kenny Davern (Jazzology, 2001)
- Benny Goodman Arrangements Volume 2 (Arbors, 2003)
- Yearnings with Bobby Gordon (Arbors, 2003)
- Swinging the Changes with Nik Payton (Arbors, 2008)
- The Sidney Bechet Society Presents Bob Wilber & Dick Hyman (2009)
- Bob Wilber Is Here (Arbors, 2010)
- Rampage (Arbors, 2011)
- Birch Hall Concerts Live with Glenn Zottola (Classic Jazz, 2013)

With Soprano Summit

- Chalumeau Blue (Chiaroscuro, 1976)
- The Meridian (Fat Cat's Jazz, 1977)
- Crazy Rhythm (Chiaroscuro, 1977)
- Live at Concord '77 (Concord Jazz, 1978)
- Recorded Live at Iliana Jazz Club (Storyville, 1996)
- 1975...And More! (Arbors, 2008)

=== As sideman ===
With Sidney Bechet

- Creole Reeds (Riverside, 1956)
- The Grand Master of the Soprano Saxophone and Clarinet (Columbia, 1956)

With Ruby Braff

- Holiday in Braff (Bethlehem, 1955)
- Easy Now (RCA Victor, 1959)
- Adoration of the Melody (Bethlehem, 1978)
- The Mighty Braff (Affinity, 1982)

With Benny Goodman

- Happy Session (Columbia/CBS, 1959)
- Fascinating Rhythm (Chess, 1980)

With Bobby Hackett

- Hawaii Swings (Capitol, 1960)
- Creole Cookin (Verve, 1967)
- From the Jazz Vault (1979)

With Dick Hyman

- Say It with Music (World Jazz, 1980)
- Jelly & James (Sony Masterworks, 1992)

With Ralph Sutton

- The Night They Raided Sunnie's (Blue Angel Jazz Club, 1969)
- Live at Sunnie's Rendezvous Vol. 2 (Storyville, 1999)
- Featuring Bob Wilber Vol. 3 (Storyville, 2001)

With The World's Greatest Jazzband of Yank Lawson & Bob Haggart

- The World's Greatest Jazzband of Yank Lawson and Bob Haggart (Project 3 Total Sound, 1969)
- Live at the Roosevelt Grill (Atlantic, 1970)
- What's New? (Atlantic, 1971)
- Hark the Herald Angels Swing (1972)
- In Concert: Vol. 1 Massey Hall (World Jazz, 1973)
- Good News (Signature, 1974)
- In Concert: Recorded Live at the Lawrenceville School (Flying Dutchman, 1976)
- At Manchester Trade Hall England 1971 (Arbors, 2006)

With others

- Louis Armstrong, Sidney Bechet, Kid Ory, Voyage a La Nouvelle Orleans (CBS, 1972)
- Dick Cary, The Amazing Dick Cary (Circle, 1981)
- Lee Castle, Dixieland Heaven (Davis, 1957)
- Jim Chapin, Profile of a Jazz Drummer: Skin Tight (Classic Jazz, 1977)
- Buck Clayton, A Buck Clayton Jam Session Vol. 3: Jazz Party Time (Chiaroscuro, 1976)
- Wild Bill Davison, with Strings Attached (Columbia, 1957)
- Duke Ellington, Symphony in Black (Smithsonian 1981)
- Bud Freeman, Song of the Tenor (Philips, 1976)
- Lionel Hampton, At Newport '78
- Max Kaminsky, Ambassador of Jazz (Westminster, 1959)
- Lou McGarity, Blue Lou (Argo, 1960)
- Jimmy McPartland, Dixieland at Carnegie Hall (1958)
- Jimmy McPartland, That Happy Dixieland Jazz (RCA, 1960)
- Geoff Muldaur, Is Having a Wonderful Time (Reprise, 1975)
- Flip Phillips, Celebrates His 80th Birthday at the March of Jazz 1995 (Arbors, 2003)
- Rex Stewart, Henderson Homecoming (United Artists, 1959)
- Billy Strayhorn, Lush Life (Red Baron 1992)
- Widespread Depression Orchestra, Rockin' in Rhythm (Phontastic, 1980)

== General sources ==
- Wilber, Bob. Music Was Not Enough. Oxford University Press, 1988.
- Encyclopedia of Popular Music. Grove's Dictionaries, 1998.
- Bob Wilber Papers, 1943–2006, University of New Hampshire, Durham, NH
