= William H. Hunt =

American judge (1823–1884)

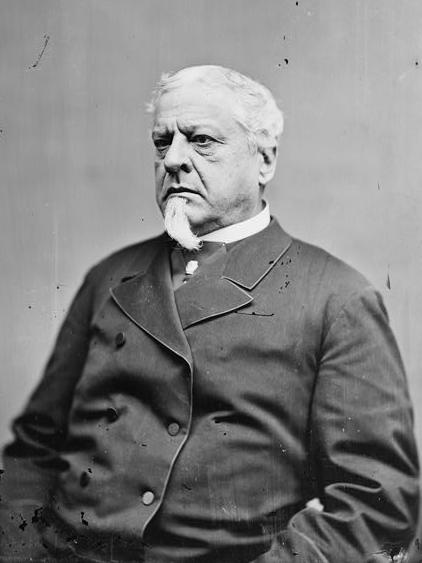

Minister to the Russian Empire
- In office August 23, 1882 – February 27, 1884
- President: Chester A. Arthur
- Preceded by: John W. Foster
- Succeeded by: Alphonso Taft

29th United States Secretary of the Navy
- In office March 7, 1881 – April 16, 1882
- President: James A. Garfield; Chester A. Arthur
- Preceded by: Nathan Goff Jr.
- Succeeded by: William E. Chandler

Judge of the Court of Claims
- In office May 15, 1878 – March 11, 1881
- Appointed by: Rutherford B. Hayes
- Preceded by: Ebenezer Peck
- Succeeded by: Glenni William Scofield

22nd Attorney General of Louisiana
- In office 1876
- Governor: William Pitt Kellogg
- Preceded by: Alexander Pope Field
- Succeeded by: Hiram R. Steele

Personal details
- Born: William Henry Hunt; June 12, 1823 Charleston, South Carolina, U.S.
- Died: February 27, 1884 (aged 60) Saint Petersburg, Russian Empire
- Resting place: Oak Hill Cemetery; Washington, D.C., U.S.
- Education: Yale University; Yale Law School

Military service
- Branch/service: Confederate States Army
- Years of service: 1862
- Rank: Colonel
- Battles/wars: American Civil War

William Henry Hunt (June 12, 1823 – February 27, 1884) was an American politician and jurist who served as the 29th United States Secretary of the Navy, Minister to the Russian Empire and a judge of the Court of Claims.

== Early life ==
Hunt was born on June 12, 1823, in Charleston, South Carolina, He was the youngest of five sons born to Louisa (née Gaillard) Hunt (1786–1850), sister of U.S. Senator John Gaillard, and Thomas Hunt (1780–1830), who had been born in Nassau, Bahamas where his grandfather Robert Hunt held the position of Governor-General of the Bahamas for many years. His father was a member of the Louisiana State Legislature, a prominent lawyer, and a successful planter. Among his siblings was Theodore Gaillard Hunt, a U.S. Representative from Louisiana, Randell Hunt, a Louisiana State Senator, Dr. Thomas Hunt Jr., a founder of the Medical College of Louisiana and president of the University of Louisiana (now Tulane University).

He attended Yale University and Yale Law School, then read law with Theodore Hunt and Randell Hunt in New Orleans.

== Career ==
He entered private practice in New Orleans from 1844 to 1878. He served as a colonel in the Confederate States Army in 1862. He was an acting professor of civil law for the University of Louisiana (now Tulane University) in 1866. He was Attorney General of Louisiana in 1876.

=== Federal judicial service ===
Hunt was nominated by President Rutherford B. Hayes on April 18, 1878, to a seat on the Court of Claims (later the United States Court of Claims) vacated by Judge Ebenezer Peck. He was confirmed by the United States Senate on May 15, 1878, and received his commission the same day. His service terminated on March 11, 1881, due to his resignation.

=== Secretary of the Navy ===
Hunt served as United States Secretary of the Navy from 1881 to 1882, in the cabinets of President James A. Garfield and President Chester A. Arthur.

=== Minister to Russia ===
Hunt served as Envoy Extraordinary and Minister Plenipotentiary to the Russian Empire for the United States Department of State from 1882 until his death in February 1884 in Saint Petersburg.

== Personal life ==
Hunt was married to Elizabeth Ridgely Hunt (d. 1864), daughter of Commandant Charles Goodwin Ridgely and the former Cornelia Louisiana Livingston (a granddaughter of Walter Livingston and Chancellor Robert R. Livingston). Together, Elizabeth and William were the parents of seven children, six sons and one daughter, including:

- Ridgely Hunt (1854–1916), a Lt. in the U.S. Navy.
- Thomas Hunt (1855–1933), who married Helen Jewett, a daughter of U.S. Representative Hugh Judge Jewett, in 1888.
- Randell Hunt (1856–1898)
- William Henry Hunt Jr. (1857–1949), the Attorney General of Montana, Governor of Puerto Rico and Federal judge.
- Livingston Hunt (1859–1943), a Rear Admiral in the U.S. Navy who married Catharine Howland Hunt (1868–1963), a daughter of architect Richard Morris Hunt.
- Cornelia Ridgely Hunt (1861–1930), who married Dr. William Kelly Newton (1850–1909) in 1905.
- Gaillard Hunt (1862–1924), a historian who married Mary Goodfellow.

After the death of his first wife in 1864, he remarried to Sarah Harrison Barker (1819–1908), a daughter of New York merchant John T. Adams, in 1866.

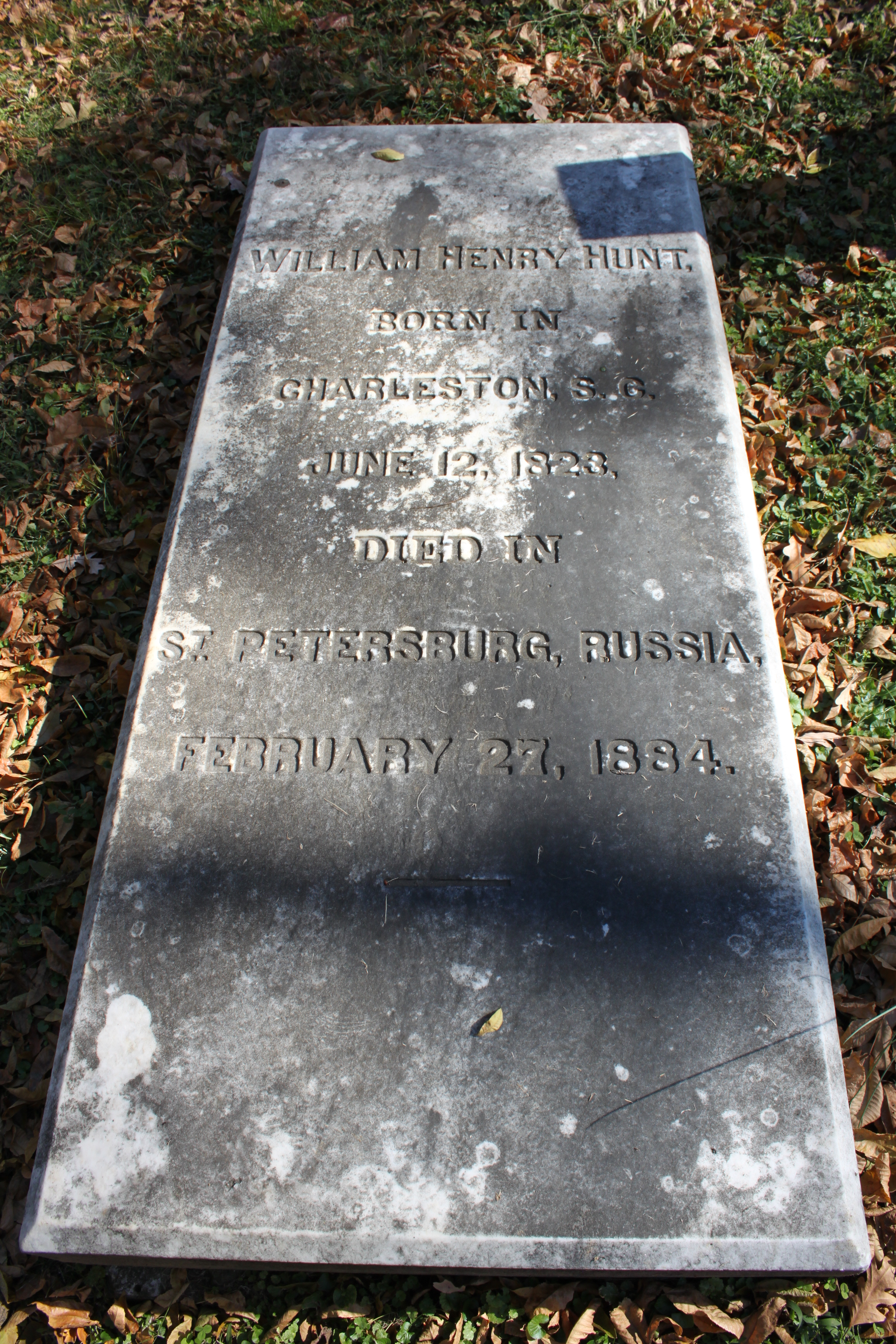
Grave of Hunt at Oak Hill Cemetery

He died on February 27, 1884, in Saint Petersburg, Russian Empire. His body was returned to the United States and after a funeral at St. John's Church in Washington, D.C. He was buried at Oak Hill Cemetery in Washington. He was a member of The Boston Club of New Orleans.

== Legacy and honors ==
Two ships in the United States Navy have been named USS Hunt for Hunt.

Legal offices
Preceded by Alexander Pope Field	Attorney General of Louisiana; 1876	Succeeded by Hiram R. Steele
Preceded by Ebenezer Peck	Judge of the Court of Claims; 1878–1881	Succeeded by Glenni William Scofield
Government offices
Preceded by Nathan Goff Jr.	29th United States Secretary of the Navy; 1881–1882	Succeeded by William E. Chandler
Diplomatic posts
Preceded by John W. Foster	Envoy Extraordinary and Minister Plenipotentiary to the Russian Empire; 1882–1884	Succeeded by Alphonso Taft
