= Glenn Zottola =

- Born: Glenn Paul Zottola; April 28, 1947 (age 79); Port Chester, New York, U.S.
- Genres: Jazz
- Occupation: Musician
- Instruments: Trumpet, saxophone
- Years active: 1960–present
- Labels: Angel, Atlantic, Chiaroscuro, Classic Jazz, Concord, Dreamstreet, Famous Door, Harbinger, Progressive
- Website: www.glennzottola.com

Glenn Paul Zottola (born April 28, 1947) is an American jazz trumpeter and saxophonist.

He is known for his work with Lionel Hampton, Benny Goodman, and Bob Wilber, and has accompanied a broad range of vocalists, including Mel Tormé, Frank Sinatra, Peggy Lee, Ella Fitzgerald, and Joe Williams. He has recorded over 50 albums and, in 1988, was a featured soloist at the 50th anniversary of Benny Goodman's Carnegie Hall Concert. In 1995, Zottola was bandleader on the Suzanne Somers daytime TV talk show at Universal Studios.

== Discography ==
=== As leader ===
- Live at Eddie Condon's (Dreamstreet, 1981)
- Secret Love (Famous Door, 1982)
- Stardust (Famous Door, 1984)
- Christmas in Jazztime (Dreamstreet, 1986)
- Bechet Legacy: Birch Hall Concerts Live with Bob Wilber (Classic Jazz, 2013)
- Charlie Parker with Strings Revisited (Classic Jazz, 2015)

=== As sideman ===
With Butch Miles

- Butch Miles Salutes Chick Webb (Famous Door, 1980)
- Butch Miles Swings Some Standards (Famous Door, 1981)
- Butch Miles Salutes Gene Krupa (Famous Door, 1982)
- More Miles... More Standards (Famous Door, 1985)

With Bob Wilber

- Bob Wilber and the Bechet Legacy (Bodeswell, 1981)
- Ode to Bechet (Jazzology, 1982)
- On the Road (Bodeswell, 1992)

With others

- Mousey Alexander, The Mouse Roars! (Famous Door, 1979)
- Steve Allen, Steve Allen Plays Jazz Tonight (Concord Jazz, 1993)
- Phil Bodner et al, Highlights in Jazz (Stash, 1985)
- George Kelly, Plays the Music of Don Redman (Stash, 1984)
- Peggy Lee, Love Held Lightly (Angel, 1993)
- George Masso, A Swinging Case of Masso-Ism (Famous Door, 1981)
- George Masso, No Frills, Just Music (Famous Door, 1984)
- Maxine Sullivan, Together (Atlantic, 1987)
