= Morey Feld =

American drummer

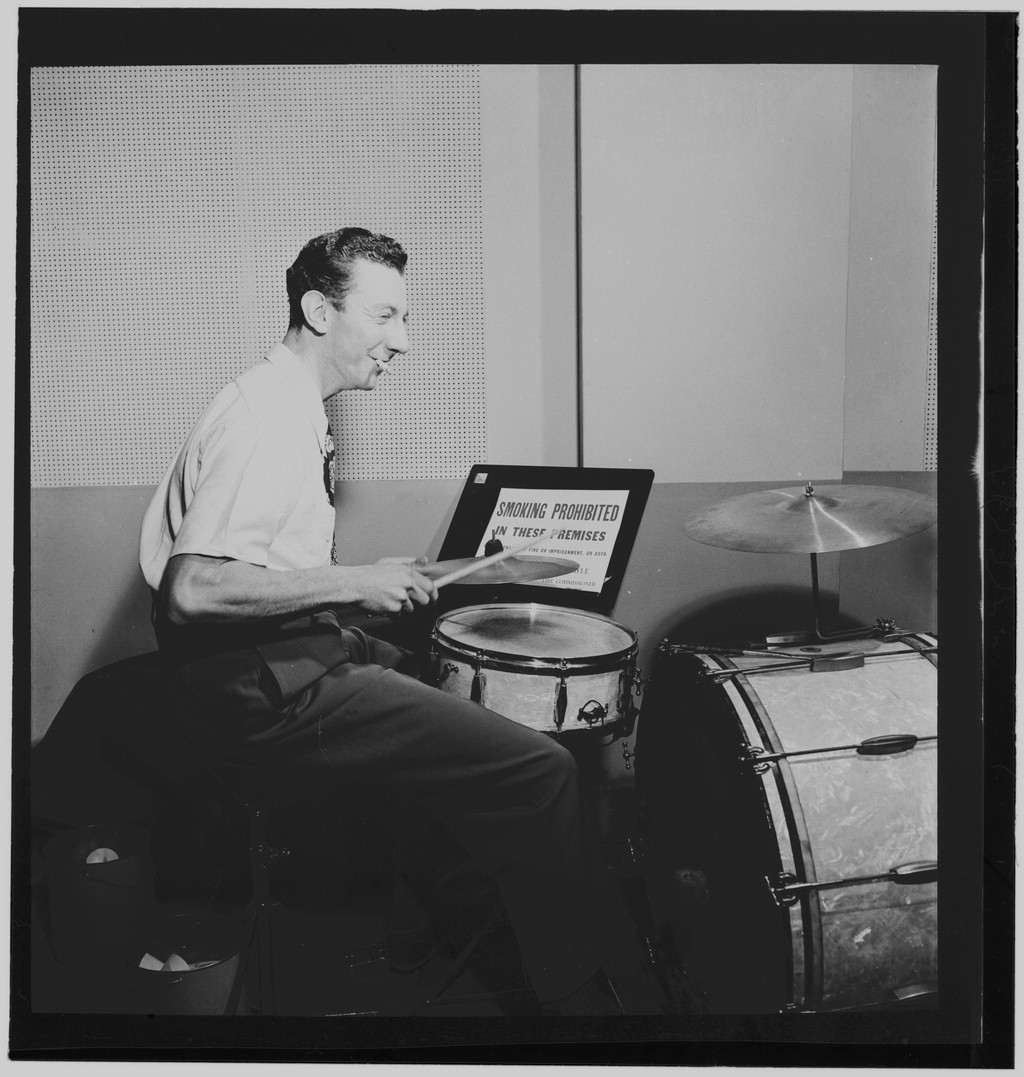
- Morey Feld, August 1947; Photograph by William P. Gottlieb

Background information
- Born: August 15, 1915; Cleveland, Ohio
- Died: March 28, 1971 (aged 56); Denver, Colorado
- Genres: Jazz
- Occupation: Musician
- Instrument: Drums
- Years active: 1930s–1960s
- Formerly of: Ben Pollack, Benny Goodman, Eddie Condon, Bobby Hackett, Billy Butterfield

Morey Feld (August 15, 1915 – March 28, 1971) was an American jazz drummer who was in bands led by Ben Pollack (1936), Benny Goodman (1943–1945), Eddie Condon (1946), Bobby Hackett, and Billy Butterfield. In 1960 Feld moved to Denver, Colorado]and worked with Peanuts Hucko's quintet.

Feld died at age 55 while attempting to fight a fire at his Denver home.

== Discography ==
=== As leader ===
- Jazz Goes to B' Way (Kapp, 1955)

=== As sideman ===
- Ella Fitzgerald, The First Lady of Song (Decca, 1958)
- Benny Goodman, Fletcher Henderson Arrangement (Columbia, 1953)
- Benny Goodman, Goodman On the Air (Nostalgia, 1979)
- Bobby Hackett, Creole Cookin (Verve, 1967)
- Bill Harris, Bill Harris Herd (Norgran, 1956)
- Rosa Rio, Plays Hits from My Fair Lady and Gigi (Vox, 1959)
- Johnny Smith, Stan Getz, The Johnny Smith Stan Getz Years (Roulette, 1978)
- Alec Templeton, Smart Alec (ABC-Paramount, 1956)
- World's Greatest Jazz Band, World's Greatest Jazz Band of Yank Lawson and Bob Haggart (Project 3, 1969)
- World's Greatest Jazz Band, Love is Blue (Project 3, 1969)
