= Eddie Hubble =

American musician (1928–2016)

John Edgar Hubble II (April 6, 1928 – March 22, 2016) was an American jazz trombonist.

Hubble was born in Santa Barbara, California, and learned trombone from his father, who was also a professional trombonist in the Los Angeles area. Hubble moved to New York City in 1944, and by the late 1940s had played with Bob Wilber, Buddy Rich, Doc Evans, Alvino Rey, and Eddie Condon. He played with his own ensemble from the late 1940s, recording for Savoy Records in 1952. He played with a Dixieland jazz ensemble known as The Six in 1953, and worked with Muggsy Spanier in the 1960s, playing in Ohio and Connecticut. He also worked with the World's Greatest Jazz Band. Despite being seriously injured in a car crash in 1979, he was soon back playing, including for international tours. Hubble died on March 22, 2016, at the age of 91.
