= Porter Steele =

American lawyer and musician (1880–1966)

Porter Steele (December 12, 1880–December 20, 1966) was an American lawyer and musician, known as the composer of the march and later jazz standard "High Society".

He was born in Natchez, Mississippi, the son of Hiram Roswell Steele (1842–1929), who was Attorney General of Louisiana (1875-77) before moving to Natchez and then Brooklyn where he continued to practice as a lawyer. Porter Steele studied law at Yale University, graduating in 1902. While there, he composed the march "High Society", which he copyrighted in 1901 and which was first recorded in 1905. Over time, the composition became a standard, recorded by both military bands and jazz bands, including those of Alphonse Picou, Charles A. Prince, and King Oliver. Steele's other compositions include "The Lobster's Promenade".

Porter Steele graduated from Columbia Law School, and practiced law in New York City until he retired in the 1930s. After his death in South Plainfield, New Jersey, in 1966 at the age of 86, his newspaper obituary stated that "he had done a considerable amount of composing both before and after his college days", and that after his retirement he devoted his time to "his avocations of music, farming and other activities".
