= High Society (composition) =

"High Society" is a multistrain melody, originally a march copyrighted in April 1901 by Porter Steele, which has become a traditional jazz standard.

The piccolo obbligato is not found in Steele's first version of the song; it appears to have originated in an orchestration by Robert Recker from later in 1901. In New Orleans, Louisiana, Alphonse Picou adapted the piccolo part into a clarinet variation, sometimes considered one of the earliest documented jazz solos. The Picou variations became standard in New Orleans jazz (unusual in a form that values improvisation); many traditional jazz clarinetists from the generation just after Picou until today have copied or closely paraphrased Picou's solo, sometimes followed by their own improvisations on a second chorus. Picou himself recorded it a number of times in his later life, including recordings with Kid Rena and Papa Celestin and for films. The first couple of bars were frequently quoted by Charlie Parker in his improvisations.

The tune was recorded as a march by Charles A. Prince's band in 1911. The first jazz recording of it was made by King Oliver's Creole Jazz Band in 1923, with Johnny Dodds on clarinet. Apparently unaware that the tune was already copyrighted, Gennett Records filed a copyright on the tune as a Joe Oliver original.

In the 1920s Walter Melrose added lyrics to it (which are never performed) and republished it, as he did to several jazz compositions in order to claim a larger share of the royalties.

An arrangement of the song was done in 1931 by Walter Melrose and Fud Livingston for Frank Trumbauer, Benny Goodman, and Louis Armstrong. This version will enter the American public domain on January 1, 2027.

== See also ==
- List of pre-1920 jazz standards
