= Peanuts Hucko =

American big band clarinetist and saxophonist (1918–2003)

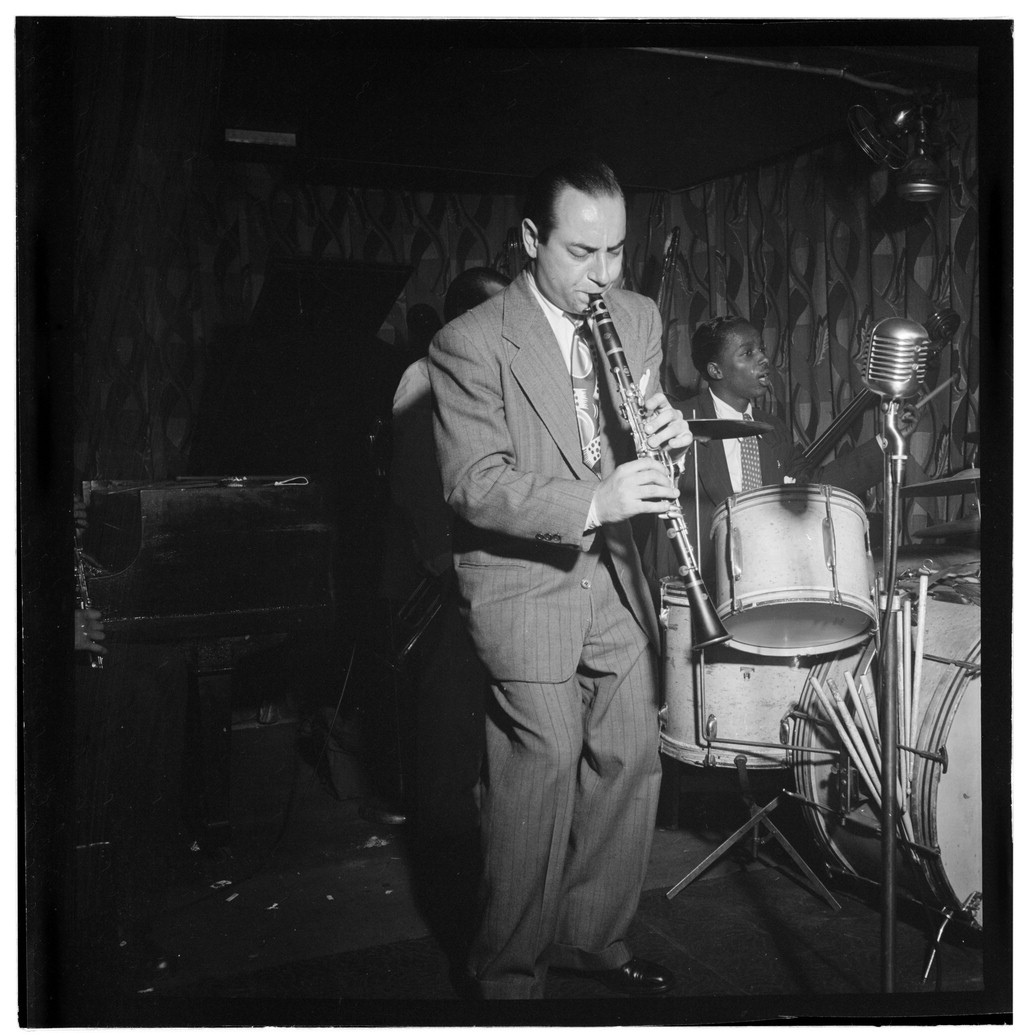
- Peanuts Hucko, Famous Door, New York

Background information
- Born: Michael Andrew Hucko; April 7, 1918; Syracuse, New York, U.S.
- Died: June 19, 2003 (aged 85)
- Genres: Jazz, dixieland, swing
- Occupations: Musician, bandleader
- Instrument: Clarinet
- Years active: 1940s – 1990s
- Formerly of: Lawson-Haggart Jazz Band, Benny Goodman, Eddie Condon, Glenn Miller, Louis Armstrong, Ray McKinley

Michael Andrew "Peanuts" Hucko (April 7, 1918 – June 19, 2003) was an American big band musician. His primary instrument was the clarinet, but he sometimes played saxophone.

== Early life and education ==
Michael Andrew Hucko was born on April 7, 1918 in Syracuse, New York, United States, and moved to New York City in 1939; he played tenor saxophone with Will Bradley, Tommy Reynolds, and Joe Marsala until 1940. After a brief time with Charlie Spivak, he joined the Glenn Miller Army Air Force Band which he served in Europe during World War II. During this time, Peanuts (the nickname comes from a childhood love of the food) began to concentrate on the clarinet "because we did a lot of marching in sand, which was awkward with the tenor." He was featured in Miller's hard-driving versions of "Stealin' Apples" and "Mission to Moscow".

== Post-war period ==
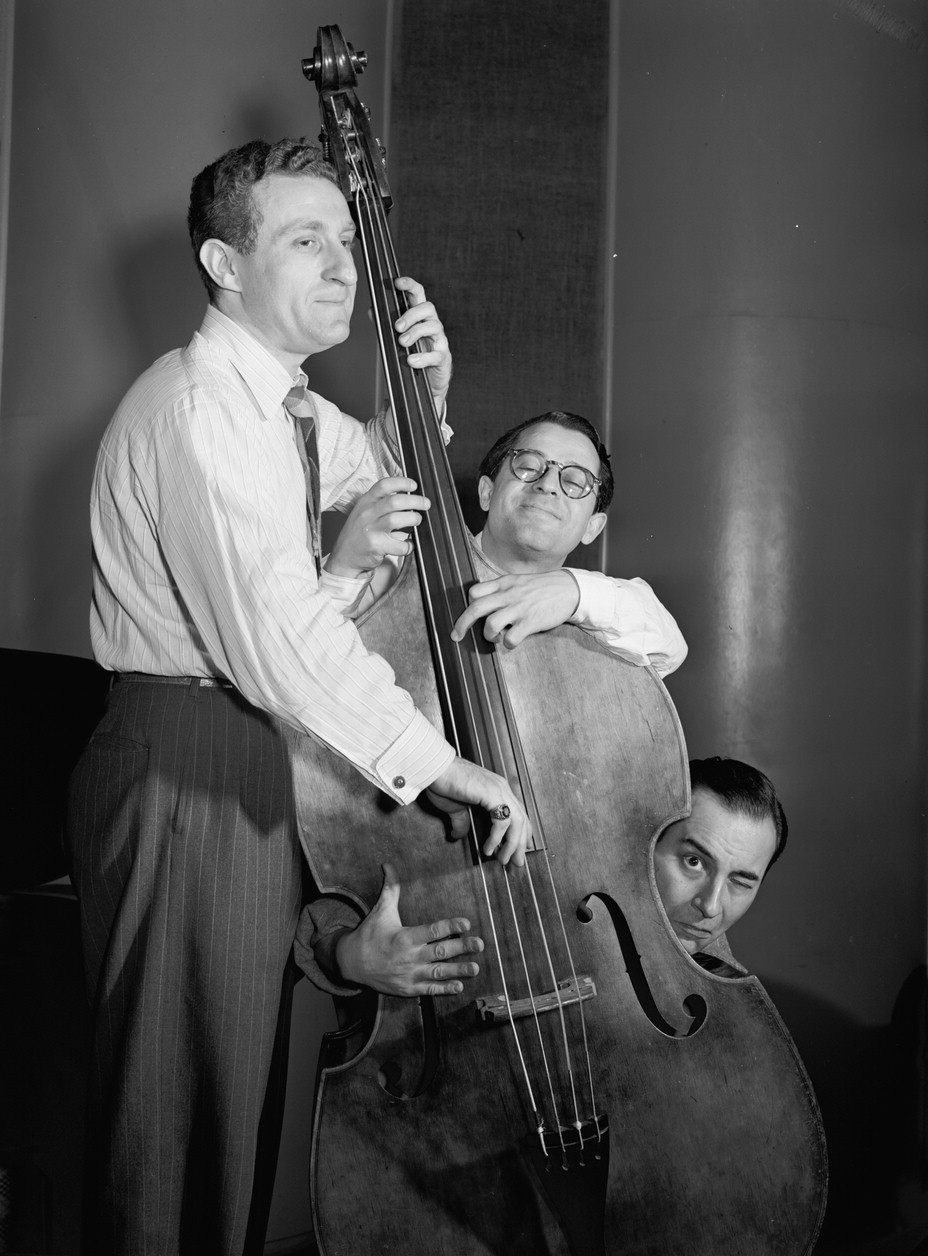
Jack Lesberg, Max Kaminsky, and Peanuts Hucko, photo by William Gottlieb

During the post-war period, Hucko played in the bands of Benny Goodman, Ray McKinley, Eddie Condon and Jack Teagarden. From 1950 to 1955, he was busy in New York as a studio musician for CBS and ABC. This was followed by more work with Goodman and Teagarden, after which he joined the Louis Armstrong All-Stars from 1958 to 1960. When he visited Tokyo, Japan, as the lead alto saxophone player of Benny Goodman's Orchestra in January, 1951, he listened to clarinetist Shoji Suzuki and his Rhythm Aces. With Suzuki and his band, they recorded the song "Suzukake No Michi", which broke sales records in Japan.

Hucko led his own group at Eddie Condon's Club from 1964 to 1966. He became known for his work with Frank Sinatra as the clarinet soloist on Cole Porter's "What Is This Thing Called Love?", which was featured on Sinatra's album In the Wee Small Hours (1955). In 1964, he opened his own nightclub in Denver, Peanuts Hucko's Navarre, featuring his singer wife Louise Tobin (formerly Mrs. Harry James) and Ralph Sutton. From 1966, he was featured regularly at Dick Gibson's Colorado jazz parties where he appeared with the Ten Greats of Jazz, later called the World's Greatest Jazz Band.

In the 1970s, he led the Glenn Miller Orchestra and toured with them across the U.S. and abroad. During this period he toured the U.K. as guest soloist with the Million Airs Orchestra, appearing with them in recreations of the Glenn Miller AEF Orchestra concerts and broadcasts. Hucko is perhaps best known to the public for his appearances with the Lawrence Welk Orchestra on national TV during the early 1970s.

In the 1980s, Hucko had a busy concert and touring schedule as a soloist and with his award-winning Pied Piper quintet. He and Tobin later settled into semi-retirement in Denton, Texas. His last recording was Swing That Music in 1992 featuring Tobin, trumpeter Randy Sandke, and pianist Johnny Varro.

He died in 2003 in Fort Worth, Texas at the age of 85.

== Compositions ==
Peanuts Hucko wrote, or co-wrote, the following songs: "See You Again", "A Bientot", "Peanut Butter", which appeared on V-Disc 812B, "Blintzes Bagel Boogie", which appeared on V-Disc 825A, "Falling Tears", "First Friday", "Tremont Place", and "Sweet Home Suite".

== Discography ==
=== As leader ===
- Peanuts Hucko (Epic, 1954)
- Stealin' Apples (Zodiac, 1983)
- Swing That Music (Star Line, 1992)

=== As sideman ===
With Louis Armstrong

- At Newport (Columbia, 1956)
- Town Hall (RCA Victor, 1957)
- Satchmo Plays King Oliver (Audio Fidelity, 1960)

With Eddie Condon

- Jammin' at Condon's (Columbia, 1955)
- Midnight in Moscow (Epic, 1956)
- Dixieland Dance Party (London, 1958)

With others

- Will Bradley & Ray McKinley, Hi-Fi Dixie (Jazztone, 1957)
- Ruth Brown, Ruth Brown (Atlantic, 1957)
- Billy Butterfield, Thank You for a Lovely Evening (RCA Victor, 1958)
- Lee Castle, Dixieland Heaven (Davis, 1957)
- Al Cohn, The Sax Section (Epic, 1956)
- Chris Connor, Chris Connor Sings the George Gershwin Almanac of Song (Atlantic, 1957)
- Warren Covington, Golden Trombones Favorites (Decca, 1966)
- Morey Feld, Jazz Goes to B'Way (Kapp, 1955)
- Bud Freeman, Midnight at Eddie Condon's (Emarcy, 1955)
- Lawson-Haggart Jazz Band, Ragtime Jamboree (Decca, 1954)
- Lawson-Haggart Jazz Band, Windy City (Decca, 1958)
- Lou McGarity, Lou McGarity: In Celebration (IAJRC, 1981)
- Ray McKinley, Borderline (Savoy, 1955)
- Jimmy McPartland, Dixieland! (Harmony, 1968)
- Mel Powell, Out On a Limb (Vanguard, 1955)
- Lou Stein, The Lou Stein Three, Four and Five (Epic, 1955)
- Lou Stein, Eight for Kicks Four for Laughs (Jubilee, 1956)
- Jack Teagarden, Jack Teagarden (RCA Victor, 1966)
- Helen Ward, With a Little Bit of Swing (RCA Victor, 1958)
- Alex Welsh, Peanuts Hucko Vol. 1 (Lake, 2002)
- Lee Wiley, West of the Moon (RCA Victor, 1957)
