= Cutty Cutshall =

American jazz musician

Robert Dewees "Cutty" Cutshall (December 29, 1911 – August 16, 1968) was an American jazz trombonist.

Cutshall was born in Huntington Co., Pennsylvania, on December 29, 1911. He played in Pittsburgh early in his career, making his first major tour in 1934 with Charley Dornberger. He joined Jan Savitt's orchestra in 1938, then played with Benny Goodman in the early 1940s. Later in the decade he worked frequently with Billy Butterfield and did some freelance work in New York City. He started working with Eddie Condon in 1949, an association which lasted over a decade. Cutshall was touring with Condon in Toronto when the trombonist died of a heart attack in his hotel room on August 16, 1968.

Cutshall's credits include work with Peanuts Hucko, Bob Crosby, Ella Fitzgerald, and Louis Armstrong.

== Discography ==
With Eddie Condon

- That Toddlin' Town (Warner Bros., 1959)

With Bobby Hackett

- Creole Cookin' (Verve, 1967)
