= Lou McGarity =

- Born: Robert Louis McGarity; July 22, 1917; Athens, Georgia, U.S.
- Died: August 28, 1971 (aged 54) Alexandria, Virginia, U.S.
- Genres: Jazz, Swing, Dixieland
- Occupation: Musician
- Instrument: Trombone
- Years active: Early 1930s–1971
- Labels: MGM, Jubilee, Argo

Robert Louis McGarity (July 22, 1917 – August 28, 1971) was an American jazz trombonist who was a member of the Benny Goodman big band during the late 1930s and early 1940s. After serving in the military, he was a studio musician in New York City who performed in clubs at night with Eddie Condon and the Lawson/Haggart band. He was member of the World's Greatest Jazz Band at the end of the 1960s.

== Discography ==
=== As leader ===
- Music from Some Like it Hot (Jubille, 1957)
- Blue Lou (Argo, 1960)

=== As sideman ===
With Kenny Davern

- A Night with Eddie Condon (Arbors)

With Benny Goodman

- Peggy Lee & Benny Goodman: The Complete Recordings (Columbia)

With Urbie Green

- All About Urbie Green and His Big Band (ABC-Paramount, 1956)

With Bobby Hackett

- Creole Cookin' (Verve, 1967)

With J. J. Johnson

- J.J.'s Broadway (Verve, 1963)

With Jimmy McPartland

- The Music Man Goes Dixieland (Epic)

With Charlie Parker

- Big Band (Clef, 1954)

With the World's Greatest Jazz Band

- The World's Greatest Jazz Band Volume II (Douglass)

With Cootie Williams

- Cootie Williams in Hi-Fi (RCA Victor, 1958)
