= Bob Haggart =

American bassist, composer, and arranger (1914–1998)

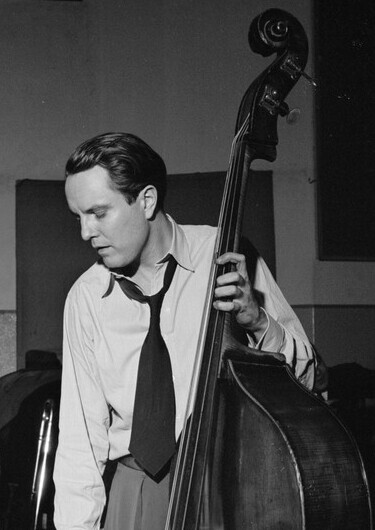
- Haggart performing in 1947

Background information
- Born: Robert Sherwood Haggart; March 13, 1914; New York City, US
- Died: December 2, 1998 (aged 84) Venice, Florida, US
- Genres: Jazz, Dixieland
- Occupations: Musician, composer, arranger
- Instrument: Double bass
- Years active: 1930s–1998
- Label: Command
- Formerly of: Lawson-Haggart Jazz Band, World's Greatest Jazz Band

Robert Sherwood Haggart (March 13, 1914 – December 2, 1998) was an American double bass player, composer, and arranger. He played Dixieland jazz.

== Biography ==
Haggart was born on March 13, 1914, in New York City. raised in Douglaston, New York in Queens, New York.

In 1935, Haggart became a member of the Bob Crosby Band. He arranged, composed, and played "Big Noise from Winnetka", "My Inspiration", "What's New?", and "South Rampart Street Parade". Along with playing double bass, he whistled on Big Noise from Winnetka. He remained with the band until it dissolved in 1942, then began working as session musician, with much of his time spent at Decca Records.

Haggart recorded with Bing Crosby, Billie Holiday, Duke Ellington, Benny Goodman, and Ella Fitzgerald; his arrangements can be heard on Fitzgerald's album Lullabies of Birdland. Haggart also starred in several commercials for L&M cigarettes on the radio program "Gunsmoke", including the March 4, 1956 episode "The Hunter".

Haggart and Yank Lawson formed the Lawson-Haggart Band, and also led the World's Greatest Jazz Band from 1968 until 1978. He appeared at jazz festivals until his death on December 2, 1998, in Venice, Florida.

Haggart died on December 2, 1998, aged 84, in Venice, Florida.

== Discography ==
- Strictly from Dixie (MGM, 1960)
- Big Noise from Winnetka (Command, 1962)
- Live at the Roosevelt Grill (Atlantic, 1970)
- What's New? (Atlantic, 1971)
- Makes a Sentimental Journey (Jazzology, 1980)
- Enjoys Carolina in the Morning (Jazzology, 1981)
- A Portrait of Bix (Jazzology, 1986)
- Enjoy Yourself! (Audiophile, 1986) with Maxine Sullivan, Ike Isaacs featuring Dardanelle, Sil Austin, Dan Wall
- Hag Leaps In (Arbors, 1995)
- The All-Stars at Bob Haggart's 80th Birthday Party (Arbors, 2002)
- The Piano Giants at Bob Haggart's 80th Birthday Party (Arbors, 2002)
- The Music of Bob Haggart (Arbors, 2002)
