= Yank Lawson =

American jazz trumpeter

- Birth name: John Rhea Lawson
- Born: May 3, 1911; Trenton, Missouri, U.S.
- Died: February 18, 1995; Indianapolis, Indiana
- Genres: Jazz, dixieland, swing
- Occupation: Musician
- Instrument: Trumpet
- Years active: 1930s–1990s
- Labels: Atlantic, Audiophile, Decca, Jazzology
- Formerly of: Ben Pollack, Bob Crosby, Bob Haggart, World's Greatest Jazz Band

John Rhea "Yank" Lawson (May 3, 1911 – February 18, 1995) was an American jazz trumpeter known for Dixieland and swing music.

Born John Lausen in 1911, from 1933 to 1935 he worked in Ben Pollack's orchestra and after that became a founding member of the Bob Crosby Orchestra. He later worked with Benny Goodman and Tommy Dorsey, but also worked with Crosby again in 1941–42. Later in the 1940s he became a studio musician leading his own Dixieland sessions.

In the 1950s he and Bob Haggart created the Lawson-Haggart band and they worked together in 1968 to form the World's Greatest Jazz Band, a Dixieland group which performed for the next ten years.
