= Trigger Alpert =

American jazz bassist (1916–2013)

- Alpert in 1941

Background information
- Born: Herman Alpert; September 3, 1916; Indianapolis, Indiana, U.S.
- Died: December 21, 2013 (aged 97) Jacksonville Beach, Florida, U.S.
- Genres: Jazz
- Occupation: Musician
- Instrument: Double bass
- Years active: 1930s–1970
- Formerly of: The Glenn Miller Orchestra

Herman "Trigger" Alpert (September 3, 1916 – December 21, 2013) was an American jazz bassist from Indianapolis, Indiana.

== Music career ==
A native of Indianapolis, Alpert attended Indiana University, where he studied music. Soon after, he played with guitarist Alvino Rey in New York City, then toured with the Glenn Miller band in the early 1940s. Alpert's only album as a leader was Trigger Happy (Riverside, 1956), which he recorded with Al Cohn, Urbie Green, Tony Scott, Ed Shaughnessy, Zoot Sims, and Joe Wilder.

In 1970 he became a professional photographer. He died on December 21, 2013, at an assisted living facility in Jacksonville Beach, Florida.

== Discography ==
=== As leader ===
- Trigger Happy! (Riverside, 1956)

=== As sideman ===
With Coleman Hawkins

- The Hawk Talks (Decca, 1952–53 [1955])

With Mundell Lowe

- The Mundell Lowe Quartet (Riverside, 1955)
- Guitar Moods (Riverside, 1956)
- New Music of Alec Wilder (Riverside, 1956)

With Glenn Miller

- 1987 Major Glenn Miller & the Army Air Force Band (1943–1944)
- 1992 Moon Dreams
- 1995 In True Stereo
- 1996 1935–1942
- 1996 We're Still in Love

With Ella Fitzgerald

- 1993 75th Birthday Celebration
- 1994 The War Years
- 2003 How High the Moon
- 2011 The Complete Masters 1935–55
- 2004 Ella and Satchmo

With Buddy Rich

- 1988 Gene Krupa & Buddy Rich
- 1991 Buddy Rich & His Legendary '47–'48 Orchestra
- 2008 Quiet Riot

With others

- 1955 Swingin' 30s Ray McKinley
- 1999 1945–1947, Roy Eldridge
- 1992 Doc Severinsen and Friends, Doc Severinsen
- 1998 1944–1946, Muggsy Spanier
- 1998 Swingin' with the Eel, Bud Freeman
- 1999 1946–1947, Johnny Guarnieri
- 1999 East Coast Sounds, Zoot Sims
- 2001 1927–1946: His Best Recordings, Frankie Trumbauer
- 2003 1944–1952, Budd Johnson
- 2003 1947–1950, Pearl Bailey
- 2003 Jazz!!!, Frank Sinatra
- 2003 Piano Prodigy, Mel Powell
- 2004 By Arrangement, Billy May
- 2006 1951–1954, Artie Shaw
- 2007 Always, Ralph Flanagan
