= Satan in High Heels =

1962 American film by Jerald Intrator

- Theatrical release poster
- Directed by: Jerald Intrator
- Written by: Harold Bonnett (story); John T. Chapman
- Produced by: Leonard M. Burton
- Starring: Meg Myles; Grayson Hall; Del Tenney
- Cinematography: Bernard Hirschenson
- Edited by: Armond Lebowitz
- Music by: Mundell Lowe
- Distributed by: Cosmic Films Inc.
- Release date: March 23, 1962
- Running time: 89 minutes
- Country: United States
- Language: English

Satan in High Heels is a 1962 American sexploitation film directed by Jerald Intrator and starring Meg Myles and Grayson Hall. The screenplay was by John Chapman from a story by Harold Bonnett and Chapman.

== Plot ==
Stacey Kane, a cunning and ambitious striptease dancer in a cheap carnival, tricks her heroin-addicted husband out of his money and leaves him, clothed only in a corset and raincoat. On a plane to New York, she meets a well-heeled businessman, Louie, who falls for her charms and sets her up in a hotel. He arranges an audition for her at a Manhattan midtown club run by an elegant, world-weary lesbian named Pepe.

Stacey wows them with her vocal ability and begins being groomed as a leading chanteuse at the night club. Arnold Kenyon, the club's owner, falls in love with Stacey and makes her his mistress, unaware that while he is lavishing her with expensive gifts and grooming her for a singing debut at his club, she is also having an affair with his playboy son, Laurence.

On her opening night, Stacey's estranged husband, Rudy, arrives at the club. Using both emotional and sexual appeal, Stacey persuades him to kill Arnold; but Rudy bungles the murder attempt and confesses his intention to Arnold. Her double-dealing nature out in the open, Stacey is abandoned by all the men in her life, put out of her apartment, and left alone on the streets.

== Cast ==
- Meg Myles as Stacey
- Grayson Hall as Pepe
- Del Tenney as Paul
- Sabrina as herself
- Mike Keane as Arnold Kenyon
- Robert Yuro as Laurence Kenyon

== Production notes ==
The film used Manhattan locations Club Le Martinique at 57 West 57th Street and Sutton Place neighborhood for the apartments where Pepe and the Kenyons live.

Producer Leonard Burtman was a major New York publisher of dozens of fetish magazines such as the pioneering Exotique, Bizarre Life, High Heels, Unique World, and Corporal. In 1962, a few of his publications ran photo-features promoting this film.

== Soundtrack ==
Satan in High Heels

Soundtrack album by Mundell Lowe and His Orchestra
- Released: 1962
- Recorded: November 30 and December 22, 1961; New York City
- Genre: Film score
- Label: Charlie Parker; PLP-406
- Producer: Aubrey Mayhew

Mundell Lowe chronology
Themes from Mr. Lucky, the Untouchables and Other TV Action Jazz (1960)	Satan in High Heels (1962)	Billy Jack (1971)

The film score was composed, arranged and conducted by Mundell Lowe and the soundtrack album was originally released on the Charlie Parker label. The soundtrack was also released as Blues for a Stripper.

=== Reception ===
Professional ratings
Review scores
Source	Rating
Down Beat	4/5 stars
Allmusic	3/5 stars

In his review for the June 6, 1963, issue of DownBeat magazine, jazz critic John S. Wilson wrote: "Guitarist Lowe has put together a walloping big band, given it some strong punchy arrangements to play, and has come through with a set of rousing performances."

The Allmusic review states "Mundell Lowe's score for the exploitation flick Satan in High Heels is an immensely enjoyable collection of exaggeratedly cinematic jazz. Lowe runs through all sorts of styles, from swinging big band to cool jazz, from laid-back hard-bop to driving bop".

=== Track listing ===
All compositions by Mundell Lowe.

1. "Satan in High Heels" – 3:24
2. "Montage" – 2:11
3. "The Lost and the Lonely" – 3:38
4. "East Side Drive" – 2:48
5. "Coffee, Coffee" – 3:27
6. "Lake in the Woods" – 3:30
7. "From Mundy On" – 3:27
8. "The Long Knife" – 2:22
9. "Blues for a Stripper" – 3:27
10. "Pattern of Evil" – 2:26
- Recorded in New York City on November 30 (tracks 2, 3, 6 & 10) and December 23 (tracks 1, 4, 5 & 7–9), 1961

=== Personnel ===
- Mundell Lowe – guitar, arranger, conductor
- Bernie Glow (tracks 1, 4, 5 & 7–9), Joe Newman (tracks 2, 3, 6 & 10), Ernie Royal (tracks 1, 4, 5 & 7–9), Doc Severinsen, Clark Terry – trumpet
- Jimmy Cleveland (tracks 1, 4, 5 & 7–9), Buster Cooper, Urbie Green (tracks 2, 3, 6 & 10) – trombone
- Jim Buffington – French horn (tracks 2, 3, 6 & 10)
- Ray Beckenstein – alto saxophone, flute (tracks 2, 3, 6 & 10)
- Walter Levinsky – alto saxophone, clarinet
- Phil Woods – alto saxophone (tracks 1, 4, 5 & 7–9)
- Al Cohn, Al Klink (tracks 2, 3, 6 & 10), Oliver Nelson (tracks 1, 4, 5 & 7–9) – tenor saxophone
- Gene Allen (tracks 1, 4, 5 & 7–9), Sol Schlinger (tracks 2, 3, 6 & 10) – baritone saxophone
- Eddie Costa – piano, vibraphone
- Barry Galbraith – guitar (tracks 1, 4, 5 & 7–9)
- George Duvivier – bass
- Ed Shaughnessy – drums

== Reception ==
The New York Times wrote: "Nobody is likely to be corrupted by Satan in High Heels. Yesterday's new film entry at the Forum demonstrates once again that vice can be dull. From the first glimpse of Meg Myles as a bumptious carnival entertainer wearing tights to bate the breaths of ogling males, it is clear that she is up to no good. ... If this sort of gutter drama were to be made effective, the title role would require, at the very least, a Brigitte Bardot. Miss Myles, alas, is not the type. Singing a couple of songs with sophisticated professionalism, she seems indisputably feminine but insufficiently fatale. Since this deprives the chronicle of its point, the filmmakers' objective emerges as nothing more than slick sensationalism. Inadequately motivated along their road to ruin, the males in the cast, Mike Keene, Bob Yuro and Earl Hammond, are blasé about the whole thing, but Jerald Intrator's emphatic direction dots every 'i' in the script."

Boxoffice wrote: "A cheaply made exploitation picture, featuring two sensationally busty personalities, the nightclub singer Meg Myles and Britain's Sabrina, whose only claim to fame is her well-publicized measurements, this will attract the curious, mostly males, to downtown theatres in key cities. A nude bathing sequence is another attention-getter. Because it deals with hustlers, jailbirds and similar unsavory characters, the picture was denied a Production Code seal and, naturally, it's strictly adult fare and has no place in family, neighborhood or small town spots. Filmed entirely in actual New York City locations, the photography is often dark and the sound is below-par to the extent that much of the dialog is inaudible – not that this matters much. Produced by Leonard Burton, the screenplay by John T. Chapman from his original with Harold Bonnet, is typical True Confessions stuff which might have been more interesting if better directed (by Jerald Intrator) or acted.... Inexpensively made film – and it looks it!"

== Home media ==
The film was released on Region 1 DVD by Something Weird Video in 2002.
