= Dirty Dan =

"Dirty Dan" may refer to:

- Dirty Dan Harris (c. 1833–1890), settler and founder of the town of Fairhaven, Washington, United States
- Danny McBride (musician) (1945–2009), American singer-songwriter and guitarist
- "Dirty" Dan Collins, a ring name of Danny Boy Collins (born 1967), English professional wrestler
- "Dirty" Dan Denton, a ring name of a NWA All-Star Wrestling professional wrestler
- Dirty Dan, a recurring character in Sheriff Callie's Wild West, an American animated children's television series
- Dirty Dan, an alternate title of Night of the Strangler, a 1972 American film
- "Dirty Dan", a track from the 1955 album Blues and Other Shades of Green by Urbie Green
- Dirty Dan, one of eight tops in Battling Tops, a children's game
- Dirty Dan, a fictional character referenced in the SpongeBob SquarePants Season 2 episode Survival of the Idiots

== See also ==
- Dirty Den, a fictional character from the BBC soap opera EastEnders
