= The Tonight Show Band with Doc Severinsen =

Studio album by Doc Severinsen
- Released: 1986
- Recorded: August 5–7, 1986
- Genre: Jazz, big band, swing
- Length: 42:10
- Label: Amherst
- Producer: Jeff Tyzik, Allen Vizzutti

Doc Severinsen chronology
Seductive Strings Featuring Doc Severinsen (1980)	The Tonight Show Band with Doc Severinsen (1986)	Episodes (1986)

The Tonight Show Band with Doc Severinsen is an album that won the Grammy Award for Best Large Jazz Ensemble Performance in 1986. The album consists of big band songs arranged by Tommy Newsom, Bill Holman, and Dick Lieb performed by members of the band from The Tonight Show with Johnny Carson. The band is conducted by trumpeter Doc Severinsen.

== Track listing ==
No.	Title	Writer(s)	Length
1.	"Begin the Beguine"	Cole Porter	3:51
2.	"King Porter Stomp"	Jelly Roll Morton	3:26
3.	"How Long Has This Been Going On?"	George Gershwin, Ira Gershwin	4:12
4.	"One O'Clock Jump"	Count Basie, Eddie Durham	2:54
5.	"Tippin' In"	Bobby Smith, Marty Symes	2:48
6.	"Shawnee"	Mike Barone	3:02
7.	"Johnny's Theme (The Tonight Show Theme)"	Paul Anka, Johnny Carson	1:21
8.	"Skyliner"	Charlie Barnet	3:47
9.	"Flying Home"	Benny Goodman, Lionel Hampton, Sid Robin	3:50
10.	"Bye Bye Blues"	David Bennett, Chauncey Gray, Frederick Hamm, Bert Lown	3:58
11.	"I'm Getting Sentimental Over You"	George Bassman, Ned Washington	3:12
12.	"Sax Alley"	John Bambridge	3:22
13.	"Don't Be That Way"	Benny Goodman, Mitchell Parish, Edgar Sampson	4:02

== Personnel ==
Credits adapted from AllMusic.

- Doc Severinsen – conductor, flugelhorn, trumpet
- Tommy Newsom – clarinet, flute, alto saxophone, arranger
- John Bambridge – clarinet, flute, alto saxophone, arranger
- Bill Perkins – clarinet, flute, alto saxophone
- Ernie Watts – clarinet, flute, tenor saxophone
- Pete Christlieb – clarinet, flute, tenor saxophone
- Donald Ashworth – clarinet, flute, baritone saxophone, bass saxophone, euphonium
- John Audino – flugelhorn, trumpet
- Conte Candoli – flugelhorn, trumpet
- Maurice Harris – flugelhorn, trumpet
- Snooky Young – flugelhorn, trumpet
- Allen Vizzutti – flugelhorn, trumpet, producer
- Gilbert Falco – trombone
- Bruce Paulson – trombone
- Ernie Tack – bass trombone
- Ross Tompkins – piano
- Joel DiBartolo – bass
- Bob Bain – guitar
- Peter Woodford – guitar
- Ed Shaughnessy – drums

Production

- Jeff Tyzik – producer
- Bernie Grundman – mastering
- Mick Guzauski – engineer, mixing
- Daren Klein – assistant engineer
- Richard McKernan – assistant engineer
- Jesse Peck – assistant engineer
