= Tyzik =

Tyzik (/ˈtaɪzɪk/ TYE-zik) is a surname. Notable people with the surname include:

- Jeff Tyzik, American composer, arranger, and trumpeter
- Mr. Tyzik, a character from The Kids in the Hall
