= Urbie Green =

American jazz trombonist (1926–2018)

- Born: Urban Clifford Green; August 8, 1926; Mobile, Alabama, U.S.
- Died: December 31, 2018 (aged 92) Hellertown, Pennsylvania, U.S.
- Genres: Jazz
- Occupation: Musician
- Instrument: Trombone
- Labels: Vanguard; Bethlehem; CTI; ABC-Paramount Records; Command; RCA
- Formerly of: Woody Herman, Gene Krupa, Jan Savitt, Frankie Carle

Urban Clifford "Urbie" Green (August 8, 1926 – December 31, 2018) was an American jazz trombonist who toured with Woody Herman, Gene Krupa, Jan Savitt, and Frankie Carle. He played on over 250 recordings and released more than twenty albums as a soloist. He was inducted into the Alabama Jazz Hall of Fame in 1995.

== Early years ==
Green was born in Mobile, Alabama. He was taught the piano as a child by his mother. He learned jazz and popular tunes from the beginning. He started to play trombone, which both older brothers played, when he was about 12. He listened to trombonists Tommy Dorsey, J. C. Higginbotham, Jack Jenney, Jack Teagarden, and Trummy Young, but said he was more influenced by the styles of Dizzy Gillespie, Charlie Parker, and Lester Young. His style was also influenced by the vocals of Perry Como and Louis Armstrong. He attended Auburn High School, where he was a member of The Auburn Knights Orchestra.

== Career ==
When Green was fifteen years old, his father died, and he began his music career, first with Tommy Reynolds in California, then with Bob Strong, Jan Savitt, and Frankie Carle. In California, he finished high school at the Hollywood Professional School in Los Angeles. In 1947, he joined Gene Krupa's band. Three years later, he and his brother Jack became members of Woody Herman's Thundering Herd.

In 1953, he moved to New York City, and a year later was voted New Star trombonist in the International Critics Poll of Down Beat magazine. During the 1950s and 1960s he toured with Benny Goodman, and led the Tommy Dorsey orchestra after Dorsey's death in 1956. He worked with record producer Enoch Light on the albums The Persuasive Trombone of Urbie Green and 21 Trombones. Green spent his later life with his second wife Kathy, a jazz singer, at their home in the Pocono Mountains region of Northeastern Pennsylvania.

In 1995, Green was elected into the Alabama Jazz Hall of Fame. He continued playing live at the Delaware Water Gap Celebration of the Arts Festival every September into the last years of his life.

== Personal life ==
Green's obituary was published in the Pocono Record.

== Discography ==
=== As leader ===
- Urbie Green Septet (Modern Jazz Series, New Faces - New Sounds) (10") (Blue Note, 1953)
- A Cool Yuletide (10") (RCA/X, 1954)
- Urbie Green and His Band (10") (Vanguard, 1955)
- Urbie East Coast Jazz/6 (Bethlehem, 1955)
- Blues and Other Shades of Green (ABC-Paramount, 1955)
- All About Urbie Green and His Big Band (ABC-Paramount, 1956)
- Jimmy McHugh in Hi-Fi (RCA Victor, 1958)
- Let's Face the Music and Dance (RCA Victor, 1958)
- The Best of New Broadway Show Hits - Urbie Green, His Trombone and Rhythm (RCA Victor, 1959)
- The Persuasive Trombone of Urbie Green (Command, 1960)
- The Persuasive Trombone of Urbie Green Vol. 2 (Command, 1962)
- Urbie Green and His 6-Tet (Command, 1963)
- Twenty-One Trombones (Project 3, 1967)
- Twenty-One Trombones Vol. Two (Project 3, 1969)
- Green Power (Project 3, 1971)
- Bein' Green (Project 3, 1972)
- Urbie Green's Big Beautiful Band (Project 3, 1974)
- The Fox (CTI, 1977)
- Señor Blues (CTI, 1977)
- The Message (RCA 1986) (recorded 1959)
- Just Friends (Live at EJ's, 1996) (recorded 1981)
- Sea Jam Blues (Chiaroscuro, 1997) (recorded 1995)

=== As sideman ===
With Manny Albam

- The Drum Suite (RCA Victor, 1956)
- The Jazz Workshop (RCA Victor, 1956)
- The Blues Is Everybody's Business (Coral, 1958)
- Sophisticated Lady (Coral, 1958)
- Jazz Goes to the Movies (Impulse!, 1963)

With The Count Basie Orchestra

- This Time by Basie! (Reprise, 1963)
- Ella and Basie! (Verve, 1963)
- Basie Land (Verve, 1964)

With Tony Bennett

- My Heart Sings (Columbia, 1961)
- A Time, for Love (Columbia, 1966)
- The Very Thought of You (Columbia, 1966)
- Tony Makes It Happen! (Columbia, 1967)

With Buck Clayton

- The Huckle-Buck and Robbins' Nest (Columbia, 1954)
- How Hi the Fi (Columbia, 1954)
- Jumpin' at the Woodside (Columbia, 1955)
- Buck Clayton Jams Benny Goodman (Columbia, 1955)
- All the Cats Join In (Columbia, 1956)
- Swingin' Buck Clayton Jams (CBS, 1974)
- A Buck Clayton Jam Session (Chiaroscuro, 1974)

With Quincy Jones

- This Is How I Feel About Jazz (ABC-Paramount, 1957)
- The Great Wide World of Quincy Jones (Mercury, 1959)
- The Birth of a Band! (Mercury, 1959)
- Quincy Jones Explores the Music of Henry Mancini (Mercury, 1964)
- Quincy's Got a Brand New Bag (Mercury, 1965)

With Mundell Lowe

- Themes from Mr. Lucky, the Untouchables and Other TV Action Jazz (RCA Camden, 1960)
- Satan in High Heels (soundtrack) (Charlie Parker, 1961)
- Blues for a Stripper (Charlie Parker, 1962)

With Astrud Gilberto

- The Shadow of Your Smile (Verve, 1965)
- Beach Samba (Verve, 1967)
- That Girl from Ipanema (Image, 1977)

With Woody Herman

- At the Monterey Jazz Festival (Atlantic, 1960)
- Hey! Heard the Herd? (Verve, 1963)
- In Person Woody Herman and His '51 Herd Live in New Orleans (Giants of Jazz, 1979)
- The Third Herd (Discovery, 1982)

With Antonio Carlos Jobim

- Wave (A&M/CTI, 1967)
- Stone Flower (CTI, 1970)
- Jobim (MCA, 1973)

With J. J. Johnson & Kai Winding

- Jay & Kai + 6 (Columbia, 1956)
- Jay and Kai (Fontana, 1959)
- J.J.'s Broadway (Verve, 1963)

With Enoch Light

- Provocative Percussion Vol. 2 (Command, 1960)
- Big Band Bossa Nova (Command, 1962)
- My Musical Coloring Book (Command, 1963)
- Film Fame Marvelous Movie Themes (Project 3, 1967)
- Permissive Polyphonics (Project 3, 1970)
- The Big Band Sound of the Thirties (Project 3, 1970)
- Big Band Hits of the 30s & 40s (Project 3, 1971)
- Big Hits of the 20s (Project 3, 1971)
- Movie Hits! (Project 3, 1972)
- The Brass Menagerie 1973 (Project 3, 1972)
- The Big Band Hits of the 40s & 50s (Project 3, 1973)
- The Disco Disque (Project 3, 1975)

With Van McCoy

- Love Is the Answer (Avco, 1974)
- Rhythms of the World (H&L, 1976)
- The Real McCoy (H&L, 1976)
- And His Magnificent Movie Machine (H&L, 1977)
- My Favorite Fantasy (MCA, 1978)
- Lonely Dancer (MCA, 1979)

With Hugo Montenegro

- Ellington Fantasy (Vik, 1958)
- Bongos and Brass (Time, 1960)
- Arriba! (Time, 1960)
- Overture, American Musical Theatre (Time, 1961)
- Great Songs from Motion Pictures (Time, 1961)
- Boogie Woogie + Bongos (Time, 1962)
- The Great Hits of the 50's (Time, 1964)
- Montenegro & Mayhem (Time, 1965)
- Mira! (Mainstream, 1967)

With Jimmy Rushing

- The Jazz Odyssey of Jimmy Rushing (Philips, 1957)
- Little Jimmy Rushing and the Big Brass (Columbia, 1958)
- Five Feet of Soul (Colpix, 1963)

With others

- Steve Allen, Jazz for Tonight (Coral, 1955)
- Trigger Alpert, Trigger Happy! (Riverside, 1956)
- LaVern Baker, LaVern Baker Sings Bessie Smith (Atlantic, 1958)
- Sallie Blair, Squeeze Me (Bethlehem, 1957)
- Teresa Brewer, Teresa Brewer and the Dixieland Band (Coral, 1959)
- Ray Brown & Milt Jackson, Ray Brown / Milt Jackson (Verve, 1965)
- Ruth Brown, Ruth Brown '65 (Mainstream, 1965)
- Ruth Brown, Softly (Mainstream, 1972)
- Ray Bryant, Madison Time (Columbia, 1960)
- John Bunch, John's Bunch (Famous Door, 1975)
- Vinnie Burke, The Vinnie Burke All-Stars (ABC-Paramount, 1956)
- Ralph Burns, Where There's Burns There's Fire (Warwick, 1961)
- Ralph Burns, Very Warm for Jazz (MCA, 1975)
- Kenny Burrell, Blues - The Common Ground (Verve, 1968)
- Kenny Burrell, Night Song (Verve, 1969)
- Billy Butterfield, Thank You for a Lovely Evening (RCA Victor, 1958)
- Bobby Byrne, The Jazzbone's Connected to the Trombone (Grand Award, 1959)
- John Cacavas, Sound Spectrum for Orchestra (Murbo, 1963)
- Charlie Calello, Calello Serenade (Midsong, 1979)
- Cab Calloway, The Hi-De-Ho-Man (RCA, 1982)
- Joe Carroll, Joe Carroll with the Ray Bryant Quintet (Epic, 1956)
- Ron Carter, Parade (Milestone, 1979)
- Jim Chapin, Profile of a Jazz Drummer (Classic Jazz, 1977)
- Ray Charles, Genius + Soul = Jazz (Impulse!, 1961)
- Ray Charles, At the Club (Philips, 1966)
- Ray Charles Singers, Something Wonderful (Command, 1961)
- Al Cohn, Son of Drum Suite (RCA Victor, 1961)
- John Coates Jr., Our Love Is Here to Stay (Baybridge, 1982)
- John Coates Jr., Pocono Friends Encore (Omni Sound, 1982)
- Ray Conniff, S Wonderful! (Columbia, 1956)
- Don Costa, Echoing Voices and Trombones (United Artists, 1960)
- Miles Davis, Facets (CBS, 1967)
- Rusty Dedrick, A Jazz Journey (Monmouth, 1965)
- Johnny Desmond, Desmo Sings Desmond (Coral, 1957)
- Paul Desmond, Summertime (A&M, 1969)
- Eumir Deodato, Whirlwinds (MCA, 1974)
- Eumir Deodato, First Cuckoo (MCA, 1975)
- Vic Dickenson, Slidin' Swing (Jazztone, 1957)
- Jean DuShon, Feeling Good (Cadet, 1965)
- Charles Earland, Coming to You Live (Columbia, 1980)
- Bill Evans, Symbiosis (MPS/BASF, 1974)
- Gil Evans, Into the Hot (Impulse!, 1962)
- Maynard Ferguson, The Blues Roar (Mainstream, 1964) [reissued as part of The Big F (Mainstream, 1974)]
- Ella Fitzgerald & Count Basie, Ella and Basie! (Verve, 1963)
- Ella Fitzgerald, Ella Fitzgerald (Amiga, 1966)
- Aretha Franklin, Soul '69 (Atlantic, 1969)
- Aretha Franklin, Love All the Hurt Away (Arista, 1987)
- The Free Design, Heaven/Earth (Project 3, 1969)
- Barry Galbraith, Guitar and the Wind (Decca, 1958)
- Terry Gibbs, Swingin' with Terry Gibbs and His Orchestra (EmArcy, 1956)
- Dizzy Gillespie, Gillespiana (Verve, 1960)
- Dizzy Gillespie, Perceptions (Verve, 1961)
- Marty Gold, Swingin' West (RCA Victor, 1960)
- Marty Gold, 24 Pieces of Gold (RCA Victor, 1962)
- Benny Goodman, The Benny Goodman Story (Decca, 1955)
- Buddy Greco, I Like It Swinging (Columbia, 1961)
- Bobby Hackett, Bobby Hackett Sextet & Quintet (Storyville, 1999)
- Coleman Hawkins, The Hawk in Hi Fi (RCA Victor, 1956)
- Coleman Hawkins, Wrapped Tight (Impulse!, 1965)
- Neal Hefti, Concert Miniatures (Vik, 1957)
- Billie Holiday, Lady in Satin (Columbia, 1958)
- Bobby Hutcherson, Conception: The Gift of Love (Columbia, 1979)
- Fran Jeffries, Fran Jeffries Sings of Sex and the Single Girl (MGM, 1964)
- Jonah Jones & Jack Teagarden, Double Exposure (Ember, 1962)
- Beverly Kenney, Come Swing with Me (Roost, 1956)
- Irene Kral, SteveIreneo! (United Artists, 1959)
- Gene Krupa, Gene Krupa Plays Gerry Mulligan Arrangements (Verve, 1959)
- Gene Krupa, Percussion King (Verve, 1961)
- Frankie Laine & Buck Clayton, Jazz Spectacular (Columbia, 1956)
- Elliot Lawrence, Plays Tiny Kahn and Johnny Mandel Arrangements (Fantasy, 1956)
- Elliot Lawrence, Big Band Modern (Jazztone, 1957)
- Michel Legrand, Plays Richard Rodgers (Philips, 1963)
- Sonny Lester, After Hours Middle East (Time, 1962)
- Jon Lucien, Premonition (Columbia, 1976)
- Richard Maltby, Many Sided Maltby (Sesac, 1958)
- Richard Maltby, Ballads and Blues (Roulette, 1962)
- The Manhattan Transfer, Pastiche (Atlantic, 1978)
- Herbie Mann, Sultry Serenade (Riverside, 1957)
- Herbie Mann, Salute to the Flute (Epic, 1957)
- Marky Markowitz, Mark's Vibes (Famous Door, 1976)
- Marilyn McCoo & Billy Davis Jr., Marilyn & Billy (Columbia, 1978)
- Jackie Mclean, Monuments (RCA 1979)
- Gil Melle, The Complete Blue Note Fifties Sessions (Blue Note, 1953)
- Bette Midler, Thighs and Whispers (Atlantic, 1979)
- Blue Mitchell, Smooth as the Wind (Riverside, 1961)
- Wes Montgomery, Movin' Wes (Verve, 1964)
- Sam Most, Sam Most Quartet Plus Two (Debut, 1958)
- Tony Mottola, Tony Mottola and the Brass Menagerie (Project 3, 1974)
- Mark Murphy, Rah! (Riverside, 1961)
- Herbie Mann, Salute to the Flute (Epic, 1957)
- Herbie Mann, Sultry Serenade (Riverside, 1958)
- Gerry Mulligan, Mulligan in the Main (Phontastic, 1992)
- Oliver Nelson, Impressions of Phaedra (United Artists Jazz, 1962)
- Oliver Nelson, Afro/American Sketches (Prestige, 1962)
- Oliver Nelson, Full Nelson (Verve, 1963)
- Joe Newman, I'm Still Swinging (RCA Victor, 1955)
- Joe Newman, Salute to Satch (RCA Victor, 1956)
- Red Norvo, Urbie Green, Dave McKenna, Live at Rick's Cafe Americain (Flying Fish, 1979)
- Chico O'Farrill, Nine Flags (Impulse!, 1966)
- Charlie Parker, Bird with the Herd 1951 (Alamac, 1972)
- Peaches & Herb, Peaches & Herb (MCA, 1977)
- Tony Perkins, From My Heart (RCA Victor, 1958)
- Nick Perito, Blazing Latin Brass (United Artists, 1960)
- Esther Phillips, Performance (Kudu, 1974)
- Jimmy Ponder, All Things Beautiful (LRC 1978)
- Jimmy Ponder, Los Grandes Del Jazz 28 (Sarpe, 1980)
- Della Reese, Melancholy Baby (Jubilee, 1957)
- Irene Reid, It's Only the Beginning (MGM, 1963)
- Irene Reid, Room for One More (Verve, 1965)
- Joe Reisman, Door of Dreams (RCA Victor, 1957)
- Joe Reisman, Party Night at Joe's (RCA Victor, 1958)
- Henri Rene, Compulsion to Swing (RCA Victor, 1959)
- Frank Rosolino, North Sea Jazz Sessions Vol. 2 (Jazz World, 1992)
- Lillian Roth, I'll Cry Tomorrow (Philips, 1957)
- David Ruffin, Who I Am (Motown, 1975)
- Pee Wee Russell & Oliver Nelson, The Spirit of '67 (ABC Impulse!, 1972)
- Lalo Schifrin, New Fantasy (Verve, 1964)
- Lalo Schifrin, Towering Toccata (CTI, 1977)
- Shirley Scott, Great Scott!! ( (Impulse!, 1964)
- Doc Severinsen, The Big Band's Back in Town (Command, 1962)
- Phil Silvers, Phil Silvers and Swinging Brass (Columbia, 1957)
- Charlie Shavers & Sam Taylor Cole Porter Swings Easy in Stereo (Soundcraft, 1961)
- Zoot Sims, On the Trail (Pausa, 1978)
- Frank Sinatra, L.A. Is My Lady (Qwest, 1984)
- George Siravo, Rodgers & Hart Percussion & Strings (Time, 1960)
- Jimmy Smith, Bashin': The Unpredictable Jimmy Smith (Verve, 1962)
- Jimmy Smith, The Cat (Verve, 1964)
- Marvin Stamm, Machinations (Verve, 1968)
- Sonny Stitt, The Matadors Meet the Bull (Roulette, 1965)
- Sonny Stitt, I Keep Comin' Back! (Roulette, 1966)
- Kirby Stone, Frank Loesser's Broadway Hit Guys & Dolls Like Today (Columbia, 1962)
- Sylvia Syms, The Fabulous Sylvia Syms (20th Century Fox, 1964)
- Grady Tate, Windmills of My Mind (Skye, 1968)
- Billy Taylor, Right Here, Right Now! (Capitol, 1963)
- Clark Terry & Coleman Hawkins, Eddie Costa: Memorial Concert (Colpix, 1963)
- Clark Terry, What Makes Sammy Swing! (20th Century Fox, 1964)
- Stanley Turrentine, Nightwings (Fantasy, 1977)
- Stanley Turrentine, West Side Highway (Fantasy, 1978)
- Charlie Ventura, Chazz '77 (Famous Door, 1977)
- Walter Wanderley, Rain Forest (Verve, 1966)
- Dinah Washington, The Swingin' Miss "D" (EmArcy, 1957)
- Dinah Washington, Newport '58 (Mercury, 1972)
- Frances Wayne, The Warm Sound: Frances Wayne (Atlantic, 1957)
- Frank Wess, The Award Winner (Mainstream, 1964)
- Joe Wilder, The Pretty Sound (Columbia, 1959)
- Julie Wilson, Love (Dolphin, 1956)
- Kai Winding, Dirty Dog (Verve, 1966)
- Kai Winding, More Brass (Verve, 1966)
- Kai Winding, Carl Fontana, & Trummy Young, Oleo (Pausa, 1978)
- Lee Wiley, West of the Moon (RCA Victor, 1957)
- George Williams, Put On Your Dancing Shoes (United Artists, 1960)
- Jimmy Witherspoon, At the Monterey Jazz Festival (Columbia, 1975)
- Zulema, Z-licious (London, 1978)
