= Io sono Tony Scott =

2010 film by Franco Maresco

Io sono Tony Scott, ovvero come l'Italia fece fuori il più grande clarinettista del jazz
- Directed by: Franco Maresco
- Written by: Franco Maresco, Claudio Uzzo
- Produced by: Giuseppe Bisso, Cinico Cinema, Sicilia Film Commission, Rai Cinema
- Starring: Tony Scott
- Cinematography: Alessandro Abate
- Release date: August 11, 2010 (Locarno)
- Running time: 128 minutes
- Country: Italy
- Language: Italian

Io sono Tony Scott, ovvero come l'Italia fece fuori il più grande clarinettista del jazz (English: I am Tony Scott. The Story of How Italy Got Rid of the Greatest Jazz Clarinetist) is a 2012 Italian documentary directed by Franco Maresco.

It is a documentary film about the life of the Italian-American jazz musician Anthony Joseph Sciacca, known to the public as Tony Scott, starting from his childhood and youth in the USA, until his death, following complications from prostate cancer, in Rome in 2007.

In the film, a great number of American and Italian musicians are interviewed, such as the legend of clarinet Buddy DeFranco, pianist Mario Rusca and drummer Tony Arco and, also, a few non-musician friends of Scott’s. Moreover, Scott’s three wives and the two daughters from his second marriage provided many details about Tony Scott's life and, also, about their own feelings.

The documentary was shown at the 63rd Locarno International Film Festival (as a non-competing film) and at the Vancouver International Film Festival in 2010.

== Synopsis ==
Io sono Tony Scott, ovvero come l'Italia fece fuori il più grande clarinettista del jazz narrates in detail the private and artistic life of Tony Scott, who was voted “number one clarinetist” from Downbeat Jazz Magazine in 1959 and for 5 consecutive years. Through clips, pictures and interviews with people who knew Scott, this documentary film goes over the astonishing story of the life of Tony, who was a very popular clarinetist in the 1950s and ‘60s, but who later encountered personal and professional hardship, after relocating to Italy in the ‘70s.

In the first part of the documentary, in the USA, the facts about Scott’s artistic cooperation and strong friendship with Charlie "Bird" Parker and Billie Holiday are told, emphasizing his extraordinary talent as an experimenter and a virtuoso of jazz clarinet. In her interview, Tony’s first wife, Fran Attaway, reveals a hitherto unknown detail of his biography: according to her, during a trip to Indonesia, Tony was mistaken to be a spy and, consequently, detained and possibly tortured. Later in the film, it is suggested that this experience haunted him for the rest of his life and, perhaps, was the cause for the paranoid attitude he showed at times.

In the second part, which is set after his move to Europe, Tony’s personal decline and the waning of his success is narrated with strong sympathy and in great detail. In the film, it is suggested that such decline was caused both by the lack of recognition by the Italian public and music critics for his talent and by his difficult personality and erratic behaviour, which alienated Tony Scott from the circle of jazz musicians. Towards the end of his life, Tony lived in the outskirts of Rome with his wife Cinzia ; he died in March 2007, from complications caused by prostate cancer. His body was temporarily placed in a relative’s family vault in Salemi (Sicily), where his parents were born before they immigrated to New York. The town of Salemi has built a beautiful monument for him in the cemetery of Salemi under which he lies.

== Production ==
Director Franco Maresco wrote that "To go over Tony's private and professional life is to go over sixty years of jazz, of unbelievable personal and artistic encounters. At the same time, it is a narration of the American history of the second half of the past century, of the battles for civil and human rights, of which Tony Scott was one of the main and most passionate supporters".

== Cast ==
- Tony Scott as himself
