= Guitar Moods =

Studio album by Mundell Lowe
- Released: 1956
- Recorded: February 20 and March 2, 1956
- Studio: Van Gelder Studio, Hackensack, New Jersey
- Genre: Jazz
- Length: 33:08
- Label: Riverside
- Producer: Orrin Keepnews

Mundell Lowe chronology
The Mundell Lowe Quartet (1955)	Guitar Moods (1956)	New Music of Alec Wilder (1956)

Guitar Moods is an album by American jazz guitarist Mundell Lowe featuring tracks recorded in 1956 for the Riverside label.

== Reception ==
Professional ratings
Review scores
Source	Rating
Allmusic	4/5 stars

Allmusic awarded the album 4 stars with Scott Yanow calling it "quite memorable. Guitar Moods, which lives up to its name, is recommended".

== Track listing ==
1. "Speak Low" (Ogden Nash, Kurt Weill) - 2:38
2. "We'll Be Together Again" (Carl Fischer, Frankie Laine) - 2:07
3. "Memories of You" (Eubie Blake, Andy Razaf) - 3:48
4. "Ill Wind" (Harold Arlen, Ted Koehler) - 3:02
5. "You Don't Know What Love Is" (Gene de Paul, Don Raye) - 3:08
6. "I Dream Too Much" (Dorothy Fields, Jerome Kern) - 2:18
7. "June in January" (Ralph Rainger, Leo Robin) - 2:54
8. "I'll Take Romance" (Oscar Hammerstein II, Ben Oakland) - 1:53
9. "It's So Peaceful in the Country" (Alec Wilder) - 4:11
10. "Our Waltz" (David Rose) - 1:54
11. "I'm Old Fashioned" (Jerome Kern, Johnny Mercer) - 2:09
12. "Goodbye" (Gordon Jenkins) - 3:06
- Recorded at Van Gelder Studio in Hackensack, New Jersey on February 20 (tracks 1, 2, 5, 8, 9 & 11) and March 2 (tracks 3, 4, 6, 7, 10 & 12), 1956

== Personnel ==
- Mundell Lowe - guitar
- Al Klink - bass clarinet, flute (tracks 1, 4, 9)
- Phil Bodner - oboe, English horn (tracks 3, 6, 7, 12)
- Trigger Alpert - bass
- Ed Shaughnessy - drums
