= Jeff Tyzik =

American conductor (born 1951)

- Birth name: Jeff Tkazyik
- Born: August 1, 1951 (age 74); Hyde Park, New York, U.S.
- Genres: Jazz, pop, classical
- Occupation(s): Musician, composer, arranger, conductor
- Instrument: Trumpet
- Years active: 1973–present
- Labels: Capitol, Polydor, Amherst
- Website: jefftyzik.com

Jeff Tyzik (born Jeff Tkazyik, August 1, 1951) is an American conductor, arranger, and trumpeter. He has recorded jazz albums as a soloist and arranged pop and jazz music for orchestras.

== Early life and education ==
Tyzik, born in Hyde Park, New York, started playing cornet at age nine, after being inspired by the buglers in an Independence Day parade in nearby Poughkeepsie. He switched to trumpet at age 11. He attended the Eastman School of Music in Rochester, earning Bachelor of Music (1973) and Master of Music (1977) degrees.

== Career ==
While at Eastman, Tyzik met Chuck Mangione, a flugelhornist from Rochester who was teaching at the school. He worked with Mangione between 1973 and 1980 as lead trumpeter in Mangione's band and as co-producer of four albums. During this time, Tyzik also began a long collaboration with Doc Severinsen, when Severinsen brought him to London to work on two albums with the Royal Philharmonic Orchestra.

Tyzik recorded six albums as a solo trumpeter between 1981 and 1990, appearing on Capitol, Polydor, and Amherst Records. He performed in the Rochester area with his own big band in the late 1970s and early 1980s. During this time, Tyzik was also busy with Severinsen, serving as arranger and record producer for Severinsen and The Tonight Show Band. Tyzik won a Grammy Award in 1987 for producing the 1986 album The Tonight Show Band with Doc Severinsen.

In addition to Severinsen and Mangione, Tyzik has arranged music and produced records for Maynard Ferguson and for the Woody Herman Orchestra.

=== Rochester Philharmonic ===
The Rochester Philharmonic Orchestra approached Tyzik and Allen Vizzutti (a friend of Tyzik's from Eastman) in 1983 about creating a pops program for the orchestra. The pair spent the next decade working with orchestras around the country on similar programs.

In 1994, Tyzik was named Principal Pops Conductor of the Rochester Philharmonic Orchestra, a position he still holds. Since then, he has established himself as one of the country's preeminent Pops conductors and arrangers, acting as Principal Pops Conductor for the RPO, the Dallas Symphony, Oregon Symphony, Vancouver Symphony Orchestra, The Florida Orchestra, Detroit Symphony Orchestra and the Seattle Symphony. He has appeared as guest conductor for numerous other orchestras in the U.S., Canada, and even Monte Carlo. He also conducted the Brass Band of Battle Creek for a 1996 independent album.

His arrangements of popular and jazz tunes for full orchestra have been widely performed. Publisher G. Schirmer commissioned Tyzik to arrange some of Duke Ellington's jazz suites for orchestra, including Black, Brown and Beige and The Nutcracker Suite. The Royal Philharmonic, the Cincinnati Pops Orchestra, and the Summit Brass have all recorded music arranged or composed by Tyzik.

Tyzik later branched out into more traditional orchestral styles, conducting a few RPO concerts outside of the Pops series. At one such concert, he premiered his own Concerto for Trombone and Orchestra, and later premiered his wind ensemble orchestration of the same piece with the Eastman Wind Ensemble at Carnegie Hall.

A 2007 recording by the RPO, with Tyzik conducting and Jon Nakamatsu on piano, of George Gershwin's Piano Concerto in F, Rhapsody in Blue, and Cuban Overture peaked at #3 on the Billboard classical charts. The album, on the Harmonia Mundi label, received very positive reviews, with David Hurwitz calling it "unquestionably the best Gershwin disc to come along in years".

== Personal life ==
Tyzik lives in Rochester with his wife, Jill. Their daughter is mezzo-soprano Jami Tyzik. John Tkazyik, former mayor of Poughkeepsie, is a second cousin.

== Discography ==
- Farthest Corner of My Mind (independent, 1979)
- Prophecy (independent, 1980)
- Radiance (Capitol, 1982)
- Jammin' in Manhattan (Polydor, 1984)
- Smile (Polydor, 1985)
- Distant Dreams (Amherst, 1990)
