= TV Action Jazz! =

Studio album by Mundell Lowe and his All Stars
- Released: 1959
- Recorded: February 3, 4 & 5, 1959; New York City
- Genre: Jazz
- Label: RCA Camden; CAL-522
- Producer: Chick Crumpacker and Frank O'Donnell

Mundell Lowe chronology
Porgy & Bess (1958)	TV Action Jazz! (1959)	Themes from Mr. Lucky, the Untouchables and Other TV Action Jazz (1960)

TV Action Jazz! is an album by American jazz guitarist Mundell Lowe and an ad hoc octet dubbed his All Stars.

== Inception and Release ==
TV Action Jazz comprised the group's interpretations of theme music from private eye, and legal and police drama television programs. The album was recorded in Webster Hall in New York City over three days in February 1959 for the RCA Camden label.

RCA released TV Action Jazz in April 1959, along with Porgy and Bess, which featured the group's interpretations of the George Gershwin folk opera. The two disks were Lowe's first recordings for RCA, coming over from the Riverside jazz label.

== Sales and Reception ==
Professional ratings
Review scores
Source	Rating
Allmusic	4/5 stars

In November 1959, TV Action Jazz was ranked by rack jobbers among the top ten best selling low-priced LPs, as tabulated by both Billboard and Cash Box.

Allmusic awarded the album 4 stars with its review by Scott Yanow stating, "this is an album worth searching for. The solos are excellent and the music is much better than expected".

Based on the album's success, Lowe released a second album of theme music a year later with a different all-star lineup, Themes from Mr. Lucky, The Untouchables and Other TV Action Jazz.

== Track listing ==
1. "Peter Gunn" (Henry Mancini) - 2:21
2. ""Mike Hammer" (David Kahn, Melvyn Leonard) - 3:13
3. "Perry Mason Theme" (Fred Steiner) - 1:51
4. "77 Sunset Strip" (Mack David, Jerry Livingston) - 4:46
5. "M Squad" (Count Basie) - 4:19
6. "The Thin Man" (Pete Rugolo) - 2:34
7. "Naked City" (George Duning, Ned Washington) - 4:27
8. "Fall Out! (from Peter Gunn)" (Mancini) - 3:50

== Personnel ==
- Mundell Lowe - guitar
- Donald Byrd - trumpet
- Jimmy Cleveland - trombone
- Herbie Mann - flute, tenor saxophone (uncredited)
- Tony Scott - clarinet, baritone saxophone
- Eddie Costa - piano, vibraphone
- Don Payne - bass
- Ed Shaughnessy - drums
