= A Grand Night for Swinging =

Studio album by Mundell Lowe
- Released: 1957
- Recorded: March 7 and April 10, 1957; Reeves Sound Studios, New York City
- Genre: Jazz
- Length: 37:56
- Labels: Riverside; RLP 12-238
- Producer: Orrin Keepnews

Mundell Lowe chronology
New Music of Alec Wilder (1956)	A Grand Night for Swinging (1957)	Porgy & Bess (1958)

A Grand Night for Swinging is an album by American jazz guitarist Mundell Lowe featuring tracks recorded in 1957 for the Riverside label.

== Reception ==
Professional ratings
Review scores
Source	Rating
Allmusic	4/5 stars
The Penguin Guide to Jazz Recordings	3/4 stars

Allmusic awarded the album 4 stars stating "A Grand Night for Swinging will be a real treat for fans unfamiliar with Lowe's earlier work, and a satisfying selection for fans of good jazz guitar".

== Track listing ==
1. "It's a Grand Night for Swinging" (Billy Taylor) – 4:22
2. "Blues Before Freud" (Mundell Lowe) – 7:18
3. "Easy to Love" (Cole Porter) – 7:19
4. "It Could Happen to You" (Johnny Burke, Jimmy Van Heusen) – 2:53
5. "Love Me or Leave Me" (Walter Donaldson, Gus Kahn) – 3:35
6. "You Turned the Tables on Me" (Louis Alter, Sidney Mitchell) – 5:37
7. "Crazy Rhythm" (Irving Caesar, Roger Wolfe Kahn, Joseph Meyer) – 6:52
- Recorded at Reeves Sound Studios in New York City on March 7 (tracks 1, 3, 4 & 7) April 10 (tracks 2, 5 & 6), 1957

== Personnel ==
- Mundell Lowe – guitar
- Billy Taylor – piano
- Les Grinage – bass
- Ed Thigpen – drums
- Gene Quill – alto saxophone (tracks 2, 5 & 6)
