= All About Urbie Green and His Big Band =

Studio album by Urbie Green
- Released: 1956
- Recorded: July 31 & August 3 and 23, 1956
- Studio: Van Gelder Studio, Hackensack, NJ
- Genre: Jazz
- Length: 38:20
- Label: ABC-Paramount; ABC-137
- Producer: Creed Taylor

Coleman Hawkins chronology
Blues and Other Shades of Green (1955)	All About Urbie Green and His Big Band (1956)	Let's Face the Music and Dance (1957)

All About Urbie Green and His Big Band (also referred to as All About Urbie), is an album by trombonist Urbie Green which was recorded in 1956 and released on the ABC-Paramount label.

== Reception ==
Professional ratings
Review scores
Source	Rating
AllMusic	3.5/5 stars
Disc	4/5 stars

Jason Ankeny of AllMusic states, "John Carisi's thoughtful arrangements nevertheless place Green squarely at center stage, and if anything, the large settings and friendly competition seem to galvanize his solos. No matter how many players join in on a particular track, there's no question about who's in charge".

== Track listing ==
1. "Cherokee" (Ray Noble) – 2:33
2. "I Ain't Got Nobody" (Spencer Williams, Robert A. Graham) – 3:28
3. "Stella by Starlight" (Victor Young, Ned Washington) – 3:00
4. "Little John" (John Carisi) – 3:09
5. "With The Wind And The Rain In Your Hair" (Jack Lawrence, Clara Edwards) – 3:07
6. "'Round Midnight" (Thelonious Monk, Cootie Williams, Bernie Hanighen) – 3:15
7. "Sleep" (Adam Geibel, Earl Burtnett) – 2:48
8. "Soft Winds" (Benny Goodman, Fred Royal) – 6:25
9. "Springsville" (Carisi) – 3:11
10. "Plain Bill from Bluesville" (Carisi) – 4:06
11. "Home" (Peter van Steeden, Geoffrey Clarkson, Harry Clarkson) – 3:18

== Personnel ==
- Urbie Green – trombone
- John Carisi – trumpet, arranger
- Joe Wilder, Nick Travis, Phil Sunkel, Doc Severinsen – trumpet
- Chauncey Welsh, Jack Satterfield, Jack Green, Lou McGarity, Rex Peer – trombone
- Bill Barber, Don Butterfield – tuba
- Al Cohn, Ray Beckenstein – tenor saxophone
- Sol Schlinger, Danny Bank – baritone saxophone
- Dave McKenna – piano
- Jack Lesberg, Vinnie Burke – bass
- Osie Johnson – drums
