= Mihailo Živanović =

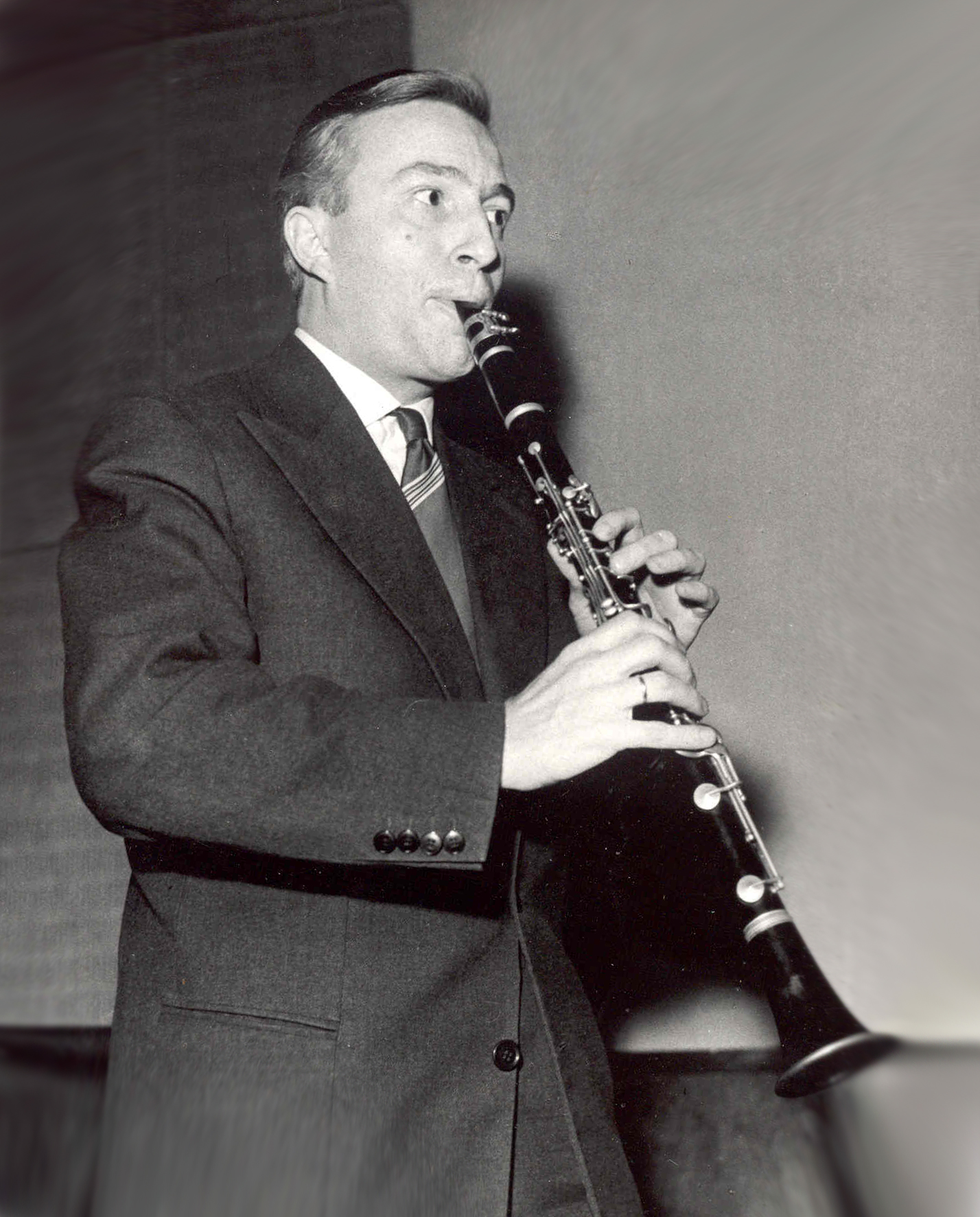

Background information
- Also known as: Žuti (Yellow)
- Born: Mihailo Živanović; 17 February 1928; Belgrade, Kingdom of Serbs, Croats and Slovenes
- Died: 18 July 1989 (aged 61)
- Genres: Classical, Jazz
- Occupations: Soloist, orchestral musician, composer, arranger and conductor
- Instruments: Clarinet and baritone saxophone

Mihailo Živanović (17 February 1928 – 18 July 1989), known as Mika-Žuti (Yellow), was a prominent Serbian and Yugoslav clarinetist, saxophonist, composer, conductor of RTB Light Music Orchestras and arranger.

== Biography ==
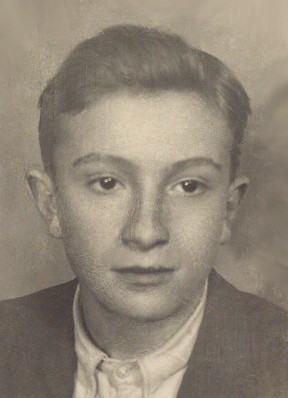
Two years later, twelve-year-old pianist Mihailo-Mika Živanović began to learn to play the clarinet.

Mihailo Mika Živanović - Žuti (Yellow) was born in Prota Mateja street in Belgrade in 1928.

His first contact with music, dating back to the 1936, was when the father of an eight-year-old Mika enrolled him in primary music school Stanković where he was first taught to play the piano. The year 1942 was crucial in his life because, upon hearing the sound of the clarinet through Radio London, he realized that this was what he wanted. And since then, fascinated by the beauty of jazz, he had regularly visited Concert Hall in Belgrade and listened to jazz concerts of then our masters (Elija Genić, Mladen Guteša, Vojin Popović and others), as well as of the foreign performers (Kari Burnett, German singer).

Mihailo attended the Third Male Grammar School and Secondary Music School "Stankovic", the piano department. He then enrolled at the Faculty of Sciences in Belgrade, department of chemistry, and left it for the music before graduation.

After World War II, in 1945, Mihailo continued to learn the piano in Secondary Music School "Stanković".

The biggest turning point in his life happened in 1946 when he saw and bought his first clarinet in a consignment shop. Since he had possessed a good knowledge of music, he began to practice day and night, this time – clarinet.

At the age of eighteen, inspired by the music of Glenn Miller and Woody Herman Orchestra, he made a firm decision to devote his life to the clarinet and music and graduated the clarinet from Secondary Music School "Slavenski" in the class of professor Franjo Partlić.

== Work with the orchestra Fis-dur ==
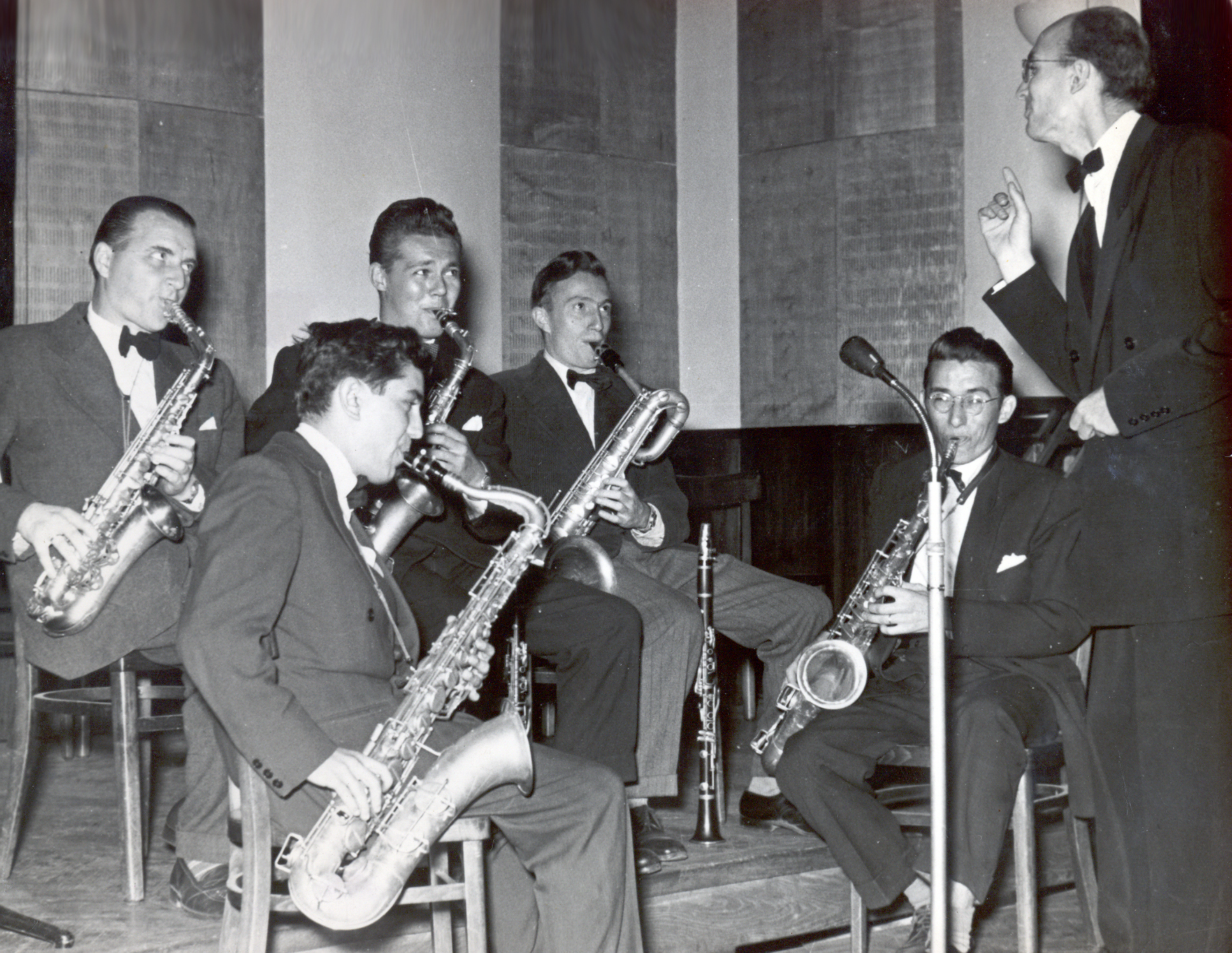
Orchestra Rehearsal in 1952. In the top row: Vladimir Plotnjikov, Vladimir Dajzinger, Mika Živanović. In the bottom row: Eduard Sađil and Karlo Takač. Conducted by Mladen Guteša.

Jazz was very appealing to Mihailo Živanović. Accomplishing himself in this field, in 1946 he formed a jazz orchestra Fis-dur which he named after his clarinet Fis-dur. The orchestra was led by Michael himself. Due to the quality, the orchestra had very soon become one of the most famous in Belgrade. The first members of the orchestra were: Milo Dimitrijević (guitar), Duško Radić (piano), Stanislav Sodermajer (drums) and Mihailo Živanović (clarinet).

Anxious to learn and progress further in music in 1946. he continued to study clarinet at the Allmusic Academy where he met Eduard Sađil, also a student of clarinet.

Orchestra Fis-dur achieved success after success: performances, tours, great delight and standing ovations of the satisfied audience. In the year 1947, there was a large change in the orchestra with the new top musicians: Predrag Ivanović (trumpet), dr Aleksandar Pejić (accordion), Milovan Vukajlović-Genije (piano and accordion), Predrag Stefanović-Grof (-Count)(trombone) and Branko Pejaković (bass). Only Sodermajer and Živanović remained of the old members.

Significant, almost crucial meeting with Bora Roković (a trumpeter, composer, arranger, pianist and accordionist) occurred while playing at a dance party in 1949. Bora heard him and was impressed by his talent. He wanted to help Mihajlo, introduce him more and better into the world of jazz and direct him to the true value. He offered him to join his orchestra. Živanović played there until the end of 1953. Soon he was invited by Aleksandar Nećak and played in all three orchestras at the same time.

Orchestra Fis-dur existed until 1950.

== Work in Radio Belgrade Revue Orchestra ==
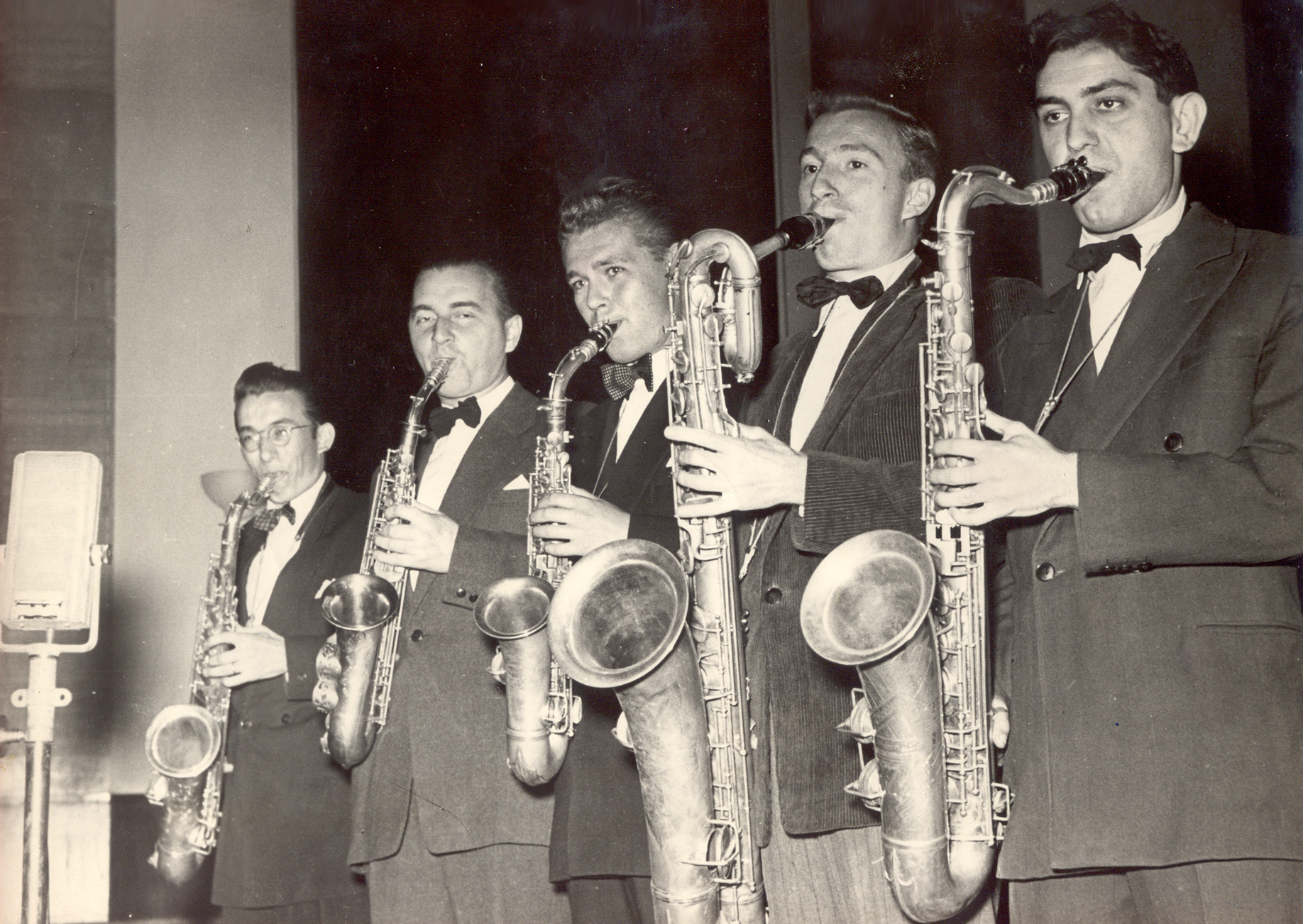
Saxophone line (from right to left): second, after Eduarda Sađila is Mika-Žuti (Yellow).

Well-known trombonist Mladen Guteša founded Radio Belgrade Light Revue Orchestra on 18 January 1948. By the end of 1949. he invited Mihailo Živanović to become its member. Mihajlo was then a student of the Music Academy in the class of renowned professor Bruno Brun. For such a work and permanent employment, he had to get permission from his professor. Professor Bruno gave him consent.

In the Revue Orchestra Mihailo first played the baritone saxophone, and then the instrument which he had been studying – the clarinet. Radio Belgrade Revue Orchestra had many successful tours and concerts. One in Zagreb in 1953, which proved that Belgrade was the center of Yugoslav jazz.

Before the end of the study in 1954, persuaded by professors from the Academy, he left Radio Belgrade Revue Orchestra and got a job in the National Theatre Orchestra (Belgrade Opera) where he worked four years (until 1958).

As a student at the Academy he achieved a remarkable success in the Yugoslav competition of young artists, clarinetist of classical music, in Skopje in 1954. There he won the second prize (the first was not awarded to anyone).

In 1955 he graduated clarinet successfully.

== Work in Mihailo Zivanovic's octet ==
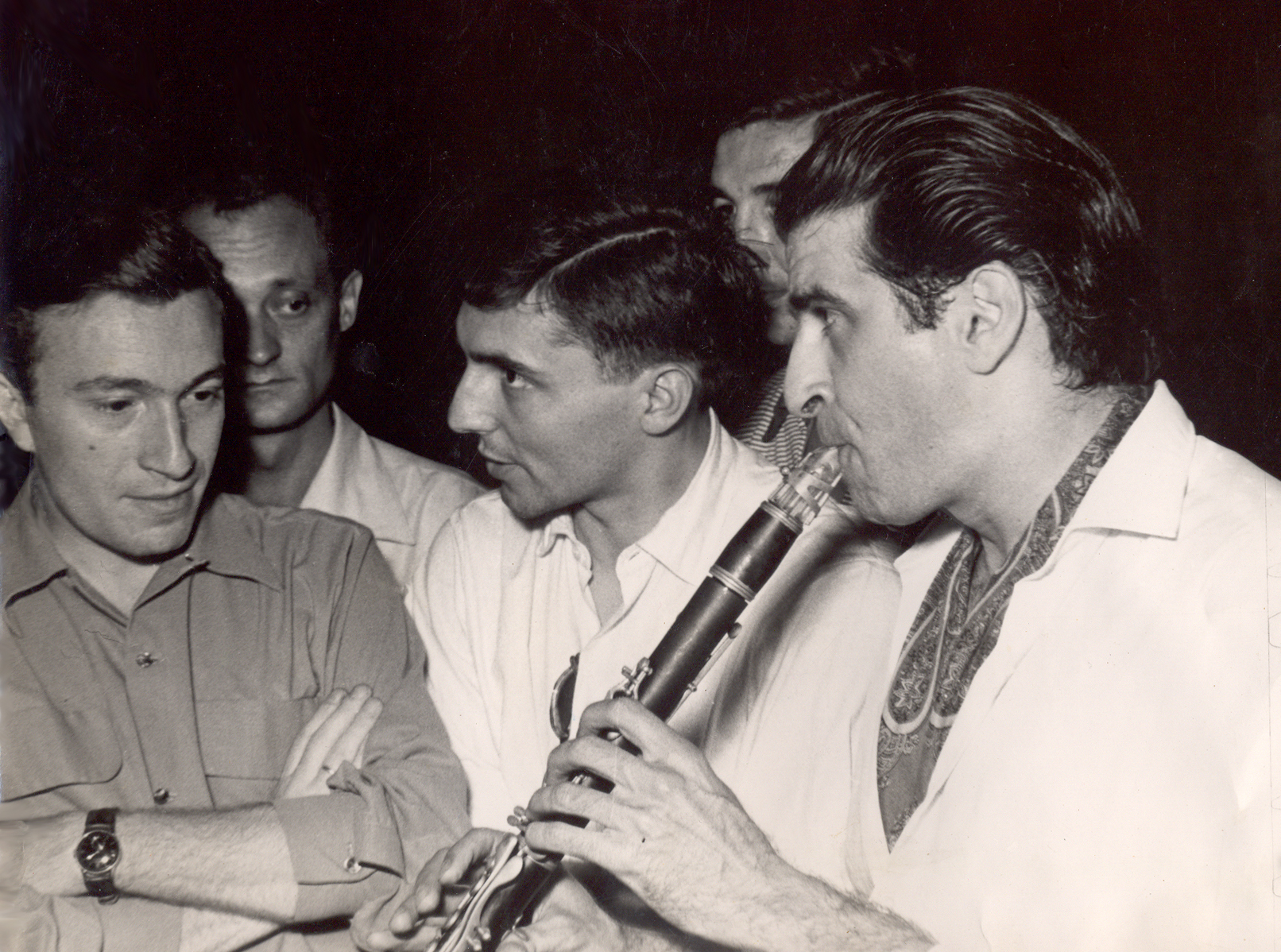
Mihailo Živanović (first left) and world-renowned clarinetist Tony Scott (first right).

In 1955 Zivanovic founded Mihailo Zivanovic's Octet in which he played the baritone saxophone. Alongside him, Predrag Ivanović played the trumpet, Nikola Dajzinger the alt saxophone, Eduard Sađil the tenor saxophone, Predrag Stefanović the trombone, Vojkan Đonovićić the guitar, Robert Hauber the piano and Rade Milivojević the drums.

Octet had been performing for 10 years with great success on radio stations in the country and abroad. It soon became one of the leading Yugoslav ensembles for contemporary and experimental jazz music.

== Further life ==
Since 1958 almost to the last days of his life, he had been employed by the Music Production branch of Radio Television of Serbia. That same year he became a permanent member of the Light String Orchestra led by Ilija Genić and later a conductor of the Jazz Orchestra i Revue Orchestra of Radio Television Belgrade.

In 1960 he became a member of Serbian Composers Association.

In 1975 he was appointed head of the Light Ensemble of RTB, and since 1978 permanent conductor of the Light Orchestra of RTB until his death in Belgrade.

== Importance of Mihailo Zivanovic ==
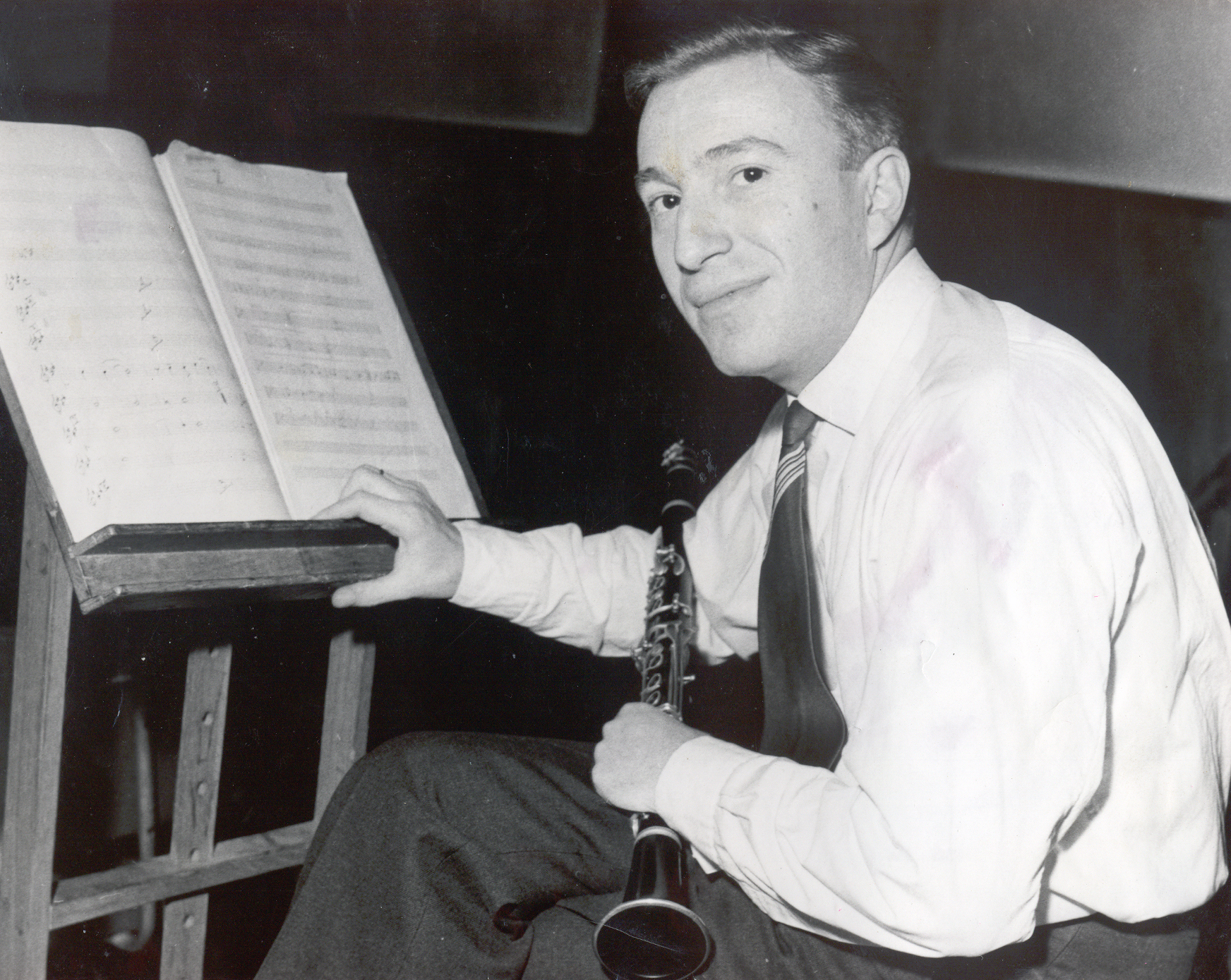
Photograph from 1960 when Mihailo Živanović composed famous Rhapsody for Clarinet and Orchestra.

Mihailo Živanović was a very prolific composer. He wrote children's and stage music, popular songs, pop songs, and concert music, as well as numerous compositions and arrangements for the Yugoslav radio and TV stations.

He continuously followed the developments in the world of jazz and light music and was always in the contemporary musical trends of his time. Over forty years, he extensively composed different genres of music with a great success. He wrote over 300 instrumental, light, and vocal-instrumental compositions.

Until then, only foreign jazz music was played by Belgrade jazz orchestras. Živanović was one of the first jazz musicians who began to compose modern domestic jazz, and which he engaged in with a great enthusiasm. Živanović enriched Yugoslav light and jazz music with his great knowledge and activity, working up to the last day. Živanović's many achievements have been permanently recorded in the history of Yugoslav jazz creativity.

He wrote the music and scene songs for the then popular singers such as: Arsen Dedić, Nada Knežević, Lola Novaković, Bisera and Senka Veletanlić, Anica Zubović, Dragan Stojnić, Tihomir Petrović, “Lutajuća srca”, Đorđe Marjanović, Zafir Hadžimanov, Krunoslav Slabinac, Dragan Mijalkovski and many others.

He was one of the most prolific creators of music for children.

At a time when intensively engaged in the instrument, he was known as one of the most inventive and best soloist on the clarinet and baritone saxophone. He performed in concerts at home and abroad with a great success (Germany, Austria, Romania, US). As a soloist, he represented his country at the Berlin concert in the series "Music knows no boundaries".

At the Light Music Festivals Mihailo appeared as a conductor. He was the conductor of the RTB Light Music Orchestra and the first clarinetist of Belgrade RTV Symphonic Orchestra. Mihailo was proficient in making arrangements and in this field left his great contribution and indelible mark.

== Work of Mihailo Zivanovic ==
Mihailo Mika Živanović began composing in 1950. His creative work is enormous:

=== Vocal-instrumental light melodies ===
These works include:

- "Waiting"
- "If We Were Someone Else’s" (Nada Knežević)
- "Old Oak" and "Traces"(Krunoslav-Kićo Slabinac)
- "Do Not Lie" (Dušan Jakšić)
- "Meeting in the Baš-čaršija"
- "Don’t you Know that I Love You"
- "Give me a Smile"
- "When will You Come to Me"
- "I’m Calling You, my Love"
- "One Afternoon"
- "One Night" (Dragan Stojnić)
- "Anxiety"
- "When are You Going to Tell Me You Love Me"
- "May"
- "Our Last Evening"
- "The Story of Seville"
- "I Am Waiting"
- "Not Now" (Belgrade Spring, Arsen Dedić)
- "Spring Day"
- "Come When the Winter’s Gone" (Bisera Veletanlić)
- "It’s Not a Dream"

=== Instrumental chamber music ===
These works include:

- "Cat Game"
- "Orient"
- "Five Giants"
- "Midnight Sounds"
- "Crossroads"
- "The Merry Five" (music for an instrumental octet)

=== Musical stagework ===
These works include:

- Music for ballet of old American ballad "Frankie and Johnny" for Belgrade Contemporary Theatre in 1962
- Ballet Suite "Biljana" in 1963
- Ballet number for musical play "Betina" for Contemporary Theatre
- Ballet music for Sava Mrmak's film "Whistle at Eight". For this first show in our film he composed two ballet numbers:

1. "Vespa" and 2. "Amusement Park"

- Music for the play "Anti-aging Remedy"

=== Symphonic music with soloist ===
These works include:

- "Fantasy for Clarinet and Orchestra"
- "Rhapsody for Clarinet and Orchestra"
- "The part in F minor for Clarinet and Orchestra"
- "Sketches for Clarinet"
- "Nostalgy"
- "You're Always Smiling"
- "Blues for Clarinet". With his composition Živanović represented the country at the concert "Jazz in the Elysian Fields" in Berlin
- "Rhapsody for Alto Saxophone and Symphony Orchestra" he wrote in 1965 for television. The same year, it was performed at the NORD SEE Festival in Ostend (Belgium).
- "Ballad for Alto Saxophone"
- "Invention for Alto Saxophone".
- "Ballad for Harmonica".

=== Musical works for the standard jazz orchestra ===
These works include:

- "Abandoned Garden"
- "The Spring Landscape"
- "Salome"
- "Merry Rhythm"
- "Song"
- "Miniature"
- "And so Every Day"
- "Dreams"
- "Sutivan Nights"

=== Children's songs ===
Mihajlo Živanović was a composer who had written the most songs for children on the theme of friendship and camaraderie.

- "Hand in Hand" and "Empire of the Fellowship" are certainly the best known of that cycle.

These, and other songs were sung by RTB Children's Choir, Branko Milićević, Predrag Panić and Dragan Laković.

=== Music for television series ===
The last 10 years of life, he was a regular collaborator of the Children's Television. He had composed music for children's TV series like:

- "Cube, Cube, Little Cube"
- "Kolaric Panic"
- "Around the World in Eight Notes"
- "Cricket’s Album"
- "Guess"

("Cricket’s Album" and "Guess" are children's compositions too, were recorded on gramophone records by PGP and on a dozen different records there are compositions interpreted by the popular singers of the time.)

For the Belgrade television show

- "Race", Živanović composed ballet suite "Biljana was Whitening the Linen" based on the motives of the eponymous folk melody. This is one of the first attempts in our country to use popular melodies for writing music for ballet.

== Recognition and awards ==
Mihailo Živanović won numerous awards in the field of art. Some of them were:

- The first award of the Critics’ jury and the second award of the Jury for light melody "Clock’s Story" at the Festival of Light Melodies in Opatija in 1959.
- The second award for light orchestral music of Yugoslav Radio Television for his work "Rhapsody for Clarinet and Orchestra" in 1961.
- The second award of the jury at the Belgrade Spring Festival 1961 for "Rhapsody for Clarinet and Symphony Orchestra" (the first prize was not awarded).

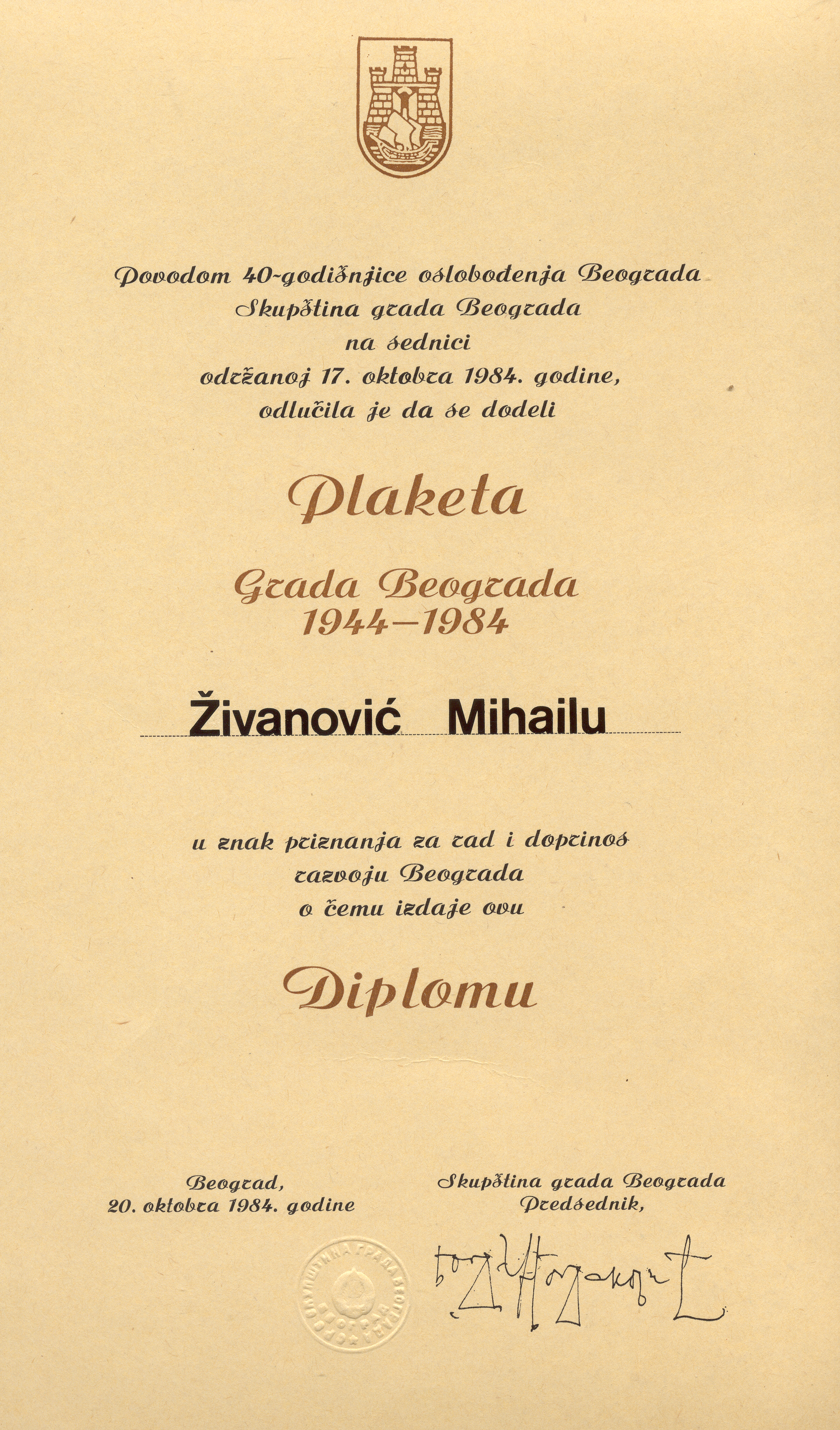
Great recognition to Mihailo Živanović, was the Memorial plaque Belgrade 1944–1984 which he received on the 40th Anniversary of the liberation of Belgrade.

- The first award for the "Rhapsody for Clarinet" at the JRT competition for light orchestral music in 1974.
- The first award in Radenci (Slovenia) for the "Sketch for Clarinet".
- Numerous awards of jury and audience at various festivals: the Belgrade Spring 1968, 1972, 1973, and the award for the best arrangement of romance in 1974.
- Numerous awards at the JNA festivals in 1970, 1971, 1972 and 1982 (the first award for a song inspired by military life at the Army festival. The song "Old Oak" was sung by Krunoslav-Kićo Slabinac, and the first award for the song "Fly, Fly, Blue Bird" on 21 December 1984).
- Award of Radio Belgrade and JRT for children's music.
- Award in Japan for child's song "Raindrops".
- He was awarded Order of Labour with silver wreath.
- The second award (the first was not awarded) at the Yugoslav Young Artists Competition, Skopje in 1954.
- For his activity in the music field he was awarded Order of Labour with silver wreath.
- Award of Serbian Composers Association.
- The first award in Vienna as soloist on clarinet for performing Artie Shaw "Concerto for Clarinet and Orchestra". He was accompanied by the jazz orchestra of KUD Branko Krsmanovic.
- The first award of Serbian Composers Association for "Fantasia" composed for revue orchestra (composer's favorite award).
- Radio Belgrade "News" was tuned with the new music that had been selected at the internal competition. Mihailo Živanović was the author of the music. Its rhythmic movement basically imitated operation of a teleprinter.
- Recipient of the Memorial plaque "Belgrade 1944–1984" to mark the 40th Anniversary of the liberation of Belgrade. Belgrade City Council awarded him this recognition on 25 December 1984. as an eminent individual – artist important for the development of Belgrade.
- Gold Medal of the Union of Yugoslav Composers in recognition of merit and work on promoting and affirming Yugoslav composers.
- Plaque of Radio Belgrade regarding the Day of RTB for longtime contribution to programs of Radio Belgrade, 1 November 1986.

== Literature ==
- Twenty-five years of the Music Academy in Belgrade from 1937 to 1962, Grafos, Belgrade, 1963, p 107.
- 40 years of the Faculty of Music (Music Academy) from 1937 to 1977, University of Arts in Belgrade, Belgrade, 1977, p 89.
- Fifty years of the Faculty of Music (Music Academy) from 1937 to 1987, University of Arts in Belgrade, Belgrade, 1988, p 141.
- Eberst, Anton: Clarinet and clarinetists, Forum, Novi Sad, 1963.
- Lexicon of Yugoslav music, Zagreb, 1984, vol. II, p 569.
- Petar Luković Better Past, Scenes from the musical life of Yugoslavia from 1940 to 1989, Youth, Belgrade, 1989, p. 9, 16, 18, 21, 22, 26, 35 and 36.
