= Trigger Happy! =

Studio album by Trigger Alpert
- Released: 1956
- Recorded: October 29 and November 23 & 30, 1956
- Studio: Reeves Sound Studios, New York City
- Genre: Jazz
- Length: 33:08
- Label: Riverside; RLP 12-225
- Producer: Orrin Keepnews

East Coast Sounds Cover

Professional ratings
Review scores
Source	Rating
Allmusic	4/5 stars

Trigger Happy! is the sole album led by American jazz double bassist Trigger Alpert which was recorded in 1956 for the Riverside label. The album was also issued under Zoot Sims Al Cohn and Tony Scott's names as East Coast Sounds.

== Reception ==
Allmusic awarded the East Coast Sounds album 4 stars with Ken Dryden stating "Zoot Sims and Al Cohn made many records together in small-group settings, but this isn't one of their better-known dates, though it is a rewarding one... Recommended". The British Gramophone magazine's review from 1958 called it "a session that presents first-class soloists within settings that are witty as well as intelligent. The mood is gay rather than profound, the approach formal and not at all intense".

== Track listing ==
1. "Treat Me Rough" (George Gershwin, Ira Gershwin) - 2:50
2. "Looking at You" (Cole Porter) - 4:20
3. "Love Me Tomorrow (But Leave Me Alone Today)" (Vernon Duke, John La Touche) - 4:51
4. "Trigger Happy" (Tony Scott) - 2:28
5. "Tranquilizer" (Dick Hyman) - 4:28
6. "I Like the Likes of You" (Duke, Yip Harburg) - 4:08
7. "I Wish I Were in Love Again" (Lorenz Hart, Richard Rodgers) - 3:35
8. "I Don't Want to Be Alone Again" (Johnny Mercer, Jimmie Smith) - 3:28
9. "Trigger Fantasy"(Trigger Alpert) - 5:24
10. "Where's That Rainbow?" (Hart, Rodgers) - 3:35
- Recorded at Reeves Sound Studios in New York City October 29, 1956 (tracks 1–3), November 23, 1956 (tracks 4–6) and November 30, 1956 (tracks 7–10)

== Personnel ==
- Trigger Alpert - bass
- Joe Wilder - trumpet
- Urbie Green - trombone
- Tony Scott - clarinet, tenor saxophone, arranger
- Zoot Sims - tenor saxophone, alto saxophone
- Al Cohn - tenor saxophone, baritone saxophone
- Ed Shaughnessy - drums
- Dick Hyman, Marty Paich - arranger
