= Themes from Mr. Lucky, The Untouchables and Other TV Action Jazz =

Themes from Mr. Lucky, The Untouchables, and Other TV Action Jazz

Studio album by Mundell Lowe
- Released: 1960
- Recorded: June 1 & 6, 1960
- Studio: New York City
- Genre: Jazz
- Label: RCA Camden
- Producer: Chick Crumpacker

Mundell Lowe chronology
TV Action Jazz! (1959)	Themes from Mr. Lucky, The Untouchables, and Other TV Action Jazz (1960)	Satan in High Heels (1961)

Themes from Mr. Lucky, The Untouchables and Other TV Action Jazz is the second album by American jazz guitarist Mundell Lowe with theme music from detective, lawyer, and police television programs. The album was recorded in 1960 for RCA Camden.

This album came after the success of TV Action Jazz!, Lowe's previous album of television theme songs. Themes includes music from Markham, Mr. Lucky, Johnny Staccato, Tightrope!, and The Untouchables.

The record label Lone Hill Jazz combined both albums into one CD compilation, Complete TV Action Jazz, released in 2005.

== Track listing ==
1. "Theme from Tightrope" (George Duning) – 2:52
2. "Hawaiian Eye" (Jerry Livingston, Mack David) – 3:53
3. "Theme from Mr. Lucky" (Henry Mancini) – 3:11
4. "Theme from the Untouchables" (Nelson Riddle) – 2:53
5. "Bourbon Street Beat" (Livingston, David) – 2:47
6. "Detectives Theme" (Herschel Burke Gilbert) – 2:32
7. "Markham Theme" (Stanley Wilson) – 2:53
8. "Johnny Staccato's Theme" (Elmer Bernstein) – 4:00

== Personnel ==
- Mundell Lowe – guitar
- Clark Terry – trumpet
- Willie Dennis – trombone
- Urbie Green – trombone
- Frank Rehak – trombone
- Rod Levitt – bass trombone
- Dick Hixson – bass trombone
- Phil Bodner – reeds
- Eddie Costa – piano, vibraphone
- George Duvivier – double bass
- Ed Shaughnessy – drums
