= Music for Yoga Meditation and Other Joys =

Studio album by Tony Scott
- Released: 1968
- Recorded: February 28, 1968 in New York City
- Genre: Free jazz; Ambient music; new age
- Length: 38:24
- Label: Verve V6-8742
- Producer: Pete Spargo

Tony Scott chronology
Djanger Bali (1967)	Music for Yoga Meditation and Other Joys (1968)	52nd St. Scene (1971)

Music for Yoga Meditation and Other Joys is a 1968 album by Tony Scott.

== Reception ==
Professional ratings
Review scores
Source	Rating
AllMusic	4/5 stars

The album was reviewed by Stewart Mason for Allmusic who described it as "...not just a lifestyle curio, but a musically interesting lifestyle curio. Strip away the Age of Aquarius trappings (although the liner notes are good for an ironic giggle) and Music for Yoga Meditation and Other Joys is not dissimilar to what Alice Coltrane and Pharoah Sanders would get up to over the next decade: long, flowing melodies and one-chord drones colored by elements of Indian classical music and other world music influences". Mason praised the "...surprising variety of moods and tonalities given the self-limiting instrument lineup" concluding that "though this is too twee and hippie-ish to be called jazz, ambient and space rock fans will be fascinated by it".

== Track listing ==
1. "Prahna (Life Force)" – 4:15
2. "Shiva (The Third Eye)" – 5:06
3. "Samadhi (Ultimate Bliss)" – 4:49
4. "Hare Krishna (Hail Krishna)" – 6:15
5. "Hatha (Sun and Moon)" – 3:40
6. "Kundalina (Serpent Power)" – 4:42
7. "Sahasrara (Highest Chakra)" – 3:10
8. "Triveni (Sacred Knot)" – 3:20
9. "Shanti (Peace)" – 2:48
10. "Homage to Lord Krishna" – 5:04
- All music composed by Tony Scott

== Personnel ==
- Tony Scott – clarinet
- Collin Walcott – sitar

Production

- Acy R. Lehman – art direction
- Ronald Walotsky – cover illustration
- Val Valentin – engineer
- Pete Spargo – producer
