= New Music of Alec Wilder =

Studio album by Mundell Lowe and his Orchestra
- Released: 1956
- Recorded: June 12, 19, and July 3, 1956
- Studio: Reeves Sound Studios, New York City
- Genre: Jazz
- Length: 30:21
- Label: Riverside
- Producer: Orrin Keepnews

Mundell Lowe chronology
| Guitar Moods (1956) | New Music of Alec Wilder (1956) | A Grand Night for Swinging (1957) |

New Music of Alec Wilder is an album by American jazz guitarist Mundell Lowe and his orchestra featuring compositions by Alec Wilder recorded in 1956 for the Riverside label.

== Reception ==
Professional ratings
Review scores
| Source | Rating |
|---|---|
| Allmusic | 3/5 stars |

Allmusic awarded the album 3 stars with its review by Scott Yanow calling it "A nice vehicle for an 11-piece group".

== Track listing ==
All compositions by Alec Wilder

1. "Suggestion for Bored Dancers" - 1:48
2. "She Never Wore Makeup" - 3:42
3. "What Happened Last Night?" - 2:08
4. "Walk Softly" - 2:48
5. "Let's Get Together and Cry" - 2:34
6. "Mama Never Dug This Scene" - 1:31
7. "Pop, What's a Passacaglia?" - 2:25
8. "No Plans" - 2:38
9. "The Endless Quest" - 2:47
10. "Around the World in 2:34" - 2:35
11. "An Unrelenting Memory" - 3:13
12. "Tacet for Neurotics" - 2:12
- Recorded at Reeves Sound Studios in New York City on June 12, 1956 (tracks 3, 4, 9 & 12) June 19, 1956 (tracks 5, 7, 8 & 11) and July 3, 1956 (tracks 1, 2, 6 & 10)

== Personnel ==
- Mundell Lowe - guitar
- Joe Wilder - trumpet
- John Barrows, Jim Buffington - French horn
- Don Hammond - flute
- Jerry Roth - oboe
- Bernard Garfield (tracks 1–4, 6, 9, 10 & 12), Harold Goltzer (tracks 5, 7, 8 & 11) - bassoon
- Jimmy Carroll - clarinet, bass clarinet
- Trigger Alpert (tracks 3–5, 7–9, 11 & 12), Milt Hinton (tracks 1, 2, 6 & 10) - bass
- Ed Shaughnessy - drums
