= The Mundell Lowe Quartet =

Studio album by Mundell Lowe
- Released: 1955
- Recorded: August 27 and October 4, 1955
- Studio: Reeves Sound Studios, New York City
- Genre: Jazz
- Length: 36:07
- Label: Riverside
- Producer: Orrin Keepnews

Mundell Lowe chronology
The Mundell Lowe Quintet (1954)	The Mundell Lowe Quartet (1955)	Guitar Moods (1956)

The Mundell Lowe Quartet is an album by American jazz guitarist Mundell Lowe that was released in 1955 by Riverside Records.

== Reception ==
Professional ratings
Review scores
Source	Rating
AllMusic	4/5 stars
The Penguin Guide to Jazz Recordings	3/4 stars

At AllMusic, Scott Yanow gave the album four stars and said, "Most of this set is essentially straight ahead bebop with guitarist Mundell Lowe heard in top form".

== Track listing ==
No.	Title	Writer(s)	Length
1.	"Will You Still Be Mine?"	Matt Dennis, Tom Adair	5:31
2.	"I Guess I'll Have to Change My Plan"	Arthur Schwartz, Howard Dietz	4:31
3.	"I'll Never Be the Same"	Gus Kahn, Matty Malneck, Frank Signorelli	5:06
4.	"All of You"	Cole Porter	3:36
5.	"Yes Sir, That's My Baby"	Gus Kahn, Walter Donaldson	2:36
6.	"The Night We Called It a Day"	Matt Dennis, Tom Adair	3:32
7.	"Bach Revisited"	Dick Garcia, Mundell Lowe	2:57
8.	"Cheek to Cheek"	Irving Berlin	4:49
9.	"Far from Vanilla"	Mundell Lowe	3:29

== Personnel ==
- Mundell Lowe – guitar
- Dick Hyman – piano, organ, celesta
- Trigger Alpert – bass
- Ed Shaughnessy – drums
