= Tony Scott (musician) =

American jazz clarinetist and arranger (1921–2007)

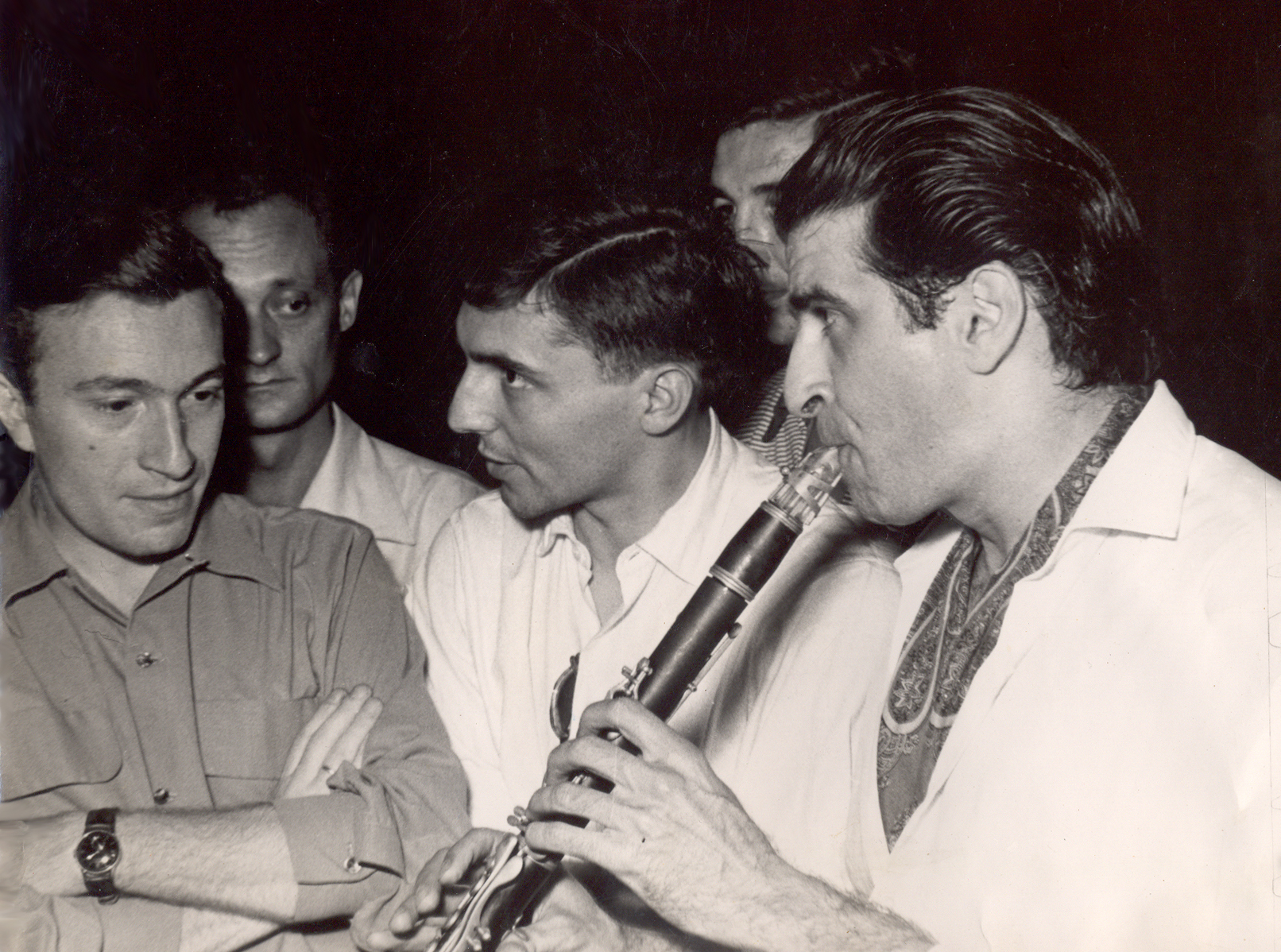
- Tony Scott (far right) with Serbian clarinetist Mihailo Živanović (far left) in 1951

Background information
- Born: Anthony Joseph Sciacca; June 17, 1921; Morristown, New Jersey, U.S.
- Died: March 28, 2007 (aged 85) Rome, Italy
- Genre: Jazz
- Occupations: Musician, composer, arranger, conductor
- Instruments: Clarinet, piano, saxophone
- Years active: 1946–2007

Tony Scott (born Anthony Joseph Sciacca; June 17, 1921 – March 28, 2007) was an American jazz clarinetist, arranger, composer, bandleader, saxophonist and piano player with an interest in folk music around the world. For most of his career he was held in high esteem in new-age music circles because of his involvement in music linked to Asian cultures and to meditation.

== Biography ==
Born in Morristown, New Jersey, United States, Scott attended Juilliard School from 1940 to 1942. In the 1950s he worked with Sarah Vaughan and Billie Holiday. He also had a young Bill Evans and Paul Motian as sidemen on several albums released between 1957 and 1959. He won the DownBeat critics poll for clarinetist in 1955, 1957, 1958 and 1959. He was known for a more "cool" style on the instrument than his peer Buddy DeFranco, who often played a more aggressive bebop style.

Despite this, he remained relatively little-known, as the clarinet had been in eclipse in jazz since the emergence of bebop. In 1959, he left New York City, where he had been based, and abandoned the United States for a time. In the 1960s, he toured South, East, and Southeast Asia. This led to his playing in a Hindu temple, spending time in Japan, and releasing Music for Zen Meditation in 1964 for Verve Records. In 1960 a DownBeat poll for Japan saw readers there name him best clarinetist while the United States preferred Buddy DeFranco. He did a Japanese special on Buddhism and jazz, although he continued to work with American jazz musicians and played at the Newport Jazz Festival in 1965. In the years following that he worked in Germany, Africa, and at times South America.

He settled in Italy in the 1970s, working with Italian jazz musicians such as Franco D'Andrea and Romano Mussolini. He also played the part of a Sicilian-American Mafia boss in Glauber Rocha's film Claro (1975). In later years he began showing an interest in electronica and, in 2002, his Hare Krishna was remixed by King Britt as a contribution to Verve Remixed.

In 2010, a documentary film by the Italian director Franco Maresco about the life of Scott was released, titled Io sono Tony Scott, ovvero come l'Italia fece fuori il più grande clarinettista del jazz (English: I am Tony Scott. The Story of How Italy Got Rid of the Greatest Jazz Clarinetist).

He died of prostate cancer in Rome at the age of 85.

== Discography ==
=== As leader ===
- 1953: Tony Scott Quartet, Complete Brunswick Sessions
- 1955: Scott's Fling (RCA Victor)
- 1956: Both Sides of Tony Scott (RCA Victor)
- 1956: The Touch of Tony Scott (RCA Victor)
- 1957: The Complete Tony Scott (RCA Victor)
- 1957: The Modern Art of Jazz (Seeco)
- 1957: Free Blown Jazz (Carlton)
- 1957: "Magic Clarinet / The Jazz Charmer" (Perfect) reissued in 1959 as Clarinette enchantée (FR) - My Kind of Jazz (US)
- 1957: Tony Scott Swinging in Sweden (RCA) with Rune Öfwerman trio
- 1957: Tony Scott in South Africa (RCA, Teal, South Africa)
- 1957: Tony Scott In Concert, with Horst Jankowski trio (in Ljubljana) (live recording released in 1990)
- 1958: South Pacific (ABC Paramount)
- 1958: 52nd Street Scene by Tony Scott and The All Stars (Coral)
- 1959: Golden Moments also as I'll Remember (Muse) (club live recording released in 1985)
- 1959: Sung Heroes (Sunnyside) (released in 1986)
- 1960: Gypsy (Signature)
- 1964: Music for Zen Meditation (Verve)
- 1967: Tony Scott (LPR) (Verve)
- 1967: Djanger Bali by Tony Scott and the Indonesian All Stars (MPS)
- 1968: Music for Yoga Meditation and Other Joys (Verve [1972])
- 1972: Music For Voodoo Meditation (Verve)
- 1973: Manteca (Sonet Records)
- 1977: Meditation by Tony Scott featuring Jan Akkerman (Polydor)
- 1978: Boomerang by Tony Scott & The Traditional Jazz Studio (Supraphon)
- 1981: Rozhovory by Tony Scott, Jiri Stivin & Rudolf Dasek (Supraphon)
- 1984: African Bird (Soul Note)
- 1988: Astral Meditation: Voyage into a Black Hole - Part 1 (Core)
- 1988: Astral Meditation: Voyage into a Black Hole - Part 2 - Astrala (Core)
- 1988: Astral Meditation: Voyage into a Black Hole - Part 3 - Astrobo (Core)
- 1989: Lush Life (Core)
- 2004: Tony Scott & The Mario Rusca Trio - The Old Lion Roars (GMG Music by Saar Records)
- 2007: Talkingmoods
- 2007: A Jazz Life
- 2013: Love Transfusion

=== As sideman ===
With Trigger Alpert

- Trigger Happy! (Riverside, 1956)

With Shirley Bunnie Foy

- Shirley Bunnie Foy (60th Anniversary) (MAP Golden Jazz, 2013)

With John Lewis

- The Modern Jazz Society Presents a Concert of Contemporary Music (Norgran, 1955)

With Mundell Lowe

- Porgy & Bess (RCA Camden, 1958)
- TV Action Jazz! (RCA Camden, 1959)

With Carmen McRae

- Carmen McRae (Bethlehem, 1954)

With the Metronome All-Stars

- Metronome All-Stars 1956 (Clef, 1956)

With Max Roach

- It's Christmas Again (Soul Note, 1984)

With Ben Webster

- Music for Loving (Norgran, 1954)

With Masahiko Togashi

- Masahiko Togashi - Tony Scott 1959 (Studio Songs, 2015, from a 1960 live broadcast)
