= Porgy & Bess (Mundell Lowe album) =

Studio album by Mundell Lowe and his All Stars
- Released: 1958
- Recorded: July 16–17 & October 3, 1958; New York City
- Genre: Jazz
- Length: 32:49
- Labels: RCA Camden; CAL-490

Mundell Lowe chronology
A Grand Night for Swinging (1957)	Porgy & Bess (1958)	TV Action Jazz! (1959)

Porgy & Bess is an album by American jazz guitarist Mundell Lowe and his All Stars featuring their interpretations of the George Gershwin folk opera Porgy and Bess recorded in 1958 for the RCA Camden label.

== Reception ==
Professional ratings
Review scores
Source	Rating
Allmusic	4/5 stars

Allmusic awarded the album 4 stars with its review by Scott Yanow stating, "Lowe's arrangements are colorful and swinging, doing justice to the music while turning the familiar themes into jazz".

== Track listing ==
All compositions by George Gershwin

1. "Summertime" - 4:46
2. "Bess, You Is My Woman Now" - 3:05
3. "I Loves You, Porgy" - 4:57
4. "I Got Plenty O' Nuttin'" - 2:50
5. "Oh Bess, Oh Where's My Bess?" - 2:18
6. "Red Headed Woman" - 2:22
7. "My Man's Gone Now" - 3:24
8. "It Takes a Long Pull to Get There" - 2:46
9. "It Ain't Necessarily So" - 3:11
10. "There's a Boat Dat's Leavin' Soon for New York" - 3:10

== Personnel ==
- Mundell Lowe - guitar
- Art Farmer - trumpet (tracks 1, 2, 4 & 6–9)
- Don Elliott - mellophone, vibraphone (tracks 1, 2, 4 & 6–9)
- Tony Scott - clarinet, baritone saxophone (tracks 1, 2, 4 & 6–9)
- Ben Webster - tenor saxophone (tracks 1, 2, 4 & 6–9)
- George Duvivier - bass
- Osie Johnson - drums (tracks 1, 2, 4 & 6–9)
- Ed Shaughnessy - drums, vibraphone (tracks 3, 5 & 10)
