= Blues and Other Shades of Green =

Studio album by Urbie Green
- Released: 1955
- Recorded: October 12, 1955
- Studios: Van Gelder Studio, Hackensack, NJ
- Genre: Jazz
- Length: 32:21
- Labels: ABC-Paramount; ABC-101
- Producer: Creed Taylor

Coleman Hawkins chronology
Urbie: East Coast Jazz Series No. 6 (1955)	Blues and Other Shades of Green (1955)	All About Urbie Green and His Big Band (1956)

Blues and Other Shades of Green is an album by trombonist Urbie Green which was recorded in 1955 and released on the ABC-Paramount label.

== Reception ==
Professional ratings
Review scores
Source	Rating
AllMusic	3.5/5 stars
Disc	4/5 stars

Jason Ankeny of AllMusic states: "Blues and Other Shades of Green casts Urbie Green in a rare small-group setting, assembling a stellar quintet ... for a crisp, coolly efficient session that leaves just enough wiggle room to allow all of the individual contributors their moment in the spotlight. Green wields both the slide and the valve trombone here, and the simplicity of the arrangements affords his lovely, direct tone the perfect platform to shine".

== Track listing ==
All compositions by Urbie Green, except where noted.

1. "Reminiscent Blues" – 3:17
2. "Thou Swell" (Richard Rodgers, Lorenz Hart) – 3:20
3. "You Are Too Beautiful" (Rodger, Hart) – 4:21
4. "Paradise" (Nacio Herb Brown, Gordon Clifford) – 3:01
5. "Warm Valley" (Duke Ellington) – 2:47
6. "Frankie and Johnny" (Traditional) – 1:49
7. "One for Dee" – 2:45
8. "Limehouse Blues" (Philip Braham, Douglas Furber) – 2:02
9. "Am I Blue?" (Harry Akst, Grant Clarke) – 3:03
10. "Dirty Dan" – 2:45
11. "It's Too Late Now" (Alan Jay Lerner, Burton Lane) – 3:11

== Personnel ==
- Urbie Green – trombone, valve trombone
- Jimmy Raney – guitar
- Dave McKenna – piano
- Percy Heath – bass
- Kenny Clarke – drums
