= Mundell Lowe =

American jazz guitarist (1922–2017)

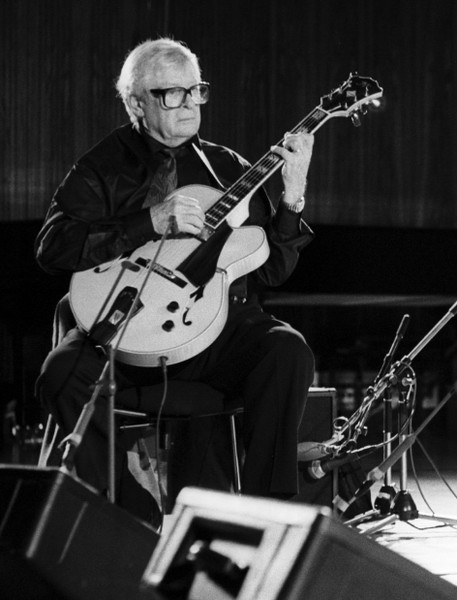
- Lowe in 2000

Background information
- Born: James Mundell Lowe; April 21, 1922; Shady Grove, Mississippi, U.S.
- Died: December 2, 2017 (aged 95) San Diego, California, U.S.
- Genre: Jazz
- Occupations: Musician, composer, conductor
- Instrument: Guitar
- Years active: 1946–2017
- Labels: RCA Victor, Riverside, RCA Camden, Fresh Sound, Nagel-Heyer

James Mundell Lowe (April 21, 1922 – December 2, 2017) was an American jazz guitarist who worked often in radio, television, and film, and as a session musician.

He produced film and TV scores in the 1970s, such as the Billy Jack soundtrack and music for Starsky and Hutch, and worked with André Previn's Trio in the 1990s.

== Early life, family and education ==
The son of a Baptist minister, Lowe grew up on a farm in Shady Grove, Smith County, Mississippi (near Laurel).

He started playing guitar when he was eight years old, with his father and sister acting as his first teachers.

== Career ==
When he was thirteen years old, he began running away from home to play in bands. Occasionally his father would find him, bring him home, and warn him about the dangers of whiskey. At sixteen, Lowe worked in Nashville on the Grand Ole Opry radio program. He was a member of the Jan Savitt orchestra before serving in the military during World War II.

At basic training, he became friends with John Hammond, who organized weekend jam sessions. He performed in an Army dance band while in Guadalcanal. After his discharge, he called Hammond, looking for work, and Hammond sent him to Ray McKinley. He spent two years with McKinley's big band in New York City. He joined the Benny Goodman orchestra, then worked intermittently for the next few years at Café Society and other clubs in New York.

In 1950, he was hired by NBC as a staff musician. He and Ed Shaughnessy were members of the Today Show band for over ten years. Lowe acted in an episode of the Armstrong Circle Theatre television show that included Walter Matthau and live music by Doc Severinsen.

On the weekends he played jazz, sometimes getting permission from NBC to leave for six-month periods. In the jazz world he played with Jimmy Dorsey and Tommy Dorsey, Bill Evans, Billie Holiday, Red Norvo, Charles Mingus, Charlie Parker, Sauter-Finegan Orchestra, and Lester Young. He composed and arranged for NBC. He was responsible for introducing pianist Bill Evans to record producer Orrin Keepnews, resulting in Evans's first recordings as a leader.

In 1965 he moved to Los Angeles and worked for NBC as a staff guitarist, composer, and arranger. He wrote music for the TV shows Hawaii Five-O, Starsky & Hutch, and The Wild Wild West, and the movies Satan in High Heels (1962), A Time for Killing (1967), Billy Jack (1971), Everything You Always Wanted to Know About Sex* (*But Were Afraid to Ask) (1972), Sidewinder 1 (1977) and Tarantulas: The Deadly Cargo (1977). He recorded with Carmen McRae and Sarah Vaughan. During the 1980s, he worked with André Previn, Tete Montoliu, and the Great Guitars. He was a teacher at the Guitar Institute of Technology, and taught Film Scoring at the Grove School of Music to students including film scorer Gary Stockdale. For several years, he was music director of the Monterey Jazz Festival.

During his career, he worked with Benny Carter, Miles Davis, Ella Fitzgerald, Johnny Hodges, Rahsaan Roland Kirk, Lee Konitz, Peggy Lee, Fats Navarro, Shirley Scott, Dinah Washington, and Ben Webster. In the later decades of his life he collaborated often with flautist Holly Hoffmann. At the age of 93, he released the album Poor Butterfly.

Lowe was married to singer Betty Bennett, his third wife, for 42 years. In his last years, the couple lived in San Diego. He died on December 2, 2017, at the age of 95.

== Discography ==
=== As leader ===
- The Mundell Lowe Quartet (Riverside, 1955)
- Guitar Moods (Riverside, 1956)
- New Music of Alec Wilder (Riverside, 1956)
- A Grand Night for Swinging (Riverside, 1957)
- Porgy & Bess (RCA Camden, 1959)
- TV Action Jazz! (RCA Camden, 1959)
- Themes from Mr. Lucky, The Untouchables and Other TV Action Jazz (RCA Camden, 1960)
- Satan in High Heels (Charlie Parker, 1961)/Blues for a Stripper (Charlie Parker, 1962)
- After Midnight (RCA Camden, 1963)
- California Guitar (Famous Door, 1973)
- Guitar Player (Dobre, 1977)
- Sweet 'n' Lovely 1 (Fresh Sound, 1991)
- Sweet 'n' Lovely 2 (Fresh Sound, 1991)
- Mundell's Moods (Nagel Heyer Records, 2000)

=== As sideman ===
With Steve Allen

- ...and All That Jazz (Dot, 1959)
- Steve Allen at the Roundtable (Roulette, 1959)

With Tony Bennett

- My Heart Sings (Columbia, 1961)
- Who Can I Turn To (CBS, 1965)

With Ruby Braff

- Holiday in Braff (Bethlehem, 1955)
- Easy Now (RCA Victor, 1959)
- You're Getting to Be a Habit with Me (Stere-o-Craft, 1959)

With Benny Carter

- Live and Well in Japan! (Pablo, 1978)
- Elegy in Blue (MusicMasters, 1994)

With Chris Connor

- Chris Connor Sings the George Gershwin Almanac of Song (Atlantic, 1957)
- I Miss You So (Atlantic, 1957)
- Chris Craft (Atlantic, 1958)
- Witchcraft (Atlantic, 1959)
- At the Village Gate (FM, 1963)

With Carmen McRae

- Carmen McRae (Bethlehem, 1954)
- Blue Moon (Decca, 1956)
- Birds of a Feather (Decca, 1958)
- Carmen McRae Sings Lover Man and Other Billie Holiday Classics (Philips, 1962)
- The Complete Ralph Burns Sessions (New York 1955, 1958) (Phoenix Records, 2012)

With André Previn

- Uptown (Telarc, 1990)
- Old Friends (Telarc, 1992)
- What Headphones? (Angel, 1993)
- André Previn and Friends Play Show Boat (Deutsche Grammophon, 1995)
- Jazz at the Musikverein (Verve, 1997)

With Sammy Davis Jr.

- Mood to Be Wooed (Decca, 1958)
- Try a Little Tenderness (Decca, 1965)

With Don Elliott

- Music for the Sensational Sixties (Design, 1958)
- Counterpoint for Six Valves (Riverside, 1959)

With Morgana King

- With a Taste of Honey (Mainstream, 1964)
- A Taste of Honey (Mainstream, 1971)

With Charlie Parker

- "Bird" Is Free (Charlie Parker Records, 1961)
- Parker Plus Strings (Charlie Parker Records, 1983)

With Felicia Sanders

- That Certain Feeling (Decca, 1958)
- I Wish You Love (Time, 1960)
- Felicia Sanders (Time, 1964)

With Tony Scott

- Both Sides of Tony Scott (RCA Victor, 1956)
- The Touch of Tony Scott (RCA Victor, 1956)
- Gypsy (Fresh Sound, 1987)

With Jack Sheldon

- Singular (Beez, 1980)
- Playin' It Straight (M&K, 1981)

With Creed Taylor

- Shock Music in Hi-Fi (ABC-Paramount, 1958)
- Ping Pang Pong the Swinging Ball (ABC-Paramount, 1960)

With Sarah Vaughan

- Sarah Vaughan in Hi-Fi (Columbia, 1955)
- After Hours (Roulette, 1961)

With Patty Weaver

- Feelings (SE, 1976)
- Patty Weaver Sings "As Time Goes By" (SE, 1976)

With others

- Louie Bellson, Louie Rides Again! (Percussion Power, 1974)
- Betty Bennett, The Song Is You (Fresh Sound, 1992)
- Bill Berry, Shortcake (Concord Jazz, 1994)
- Will Bradley & Johnny Guarnieri, Big Band Boogie (RCA, 1974)
- Les Brown, Digital Swing (Fantasy, 1987)
- Ruth Brown, Late Date with Ruth Brown (Atlantic, 1959)
- Russ Case, Dances Wild (Vik, 1957)
- Cher, Bittersweet White Light (MCA, 1973)
- Al Cohn, Son of Drum Suite (RCA Victor, 1961)
- Betty Comden, Richard Lewine, Remember These (Ava, 1963)
- Perry Como, Saturday Night with Mr. C (RCA Victor, 1958)
- Randy Crawford, Everything Must Change (Warner Bros., 1976)
- Jackie Davis, Most Happy Hammond (Capitol, 1958)
- Wild Bill Davis & Johnny Hodges, Con-Soul and Sax (RCA Victor, 1965)
- Wild Bill Davis, Free Frantic and Funky (RCA Victor, 1965)
- Blossom Dearie, Once Upon a Summertime (Verve, 1958)
- Ella Fitzgerald, Rhythm Is My Business (Verve, 1962)
- Jimmy Forrest, Soul Street (New Jazz, 1964)
- Aretha Franklin, The Tender, the Moving, the Swinging Aretha Franklin (Columbia, 1962)
- Benny Goodman, The New Benny Goodman Sextet (Philips, 1954)
- Marty Gold, Swingin' West (RCA Victor, 1960)
- Eydie Gorme, Blame It On the Bossa Nova (Columbia, 1963)
- Johnny Guarnieri, The Duke Again (Coral, 1957)
- Donna Hightower, Take One! (Capitol, 1959)
- Johnny Hodges & Wild Bill Davis, Blue Rabbit (Verve, 1964)
- Kenyon Hopkins & Creed Taylor, The Sound of New York (ABC-Paramount, 1959)
- Quincy Jones, Quincy Jones Explores the Music of Henry Mancini (Mercury, 1964)
- Deane Kincaide, The Solid South (Everest, 1959)
- Al Klink, Progressive Jazz (Grand Award, 1956)
- Peggy Lee, Somethin' Groovy! (Capitol, 1967)
- Barry Manilow, 2:00 AM Paradise Cafe (Arista, 1984)
- Herbie Mann, Herbie Mann Plays The Roar of the Greasepaint – The Smell of the Crowd (Atlantic, 1965)
- Marty Manning, The Twilight Zone (Columbia, 1961)
- Ray McKinley's Orchestra Arr. by Eddie Sauter, Borderline (Savoy, 1955)
- Helen Merrill, American Country Songs (Atco, 1959)
- Hugo Montenegro, Bongos and Brass (Time, 1960)
- Joe Mooney, The Happiness of Joe Mooney (Columbia, 1965)
- Michael Parks, You Don't Know Me (First American, 1981)
- Esther Phillips, And I Love Him (Atlantic, 1965)
- Arthur Prysock, Arthur Prysock Sings Only for You (Old Town, 1962)
- Johnnie Ray, Til Morning (Columbia, 1958)
- Della Reese, Let Me in Your Life (People, 1973)
- Chita Rivera, And Now I Sing! (Seeco, 1961)
- Spike Robinson, Reminiscin (Capri, 1992)
- Sauter-Finegan Orchestra, Straight Down the Middle (RCA Victor, 1958)
- Lalo Schifrin, New Fantasy (Verve, 1964)
- Jimmy Scott, Very Truly Yours (Savoy, 1984)
- Shirley Scott, For Members Only (Impulse!, 1964)
- Neil Sedaka, Rock with Sedaka (RCA Victor, 1959)
- Hymie Shertzer, All the King's Saxes (Disneyland, 1958)
- George Siravo, Seductive Strings by Siravo (Time, 1961)
- Rex Stewart & Peanuts Hucko, Dedicated Jazz (Jazztone, 1956)
- Ted Straeter, Ted Straeter's New York (Atlantic, 1955)
- Kiri Te Kanawa, Kiri Sidetracks (Philips, 1992)
- Cal Tjader, Gozame! Pero Ya... (Concord Jazz Picante, 1980)
- Ben Webster, The Soul of Ben Webster (Verve, 1960)
- Lee Wiley, A Touch of the Blues (RCA Victor, 1958)
