= Ed Shaughnessy =

American jazz drummer (1929–2013)

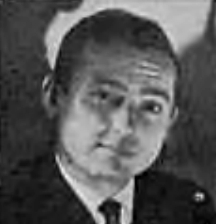
- Shaughnessy in an advertisement

Background information
- Born: Edwin Thomas Shaughnessy; January 29, 1929; Jersey City, New Jersey, U.S.
- Died: May 24, 2013 (aged 84) Calabasas, California
- Genres: Swing, bebop, jazz, big band
- Occupation: Musician
- Instrument: Drums
- Years active: 1940s–2011
- Formerly of: The Tonight Show Band
- Spouse: Ilene Woods (m. 1963; died 2010)

Edwin Thomas Shaughnessy (January 29, 1929 – May 24, 2013) was a swing music and jazz drummer long associated with Doc Severinsen and a member of The Tonight Show Band on The Tonight Show Starring Johnny Carson.

== Biography ==
Shaughnessy was born in Jersey City, New Jersey and grew up in the New York City area, working in the 1940s with George Shearing, Jack Teagarden, and Charlie Ventura. In the 1950s he worked in the Charlie Ventura, Benny Goodman and Tommy Dorsey bands. In the 1960s he played for Count Basie prior to joining The Tonight Show Band. He was the drummer on Bashin': The Unpredictable Jimmy Smith in 1962 which featured big band arrangements by Oliver Nelson, including the pop hit "Walk on the Wild Side" which peaked at #21 on the Billboard chart. Shaughnessy recorded extensively throughout his career and was known for his drum competitions with Buddy Rich.

Although best known as a big band drummer, Shaughnessy also performed small group work with Gene Ammons, Roy Eldridge, Billie Holiday, Mundell Lowe, Teo Macero, Charles Mingus, Shirley Scott, Jack Sheldon, Horace Silver, and many others. For several years Shaughnessy was a member of the house band at Birdland and other New York clubs. In the early 1970s he was doing similar work in Los Angeles and is credited with discovering Diane Schuur, whom he introduced at the 1976 Monterey Jazz Festival. Shaughnessy played in an early incarnation of the "Sesame Street" orchestra along with percussionist Danny Epstein, reed player Wally Kane, and, on occasion, guitarist Bucky Pizzarelli.

Shaughnessy was married to Ilene Woods, the original voice of Cinderella, who died in 2010. He died of a heart attack in Calabasas, California at the age of 84. He was cremated. He was survived by his son Daniel, his stepdaughter Stephanie and grandchildren. His other son James preceded him in death from a car accident in 1984.

== Discography ==
=== As sideman ===
With Trigger Alpert

- Trigger Happy! (Riverside, 1956)

With Gene Ammons

- The Soulful Moods of Gene Ammons (Moodsville, 1962)

With George Barnes

- Guitars Galore (Mercury Records, 1961)

With Count Basie

- Basie Swingin' Voices Singin' (ABC-Paramount, 1966) with the Alan Copeland Singers
- Broadway Basie's...Way (Command, 1966)
- Hollywood...Basie's Way (Command, 1967)
- Basie's Beat (Verve, 1967)
- Half a Sixpence (Dot, 1967)

With Tony Bennett

- Cloud 7 (Columbia, 1955)

With George Benson

- The Other Side of Abbey Road (A&M, 1970)

With Stephen Bishop

- Bish (ABC, 1978)

With Bob Brookmeyer

- The Dual Role of Bob Brookmeyer (Prestige, 1954)

With Gary Burton

- The Groovy Sound of Music (RCA, 1963)

With Teddy Charles

- New Directions (Prestige, 1953)
- Collaboration West (Prestige, 1953)
- Word from Bird (Atlantic, 1957)
- Jazz In The Garden At The Museum Of Modern Art (Warwick Records, 1960)

With Jimmy Forrest

- Soul Street (New Jazz, 1962)

With Dizzy Gillespie

- Cornucopia (Solid State, 1969)

With Jimmy Giuffre

- The Music Man (Atlantic, 1958)

With Honi Gordon

- Honi Gordon Sings (Prestige, 1962)

With Johnny Hodges

- Mess of Blues (Verve, 1964) with Wild Bill Davis

With Etta Jones

- From the Heart (Prestige, 1962)
- Lonely and Blue (Prestige, 1962)

With Quincy Jones

- Golden Boy (Mercury, 1964)

With Hubert Laws

- Crying Song (CTI, 1969)

With Peggy Lee

- Black Coffee (Decca, 1953)

With Mundell Lowe

- The Mundell Lowe Quartet (Riverside, 1955)
- Guitar Moods (Riverside, 1956)
- New Music of Alec Wilder (Riverside, 1956)
- Porgy & Bess (RCA Camden, 1958)
- TV Action Jazz! (RCA Camden, 1959)
- Themes from Mr. Lucky, the Untouchables and Other TV Action Jazz (RCA Camden, 1960)
- Satan in High Heels (soundtrack) (Charlie Parker, 1961)

With Johnny Mathis

- Johnny Mathis (Columbia, 1956)

With Mary Ann McCall

- Melancholy Baby (Coral, 1959)

With Kathy McCord

- Kathy McCord (CTI, 1970)

With Helen Merrill

- American Country Songs (Atco, 1959)

With Maria Muldaur

- Maria Muldaur (Reprise, 1973)

With Oliver Nelson

- Impressions of Phaedra (United Artists, 1962)
- Happenings with Hank Jones (Impulse!, 1966)

With Joe Newman

- Joe Newman with Woodwinds (Roulette, 1958)
- Joe Newman Quintet at Count Basie's (Mercury, 1961)

With Lalo Schifrin

- Between Broadway & Hollywood (MGM, 1963)

With Shirley Scott

- For Members Only (Impulse!, 1963)
- Roll 'Em: Shirley Scott Plays the Big Bands (Impulse!, 1966)

With Ed Summerlin

- Ring Out Joy (Avant-Garde, 1968)

With Clark Terry

- Color Changes (Candid, 1960)
- Clark Terry Plays the Jazz Version of All American (Moodsville, 1962)

With Cal Tjader

- Several Shades of Jade (Verve, 1963)
- Warm Wave (Verve, 1964)

With Chuck Wayne

- The Jazz Guitarist (Savoy, 1956)
