= Doc Severinsen =

American jazz trumpeter (born 1927)

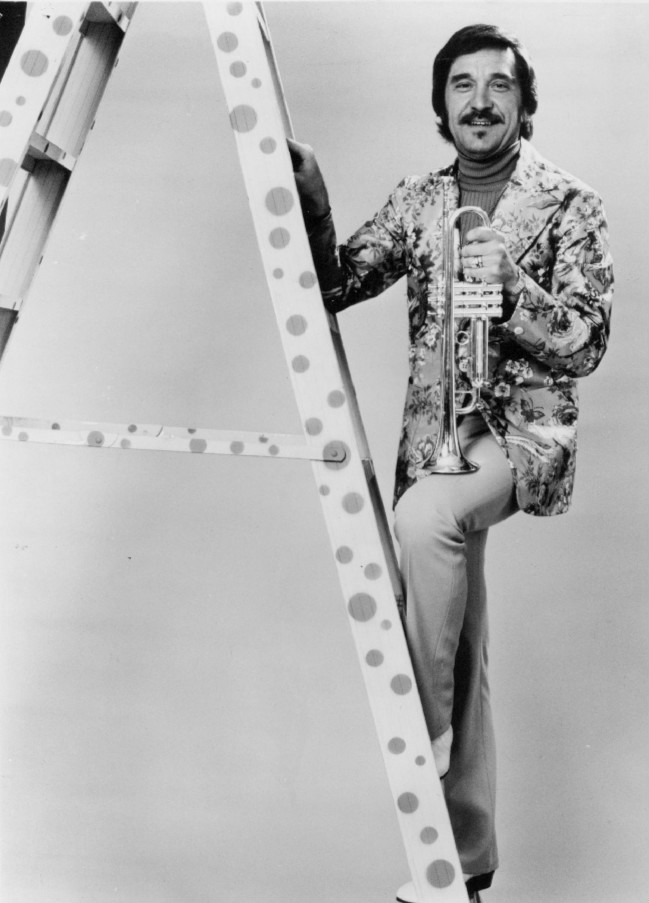
- Severinsen in a 1974 publicity photo for The Tonight Show

Background information
- Born: Carl Hilding Severinsen; July 7, 1927 (age 99); Arlington, Oregon, U.S.
- Genres: Jazz, swing, fusion, pop
- Occupations: Musician, bandleader
- Instrument: Trumpet
- Years active: 1946–2022
- Labels: Command, RCA Victor, Amherst, Telarc
- Formerly of: The NBC Orchestra
- Website: www.docseverinsen.com

Carl Hilding "Doc" Severinsen (born July 7, 1927) is an American retired jazz trumpeter who led the NBC Orchestra on The Tonight Show Starring Johnny Carson.

== Early life ==
Severinsen was born in Arlington, Oregon, to Minnie Mae (1897–1998) and Carl Severinsen (1898–1972). He was nicknamed Doc after his father, the only dentist in Arlington, who was born in Germany to a Danish father and a Swiss mother. Severinsen's father played violin and wanted him to play it, as well, but Severinsen wanted to play trombone. Because his arms were not long enough for trombone, and the small Arlington music store had none available, he settled for the cornet. A neighbor provided him with some lessons, while his father, tobacco in mouth, instructed him to spit out the notes like spitting tobacco. His mother threatened to spank him if he did not practice. Growing up, Severinsen idolized trumpeter and band leader Harry James.

Severinsen proved to have a knack for the instrument and was in a high-school band when he was seven. At 9, he won a state trumpet contest, at 12 he won the Music Teachers National Association’s national contest, at 13, he joined a multistate all-star band, and at 14, he auditioned for Tommy Dorsey, but was not hired. He started a quartet called the Blue Notes that performed at local dances.

Before graduating from high school, Severinsen was hired to go on the road with the Ted Fio Rito Orchestra. After graduation, he went on tour with Charlie Barnet, Tommy Dorsey, and Benny Goodman. He served in the Army during World War II. Severinsen was a member of Sam Donahue's band between 1946 and 1951. In 1946, he played trumpet on radio station KODL.

== The Tonight Show and other television appearances ==
In 1949, Severinsen landed a job as a studio musician for NBC, where he accompanied Steve Allen, Eddie Fisher, Dinah Shore, and Kate Smith, was a member of the original band for Tonight Starring Steve Allen, and was the soloist playing the closing theme. He left the show with Allen in 1957. The leader of the Tonight Show Band, Skitch Henderson, asked him to return as first-chair trumpeter in 1962 for what had become The Tonight Show Starring Johnny Carson, and five years later, after Milton Delugg, Severinsen was leading the band.

Under Severinsen's direction, the Tonight Show Band, styled the NBC Orchestra, became perhaps the best known big band in America. Severinsen became one of the most popular bandleaders, appearing almost every night on television. He led the band during commercials and while guests were introduced. He joked with Johnny Carson, the show's host, and developed an amusing habit of wearing gaudy clothing.

The show introduced a comic "Stump the Band" segment in which audience members called out the titles of obscure songs to see if the band could play them. Severinsen often cried "key of E", his signal for the band to strike up a Western theme, and then he would enthusiastically sing a country music-flavored nonsense song.

Severinsen substituted for Ed McMahon on occasions when Ed was absent as Carson's announcer and sidekick. He typically assumed this role when the show featured a guest host, which became increasingly frequent during the program's later years. Tommy Newsom was usually the band's substitute director when Severinsen was away from the show or filling in for McMahon. The sidekick role was omitted from the show when Leno guest hosted (it was discontinued altogether after Leno replaced Carson permanently). While Leno guest hosted for Carson, Severinsen typically introduced Leno and led the band while interacting with Leno in a similar manner to his interactions with Carson and McMahon.

Doc continued as bandleader until Carson's retirement in May 1992. Doc, along with Tommy Newsom and Ed Shaughnessy, appeared on the January 31, 2005, episode of Late Show with David Letterman performing "Here's That Rainy Day" (Johnny's favorite song) in honor of Mr. Carson, who had died eight days earlier. He appeared on Jimmy Fallon's Tonight Show in February 2015 when the show traveled to Los Angeles for a week. He played for the evening with The Roots. The appearance helped to promote his nationwide tour.

Through the 1970s to the 1990s, Severinsen also made appearances on Rowan & Martin's Laugh-In, Bonanza, The Bionic Woman, Cheers, and The Larry Sanders Show, among others.

== Recording career ==
During the early 1960s, Severinsen began recording big band albums, then moved toward instrumental pop music by the end of the decade. In the 1970s, he recorded jazz funk, then disco, finding hits with "Night Journey" and "I Wanna Be with You". His recording of "Melody (Aria) made the Adult Contemporary Top 40 in early 1977. He released an album with the jazz fusion group Xebron in 1985. During the next year, he recorded The Tonight Show Band with Doc Severinsen which won the Grammy Award for Best Large Jazz Ensemble Performance. After Carson retired in 1992, he toured with some of the band's members, including Conte Candoli, Snooky Young, Bill Perkins, Ernie Watts, Ross Tompkins, and Ed Shaughnessy.

Severinsen performed with high-school bands, in particular in the 1970s with Don Caneva's John Hersey High School Bands, which recorded four albums.

He performed the "Star-Spangled Banner" on at least three nationally telecast occasions; however, the first two renditions were marred by problems. When he accompanied actor Pat O'Brien, as O'Brien recited the national anthem at Super Bowl IV, the public address system at Tulane Stadium went dead for a minute, although viewers were unaware of it. Fifteen years later, when he performed the anthem again prior to the Marvin Hagler vs. Thomas Hearns fight, a giant US flag on the side of the Fantasy Tower at Caesars Palace overlooking the outdoor ring was not unfurled properly due to problems with the roping. He performed the anthem again, as well as "O Canada", at the 1989 Major League Baseball All-Star Game in Anaheim, California. With the game being played in the Los Angeles television and radio market, he was accompanied by the Tonight Show band. As of 2020, Severinsen and the NBC Orchestra's performance remains the most recent nonvocal rendition of the national anthem at the Midsummer Classic.

Severinsen is credited for co-writing the hit song "Stop and Smell the Roses" with Mac Davis, although both parties agree that Severinsen only came up with the title.

== Conducting and teaching ==
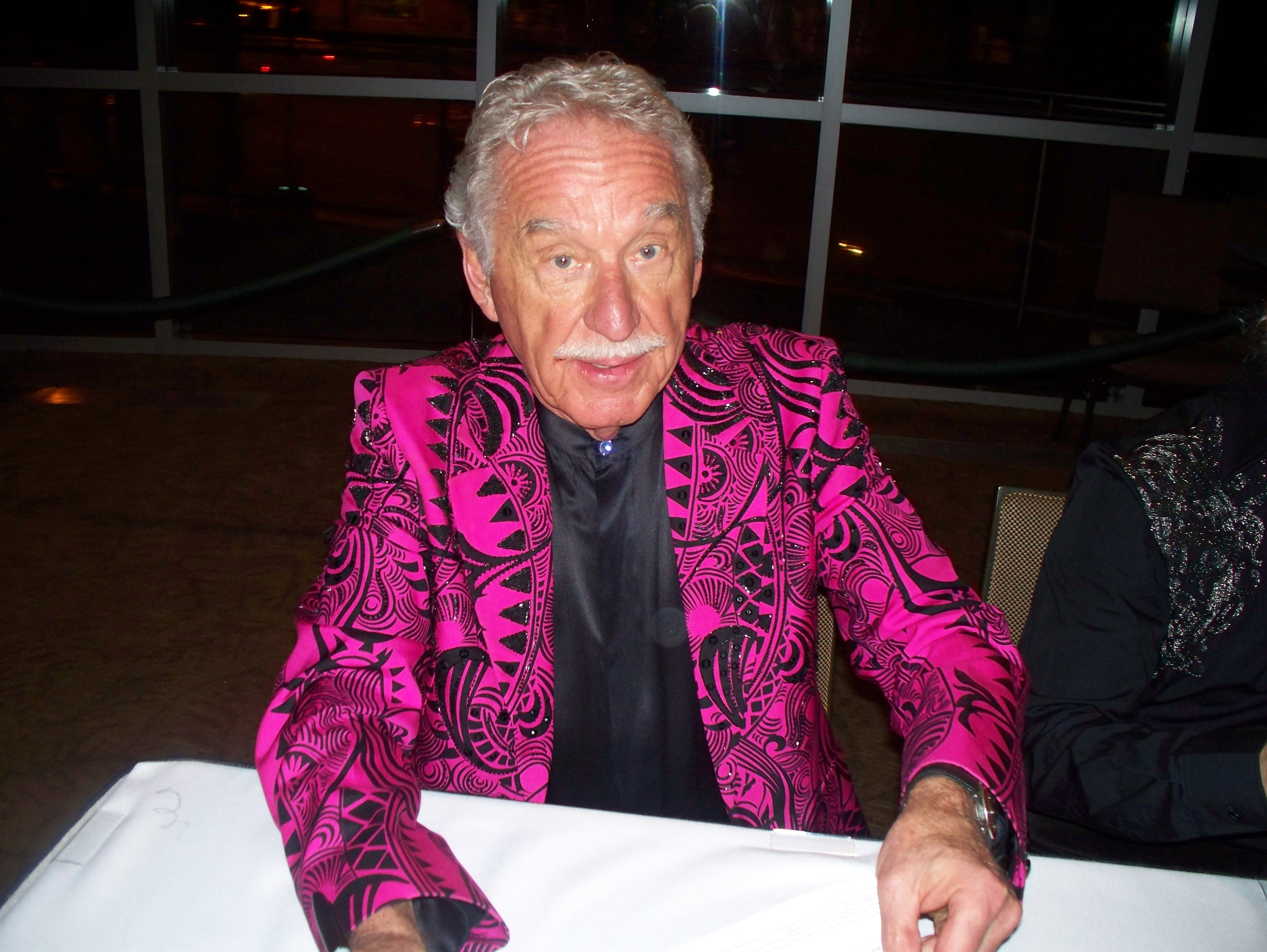
Severinsen in 2009

Severinsen was the principal pops conductor for several American orchestras during and after his time on The Tonight Show. His first position was with the Phoenix Symphony in 1983. He then held similar positions with the Buffalo Philharmonic Orchestra, Milwaukee Symphony Orchestra, and Minnesota Orchestra.

He retired from conducting in 2007 and was named Pops Conductor Emeritus in Milwaukee and Pops Conductor Laureate in Minnesota. Severinsen was also named distinguished visiting professor of music and Katherine K. Herberger Heritage Chair for Visiting Artists at Arizona State University School of Music in 2001 and 2002.

In 2014, he was inducted into the Scandinavian-American Hall of Fame.

Severinsen performed his final concert, accompanied by his San Miguel 5 group, on September 1, 2022, in Saratoga Springs, New York.

== Personal life ==
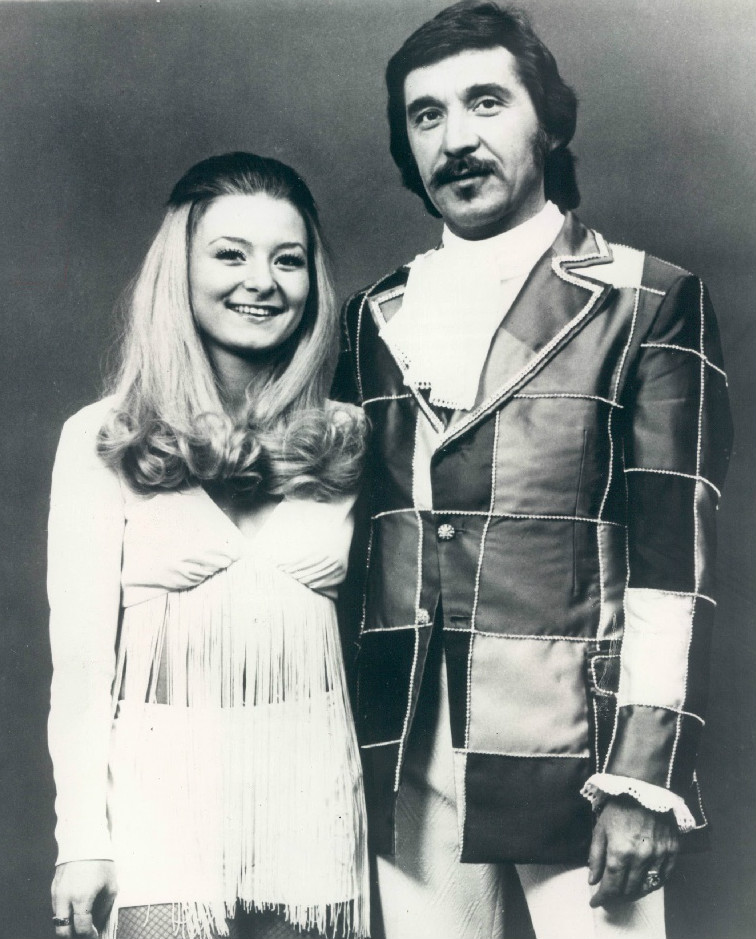
Severinsen with daughter Nancy, in 1974: Nancy was part of a vocal group called Today's Children, which often performed with him.

On June 23, 1949, Severinsen married Jane Simpson Frazer. They had four children before divorcing.

On August 7, 1964, Severinsen married Evonne Nyman. They had one child and were divorced in 1976.

In 1980, he married Emily Marshall, who was a television writer and producer and is an on-camera subject in a 2020 PBS documentary produced by American Masters titled Never Too Late: The Doc Severinsen Story that premiered April 2, 2021. They met when she was working as a secretary for The Tonight Show producer Fred de Cordova. In 1992, after The Tonight Show, Severinsen moved to Mexico with his wife, and formed a new band, the San Miguel Five. They divorced in 2006. Marshall died in 2023.

By 2013, Severinsen had been living in Tennessee for a few years, moving there to be closer to Cathy Leach, principal trumpeter with the Knoxville Symphony Orchestra and professor of trumpet at the University of Tennessee. As of 2021 Leach was Severinsen's "companion." In 2022, Leach was cited as his wife. Severinsen and Leach perform together.

Severinsen has been quoted as saying that he has been married four times.

Severinsen's children are Nancy, Cindy, Allen, Robin, and Judy. He has eight grandchildren, including Blaire and Gray Reinhard, who write and perform roots rock music together in various incarnations as Curtis & Reinhard and the Blaire Reinhard Band.

== Discography ==
- A String of Trumpets (Everest, 1960) with Billy Mure
- Tempestuous Trumpet (Command, 1961)
- The Big Band's Back in Town (Command, 1962)
- Torch Songs for Trumpet (Command, 1963)
- High, Wide & Wonderful (Command, 1965)
- Fever! (Command, 1966) (Pop No. 147)
- Command Performances (Command, 1966) (Pop No. 133)
- Live!: The Doc Severinsen Sextet (Command, 1967)
- Swinging & Singing (Command, 1967)
- The New Sound of Today's Big Band (Command, 1967)
- The Great Arrival (Command, 1968)
- Doc Severinsen & Strings (Command, 1968)
- Doc Severinsen's Closet (Command, 1970)
- Brass Roots (RCA Victor, 1971) (Pop No. 185)
- Sixteen Great Performances (ABC Records, 1971)
- Brass on Ivory (RCA Victor, 1972) (Pop No. 74) with Henry Mancini
- Doc (RCA Victor, 1972)
- Brass, Ivory & Strings (RCA Victor, 1973) (Pop No. 185) with Henry Mancini
- Rhapsody for Now! (RCA Victor, 1973)
- Trumpets & Crumpets & Things (ABC, 1973)
- Night Journey (Epic, 1976) (Pop No. 189)
- Brand New Thing (Epic, 1977)
- Live from Beautiful Downtown Burbank Tommy Newsom Featuring Doc Severinsen (Direct Disk Labs, 1978)
- Doc Severinsen and Friends (Everest, 1978)
- London Sessions (Firstline, 1980)
- Seductive Strings Featuring Doc Severinsen (Bainbridge, 1980)
- Doc Severinsen Plays Modern Trumpet Concertos (Firstline, 1981)
- And Xebron (Passport, 1985)
- Episodes (Pro-Arte, 1986)
- Ja-Da (MCA, 1986)
- The Tonight Show Band with Doc Severinsen (Amherst, 1986) (Pop No. 65)
- The Tonight Show Band with Doc Severinsen, Vol. II (Amherst, 1988)
- Facets (Amherst, 1988)
- The Big Band Hit Parade (Telarc, 1989)
- Trumpet Spectacular (Telarc, 1990)
- Once More...With Feeling! (Amherst, 1991)
- Merry Christmas from Doc Severinsen and The Tonight Show Orchestra (Amherst, 1991) (Pop No. 171)
- Unforgettably Doc (Telarc, 1992)
- Good Medicine (RCA/Bluebird, 1992)
- Lullabies and Goodnight (Critique, 1992)
- Two Sides of Doc Severinsen (The Right Stuff, 1993)
- Swingin' the Blues (Azica, 1999)
- From the Archives (Essential Media Group, 2012)
- Torch Songs for Trumpet (Command, 2025, digital/streaming reissue of 1963 release)

=== Doc Severinsen and the San Miguel Five ===
- El Ritmo De La Vida (Tejate, 2009) with Gil Gutierrez and Pedro Cartas
- En Mi Corazon (Tejate, 2010) with Gil Gutierrez and Pedro Cartas
- Oblivion (Bandcamp, 14 November 2013); (CD Baby, 2014); with Gil Gutierrez, Charlie Bisharat, Jimmy Branly, Kevin Thomas, Luis Conte, Otmaro Ruiz and Rene Camacho

=== As sideman ===
With Chris Connor

- 1959 Witchcraft
- 1961 Chris Connor Sings the George Gershwin Almanac of Song

With The Ray Charles Singers

- 1959 Sunrise Serenade (Decca)

With Urbie Green

- 1956 All About Urbie Green and His Big Band (ABC-Paramount)
- 1958 Let's Face the Music and Dance
- 1960 The Persuasive Trombone of Urbie Green
- 1963 Urbie Green & His Sextet

With Skitch Henderson and The Tonight Show Orchestra

- 1964 Skitch...Tonight!
- 1965 More Skitch Tonight!

With Gerry Mulligan

- 1961 Gerry Mulligan Presents a Concert in Jazz
- 1963 Gerry Mulligan '63

With Tito Puente

- 1957 Night Beat
- 1957 Top Percussion
- 1960 Tambó

With others

- 1956 The Swingin' Miss "D", Dinah Washington
- 1957 Dinah Washington Sings, Fats Waller
- 1957 Stormy Weather, Lena Horne
- 1958 Steve Allen at the Roundtable, Steve Allen
- 1958 United Nations, Toshiko Akiyoshi
- 1959 Late Date with Ruth Brown, Ruth Brown
- 1959 More Charlie Barnet, Charlie Barnet
- 1959 New York, N.Y., George Russell
- 1959 Plays Gerry Mulligan Arrangements, Gene Krupa
- 1961 Gloomy Sunday and Other Bright Moments, Bob Brookmeyer
- 1961 The Jazz Version of "How to Succeed in Business without Really Trying", Gary McFarland
- 1961 Into the Hot, Gil Evans
- 1961 Memories Are Made of This, Ray Conniff
- 1961 Perceptions, Dizzy Gillespie
- 1962 Bashin': The Unpredictable Jimmy Smith, Jimmy Smith
- 1962 All the Sad Young Men, Anita O'Day
- 1962 Big Bags (Riverside, 1962), Milt Jackson
- 1962 Big Band Bossa Nova, Stan Getz
- 1962 Big Noise from Winnetka, Bob Haggart
- 1962 It's About Time, Joe Morello
- 1962 Joe Morello, Joe Morello
- 1962 Off Beat Percussion, Don Lamond
- 1962 Spanish Guitar, Tony Mottola
- 1962 Vibrations, Enoch Light
- 1963 Right Here, Right Now, Billy Taylor
- 1964 Dimension "3", Enoch Light
- 1974 The Hi-De-Ho Man, Cab Calloway
- 1987 Jazz, Tony Bennett
- 1988 Big Band Hit Parade, Erich Kunzel
- 1989 Swinging West, Steve Lawrence
- 1994 Eartha-quake, Eartha Kitt
- 1994 Loose Walk, Sonny Stitt
- 1997 Jammin' with Ben Webster, Ben Webster
- 1999 Some Cats Know, Connie Evingson

Media offices
Preceded by Milton DeLugg	The Tonight Show bandleader 1967–1992	Succeeded by Branford Marsalis
