= The Children of Sanchez =

The Children of Sanchez may refer to:

- The Children of Sanchez (book), 1961 book by American anthropologist Oscar Lewis
- The Children of Sanchez (film), 1979 American drama film based on the book
- Children of Sanchez (album), album by jazz artist Chuck Mangione, soundtrack for the film
