= An Evening of Magic, Live at the Hollywood Bowl =

1979 live album by Chuck Mangione

Live album by Chuck Mangione
- Released: 1979
- Recorded: July 16, 1978
- Venue: Hollywood Bowl (Los Angeles)
- Genre: Jazz
- Length: 101:19
- Label: Hip-O Records; A&M Records

Chuck Mangione chronology
Feels So Good (1977)	An Evening of Magic, Live at the Hollywood Bowl (1979)	70 Miles Young (1978)

Professional ratings
Review scores
Source	Rating
AllMusic	3/5 stars

An Evening of Magic, Live at the Hollywood Bowl is Chuck Mangione's second live album. It was released by A&M Records and re-released by Hip-O Records on CD. In addition to Mangione on flugelhorn and electric piano, it features his studio and touring band at the time, including the musicians Charles Meeks on bass guitar, Grant Geissman on guitar, James Bradley Jr. on drums, and Chris Vadala on several woodwind instruments. The band is accompanied on most tracks by a 70-piece orchestra.

Mangione played many of his popular songs such as "Feels So Good", "Main Squeeze" and "Land of Make Believe" and he also debuted music from his then forthcoming album, Children of Sanchez.

The album was nominated for the Grammy Award for Best Pop Instrumental Performance.

== Track listing ==
All songs written by Chuck Mangione except where noted:

Disc One
No.	Title	Length
1.	"Feels So Good"	9:17
2.	"The XIth Commandment"	6:37
3.	"Chase the Clouds Away"	9:38
4.	"Hill Where the Lord Hides"	5:26
5.	"Doin' Everything with You"	7:38
6.	"Love the Feelin'"	7:23
7.	"I Get Crazy"	4:15

Disc Two
No.	Title	Writer(s)	Length
1.	"Land of Make Believe"		9:09
2.	"Hide and Seek (Ready or Not Here I Come)"		8:39
3.	"The Day After (Our First Night Together)"		7:38
4.	"Children of Sanchez (Main Theme)"		6:49
5.	"B'Bye"		5:06
6.	"Children of Sanchez (Finale)"		3:55
7.	"Main Squeeze"	Chuck Mangione, Bob Mann, Don Grolnick, John Tropea, Ralph MacDonald, Richard Johnson, Rubens Bassini, Tony Levin	6:35
8.	"Feels So Good (Encore)"		3:14
Total length:			101:19
