= Give It All You Got =

Single by Chuck Mangione

from the album Fun and Games
- B-side: "B'Bye"
- Released: 1980
- Recorded: 1979
- Genre: Jazz funk
- Length: 3:55 (single edit); 6:16 (album version)
- Label: A&M
- Songwriter: Chuck Mangione
- Producer: Chuck Mangione

Chuck Mangione singles chronology
| "Land of Make Believe" (1979) | "Give It All You Got" (1980) | "Fun and Games" (1980) |

"Give It All You Got" is an instrumental song from 1980 by the American flugelhorn player Chuck Mangione. It was composed and produced by Mangione, and can be found on his 1980 album Fun and Games, which also includes a slower-paced version of the same selection, played in C minor (as opposed to the original, which is played in B-flat minor), titled "Give It All You Got, But Slowly."

== Composition and recording ==
=== Origins ===
The song was originally featured as the official theme of the 1980 Winter Olympics, held in Lake Placid, New York. The TV network ABC had used Mangione's recordings four years earlier during their coverage of the 1976 Summer Olympics, and the then President of ABC Sports, Roone Arledge, asked the musician to create the theme song for the Winter games. Mangione also performed the song live at the closing ceremonies on February 24. The C minor version was also used for sign-off music on CBUT Vancouver and WFLD Chicago in the early-to-mid 1980s. It was also used by WJAR-TV in Providence, Rhode Island in their 1986 sign-off.

Released as a single just before the Olympics, "Give It All You Got" peaked at No. 18 on the Billboard Hot 100 chart in March 1980. The song charted at No. 32 on the Billboard R&B chart and spent three non-consecutive weeks atop the Billboard adult contemporary chart. This was Mangione's second single to reach No. 1 on the AC chart, following "Feels So Good" from 1978. In Canada it reached No. 36 on the Top 100 and No. 2 on the AC charts.

The song was nominated for a Grammy Award in 1981 in the category Best Instrumental Composition, losing out to composer John Williams and his score to the film The Empire Strikes Back.

Mangione has described the process of composing the instrumental's music, saying that his "vision was to think about the athletes and their efforts to do their best now. They're giving it all they've got. And we almost got to be like the athletes because we also got to perform the song at the ceremonies for a worldwide audience."

== Personnel ==
- Chuck Mangione: flugelhorn, electric piano
- Chris Vadala: sax
- Grant Geissman: electric guitar
- Charles Meeks: bass
- James Bradley, Jr.: drums

== See also ==
- Jazz funk
- List of number-one adult contemporary singles of 1980 (U.S.)
