= Sidestreet =

- Genre: Drama
- Created by: John Saxton; Geoffrey Gilbert
- Starring: Sean McCann; Stephen Markel; Donnelly Rhodes
- Country of origin: Canada
- Original language: English
- No. of seasons: 4
- No. of episodes: 32

Production
- Executive producers: John T. Ross (early episodes); Stanley Colbert (later episodes)
- Running time: 60 minutes

Original release
- Network: CBC Television
- Release: September 14, 1975 – November 12, 1978

Sidestreet is a Canadian television drama that aired Sundays on CBC from 1975 to 1978. It stars Sean McCann and Donnelly Rhodes as police working in Toronto.

== Background ==
Sidestreet succeeded The Collaborators as the CBC's main series drama. Program developers aimed to move Sidestreet away from the violence that The Collaborators had by focusing on protagonists who were community service officers instead of ordinary detectives. They aimed to concentrate on issues such as: blockbusting, strikebreaking, rape, poverty, and the problems of the elderly in the city, instead of major crimes.

During its run the programme crossed-over with the British police series Z-Cars, with actor John Swindells joining the cast as the character of Bowman, the same role he had previously played in Z-Cars.

== Cast ==
- Stephen Markel as St. Johnny Dias (season 1)
- Sean McCann as Insp. Alec Woodward (season 1)
- Donnelly Rhodes as Nick Raitt (seasons 2-4)
- Jonathan Welsh as Glenn Olsen (seasons 2-4)

== Episodes ==
=== Season 1 (1975) ===
No. overall	No. in season	Title	Directed by	Written by	Original release date
1	1	"The Hold Out"	Unknown	Unknown	September 14, 1975
2	2	"The Money-Go-Round"	Unknown	Unknown	September 21, 1975
3	3	"The Rebellion of Bertha MacKenzie"	Unknown	Unknown	September 28, 1975
4	4	"Perhaps in Dreams Old Man"	Unknown	Unknown	October 5, 1975
5	5	"Rape"	Unknown	Unknown	October 12, 1975
6	6	"Do You Know Where Your Children Are?"	Unknown	Unknown	October 19, 1975
7	7	"Strikebreaker"	Unknown	Unknown	October 26, 1975
8	8	"Playing the Game"	Unknown	Unknown	November 2, 1975

=== Season 2 (1976) ===
No. overall	No. in season	Title	Directed by	Written by	Original release date
9	1	"Line of Duty"	Unknown	Unknown	October 3, 1976
10	2	"The Right to Defend"	Unknown	Unknown	October 10, 1976
11	3	"Intimidation"	Unknown	Unknown	October 24, 1976
12	4	"Assault"	Unknown	Unknown	October 31, 1976
13	5	"Death Sentence"	Unknown	Unknown	November 7, 1976
14	6	"Rogue Cop"	Unknown	Unknown	November 14, 1976
15	7	"Till Death Do Us Part"	Unknown	Unknown	November 21, 1976

=== Season 3 (1977) ===
No. overall	No. in season	Title	Directed by	Written by	Original release date
16	1	"Saturday Night Special"	Unknown	Unknown	October 9, 1977
17	2	"Between Friends"	Unknown	Unknown	October 23, 1977
18	3	"Eighteen Hours to Kill"	Unknown	Unknown	October 30, 1977
19	4	"Sugar and Spice"	Unknown	Unknown	November 6, 1977
20	5	"Last of the Fall Guys"	Unknown	Unknown	November 13, 1977
21	6	"With This Ring"	Unknown	Unknown	November 27, 1977
22	7	"Once a Hero"	Unknown	Unknown	December 4, 1977
23	8	"Stakeout"	Unknown	Unknown	December 11, 1977
24	9	"A Case in Point"	Unknown	Unknown	December 18, 1977

=== Season 4 (1978) ===
No. overall	No. in season	Title	Directed by	Written by	Original release date
25	1	"Just Another Day"	Unknown	Unknown	September 24, 1978
26	2	"Holiday with Homicide"	Unknown	Unknown	October 1, 1978
27	3	"Big Brother"	Unknown	Unknown	October 8, 1978
28	4	"Les Gendarmes"	Unknown	Unknown	October 15, 1978
29	5	"Scorpio Rising"	Unknown	Unknown	October 22, 1978
30	6	"The Moneylender"	Unknown	Unknown	October 29, 1978
31	7	"Revenge"	Unknown	Unknown	October 5, 1978
32	8	"Vancouver Connection"	Unknown	Unknown	November 12, 1978

== Theme song ==
Jazz musician Chuck Mangione composed the show's theme song. The two-minute theme appears on his 1977 hit album Feels So Good.
