= Rochester Orchestra =

American orchestra

The Rochester Orchestra (RO) was an American orchestra based in the city of Rochester, New York that was active from 1912 to 1919. The orchestra was formed in 1912 as a restructuring of Mathias Dossenbach's Dossenbach Orchestra, which had been playing in the city of Rochester since 1900. When George Eastman formed the new Rochester Philharmonic Orchestra (RPO) in 1919 the RO was disbanded and many of its members became a part of the RPO.

== History ==
The Rochester Orchestra was originally known as the Dossenbach Orchestra, and it was founded by Hermann Dossenbach (1868 – January 28, 1946), one of four sons of German immigrant Mathias Dossenbach, in 1900, and had its first concert on February 5. By 1906, the orchestra expanded from 30 players to 60 players. In 1912, the Dossenbach Orchestra was reformed as the Rochester Orchestra, which was succeeded by the Rochester Philharmonic Orchestra.
