= List of Billboard Adult Contemporary number ones of 1980 =

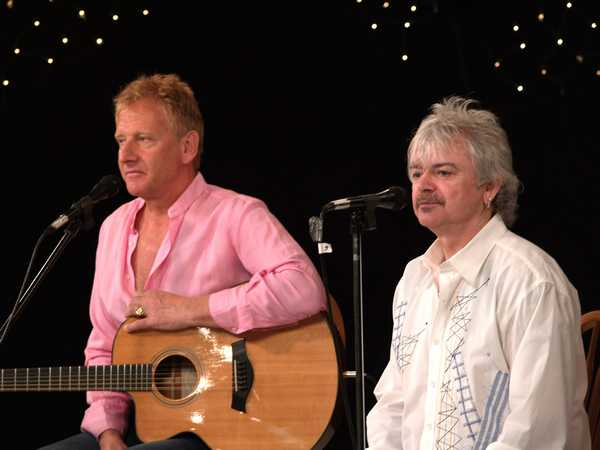
The British-Australian soft rock duo Air Supply (pictured in 2006) had two spells at number one with "Lost in Love".

In 1980, Billboard magazine published a chart ranking the top-performing songs in the United States in the adult contemporary music (AC) market. The chart, which in 1980 was published under the title Adult Contemporary, has undergone various name changes during its history but has again been published as Adult Contemporary since 1996. In 1980, 20 songs topped the chart based on playlists submitted by radio stations.

The first number one of the year was "Send One Your Love" by Stevie Wonder, which retained its position from the final chart of 1979, and held the top spot for the first two weeks of 1980. In the issue of Billboard dated January 19, it was replaced at number one by "Déjà Vu" by Dionne Warwick, who returned to the number one position in September with "No Night So Long" and was the only act to achieve more than one AC chart-topper in 1980. Solo vocalists dominated the top of the chart during the year: male soloists spent 21 weeks at number one and female soloists 20 weeks. The remainder of the year featured a duet between Teri DeSario and KC, the lead vocalist of KC and the Sunshine Band, and just two chart-toppers by groups. Three of the year's AC number ones also topped Billboard's pop singles chart, the Hot 100: "Woman in Love" by Barbra Streisand, Olivia Newton-John's "Magic", and "Lady" by Kenny Rogers. "Lady", written by Lionel Richie, was a triple chart-topper for Rogers, as it also reached number one on the Hot Country Singles listing.

Four songs tied for the longest unbroken run at number one during the year, each spending five weeks in the top spot. "Lost in Love" by Air Supply was the first to achieve the feat in April and May, and was immediately followed at the top of the chart by "The Rose" by Bette Midler, which held the position for the same length of time. Midler's song came from the film of the same name, in which she played a self-destructive rock star based loosely on Janis Joplin, and won the Golden Globe Award for Best Original Song. Later in the year two other female vocalists had five-week runs at number one: Newton-John with "Magic" and Streisand with "Woman in Love". "Lost in Love" by Air Supply also had a separate spell of a single week at number one, and its total of six weeks atop the chart was the most by a song during the year and meant that Air Supply had the highest total number of weeks in the top spot by an act in 1980. A second track to have two spells at number one was "Give It All You Got" by the jazz trumpeter Chuck Mangione, the official theme tune of the 1980 Winter Olympics. The final AC number one of the year was "More Than I Can Say" by the British vocalist Leo Sayer.

== Chart history ==
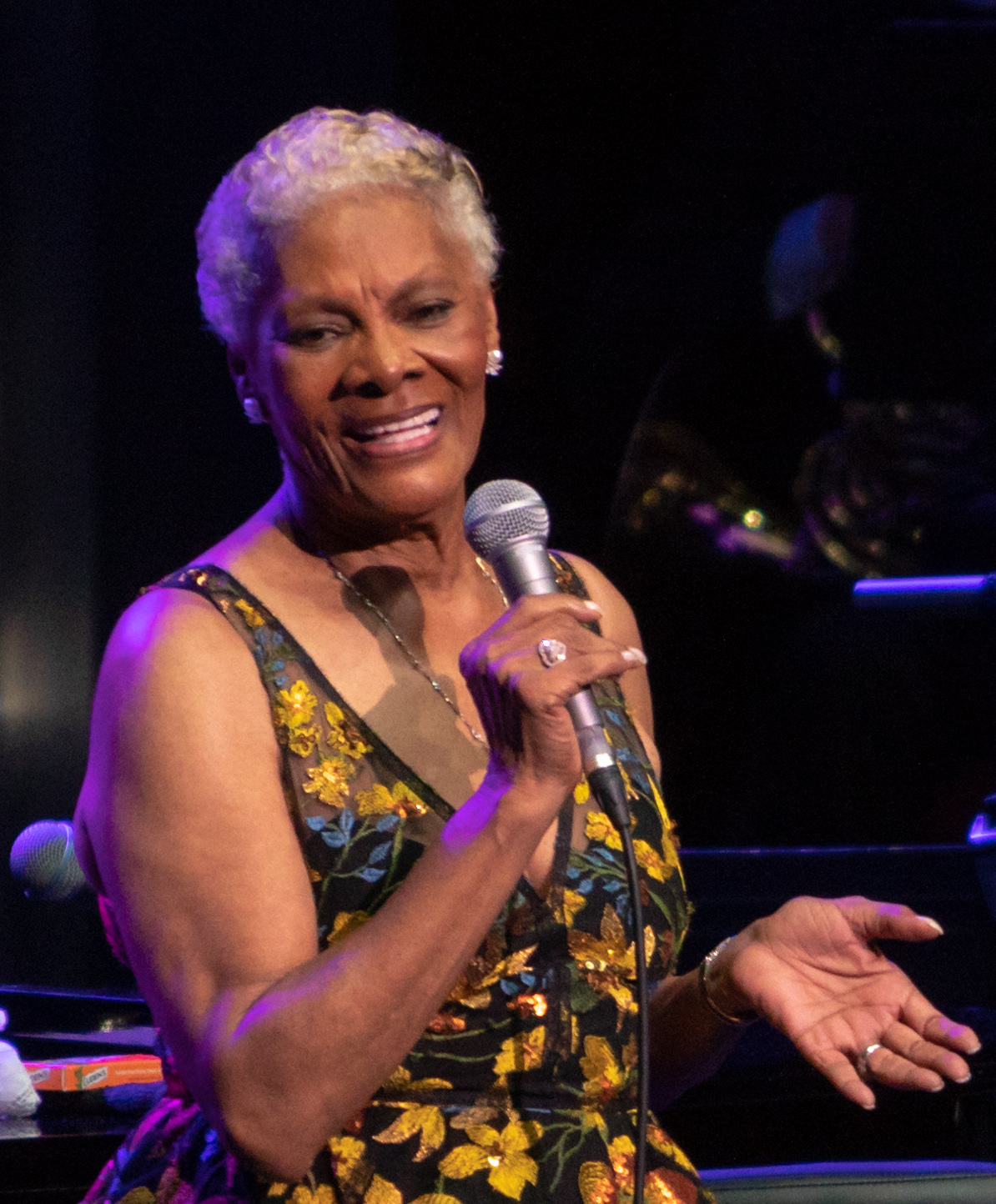
Dionne Warwick was the only act with more than one AC number one in 1980.

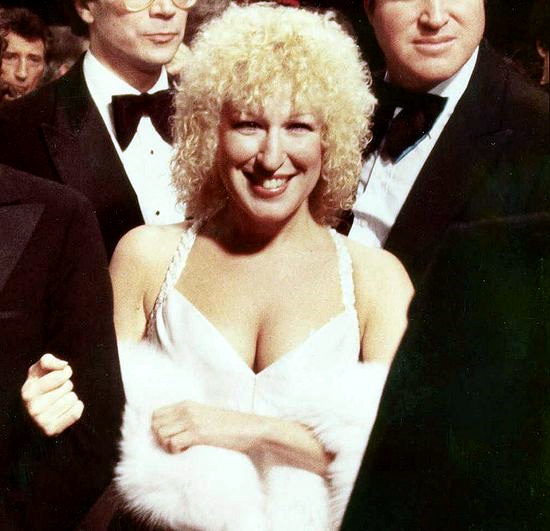
Bette Midler pictured at the premiere of the film The Rose, in which she starred. She topped the AC chart with the title song.

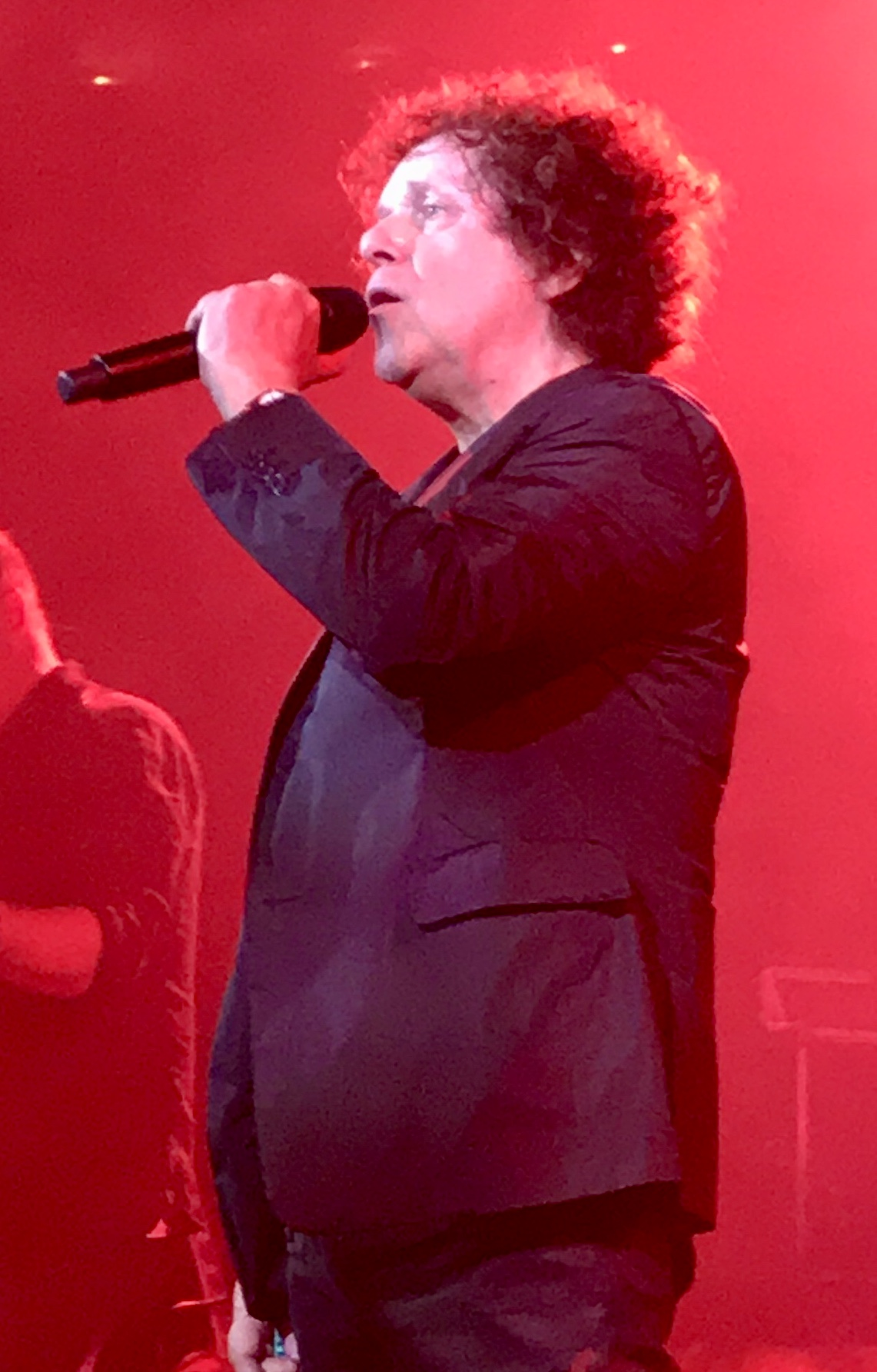
The British singer Leo Sayer ended the year at number one.

Chart history
Issue date	Title	Artist(s)	Ref.
January 5	"Send One Your Love"	Stevie Wonder	
January 12	"Send One Your Love"	Stevie Wonder	
January 19	"Déjà Vu"	Dionne Warwick	
January 26	"Yes, I'm Ready"	Teri DeSario with KC	
February 2	"Yes, I'm Ready"	Teri DeSario with KC	
February 9	"Longer"	Dan Fogelberg	
February 16	"When I Wanted You"	Barry Manilow	
February 23	"Give It All You Got"	Chuck Mangione	
March 1	"Daydream Believer"	Anne Murray	
March 8	"Give It All You Got"	Chuck Mangione	
March 15	"Give It All You Got"	Chuck Mangione	
March 22	"Lost in Love"	Air Supply	
March 29	"Three Times in Love"	Tommy James	
April 5	"Lost in Love"	Air Supply	
April 12	"Lost in Love"	Air Supply	
April 19	"Lost in Love"	Air Supply	
April 26	"Lost in Love"	Air Supply	
May 3	"Lost in Love"	Air Supply	
May 10	"The Rose"	Bette Midler	
May 17	"The Rose"	Bette Midler	
May 24	"The Rose"	Bette Midler	
May 31	"The Rose"	Bette Midler	
June 7	"The Rose"	Bette Midler	
June 14	"Little Jeannie"	Elton John	
June 21	"Little Jeannie"	Elton John	
June 28	"Let Me Love You Tonight"	Pure Prairie League	
July 5	"Let Me Love You Tonight"	Pure Prairie League	
July 12	"Let Me Love You Tonight"	Pure Prairie League	
July 19	"Magic"	Olivia Newton-John	
July 26	"Magic"	Olivia Newton-John	
August 2	"Magic"	Olivia Newton-John	
August 9	"Magic"	Olivia Newton-John	
August 16	"Magic"	Olivia Newton-John	
August 23	"Why Not Me"	Fred Knoblock	
August 30	"Why Not Me"	Fred Knoblock	
September 6	"Don't Ask Me Why"	Billy Joel	
September 13	"Don't Ask Me Why"	Billy Joel	
September 20	"No Night So Long"	Dionne Warwick	
September 27	"No Night So Long"	Dionne Warwick	
October 4	"No Night So Long"	Dionne Warwick	
October 11	"Woman in Love"	Barbra Streisand	
October 18	"Woman in Love"	Barbra Streisand	
October 25	"Woman in Love"	Barbra Streisand	
November 1	"Woman in Love"	Barbra Streisand	
November 8	"Woman in Love"	Barbra Streisand	
November 15	"Lady"	Kenny Rogers	
November 22	"Lady"	Kenny Rogers	
November 29	"Lady"	Kenny Rogers	
December 6	"Lady"	Kenny Rogers	
December 13	"Never Be the Same"	Christopher Cross	
December 20	"Never Be the Same"	Christopher Cross	
December 27	"More Than I Can Say"	Leo Sayer	
