= Friends and Love =

Friends & Love

Live album by Chuck Mangione
- Released: 1970
- Recorded: May 9, 1970
- Venues: Eastman Theatre, Rochester, New York
- Genre: Jazz
- Label: Mercury

Chuck Mangione chronology
| Spring Fever (1961) | Friends & Love (1970) | Together: A New Chuck Mangione Concert (1971) |

Professional ratings
Review scores
| Source | Rating |
|---|---|
| AllMusic | 4/5 stars |

Friends & Love...A Chuck Mangione Concert is a double album recorded live at the Eastman Theatre in Rochester, New York on May 9, 1970, and released by Mercury Records. It features Chuck Mangione on flugelhorn; the Rochester Philharmonic Orchestra conducted by Mangione; Don Potter; Bat McGrath; Gap Mangione; Stanley Watson; Marvin Stamm; Steve Gadd; and Gerry Niewood. Lyrics were written by Bat McGrath; orchestrations and arrangements were by Mangione.

Recorded by Grammy winning recording engineer Mick Guzauski.

Live Audio by renowned audio engineer Dick Zicari

The album was nominated for a Grammy Award in 1971.

The album "blended jazz, rock, folk and classical elements." The first track, "Hill Where the Lord Hides", was subsequently released as a single and appeared on the Billboard Hot 100 in 1971.

== Track listing ==
1. "Hill Where the Lord Hides" (7:12)
2. "The Feel of a Vision" (8:26)
3. "Songs from the Valley of the Nightingale" (6:51)
4. "And In the Beginning" (9:41)
5. "Friends & Love" (24:45)
6. "Friends & Love Encore" (5:52)

== Personnel ==
- Chuck Mangione - flugelhorn, conductor, arrangements, orchestration
- Rochester Philharmonic Orchestra
- Don Potter - guitar, voice
- Bat McGrath - guitarrón, voice
- Gap Mangione - electric piano
- Stanley Watson - guitar
- Al Porcino, Marvin Stamm, Paul McRae, Richard F. Jones, Vincent DiMartino - trumpet
- Chris Vadala, Larry Covelli - tenor saxophone
- Gerry Niewood - soprano saxophone, alto saxophone, flute
- Ned Corman - baritone saxophone, flute, alto flute
- Steve Gadd - drums
- Tony Levin - electric bass
- Bill Cahn, Bob Becker - percussion
- Eileen Malone - harp
- Brad Warnaar, George Nemeth, Milan Yancich, Morris Secon - horns
- Bill Reichenbach, David Richey, George J. Osborn, Tony Dechario - trombone
- Edward De Matteo, Michael Leiter, Oscar Zimmermann, Robert Zimmermann - string bass
- Hrant Tatian, Peter Wukovitz, Robert E. Taylor, Sylvia Thelen - cello
- Michael Webster, Stanley Gaulke - clarinet
- Katherine T. Levy, Nancy Webster - flute
- Paul F. Philips, Stephen Paulson - bassoon
- Jonathan Parkes, Robert Sprenkle - oboe
- Cherry Beauregard - tuba
- John Beck - timpani
- Abram Boone, Harry Schatz, Herbert Brill, Judit M. Hradetzky, Lorene C. Field, Sharon Laird, Shirley Reynolds, Carol Tatian, Cynthia Hammer, Herman Surasky, Loraine Messick, Ralph Rozzi, Yong Ki Ahn - violin
- Alfred L. Drucker, Elizabeth Weiss, Herman Rudin, Minna Shklar, Thomas A. Dumm - viola
- Dick Zicari - live sound
- Mick Guzauski,- Recording Engineer
