= Gerry Niewood =

American jazz musician (1943–2009)

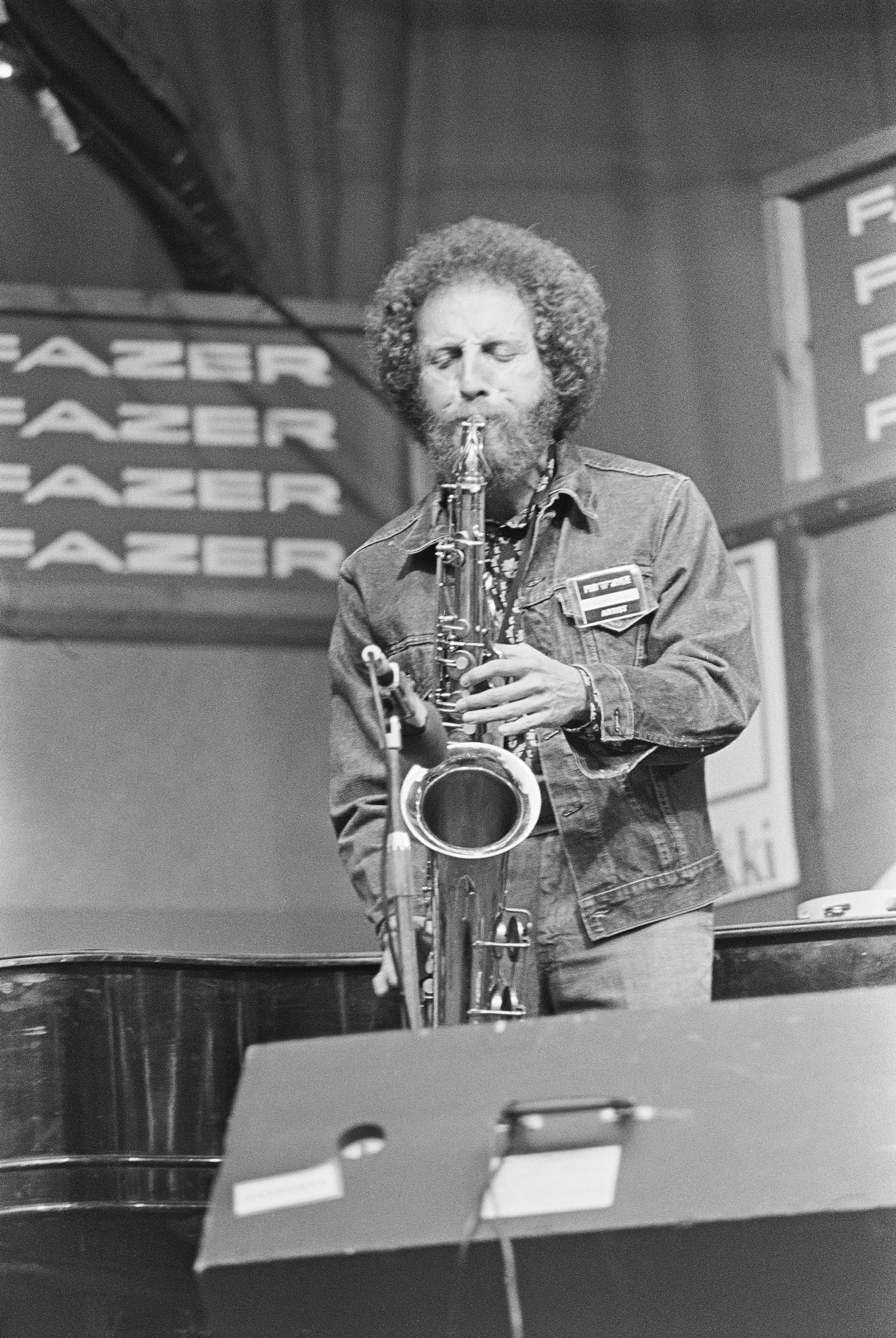
Gerry Niewood playing at Pori Jazz in 1974.

Gerry Niewood (April 6, 1943 – February 12, 2009), born Gerard Joseph Nevidosky, was an American jazz saxophonist and flutist who worked often with Chuck Mangione. Like Mangione, Niewood was born in Rochester, New York, and graduated from the Eastman School of Music.

He worked with Mangione from 1968 to 1976 and shortly after led a band with Dave Samuels. He spent most of his career as a session musician. In the 1990s, he returned to playing with Mangione. He and band member Coleman Mellett died in the crash of Colgan Air Flight 3407 on February 12, 2009.

== Discography ==
=== Principal ===
- The Gerry Niewood Album (Sagoma/DGM, 1975)
- Slow Hot Wind (A&M, 1975)
- Gerry Niewood and Timepiece (A&M\Horizon, 1977)
- Share My Dream (DMP, 1985)
- Alone (Profile, 1988)
- Facets (Native Language, 2004)

=== As sideman ===
With Walter Bishop Jr.

- Soul Village (Muse, 1977)

With Chuck Mangione

- Friends and Love (Mercury, 1970)
- Together: A New Chuck Mangione Concert (Mercury, 1971)
- The Chuck Mangione Quartet (Mercury, 1972)
- Alive! (Mercury, 1972)
- Land of Make Believe (Mercury, 1973)
- Chase the Clouds Away (A&M, 1975)
- Bellavia (A&M, 1975)
- Encore (Mercury, 1975)
- Encore: Mangione Concerts (Mercury, 1991)
- The Feeling's Back (Chesky, 1999)
- Everything for Love (Chesky, 2000)

With Gap Mangione

- Planet Gap (1998)
- Stolen Moments (2003)
- Family Holidays (2004)

With others

- Towering Toccata, Lalo Schifrin (CTI, 1976)
- Havana Candy, Patti Austin (CTI, 1977)
- Dancin' and Lovin', The Spinners (Atlantic, 1979)
- The Concert in Central Park, Paul Simon & Art Garfunkel (Concert, 1981)
- The Concert in Central Park, Paul Simon & Art Garfunkel (Album, Warner Brothers 1982)
- Walk on the Water, Gerry Mulligan, (DRG, 1980)
- Concerto de Aranjuez, Jim Hall (1981)
- The Artistry of Mark Murphy, Mark Murphy (1982)
- Living Room, Mark Murphy (1984)
- Am I Not Your Girl?, Sinéad O'Connor (1992)
- Moments Like This, Peggy Lee (1993)
- World Tour, Jason Miles (1994)
- Awakening, Randy Sandke (1998)
- Easy Living, Ann Hampton Callaway (1999)
