= Together: A New Chuck Mangione Concert =

Live album by Chuck Mangione
- Released: 1971
- Recorded: Auditorium Theatre, Rochester, NY
- Genre: Jazz
- Label: Mercury
- Producer: Chuck Mangione

Chuck Mangione chronology
Friends and Love (1970)	Together: A New Chuck Mangione Concert (1971)	The Chuck Mangione Quartet (1972)

Professional ratings
Review scores
Source	Rating
AllMusic	3/5 stars

Together: A New Chuck Mangione Concert is a double album recorded live at the Auditorium Theatre in Rochester, New York on May 15, 1971, and released by Mercury Records. It features the Rochester Philharmonic Orchestra, Chuck Mangione ([mäɳ:ɖʒɔ'nɛ]) on flugelhorn, Gerry Niewood, Don Potter, Bat McGrath, Gap Mangione, Esther Satterfield, Steve Gadd, and Stanley Watson.

== Track listing ==
Disc one
No.	Title	Writer(s)	Length
1.	"Sun Shower"	Chuck Mangione	5:45
2.	"Legacy"	Chuck Mangione	10:53
3.	"Pages from a Journal in America"	Stanley Watson	11:08
4.	"Firewatchers"	Chuck Mangione	13:23
5.	"Places Warm"	Bat McGrath and Don Potter	5:38

Disc two
No.	Title	Writer(s)	Length
1.	"Feelin'"	Bat McGrath and Don Potter	5:57
2.	"Lullaby for Nancy Carol"	Chuck Mangione	3:08
3.	"Look to the Children"	Chuck Mangione	6:30
4.	"Freddie's Walkin'"	Chuck Mangione	6:41
5.	"Sixty Miles Young"	Chuck Mangione	15:22
6.	"Hill Where the Lord Hides"	Chuck Mangione	6:58

== Personnel ==
- Rochester Philharmonic Orchestra
- Chuck Mangione - conductor, flugelhorn, electric and acoustic piano
- Gap Mangione - electric piano
- Gerry Niewood - soprano saxophone, tenor saxophone, baritone saxophone, flute, and alto flute
- Don Potter - voice, acoustic guitar, dobro, harmonica
- Esther Satterfield - voice
- Steve Gadd - drums, tambourine
- Bat McGrath - guitarrón, voice, Fender bass
- Stanley Watson - guitar
