= Fun and Games (Chuck Mangione album) =

Album by Chuck Mangione

Studio album by Chuck Mangione
- Released: February 4, 1980
- Genre: Jazz
- Length: 42:53
- Label: A&M
- Producer: Chuck Mangione

Chuck Mangione chronology
Children of Sanchez (1978)	Fun and Games (1980)	Tarantella (1980)

Professional ratings
Review scores
Source	Rating
AllMusic	3/5 stars

Fun and Games is a 1979 album recorded by the American flugelhorn player Chuck Mangione, who released it on the A&M Records label. It included the song "Give It All You Got", which ABC Sports used for the 1980 Winter Olympics, as well as a slower version of that song, "Give It All You Got, But Slowly". The latter was also used during the 1980s as sign-off music for many American television stations.

== Track listing ==
All tracks composed and arranged by Chuck Mangione:

No.	Title	Length
1.	"Give It All You Got"	6:16
2.	"You're the Best There Is"	7:34
3.	"Piña Colada"	8:15
4.	"I Never Missed Someone Before"	9:37
5.	"Give it All You Got, But Slowly"	4:27
6.	"Fun and Games"	7:11
Total length:		42:53

== Personnel ==
- Chuck Mangione - Flugelhorn, electric piano
- Grant Geissman - Electric guitar, acoustic guitar, 12 string guitar
- James Bradley, Jr. - Drums, congas, triangle
- Charles Meeks - Bass guitar, harmonica
- Bill Reichenbach Jr. - Trombone
- Chris Vadala - Flute, soprano saxophone, tenor saxophone, piccolo, alto flute

== Certifications ==
Certifications for Fun and Games
Region	Certification	Certified units/sales
United States (RIAA)	Gold	500,000^{^}
^{^} Shipments figures based on certification alone.
