= Land of Make Believe (Chuck Mangione album) =

Live album by Chuck Mangione
- Released: 1973
- Recorded: June 21, 1973
- Venue: Massey Hall, Toronto, Ontario, Canada
- Genre: Jazz; Crossover jazz; Easy listening
- Length: 39:00
- Label: Mercury
- Producer: Richard Seidel, Chuck Mangione

Chuck Mangione chronology
| Together (1972) | Land of Make Believe (1973) | Bellavia (1975) |

Professional ratings
Review scores
| Source | Rating |
|---|---|
| AllMusic | 4.5/5 stars |

Land of Make Believe is the eighth album by jazz artist Chuck Mangione. The title song is sung by Esther Satterfield. It also features Mangione's older brother Gap Mangione and jazz trumpet player Jon Faddis.

== Track listing ==
All songs written by Chuck Mangione

| No. | Title | Length |
|---|---|---|
| 1. | "Legend of the One-Eyed Sailor" | 7:38 |
| 2. | "Lullaby for Nancy Carol" | 3:36 |
| 3. | "El Gato Triste" | 7:23 |
| 4. | "The Gloria from the Mass of St. Bernard" | 4:07 |
| 5. | "As Long as We're Together" | 3:52 |
| 6. | "Land of Make Believe" | 12:24 |
| Total length: | | 39:00 |

== Personnel ==
- Chuck Mangione - flugelhorn, mixing, orchestration, conductor, arranger
- Joseph C. Crupi - conductor, director
- Marta Hidy - concertmaster, violin
- Gap Mangione - electric piano, toy instruments
- Catherine Lehr, Edgar Hayes, Zdenek Konicek - cello
- Ned Corman, Paula Elliott, Gordon Johnson, Gerry Niewood, Ray Ricker, Joe Romano - flute
- Charles Daellenbach - tuba
- Eugene Watts, Bill Reichenbach Jr., Janice Robinson, Art Linser III - trombone
- Robert Hansen, Gregory Hustis, Graeme Page, Brad Warnaar - French horn
- Jon Faddis, Jeff Tyzik, Fred Mills, Ronald Romm - trumpet
- Barbara Hustis, Jaroslav Karlovský, Ann Armin - viola
- David Hung, Rudolph Kalup, Christine Haarvig, Beth Gorevic, Natalie Mysko, Margaret Neufeld, Kathryn Wunder, Michel Zaitzeff - violin
- Ray Ricker, Joe Romano - tenor saxophone
- Esther Satterfield - vocals
- Ron Berger, Scott Bump, Jeff Bowlby, Steve Russell - tenor vocals
- Kathleen Collins, Barbara Hendricks, Terry Lodge - alto vocals
- Jan Walp - soprano vocals
- Russ Cembrinski, Michael Cleveland, Jim Smith, Jeff Wilber, Jim Wilber - bass vocals
- Al Johnson - electric bass
- Joe LaBarbera - drums
- Steve Gadd - drums
- Ron Davis - percussion
- Tom Elliot, John Courtney - bassoon
- David Young, Jack McFadden - string bass
- Don Potter - guitar

== Production ==
- Bob Ludwig - mastering
- Phil Ramone - editing, engineering, mixing
- Richard Seidel - producer
- Richie Blakin - editing, mixing
- Dennis Drake - remixing
- Robin McBride - production assistant
- Jack Kramer - production assistant
