= Chase the Clouds Away =

Studio album by Chuck Mangione
- Released: 1975
- Recorded: A&M (Hollywood)
- Genre: Jazz
- Length: 35:22
- Label: A&M
- Producer: Chuck Mangione

Chuck Mangione chronology
Bellavia (1975)	Chase the Clouds Away (1975)	Encore (1975)

Professional ratings
Review scores
Source	Rating
AllMusic	3/5 stars

Chase the Clouds Away is the tenth album by jazz musician Chuck Mangione. The song "Chase the Clouds Away" was used at the 1976 Summer Olympics in Montreal, Quebec.

== Track listing ==
All songs written by Chuck Mangione

No.	Title	Length
1.	"Song of the New Moon"	6:35
2.	"Can't We Do This All Night"	5:27
3.	"He Was a Friend of Mine"	6:25
4.	"Echano"	8:31
5.	"Chase the Clouds Away #96 Billboard Hot 100"	4:51
6.	"Soft"	3:31

== Personnel ==
- Chuck Mangione - flugelhorn, electric piano, Fender Rhodes
- Gerry Niewood - flute, soprano saxophone, alto saxophone, alto flute
- Kathryn Moses - flute, piccolo
- Bill Reichenbach Jr. - trombone
- Edgar Lustgarten - cello
- Joe LaBarbera - drums
- Charles "Chip" Jackson - bass guitar
- Vincent DeRosa - French horn
- Esther Satterfield - vocals

== Production ==
- Mick Guzauski - Engineer
- Dave Iveland - Assistant Engineer
- Harry Mittman - Photography
- Ellis Sorkin - Assistant Engineer
- Roland Young - Art Direction
- Kai Winding - Orchestra Contractor, Personal Manager

== Certifications ==
Certifications for Chase the Clouds Away
Region	Certification	Certified units/sales
United States (RIAA)	Gold	500,000^{^}
^{^} Shipments figures based on certification alone.
