= Rochester Philharmonic Orchestra =

Orchestra based in New York, US

Rochester Philharmonic Orchestra (RPO)
- Orchestra
- official logo
- Founded: 1922; 104 years ago
- Location: Rochester, New York, U.S.
- Concert hall: Eastman Theatre
- Music director: Andreas Delfs
- Website: rpo.org

The Rochester Philharmonic Orchestra (RPO) is an American orchestra based in the city of Rochester, New York. Its primary concert venue is the Eastman Theatre at the Eastman School of Music.

== History ==
George Eastman, founder of Eastman Kodak Company, founded the orchestra in 1922, with Eugene Goossens and Albert Coates as the first principal conductors of the orchestra, in a joint appointment. Other past music directors of the orchestra included Erich Leinsdorf, who made several recordings with the orchestra that increased its profile. From 1939 through 1964, the Rochester Philharmonic, usually supplemented by faculty members of the Eastman School, often recorded under the names Eastman-Rochester Orchestra under the direction of Howard Hanson and Eastman-Rochester Pops under Frederick Fennell.

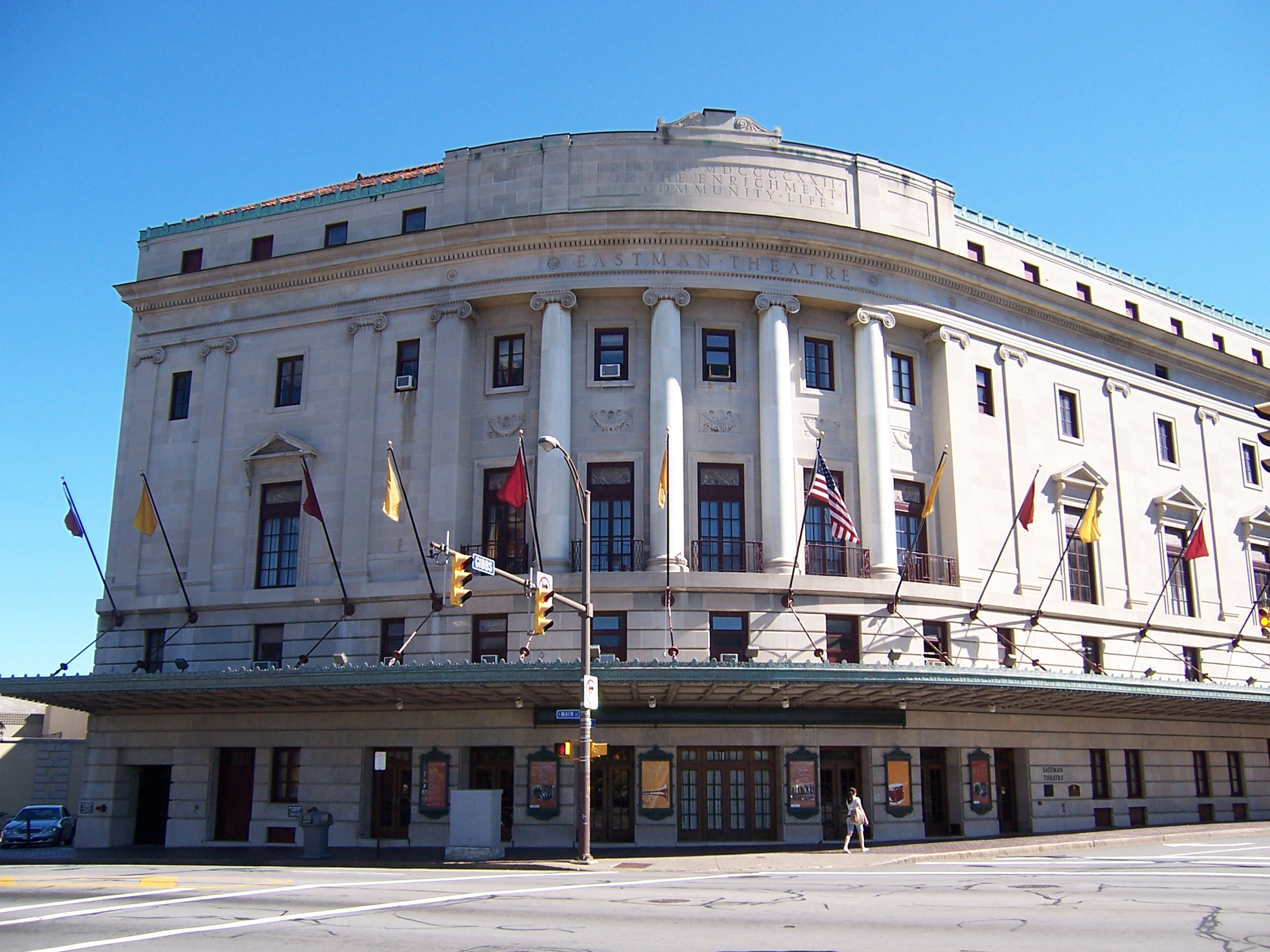
Rochester Eastman Theatre - Exterior - Concert venue of the Rochester Philharmonic Orchestra

From 1990 through 2008, the RPO had its summer residency at the Bravo! Vail Valley Music Festival, in Vail, Colorado.

In September 2010, the RPO named Arild Remmereit as its 11th music director, effective September 2011. In November 2012, the RPO board voted to terminate Remmereit's contract two years early, Remmereit stood down as music director after the 2012–2013 season. Ward Stare succeeded Remmereit as music director as of the 2014–2015 season, and held the post through the 2020–2021 season.

In 1994, Andreas Delfs first guest-conducted the orchestra. In January 2021, the orchestra named Delfs its next music director. Delfs formally became music director as of the 2021–2022 season. In October 2025, the orchestra announced an extension of Delfs' contract as its music director through the 2028–2029 season.

The RPO sponsors the Rochester Philharmonic Youth Orchestra (RPYO), founded in 1970 and composed of Rochester-area student musicians in the eighth through twelfth grades. Under the direction of James Mick, the RPYO performs three concerts annually, including one side by side with the RPO. Members of the RPO serve as mentors for the youth orchestra. In 2000, the orchestra named Michael Butterman its principal conductor for education and outreach, the first position of its kind in the country. Jherrard Hardeman was appointed in 2023 as the RPYO Music Director.

Jeff Tyzik has served as the orchestra's principal pops conductor since 1994. RPO concerts are rebroadcast on WXXI 91.5 FM.

In June 2026, the orchestra announced the appointment of Tonya McBride Robles as its next president and chief executive officer, effective 17 August 2026.

The logo in use before 2009.

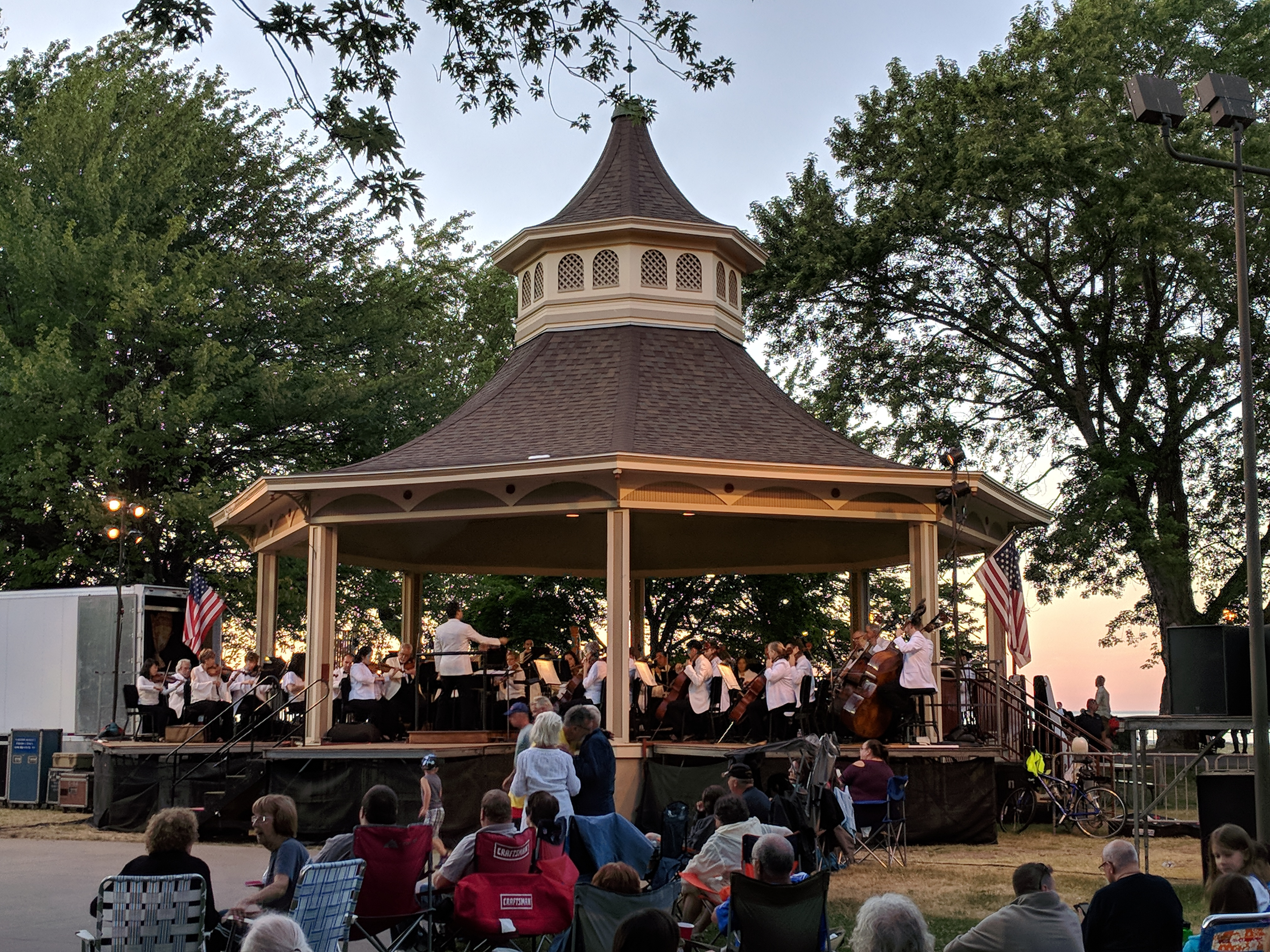
The Rochester Philharmonic Orchestra performing at Ontario Beach Park in 2018

== Music directors ==
- Albert Coates (1923–1925)
- Eugene Goossens (1923–1931)
- José Iturbi (1936–1944)
- Erich Leinsdorf (1947–1955)
- Theodore Bloomfield (1959–1963)
- László Somogyi (1964–1968)
- Walter Hendl (1968–1970; interim conductor)
- Samuel Jones (1970–1971; interim conductor)
- David Zinman (1974–1985)
- Jerzy Semkow (1985–1988; principal conductor)
- Mark Elder (1989–1994)
- Robert Bernhardt (1994–1998)
- Christopher Seaman (1998–2011)
- Arild Remmereit (2011–2013)
- Ward Stare (2014–2021)
- Andreas Delfs (2021–present)

== Selected discography ==
The RPO has recorded under at least three different names: Eastman Rochester Orchestra, Rochester Pops Orchestra, and the Rochester Philharmonic Orchestra. Recordings have featured many prominent American composers, including George Gershwin, Samuel Barber, Morton Gould, and Howard Hanson). The orchestra's first recordings were from the late 1930s and early 1940s, conducted by Hanson and José Iturbi. Among these is a 1939 recording of William Grant Still's Afro-American Symphony, conducted by Hanson. The RPO presented the world premiere of this work in 1931.

External audio
- You may hear the Rochester Philharmonic Orchestra conducted by José Iturbi performing Symphony No. 9 in E minor, Op.95 (From the New World) Op. 95 by Antonin Dvorak in 1941 Here on archive.org

- 1939 – William Grant Still’s "Afro-American Symphony": Howard Hanson, conductor. (RCA)
- 1939–40 – Hanson’s Symphony No. 2: Howard Hanson, conductor. (RCA)
- 1940–41 – Hanson’s Suite from "Merry Mount": Howard Hanson, conductor. (RCA)
- 1940 – Mendelssohn’s Symphony No. 3 in A minor, \"Scotch\": José Iturbi, conductor. (RCA Victor)
- 1941 – Beethoven’s Concerto No. 3 in C minor, Op.37: José Iturbi, piano and conductor. (RCA Victor)
- 1941 – Dvorak's Symphony No. 9 in E minor, "From the New World," Op. 95: José Iturbi, conductor. (RCA Victor)
- 1941 – Mozart’s Concerto in E flat Major K.365: José Iturbi, piano and conductor; Amparo Iturbi, piano. (RCA Victor)
- 1952 – Beethoven’s Symphony No. 3 in E-flat major, "Eroica," Op. 55: Erich Leinsdorf, conductor. (Columbia Entré)
- 1952 – Grainger: Country Gardens: Morton Gould, conductor. Includes selections by Percy Grainger. (Columbia)
- 1953 – Rachmaninoff’s "Symphonic Dances", Op. 45: Erich Leinsdorf, conductor. (Columbia)

External audio
- You may hear the Rochester Philharmonic Orchestra with Erich Leinsdorf performing: Mozart's Symphony No 41 in C Major, (K. 551) "Jupiter"; Mozart's Symphony No.35 in D Major (K. 385) "Hoffner" in 1957 Here on archive.org

- 1954 – Symphonic Serenade: Morton Gould, conductor. Includes selections by Victor Herbert and Albert W. Ketèlbey. (Columbia)
- 1955 – Mendelssohn’s Symphony No. 4 in A major, "Italian," Op. 90: Erich Leinsdorf, conductor. Also includes Haydn's Symphony No. 101 in D major, "The Clock." (Harmony/Columbia)
- 1957 – Gershwin: Concerto in F, "Rhapsody in Blue": Howard Hanson, conductor; Eugene List, piano. (Mercury)
- 1957 – Hi-Fi a la Española: Frederick Fennell and Eastman-Rochester Pops. Includes selections by Ernesto Lecuona, Percy Faith, Manuel de Falla. (Mercury)
- 1957 - Mozart's Symphony No. 41 in C major (K. 551), "Jupiter" & Mozart's Symphony No. 35 in D major (K. 385) "Haffner": Erich Leinsdorf, conductor. (Harmony)
- 1959 – Popovers: Frederick Fennell and Eastman-Rochester Pops. Includes selections by Liszt, Sibelius, Debussy, Shostakovich. (Mercury)
- 1960 – Grofé’s Grand Canyon Suite and Concerto for piano & orchestra in D minor: Ferde Grofé, conductor; Jesús Maria Sanromá, piano. (Everest)
- 1960 – Sibelius: Symphony No. 5, Op. 82, Finlandia. Theodore Bloomfield, conductor (Everest)
- 1960 – Debussy: Iberia; Ravel: La Valse; Rapsodie Espagnole. Theodore Bloomfield, conductor (Everest)
- 1970 – Friends & Love: Chuck Mangione, conductor and flugelhorn; Don Potter, guitar & vocals; Bat McGrath, guitarron and vocals; Gap Mangione, electric piano; Stanley Watson, guitar; Marvin Stamm, trumpet; Gerry Niewood, soprano saxophone, alto saxophone, and flute (Mercury, recorded live at Eastman Theatre)
- 1971 – Together: A New Chuck Mangione Concert: Chuck Mangione, conductor, flugelhorn, electric and acoustic piano; Gerry Niewood, soprano, tenor, barisaxes, flute, and alto flute; Don Potter, voice, acoustic guitar, dobro, harmonica; Bat McGrath, voice, Fender bass; Gap Mangione, electric piano; Esther Satterfield, vocals; Stanley Watson, guitar. (Mercury, recorded live at Auditorium Theatre)
- 1978 – Mozart’s Concerto for Two Pianos & Orchestra in E flat major, K. 365 (K. 316a): David Zinman, conductor; Rudolf Firkusny & Alan Weiss, pianos. (Vox)
- 1978 – The Creatures of Prometheus: David Zinman, conductor; Eileen Malone, harp; Samuel Cristler, cello; Michael Webster, corno di bassetto; Robert Sprenkle, oboe. (Turnabout)
- 1979 – Mendelssohn’s Symphony No.3 "Scottish": David Zinman, conductor. Also includes Mendelssohn's Hebrides Overture, Symphony No.4 \"Italian,\" Symphony No.5 "Reformation." (Vox)
- 1984 – Dvořák’s Legends, Op. 59: David Zinman, conductor. (Nonesuch Digital)
- 1985 – My First Concert: Isaiah Jackson, conductor. Recording for children including selections from works by Beethoven, Grieg, Dukas, Gounod, Bizet.
- 1992 – Romancing the Film: Lalo Schifrin, conductor. Includes selections from Casablanca, Gone with the Wind, The Godfather, Dirty Dancing, Little Mermaid, Lawrence of Arabia. (Pro Arte)
- 1992 – "The Story of Percussion in the Orchestra" (NEXUS CD#10306): William L. Cahn, conductor; Bill Moyers, narrator; NEXUS Percussion, soloists
- 1993 – Syncopated Clock and Other Favorites by Leroy Anderson: Erich Kunzel, conductor. (Proarte)
- 1994 – "Voices" (NEXUS CD#10317): Peter Bay, Wm.L.Cahn, conductors; NEXUS Percussion, soloists; four concertos for Percussion & Orch.
- 1997 – Encore 75: Robert Bernhardt, Jeff Tyzik, conductors. Includes American In Paris, Pictures at an Exhibition, Selections by Duke Ellington, Vernon Duke, Mercer Ellington, George Gershwin, Billy Strayhorn, and Louis Prima.
- 2001 – Rachmaninov with Jon Nakamatsu: Christopher Seaman, conductor; Jon Nakamatsu, piano. Includes Rachmaninov's Rhapsody on a Theme of Paganini and Piano Concerto No. 3. (harmonia mundi)
- 2003 – Tchaikovsky with Olga Kern: Christopher Seaman, conductor; Olga Kern, piano. Includes Tchaikovsky's Piano Concerto No. 1 and Francesca da Rimini. (harmonia mundi)
- 2006 – George Gershwin with Jon Nakamatsu: Jeff Tyzik, conductor; Jon Nakamatsu, piano. Includes Gershwin's Piano Concerto in F, Rhapsody in Blue, and Cuban Overture. (harmonia mundi)
- 2006 – A Holiday Celebration: Jeff Tyzik, conductor; Tonio Di Paolo, tenor; Festival High School Chorale. Includes Jeff Tyzik's The Twelve Gifts of Christmas, Little Drummer Boy, and Chanukah Suite.
- 2008 – HONOR: Portraits of America: Jeff Tyzik, conductor. Includes The Star Spangled Banner, National Emblem March, Fantasy on American Themes, Pleasant Valley Suite, Armed Forces Song Medley, Bravo! Colorado, Stars and Stripes Forever.
- 2011 – The Story of Babar and A Family for Baby Grand: Michael Butterman, conductor; John Lithgow and Jennifer Carsillo, narrators.
- 2012 – Ralph Vaughan Williams: A London Symphony and Serenade to Music: Christopher Seaman, conductor.
- 2019 – American Rapture: Ward Stare, conductor; Yolanda Kondonassis, harp. (Azica Records)

== Honors and awards ==
The RPO was one of the first American orchestras to use radio to help increase its outreach and education. The RPO first began national radio broadcasts, on the NBC Blue Network, in 1929. In 1939, 1941, and 1944, the orchestra won First Place at the Exhibition of Educational Programs for its elementary school programming.

In 1959, the Ford Foundation invited the RPO to participate in a program to promote new American composers and their works. The RPO has received the ASCAP Award for Adventurous Programming four times, in 1982, 2005, 2006, and 2012, in recognition of its commitment to music written in the previous 25 years. In 2002, the RPO was awarded the New York State Governor's Arts Award for excellence and community service. The Rochester Arts and Cultural Council's Artist Award has been given to both Jeff Tyzik (2002) and Christopher Seaman (2003).

The Concert Companion radio broadcast with Christopher Seaman on WXXI 91.5 FM won both the Gabriel Award and the Silver Reel Award in 2002. In 2007, the RPO's web site received two of the Rochester Business Journal's "Best of the Web" awards; and that same year, the RPO's annual report received an award from the Rochester chapter of the Public Relations Society of America. In 2013, the RPO again was awarded the Rochester Business Journal's "Best of the Web" Award for Nonprofit (Cultural).

In 2012, the RPO received the first-ever Amy Award for Excellence in Orchestral Programming from Women's Philharmonic Advocacy.

In 2018, the RPO and harpist Yolanda Kondonassis, conducted by Ward Stare, recorded the world premiere recording of Jennifer Higdon's Harp Concerto. This recording received a Grammy Award in 2020 for Best Contemporary Classical Composition and was nominated for Best Classical Instrumental Solo in the same year.

== Sources ==
- Rochester's Orchestra: A History of the Rochester Philharmonic Orchestra and its Educational Programming, 1922 to 1989; by William L. Cahn, published 1989.
- The Eastman Theatre: Fulfilling George Eastman's Dream; by Elizabeth Brayer, photos by Andy Olenick, design by Kathryn D'Amanda; to be published in December 2010.
