= The Children of Sanchez (film) =

1978 American drama film based on the book by Oscar Lewis

- Theatrical release poster
- Directed by: Hall Bartlett
- Written by: Hall Bartlett; Cesare Zavattini
- Screenplay by: Cesare Zavattini, Hall Bartlett
- Based on: a book by Oscar Lewis
- Starring: Anthony Quinn; Dolores del Río; Katy Jurado; Lupita Ferrer
- Cinematography: Gabriel Figueroa
- Edited by: Marshall M. Borden
- Music by: Chuck Mangione
- Production companies: Carmel Enterprises; CONACINE; Hall Bartlett Productions
- Distributed by: Lone Star Pictures
- Release date: November 16, 1978
- Running time: 126 minutes
- Countries: United States; Mexico
- Language: English

The Children of Sanchez is a 1978 Mexican-American drama film based on the book with the same title by Oscar Lewis. The film was entered into the 11th Moscow International Film Festival.

The movie's well-known soundtrack, titled Children of Sanchez, was created by jazz musician Chuck Mangione. Its opening song won the Grammy Award for Best Pop Instrumental Performance for that year.

== Plot ==
Mr. Sanchez struggles with the culture of poverty around him. A widowed farmer, he cares for his family in a marginal area of Mexico City. While being a hard worker who feels the duty to financially support his family, he is still an aggressive, domineering man and a womanizer. His main conflict is with his daughter, Consuelo, a rebellious girl who attempts to break free from her father. She strives to escape her role of dutiful daughter and pursue her own dreams. Consuelo likes to talk with her grandmother, who secretly advises her to find a man and get married. This is the only way that she, an uneducated poor woman, can escape her father.

== Cast ==
- Anthony Quinn as Jesús Sánchez
- Dolores del Río as Grandma Paquita
- Katy Jurado as Chata
- Lupita Ferrer as Consuelo Sánchez
- Lucia Mendez as Martha Sanchez
- Josefina Echanove as Lupe
- Patricia Reyes Spindola as Paula's sister
- Stathis Giallelis as Roberto
- Sergio Calderón as Alberto

== Reception ==
Among those in attendance at the film's American premiere, which was held on November 16, 1978, were U.S. President Jimmy Carter and First Lady Rosalynn Carter, both of whom were greeted by performers Ferrer and Quinn as well as director Bartlett. Quinn himself escorted the President and the First Lady to their seats. All proceeds went to the Mexican American Legal Defense and Educational Fund.

The musical score for the film was written by Chuck Mangione and won a Grammy Award. The film's title song was also written by Mangione and earned him a Grammy for Best Pop Instrumental Performance.

== See also ==
- Children of Sanchez - album
- The Children of Sanchez - book
