= Coleman Mellett =

American jazz musician

Coleman Mellett (May 27, 1974 – February 12, 2009) was an American jazz guitarist in Chuck Mangione's band. He had been scheduled to play with Mangione and the Buffalo Philharmonic Orchestra on February 13, 2009, but was killed the night before in the crash of Colgan Air Flight 3407 with band member Gerry Niewood.

Mellett lived in East Brunswick Township, New Jersey, with his wife, jazz singer Jeanie Bryson, daughter of Dizzy Gillespie. Mellett joined Mangione's band in 1999.

A documentary about the artist won Best Documentary Film at the 2019 New Jersey International Film Festival.
