= I Love Being Here with You (album) =

Studio album by Jeanie Bryson
- Released: 1993
- Recorded: January 1993
- Studio: Clinton
- Label: Telarc
- Producer: John Snyder

Jeanie Bryson chronology
I Love Being Here with You (1993)	Tonight I Need You So (1994)

I Love Being Here with You is the debut album by the American musician Jeanie Bryson, released in 1993. Bryson had performed in East Coast clubs for around a decade prior to recording the album.

== Production ==
Recorded in January 1993, the album was produced by John Snyder. "Change Partners" is performed in a bossa nova style. "Sunshower" and "Bittersweet" were written by Bryson with her mother, Connie. "Squeeze Me" is a cover of the Fats Waller song. Kenny Barron played piano on the album; Wallace Roney played trumpet. Don Braden played tenor saxophone, while Steve Nelson contributed on vibraphone.

== Critical reception ==
Professional ratings
Review scores
Source	Rating
AllMusic	4/5 stars
Calgary Herald	A
The Encyclopedia of Popular Music	3/5 stars
The Indianapolis Star	3/4 stars
MusicHound Jazz: The Essential Album Guide	4.5/5 stars
The Penguin Guide to Jazz on CD	3.5/4 stars

The Washington Post stated: "A natural singer who possesses a sultry alto, Bryson often favors the slowest tempos and the most intimate balladry this side of Shirley Horn." The Calgary Herald deemed the album "a strong debut from a dreamy-voiced vocalist who has inherited her bar-straddling rhythmic talent from her father, Dizzy Gillespie." The Indianapolis Star determined that "Bryson has a way of sounding conversational and off-hand while not sacrificing intensity."

The Ottawa Citizen opined that Bryson "sounds best on medium tempo tunes like 'A Sleepin' Bee' and the Latin tune, 'Love Dance', which allow the polished duskiness and subtleties of her voice to sink in." The Toronto Star noted that Bryson "has a husky, emotional voice with dreamily-good intonation but ... whatever she sings reminds you of someone else."

AllMusic wrote: "A fine middle-of-the-road song stylist (rather than a jazz singer), Bryson does an excellent job on a set dominated by standards."

== Track listing ==
No.	Title	Length
1.	"Cheek to Cheek"
2.	"Squeeze Me"
3.	"Bittersweet"
4.	"A Sleepin' Bee"
5.	"Love Dance"
6.	"I Feel So Smoochie"
7.	"You've Changed"
8.	"Sunshower"
9.	"Cloudy Morning"
10.	"Change Partners"
11.	"I Love Being Here with You"
