= Fred von Bernewitz =

American film editor

- Born: December 10, 1938 (age 87); Washington, D.C., United States
- Occupation: Film editor

Fred von Bernewitz (born December 10, 1938, Washington, D.C.) is a film editor, currently with HBO. His work in film editing over four decades ranges from TV commercials to features, including several films by Robert Downey Sr.

he died in 2020 from COVID

== Career ==
Interviewed in 2008 by the film critic Stuart Klawans for The New York Times, Downey recalled obtaining a camera and working with Bernewitz during the 1960s:

The apparatus turned out to be spring-wound, so the takes could last no longer than 16 seconds, and the film stock was hundred-foot spools of Air Force surplus, salvaged from a dump behind an air base. (Film history can now account for the energetic montage and Scotch tape cinematography of Babo 73.) Postproduction was equally thrifty. “This friend of mine, Fred von Bernewitz, worked as an editor, so we’d sneak into movie editing rooms on the weekend and later send ’em some money.” It becomes evident that Mr. Downey begins most stories with the words, “This guy, a friend of mine.” Does that mean he felt he was part of a community? “Somewhat,” he said, then added: “There were possibilities. People back then were saying, ‘Let’s try this.’ It wasn’t a career. It was just fun.

== Tales of Terror! ==
With Grant Geissman, Bernewitz is the co-author of Tales of Terror! The EC Companion (Gemstone Publishing/Fantagraphics Books, 2000). In Rambles, Chet Williamson reviewed Tales of Terror!:

First and foremost, there's the art: color reproductions of every EC comic ever, and not just the great ones. Here you'll find the covers and complete contents listings, including artists and writers, for everything from Picture Stories from the Bible to the last 1956 issue of Confessions Illustrated. That just scratches the surface of what's inside this nearly 300-page oversized slab of a book. There are tons of historical material, including Bill Gaines' complete testimony before the Senate Sub-Committee investigating the dismal influences of EC comics. There are plenty of other contemporary documents, photographs and interviews, as well as looks at where EC got the raw material for their stories. I was delighted to see that the chapter of horror stories in the Bennett Cerf collection Try and Stop Me, which terrified me when I was a kid, was mined assiduously by the EC crew. There are oodles of little nuggets like this, including features on the Ray Bradbury adaptations, plenty of non-EC art by EC artists, material about early EC fandom, a complete index by story title and a fascinating interview with Russ Cochran, describing his efforts to get the original artwork out of Bill Gaines' storage vault so that he could reproduce it.

Bernewitz compiled the original edition of The Complete EC Checklist (1955). The first index to EC Comics, it has been reprinted several times with updates, and it served as a basis for Tales of Terror! For Mad publisher Bill Gaines, he compiled three volumes of The Complete Mad Checklist (1961, 1964, 1970).

== See also ==
- List of Entertaining Comics publications
