= Ward Stare =

American conductor (born 1982)

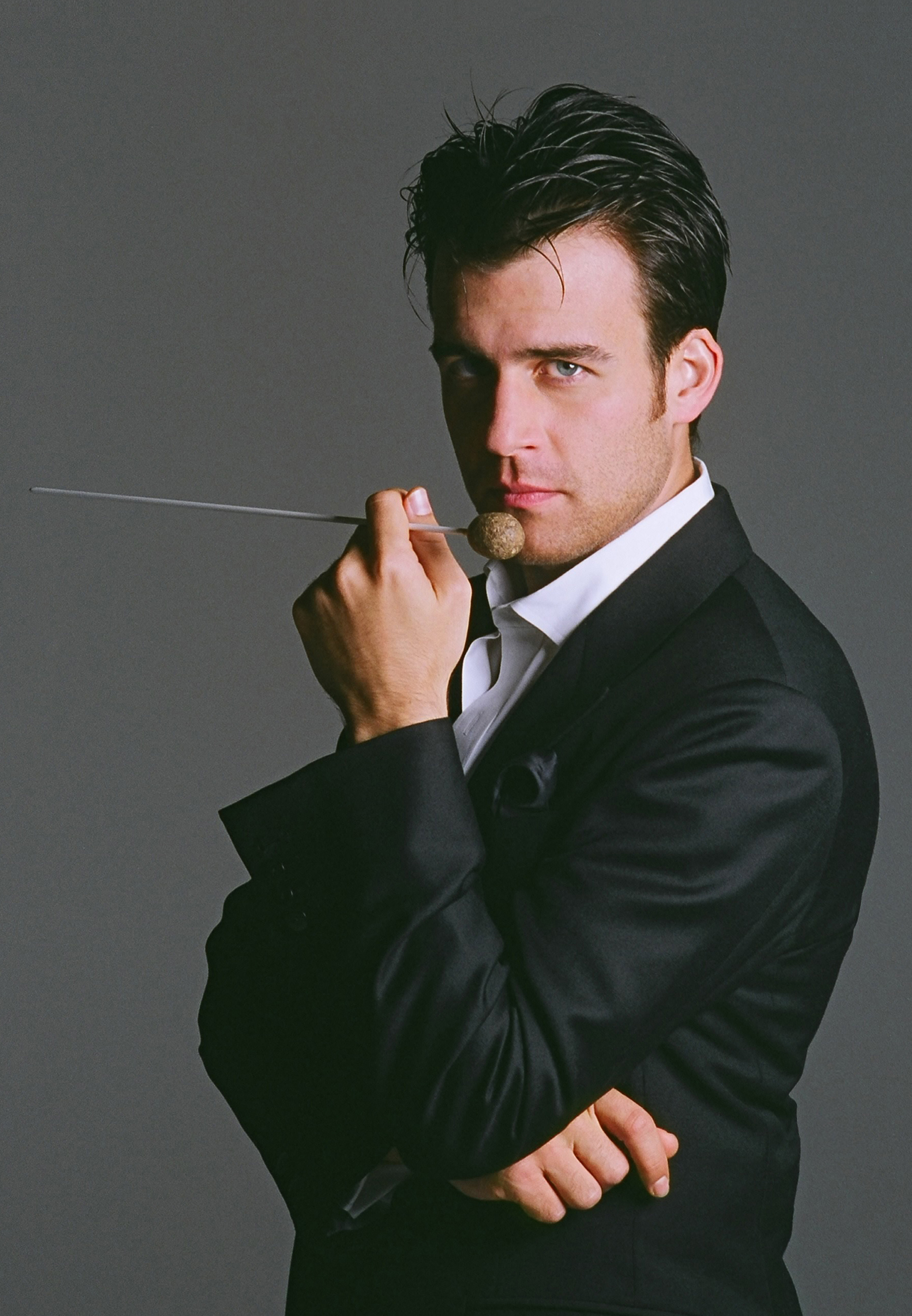
- Ward Stare

Background information
- Born: August 27, 1982 (age 44); Rochester, New York
- Genres: Classical, Opera
- Occupations: Conductor, music director, musician
- Instrument: Trombone
- Website: www.wardstare.com

Ward Stare (Born August 27, 1982) is an American conductor. Stare was the music director of the Rochester Philharmonic Orchestra from 2014 until 2021 and was also the resident conductor of the Saint Louis Symphony Orchestra from 2008 to 2012. Stare is currently active as a guest conductor both domestically within the United States as well as internationally. In addition, Stare currently holds a position as a distinguished artist at the Robert McDuffie Center for Strings at Mercer University in Macon, Georgia.

== Biography ==
=== Early life ===
Stare was born and raised in Rochester, New York. Stare was trained as a trombonist at the Juilliard School in Manhattan. At the age of 18, he was appointed principal trombonist of the Lyric Opera of Chicago and has performed as an orchestral musician with the Chicago Symphony Orchestra and the New York Philharmonic, among others.

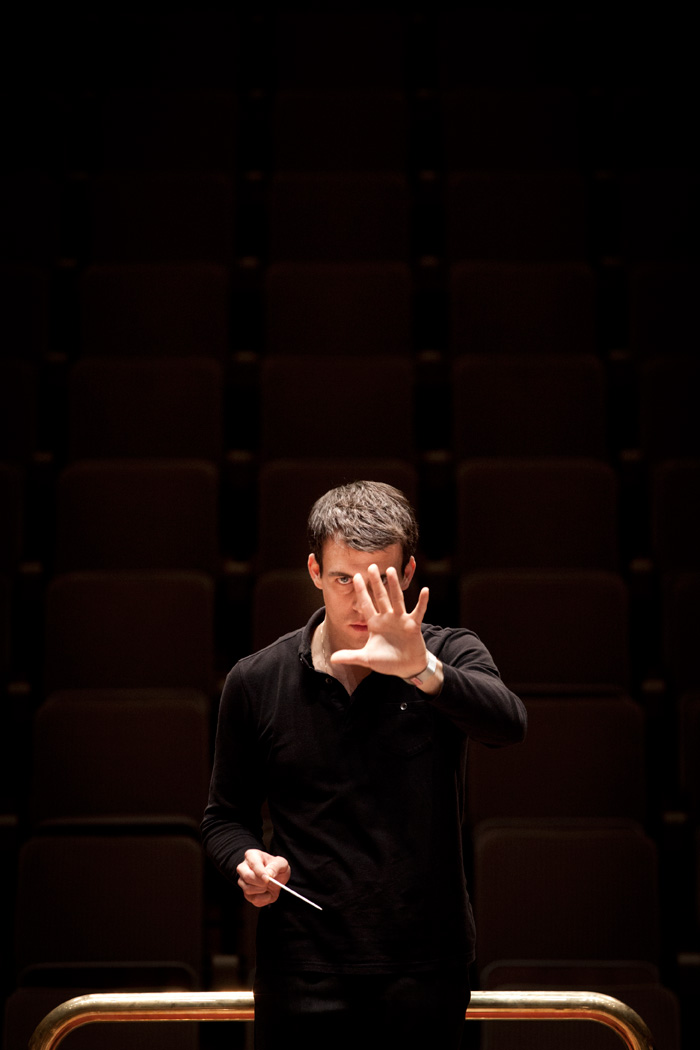
Ward Stare conducts the London Philharmonic Orchestra in April 2012

=== Career ===
In August 2007, Stare made his debut with the Cleveland Orchestra at the Blossom Music Center. Stare also made appearances with the Memphis Symphony, the Florida Orchestra, and the Moscow Chamber Orchestra – both in Russia and on the orchestra's North American tour – as well as a special performance with the Bangkok Symphony Orchestra as part of the Orchestra's "Great Artists of the World" series celebrating the 80th birthday of the King of Thailand.

Stare spent the 2007 and 2008 seasons as a League of American Orchestras Fellow with the Los Angeles Philharmonic, and conducted concerts on the orchestra's Toyota Symphonies for Youth Series. In the fall of 2008, Stare served as assistant conductor to Sir Andrew Davis at the Lyric Opera of Chicago for their new production of Alban Berg's Lulu.

In 2009, Stare made his debut with the Deutsches Symphonie-Orchester Berlin, as second conductor in Ives' Symphony No. 4, as well as his subscription debut with the Saint Louis Symphony Orchestra.

In April 2009, Stare made his Carnegie Hall debut with the Saint Louis Symphony Orchestra. Stare returned in June 2010, leading the Saint Louis Symphony Youth Orchestra in their New York City debut at the Riverside Church.

The 2010 and 2011 season Stare's returned to the Deutsches Symphonie-Orchester Berlin as guest conductor, as well as his European operatic debut at the Norwegian Opera in Oslo, with a production of Benjamin Britten's The Rape of Lucretia.

Stare's 2012 and 2013 season was full of many new debuts, in April 2012 Stare conducted with the London Philharmonic Orchestra for the first time, in December 2012 Stare conducted his Lyric Opera of Chicago debut with their production of Hänsel und Gretel, which led to a return the next two seasons for Die Fledermaus (2013) and Porgy and Bess (2014) – both of which received high critical praise. Stare continues his ongoing relationship with the St. Louis Symphony Orchestra, returning regularly as a guest artist.

In 2014, Stare was appointed Music Director for the Rochester Philharmonic Orchestra, the youngest in the organization's history. Stare remained Music Director until 2021.

Stare made his debut with the Metropolitan Opera as a guest conductor in December 2017. He led all nine of their performances of The Merry Widow, with Susan Graham performing the title role.

In his role as distinguished artist and conductor at the McDuffie Center for Strings, Stare has worked alongside R.E.M. Bassist Mike Mills, Rolling Stones Music Director Chuck Leavell, and violinist Robert McDuffie in a special program entitled A Night of Georgia Music and recorded the program for PBS Broadcast in the spring of 2022. Stare is also featured as a conductor in the recording of Mike Mills' Concerto for Violin, Rock Band & String Orchestra and Philip Glass Symphony No. 3, released in 2016 on the Orange Mountain Music record label.

In the 2021/22 season, Stare led the inaugural performances of the Macon-Mercer Symphony Orchestra, a hybrid orchestra combining string students (and alums) from the McDuffie Center with the principal winds, brass, and percussion from the Atlanta Symphony Orchestra. Stare is the conductor and music director of this ground-breaking new ensemble.

== Honors and awards ==
Stare was the recipient of both the Robert J. Harth Conductor Prize in 2006 and the Aspen Conducting Prize in 2007 at the Aspen Music Festival.

In November 2011 Stare was honored with Musician of the Month by Musical America.

In 2019, Stare received a GRAMMY nomination for his recording, American Rapture, along with Yolanda Kondonassis for Jennifer Higdon’s Harp Concerto.

== Recordings ==
- 2016 - Mike Mills Concerto for Violin, Rock Band & String Orchestra - Orange Mountain Music
- 2019 - American Rapture with the Rochester Philharmonic Orchestra - Azica Records
