= Don Potter (musician) =

American musician and producer

Don Potter is an American musician and producer in Nashville, Tennessee. A longstanding producer for Wynonna Judd, he has become known as "the man who created the Judds' sound".

== Musical career ==
Potter has been singing, playing guitar, writing songs, and recording and producing music since the 1960s, and has performed with many notable artists. He played acoustic guitar on the 1971 release of Chuck Mangione's Friends & Love - a Chuck Mangione Concert, and contributed vocals to several Mangione albums, including the soundtrack to the 1978 film Children of Sanchez (album). Potter used to be a member of the Show Stoppers rock and roll band and the Don Potter and Bat McGrath duo based in Rochester, New York.

Potter's website gives emphasis to his ministry as a worship leader in churches, with the style of prophetic worship, seeking to be led by the Holy Spirit in every meeting.

As well as recording numerous albums of his own music, Potter has written many articles and a book about worship called Facing the Wall.

Don Potter resides in North Carolina.

== Discography ==
2000

- Confederate Railroad - Rockin' Country Party Pack (Acoustic Guitar )
- The Judds - Number One Hits (Assistant Producer)
- Kenny Chesney - Greatest Hits (Acoustic Guitar)
- Chuck Mangione - Chuck Mangione's Finest Hour (Guitar, Vocals )

1999

- Michael Johnson - Very Best of Michael Johnson (Producer )
- Lee Roy Parnell - Hits & Highways Ahead (Acoustic Guitar )

1998

- Lyle Lovett - Step Inside This House (Acoustic Guitar)

1997

- Etta James - Love's Been Rough on Me (Acoustic Guitar)
- Wynonna Judd - Collection (Acoustic Guitar, Electric Guitar, Assistant Producer)
- William Topley - Black River (Acoustic Guitar)
- Anita Cochran - Back To You (Acoustic Guitar)

1996

- John Michael Montgomery - What I Do Best (Acoustic Guitar)
- The Judds - Volume 2 - Greatest Hits (Acoustic Guitar, Guitar, Rhythm Guitar, Lead Guitar, Bandleader, Assistant Producer)
- Phil Driscoll - Selah II - Original Improvisations Of The Holy Scriptures (Acoustic Guitar)
- Mindy McCready - Ten Thousand Angels (Acoustic Guitar)
- David Ball - Starlight Lounge (Acoustic Guitar)
- Lyle Lovett - Road To Ensenada (Acoustic Guitar, Spanish Guitar)
- Wynonna Judd - Revelations (Acoustic Guitar, Electric Piano, Associate Producer)
- Clint Black - Greatest Hits (Acoustic Guitar)
- Confederate Railroad - Greatest Hits (Acoustic Guitar)
- Mark Knopfler - Golden Heart (Acoustic Guitar)
- Susan Ashton - Distant Call (Acoustic Guitar)
- Toby Keith - Blue Moon (Acoustic Guitar)
- Neal McCoy - You Gotta Love That (Acoustic Guitar)
- Paul Overstreet - Time (Acoustic Guitar)
- My Utmost for His Highest: The Covenant - Various Artists (Acoustic Guitar)

1995

- Michael James - Where Love Runs Deep (Acoustic Guitar)
- Terri Clark - Terri Clark (Acoustic Guitar, Electric Guitar)
- Dolly Parton - Something Special (Acoustic Guitar)
- Willie Nelson - Revolutions Of Time - Journey 19 (Acoustic Guitar)
- Kirk Whalum - In This Life (Electric Guitar)
- Toby Keith - Boomtown (Acoustic Guitar)
- Kenny Chesney - All I Need To Know (Acoustic Guitar)
- My Utmost for His Highest - Various Artists (Acoustic Guitar)

1994

- Faith Hill - Take Me As I Am (Acoustic Guitar, Electric Guitar)
- Phil Driscoll - Selah I - Original Improvisations Of The Holy Scriptures (Acoustic Guitar)
- Rick Trevino - Rick Trevino (Acoustic Guitar)
- Conway Twitty Collection (Acoustic Guitar)

1993

- Elton John - Duets (Acoustic Guitar)
- Toby Keith - Toby Keith (Acoustic Guitar, Electric Guitar)
- Shelby Lynne - Temptation (Acoustic Guitar, Electric Guitar)
- Wynonna Judd - Tell Me Why (Acoustic Guitar, Associate Producer)
- Kathy Mattea - Good News (Electric Guitar)
- Ricky Van Shelton - Bridge I Didn't Burn (Acoustic Guitar, Pedal Steel)

1992

- Wynonna Judd - Wynonna (Acoustic Guitar, Electric Guitar, Assistant Producer)
- Kathy Mattea - Lonesome Standard Time (Acoustic Guitar, Electric Guitar)
- Steve Green - Hymns - A Portrait Of Christ (Electric Guitar)
- Trisha Yearwood - Hearts In Armor (Acoustic Guitar)
- Clint Black - Hard Way (Acoustic Guitar, Electric Guitar)
- Ricky Van Shelton - Greatest Hits Plus (Acoustic Guitar)
- Moe Bandy - Greatest Hits (Acoustic Guitar, Electric Guitar)
- Brendan Croker - Great Indoors (Acoustic Guitar, Electric Guitar)
- Carman - Comin' On Strong (Acoustic Guitar)

1991

- Hank Williams, Jr. - Pure Hank - Vol. 19 (Acoustic Guitar)
- Mark O'Connor - New Nashville Cats (Acoustic Guitar)
- Holly Dunn - Milestones - Greatest Hits (Acoustic Guitar)
- Hank Williams, Jr. - Maverick (Acoustic Guitar)
- Bob Seger - Fire Inside (Acoustic Guitar)
- The Judds - Love Can Build A Bridge (Acoustic Guitar, Electric Guitar, Rhythm Guitar, Bandleader, Assistant Producer)

1990

- Pinkard & Bowden - Live (Acoustic Guitar)
- The Judds - River Of Time (Acoustic Guitar, Electric Guitar, Bandleader)
- Lorrie Morgan - Leave The Light On (Acoustic Guitar)

1988

- The Judds - Greatest Hits (Acoustic Guitar, Rhythm Guitar, Bandleader, Background Vocals )

1987

- Ricky Van Shelton - Wild-Eyed Dream (Acoustic Guitar)
- Reba McEntire - Last One To Know (Acoustic Guitar)
- The Judds - Heartland (Acoustic Guitar, Electric Guitar, Rhythm Guitar, Bandleader)

1986

- Reba McEntire - What Am I Gonna Do About You (Acoustic Guitar)

1985

- The Judds - Rockin' With The Rhythm (Acoustic Guitar, Rhythm Guitar, Bandleader)

1984

- Carman - Comin’ On Strong, "Light of Jesus to the World" (Acoustic Guitar)
- The Judds - Why Not Me (Acoustic Guitar, Rhythm Guitar, Bandleader)

1982

- Chuck Mangione - 70 Miles Young (Vocals on Feels So Good)

1981

- Don Potter - "Don Potter" (Acoustic Guitar)

1978

- Don Potter - "Over the Rainbow" (Acoustic Guitar)
- Chuck Mangione - Children of Sanchez (Vocals)

1977

- Raffi - Adult Entertainment (Producer, Acoustic Guitar, Electric Guitar, Kalimba, Backing Vocals)

1975

- Dan Hill - Dan Hill (Acoustic Guitar, Vocals)

1973

- Chuck Mangione - Land Of Make Believe (Acoustic Guitar, Electric Guitar, Electric Piano)

1972

- Chuck Mangione - Together: A New Chuck Mangione Concert (Acoustic Guitar, Harmonica, Vocals)

1971

- Chuck Mangione - Friends and Love - a Chuck Mangione Concert (Acoustic Guitar, Harmonica, Vocals)

1969

- Bat McGrath and Don Potter - Introducing Bat McGrath & Don Potter (Acoustic Guitar, Vocals)
