= Jeanie Bryson =

American singer (born 1958)

- Born: March 10, 1958; New York City, New York, U.S.
- Died: June 19, 2026 (aged 68) New York City, New York, U.S.
- Genres: Jazz, pop, Latin
- Occupation: Singer
- Years active: 1993–2026
- Labels: Koch, Telarc
- Spouse: Coleman Mellett (m. 2004; died 2009)

Jeanie Bryson (March 10, 1958 - June 19, 2026) was an American singer who sings a combination of jazz, pop, and Latin music. Her repertoire is based on jazz and pop standards from the Great American Songbook, Peggy Lee and Dinah Washington.

== Life and career ==
Bryson was the daughter of composer Connie Bryson and trumpeter Dizzy Gillespie. Her paternity was kept a secret until after Gillespie's death because he was married, but she occasionally saw him growing up. In 1998 Bryson filed a lawsuit against his widow, Lorraine Willis Gillespie, after her lawyer found court records from 1965 in which Gillespie admitted he was her father. She reached a settlement with his estate. When describing her father, Bryson once stated: "He was not the traditional dad, not at all. Let’s just put it this way: I remember being 18, going to see him in a club, going out to a van that was parked outside, and sharing a joint with him."

Bryson grew up in East Brunswick, New Jersey. She began playing instruments at a young age, piano in first grade and then flute in fifth grade. Bryson attended East Brunswick High School. She studied anthropology and ethnomusicology at Livingston College, Rutgers University, graduating in 1981. That year, she performed with her father in Salem County, singing "God Bless the Child" by Billie Holiday. After college she worked in a post office during the week and sang on weekends, by the end of the 1980s she was singing full-time. Bryson released her debut album, I Love Being Here with You, on Telarc in 1993. Her mother contributed the lyrics to two songs on the album. Bryson also sang on an album by Terence Blanchard devoted to Billie Holiday songs.

Bryson has a son, Radji Birks Bryson-Barrett, from the first of her three marriages. Her husband, guitarist Coleman Mellett (married 2004) died in the February 2009 crash of Colgan Air Flight 3407. The couple lived in East Brunswick, New Jersey.

Bryson died from an aggressive form of cancer June 19, 2026 at Memorial Sloan Kettering Hospital in New York.

== Discography ==
Year	Title	Genre	Label	Notes
1993	I Love Being Here with You	Jazz	Telarc	
1994	Tonight I Need You So	Jazz	Telarc	
1996	Some Cats Know: Jeanie Bryson Sings Songs of Peggy Lee	Jazz	Telarc	
2001	Deja Blue	Jazz	Koch	
2006	Live at the Warsaw Jamboree Jazz Festival 1991	Jazz	Import	
