= Feels So Good (Chuck Mangione album) =

Studio album by Chuck Mangione
- Released: December 8, 1977
- Studio: Kendun Recorders (Burbank, California)
- Genre: Smooth jazz; easy listening
- Length: 45:55
- Label: A&M
- Producer: Chuck Mangione

Chuck Mangione chronology
Main Squeeze (1976)	Feels So Good (1977)	An Evening of Magic, Live at the Hollywood Bowl (1978)

Singles from Feels So Good
- 1. "Feels So Good" Released: February 1978

Professional ratings
Review scores
Source	Rating
AllMusic	4/5 stars

Feels So Good is a 1977 jazz album released by Chuck Mangione. It contains his hit single, the title song "Feels So Good", an edited form of which reached No. 4 on the U.S. charts. The track also reached the top of the Billboard adult contemporary chart. It was also frequently referenced on the animated television comedy King of the Hill, on which Mangione had a recurring voice role as himself.

== Background ==
The album Feels So Good peaked at No. 2 on the Billboard albums chart in 1978, behind the Saturday Night Fever soundtrack.

== Track listing ==
All selections written by Chuck Mangione.

1. "Feels So Good" – 9:42
2. "Maui-Waui" – 10:13
3. "Theme from Side Street" – 2:05
4. "Hide and Seek (Ready or Not Here I Come)" – 6:25
5. "Last Dance" – 10:54
6. "The XIth Commandment" – 6:36

== Charts ==
=== Weekly charts ===
Chart (1978)	Peak position
Australia Albums (Kent Music Report)	59
New Zealand Albums (RMNZ)	19
US Billboard 200	2

=== Year-end charts ===
Chart (1978)	Position
US Billboard 200	6

== Certifications ==
Certifications for Feels So Good
Region	Certification	Certified units/sales
United States (RIAA)	2× Platinum	2,000,000^{^}
^{^} Shipments figures based on certification alone.

== Musicians ==
- Chuck Mangione – flugelhorn, electric piano
- Chris Vadala – baritone saxophone, soprano saxophone, tenor saxophone, alto flute, flute, piccolo flute
- Grant Geissman – electric guitars, acoustic guitar, 12-string guitar, classical guitar
- Charles Meeks – bass
- James Bradley, Jr. – drums, congas, timbales

=== Production ===
- Chuck Mangione – producer, arrangements
- Mick Guzauski – engineer
- Stillman Kelly – assistant engineer
- Rick Collins – mastering
- Roland Young – art direction
- Junie Osaki – design
- Benno Friedman – photography
- Tom Iannaccone – management
