= St. Louis Symphony Youth Orchestra =

The St. Louis Symphony Youth Orchestra (SLSYO) is an American orchestra for musicians between the ages of 12 and 22, and is the young people's version of the St. Louis Symphony Orchestra (SLSO). The SLSYO performs three concerts a year at Powell Symphony Hall in St. Louis, Missouri.

The orchestra was founded in 1970 by Leonard Slatkin when he was assistant conductor of the SLSO. The assistant conductor (now called resident conductor) of the SLSO acts as the music director of the SLSYO. The current resident conductor of the St. Louis Symphony is Stephanie Childress. Past SLSYO music directors have included Gerhardt Zimmermann, Ward Stare, Steven Jarvi, Kirk Muspratt, David Loebel, David Amado and Scott Parkman. Several of the SLSYO's past members have joined the SLSO in future years, including Mark Sparks (flute), Felicia Foland (bassoon), Rebecca Boyer Hall and Kristin Ahlstrom (violin), Erin Schreiber (violin) and Sarah Hogan Kaiser (double bass).

In 2020, the SLSYO celebrated its 50th anniversary.
