= Oscar Lewis =

American anthropologist (1914-1970)

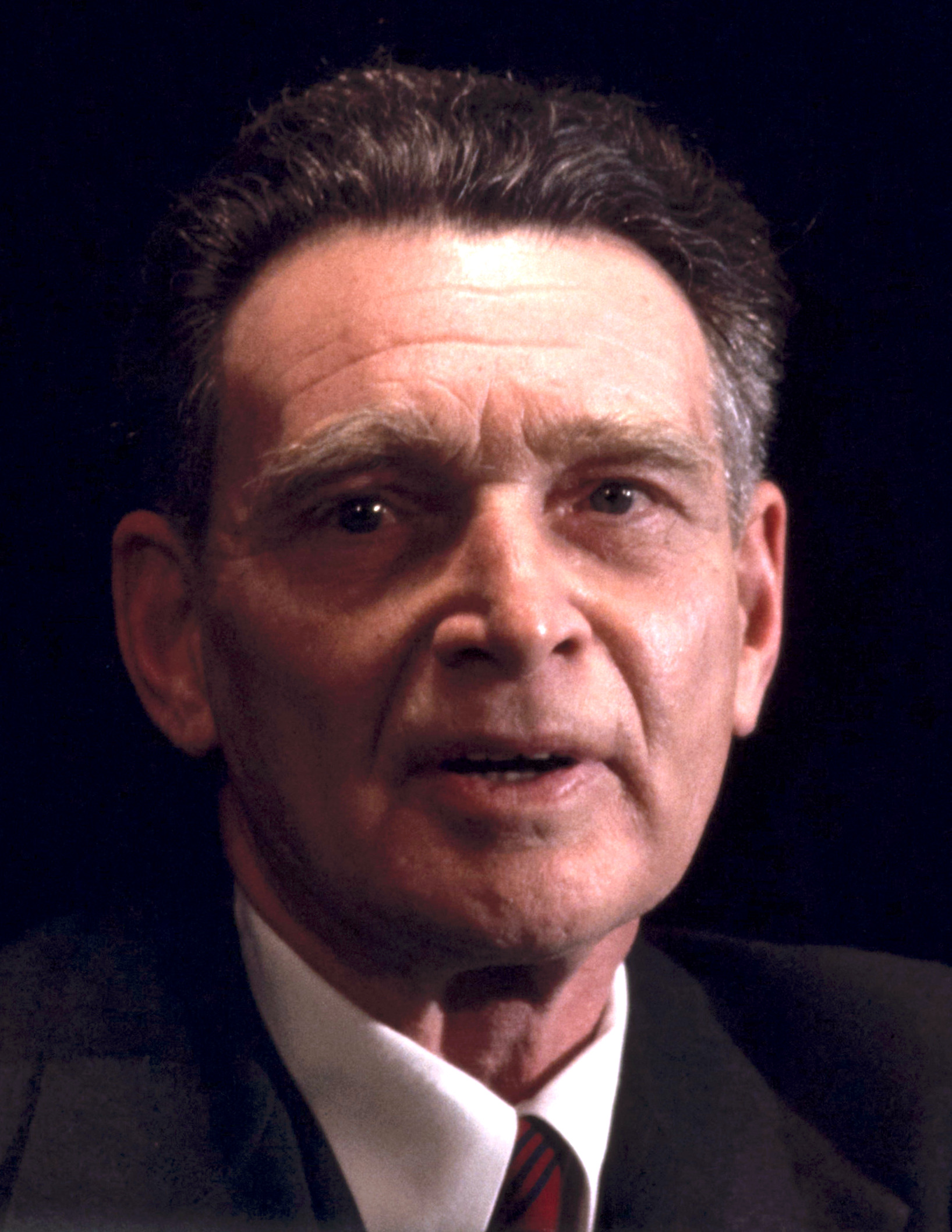
Lewis, circa 1970

Oscar Lewis, born Lefkowitz (December 25, 1914 – December 16, 1970) was an American anthropologist. He is best known for his vivid depictions of the lives of slum dwellers and his argument that a cross-generational culture of poverty transcends national boundaries. Lewis contended that the cultural similarities occurred because they were "common adaptations to common problems" and that "the culture of poverty is both an adaptation and a reaction of the poor classes to their marginal position in a class-stratified, highly individualistic, capitalistic society." He won the 1967 U.S. National Book Award in Science, Philosophy and Religion for La vida: a Puerto Rican family in the culture of poverty--San Juan and New York.

== Early life and education ==
Lewis was Jewish, the son of a rabbi, born 1914 in New York City and raised on a small farm in upstate New York. He received a bachelor's degree in history in 1936 from City College of New York, where he met his future wife and research associate, Ruth Maslow. As a graduate student at Columbia University, he became dissatisfied with the History Department at Columbia. At the suggestion of his brother-in-law, Abraham Maslow, Lewis had a conversation with Ruth Benedict of the Anthropology Department. He switched departments and then received a Ph.D. in anthropology from Columbia in 1940. His Ph.D. dissertation on the effects of contact with white people on the Blackfeet Indians was published in 1942.

== Career ==
Lewis taught at Brooklyn College, and Washington University in St. Louis, and helped to found the anthropology department at the University of Illinois Urbana-Champaign. His most controversial book was ‘La Vida’ that chronicled the life of Puerto Rican prostitute, living with her sixth husband, who was raising her children in conditions unimaginable to many middle-class American readers. Another well-known book was "The children of Sanchez" about an impoverished Mexico City family. Lewis died in New York City of heart failure, at age 55 in 1970, and was buried in New Montefiore Cemetery in West Babylon, Suffolk County, New York.

Lewis is best known for his "culture of poverty" social theory: The theory states that being subjected to conditions of poverty, will lead to a culture adapted thereto, characterized by pervasive feelings of helplessness, dependency, and powerlessness. Furthermore, Lewis describes individuals living within a culture of poverty, as lacking or having limited means or knowledge to alleviate their inferior social status, focusing instead on their current needs.

Nevertheless, the theory acknowledges factors leading to initial poverty, such as lack of available fair employment opportunities, proper free schooling, with decent social services and available standard housing. Thus, for Lewis, the mere imposition of poverty on a needy disadvantaged population, is the structural cause of specific cultural nature.

Autonomous in its behaviors and attitudes, this culture passes down to the subsequent generation. The theory further concludes that once a needy population is exposed to poverty, no charity or low-income allowances will alleviate its allied image of social inferiority. A poverty trap, for which blame, should be shifted from the poor themselves to those who may profit from a faulty economy.

== Books ==
- Village Life in Northern India; Studies in a Delhi village, 1958
- Five Families; Mexican Case Studies in the Culture of Poverty, 1959
- Life in a Mexican Village; Tepoztlán restudied, 1960 [first edition 1951]
- The Children of Sanchez, Autobiography of a Mexican Family, 1961
- Pedro Martinez - A Mexican Peasant and His Family, 1964
- La Vida; A Puerto Rican Family in the Culture of Poverty—San Juan and New York, 1966
- A Death in the Sánchez Family, 1969
