= Gap Mangione =

American jazz pianist

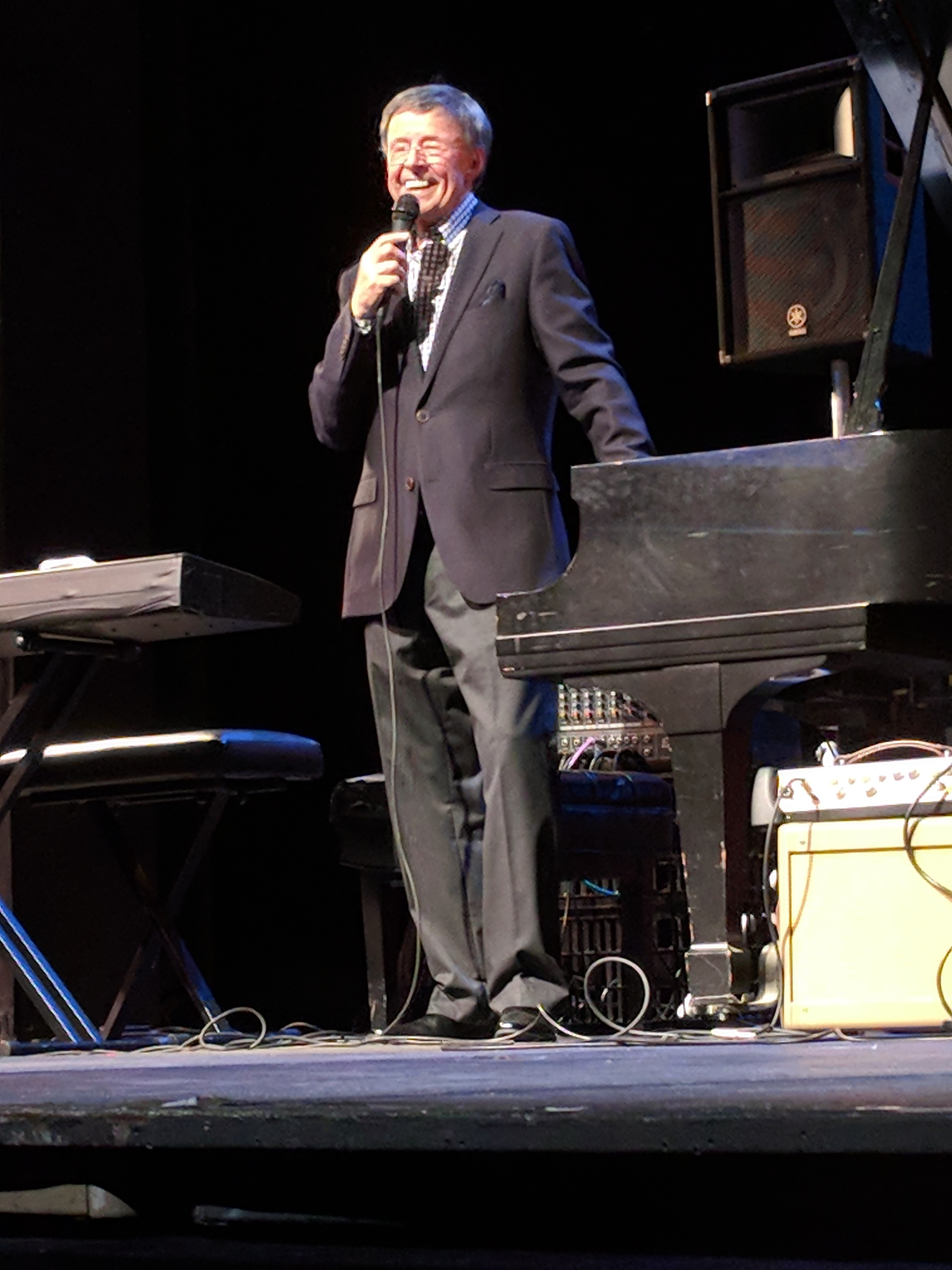
- Mangione at the 2018 Rochester Jazz Festival

Background information
- Born: Gaspare Charles Mangione; July 31, 1938 (age 88); Rochester, New York, United States
- Genres: Jazz
- Occupation: Pianist
- Years active: 1958–present
- Website: www.gapmangione.com

Gaspare Charles "Gap" Mangione (/mænˈdʒoʊni/ man-JOH-nee; born July 31, 1938) is a jazz pianist from Rochester, New York. He is the brother of Chuck Mangione.

== Career ==
In 1958, Mangione and his brother started performing together as the Mangione Brothers Sextet/Quintet. From 1960–1961 they recorded three albums for Riverside as the Jazz Brothers.

In 1968, Mangione released his first solo album, Diana in the Autumn Wind, with drummer Steve Gadd and bassist Tony Levin in their first recordings, and compositions and arrangements by Chuck Mangione.

In 2004, Mangione received the Artist of the Year Award from the Arts & Cultural Council for Greater Rochester.

In 2015, Mangione was inducted into the Rochester Music Hall of Fame.

== Discography ==
=== As leader or co-leader ===
- The Jazz Brothers as the Mangione Brothers Sextet with Chuck Mangione (Riverside, 1960)
- Hey Baby! as the Jazz Brothers with Chuck Mangione (Riverside, 1961)
- Spring Fever as the Jazz Brothers with Chuck Mangione, Sal Nistico (Riverside, 1961)
- Diana in the Autumn Wind (GRC, 1968), reissued on CD 2003, rereleased 2026 on vinyl (Be With, London, UK)
- Sing Along Junk (Mercury, 1972)
- ...And the Kids Call It Boogie (Sagoma, 1974)
- She and I (A&M, 1974)
- Gap Mangione! (A&M, 1976)
- Suite Lady with Larry Carlton (A&M, 1978)
- Dancin' Is Making Love with Larry Carlton (A&M, 1979)
- The Boys from Rochester with Chuck Mangione, Steve Gadd, Joe Romano, Frank Pullara (Feels So Good, 1989)
- Planet Gap with the Big Band (Cafe/Josh Music, 1997)
- Stolen Moments with the Big Band (Josh Music, 2003)
- Family Holidays (Josh Music, 2004)
- Live in Toronto (Josh Music, 2015)

=== As sideman or guest ===
With Chuck Mangione

- Friends and Love (Mercury, 1970)
- Together: A New Chuck Mangione Concert (Mercury, 1971)
- Land of Make Believe (Mercury, 1973)
- Chase the Clouds Away (A&M, 1975)
- Bellavia (A&M, 1975)
- Tarantella (A&M, 1980)

With others

- Dixieland at the Roundtable, Salt City Six (Roulette, 1958)
- Wilmer and the Dukes, Wilmer & the Dukes (Aphrodisiac, 1969)
- Once I Loved, Esther Satterfield (Sagoma, 1974; reissued on A&M)

Sampled by major rappers

- Concrete Boys, Lil Yachty
- A Tribe Called Quest
- Chance the Rapper
- Ghostface Killah
- Guerilla Black
- Jadakiss
- Jaylib
- Kendrick Lamar
- People Under the Stairs
- J-Dilla/Slum Village
- Styles P
- Swizz Beatz
- Talib Kweli
