= Feels So Good (composition) =

Single by Chuck Mangione

from the album Feels So Good
- B-side: "Maui-Waui"
- Released: February 1978
- Recorded: 1977
- Genre: Smooth jazz; soft rock; disco
- Length: 3:31 (single version); 9:43 (album version)
- Label: A&M
- Songwriter: Chuck Mangione
- Producer: Chuck Mangione

Chuck Mangione singles chronology
"Hill Where the Lord Hides" (1978)	"Feels So Good" (1978)	"Children of Sanchez" (1978)

"Feels So Good" is an instrumental composition by the American flugelhorn player Chuck Mangione. It was written and produced by Mangione, and is the title track from his 1977 album Feels So Good.

"Feels So Good" was released as a single in early 1978, which reached number 4 on the Billboard Hot 100 chart in June of that year after spending a week atop the Billboard easy listening chart in May. The recording was also nominated for a Grammy Award for Record of the Year at the ceremony held in 1979, losing out to Billy Joel's "Just the Way You Are". Mangione re-recorded the tune (as a slow ballad, and with lyrics sung by Don Potter) for his 1982 album 70 Miles Young.

Mangione was quoted describing the editing of the original version of the track as "major surgery."

== Chart performance ==
=== Weekly charts ===
1978 weekly chart performance for "Feels So Good"
Chart (1978)	Peak position
Australia (Kent Music Report)	49
Canada Top Singles (RPM)	5
Canada Adult Contemporary (RPM)	1
New Zealand (RIANZ)	5
US Billboard Hot 100	4
US Easy Listening (Billboard)	1
US Hot Soul Singles (Billboard)	68
US Cash Box Top 100	6

2025 weekly chart performance for "Feels So Good"
Chart (2025)	Peak position
US Digital Song Sales (Billboard)	21

=== Year-end charts ===
Year-end chart performance for "Feels So Good"
Chart (1978)	Position
Canada Top Singles (RPM)	32
Billboard Hot 100	21
US Cash Box Top 100	39

== Personnel ==
- Chuck Mangione: Flugelhorn & electric piano
- Chris Vadala: Saxophones
- Grant Geissman: Guitar
- Charles Meeks: Electric Bass
- James Bradley, Jr.: Drums

== In popular culture ==
Mangione appeared in a commercial for Memorex in 1979 performing "Feels So Good". Ella Fitzgerald, who famously appeared in Memorex commercials during the 1970s, heard Mangione and musicians perform it, then it was played back for her. When she was asked "is it live or is it Memorex?", Ella shrugged and said, "beats me!"

The composition was heard frequently in King of the Hill, including a running gag in which Mangione (who often guest starred on the show as himself) worked it into whatever he was playing.

The jazz-classical fusion duo Marimolin covered "Feels So Good" (arranged for marimba and violin) on their 1994 album Combo Platter.

The Friends episode "The One with All the Haste" begins and ends with scenes in which a neighbour across the alley from apartment 19 sings a song about the morningtime loudly to himself first thing in the morning, much to the annoyance of Rachel, but to the pleasure of Joey. The song uses the melody from "Feels So Good".

In The Big Bang Theory episode "The Relaxation Integration", the song is briefly played by Sheldon Cooper in a dream.

"Feels So Good" was heard in the 2016 film Doctor Strange in a scene where Dr. Stephen Strange responds to trivia questions while performing surgery.

A portion of "Feels So Good" is heard in the 2009 film Zombieland at the gas station scene as Columbus is driving away from two zombies.

== See also ==
- List of number-one adult contemporary singles of 1978 (U.S.)
