= The Children of Sanchez (book) =

1961 book by Oscar Lewis

- First edition
- Author: Oscar Lewis
- Publisher: Random House
- Publication date: 1961

The Children of Sanchez is a 1961 book by American anthropologist Oscar Lewis about a Mexican family living in the Mexico City slum of Tepito, which he studied as part of his program to develop his concept of culture of poverty. The book is subtitled "Autobiography of a Mexican family". According to the dedication by the author in the opening pages of the book, the actual last name of the family is not "Sanchez", in order to maintain the privacy of the family members.

Due to criticisms expressed by members of the family regarding the Partido Revolucionario Institucional (PRI) government and Mexican presidents such as Adolfo Ruiz Cortines and Adolfo López Mateos, and its being written by a foreigner, the book was banned in Mexico for a few years before pressure from literary figures resulted in its publication.

The particular ethnographic reality that Lewis is focussing on in his book was the plight of the urban poor in a developing country. The political implications of this approach caused some concern when The Children of Sánchez was published in Mexico in Spanish in 1964. Formal charges were made against Lewis and the publisher by the Mexican Geographical and Statistical Society, accusing them of writing and publishing an obscene and denigrating book. The hearing of the case, the text of which was appended to the second Mexican edition by Joaquín Mortiz, resulted in the dismissal of the charges against Lewis and the publisher as unfounded.

Jesús Sánchez, age fifty, is the father, and his four children are Manuel, age thirty-two; Roberto, twenty-nine; Consuelo, twenty-seven; and Marta, twenty-five. The content of the book itself consists of the life stories and accounts of these five people, as recorded in their own words by the author. Most of the interviews and the recorded events center around the Casa Grande Vecindad, a large one-story slum settlement, in the center of Mexico City. Elizabeth Hardwick described the result as "a moving, strange tragedy, not an interview, a questionnaire or a sociological study."

== Film ==
A film based on the book and with the same title was directed by Hall Bartlett and was released in 1979. It stars Anthony Quinn as Jesús Sánchez.
