= Eastman Theatre =

Concert hall in Rochester, New York

- The facade of the Eastman Theatre
- Interactive map of Eastman Theatre
- Address: 26 Gibbs Street
- Location: Rochester, New York, U.S.
- Coordinates: 43.1572°N 77.5985°W
- Owner: University of Rochester
- Operator: Eastman School of Music
- Capacity: 2,326 (Kodak Hall); 444 (Kilbourn Hall); 222 (Hatch Recital Hall)
- Type: Concert hall

Construction
- Opened: September 4, 1922
- Architects: McKim, Mead & White; Gordon & Kaelber

Website
- esm.rochester.edu

The Eastman Theatre is a concert hall located at 26 Gibbs Street in Rochester, New York, United States. Since 2009, the main auditorium has been formally known as Kodak Hall at Eastman Theatre. Opened on September 4, 1922, the theatre was built by industrialist and philanthropist George Eastman, founder of the Eastman Kodak Company, to serve as the home of the Eastman School of Music and as a cultural center for the Rochester community.

Designed by the New York City firm of McKim, Mead & White in association with the Rochester firm of Gordon & Kaelber, the theatre is built in the Italian Renaissance and Neo-Classical style with Beaux-Arts massing. The building houses three performance spaces: the 2,326-seat Kodak Hall, the 444-seat Kilbourn Hall, and the 222-seat Hatch Recital Hall. The Eastman Theatre has served as the primary concert venue of the Rochester Philharmonic Orchestra since 1930 and is the main performance hall of the Eastman School of Music, a professional school of the University of Rochester.

The theatre was listed on the National Register of Historic Places in 1986. The facade bears the inscription "For the enrichment of community life," reflecting George Eastman's vision for the building.

== History ==
=== Founding ===
George Eastman, who had no formal musical training, became a devoted patron of music in Rochester in the early 20th century. He established the Eastman School of Music in 1921 as the first professional school of the University of Rochester and commissioned the construction of the Eastman Theatre as its home and as a public venue for music and film. Eastman's stated purpose was to bring music and cinema to the broadest possible audience in Rochester, a city of approximately 300,000 at the time. When completed, the Eastman Theatre was the third-largest theatre in the United States for a city of its size.

=== Opening night ===
The Eastman Theatre opened to the public on the evening of September 4, 1922 (Labor Day). The opening program featured conductors Arthur Alexander and Victor Wagner leading the Eastman Theatre Orchestra and included a screening of the silent film The Prisoner of Zenda (1922). Will H. Hays, president of the Motion Picture Producers and Distributors of America, attended the opening festivities. Admission prices started at as little as 20 cents, and more than 10,000 tickets were sold on opening day.

=== Silent film era (1922–1930) ===
During its first eight years, the Eastman Theatre operated as both a concert hall and a first-run movie palace, fulfilling George Eastman's vision of pairing symphonic music with motion pictures. The Eastman Theatre Orchestra, an ensemble of approximately 70 musicians, performed live orchestral accompaniments to silent films under the direction of conductor Victor Wagner. For a period, the theatre was operated under the Publix Theatres chain. With the advent of sound film and the end of the silent era, the theatre transitioned exclusively to concert use around 1930.

=== Concert hall era ===
George Eastman had also founded the Rochester Philharmonic Orchestra (RPO) in 1922, with Eugene Goossens and Albert Coates serving as its first principal conductors. The RPO gave its debut performance on March 28, 1923, and following the end of the silent film era, the Eastman Theatre became the orchestra's permanent home in 1930.

Under Howard Hanson, who served as director of the Eastman School of Music for 40 years (1924–1964), the theatre became a center for the performance and premiere of American music. Hanson premiered more than 2,000 works by over 500 American composers during his tenure.

The Eastman Theatre and the Eastman School of Music were jointly inducted into the Rochester Music Hall of Fame as part of the Class of 2022, coinciding with the centennial of both institutions.

== Architecture ==
=== Exterior ===
The Eastman Theatre was designed by the prominent New York City architectural firm of McKim, Mead & White in collaboration with the Rochester firm of Gordon & Kaelber. The building is designed in the Italian Renaissance and Neo-Classical style with Beaux-Arts massing.

The structure measures approximately 367 feet along Gibbs Street and East Main Street, 180 feet deep, and stands 80 feet tall. The upper stories are clad in gray Indiana limestone, while the lower levels feature rusticated stonework. Vermont marble Ionic pilasters and columns frame the main entrance. A full-length marquise (canopy) extends across the front facade. The inscription "For the enrichment of community life" is carved into the facade above the entrance, expressing George Eastman's philanthropic intent for the building.

=== Interior ===
The interior of the main auditorium follows a blue and gold color scheme and is decorated with an extensive program of murals, bas-reliefs, and ornamental plasterwork.

The original seating capacity was approximately 3,352; successive renovations have reduced the current capacity to 2,326.

=== Murals and decorative art ===
The theatre's interior features significant works by several prominent American artists of the early 20th century. Ezra Winter painted the polychrome ceiling of the main auditorium and executed four large murals on the left wall of the hall, titled "Festival Music," "Lyric Music," "Martial Music," and "Sylvan Music." Barry Faulkner painted four complementary murals on the right wall, depicting "Religious Music," "Hunting Music," "Pastoral Music," and "Dramatic Music."

Above the murals, sculptor C. Paul Jennewein created a series of bas-reliefs depicting children and musical instruments.

The artist Maxfield Parrish contributed a large mural titled Interlude (also known as The Lute Players), which hung in the north stairway of the theatre from 1922 to 1994. The mural is now on permanent loan to the Memorial Art Gallery of the University of Rochester. An image of the painting was reproduced on a United States postage stamp in 2001.

=== Chandelier ===
The main auditorium features a large crystal chandelier comprising approximately 20,000 individual pieces sourced from Italy and the Czech Republic. The chandelier measures 14 feet in diameter, stands 35 feet tall, weighs approximately 2.5 tons, and is illuminated by 546 lights.

== Organs ==
=== Main organ ===
The original main organ of the Eastman Theatre was built by the Austin Organ Company of Hartford, Connecticut, as Opus 1010 and installed for the theatre's 1922 opening. At the time of its installation, it was the largest theatre organ ever built, with 229 stops on four manuals. The organ's specifications were drafted by Harold Gleason at George Eastman's request.

The organ was rebuilt in 1951, at which time it was reduced to 134 ranks and its theatre-style traps and sound effects were removed. The instrument was removed from the theatre in 1971. The console was subsequently installed at the Cathedral-Basilica of Saints Peter and Paul in Philadelphia in 1977.

=== Kilbourn Hall organ ===
Kilbourn Hall houses an Ernest M. Skinner organ, Opus 325, also installed in 1922. With 6,030 pipes, 91 ranks, and 83 stops, it is the largest pipe organ in Rochester. The instrument was designed by Harold Gleason and the French organist Joseph Bonnet.

The organ fell into disrepair over the decades, and public use was discontinued in 2004. A planned restoration is being undertaken under the Eastman Rochester Organ Initiative (EROI), a program of the Eastman School of Music.

== Kilbourn Hall ==
Kilbourn Hall is a 444-seat chamber music venue located within the Eastman Theatre complex. Opened in 1922, the hall was dedicated to the memory of Maria Kilbourn Eastman, George Eastman's mother. The three-story hall is designed in the Venetian Renaissance style and is considered one of the world's finest chamber music halls.

== Renovations ==
=== 1970s renovation ===
The first major renovation of the Eastman Theatre took place in the 1970s and included the installation of new seating, lighting, and electrical systems, as well as the theatre's first air conditioning system. The chandelier's original bulbs were replaced, and the auditorium murals by Ezra Winter and Barry Faulkner were professionally cleaned.

=== 2004 concert shell ===
In 2004, a $14 million project installed a new concert shell in the main auditorium. The new shell, designed by CJS Architects with Fisher Dachs Associates as theatre consultants and Akustiks as acoustical consultants, measures 50 feet tall and weighs 60,000 pounds.

=== 2009 Kodak Hall renovation ===
In 2008, the Eastman Kodak Company announced a $10 million donation to the Eastman School of Music, the largest corporate gift in the school's history at the time. In recognition of the gift, the main auditorium was renamed Kodak Hall at Eastman Theatre in 2009. The renovation reduced seating from 3,094 to 2,326 by removing approximately 800 orchestra-level seats and reshaping the auditorium walls to improve acoustics and sight lines.

Additional funding for the renovation was provided by the Davenport-Hatch Foundation, which contributed $2.5 million.

=== 2010 East Wing addition ===
In 2010, the Eastman School of Music opened a new six-story east wing addition, completing the building program originally envisioned by George Eastman in the 1920s. The addition includes the 222-seat Hatch Recital Hall and the Wolk Atrium, a 73-foot skylit lobby featuring a 19-foot Dale Chihuly chandelier. The total cost of the combined renovation and addition project was approximately $46.9 million.

== Notable performances ==
The Eastman Theatre has hosted a wide range of prominent musicians, conductors, and public figures over its history. Conductors who have performed at the theatre include Leonard Bernstein, Georg Solti, Christoph von Dohnanyi, and Leonard Slatkin. Composers Igor Stravinsky, Sergei Rachmaninoff, and John Williams have appeared at the venue. Jazz musicians who have performed at the Eastman Theatre include Bob Brookmeyer, Stan Getz, Keith Jarrett, and Wynton Marsalis.

The Metropolitan Opera performed at the Eastman Theatre annually for nearly three decades.

Winston Churchill delivered a speech at the Eastman Theatre in 1932.

In September 2022, the Eastman School of Music and the Rochester Philharmonic Orchestra jointly presented a centennial concert marking the 100th anniversary of the theatre's opening.

== Connection to Eastman School of Music ==
The Eastman School of Music was established in 1921 by George Eastman as the first professional school of the University of Rochester. The school's first director was Alfred Klingenberg, who served from 1921 to 1923. He was succeeded by Howard Hanson, who led the institution for 40 years (1924–1964) and is credited with establishing it as one of the leading conservatories in the United States.

The Eastman School of Music enrolls more than 900 students and employs more than 130 faculty members. The school presents more than 900 concerts annually across its three performance venues in the Eastman Theatre complex.

The school and theatre were jointly inducted into the Rochester Music Hall of Fame as part of the Class of 2022.

== See also ==
- Eastman School of Music
- Rochester Philharmonic Orchestra
- George Eastman
- McKim, Mead & White
- Gordon & Kaelber
- University of Rochester
- National Register of Historic Places listings in Rochester, New York
- Opera Theatre of Rochester
