= Esther Satterfield =

American jazz singer (born 1946)

- Born: Esther Satterfield; 1946 (age 79–80); North Carolina, United States
- Genres: Jazz
- Occupations: Singer, songwriter
- Labels: Sagoma, A&M, Mercury

Esther Satterfield (born 1946) is an American jazz singer. She is best known as the vocalist for the title songs of Chuck Mangione's albums Land of Make Believe (1973) and Chase the Clouds Away (1975).

Satterfield recorded and toured with Mangione during the 1970s, and released two solo albums, Once I Loved (1974) and Need to Be (1976), both produced by Chuck Mangione.
