= Children of Sanchez (album) =

Soundtrack album by Chuck Mangione
- Released: 1978
- Studio: Kendun Recorders (Burbank, CA)
- Genre: Jazz, crossover jazz, easy listening
- Length: 83:39
- Label: A&M
- Producer: Chuck Mangione

Chuck Mangione chronology
70 Miles Young (1978)	Children of Sanchez (1978)	Fun and Games (1979)

Professional ratings
Review scores
Source	Rating
AllMusic	2.5/5 stars

Children of Sanchez is the sixteenth overall album by jazz artist Chuck Mangione. It is also the soundtrack to the 1978 film The Children of Sanchez. Chuck Mangione won a Grammy for Best Pop Instrumental Performance for the title song, "Children of Sanchez". The title track is sung by Don Potter.

== Track listing ==
All songs written by Chuck Mangione:

Disc One
No.	Title	Length
1.	"Children of Sanchez (Overture)"	14:09
2.	"Lullabye"	3:52
3.	"Fanfare"	1:09
4.	"Pilgrimage, Pt. 1"	3:00
5.	"Pilgrimage, Pt. 2"	2:41
6.	"Consuelo's Love Theme"	17:02

Disc Two
No.	Title	Length
1.	"Hot Consuelo"	4:04
2.	"Death Scene"	4:44
3.	"Market Place"	3:12
4.	"Echano"	2:43
5.	"Bellavia"	3:16
6.	"Lullabye (Vocal Version)"	3:42
7.	"Medley"	8:22
8.	"B'bye"	8:30
9.	"Children of Sanchez (Finale)"	3:06
Total length:		83:39

== Certifications ==
Region	Certification	Certified units/sales
Poland (ZPAV)	Platinum	20,000^{*}
United States (RIAA)	Gold	500,000^{^}
^{*} Sales figures based on certification alone.^{^} Shipments figures based on certification alone.

== Personnel ==
Musicians

- James Bradley Jr. - Drums
- Dick Decker - French horn
- Grant Geissman - Guitars
- Chuck Mangione - Flugelhorn, electric and acoustic pianos
- Charles Meeks - Bass guitar
- Jerry Peel - French horn
- Don Potter - Vocal
- Phyllis Hyman - Vocal
- George Stimpson - French horn
- Jeff Tyzik - Trumpet, flugelhorn
- Ron Leonard - cello
- Chris Vadala - Clarinet, flutes, soprano sax, tenor sax
- Brad Warnaar - French horn
- Bill Reichenbach, Jr. - Bass Trombone
- Kai Winding - Trombone
- Mayo Tiana - Trombone
- Dana Hughes - Trombone

Production

- Dave Collins - Digital remastering
- Michael Frondelli - Assistant engineer
- Mick Guzauski - Editing, engineer, mixing
- Stillman Kelly - Assistant engineer
- Donald Potter - Editing, mixing
- Larry Swist - Assistant engineer
- Jeff Tyzik - Associate producer, coordination, string arrangements
- Gerald Vinci - Concert master, editing
