= Chuck Mangione =

American jazz musician (1940–2025)

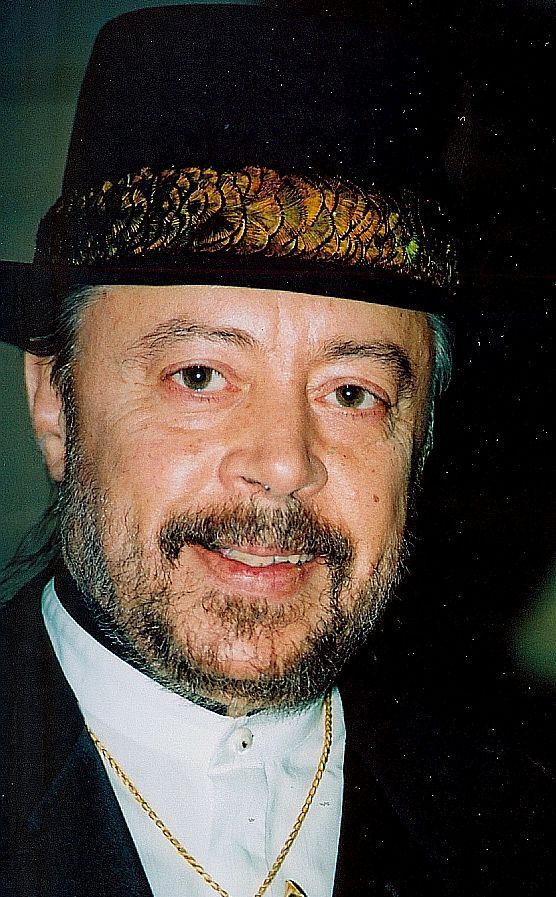
- Mangione in Washington, D.C., 1998

Background information
- Born: Charles Frank Mangione; November 29, 1940; Rochester, New York, U.S.
- Died: July 22, 2025 (aged 84) Rochester, New York, U.S.
- Genres: Jazz; jazz fusion; smooth jazz; jazz funk
- Occupations: Musician; composer
- Instruments: Flugelhorn; trumpet
- Years active: 1960–2015
- Labels: Mercury; A&M; Columbia; Chesky
- Website: chuckmangione.com

Charles Frank Mangione (/mænˈdʒoʊni/ man-JOH-nee; November 29, 1940 – July 22, 2025) was an American flugelhorn player, trumpeter, actor, and composer. He came to prominence as a member of Art Blakey's band in the 1960s, and later co-led the Jazz Brothers with his brother, Gap, achieving international success in 1978 with his jazz-pop single "Feels So Good". He released more than 30 albums, beginning in the 1960s. He also appeared in various television shows, including a recurring role on King of the Hill.

== Early life ==
Mangione was born to Italian-American parents on November 29, 1940, in Rochester, New York, where he grew up. His parents were jazz enthusiasts who owned a grocery store, Mangione Grocery. While at elementary school Mangione began music lessons, beginning with piano, but later switching to trumpet after watching the film Young Man with a Horn. With his pianist brother, Gap, he started a band in high school and played in sessions with Dizzy Gillespie and Miles Davis.

== Career ==
Mangione played with Art Blakey's band in the 1960s. He and his brother led the Mangione Brothers Sextet/Quintet, who recorded three albums for Riverside Records before Mangione branched out with other work. One of his compositions for the Mangione Brothers Sextet, "Something Different", was recorded by Cannonball Adderley on Adderley's 1961 album African Waltz. Mangione attended the Eastman School of Music in Rochester from 1958 to 1963 where he started playing the flugelhorn. He then joined Art Blakey's Jazz Messengers, filling the trumpet chair previously held by Clifford Brown, Freddie Hubbard, Kenny Dorham, Bill Hardman, and Lee Morgan.

In the late 1960s, Mangione was a member of the National Gallery, a band. In 1968, the band released the album Performing Musical Interpretations of the Paintings of Paul Klee. He served as the director of the Eastman jazz ensemble from 1968 to 1972. In 1970, he recorded the album Friends and Love in concert with the Rochester Philharmonic Orchestra and guest performers. Mangione's quartet with saxophonist Gerry Niewood was a popular concert and recording act throughout the 1970s. "Bellavia", recorded during the collaboration won Mangione his first Grammy Award in 1977 in the category Best Instrumental Composition. "Bellavia" was used by WHAS-TV in Louisville, Kentucky as background music for school closings; it was first used during the Blizzard of 1978.

In addition to his quartet with Niewood, Mangione had much success with his later-1970s ensemble, with Chris Vadala on saxophones and flutes, Grant Geissman on guitars, Charles Meeks on bass guitar, and James Bradley Jr. on drums. This version of Mangione's band recorded and toured behind the hit studio albums Feels So Good and Fun and Games and the Children of Sanchez soundtrack. Some band members participated in the "Tarantella" benefit concert in 1980. The song "Feels So Good" became a rare instrumental Top Ten hit, reaching No. 4 on the Billboard Hot 100 in 1978.

Mangione's composition "Chase the Clouds Away" was used at the 1976 Summer Olympics in Montreal, Quebec. His composition "Give It All You Got" was the theme to the 1980 Winter Olympic Games in Lake Placid, New York. He performed it live on a global television broadcast at the closing ceremonies. In 1978, Mangione composed the soundtrack for the film The Children of Sanchez starring Anthony Quinn. This album won him his second Grammy, in the category Best Pop Instrumental performance in 1979. In 1980, Current Biography, a magazine, called "Feels So Good" the most recognized tune since "Michelle" by the Beatles. With the ticket sales from his 60th-birthday concert held in 2000 at Rochester's Eastman Theatre, Mangione raised more than $50,000 for St. John's Nursing Home.

In 2009, Gerry Niewood and Coleman Mellett, two members of Mangione's band, were killed in the crash of Colgan Air Flight 3407 outside of Buffalo, New York.

Mangione retired in 2015 and sold his copyrights to Primary Wave in 2024.

== Acting career and television appearances ==
In addition to music, Mangione made occasional acting appearances in television shows including Magnum, P.I. and Sharon, Lois & Bram's Elephant Show on CBC. He had a recurring role on the animated television series King of the Hill as a fictional version of himself, being a celebrity spokesman for the big box store "Mega Lo Mart". Mangione said he had been approached with a script several months before the series debut in 1997, and enjoyed the "great exposure" his role had in expanding his potential audience. His 2000 album Everything For Love contains a track titled "Peggy Hill" as an homage to the series.

== Personal life and death ==
Mangione's wife, Rosemarie, died in 2015. He had two daughters, Nancy and Diana, and was a great-grandfather.

On July 22, 2025, Mangione died in his sleep at his Rochester home, at age 84.

== Discography ==
Mangione's recorded works include:

- The Jazz Brothers as the Mangione Brothers Sextet with Chuck Mangione (Riverside, 1960)
- Hey Baby! as the Jazz Brothers with Chuck Mangione (Riverside, 1961)
- Spring Fever as the Jazz Brothers with Chuck Mangione, Sal Nistico (Riverside, 1961)
- Recuerdo (Jazzland, 1962)
- Friends & Love...A Chuck Mangione Concert (Mercury, 1970)
- Together: A New Chuck Mangione Concert (Mercury, 1971)
- Alive! (Mercury, 1972)
- The Chuck Mangione Quartet (Mercury, 1972)
- Land of Make Believe (Mercury, 1973)
- Chase the Clouds Away (A&M, 1975)
- Bellavia (A&M, 1975)
- Main Squeeze (A&M, 1976)
- Feels So Good (A&M, 1977)
- Children of Sanchez (A&M, 1978)
- Fun and Games (A&M, 1979)
- An Evening of Magic, Live at the Hollywood Bowl (A&M, 1979)
- Tarantella (A&M, 1981)
- Love Notes (Columbia, 1982)
- 70 Miles Young (A&M, 1982)
- Journey to a Rainbow (Columbia, 1983)
- Disguise (Columbia, 1984)
- Save Tonight for Me (Columbia, 1986)
- Eyes of the Veiled Temptress (Columbia, 1988)
- Live at the Village Gate (Feels So Good, 1989)
- The Boys from Rochester (Feels So Good, 1989)
- The Hat's Back (Chuck Mangione, 1994)
- Together Forever with Steve Gadd (Chuck Mangione, 1994)
- The Feeling's Back (Chesky, 1999)
- Everything for Love (Chesky, 2000)
