= Grant Geissman =

American guitarist and composer (born 1953)

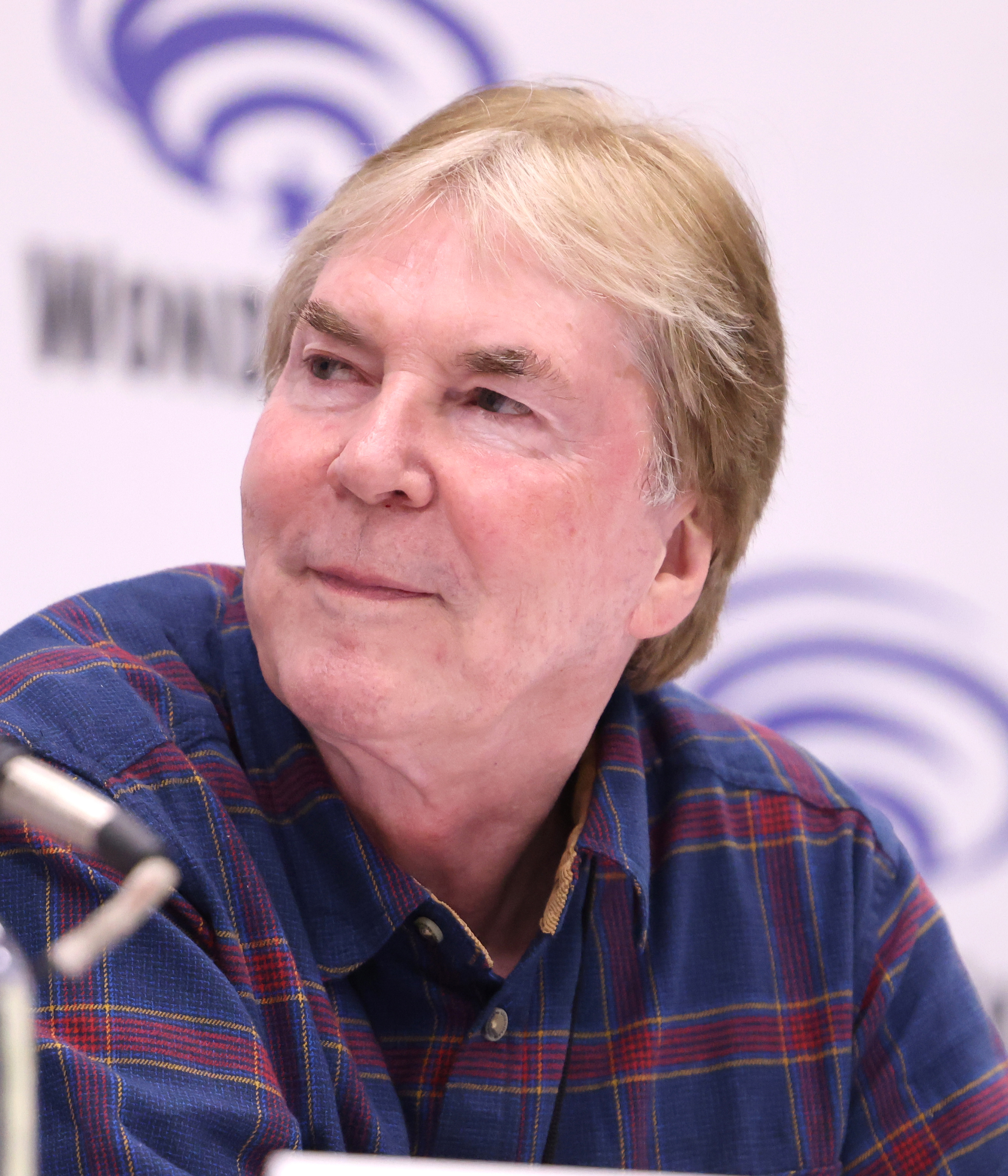
- Geissman in 2026

Background information
- Born: April 13, 1953 (age 73); Berkeley, California, U.S.
- Genres: Jazz, jazz fusion
- Occupations: Musician, composer
- Instrument: Guitar
- Years active: 1976–present
- Website: www.grantgeissman.com

Grant Geissman (born April 13, 1953) is an American jazz guitarist and Emmy-nominated composer. He has recorded extensively for several labels since 1976 and played guitar on the theme for Monk and other TV series.

== Career ==
Geissman was born in Berkeley, California and grew up in San Jose. When he was 11 years old, Geissman began his first guitar lesson with his private teacher Mrs. Allen. After his private tutoring was completed, he began taking guitar lessons from local musicians, such as Geoff Levin (of the pop group People!), Don Cirallo, Bud Dimock, and Terry Saunders. Encouraged by these teachers to learn jazz standards and to improvise, he began playing in rock bands on weekends and also with small jazz groups and big bands. As a high school senior, he entered formal study with avant-garde guitarist Jerry Hahn, who introduced him to the music of Charlie Parker, Miles Davis, John Coltrane, and Ornette Coleman.

After graduating from Prospect High School, Geissman attended De Anza College, where he played in both De Anza's jazz band and the Daddio Band (of older professionals). Both were led by jazz educator Herb Patnoe, who was the director of Stan Kenton's Jazz Clinics. Since the Kenton band at that time had no guitar player, Patnoe recommended Geissman to teach at Kenton's summer clinics in both Sacramento and in southern California. While teaching at these clinics for several summers, Geissman first met (and played with) drummer Peter Erskine and pianist Dan Haerle.

In 1973, Geissman moved to Los Angeles and attended one semester at Cal State Fullerton, where he played in the band led by pianist and clarinetist Tom Ranier. Transferring to Cal State Northridge in 1974 to be closer to the Hollywood studio scene, Geissman joined the Northridge "A" band led by jazz educator Joel Leach. While at Northridge, he began playing in both Gerald Wilson's Big Band and with Louie Bellson's Big Band, recording several albums with Bellson. For Louie Bellson's Live at the Concord Summer Festival, Geissman contributed an original composition, "Starship Concord." He began playing in local jazz venues with Tony Rizzi's guitar band, recording Tony Rizzi's Five Guitars Play Charlie Christian (1976), which featured Tom Ranier and Pete Christlieb.

Geissman's first gig with flugelhornist Chuck Mangione was at the Santa Monica Civic Auditorium on November 9, 1976. A short tour of the Pacific Northwest followed, and soon after Mangione asked Geissman to become a permanent member of the band. Mangione's band consisted of Geissman on guitar, Charles Meeks on bass, Chris Vadala on woodwinds, and James Bradley Jr. on drums. Geissman appeared on the album Feels So Good (1977), which sold two million copies. On radio, the single "Feels So Good", featuring Geissman's guitar solo, was an international hit. A 1980 issue of Current Biography called it the most recognized tune since "Michelle" by The Beatles.

In 1978 Geissman released his first solo album, Good Stuff (Concord Jazz), which featured fellow Northridge alumnus Gordon Goodwin on sax, Tom Ranier on piano, Bob Magnusson on bass guitar, and Steve Shaeffer on drums. Grant left Mangione's band in 1981 to pursue other endeavors, including his own albums, session work, and composing. Two of his albums (Flying Colors and Time Will Tell) reached number one in the Gavin and Radio and Records Contemporary Jazz airplay charts, and many of his recordings reached the top ten.

Geissman has been a regular member of Gordon Goodwin's Big Phat Band. He has appeared as a session musician on albums by Peter Allen, Sheila E., Miki Howard, Quincy Jones, Rodney Friend, Diane Schuur, Van Dyke Parks, and Luis Miguel. He has recorded with Keiko Matsui, 3rd Force, David Benoit, Cheryl Bentyne, and Lorraine Feather and had a guitar solo as a separate track on the album Hold an Old Friend's Hand by Tiffany. He plays guitar in The Tribe, a revolving group of Los Angeles musicians and singers that includes Stephen John Kalinich, Freebo, Fuzzbee Morse, Gary Stockdale, Carly Smithson, Rosemary Butler, Marc Mann, Gary Griffin, The Honeys, and Band Manager Lauri Reimer.

Geissman reunited with Mangione in 2000 when they recorded the album Everything for Love (Chesky). Geissman's early musical influences came full circle in 2003 when he played Dobro on Ringo Starr's Ringorama album. In 2006, he released his thirteenth album as a leader, Say That!, on his own label, Futurism Records. A throwback to the jazz that first influenced him, he has described the sound of this album as "Wes Montgomery meets Horace Silver meets Jimmy Smith." In All About Jazz, John Kelman said,

It's a shame that the words 'smooth jazz' have become an oxymoron. Say That!, with its relaxed pace and easy-on-the-ears approach, is as smooth as it gets. But smooth jazz it ain't. Geissman's clear roots in the jazz mainstream, and a less-is-more style that reveals greater depth, makes Say That! a welcome return to the fold for a guitarist who's always deserved more street cred than he's received.

== Television ==
Geissman and Mangione appeared on many televisions shows, including The Tonight Show, Dinah Shore, Merv Griffin, Phil Donahue, The Midnight Special, Don Kirshner's Rock Concert and Dick Clark's New Year's Rockin' Eve. Geissman's other albums with Mangione include Children of Sanchez (1978), Live at the Hollywood Bowl (1979), and Fun and Games (1980).

Geissman's playing has been heard on numerous television series, including Dawson's Creek, Family Affair, Boy Meets World, Touched by an Angel and Lizzie McGuire. He can be heard playing the Djangoesque acoustic guitar on the theme for the television series Monk, starring Tony Shalhoub. Nominated for a 2001 Emmy for co-writing the song "No Puedo Olvidar" for the daytime drama Passions, he received an Emmy nomination in 2004 for another Passions song, "Momma, Gotta Let Her Go". In 2003, he was nominated for an Annie award for producing Van Dyke Parks' songs for HBO's Harold and the Purple Crayon. He has written additional music for films and television movies, including The Ponder Heart (2001), Call Me Claus (2001), Monday Night Mayhem (2002), Die, Mommie, Die! (2003) and The Mojo Cafe (2004). Dennis C. Brown and Geissman collaborated on the underscore for the hit CBS-TV sitcom Two and a Half Men. The show's theme, co-written by Geissman, was nominated for an Emmy Award in 2004.

== Books ==
Apart from his musical career, Geissman has written books about Mad magazine and EC Comics, including Collectibly Mad (Kitchen Sink Press, 1995); Tales of Terror! The EC Comics Companion, co-authored with Fred von Bernewitz (Fantagraphics, 2000); and Foul Play! The Art and Artists of the Notorious 1950s E.C. Comics! (HarperDesign, 2005). He has also compiled and/or written annotations for ten other Mad-related books, and he appears in Chip Selby's documentary, Tales from the Crypt: From Comic Books to Television (2004). In 2011, Geissman teamed with Russ Cochran to launch a publishing company, GC Press, to continue the hardcover EC Archives series originally published by Gemstone.

== Discography ==
=== As leader ===
- Good Stuff (Concord Jazz, 1978)
- Put Away Childish Toys (Pausa, 1983)
- Drinkin' from the Money River (TBA, 1986)
- Snapshots (TBA, 1987)
- All My Tomorrows (TBA, 1988)
- Take Another Look (Bluemoon, 1990)
- Flying Colors (Bluemoon, 1991)
- Time Will Tell (Bluemoon, 1992)
- Reruns (compilation) (Bluemoon, 1992)
- Rustic Technology (Bluemoon, 1993)
- Business As Usual (Positive Music, 1995)
- In with the Out Crowd (Higher Octave, 1998)
- Say That! (Futurism, 2006)
- Cool Man Cool (Futurism, 2009)
- Bop! Bang! Boom! (Futurism, 2012)
- Blooz (Futurism, 2022)

=== As sideman ===
With Paula Abdul

- Head over Heels (Virgin, 1995)

With Peter Allen

- Making Every Moment Count (RCA, 1990)

With Louie Bellson

- Live at the Concord Summer Festival (Concord Jazz, 1976)
- Sunshine Rock (Pablo, 1978)
- Matterhorn (Pablo, 1979)

With David Benoit

- This Side Up (Spindletop, 1985)
- Every Step of the Way (GRP, 1988)
- Inner Motion (GRP, 1990)

With Cheryl Bentyne

- The Lights Still Burn (Paddle Wheel, 2003)
- Moonlight Serenade (King, 2003)
- Let Me Off Uptown (Telarc, 2005)
- The Book of Love (Telarc, 2006)

With Pat Boone

- Just the Way I Am (Lamb & Lion, 1979)

With Vikki Carr

- Esos Hombres (CBS, 1988)

With Marla Gibbs

- It's Never Too Late! (Forever 30, 2006)

With Josh Groban

- Illuminations (143, 2010)

With Dan Hill

- Real Love (CBS, 1989)

With Julio Iglesias

- Tango (Columbia, 1996)
- Divorcio (Columbia, 2003)

With Chuck Mangione

- Feels So Good (A&M, 1977)
- Children of Sanchez (A&M, 1978)

With Clair Marlo

- Let it Go (Sheffield Lab, 1989)
- Behaviour Self (WildCat!, 1995)

With Liza Minnelli

- Gently (Angel, 1996)

With Van Dyke Parks and Gaby Moreno

- ¡Spangled! (Nonesuch, 2019)

With Diane Schuur

- Pure Schuur (GRP, 1991)

With Ringo Starr

- Ringo Rama (Koch, 2003)

With Kelly Sweet

- We Are One (Razor & Tie, 2007)

With Robbie Williams

- Escapology (Chrysalis, 2002)

With Brian Wilson and Van Dyke Parks

- Orange Crate Art (Warner Bros, 1995)
