= Rainy Day (album) =

Studio album by Kai Winding
- Released: 1965
- Recorded: December 14, 1964 and January 14, February 27 & March 22, 1965; New York City
- Genre: Jazz
- Label: Verve; V/V6 8620
- Producer: Creed Taylor

Kai Winding chronology
Modern Country (1964)	Rainy Day (1965)	The In Instrumentals (1965)

Rainy Day is an album by jazz trombonist and arranger Kai Winding featuring vocal group, The Prevailing Winds, recorded in late 1964 and early 1965 for the Verve label.

== Reception ==
Professional ratings
Review scores
Source	Rating
Allmusic	3/5 stars

The Allmusic review by Tony Wilds said "Whether Rainy Day is best saved for one remains in doubt, but at least the concept balances the many mod albums selling nothing but "Madison Avenue"'s sweetness-and-light".

== Track listing ==
1. "Half a Crown" (Bobby Scott, Joseph Scott) - 2:19
2. "We Fell in Love in the Rain" (Kai Winding) - 2:30
3. "April Showers" (Louis Silvers, B. G. De Sylva) - 2:33
4. "Leave Me Alone" (Winding, Jerry Keller) - 2:34
5. "Love Theme from the Motion Picture "Umbrellas of Cherbourg" (I Will Wait for You)" (Michel Legrand, Norman Gimbel) - 2:00
6. "Here's That Rainy Day" (Jimmy Van Heusen, Johnny Burke) - 2:25
7. "Singin' in the Rain" (Arthur Freed, Nacio Herb Brown) - 1:50
8. "Over the Rainbow" (Harold Arlen, Yip Harburg) - 2:00
9. "Pennies from Heaven" (Arthur Johnston, Burke) - 4:15
10. "Puddles" (Winding) - 2:10
11. "Dinner For One Please, James" (Michael Carr) - 3:02
12. "Watermelon Man" (Herbie Hancock) - 2:53

== Personnel ==
- Kai Winding - trombone, arranger
- Tony Studd, Bill Watrous - trombone
- Roger Kellaway - piano, organ
- Arthur Butler - organ
- Paul Griffin, Ross Tompkins - piano
- Everett Barksdale, Kenny Burrell, Billy Mure, Bucky Pizzarelli - guitar
- Russell George - bass, guitar
- Bob Bushnell - electric bass
- Sol Gubin, Al Harewood, Grady Tate - drums
- The Prevailing Winds - vocal group directed by Jerry Keller (tracks 1, 2, 4 & 6–8)
