= Mondo Cane No. 2 =

Mondo Cane #2

Studio album by Kai Winding
- Released: 1964
- Recorded: October 16, 1963 and January 23 & 31, 1964; New York City
- Genre: Jazz
- Label: Verve; V/V6 8573
- Producer: Creed Taylor

Kai Winding chronology
Kai Winding (1963)	Mondo Cane #2 (1964)	Modern Country (1964)

Mondo Cane #2 is an album by jazz trombonist and arranger Kai Winding featuring guitarist Les Spann recorded in late 1963 and early 1964 for the Verve label. The album was released following the chart success of Winding's version of the "More (Theme from Mondo Cane)" from the album Soul Surfin' (reissued as !!!More!!! (Theme from Mondo Cane)).

== Reception ==
Professional ratings
Review scores
Source	Rating
Allmusic	4/5 stars

The Allmusic review by Tony Wilds observed "Mondo Cane, No. 2 complements its best-selling predecessor by shifting from surf to soil. The Ondioline takes center stage driving the melody... Is the sequel better than the original? Yes, if you prefer originality in composition and arrangement as well as plenty of Ondioline. No, if you want surf, standards, and Kenny Burrell".

== Track listing ==
1. "Mondo Cane #2" (Nino Oliviero) - 1:52
2. "Simian Theme" (Kai Winding) - 1:48
3. "Till (Triere Sans Espoir)" (Charles Danvers, Carl Sigman) - 2:05
4. "Python" (Claus Ogerman) - 1:58
5. "The Moldau" (Bedřich Smetana) - 2:19
6. "Now and Forever" (Al Kasha, Bob Gaudio) - 2:21
7. "Portrait of My Love" (David West, Cyril Ornadel) - 1:57
8. "Warm" (Sid Jacobson, Jimmy Krondes) - 2:03
9. "The Gospel Truth" (Kasha, Gaudio) - 2:20
10. "Theme from "Nowhere"" (Winding) - 1:55
11. "Theme from "The Medic" (Blue Star)" (Victor Young, Edward Heyman) - 2:13
12. "The Struggle" (Ogerman) - 2:03

== Personnel ==
- Kai Winding - trombone, arranger
- Les Spann - guitar
- Jean Jacques Perrey - ondioline
- Unidentified band
- Billy Byers (track 8), Charles Calello (tracks 5 & 6), Claus Ogerman (tracks 1, 4, 7, 9 & 12) - arranger
