= More Brass =

Studio album by Kai Winding
- Released: 1966
- Recorded: March 23, 25 & 30, 1966
- Studio: Van Gelder Studio, Englewood Cliffs, NJ
- Genre: Jazz
- Length: 31:47
- Label: Verve; V/V6 8657
- Producer: Creed Taylor

Kai Winding chronology
The In Instrumentals (1965)	More Brass (1966)	Dirty Dog (1966)

More Brass is an album by jazz trombonist and arranger Kai Winding recorded in 1966 for the Verve label.

== Reception ==
Professional ratings
Review scores
Source	Rating
Allmusic	3/5 stars

The Allmusic site gave the album 3 stars.

== Track listing ==
1. "September Song" (Kurt Weill, Maxwell Anderson) - 3:10
2. "Walk On the Wild Side" (Elmer Bernstein, Mack David) - 3:10
3. "Laura" (David Raksin, Johnny Mercer) - 2:45
4. "It's All Right With Me" (Cole Porter) - 2:10
5. "Strange" (Marvin Fisher, John LaTouche) - 2:10
6. "More (Theme from Mondo Cane)" (Nino Oliviero, Riz Ortolani) - 2:00
7. "Stardust" (Hoagy Carmichael, Mitchell Parish) - 3:30
8. "Stella by Starlight" (Victor Young, Ned Washington) - 3:37
9. "I'm Getting Sentimental Over You" (George Bassman, Washington) - 4:10
10. "Harper" (Johnny Mandel) - 2:15
11. "Invitation" (Bronisław Kaper, Paul Francis Webster) - 2:50

== Personnel ==
- Kai Winding - trombone, arranger
- Wayne Andre, Carl Fontana, Urbie Green, John Messner, Bill Tole, Bill Watrous - trombone
- Dick Lieb, Tony Studd - bass trombone
- Paul Griffin, Hank Jones - piano, harpsichord
- Kenny Burrell - guitar
- Richard Davis - double bass
- Grady Tate - drums
- Bobby Rosengarden - timpani, bongos, percussion
- Wayne Andre, (tracks 3 & 9), Dick Lieb (tracks 5, 7 & 8), Oliver Nelson (tracks 1 & 2), Claus Ogerman (tracks 6 & 10), Bobby Scott (track 11)
