= Wayne Andre =

American jazz trombonist (1931–2003)

Wayne Andre (November 17, 1931 – August 26, 2003) was an American jazz trombonist, best known for his work as a session musician.

== Early life ==
Wayne Andre was born November 17, 1931 in Manchester, Connecticut. Andre's father was a saxophonist, and he took private music lessons from age 15.

== Career ==
He played with Charlie Spivak in the early 1950s before spending some time in the U.S. Air Force. In 1955 he joined the Sauter-Finegan Orchestra, and in 1956 played with Woody Herman. From 1956 to 1958 he played with Kai Winding and attended the Manhattan School of Music. He composed his "Nutcracker" and arranged "The Preacher" for the Kai Winding septet while performing with the septet. In the 1960s, he performed with Gerry Mulligan's first Concert Jazz Band, the Thad Jones/Mel Lewis orchestra, and Clark Terry's big band. He joined the "Mission to Russia" with Benny Goodman in 1962. He also played with Urbie Green, Art Farmer, Roy Ayres, and Carl Fontana.

After settling in New York City, Andre became a sought-after studio sideman and soloist. His solos may be heard on such albums as Liza Minnelli's "More Than You Know" on Liza with a Z, Bruce Springsteen's Born to Run and "Blue Turk" on Alice Cooper's School's Out album. The New York Chapter of the National Academy of Recording Arts and Sciences presented Andre with the Most Valuable Player Award in 1982 and 1986. During this time he also played with Lynn Welshman's Tentet, The Mingus Big Band and The Epitaph Band, Jaco Pastorius' "Word of Mouth" band and many others. He also performed with his own quintet, which included musicians Marvin Stamm, Pat Rebillot, Ronnie Zito, Jay Leonhart; and his septet, which included Matt Finders, Keith O'Quinn, and Jim Pugh. Later, Andre enjoyed performing with his own big band, the Illinois Jacquet Band and Mike Longo's New York State of the Art Jazz Ensemble.

Wayne Andre also continued to write music throughout his life. His composition "Ayo" was recorded by Bill Watrous with The Manhattan Wildlife Refuge Band. He premiered his composition for trombone and symphony orchestra, "The Rise and Fall of Love," with the Oslo Big Band Orchestra in Norway.

== Discography ==
=== As sideman ===
With George Benson

- Shape of Things to Come (A&M/CTI, 1968)
- The Other Side of Abbey Road (A&M, 1970)
- White Rabbit (CTI, 1972)
- Bad Benson (CTI, 1974)

With Eumir Deodato

- Deodato 2 (CTI, 1973)
- Prelude (CTI, 1973)
- Very Together (MCA, 1976)
- Love Island (Warner Bros., 1978)

With Maynard Ferguson

- The Blues Roar (Mainstream, 1964)
- Color Me Wild (Mainstream, 1974)
- Conquistador (Columbia, 1977)

With Gloria Gaynor

- Experience (MGM, 1975)
- I've Got You (Polydor, 1976)
- Glorious (Polydor, 1977)

With Astrud Gilberto

- Beach Samba (Verve, 1967)
- I Haven't Got Anything Better to Do (Verve, 1969)
- That Girl from Ipanema (Image, 1977)

With Benny Goodman

- Benny Goodman in Moscow (RCA Victor, 1962)
- This Is Benny Goodman Vol. 2 (RCA Victor, 1972)
- Live at Carnegie Hall 40th Anniversary Concert (London, 1978)
- The King (Century, 1978)

With Urbie Green

- Twenty-One Trombones (Project 3, 1967)
- 21 Trombones Rock/Blues/Jazz Volume Two (Project 3, 1969)
- Urbie Green's Big Beautiful Band (Project 3, 1974)

With Johnny Hammond

- The Prophet (Kudu, 1972)
- Wild Horses Rock Steady (Kudu, 1972)
- Higher Ground (Kudu, 1974)

With Freddie Hubbard

- Sky Dive (CTI, 1972)
- Polar (CTI, 1975)
- Windjammer (Columbia, 1976)

With Bob James

- One (CTI, 1974)
- Two (CTI, 1975)
- Three (CTI, 1976)
- Heads (Tappan Zee, 1977)
- Touchdown (Tappan Zee, 1978)
- Lucky Seven (Tappan Zee, 1979)
- Hands Down (Tappan Zee, 1982)

With Quincy Jones

- I Dig Dancers (Mercury, 1960)
- Gula Matari (A&M, 1970)
- Smackwater Jack (A&M, 1971)
- I Heard That!! (A&M, 1976)

With Wes Montgomery

- California Dreaming (Verve, 1966)
- Goin' Out of My Head (Verve, 1966)
- Road Song (A&M/CTI, 1968)

With The Manhattan Transfer

- Jukin' (Capitol, 1975)
- The Manhattan Transfer (Atlantic, 1975)
- Pastiche (Atlantic, 1978)

With Jimmy Owens

- Headin' Home (A&M/Horizon, 1978)

With Jaco Pastorius

- Invitation (Warner Bros., 1983)
- Twins I Aurex Jazz Festival '82 (Warner Bros., 1982)
- Twins II Aurex Jazz Festival '82 (Warner Bros., 1982)
- Truth, Liberty & Soul (Resonance, 2017)

With Grover Washington Jr.

- Inner City Blues (Kudu, 1971)
- All The King's Horses (Kudu, 1972)
- Mister Magic (Kudu, 1975)
- Soul Box (Kudu, 1973)

With Kai Winding

- Jay and Kai (Columbia, 1956)
- The Trombone Sound (Columbia, 1956)
- Trombone Panorama (Columbia, 1957)
- The In Instrumentals (Verve, 1965)
- More Brass (Verve, 1966)

With others

- Manny Albam, Brass on Fire (Solid State, 1966)
- Alessi Brothers, All for a Reason (A&M, 1977)
- Peter Allen, Continental American (A&M, 1974)
- Patti Austin, Havana Candy (CTI, 1977)
- Roy Ayers, Coffy (Polydor, 1973)
- Gato Barbieri, Caliente! (A&M, 1976)
- Gato Barbieri, Ruby, Ruby (A&M, 1977)
- Tony Bennett, My Heart Sings (Columbia, 1961)
- Bob Brookmeyer, Gloomy Sunday and Other Bright Moments (Verve, 1961)
- Kenny Burrell, Blues - The Common Ground (Verve, 1968)
- Kenny Burrell, Night Song (Verve, 1969)
- Felix Cavaliere, Destiny (Bearsville, 1975)
- Billy Cobham, Simplicity of Expression Depth of Thought (Columbia, 1978)
- Cy Coleman, The Party's On Me (RCA Victor, 1976)
- Judy Collins, Judith (Elektra, 1975)
- Judy Collins, Times of Our Lives (Elektra, 1982)
- Chris Connor, Sings Ballads of the Sad Cafe (Atlantic, 1959)
- Alice Cooper, School's Out (Warner, 1972)
- Chick Corea, The Leprechaun (Polydor, 1976)
- Hank Crawford, Help Me Make it Through the Night (Kudu, 1972)
- Hank Crawford, Wildflower (Kudu, 1973)
- Paul Desmond, Summertime (A&M, 1969)
- Charles Earland, The Dynamite Brothers (Prestige, 1973)
- Art Farmer, Brass Shout (United Artists, 1959)
- Dean Friedman, Dean Friedman (Lifesong, 1977)
- Curtis Fuller, Cabin in the Sky (Impulse!, 1962)
- Eric Gale, Ginseng Woman (Columbia, 1977)
- Eric Gale, Multiplication (Columbia, 1977)
- Erroll Garner, Up in Erroll's Room (MPS, 1968)
- Mike Gibbs & Gary Burton, In the Public Interest (Polydor, 1974)
- Dizzy Gillespie, Cornucopia (Solid State, 1970)
- Dexter Gordon, Sophisticated Giant (Columbia, 1977)
- Buddy Greco, I Like It Swinging (Columbia, 1961)
- Donny Hathaway, Extension of a Man (ATCO, 1973)
- Heath Brothers, Passing Thru (Columbia, 1978)
- Heath Brothers, In Motion (Columbia, 1979)
- Woody Herman, Blues Groove (Capitol, 1956)
- Terumasa Hino, City Connection (Flying Disk, 1979)
- Rupert Holmes, Partners in Crime (Infinity, 1979)
- Lena Horne, Lena Horne: The Lady and Her Music (Qwest, 1981)
- Janis Ian, Aftertones (Columbia, 1975)
- Janis Ian, Janis Ian (CBS, 1978)
- Weldon Irvine, Sinbad (RCA Victor, 1976)
- Jackie & Roy, Time & Love (CTI, 1972)
- J. J. Johnson, Broadway Express (RCA Victor, 1965)
- Yusef Lateef, Part of the Search (Atlantic, 1973)
- Yusef Lateef, 10 Years Hence (Atlantic, 1975)
- Hubert Laws, Romeo & Juliet (Columbia, 1976)
- Hubert Laws, Say It with Silence (Columbia, 1978)
- Michel Legrand, Plays Richard Rodgers (Philips, 1963)
- O'Donel Levy, Dawn of a New Day (Groove Merchant, 1973)
- Jon Lucien, Premonition (Columbia, 1976)
- Chuck Mangione, Main Squeeze (A&M, 1976)
- Gap Mangione, Diana in the Autumn Wind (GRC, 1968)
- Gap Mangione, Sing Along Junk (Mercury, 1972)
- Arif Mardin, Glass Onion (Atlantic, 1969)
- Charlie Mariano, A Jazz Portrait of Charlie Mariano (Regina, 1963)
- Marilyn McCoo & Billy Davis Jr., Marilyn & Billy (Columbia, 1978)
- Van McCoy, The Disco Kid (Avco, 1975)
- Van McCoy, My Favorite (Fantasy, 1978)
- Jimmy McGriff, The Big Band (Solid State, 1966)
- Glenn Miller, In the Digital Mood (GRP, 1983)
- Liza Minnelli, Live at the Winter Garden (CBS, 1974)
- Blue Mitchell, Funktion Junction (RCA, 1976)
- Melba Moore, Melba (Buddah, 1976)
- Airto Moreira, Free (CTI, 1972)
- Tony Mottola, Tony Mottola and the Brass Menagerie (Project 3, 1974)
- Gerry Mulligan, The Concert Jazz Band (Verve, 1960)
- Walter Murphy, Rhapsody in Blue (Private Stock, 1977)
- Stephanie Nakasian, Comin' Alive (V.S.O.P. )
- Milton Nascimento, Courage (A&M/CTI, 1969)
- Goro Noguchi, Goro in New York (Polydor, 1977)
- Jimmy Owens, Headin' Home Horizon (A&M, 1978)
- Hermeto Pascoal, Hermeto (Cobblestone, 1970)
- Oscar Peterson, With Respect to Nat (Limelight, 1965)
- Players Association, Born to Dance (Vanguard, 1977)
- Ray, Goodman & Brown, Stay (Polydor, 1981)
- Buddy Rich, Speak No Evil (RCA Victor, 1976)
- Buddy Rich, The Exciting Buddy Rich (RCA 1979)
- Johnny Richards, Aqui Se Habla Espanol (Roulette, 1967)
- Vicki Sue Robinson, Never Gonna Let You Go (RCA Victor, 1976)
- David Ruffin, In My Stride (Motown, 1977)
- Joe Scott, A Symphony of Our Time (Mainstream, 1970)
- Joe Scott, The NOW Generation (Mainstream, 1970)
- Lalo Schifrin, Black Widow (CTI, 1976)
- Doc Severinsen, Fever! (Command, 1966)
- Don Sebesky, Giant Box (CTI, 1973)
- Don Sebesky, The Rape of El Morro (CTI, 1975)
- Marlena Shaw, Take a Bite (Columbia, 1979)
- David Spinozza, Spinozza (A&M, 1978)
- Bruce Springsteen, Born to Run (Columbia, 1975)
- Steely Dan, Gaucho (MCA, 1980)
- Gabor Szabo, Mizrab (CTI, 1973)
- Billy Taylor, Right Here, Right Now! (Capitol, 1963)
- Tina Turner, Love Explosion (United Artists, 1979)
- Stanley Turrentine, The Man with the Sad Face (Fantasy, 1976)
- Frankie Valli, Closeup (Private Stock, 1975)
- Sarah Vaughan, Viva! (Mercury, 1964)
- Martha Velez, American Heartbeat (Sire, 1977)
- Harold Vick, After the Dance (Wolf, 1977)
- Cedar Walton, Mobius (RCA 1975)
- Cedar Walton, Beyond Mobius (RCA Victor, 1976)
- Bill Watrous, Manhattan Wildlife Refuge (Columbia, 1974)
- Randy Weston, Blue Moses (CTI, 1972)
- Zulema, R.S.V.P. (RCA Victor, 1975)
- Zulema, Z-licious (London, 1978)
