= Frank Rehak =

American jazz trombonist (1926–1987)

- Born: 6 July 1926; New York City
- Died: 22 June 1987 (aged 60) Badger
- Genres: Jazz
- Instruments: Trombone, piano, cello

Frank Rehak (July 6, 1926, in New York City, New York – June 22, 1987, in Badger, California) was an American jazz trombonist. He began on piano and cello before switching to trombone. He worked with Gil Evans and Miles Davis. He also appeared with Davis on the broadcast "The Sounds of Miles Davis."

He had a failed marriage to nightclub dancer Jerri Gray. He also had a heroin addiction, which combined with other financial problems led to his withdrawal from music and lapsing into relative obscurity. In an effort to deal with these issues he spent time at Synanon, which led to his mention in Art Pepper's autobiography. He died in Badger of throat cancer at the age of 60.

== Discography ==
=== As leader ===
- Frank Rehak Sextet/Alex Smith Quintet, Jazzville Vol. 2 (Dawn, 1957)

=== As sideman ===
With Tony Bennett

- My Heart Sings (Columbia, 1961)
- Tony Bennett at Carnegie Hall (Columbia, 1962)

With Al Cohn

- Mr. Music (RCA Victor, 1955)
- The Natural Seven (RCA Victor, 1955)
- Cohn on the Saxophone (Dawn, 1956)
- Son of Drum Suite (RCA Victor, 1961)

With Miles Davis

- Miles Ahead (Columbia, 1957)
- Porgy and Bess (Columbia, 1959)
- Sketches of Spain (Columbia, 1960)
- Facets (CBS, 1967) – track A1, A2 (1962)
- Sorcerer (CBS, 1967) – track B3 (1962)
- Facets Vol. 1 (CBS/Sony, 1970) – track B1, B2 (1962)
- Directions (Columbia, 1981) – track A1 (1960)
- Blue Christmas (CBS, 1983)

With Dizzy Gillespie

- World Statesman (Norgran, 1956)
- Dizzy in Greece (Verve, 1957)
- Gillespiana (Verve, 1960)

With Woody Herman

- Herman's Heat & Puente's Beat! (Everest, 1958) – with Tito Puente
- The Herd Rides Again (Everest, 1958)
- The Fourth Herd (Jazzland, 1960)
- Hey! Heard the Herd? (Verve, 1963)
- Woody Herman & the Fourth Herd (Windmill, 1972)
- The Third Herd Vol. 1 (Discovery, 1981)
- The Third Herd Vol. 2 (Discovery, 1982)
- Woody Herman and His Orchestra (Joker, 1983)

With Quincy Jones

- This Is How I Feel About Jazz (ABC-Paramount, 1957) – track A1, A2 (1956)
- The Great Wide World of Quincy Jones (Mercury, 1959)
- The Quintessential Charts (Impulse! ABC, 1978) – track B1, B2 (1956)

With Gene Krupa

- Burnin' Beat (Verve, 1962) – with Buddy Rich
- Drummin' Man (Columbia, 1963)
- 1949 (Alamac, 1974)
- The Drums (Verve, 1987)
- Gene Krupa & Buddy Rich (Verve, 1988) – with Buddy Rich

With Hugo Montenegro

- Bongos and Brass (Time, 1960)
- Cha Chas for Dancing (Time, 1960)
- Great Songs from Motion Pictures Vol. 1 (1927–1937) (Time, 1961)
- Great Songs from Motion Pictures Vol. 2 (1938–1944) (Time, 1961)
- Great Songs from Motion Pictures Vol. 3 (1945–1960) (Time, 1961)
- The Great Hits of the 50's (Time, 1964)
- Montenegro & Mayhem (Time, 1965)

With others

- Cat Anderson, Cat On a Hot Tin Horn (Mercury, 1958)
- Ernestine Anderson, My Kinda Swing (Mercury, 1960)
- Buddy Arnold, Wailing (ABC-Paramount, 1956)
- Charlie Barnet, More Charlie Barnet (Everest, 1959)
- Big Maybelle, Blues, Candy & Big Maybelle (Savoy, 1986)
- Art Blakey, Art Blakey Big Band (Bethlehem, 1957)
- Art Blakey, Ain't Life Grand (Bethlehem, 1959)
- Bob Brookmeyer, Jazz Concerto Grosso (ABC-Paramount, 1957)
- Bob Brookmeyer, Portrait of the Artist (Atlantic, 1960)
- Ruth Brown, Late Date with Ruth Brown (Atlantic, 1959)
- Bobby Byrne, The Jazzbone's Connected to the Trombone (Grand Award, 1959)
- Cándido Camero, The Volcanic (ABC-Paramount, 1957)
- Al "Jazzbo" Collins, Presents Swinging at the Opera (Everest, 1960)
- Chris Connor, Sings Ballads of the Sad Cafe (Atlantic, 1959)
- Chris Connor, Witchcraft (Atlantic, 1959)
- Don Costa, Echoing Voices and Trombones (United Artists, 1960)
- Jimmy Dorsey, Vol. 3 1949–1951 (Hindsight, 1981)
- Jimmy Dorsey, The Uncollected Jimmy Dorsey and His Orchestra Vol. 4 1950 (Hindsight, 1982)
- Gil Evans, New Bottle Old Wine (World Pacific, 1958)
- Gil Evans, The Individualism of Gil Evans (Verve, 1964)
- Art Farmer, The Aztec Suite (United Artists, 1959)
- Barry Galbraith, Guitar and the Wind (Decca, 1958)
- Marty Gold, Swingin' West (RCA Victor, 1960)
- Buddy Greco, I Like It Swinging (Columbia, 1961)
- Urbie Green, The Persuasive Trombone of Urbie Green Volume 2 (Command, 1962)
- George Handy, By George! (Handy, of Course) (X 1956)
- Johnny Hartman, All of Me (Bethlehem, 1978)
- Johnny Hartman, Songs from the Heart (Bethlehem, 1984)
- Andre Hodeir, American Jazzmen Play Andre Hodeir's Essais (Savoy, 1957)
- Kenyon Hopkins/Creed Taylor, The Sound of New York (ABC-Paramount, 1959)
- Kenyon Hopkins, The Hustler (Kapp, 1961)
- Michel Legrand, Legrand Jazz (Columbia, 1958)
- Michel Legrand, Michel Legrand Meets Miles Davis (Philips, 1970)
- Leiber-Stoller Big Band, Yakety Yak (Atlantic, 1960)
- Melba Liston, Melba Liston and Her 'Bones (MetroJazz, 1959)
- Mundell Lowe, Themes from Mr. Lucky, the Untouchables and Other TV Action Jazz (RCA Camden, 1960)
- Teo Macero, Teo (American Clave, 1980)
- Carmen McRae, Something to Swing About (Kapp, 1959)
- Red Mitchell, Whitey Mitchell, Blue Mitchell and André Previn, Get Those Elephants Out'a Here (MetroJazz, 1958)
- Sam Most, Plays Bird Bud Monk and Miles (Bethlehem, 1957)
- Gerry Mulligan/Bob Brookmeyer, Gerry Mulligan Bob Brookmeyer Play Phil Sunkel's Jazz Concerto Grosso (ABC-Paramount, 1958)
- Joe Newman, All I Wanna Do Is Swing (RCA Victor, 1955)
- Joe Newman, The Happy Cats (Coral, 1957)
- Claus Ogerman, Sounds for Sick? People (Shell, 1960)
- Nat Pierce, Big Band at the Savoy (RCA Victor, 1962)
- Bill Potts, The Jazz Soul of Porgy & Bess Conducted, Orchestrated and Arranged by Bill Potts (United Artists, 1959)
- Andre Previn, The Previn Scene (MGM, 1961)
- Gene Quill, 3 Bones and a Quill (Vogue, 1959)
- Johnny Richards, Wide Range (Capitol, 1957)
- Sonny Rollins, Sonny Rollins and the Big Brass (MetroJazz, 1958)
- Pete Rugolo, Rugolomania (Columbia, 1955)
- Pete Rugolo, New Sounds by Pete Rugolo (Harmony, 1957)
- Jimmy Rushing, Little Jimmy Rushing and the Big Brass (Columbia, 1958)
- Jimmy Rushing, Mr. Five by Five (Columbia, 1980)
- George Russell, New York, N.Y. (Decca, 1959)
- George Russell, Jazz in the Space Age (Decca, 1960)
- Aaron Sachs, Clarinet and Co. (Fresh Sound, 1957)
- A. K. Salim, Flute Suite (Savoy, 1957)
- Sal Salvador, Colors in Sound (Decca, 1958)
- Hal Schaefer, U A Showcase: Great Songs from United Artists Pictures (London, 1958)
- Lalo Schifrin and Bob Brookmeyer, Samba Para Dos (Verve, 1963)
- Doc Severinsen, Tempestuous Trumpet (Command, 1961)
- Doc Severinsen, The Big Band's Back In Town (Command, 1962)
- George Siravo, Rodgers & Hart Percussion & Strings (Time, 1960)
- Idrees Sulieman,Roots (New Jazz, 1957)
- Creed Taylor, Lonelyville The Nervous Beat (ABC-Paramount, 1959)
- Sonny Truitt, Drummer Delights (Music Minus One, 1961)
- Frank Wess, Bobby Jaspar Seldon Powell, The Spirit of Charlie Parker (World Wide, 1958)
- Randy Weston, Destry Rides Again (United Artists, 1959)
- George Williams, Swing Classics in Hi-Fi (United Artists, 1959)
- George Williams, Put On Your Dancing Shoes (United Artists, 1960)
- Kai Winding, The Swingin' States (Columbia, 1958)
- Kai Winding, Dance to the City Beat (Columbia, 1959)
