= Ross Tompkins =

American jazz pianist (1938–2006)

- Born: May 13, 1938; Detroit, Michigan, U.S.
- Died: June 30, 2006 (aged 68) St. Augustine, Florida, U.S.
- Genres: Jazz, big band
- Occupation: Musician
- Instrument: Piano
- Years active: 1960–2002
- Labels: Concord Jazz, Progressive, Arbors

Ross Tompkins (May 13, 1938 – June 30, 2006) was an American jazz pianist who was a member of The Tonight Show Band.

== Biography ==
Tompkins attended the New England Conservatory of Music, then moved to New York City, where he worked with Kai Winding (1960–67), Eric Dolphy (1964), Wes Montgomery (1966), Bob Brookmeyer/Clark Terry (1966), Benny Goodman (1968), Bobby Hackett (1965–70), and Al Cohn and Zoot Sims (1968–72). He moved to Los Angeles in 1971, playing with Louie Bellson, Joe Venuti, and Red Norvo in the 1970s and Jack Sheldon in the 1980s.

He was best known for his longtime association with The Tonight Show Band, led by Doc Severinsen, on the television program The Tonight Show Starring Johnny Carson. He was a member of the band from 1971 until Carson's retirement in 1992. He recorded for Concord Jazz as a leader in the second half of the 1970s.

Tompkins died of lung cancer at the age of 68.

== Discography ==
=== As leader ===
- A Pair to Draw To (Concord Jazz, 1975)
- Scrimshaw (Concord, 1976)
- Live at Concord 1977 (Concord, 1977)
- Lost in the Stars (Concord, 1977)
- Ross Tompkins and Good Friends (Concord, 1978)
- Festival Time (Concord, 1979)
- Street of Dreams (Famous Door, 1982)
- Solo Piano (Progressive, 1994)
- Celebrates the Music of Jule Styne (Progressive, 1996)
- Heart to Heart (HD, 1998) with Cathy Segal-Garcia
- Ross Tompkins Celebrates the Music of Harold Arlen (Progressive, 1999)
- Younger than Springtime (Arbors, 2001)

=== As sideman ===
With Kai Winding

- The Great Kai & J. J. (1960)
- The Incredible Kai Winding Trombones (Impulse!, 1960)
- Kai Olé (Verve, 1961)
- Solo (Verve, 1963)
- Israel (A&M/CTI, 1968) with J. J. Johnson
- Stonebone (A&M/CTI (Japan), 1969) with J. J. Johnson

With Doc Severinsen

- 1970 Doc Severinsen's Closet
- 1986 The Tonight Show Band Vol. 1
- 1988 The Tonight Show Band Vol. 2
- 1991 Merry Christmas from Doc Severinsen
- 1991 Once More...With Feeling!
- 1992 Good Medicine
- 1999 Swingin' the Blues

With Tommy Newsom

- 1991 Tommy Newsom and His TV Jazz Stars
- 1996 I Remember You Johnny

With Louie Bellson

- 1974 150 MPH
- 1975 The Louis Bellson Explosion
- 1976 Louie Bellson's 7
- 1978 Louis Bellson Jam
- 1978 Matterhorn
- 1978 Prime Time
- 1978 Raincheck
- 1978 Sunshine Rock
- 1995 Live at Concord Summer Festival
- 1994 Cool Cool Blue

With Herb Ellis

- 1975 A Pair to Draw To
- 1975 Rhythm Willie
- 1979 Soft & Mellow
- 1979 Herb Ellis at Montreux

With Snooky Young

- Snooky & Marshall's Album (1978)
- Horn of Plenty (Concord Jazz, 1979) with John Collins, Ray Brown, and Jake Hanna.

With Bill Watrous

- 1980 I'll Play for You
- 2001 Bill Watrous & Carl Fontana

With Jack Sheldon

- 1983 Stand by for Jack Sheldon
- 1991 On My Own

With others

- 1962 In a Mellow Mood, Joe Newman
- 1968 Warm Wild & Wonderful, Tony Mottola
- 1976 Hawthorne Nights, Zoot Sims
- 1977 The Real Howard Roberts, Howard Roberts
- 1978 Sweet Lorraine, Lorraine Feather
- 1979 Peanuts Hucko with His Pied Piper Quintet, Peanuts Hucko
- 1979 Red and Ross, Red Norvo
- 1980 Play the Music of Michel LeGrand, Bob Cooper
- 1981 California Doings, Dick Cary
- 1988 Just a Bit o' Blues Vol. 1, Spike Robinson
- 1988 Just a Bit o' Blues Vol. 2, Harry Edison/Spike Robinson
- 1990 Doug MacDonald Quartet, Doug MacDonald
- 1990 Piano & Vocals, Jack Lemmon
- 1993 Bob Cooper/Conte Candoli Quintet, Bob Cooper & Conte Candoli
- 1994 Don't You Know I Care?, Polly Podewell
- 1994 Prez Impressions, Dick Hafer
- 1999 Evening Delight, Plas Johnson
- 2001 Live in Paradise, Dave Pell
