= The Swingin' States =

Studio album by The Kai Winding Orchestra
- Released: 1958
- Recorded: August 22, 26 & 29, 1958; New York City
- Genre: Jazz
- Label: Columbia; CL 1264 / CS 8062

Kai Winding chronology
The Axidentals with the Kai Winding Trombones (1958)	The Swingin' States (1958)	Dance to the City Beat (1959)

The Swingin' States is an album by American jazz trombonist Kai Winding featuring performances recorded in 1958 for the Columbia label.

== Reception ==
Professional ratings
Review scores
Source	Rating
Allmusic	3/5 stars

The Allmusic awarded the album 3 stars and stated "The gimmick of this out-of-print LP by trombonist Kai Winding is that all dozen songs have a state in their title... Winding and fellow trombonist Frank Rehak along with pianist Hank Jones split up all of the solo space on the spirited if somewhat lightweight music".

== Track listing ==
1. "Indiana (Back Home Again in Indiana)" (Ballard Macdonald, James F. Hanley) - 2:24
2. "Carry Me Back to Old Virginny" (James A. Bland) - 3:01
3. "California, Here I Come" (Al Jolson, Buddy De Sylva, Joseph Meyer) - 2:46
4. "Louisiana" (Andy Razaf, Bob Schafer, J. C. Johnson) - 2:37
5. "Moonlight in Vermont" (Karl Suessdorf, John Blackburn) - 2:42
6. "Georgia on My Mind" (Hoagy Carmichael, Stuart Gorrell) - 2:58
7. "Jersey Bounce" (Tiny Bradshaw, Eddie Johnson, Bobby Plater, Buddy Feyne) - 2:29
8. "Stars Fell on Alabama" (Frank Perkins, Mitchell Parish) - 2:30
9. "Idaho" (Jesse Stone) - 3:37
10. "At Last Alaska" (Kai Winding) - 3:29
11. "Mississippi Mud" (Harry Barris, James Cavanaugh) - 3:21
12. "Oklahoma!" (Richard Rodgers, Oscar Hammerstein II) - 2:41
- Recorded in New York City on August 22, 1958 (tracks 2, 4, 6 & 7), August 26, 1958 (tracks 1, 3, 5 & 11) and August 29, 1958 (tracks 8–10 & 12).

== Personnel ==
- Kai Winding – trombone, arranger
- Frank Rehak – trombone
- Dick Hixon, Dick Leib (tracks 1, 3, 5 & 11), Tommy Mitchell (tracks 2, 4, 6–10 & 12) - bass trombone
- Hank Jones – piano
- Eddie de Haas – bass
- Gus Johnson – drums
- George Laguna – congas, bongos
