= Modern Country (album) =

Studio album by Kai Winding
- Released: 1964
- Recorded: August 5 & 6, 1964
- Studio: Columbia (Nashville, Tennessee)
- Genre: Jazz
- Label: Verve; V/V6 8602
- Producer: Creed Taylor

Kai Winding chronology
Mondo Cane #2 (1964)	Modern Country (1964)	Rainy Day (1965)

Modern Country is an album by jazz trombonist and arranger Kai Winding featuring jazz adaptations of country music songs recorded with members of The Nashville A-Team in 1964 for the Verve label.

== Reception ==
Professional ratings
Review scores
Source	Rating
Allmusic	3/5 stars

The Allmusic site awarded the album four stars out of a possible five.

== Track listing ==
1. "I Really Don't Want to Know" (Don Robertson, Howard Barnes) - 3:05
2. "Busted" (Harlan Howard) - 3:15
3. "Wolverton Mountain" (Merle Kilgore, Claude King) - 2:19
4. "Bye Bye, Love" (Felice Bryant, Bouleux Bryant) - 2:19
5. "Cool Water" (Bob Nolan) - 2:52
6. "Wildwood Flower" (Cecil Null) - 2:04
7. "Detroit City" (Danny Dill, Mel Tillis) - 2:20
8. "I Walk the Line" (Johnny Cash) - 2:04
9. "Oh Lonesome Me" (Don Gibson) - 2:02
10. "Slippin' Around" (Floyd Tillman) - 2:46
11. "Gotta Travel On" (David Lazar, Larry Ehrlich, Paul Clayton, Tom Six) - 2:10
12. "Dang Me" (Roger Miller) - 1:57
- Recorded in Nashville, TN on August 5, 1964 (tracks 1–4) and August 6, 1964 (tracks 5–12)

== Personnel ==
- Kai Winding - trombone, arranger, conductor
- Gene Mullins, Bill Watrous - trombone
- Harold Bradley, Ray Edenton, Grady Martin, Wayne Moss - guitar
- Joe Zinkan - bass
- Murrey Harman, Doug Kirkham - drums
- The Anita Kerr Singers - vocal group (tracks 1, 4, 5 & 7–11)
- Orchestra conducted by Grady Martin
- Bill McElhiney - arranger, conductor
