= Stonebone =

Studio album by Kai Winding and J. J. Johnson
- Released: 1970
- Recorded: September 23, 24 & 25, 1969
- Studio: Van Gelder Studio, Englewood Cliffs, New Jersey
- Genre: Soul jazz, jazz fusion
- Label: A&M/CTI
- Producer: Creed Taylor

Kai Winding chronology
Betwixt & Between (1969)	J & K: Stonebone (1970)	Danish Blue (1976)

J. J. Johnson chronology
Betwixt & Between (1969)	J & K: Stonebone (1969)	The Yokohama Concert (1977)

Stonebone is an album by jazz trombonists Kai Winding and J. J. Johnson featuring performances recorded in 1969 and released by CTI only in Japan.

Album subsequently issued in 2020 for the October 24th Record Store Day. It was a red vinyl pressing for Europe and US distribution . Re-issue contains the same track listing, durations cover art, but with only English language sleeve notes etc.

== Reception ==
The Allmusic review by Richard S. Ginell awarded the album 4½ stars and stated "It is a prototype of the CTI formula of the '70s, allowing first-class jazz musicians to groove at length with minimal shaping on the production end to give these tracks drama".

Professional ratings
Review scores
Source	Rating
Allmusic	4.5/5 stars

== Track listing ==
1. "Dontcha Hear Me Callin' to Ya?" (Rudy Stevenson)
2. "Musings" (Johnson)
3. "Mojo" (Johnson)
4. "Recollections" (Joe Zawinul)

== Personnel ==
- J. J. Johnson – trombone
- Kai Winding – trombone
- Herbie Hancock – keyboards
- Bob James – keyboards
- Ross Tompkins – keyboards
- George Benson – guitar
- Ron Carter – double bass
- Grady Tate – drums
