= Groove Merchant (album) =

Studio album by Jerome Richardson
- Released: 1968
- Recorded: December 8, 1967
- Studio: Van Gelder Studio, Englewood Cliffs, New Jersey
- Genre: Jazz
- Length: 33:08
- Label: Verve; V/V6 8729
- Producer: Esmond Edwards

Jerome Richardson chronology
Going to the Movies (1962)	Groove Merchant (1968)	Jazz Station Runaway (1996)

Groove Merchant is an album by saxophonist Jerome Richardson, featuring jazz versions of then-current pop hits, recorded in 1967 and released on the Verve label the following year.

Professional ratings
Review scores
Source	Rating
Allmusic	2/5 stars

== Track listing ==
1. "Groove Merchant" (Jerome Richardson) – 5:58
2. "To Sir with Love" (Mark London, Don Black) – 3:08
3. "Gimmie Little Sign" (Alfred Smith, Jerry Winn, Joseph Hooven) – 2:20
4. "No Matter What Shape (Your Stomach's In)" (Granville "Sascha" Burland) – 2:27
5. "Girl, You'll Be a Woman Soon" (Neil Diamond) – 2:34
6. "Knock on Wood" (Steve Cropper, Eddie Floyd) – 2:35
7. "Ode to Billie Joe" (Bobbie Gentry) – 2:58
8. "Sunny" (Bobby Hebb) – 3:40
9. "Where Is Love" (Richardson) – 3:30
10. "Up, Up and Away" (Jimmy Webb) – 3:56

== Personnel ==
- Jerome Richardson – tenor saxophone, soprano saxophone, flute, bass flute
- Joe Newman, Snooky Young – trumpet
- Alan Raph – trombone
- Buddy Lucas – baritone saxophone, harmonica
- Ernie Hayes – piano, organ
- Eric Gale, Carl Lynch – guitar
- Chuck Rainey – electric bass
- Grady Tate – drums
- Warren Smith – percussion
- Benny Golson – arranger, conductor
