= Solo (Kai Winding album) =

Studio album by Kai Winding
- Released: 1963
- Recorded: January 24 and February 4 & 5, 1963; New York City
- Genre: Jazz
- Label: Verve; V/V6 8525
- Producer: Creed Taylor

Kai Winding chronology
Suspense Themes in Jazz (1962)	Solo (1963)	Soul Surfin' (1963)

Solo is an album by jazz trombonist and arranger Kai Winding recorded in 1963 for the Verve label.

== Reception ==
Professional ratings
Review scores
Source	Rating
Allmusic	4/5 stars

The Allmusic review by Scott Yanow observed "Trombonist Kai Winding is not here featured on unaccompanied solos despite the title of this album, but it does showcase his horn without the usual three or four trombones that he regularly used during the period. ...this is one of Winding's best (and least commercial) recordings of the 1960s".

== Track listing ==
1. "How Are Things in Glocca Morra?" (Burton Lane, Yip Harburg) - 3:00
2. "Recardo (Bossa Nova)" (Luiz Antonio, Djalma Ferreira) - 3:45
3. "Playboy's Theme" (Cy Coleman, Carolyn Leigh) - 2:31
4. "The Things We Did Last Summer" (Jule Styne, Sammy Cahn) - 3:42
5. "The Sweetest Sounds" (Richard Rodgers) - 2:47
6. "Hey There" (Jerry Ross, Richard Adler) - 3:30
7. "I'm Your Bunny Bossa Nova" (Kai Winding) - 2:45
8. "Days of Wine and Roses" (Henry Mancini, Johnny Mercer) - 2:13
9. "You've Changed" (Bill Carey, Carl T. Fischer) - 3:24
10. "I Believe in You" (Frank Loesser) - 3:12
11. "Capricious" (Billy Taylor) - 2:08

== Personnel ==
- Kai Winding - trombone
- Ross Tompkins - piano
- Dick Garcia - guitar (tracks 2, 7 & 11)
- Russell George - bass
- Tommy Check (tracks 3, 5, 9 & 10), Gus Johnson (tracks 1, 2, 4, 6–8 & 11) - drums
