= Dance to the City Beat =

Studio album by The Kai Winding Trombones
- Released: 1959
- Recorded: November 11, 1958 and January 5 & 16, 1959; New York City
- Genre: Jazz
- Label: Columbia; CL 1329 / CS 8136

Kai Winding chronology
The Swingin' States (1958)	Dance to the City Beat (1959)	The Great Kai & J. J. (1960)

Dance to the City Beat is an album by American jazz trombonist Kai Winding featuring performances recorded in late 1958 and early 1959 for the Columbia label. The album features tunes relating to American cities.

== Reception ==
Professional ratings
Review scores
Source	Rating
Allmusic	3/5 stars

Allmusic awarded the album 3 stars.

== Track listing ==
1. "(Sidewalks of) Manhattan" (Richard Rodgers, Lorenz Hart) - 3:06
2. "Lower Boneville" (Kai Winding) - 2:48
3. "St. Louis Blues" (W. C. Handy) - 3:38
4. "Chattanooga Choo Choo" (Harry Warren, Mack Gordon) - 2:52
5. "Moon Over Miami" (Joe Burke, Edgar Leslie) - 2:08
6. "Shuffle Off to Buffalo" (Warren, Al Dubin) - 2:37
7. "(I've Got a Gal in) Kalamazoo" (Warren, Gordon) - 2:54
8. "Charleston" (James P. Johnson, Cecil Mack) - 3:09
9. "On the Atchison, Topeka and the Santa Fe" (Warren, Johnny Mercer) - 3:03
10. "Cha Cha Chicago" (Fred Fisher) - 2:36
11. "Mobile" (David Holt, Robert Wells) - 2:58
12. "I'm a Ding Dong Daddy from Dumas" (Phil Baxter) - 2:56
- Recorded in New York City on November 11, 1958 (tracks 1, 4, 5 & 10), January 5, 1959 (tracks 2, 3, 8 & 9) and January 16, 1959 (tracks 6, 7, 11 & 12).

== Personnel ==
- Kai Winding – trombone, arranger
- Frank Rehak – trombone
- Dick Hixon, Rod Levitt – bass trombone
- Al Epstein – baritone saxophone (tracks 1, 4, 5 & 10)
- Hank Jones – piano
- Barry Galbraith – guitar (tracks 1, 4, 5 & 10)
- Joe Benjamin (tracks 2, 3, 8 & 9), Milt Hinton (tracks 1, 4–7 & 10–12) – bass
- Osie Johnson (tracks 1, 4–7 & 10–12), Charlie Persip (tracks 2, 3, 8 & 9) – drums
- Johnny Pacheco – congas, bongos (tracks 1, 4, 5 & 10)
