= Penny Lane & Time =

Studio album by Kai Winding
- Released: 1967
- Recorded: February 2, 9 & 13 and March 2, 1967
- Studio: Van Gelder Studio, Englewood Cliffs, NJ
- Genre: Jazz
- Length: 30:34
- Label: Verve; V/V6 8691
- Producer: Creed Taylor

Kai Winding chronology
Dirty Dog (1966)	Penny Lane & Time (1967)	Israel (1968)

Penny Lane & Time is an album by jazz trombonist and arranger Kai Winding recorded in 1967 for the Verve label.

== Reception ==
Professional ratings
Review scores
Source	Rating
Allmusic	3/5 stars

The Allmusic review by Tony Wilds said "Winding wisely plays less and takes up the full pen and baton duties. His ideas and the other players' chops are well worth hearing".

== Track listing ==
1. "Penny Lane" (John Lennon, Paul McCartney) - 2:25
2. "Time" (George Martin, Norman Newell) - 2:31
3. "A Man and a Woman" (Francis Lai, Pierre Barouh) - 2:50
4. "Here, There and Everywhere" (Lennon, McCartney) - 2:10
5. "Amor Em Paz" (Antônio Carlos Jobim, Vinicius de Moraes) - 3:46
6. "Eleanor Rigby" (Lennon, McCartney) - 2:37
7. "Lugar Bonito (Pretty Place)" (Carlos Lyra, Norman Gimbel) - 2:41
8. "A Time for Love" (Johnny Mandel, Paul Francis Webster) - 2:25
9. "Amy's Theme" (John Sebastian) - 3:29
10. "Mini-Skirt" (Kai Winding) - 3:25
11. "Battle Hymn of the Republic" (William Steffe, Julia Ward Howe) - 2:15
- Recorded at Van Gelder Studio in Englewood Cliffs, NJ on February 2, 1967 (tracks 1 & 2), February 9, 1967 (tracks 3 & 11), February 13, 1967 (tracks 5, 8 & 10) and March 2, 1967 (tracks 4, 6, 7 & 9)

== Personnel ==
- Kai Winding - trombone, arranger, conductor
- Bill Watrous - trombone (tracks 3, 4, 6, 7, 9 & 11)
- Thomas Mitchell - bass trombone (tracks 3, 4, 6, 7, 9 & 11)
- Danny Bank, Jerry Dodgion (tracks 1, 2 & 4–10), Hubert Laws, Romeo Penque, Jerome Richardson (tracks 3–11) - flute, alto flute, bass flute, piccolo
- Joe Beck (tracks 1 & 2), Bucky Pizzarelli (tracks 3–11) - guitar
- Ron Carter - bass
- Grady Tate - drums
