= Dirty Dog (album) =

Studio album by Kai Winding
- Released: 1966
- Recorded: March 28 and April 1, 1966
- Studio: A&R Recording Studio, NYC
- Genre: Jazz
- Length: 30:33
- Label: Verve; V/V6 8661
- Producer: Creed Taylor

Kai Winding chronology
More Brass (1966)	Dirty Dog (1966)	Penny Lane & Time (1967)

Dirty Dog is an album by jazz trombonist and arranger Kai Winding recorded in 1966 for the Verve label.

== Reception ==
Professional ratings
Review scores
Source	Rating
Allmusic	3/5 stars

The Allmusic site awarded the album 3 stars.

== Track listing ==
1. "Dirty Dog" (Al Gafa) - 3:38
2. "Sunrise, Sunset" (Jerry Bock, Sheldon Harnick) - 5:50
3. "Cantaloupe Island" (Herbie Hancock) - 5:41
4. "Blindman, Blindman" (Hancock) - 4:42
5. "Something You Got" (Chris Kenner) - 5:06
6. "The Sidewinder" (Lee Morgan) - 5:36
- Recorded at A&R Recording Studio, NYC on March 28, 1966 (tracks 3, 4 & 6) and April 1, 1966 (tracks 1, 2 & 5)

== Personnel ==
- Kai Winding - trombone, arranger, conductor
- Carl Fontana, Urbie Green, Bill Watrous - trombone
- Herbie Hancock - piano
- Kenny Burrell [listed as Buzzy Bavarian] - guitar
- Bob Cranshaw - bass
- Grady Tate - drums
