= Dino Piana =

Italian jazz trombonist (1930–2023)

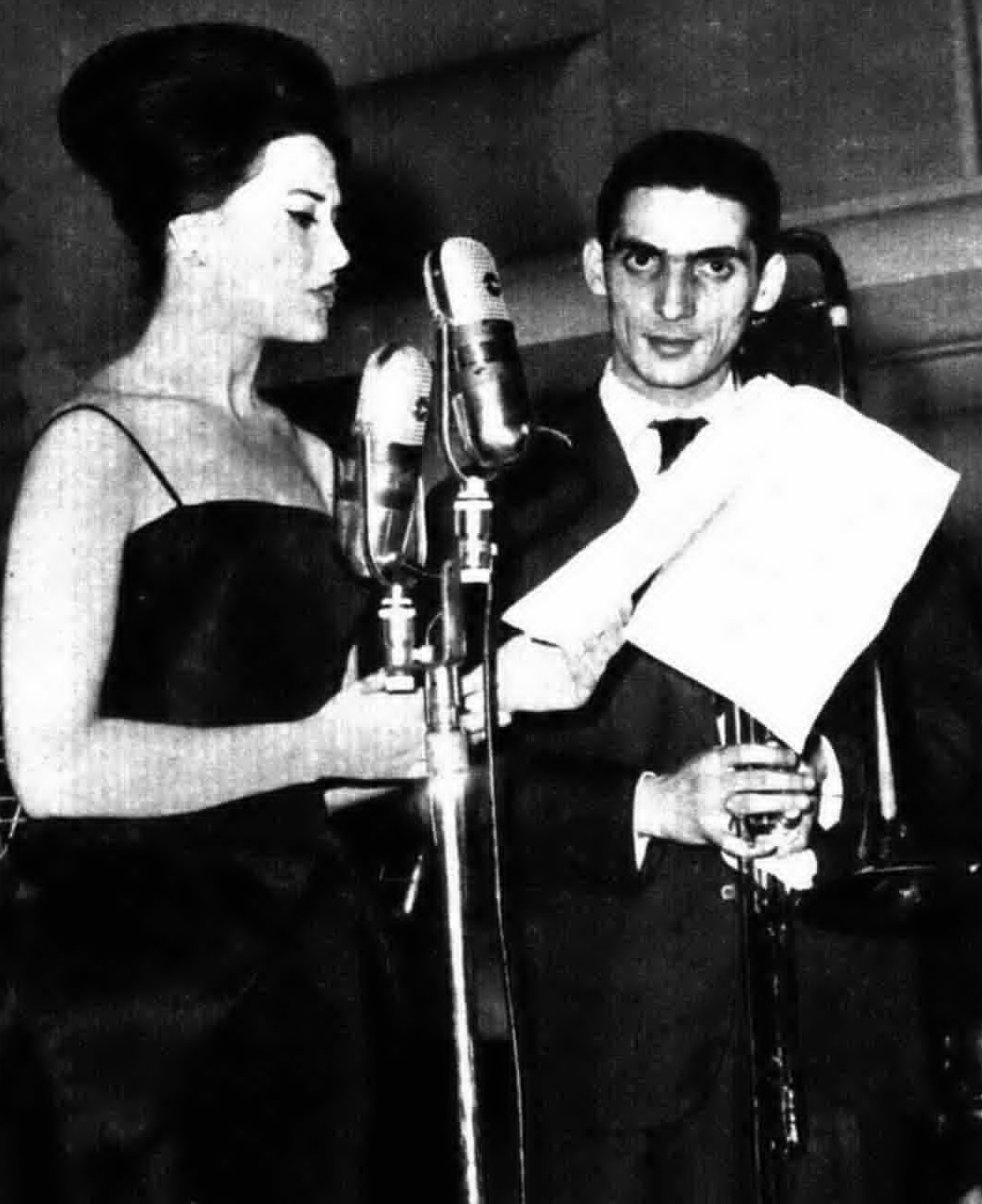
- Piana with Brunella Tocci (1960)
- Born: 3 August 1930; Refrancore, Asti, Italy
- Died: 6 November 2023 (aged 93); Rome, Italy
- Occupation: Trombonist

Dino Piana (3 August 1930 – 6 November 2023) was an Italian jazz trombonist.

== Life and career ==
Born in Refrancore into a family of confectioners, Piana studied trumpet and accordion before switching to trombone at the age of 15. He started his professional career in the late 1950s with the Quintetto di Torino, and became first known in 1959, thanks to the participation to the radio contest "La coppa del jazz" ('The Cup of Jazz'). In 1969 he entered the RAI orchestra, with whom he stayed until 1995. Starting from 1978 he collaborated with his son Franco, who is a flugelhorn player and a composer.

During his career, Piana was part of the big bands of Thad Jones and Bob Brookmeyer, and his collaborations include Charles Mingus, Chet Baker, Gerry Mulligan, Gato Barbieri, Kai Winding, Enrico Rava, Pedro Iturralde, Romano Mussolini, Paolo Conte, Kenny Clarke, Frank Rosolino, Giorgio Gaslini, Gil Cuppini. Active with his Dino e Franco Piana Jazz Orchestra until a few months before his death, he died in his sleep on 6 November 2023, at the age of 93.
