= The Louis Bellson Explosion =

Studio album by Louis Bellson
- Released: 1975
- Recorded: May 21 & 22, 1975
- Studio: Los Angeles, CA
- Genre: Jazz
- Length: 53:00
- Label: Pablo; 2310 755
- Producer: Norman Granz

Louis Bellson chronology
150 MPH (1974)	The Louis Bellson Explosion (1975)	Louie Bellson's 7 (1976)

The Louis Bellson Explosion is an album by drummer Louis Bellson recorded in 1975 and released by the Pablo label.

== Reception ==
Professional ratings
Review scores
Source	Rating
AllMusic	3/5 stars
The Penguin Guide to Jazz Recordings	2/4 stars

AllMusic reviewer Ron Wynn stated "A fine mid-'70s date that was both a showcase for Bellson's bombastic drumming and also a nice straight-ahead date".

== Track listing ==
1. "The Intimacy of the Blues" (Billy Strayhorn) – 6:02
2. "Quiet Riots" (Jack Hayes, Bill Holman, Louie Bellson) – 5:30
3. "Carnaby Street" (Bellson, Hayes) – 6:45
4. "Beyond Category" (Hayes, Bellson) – 8:19
5. "Chameleon" (Herbie Hancock) – 4:33
6. "Open Your Window" (Harry Nilsson) – 5:17
7. "Movin' On" (John Bambridge) – 3:29
8. "Groove Blues" (Don Menza) – 7:11
9. "La Banda Grande" (Hayes, Bellson) – 5:25

== Personnel ==
- Louis Bellson – drums
- Cat Anderson, Dick Cooper, Blue Mitchell, Dick Mitchell, Bobby Shew, Snooky Young – trumpet
- Nick DiMaio, Gil Falco, Ernie Tack, Mayo Tiana – trombone
- Bill Byrne, Pete Christlieb, Larry Covelli, Don Menza, Dick Spencer – saxophones
- Nat Pierce, Ross Tompkins – keyboards
- Mitch Holder – guitar
- John Williams – bass
- Dave Levine, Paulo Magalhaes – percussion
