= Israel (album) =

Studio album by Kai Winding and J. J. Johnson
- Released: 1968
- Recorded: February 19; March 4, 12 and April 16, 1968
- Studio: Van Gelder Studio (Englewood Cliffs)
- Genre: Jazz
- Length: 42:12
- Label: A&M/CTI; SP 3008
- Producer: Creed Taylor

Kai Winding chronology
Penny Lane & Time (1967)	Kai & J. J.: Israel (1968)	J & K, Betwixt & Between (1969)

J. J. Johnson chronology
The Total J.J. Johnson (1966)	Kai & J. J.: Israel (1968)	J & K, Betwixt & Between (1969)

Israel is an album by American jazz trombonists Kai Winding and J. J. Johnson featuring performances recorded in 1968 and released on the CTI label.

== Reception ==
Professional ratings
Review scores
Source	Rating
AllMusic	2/5 stars

Scott Yanow of AllMusic awarded the album two stars out of five, saying, "This date is a bit commercial, with a small string section and woodwinds utilized on five of the nine numbers. Still, the beautiful tones of the co-leaders make this a worthwhile set."

== Track listing ==
1. "My Funny Valentine" (Richard Rodgers, Lorenz Hart) – 4:23
2. "Israel" (John Carisi) – 5:22
3. "Catherine's Theme" (Francis Lai) – 5:14
4. "Am I Blue / Sonnyboy" (Harry Akst, Grant Clarke / Ray Henderson, Bud De Sylva, Lew Brown) – 4:32
5. "Never My Love" (Donald Addrisi, Richard Addrisi) – 2:53
6. "Saturday Night Is the Loneliest Night of the Week" (Jule Styne, Sammy Kahn) – 2:52
7. "St. James Infirmary" (Joe Primrose) – 4:04
8. "Django" (John Lewis) – 4:52
9. "Try to Remember" (Tom Jones, Harvey Schmidt) – 4:11
- Recorded at Van Gelder Studio in Englewood Cliffs, New Jersey on February 19 (tracks 5 and 6), March 4 (track 2), March 12 (tracks 3 and 7), and April 16 (tracks 1, 4, 8 and 9), 1968

== Personnel ==
- J. J. Johnson, Kai Winding – trombone
- Herbie Hancock – piano
- Ross Tompkins – piano, harpsichord
- Eric Gale, Bucky Pizzarelli – guitar
- Ron Carter, Richard Davis – bass
- Grady Tate – drums
- Phil Bodner, George Marge, Romeo Penque – flute, oboe, clarinet
- Walter Kane, Frank Schwartz – bassoon
- Lewis Eley, Leo Kruczek, Charles Libove, David Nadien, Eugene Orloff, Tosha Samaroff – violin
- Al Brown – viola
- George Ricci – cello
- Eugene Bianco – harp
- Don Sebesky, J. J. Johnson, Kai Winding – arranger, conductor
