= Trombone Panorama =

Studio album by The Kai Winding Septet
- Released: 1957
- Recorded: December 19–21, 1956 and February 20, 1957; New York City
- Genre: Jazz
- Labels: Columbia; CL 999
- Producer: George Avakian

Kai Winding chronology
| The Trombone Sound (1956) | Trombone Panorama (1957) | The Axidentals with the Kai Winding Trombones (1958) |

Trombone Panorama is an album by American jazz trombonist Kai Winding featuring performances recorded in late 1956 and early 1957 for the Columbia label.

== Reception ==
Professional ratings
Review scores
| Source | Rating |
|---|---|
| Allmusic | 3/5 stars |
| The Penguin Guide to Jazz Recordings | 3/4 stars |

The Allmusic awarded the album 3 stars and stated "Trombone Panorama was the first of several albums Kai Winding was to cut during the mid-'50s and early 1960s where he was joined by a shifting cast of fellow trombone players... The flowing seamless technique employed by these top slide-instrument artists resulted in a graceful, mellifluous sound that gave these recordings a chamber jazz feel".

== Track listing ==
1. "Trombone Panorama: Fanfare/Lassus Trombone/Muskrat Ramble/I Gotta Right to Sing the Blues/The Sidewalks of New York/Margie/I'm Getting Sentimental Over You/Kaye's Melody/Moonlight Serenade/Bijou/Collaboration/It's All Right with Me/Potpourri" (Kai Winding/Henry Fillmore/Kid Ory/Harold Arlen, Ted Koehler/Charles B. Lawlor, James W. Blake/Con Conrad, J. Russel Robinson, Benny Davis/George Bassman, Ned Washington/Sammy Kaye/Glenn Miller, Mitchell Parish/Ralph Burns/Pete Rugolo, Stan Kenton/Cole Porter/Winding) - 16:44
2. "The Party's Over" (Jule Styne, Betty Comden, Adolph Green) - 3:33
3. "The Preacher" (Horace Silver) - 3:23
4. "Come Rain or Come Shine" (Harold Arlen, Johnny Mercer) - 3:29
5. "When the Red, Red Robin (Comes Bob, Bob, Bobbin' Along)" (Harry M. Woods) - 3:11
6. "I Can't Give You Anything But Love" (Jimmy McHugh, Dorothy Fields) - 3:13
7. "Frankie and Johnny" (Traditional) - 6:59

== Personnel ==
- Kai Winding – trombone, narration
- Wayne Andre, Carl Fontana – trombone
- Dick Leib – bass trombone
- Roy Frazee – piano
- Kenny O'Brien – bass
- Jack Franklin, Tom Montgomery – drums
