= Betwixt & Between =

Studio album by Kai Winding and J. J. Johnson
- Released: 1969
- Recorded: October 22 & 29, November 15 & 26 and December 5, 1968 and January 9, 1969
- Studio: Van Gelder Studio, Englewood Cliffs, NJ
- Genre: Jazz
- Length: 32:54
- Label: A&M/CTI; SP 3016
- Producer: Creed Taylor

Kai Winding chronology
Kai & J. J.: Israel (1968)	J & K: Betwixt & Between (1969)	J & K: Stonebone (1969)

J. J. Johnson chronology
Kai & J. J.: Israel (1968)	J & K: Betwixt & Between (1969)	J & K: Stonebone (1969)

Betwixt & Between is an album by American jazz trombonists Kai Winding and J. J. Johnson featuring performances recorded in 1968 and released on the CTI label. The album features jazz interpretations of popular tunes linked by brief Baroque interludes.

== Reception ==
The AllMusic review by Richard S. Ginell awarded the album 3 stars and stated "there are experiments all over this quintessentially '60s project... A fascinating, no doubt controversial, record".

Professional ratings
Review scores
Source	Rating
AllMusic	3/5 stars

== Track listing ==
1. "Casa Forte/Bach Chorale #237" (Edu Lobo/Johann Sebastian Bach) - 4:20
2. "Betwixt & Between/Plus Nine" (Anthony Dorsey/Kai Winding) - 3:30
3. "Little Drummer Boy/Troika" (Katherine Kennicott Davis/Bach) - 2:10
4. "Don't Go Love, Don't Go/Bach Chorale #241" (J. A. Ryan, Jim Lacy/Bach) - 3:30
5. "Mojave/Bach Chorale #134" (Antônio Carlos Jobim/Bach) - 3:30
6. "Stormy" (Buddy Buie, James Cobb) - 2:40
7. "Smoky/Onion Rings Rondo" (J. J. Johnson/Kai Winding) - 3:20
8. "Wichita Lineman/Bach Invention #4" (Jimmy Webb/Bach) - 3:04
9. "Just a Funky Old Vegetable Bin/Bach Invention #1" (Roger Kellaway/Bach) - 3:20
10. "Willie, Come Home" (J. Millar, R, George) - 3:30
- Recorded at Van Gelder Studio in Englewood Cliffs, New Jersey on October 22 & 29, November 15 & 26 and December 5, 1968 and January 9, 1969

== Personnel ==
- J. J. Johnson, Kai Winding - trombone, arranger
- Marvin Stamm - flugelhorn
- Tony Studd - bass trombone
- Paul Ingraham - French horn
- Herbie Hancock - piano
- Charles Covington - organ
- Roger Kellaway - clavinet, arranger
- Joe Beck, Eric Gale, Stuart Scharf - guitar
- Chuck Domanico, Russell George, Chuck Rainey - electric bass
- Ron Carter - bass
- Leo Morris, Denny Seiwell - drums
- Airto Moreira - drums, finger cymbals
- Warren Smith - tambourine
- Fred Buldrini, Lewis Eley, Harry Glickman, Emanuel Green, George Ockner, Raoul Poliakin, Max Pollikoff, Joyce Robbins, Aaron Rosand, Tosha Samaroff, Julius Schacter, Jack Zayde - violin
