= Ted Raph =

American trombonist (1905–1991)

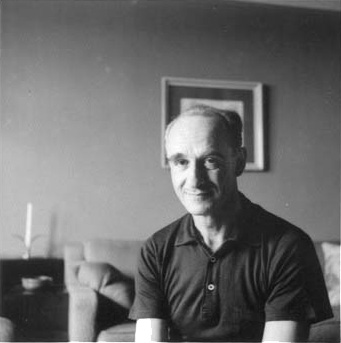
- Ted Raph at home
- Born: Jehial Isadore Raph; September 14, 1905; Boston, Massachusetts, U.S.
- Died: December 20, 1991 (aged 86); Scottsdale, Arizona, U.S.
- Spouse(s): Marion McGuire, Janet Hughes, Jane Beasley
- Relatives: Alan Raph (son)
- Musical career
- Genre: Jazz
- Occupations: Musician, Composer, Arranger
- Instruments: Trombone; Piano
- Years active: 1930–1968
- Labels: Columbia and others

Theodore Earl Raph (September 14, 1905 – December 20, 1991) was a professional trombonist who played Dixieland jazz with touring groups during the 1930s and 1940s. He recorded with the California Ramblers and Phil Napoleon and other New York dance bands. He arranged music for popular radio and television shows, including Name That Tune. He published two books of popular American music that are still in print more than 50 years after they were first published.

== Personal life ==
Ted Raph was born in Boston, Massachusetts. He was the son of Louis Raffiewitz and Sarah Ann Gorney, Jewish immigrants from the area of Nezhin, Ukraine, Russia. His father's surname was changed by immigration authorities during registration when he entered the U.S. In 1905, Louis was a clothier. His maternal grandparents were Irish. His grandfather Mathew A. McGuire was born in Ballyhaunis, Mayo, Ireland. Like other Jewish band members, such as pianist Joel Shaw and drummer Smith Howard whose real names were Joel Schwartz and Sal Horowitz, Raph changed his name legally from Jehial Isadore Raph to Theodore Earl Raph on March 24, 1930.

He married Marion McGuire in 1930, and in 1933 they had had a son, Alan Raph, who later became a noted bass trombonist, composer, and conductor. After they divorced, Raph married Janet Hughes in 1950. They divorced and in 1958 Raph married Jane Beasley, a professor of early childhood education at Rutgers University. They remained married until his death in 1991.

== Professional career ==
During the 1920s, Raph played Dixieland trombone with touring musicians such as Phil Napoleon, The Emperors, The California Ramblers, The Goofus Five and Their Orchestra, and Ermine Calloway in the eastern U.S.

Raph composed and arranged for big bands in the 1930s. He served in the U.S. Army from 1943 to 1945 in the Special Services Division at the Signal Corps Photographic Center conducting, composing, and arranging music for movie shorts, transcriptions, and radio shows. The Signal Corps center on Long Island in Astoria, New York, had been converted from thirteen buildings originally owned by Paramount Pictures Company, including a sound stage and a complete studio built in the 1930s.

He conducted for Stop the Music, an American radio show and television quiz show. He followed that by arranging music for Name That Tune on the radio from 1952 to 1953 and on TV from 1953 to 1959. He then arranged music for the television show Yours for a Song from 1961 to 1963.

== Publications ==
Raph published two collections of sheet music in the 1960s which contained easy piano arrangements, guitar chords, and lyrics: The American Song Treasury: 100 Favorites (1964), and Songs We Sang, a Treasury of American Popular Sheet Music (1971).

== Singles and LPs ==
Ted Raph and His Orchestra released three singles and LPs.

- "Ev'rything That's Nice Belongs to You" / "Dream a Little Dream of Me" (1931)
- "Dream a Little Dream of Me" / "Please Don't Talk About Me When I'm Gone" (1931)
- Paul Specht And His Orchestra / Teddy Raph And His Orchestra - "I Found a Million Dollar Baby in a Five and Ten Cent Store"
- Please Don't Talk About When I'm Gone (1931)
- When I Take My Sugar to Tea (1931)
- Wrap Your Troubles in Dreams (And Dream Your Troubles Away) (1931)
