= The Trombone Sound =

Studio album by Kai Winding and His Septet
- Released: 1956
- Recorded: August 1, 2 & 3, 1956; New York City
- Genre: Jazz
- Label: Columbia; CL 936

Kai Winding chronology
Jay and Kai (1956)	The Trombone Sound (1956)	Trombone Panorama (1957)

The Trombone Sound is an album by American jazz trombonist Kai Winding featuring performances recorded in 1956 for the Columbia label.

== Reception ==
Professional ratings
Review scores
Source	Rating
Allmusic	3/5 stars

The Allmusic awarded the album 3 stars.

== Track listing ==
1. "Whistle While You Work" (Frank Churchill, Larry Morey) - 2:41
2. "My Little Girl" (Richard Rodgers) - 2:45
3. "Blue Room" (Rogers, Lorenz Hart) - 2:23
4. "Nutcracker" (Wayne Andre, Victor Feldman) - 2:49
5. "Breezin' Along with the Breeze" (Haven Gillespie, Richard A. Whiting, Seymour Simons) - 2:22
6. "Jim and Andy's" (Lou Stein) - 2:58
7. "Old School Ties" (Bob Brookmeyer) - 2:45
8. "Captain Kut-Cha" (Nat Pierce) - 3:14
9. "Every Girl Is My Valentine" (Tom Talbert) - 2:54
10. "Under a Blanket of Blues" (Al Cohn) - 4:08
11. "Sunday" (Chester Conn, Benny Krueger, Jule Styne, Ned Miller) - 3:18
12. "Nice Work If You Can Get It" (George Gershwin, Ira Gershwin) - 3:11
13. "I Want to Be Happy" (Vincent Youmans, Irving Caesar) - 2:58

== Personnel ==
- Kai Winding – trombone, arranger
- Wayne Andre, Carl Fontana – trombone
- Dick Leib – bass trombone
- Roy Frazee – piano, celeste
- Kenny O'Brien – bass
- Jack Franklin – drums
