= The In Instrumentals =

Studio album by Kai Winding
- Released: 1965
- Recorded: September 9, 23 & 28, 1965; NYC
- Genre: Jazz
- Label: Verve; V/V6 8639
- Producer: Creed Taylor

Kai Winding chronology
Rainy Day (1965)	The In Instrumentals (1965)	More Brass (1966)

The In Instrumentals is an album by jazz trombonist and arranger Kai Winding recorded in 1965 for the Verve label.

== Reception ==
Professional ratings
Review scores
Source	Rating
Allmusic	2.5/5 stars

The Allmusic review by Tony Wilds said "The In Instrumentals does not stick to the truly "in" mod tunes, nor does it do much with its standard pop and rock tunes. ...let's face it: the music manager of New York's Playboy Club may have been "in," but he wasn't exactly hip, at least not on this album".

== Track listing ==
1. "On Broadway" (Jerry Leiber, Mike Stoller, Cynthia Weil, Barry Mann) - 2:04
2. "Yesterday" (John Lennon, Paul McCartney) - 2:43
3. "You've Lost That Lovin' Feelin'" (Weil, Mann, Phil Spector) - 2:59
4. "Georgia On My Mind" (Hoagy Carmichael, Stuart Gorrell) - 2:30
5. "Looking Through the Eyes of Love" (Mann, Weil) - 2:40
6. "Mohair Sam" (Dallas Frazier) - 2:18
7. "Sign of the Times" (Kai Winding) - 2:29
8. "You've Got Your Troubles" (Roger Cook, Roger Greenaway) - 2:46
9. "I Know a Place" (Tony Hatch) - 2:31
10. "Spanish Harlem" (Leiber, Spector) - 2:39
11. "Anyone Who Had a Heart" (Burt Bacharach, Hal David) - 2:29
12. "Foxy" (Winding) - 2:06
- Recorded in NYC on September 9, 1965 (tracks 1 & 7), September 23, 1965 (tracks 5, 6, 9 & 12) and September 28, 1965 (tracks 3, 4, 8, 10 & 11)

== Personnel ==
- Kai Winding - trombone, arranger, conductor
- John Frosk, Irv Markowitz, Joe Shepley - trumpet, flugelhorn
- Wayne Andre, Jimmy Cleveland, Bill Watrous - trombone
- Tony Studd - bass trombone
- Charles de Angelis - flute, clarinet, alto saxophone, tenor saxophone
- Gene Orloff, Max Pollikoff, Paul Winter - violin
- Al Brown, David Mankowitz - viola
- Peter Makas, George Ricci, Sol Shapiro - cello
- Jerry Ragovoy - piano
- Paul Griffin - piano, organ, harpsichord
- Everett Barksdale, Al Gorgoni, Bill Suyker - guitar
- Russ Savakus - electric bass
- Gary Chester - drums
- Jack Jennings - percussion
- Don Sebesky (tracks 8 & 11), Garry Sherman (tracks 1–5, 9 & 10) - arranger, conductor
