= Kai Winding (album) =

Studio album by Kai Winding
- Released: 1963
- Recorded: August 7, September 19 & 26 and October 3, 1963; New York City
- Genre: Jazz
- Labels: Verve; V/V6 8556
- Producer: Creed Taylor

Kai Winding chronology
Soul Surfin' (1963)	Kai Winding (1963)	Mondo Cane #2 (1964)

Kai Winding is an album by jazz trombonist and arranger Kai Winding recorded in 1963 for the Verve label.

== Reception ==
Professional ratings
Review scores
Source	Rating
Allmusic	3/5 stars

The Allmusic review by Tony Wilds observed "Released between the classic More (Mondo Cane) albums, the eponymous Kai Winding serves up more mod trombone with ondioline and "water sound" guitar on some tracks. ...Unfortunately, there is no central theme and most of the tunes, brief as they are, rank as filler".

== Track listing ==
1. "Get Lost" (Claus Ogerman) - 2:38
2. "Only in America" (Jerry Leiber, Mike Stoller, Cynthia Weil, Barry Mann) - 2:22
3. "Hey, Girl" (Carole King, Gerry Goffin) - 3:05
4. "The Lonely One" (David Whitaker, Peter Pavey) - 2:15
5. "Theme from "Mr. Novak"" (Lyn Murray) - 1:52
6. "Washington Square" (Bob Goldstein) - 2:04
7. "The Ice Cream Man" (Joe Meek) - 2:15
8. "Mockingbird" (Charlie Fox, Inez Fox) - 2:15
9. "China Surf" (Ingrid Otto) - 2:40
10. "Burning Sands" (Werner Scharfenberger, Kurt Feltz) - 1:52
11. "Far Out East" (Kai Winding) - 2:00
12. "Oltre l'Amor" (Antonio de Paolis) - 2:05
- Recorded in New York City on August 7, 1963 (tracks 4, 5, 7, 10 & 12), September 19, 1963 (tracks 1, 9 & 11), September 26, 1963 (tracks 2 & 3) and October 3, 1963 (tracks 6 & 8)

== Personnel ==
- Kai Winding - trombone, arranger
- Gary Sherman - organ
- Other unidentified musicians
- Claus Ogerman - arranger, conductor
