= Kai Olé =

Studio album by Kai Winding's Trombones and Orchestra
- Released: 1961
- Recorded: January 24 and February 4 & 5, 1961; New York City
- Genre: Jazz
- Label: Verve; V/V6 8525
- Producer: Creed Taylor

Kai Winding chronology
The Incredible Kai Winding Trombones (1960)	Kai Olé (1961)	Suspense Themes in Jazz (1962)

Kai Olé is an album by jazz trombonist and arranger Kai Winding recorded in 1961 for the Verve label.

== Reception ==
Professional ratings
Review scores
Source	Rating
Allmusic	3/5 stars

The Allmusic review by Tony Wilds observed "Before Herb Alpert provided the hit transition from Latin brass to mod brass, Winding made this deluxe gatefold mod/Latin/jazz album. Surprisingly, Latin percussion yields him a lot more freedom than the yet more rigid big beat of the later, near-rock, mod sound. ...Kai Ole uniquely explores a new area of Latin jazz but never quite reaches critical mass".

== Track listing ==
1. "Hacia el Fin de la Terra (To The Ends Of The Earth)" (Noel Sherman, Joe Sherman) - 2:49
2. "Amor" (Gabriel Ruiz, the original Spanish lyrics by Ricardo López Méndez) - 2:42
3. "Them There Ojos (Them There Eyes)" (Maceo Pinkard, Doris Tauber and William Tracey) - 2:20
4. "Caribe" (Kai Winding) - 2:42
5. "Esto Es Felicidad" (Bobby Collazo, José Carbó Menéndez, Orlando De LaRosa) - 2:39
6. "Manteca" (Dizzy Gillespie, Chano Pozo, Gil Fuller) - 2:45
7. "Hojas de Otoño (Autumn Leaves)" (Joseph Kosma, Johnny Mercer) - 3:03
8. "Dansero" (Lee Daniels, Richard Hayman, Sol Parker) - 2:50
9. "Que Pasa?" (Winding) - 2:39
10. "Bésame Mucho" (Consuelo Velázquez) - 2:49
11. "Adios" (Enric Madriguera, Eddie Woods) - 2:23
12. "Surrey with the Fringe Arriba (Surrey with the Fringe on Top)" (Richard Rodgers, Oscar Hammerstein II) - 2:46

== Personnel ==
- Kai Winding, Billy Byers - trombone, arranger
- Joe Newman, Doc Severinsen - trumpet
- Clark Terry - flugelhorn
- Tony Studd, George West - bass trombone
- Phil Woods - alto saxophone
- Danny Bank - baritone saxophone, clarinet
- Ross Tompkins - piano
- Harold Gaylor - bass
- Ray Rodriguez - bongos
- Other unidentified musicians
