= Giant Bones '80 =

Studio album by Kai Winding and Curtis Fuller
- Released: 1980
- Recorded: November 23 & 24, 1979
- Studio: Studio 39, Copenhagen
- Genre: Jazz
- Length: 46:52
- Label: Sonet; SNTF 834
- Producer: Rune Öfwerman

Kai Winding chronology
Duo Bones (1972)	Giant Bones '80 (1980)	Giant Bones at Nice (1980)

Curtis Fuller chronology
Fire and Filigree (1978)	Giant Bones '80 (1980)	Giant Bones at Nice (1980)

Giant Bones '80 is an album by trombonists Kai Winding and Curtis Fuller which was recorded in Denmark in 1979 and released on the Swedish Sonet label.

== Reception ==
Professional ratings
Review scores
Source	Rating
AllMusic	4/5 stars

Allmusic awarded the album 4 stars noting "After a successful partnership with J.J. Johnson during the 1950s (with a few more meetings in the 1960s), it's not surprising that Kai Winding enjoyed hooking up with another trombonist from time to time. This meeting with Curtis Fuller, made for Sonet in 1979, rekindles the magic Winding experienced with Johnson, even with different material and musicians ... well worth acquiring".

== Track listing ==
All compositions by Kai Winding except where noted

1. "Love 4 Rent" – 6:47
2. "Sweetness" (Curtis Fuller) – 3:52
3. "I Fall in Love Too Easily" (Jule Styne, Sammy Cahn) – 4:37
4. "Scrapple from the Apple" (Charlie Parker) – 4:15
5. "Corriente" – 4:36
6. "Nu Groove" (Fuller) – 4:35
7. "Never Never Land" (Styne, Betty Comden, Adolph Green) – 5:45
8. "Hola" – 3:22

== Personnel ==
- Kai Winding, Curtis Fuller – trombone
- Horace Parlan – piano
- Mads Vinding – bass
- Ed Thigpen – drums
