= Four on the Outside =

Studio album by Curtis Fuller
- Released: 1978
- Recorded: September 18, 1978
- Studio: C.I. Recording Studio, New York City
- Genre: Jazz
- Length: 46:52
- Label: Timeless; SJP 124
- Producer: Wim Wigt

Curtis Fuller chronology
Smokin' (1972)	Four on the Outside (1978)	Fire and Filigree (1978)

Four on the Outside is an album by trombonist Curtis Fuller which was recorded in September 1978 and released on the Dutch Timeless label.

== Reception ==
Professional ratings
Review scores
Source	Rating
Allmusic	4/5 stars

Allmusic awarded the album 4 stars noting "While Curtis Fuller may have reached his peak in the 1960s, he continued to be an important voice well into the 1970s and beyond. This delightful set features him in a front line with Pepper Adams, and the trombone-baritone saxophone combination was a natural".

== Track listing ==
All compositions by Curtis Fuller except as indicated

1. "Four on the Outside" - 4:54
2. "Suite Kathy" - 13:04
3. "Hello, Young Lovers" (Oscar Hammerstein II, Richard Rodgers) - 5:11
4. "Little Dreams" - 7:49
5. "Ballad for Gabe-Wells" - 8:19
6. "Corrida del Torro" - 7:35

== Personnel ==
- Curtis Fuller - trombone
- Pepper Adams - baritone saxophone
- James Williams - piano
- Dennis Irwin - bass
- John Yarling - drums
