= The Total J.J. Johnson =

Studio album by J. J. Johnson
- Released: 1967
- Recorded: November 30 and December 2 & 5, 1966
- Studio: RCA Victor, New York City
- Genre: Jazz
- Length: 40:38
- Label: RCA Victor; LPM/LSP 3833
- Producer: Brad McCuen

J. J. Johnson chronology
Broadway Express (1965)	The Total J.J. Johnson (1967)	Israel (1968)

The Total J.J. Johnson is an album by jazz trombonist and arranger J. J. Johnson and Big Band recorded in 1966 for the RCA Victor label.

== Reception ==
Professional ratings
Review scores
Source	Rating
Allmusic	3/5 stars
The Penguin Guide to Jazz Recordings	2.5/4 stars

The Allmusic review by Scott Yanow observed "the emphasis is on the arranged ensembles, making this project an excellent example of Johnson's often-overlooked writing talents".

== Track listing ==
All compositions by J. J. Johnson.

1. "Say When" - 2:54
2. "Blue" - 5:45
3. "In Walked Horace" - 4:42
4. "Short Cake" - 2:42
5. "Space Walk" - 4:05
6. "Euro #1" - 5:54
7. "Ballade" - 3:47
8. "Little Dave" - 4:02
9. "Euro #2" 5:39
- Recorded at RCA Victor's Studio A in New York City on November 30, 1966 (tracks 1 & 7), December 2, 1966 (tracks 2, 3, 5 & 8) and December 5, 1966 (tracks 4, 6 & 9)

== Personnel ==
- J. J. Johnson - trombone, arranger, conductor
- Art Farmer, Danny Stiles, Snooky Young - trumpet
- Paul Faulise, Benny Powell - trombone
- Jerome Richardson - alto saxophone, clarinet, flute
- Phil Bodner - tenor saxophone, clarinet, flute, oboe
- Tommy Newsom - baritone saxophone, bass clarinet, flute
- Hank Jones - piano
- Ron Carter - bass
- Grady Tate - drums
