= Goodies (J. J. Johnson album) =

Studio album by J. J. Johnson
- Released: 1966
- Recorded: July 12, 13, 19 & 20, 1965
- Studio: RCA Victor's Studio A, New York City
- Genre: Jazz
- Label: RCA Victor; LPM/LSP 3458
- Producer: Jack Somer

J. J. Johnson chronology
J.J.! (1964)	Goodies (1966)	Broadway Express (1965)

Goodies is an album by American jazz trombonist and arranger J. J. Johnson with a big band recorded in 1965 for the RCA Victor label.

== Reception ==
Professional ratings
Review scores
Source	Rating
Allmusic	3.5/5 stars
The Penguin Guide to Jazz Recordings	3/4 stars

In his review for AllMusic, Jason Ankeny wrote, "Goodies captures J.J. Johnson's mid-'60s big band in full gallop. ...the music marries the nimble grooves of soul-jazz with the big, bold sensibilities of swing to stunning effect. Mastering adrenaline and atmosphere with equal aplomb, the music shifts effortlessly from powder keg dance melodies to lush, luminous ballad".

== Track listing ==
All compositions by J. J. Johnson except where noted.

1. "Feeling Good" (Anthony Newley, Leslie Bricusse) – 2:25
2. "The Seventh Son" (Willie Dixon) – 2:42
3. "How Insensitive" (Antônio Carlos Jobim, Vinícius de Moraes, Norman Gimbel) – 2:45
4. "Pense à Moi" (Maurice "Bugs" Bower, Jack Wolf, Jaques Datin) – 2:02
5. "008" – 2:06
6. "In the Name of Love" (Estelle Levitt, Kenny Rankin) – 2:03
7. "G'won Train" (Patricia Brown) – 2:57
8. "No Particular Place to Go" (Chuck Berry) – 2:10
9. "Água de Beber" (Jobim, de Moraes, Gimbel) – 2:28
10. "Incidental Blues" – 2:40
11. "I'm All Smiles" (Michael Leonard, Herbert Martin) – 1:57
12. "Billy Boy" – 2:51
- Recorded at RCA Victor's Studio A in New York City on July 12, 1965 (tracks 4 & 9), July 13, 1965 (tracks 1, 3, 7 & 11), July 19, 1965 (tracks 2, 6 & 8) and July 20, 1965 (tracks 5, 10 & 12)

== Personnel ==
- J. J. Johnson – trombone, arranger
- Clark Terry – trumpet, flugelhorn
- Alan Raph, Tony Studd (tracks 1, 3, 7, 11) – bass trombone
- Ray Sterling – mellophone
- Jerome Richardson – alto saxophone, flute, tenor saxophone
- Phil Bodner, Romeo Penque (tracks 4, 5, 9, 12) – reeds, flute
- Danny Bank – baritone saxophone, flute, bass clarinet (tracks 1–3, 6–8 & 11)
- Barry Galbraith (tracks 2, 6 & 8), Carl Lynch (tracks 2, 6 & 8), Bucky Pizzarelli (tracks 1, 3, 4, 7, 9 & 11) – guitar
- Dick Hyman – piano, arranger (tracks 5, 10 & 12)
- Richard Davis – bass
- Sol Gubin (tracks 2, 6 & 8), Osie Johnson (tracks 5, 10 & 12), Bob Rosengarden (tracks: 1, 3, 4, 7, 9 & 11) – drums
- Doug Allen (tracks 4 & 9), John Pacheco (tracks 4 & 9), Phil Kraus (tracks 1, 3, 7 & 11), Warren Smith (tracks 2, 6, 8) – Percussion
- Marlene VerPlanck (tracks 4 & 9), Osie Johnson (tracks 2, 6 & 8) – vocals
- Unidentified choir – backing vocals (tracks 1, 3, 7 & 11)
- Billy Byers (tracks 4 & 9), Slide Hampton (tracks 2, 6 & 8) – arranger
