= Jay and Kai =

Studio album by J. J. Johnson and Kai Winding
- Released: April 1957
- Recorded: November 17, 1955, July 18 and December 17, 1956 and January 27, 1957; New York City
- Genre: Jazz
- Label: Columbia; CL 973

Kai Winding chronology
Dave Brubeck and Jay & Kai at Newport (1956)	Jay and Kai (1957)	The Trombone Sound (1956)

J. J. Johnson chronology
Dave Brubeck and Jay & Kai at Newport (1956)	Jay and Kai (1957)	J Is for Jazz (1957)

Jay and Kai is an album by American jazz trombonists J. J. Johnson and Kai Winding featuring performances recorded in 1955 and 1956 for the Columbia label.

== Reception ==
Professional ratings
Review scores
Source	Rating
Allmusic	3/5 stars

Allmusic awarded the album 3 stars and stated "Not a classic jazz set, but comfortable enough for the fans of the duo".

== Track listing ==
1. "You'd Be So Nice to Come Home To" (Cole Porter) - 3:30
2. "Caribe" (Kai Winding) - 2:41
3. "Happiness Is a Thing Called Joe" (Harold Arlen, Yip Harburg) - 3:40
4. "The Song Is You" (Jerome Kern, Oscar Hammerstein II) - 4:02
5. "In the Wee Small Hours of the Morning" (David Mann, Bob Hilliard) - 4:14
6. "Yes, You" (Dick Leib) - 3:27
7. "Tromboniums in Motion" (J. J. Johnson) - 3:40
8. "How High the Moon" (Morgan Lewis, Nancy Hamilton) - 2:33
9. "Violets for Your Furs" (Matt Dennis, Tom Adair) - 4:20
10. "Too Close for Comfort" (Jerry Bock, George David Weiss, Larry Holofcener) - 3:26
11. "'S Wonderful" (George Gershwin, Ira Gershwin) - 3:08
12. "I Should Care" (Axel Stordahl, Paul Weston, Sammy Cahn) - 3:54
- Recorded at Columbia 30th Street Studios in New York City on November 17, 1955 (tracks 1–5), July 18, 1956 (tracks 7–11), December 17, 1956 (track 6) and January 27, 1957 (track 12)

== Personnel ==
- J. J. Johnson (tracks 1–5 & 7–12), Kai Winding (tracks 1–11) – trombone, trombonium
- Bobby Jaspar – tenor saxophone (track 12)
- Wayne Andre, Carl Fontana – trombone (track 6)
- Dick Leib – bass trombone (track 6)
- Roy Frazee (track 6), Hank Jones (track 12), Dick Katz (tracks 1–5 & 7–11) – piano
- Bill Crow (tracks 7–11), Percy Heath (track 12), Milt Hinton (tracks 1–5), Kenny O'Brien (track 6) – bass
- Kenny Clarke (tracks 7–11), Jack Franklin (track 6), Elvin Jones (track 12), Shadow Wilson (tracks 1–6) – drums
- Candido Camero – bongos (track 2)
