= Suspense Themes in Jazz =

Studio album by Kai Winding
- Released: 1962
- Recorded: July 18, 19 & 26 and August 23, 1962
- Studio: Van Gelder Studio, Englewood Cliffs, NJ and New York City
- Genre: Jazz
- Length: 29:48
- Label: Verve; V/V6 8493
- Producer: Creed Taylor

Kai Winding chronology
Kai Olé (1961)	Suspense Themes in Jazz (1962)	Solo (1963)

Suspense Themes in Jazz is an album by jazz trombonist and arranger Kai Winding featuring jazz arrangements of theme music from motion pictures recorded in 1962 for the Verve label.

Professional ratings
Review scores
Source	Rating
AllMusic	3/5 stars

== Track listing ==
1. "Night Side" (Henry Mancini) - 2:29
2. "Experiment in Terror" (Mancini) - 2:20
3. "Walk on the Wild Side" (Elmer Bernstein, Mack David) - 2:20
4. "The 3rd Man Theme" (Anton Karas, Walter Lord) - 2:15
5. "Stella by Starlight" (Victor Young, Ned Washington) - 2:14
6. "Molly Malone" (Traditional) - 2:55
7. "Hatari" (Mancini) - 2:28
8. "Just for Tonight" (Hoagy Carmichael, Johnny Mercer) - 2:14
9. "Baby Elephant Walk" (Mancini) - 2:35
10. "Blues Theme from "Reprieve" (Ya Hear Me)" (Leonard Rosenman, Lenny Adelson) - 2:35
11. "Advise & Consent" (Jerry Fielding) - 2:35
12. "Laura" (David Raksin, Mercer) - 2:48

== Personnel ==
- Kai Winding - trombone, arranger
- Unidentified band and orchestra
- Oliver Nelson - arranger (tracks 2, 3, 6, 7, 9 & 10)
