= Fire and Filigree =

Studio album by Curtis Fuller
- Released: 1979
- Recorded: December 6, 1978
- Studio: Master Sound Productions, Franklin Square, NY
- Genre: Jazz
- Length: 42:56
- Label: Bee Hive; BH 7007

Curtis Fuller chronology
| Four on the Outside (1978) | Fire and Filigree (1979) | Giant Bones '80 (1980) |

Fire and Filigree is a studio album by American jazz trombonist Curtis Fuller, released on December 6, 1978, via Bee Hive Records label.

== Reception ==
Professional ratings
Review scores
| Source | Rating |
|---|---|
| AllMusic | 4/5 stars |
| DownBeat | 3.5/5 stars |

Scott Yanow of AllMusic stated: "For this excellent hard bop date, trombonist Curtis Fuller and the powerful tenor Sal Nistico make for a potent front line. With pianist Walter Bishop Jr., bassist Sam Jones and drummer Freddie Waits keeping the momentum flowing, the quintet performs two Fuller originals, Kenny Dorham's 'Minor's Holiday', and three standards. Although the bop-oriented BeeHive label has since become inactive, one might be able to find this swinging and enjoyable album, one of Curtis Fuller's best sets of the era."

== Track listing ==
| No. | Title | Writer(s) | Length |
|---|---|---|---|
| 1. | "Minor's Holiday" | Kenny Dorham | 3:45 |
| 2. | "Ballad For Gabe Wells" | Curtis Fuller | 10:14 |
| 3. | "Hello Young Lovers" | Oscar Hammerstein II, Richard Rodgers | 8:02 |
| 4. | "The Egyptian" | Curtis Fuller | 7:52 |
| 5. | "Yesterdays" | Jerome Kern, Otto Harbach | 7:13 |
| 6. | "Blue Monk" | Thelonious Monk | 5:50 |

== Personnel ==
- Bass – Sam Jones
- Drums – Freddie Waits
- Piano – Walter Bishop, Jr.
- Tenor saxophone – Sal Nistico
- Trombone – Curtis Fuller
