= Broadway Express (album) =

Studio album by J. J. Johnson
- Released: 1966
- Recorded: December 13, 16 & 17, 1965; RCA Victor Studio A, New York City
- Genre: Jazz
- Label: RCA Victor; LPM/LSP 3544
- Producer: Brad McCuen

J. J. Johnson chronology
Goodies (1965)	Broadway Express (1966)	The Total J.J. Johnson (1966)

Broadway Express is an album by jazz trombonist and arranger J.J. Johnson and Orchestra featuring jazz version of Broadway musical songs conducted and arranged by Mundell Lowe and recorded in late 1965 for the RCA Victor label.

== Reception ==
Professional ratings
Review scores
Source	Rating
AllMusic	3/5 stars
The Penguin Guide to Jazz Recordings	3/4 stars

AllMusic awarded the album 3 stars.

== Track listing ==
1. "Come Back to Me" (Burton Lane, Alan Jay Lerner) - 2:09
2. "Night Song" (Charles Strouse, Lee Adams) - 3:00
3. "Once in a Lifetime" (Anthony Newley, Leslie Bricusse) - 2:13
4. "More Than One Way" (Jimmy Van Heusen, Sammy Cahn) - 2:02
5. "I Believe In You" (Frank Loesser) - 2:13
6. "Goodbye, Old Girl" (Richard Adler, Jerry Ross) - 2:40
7. "The Joker" (Newley, Bricusse) - 2:40
8. "Sew the Buttons On" (John Jennings) - 2:06
9. "Sunrise, Sunset" (Jerry Bock, Sheldon Harnick) - 2:25
10. "Why Did I Choose You?" (Herbert Martin, Michael Leonard) - 2:04
11. "Xanadu" (Gérard Calvi, Harold Rome) - 1:43
12. "Something's Coming" (Leonard Bernstein, Stephen Sondheim) - 2:07

== Personnel ==
- J. J. Johnson - trombone
- Burt Collins, Joe Newman, Ernie Royal - trumpet
- Wayne Andre, Dick Hixon - trombone
- Tony Studd - bass trombone
- James Buffington, Bob Northern - French horn
- Danny Bank, Phil Bodner, Jerome Richardson, Frank Wess - reeds
- Everett Barksdale, Kenny Burrell, Carl Lynch - guitar
- Hank Jones - piano
- Richard Davis - bass
- Grady Tate - drums
- Warren Smith, Phil Kraus - percussion
- Mundell Lowe - arranger, conductor
