= Soul Surfin' =

Studio album by Kai Winding
- Released: 1963
- Recorded: May 27, 28 & 31, 1963; New York City
- Genre: Jazz
- Label: Verve; V/V6 8551
- Producer: Creed Taylor

Kai Winding chronology
Solo (1963)	Soul Surfin' (1963)	Kai Winding (1963)

Soul Surfin' is an album by jazz trombonist and arranger Kai Winding featuring guitarist Kenny Burrell recorded in 1963 for the Verve label. The album was reissued as !!!More!!! (Theme from Mondo Cane) following the chart success of the single of the same name.

== Reception ==
Professional ratings
Review scores
Source	Rating
Allmusic	3/5 stars

The Allmusic review by Tony Wilds observed "A strict surf album this is not, despite the packaging and a few titles. More is really the classic, best-selling album launching Kai Winding's mod sound. Actually, it is Claus Ogerman and Winding's sound, helped out in no small part by Kenny Burrell on guitar. Except when obviously imitating standard surf guitar, Burrell provides texture, specifically the "water sound" popularized by Vinnie Bell. Within this warm bath, as it were, the piercing electronic ondioline shimmers icily. The rhythm is basic "big beat" rock, and melody never really has a chance to escape blues figures, which is just as well".

== Track listing ==
1. "More (Theme from Mondo Cane)" (Riz Ortolani, Nino Oliviero) - 2:00
2. "Hero" (Claus Ogerman) - 2:16
3. "Gravy Waltz" (Steve Allen, Ray Brown) - 1:42
4. "China Nights (Shina No Yoru)" (Nobuyuki Takeoka, Yaso Saijo) - 1:50
5. "Surf Bird" (Ogerman) - 2:21
6. "Pipeline" (Brian Carman, Bob Spickard) - 2:19
7. "Sukiyaki" (Hachidai Nakamura, Rokusuke Ei) - 2:25
8. "Soul Surfin'" (Kai Winding) - 3:50
9. "Tube Wail" (Winding) - 2:50
10. "Spinner" (Ogerman, Doris Tauber) - 2:05
11. "Hearse Ride" (Winding) - 2:25
12. "Comin' Home Baby" (Ben Tucker, Bob Dorough) - 2:10

== Personnel ==
- Kai Winding - trombone, arranger
- Kenny Burrell - guitar
- Paul Griffin - electric piano
- Jean-Jacques Perrey - ondioline
- Unidentified band
- Claus Ogerman - arranger (tracks 1, 2, 4, 5, 9 & 10)
