= Everett Barksdale =

American jazz guitarist

- Born: April 28, 1910; Detroit, Michigan, U.S.
- Died: January 29 1986 (aged 75) Inglewood, California
- Genres: Jazz
- Occupation: Musician
- Instrument: Guitar
- Years active: 1930s–1970s

Everett Barksdale (April 28, 1910 – January 29, 1986) was an American jazz guitarist and session musician.

== Biography ==
Barksdale born in Detroit, Michigan, originally played bass and banjo before settling on guitar. In the 1930s, he moved to Chicago, where he was in Erskine Tate's band. He recorded for the first time with violinist Eddie South in 1931, and remained with South until 1939. He moved to New York City and became a member of the Benny Carter big band. Around the same time, he recorded with Sidney Bechet. During the 1940s, he worked for CBS as a session musician.

As a sideman, Barksdale played guitar in many genres. He worked with vocalists Dean Barlow, Maxine Sullivan, the Blenders, and the Clovers. He played on the hit "Love Is Strange" by Mickey & Sylvia, and was music director for the Ink Spots.

Beginning in 1949, he worked with pianist Art Tatum until Tatum died in 1956. During the 1950s and 1960s, he was a member of the house band at ABC.

He played on recordings by Lena Horne, Sammy Davis Jr., Dinah Washington, and Sarah Vaughan. Among his other jazz associations were Milt Hinton, Buddy Tate, Clark Terry, and Louis Armstrong. He also played guitar in the studio for pop and soul musicians such as The Drifters (including on "Under the Boardwalk" and "Saturday Night at the Movies") and Ben E. King.

Barksdale retired from active performance in the 1970s and moved to California. He died in Inglewood, California, in 1986.

== Discography ==
=== As sideman ===
- Red Allen, Ride, Red, Ride in Hi-Fi (RCA Victor, 1957)
- Louis Armstrong, Louis and the Angels (Decca, 1957)
- Louis Armstrong, Louis and the Good Book (Brunswick, 1958)
- Chet Baker, Baker's Holiday (Limelight, 1965)
- Lavern Baker, See See Rider (Atlantic, 1963)
- George Barnes, Guitar Galaxies (Mercury, 1962)
- Sidney Bechet, Walkin' and Talkin' to Myself (Jazztone, 1956)
- Vinnie Bell, Big Sixteen Guitar Favorites (Musicor, 1965)
- Nappy Brown, Don't Be Angry! (Savoy, 1984)
- Oscar Brown, Sin & Soul (Columbia, 1960)
- Milt Buckner, Rockin' Hammond (Capitol, 1956)
- Solomon Burke, If You Need Me (Atlantic, 1963)
- Billy Butler, Yesterday, Today & Tomorrow (Prestige, 1970)
- Al Caiola, Italian Guitars (Time, 1960)
- Cab Calloway, Hi De Hi De Ho (RCA, 1982)
- Nat King Cole, The Nat King Cole Story (Capitol, 1961)
- Chris Connor, Sings Lullabys of Birdland (Bethlehem, 1954)
- Sam Cooke, Swing Low (RCA Victor, 1961)
- Sam Cooke, My Kind of Blues (RCA Victor, 1961)
- King Curtis, Sweet Soul (Atco, 1968)
- Bill Danoff, Reincarnation (ABC, 1969)
- Vic Dickenson & Joe Thomas, Mainstream (Atlantic, 1958)
- Ella Fitzgerald and Louis Armstrong, Dream a Little Dream of Me (1950)
- Lotti Golden, Motor-Cycle (Atlantic, 1969)
- Cyril Haynes, The Spider Plays (Golden Crest, 1958)
- Johnny Hodges, Don't Sleep in the Subway (Verve, 1967)
- Dick Hyman, Keyboard Kaleidoscope (Command, 1964)
- Budd Johnson, French Cookin' (Argo, 1963)
- J. J. Johnson, Broadway Express (RCA Victor, 1965)
- Herbie Mann and Tamiko Jones, A Mann & A Woman (Atlantic, 1966)
- Jimmy McGriff, Cherry (Solid State, 1966)
- Jimmy McGriff, Groove Grease (Groove Merchant, 1971)
- Big Miller, Did You Ever Hear the Blues? (United Artists, 1959)
- Hugo Montenegro, Boogie Woogie + Bongos (Time, 1962)
- Esther Phillips, Esther Phillips Sings (Atlantic, 1966)
- Jimmy Scott, Little Jimmy Scott (Savoy, 1984)
- Neil Sedaka, Rock with Sedaka (RCA Victor, 1959)
- Nina Simone, Nina Simone Sings the Blues (RCA Victor, 1967)
- Nina Simone, To Love Somebody (RCA Victor, 1969)
- Rex Stewart, Rendezvous with Rex (Felsted, 1958)
- Buddy Tate, Swinging Like Tate (Felsted, 1958)
- Art Tatum, The Art Tatum Trio (Capitol, 1953)
- Art Tatum, Art Tatum (Capitol, 1956)
- Clark Terry, Chico O'Farrill, Spanish Rice (Impulse!, 1966)
- Harold Vick, The Caribbean Suite (RCA Victor, 1967)
- Harold Vick, Straight Up (RCA Victor, 1967)
- Dicky Wells, Bones for the King (Felsted, 1958)
- Dicky Wells, Trombone Four-in-Hand (Felsted, 1959)
- Kai Winding, Rainy Day (Verve, 1965)
- Kai Winding, The In Instrumentals (Verve, 1965)
