= The Incredible Kai Winding Trombones =

Studio album by Kai Winding
- Released: 1960
- Recorded: November 17, 21 & 23 and December 13, 1960
- Genre: Jazz
- Length: 37:51
- Label: Impulse!
- Producer: Creed Taylor

Kai Winding chronology
The Great Kai & J. J. (1960)	The Incredible Kai Winding Trombones (1960)	Kai Olé (1961)

The Incredible Kai Winding Trombones is an album by American jazz trombonist Kai Winding featuring performances recorded in 1960 for the Impulse! label.

== Reception ==
The Allmusic review by Scott Yanow awarded the album 4 stars calling it "Fine straight-ahead music obviously most enjoyed by listeners who like the sound of trombones".

Professional ratings
Review scores
Source	Rating
Allmusic	4/5 stars

== Track listing ==
1. "Speak Low" (Ogden Nash, Kurt Weill) — 4:08
2. "Lil Darlin'" (Neal Hefti) — 4:07
3. "Doodlin'" (Horace Silver) — 3:36
4. "Love Walked In" (George Gershwin, Ira Gershwin) — 2:56
5. "Mangos" (Dee Libby, Sid Wayne) — 3:46
6. "Impulse" (Kai Winding) — 3:14
7. "Black Coffee" (Sonny Burke, Paul Francis Webster) — 4:09
8. "Bye Bye Blackbird" (Mort Dixon, Ray Henderson) — 4:02
9. "Michie" (Slow) (Winding) — 3:05
10. "Michie" (Fast) (Winding) — 3:48

- Recorded at Rudy Van Gelder Studio in Englewood Cliffs, New Jersey on November 17, 1960 (tracks 6 & 9), November 21, 1960 (tracks 1, 4 & 5), November 23, 1960 (tracks 2 & 3) and December 13, 1960 (tracks 7, 8 & 10)

== Personnel ==
- Kai Winding — trombone
- Jimmy Knepper (tracks 7, 8 & 10), Johnny Messner (tracks 1–5), Ephie Resnick (tracks 6 & 9) — trombone
- Paul Faulise, Dick Lieb (tracks 7, 8 & 10), Tony Studd (tracks 1–6 & 9) — bass trombone
- Bill Evans (tracks 7, 8 & 10), Ross Tompkins (tracks 1–6 & 9) — piano
- Ray Starling (tracks 1 & 2) — mellophone
- Bob Cranshaw (tracks 1–6 & 9), Ron Carter (tracks 7, 8 & 10) — bass
- Al Beldini (tracks 1–6 & 9), Sticks Evans (tracks 7, 8 & 10) — drums
- Olatunji — congas (tracks 1 & 5)
