= Alan Raph =

- Born: July 3, 1933; New York City, New York, U.S.
- Died: December 8, 2023 (aged 90) Danbury, Connecticut, U.S.
- Genres: Jazz, classical, commercial
- Occupations: Musician, composer, arranger, conductor
- Instruments: Trombone, tuba, keyboard
- Years active: 1955–2023

Alan Raph (July 3, 1933 – December 8, 2023) was an American bass trombonist, composer, arranger, and conductor who founded and conducted the Danbury Brass Band. He recorded with many well-known musicians including Quincy Jones, Philip Glass, Peter Nero, John Pizzarelli and Bob Brookmeyer for television, movies, and ballet. He was for many years on first call with most New York City recording studios.

== Background ==
Alan Raph was born in New York City to Marion McGuire and Ted Raph. His maternal grandparents were Irish. His grandfather Mathew A. McGuire was born in Ballyhaunis, Mayo, Ireland. His paternal grandparents were born in Russia and emigrated to the United States in 1893. His paternal grandfather Nachman Raffiewitz (anglicized as Nathan Raph) was Jewish, from near Nezhin, Ukraine, Russia. His father Ted was a jazz trombonist in the 1920s and 1930s. Raph married Theresa Capp on October 5, 1957. and had two children. In 1978 he married musician Mary Ann O'Connor and had a child.

Raph died in a traffic incident on December 8, 2023, at the age of 90.

== Education ==
Raph graduated from New York University with a Bachelor of Science degree in Music Education. He then studied at Teachers College Columbia University where he received a Masters of Arts degree. He has studied privately with Nadia Boulanger, John Mehegan, Simon Karasick, and Gabriel Masson.

== Professional career ==
Raph was a professor at the Teachers College of Columbia University in New York City, as well as instructor and associate professor at Queens College of the City University of New York. He got his start in the 1955 when he was hired by Les Elgart, whose orchestra played dance band music.

Raph was a charter member of the American Symphony Orchestra for which he played the bass trombone. He was for many years the bass trombone and tuba player on first call with most New York City recording studios. He was the editor of the Arban Method for Trombone, originally written by Charles Randall and Simone Mantia, and re-published in 2013. He performed under the direction of Leopold Stokowski with the Gerry Mulligan Concert Jazz Band and the Chamber Brass Players. As a freelance trombonist, Raph recorded albums with artists including Quincy Jones, Don Sebesky, Philip Glass, the NBC Opera Company, Eugene Ormandy, Paul Whiteman and his Palais Royale Orchestra, the Ballet Bolshoi Theatre, Diana Ross, Lena Horne and Mel Torme. He toured with Frankie Avalon to Bermuda.

Raph also recorded music for many movies and television shows including Sesame Street, The Cosby Show, Name That Tune, The Godfather, The Producers, Midnight Cowboy, Hamburger Hill, Bananas, Kundun, Fog of War, Secret Window, and Taking Lives. He founded the Danbury Brass Band in 1983. The ensemble is composed of trumpets, cornets, French horns, trombones, euphoniums, and tubas. He composed and arranged many pieces for the band and continued as its music director and conductor until his death. The band has performed abroad in Australia, Bermuda, Ireland, Australia and New Zealand.

Raph composed for the Joffrey Ballet Company. He also arranged several songs for the Broadway musical Rockabye Hamlet (1976). He was a member of ASCAP.

Raph was known for his low range playing. He was awarded the Most Valuable Player award by the National Academy of Recording Arts and Sciences.

== Compositions ==
=== Works for wind band ===
- Variations on a Theme by Handel, for trombone and band
- Fantasy on a Theme by Purcell, for flute and band

=== Ballets ===
- Trinity, premiered in 1970 by the Joffrey Ballet Company
- Sacred Grove on Mt. Tamalpais, premiered in 1971 by the Joffrey Ballet Company

=== Chamber music ===
- Burlesque, for trombone ensemble (ca. 1956, per the composer)

=== Pedagogical works ===
- Bel Canto Vocalises for Bass Trombone
- Beyond Boundaries
- Diversified Trombone Etudes
- Arban Trombone
- Melodious Etudes
- Recital Pieces for Unaccompanied Trombone
- The Double Valve Bass Trombone
- Trombonisms

== Media ==
- Alan Raph: trombone tips - warmups
- Alan Raph: trombone tips - high notes
- Alan Raph: trombone tips - Bumble Bee
- Alan Raph: trombone tips - very low notes
- Alan Raph: trombone tips - The Bartok glissando
- Alan Raph: trombone tips - staccato & legato
- Alan Raph: trombone tips - double (& triple) tonguing
- Alan Raph: trombone tips - Reading jazz notation

== Publications ==
- Dance Band Reading and Interpretation, Alfred Music Publishers, 2002. 44 p., ISBN 978-0-757-92625-9
- "Le" Trombone, AR Publishing Co., 1983. ISBN 978-0-9705815-0-1
- Trombonisms, Carl Fischer, Inc., 1983. ISBN 978-0825803420
- "Les" Brass, AR Publishing Co., 1984. ISBN 978-0970581518
- "L" Orchestra, AR Publishing Co., 1986. ISBN 978-0970581525

== Discography ==
With J. J. Johnson

- Goodies (RCA Victor, 1965)

With Lee Konitz

- Chicago 'n All That Jazz (Groove Merchant, 1975)

With Gerry Mulligan

- Walk on the Water (DRG, 1980)
- The Concert Jazz Band

With Jerome Richardson

- Groove Merchant (Verve, 1968)

== Bibliography ==
- Michael Cuscuna, Michel Ruppli: The Blue Note label : a discography, Revised and expanded edition, Westport, Connecticut: Greenwood Press, 2001, 913 p.
- de:Wolfgang Suppan, de:Armin Suppan: Das Neue Lexikon des Blasmusikwesens, 4. Auflage, Freiburg-Tiengen, Blasmusikverlag Schulz GmbH, 1994, ISBN 3-923058-07-1
- Michel Ruppli, Ed Novitsky: The Mercury labels : a discography, Vol. V: record and artist indexes, Westport, Connecticut: Greenwood Press, 1993, 882 p.
- E. Ruth Anderson: Contemporary American composers - A biographical dictionary, Second edition, Boston: G. K. Hall, 1982, 578 p., ISBN 978-0-816-18223-7
- Jaques Cattell Press: ASCAP biographical dictionary of composers, authors and publishers, Fourth edition, New York: R. R. Bowker, 1980, 589 p., ISBN 0-835212-83-1
