= Bill Watrous =

American jazz trombonist (1939–2018)

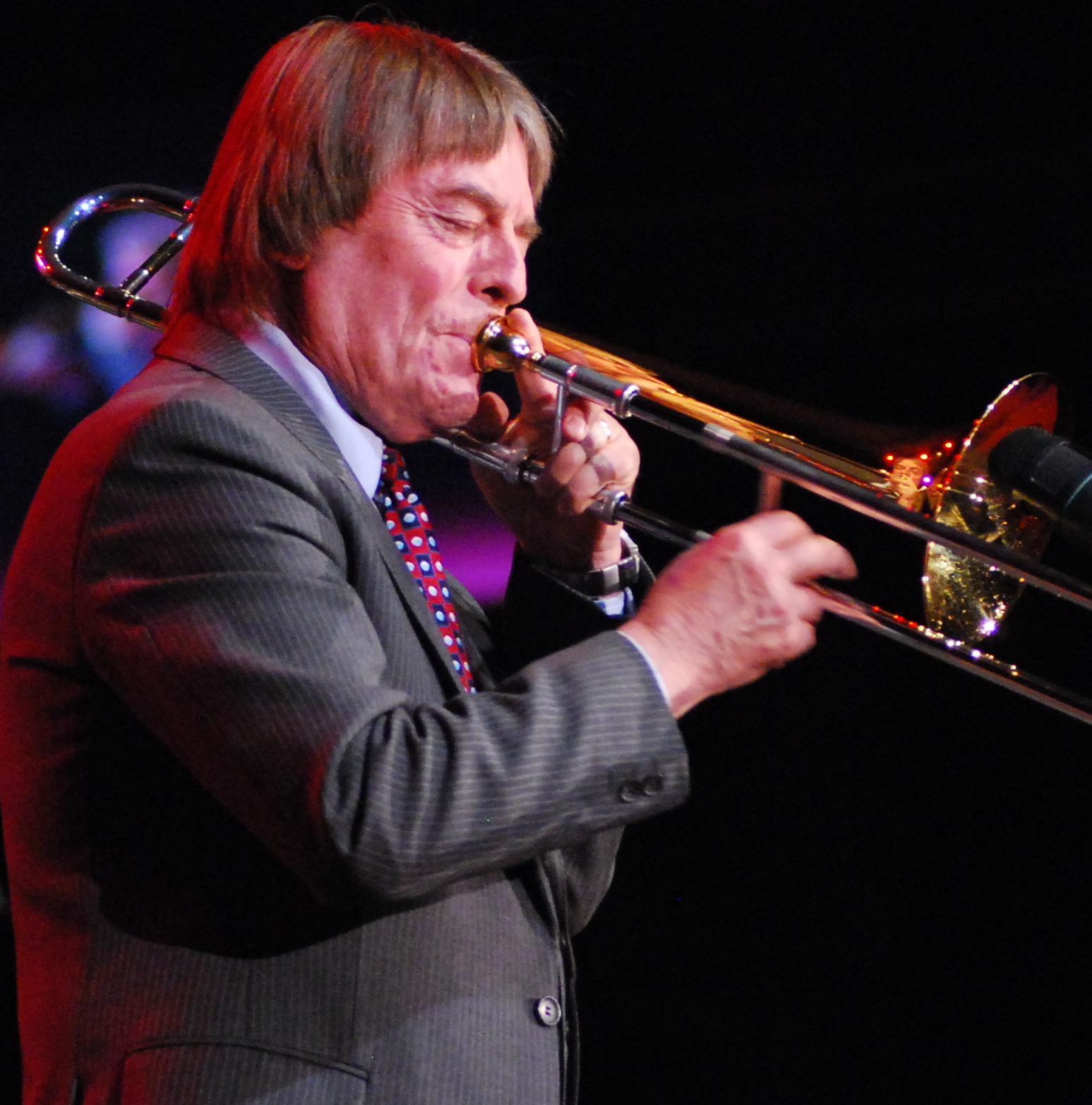

Background information
- Born: William Russell Watrous III; June 8, 1939; Middletown, Connecticut, U.S.
- Died: July 2, 2018 (aged 79) Los Angeles, California, U.S.
- Genres: Jazz
- Occupations: Musician
- Instruments: Trombone

William Russell Watrous III (June 8, 1939 – July 2, 2018) was an American jazz trombonist. He is perhaps best known for his rendition of Sammy Nestico's arrangement of the Johnny Mandel ballad "A Time for Love", which he recorded on a 1993 album of the same name. A self-described "bop-oriented" player, he was well known among trombonists as a master technician and for his mellifluous sound.

== Biography ==
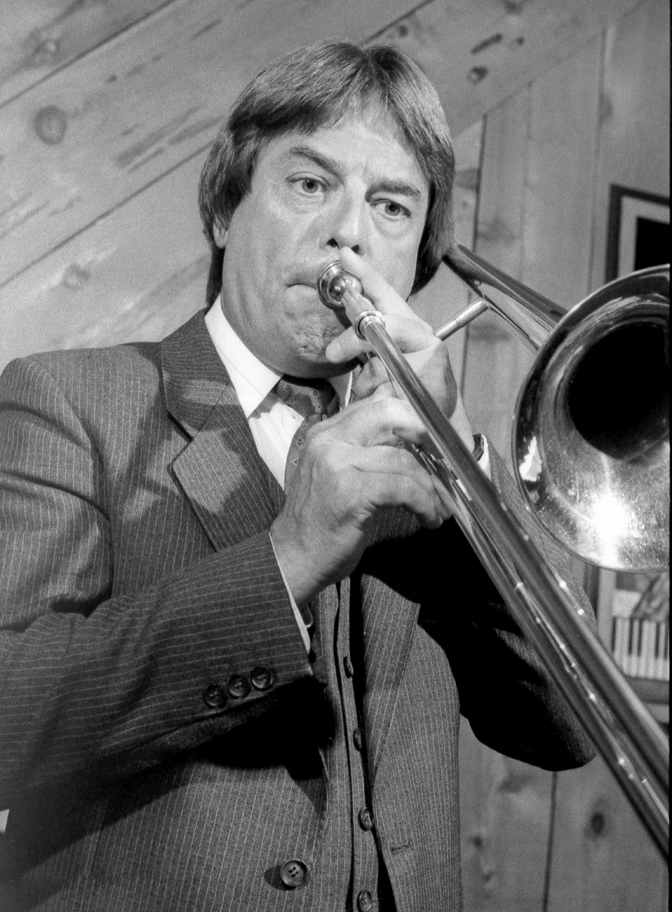
Bill Watrous at Bach Dancing & Dynamite Society, Half Moon Bay, California, July 12, 1989

He was born in Middletown, Connecticut, United States. Watrous' father, also a trombonist, introduced him to the instrument at an early age. While serving in the U.S. Navy, Watrous studied with jazz pianist and composer Herbie Nichols. His first professional performances were in Billy Butterfield's band.

Watrous' career blossomed in the 1960s. He played and recorded with many prominent jazz musicians, including Count Basie, Maynard Ferguson, Woody Herman, Quincy Jones, Johnny Richards, and trombonist Kai Winding. He also played with Frank Sinatra, Ray Charles, Ella Fitzgerald, and Sarah Vaughan. He played in the Merv Griffin Show house band during 1965–1968 and worked as a staff musician for CBS during 1967–1969.

In 1971, he played with the jazz fusion group Ten Wheel Drive. Also in the 1970s, Watrous formed his own band, The Manhattan Wildlife Refuge Big Band, which recorded two albums for Columbia Records. The band was later renamed Refuge West when Watrous moved to southern California. In July 1973, he attended the US tour of French zeuhl band Magma.

He continued to work as a bandleader, studio musician, and performer at jazz clubs. In 1983, Watrous collaborated with Alan Raph to publish Trombonisms, an instructional manual covering performance techniques for trombone. He has recorded as a solo artist, bandleader, and in small ensembles. These recordings include a Japanese import album in 2001 containing material recorded in 1984 with Carl Fontana, whom Watrous has cited as his favorite trombonist. He traveled periodically to San Diego to play with his good friend and former student, Dave Scott, a noted jazz musician himself and TV broadcast host. The annual SHSU (Sam Houston State University) Bill Watrous Jazz Festival in Huntsville, Texas is named in his honor and claims to be Texas' oldest jazz festival.

Watrous taught for two decades at the University of Southern California in Los Angeles, before retiring in 2015. He died in Los Angeles on July 2, 2018. He was survived by his wife, Maryann; their son, Jason; and two daughters from a previous marriage – Melody Watrous Ide and Cheryl Schoolcraft.

=== Other talents ===
In his teens, Watrous played baseball and was scouted by the New York Yankees. In the early 1980s, Watrous considered joining a minor league baseball team.

== Awards and nominations ==
- 1975, Grammy Nomination for The Tiger of San Pedro
- 2019, Legacy Circle Award of The International Trombone Association
- Two Down Beat Awards and nominated top trombonist by DownBeat seven years in a row

== Discography ==
=== As leader ===
- In Love Again (as William Russell Watrous with the Richard Behrke Strings) (MTA, 1964)
- Plays Love Themes for the Underground, the Establishment & Other Sub Cultures Not Yet Known (With the Walter Raim Concept) (MTA, 1969)
- Bone Straight Ahead (Famous Door, 1973)
- Manhattan Wildlife Refuge (Columbia, 1974)
- The Tiger of San Pedro (Columbia, 1975)
- Funk 'n' Fun (Yupiteru, 1979)
- Watrous in Hollywood (Famous Door, 1979)
- Coronary Trombossa! (Famous Door, 1980)
- I'll Play for You (Famous Door, 1980)
- La Zorra (Famous Door, 1980)
- Bill Watrous in London (Mole Jazz, 1982)
- Roaring Back to New York, New York (Famous Door, 1983)
- Bill Watrous and Carl Fontana (Atlas, 1984)
- Someplace Else (Soundwings, 1986)
- Reflections (Soundwings, 1987)
- Bone-Ified (GNP Crescendo, 1992)
- Time for Love (GNP Crescendo, 1993)
- Space Available (Double-Time, 1997)
- Live at the Blue Note (Half Note, 2000)
- Living in the Moment with The Gary Urwin Jazz Orchestra (Sea Breeze, 2003)
- Live in Living Comfort (Stonequake, 2003)
- Mad to the Bone with The Rob Stoneback Big Band (Stonequake, 2003)
- Kindred Spirits with The Gary Urwin Jazz Orchestra (Summit, 2006)

=== As sideman ===
With Deodato

- Prelude (CTI, 1973)

With Kenny Burrell

- Blues - The Common Ground (Verve, 1968)

With Paul Desmond

- Summertime (A&M/CTI, 1968)

With Maynard Ferguson

- The Blues Roar (Mainstream, 1965)

With The Gene Harris All Star Big Band

- Tribute to Count Basie (Concord Jazz, 1988)

With Quincy Jones

- Golden Boy (Mercury, 1964)
- Roots (A&M, 1977)

With O'Donel Levy

- Dawn of a New Day (Groove Merchant, 1973)
- Simba (Groove Merchant, 1974)

With Milton Nascimento

- Courage (A&M/CTI, 1969)

With Jimmy Witherspoon

- Blues for Easy Livers (Prestige, 1965)

With Johnny Richards

- Aqui Se Habla Español (Roulette, 1967)

With Red Rodney

- The Red Tornado (Muse, 1975)

With Arturo Sandoval

- Dream Come True (1993)

With Kai Winding

- Modern Country (Verve, 1964)
- The In Instrumentals (Verve, 1965)
- More Brass (Verve, 1966)
- Dirty Dog (Verve, 1966)
- Penny Lane & Time (Verve, 1967)
- Trombone Summit (MPS,1980)

With Pennsbury Concert Jazz Band

- Then & Now (2013)

With Ingrid James and San Gabriel 7 (JGS-SG7, 2012)
