= More (Theme from Mondo Cane) =

Pop song adapted from a film

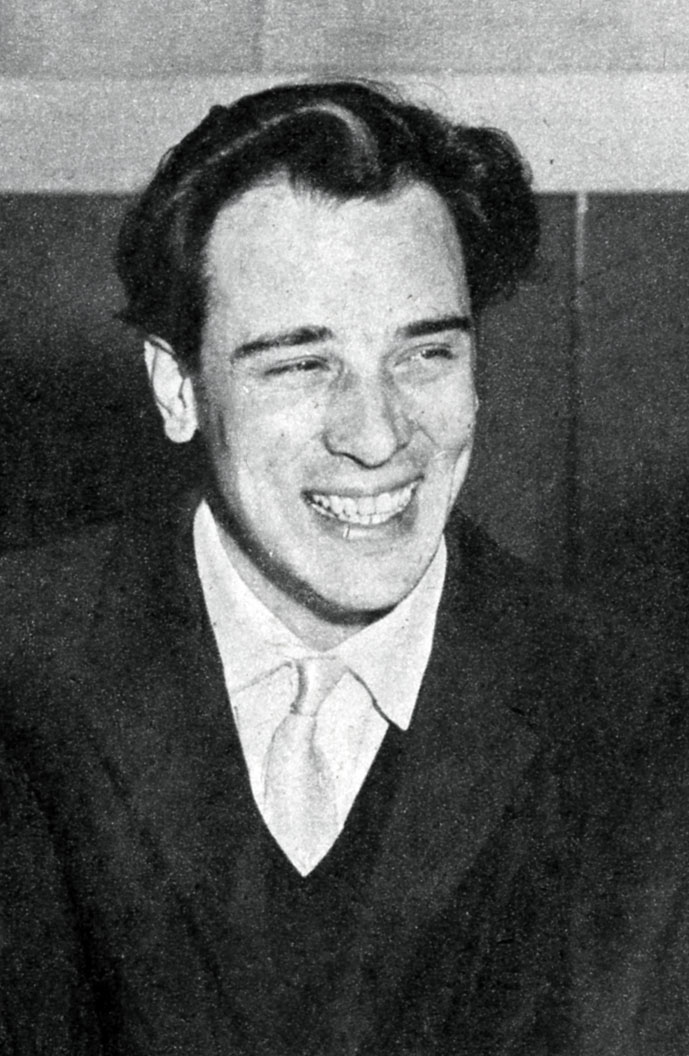
"More" was composed by Riz Ortolani (pictured) and Nino Oliviero.

"Ti Guarderò Nel Cuore" ("I will look into your heart"), later released under the international title "More", is a love song adapted from a film score written by Riz Ortolani and Nino Oliviero for the 1962 Italian documentary film Mondo Cane. Ortolani and Oliviero originally composed the melody as an orchestral arrangement that served as the film's theme music. Italian lyrics were provided by Marcello Ciorciolini, and were adapted into English by Norman Newell. It has since become an easy listening and pop standard.

The film Mondo Cane is a documentary, and uses a variety of music to accompany various segments. Some melodies are used repeatedly, in different styles, each named for the part of the movie where the music is used. Of the 15 music tracks on the soundtrack album, one melody is presented 6 times, another melody 2 times. The melody which became known as "More" is presented 4 times, named "Life Savers Girls", "The Last Flight/L'Ultimo Volo", "Models In Blue/Modelle in Blu", "Repabhan Street/Repabhan Strasse", in styles ranging from lush to march and 3/4 waltz.

"More" is one of Ortolani's acclaimed and influential works. It won the 1964 Grammy Award for Best Instrumental Theme. It was nominated for the Academy Award for Best Original Song at the 36th Academy Awards in 1964, where it was performed in English by Katyna Ranieri. The nomination led Ruggero Deodato to hire Ortolani to compose the score for his film Cannibal Holocaust.

== Selective list of recorded versions ==
=== Katyna Ranieri ===
Ortolani's wife and frequent collaborator Katyna Ranieri recorded “'Ti Guarderò Nel Cuore” with Italian lyrics in 1962, with an orchestra conducted by the composer Ortolani, who was also her husband. It was issued as a 45 rpm single by MGM. Ranieri sang “More” live in English at the 36th Academy Awards in 1964, where the song was nominated for an Oscar.

=== Kai Winding version ===
"More" first caught U.S. attention as a pop instrumental hit by jazz trombone player Kai Winding that was arranged and conducted by Claus Ogerman, released as a single on Verve 10295. Popular in the summer and autumn of 1963, the record peaked at #2 on the Easy Listening chart and at #8 and lasted 15 weeks on the Billboard Hot 100. Rather than employing a traditional jazz instrument, the recording's melody was instead performed on the electronic Ondioline by Jean-Jacques Perrey. Verve retitled the parent album Soul Surfin' containing "More" and other songs performed by Winding's big band !!!!More!!! (Theme from Mondo Cane) to capitalise on the single's popularity. While Winding's brassy performances feature top jazz players, notably Kenny Burrell on guitar, the arrangements are in so-called "surf music" style.

After Winding's recording became popular, United Artists added to the soundtrack cover a starburst stating "INCLUDED IN THIS ALBUM THE HIT SONG "MORE"".

"More (Theme from Mondo Cane)"

Single by Kai Winding
- B-side: "Comin' Home Baby"
- Released: June 1963
- Recorded: 1963
- Genre: Easy listening
- Length: 2:00
- Label: Verve
- Songwriters: Riz Ortolani and Nino Oliviero
- Producer: Creed Taylor

=== Vic Dana version ===
A vocal version of "More" by Vic Dana stalled at #42 in early October 1963, two weeks before Winding's rendition dropped off the Billboard chart. But the song did much better over the years, recorded hundreds of times by many artists, ranging from Frank Sinatra to the Baja Marimba Band. It is now considered a pop standard.

=== Martin Denny Version ===
The Versatile Martin Denny -LP- (1963) LRP-3307/LST-7307

=== Carol Williams version ===
A 1976 cover by Carol Williams on the Salsoul label was popular when disco was breaking into the mainstream and is seen as an early disco classic. “More” was the first 12-inch commercial single that one could buy in stores all over the world. It made #4 on the Disco Singles, #8 on the Dance Music/Club Play Singles and #98 on the R&B Singles.

=== Bobby Darin version ===
American singer Bobby Darin recorded a version of the song included on his 1964 studio album From Hello Dolly to Goodbye Charlie. Darin’s version of the song appeared on an episode of the second season from HBO hit series Euphoria. It was also featured in Mariska Hargitay's 2025 HBO documentary "My Mom Jayne", about the life of her mother Jayne Mansfield. The song accompanied a montage of film footage and pictures from her mother's early relationship with, and then wedding, to Mickey Hargitay.

=== The Ventures version ===
American instrumental group The Ventures recorded a version of the song in 1963.
