= Nino Oliviero =

Italian film composer (1918–1980)

- Born: 13 February 1918; Naples, Italy
- Died: 29 February 1980 (aged 62) Rome, Italy
- Genres: Film score
- Occupation: Composer

Nino Oliviero (13 February 1918 – 29 February 1980) was an Italian composer.

Born in Naples, Oliviero began his career as composer after the Second World War, composing a series of successful Neapolitan melodies such as "'Nu quarto 'e luna" and "'O ciucciariello". From Sixties he worked as musical editor of various newspapers and signed the soundtracks of a number of films, including Mondo Cane (1962), of which the theme song, "More", co-written with Riziero "Riz" Ortolani, was nominated for the Academy Award for Best Original Song at the 36th Academy Awards and became an international hit. He also scored the 1976 Vincente Minnelli musical A Matter of Time, which starred Liza Minnelli and Ingrid Bergman. Oliviero died in Rome, at 62, after a long illness.

== Selected filmography ==
- Passionate Song (1953)
- The Daughter of the Regiment (1953)
- Men and Noblemen (1959)
- Run for Your Wife (1965)
- Savage Gringo (1966)
- A Matter of Time (1976)
