= Kai Winding =

Danish-American jazz composer and trombonist (1922–1983)

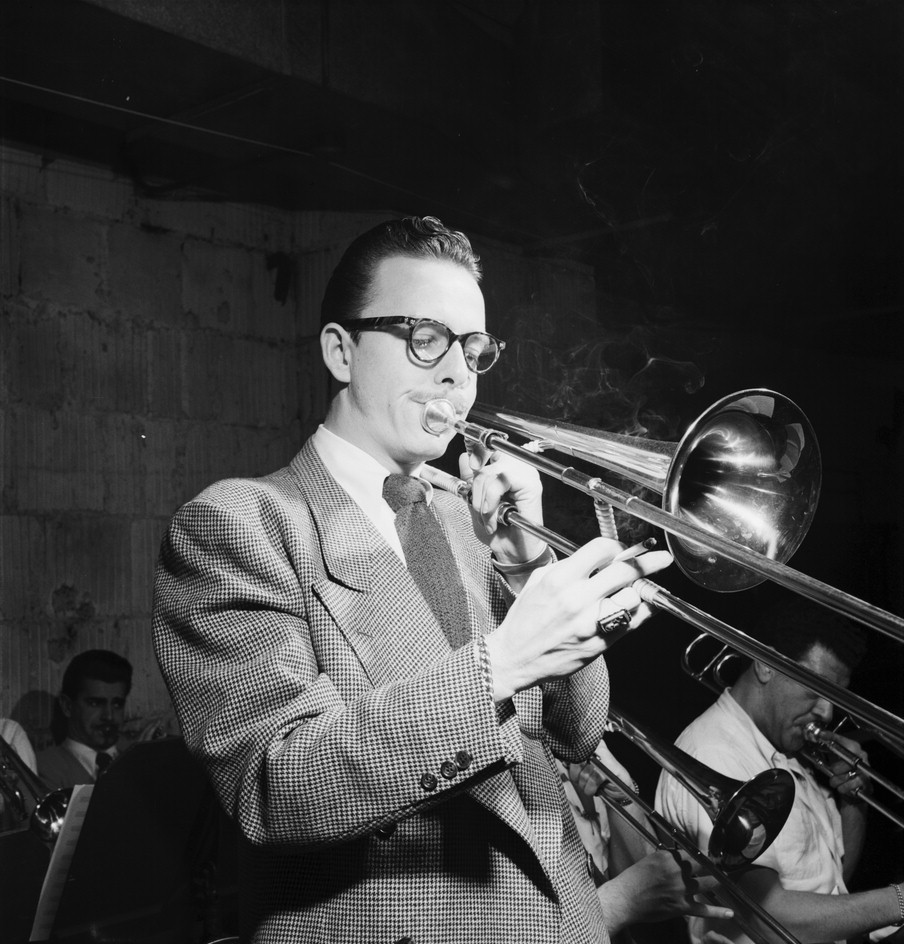
- Winding in New York, c. January 1947

Background information
- Born: Kai Chresten Winding; May 18, 1922; Aarhus, Denmark
- Died: May 6, 1983 (aged 60) Yonkers, New York, U.S.
- Genres: Jazz
- Occupations: Musician, composer
- Instrument: Trombone
- Years active: 1940–1983

Kai Chresten Winding (/ˈkaɪ ˈwɪndɪŋ/ KY WIN-ding; (Note: "'my name is pronounced Kai as in fly, Winding as in woodwind,' he told Crescendo International, though not unreasonably many people mispronounced Kai to rhyme with Jay" (i.e., /ˈkeɪ/, presumably because Winding's partnership with J. J. Johnson led the pair to be nicknamed "Jay and Kai" in the titles of multiple albums).) May 18, 1922 – May 6, 1983) was a Danish born American trombonist and jazz composer. He is known for his collaborations with fellow trombonist J. J. Johnson. His version of "More", the theme from the movie Mondo Cane, reached number eight on the Billboard Hot 100 in 1963 and remained his only entry there.

== Biography ==
Winding was born in Aarhus, Denmark. His father, Ove Winding, was a naturalized U.S. citizen, thus Kai, his mother, and sisters, though born abroad were already U.S. citizens. In September 1934, his mother, Jenny Winding, moved Kai and his two sisters, Ann and Alice. Kai graduated in 1940 from Stuyvesant High School in New York City and that same year began his career as a professional trombonist with Shorty Allen's band. Subsequently, he played with Sonny Dunham and Alvino Rey, until he entered the United States Coast Guard during World War II.

After the war, Winding was a member of Benny Goodman's orchestra, then Stan Kenton's. He participated in Birth of the Cool sessions in 1949, appearing on four of the twelve tracks, while J. J. Johnson appeared on the other eight, having participated on the other two sessions.

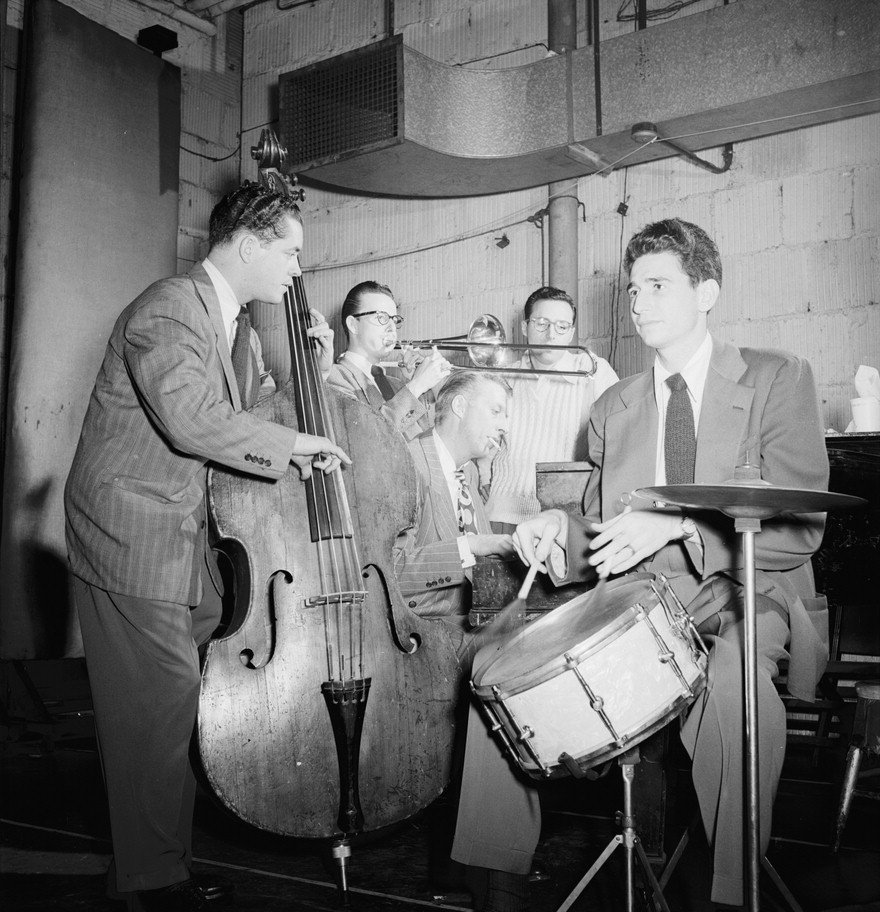
From left: Eddie Safranski, Winding, Stan Kenton, Pete Rugolo, and Shelly Manne, c. January 1946. Photograph by William P. Gottlieb.

In 1954, at the urging of producer Ozzie Cadena, Winding began a long association with Johnson, recording trombone duets for Savoy Records, then Columbia. He experimented with instruments in brass ensembles. The album Jay & Kai + 6 (1956) featured a trombone octet and the trombonium. He composed and arranged many of the works he and Johnson recorded.

During the 1960s, Winding began an association with Verve Records and producer Creed Taylor. He released the first version of "Time Is on My Side" in 1963 before it was recorded by Irma Thomas and The Rolling Stones. His best selling recording from this period is "More", the theme from the movie Mondo Cane, which reached number eight in the Billboard Hot 100 and remained his only entry there. Arranged and conducted by Claus Ogerman, "More" featured what is probably the first appearance of the French electronic instrument the ondioline on an American recording. Although Winding was credited with playing the ondioline, guitarist Vinnie Bell, who worked on the session, claimed that it was played by Jean-Jacques Perrey, a pioneer of electronic music. Winding experimented with ensembles again, recorded solo albums, and one album of country music with the Anita Kerr Singers. He followed Creed Taylor to A&M/CTI and made more albums with J. J. Johnson. He was a member of the all-star jazz group The Giants of Jazz in 1971.

His son, Jai Winding, is a keyboardist who has worked as a session musician, writer, and producer in Los Angeles.

Kai Winding was taken to a hospital because of a recurring brain disease that he was informed about while in Yonkers, New York, and later died from complications in May 1983.

== Discography ==
=== As leader/co-leader ===
- Loaded (1945)
- Kai Winding All Stars (Roost, 1949–51 [1952])
- Arrangements by Gerry Mulligan (1951)
- Brass Fever (1956)
- Trombone Panorama (Columbia, 1956)
- The Trombone Sound (Columbia, 1956)
- The Axidentals with the Kai Winding Trombones (ABC-Paramount, 1958)
- The Swingin' States (Columbia, 1958)
- Dance to the City Beat (Columbia, 1959)
- The Incredible Kai Winding Trombones (Impulse!, 1960)
- Kai Olé (Verve, 1961)
- Brand New Swinging Together Again (1961)
- Suspense Themes in Jazz (Verve, 1962)
- The Great Kai Winding Sound (1962)
- Soul Surfin' (Verve, 1963) featuring Kenny Burrell – also released as !!!More!!!
- Solo (Verve, 1963)
- Kai Winding (Verve, 1963)
- That's Where It Is (SESAC, 1963)
- Mondo Cane No. 2 (Verve, 1964)
- Modern Country (Verve, 1965)
- Rainy Day (Verve, 1965)
- The In Instrumentals (Verve, 1965)
- Dirty Dog (Verve, 1966)
- More Brass (Verve, 1966)
- Penny Lane & Time (Verve, 1967)
- Danish Blue (1974)
- Caravan (Glendale, 1977)
- Jazz Showcase (1977)
- Lionel Hampton Presents Kai Winding (1977)
- Duo Bones (Red, 1979) with Dino Piana
- Giant Bones '80 (Sonet, 1980) with Curtis Fuller
- Bone Appétit (Black & Blue, 1980) with Curtis Fuller
- Trombone Summit (MPS, 1981) with Albert Mangelsdorff, Bill Watrous, Jiggs Whigham
- In Cleveland 1957 (1994)

With J. J. Johnson

- The Four Trombones: The Debut Recordings (1953)
- An Afternoon at Birdland (RCA, 1954)
- Dec. 3, 1954 (Prestige, 1954)
- Jay & Kai (Savoy, 1952–54 [1955])
- K + J.J. (Bethlehem, 1955)
- Trombone for Two (Columbia, 1955)
- Trombone by Three (Prestige, 1949 [1956])
- Jay & Kai + 6 (Columbia, 1956)
- Dave Brubeck and Jay & Kai at Newport (Columbia, 1956)
- Jay and Kai (Columbia, 1956)
- The Great Kai & J. J. (Impulse!, 1960)
- Israel (A&M/CTI, 1968)
- Betwixt & Between (A&M/CTI, 1968)
- Stonebone (A&M/CTI [Japan], 1969)

=== As sideman ===
With Ralph Burns and Leonard Feather

- Winter Sequence (MGM, 1954)

With Quincy Jones

- Quincy Jones Plays Hip Hits (Mercury, 1963)
- Quincy Plays for Pussycats (Mercury, 1959–65 [1965])
- Walking in Space (1969)
- I Heard That!! (1976)

With Stan Kenton

- Stan Kenton's Milestones (Capitol, 1943–47 [1950])
- Stan Kenton Classics (Capitol, 1944–47 [1952])
- Artistry in Rhythm (Capitol, 1946)
- Encores (Capitol, 1947)
- The Kenton Era (Capitol, 1940–54, [1955])

With King Pleasure

- 1954: King Pleasure Sings/Annie Ross Sings
- 1954: The Original Moody's Mood
- 1955: King Pleasure

With Pete Rugolo

- Rugolomania (Columbia, 1955)
- New Sounds by Pete Rugolo (Harmony, 1954–55, [1957])

With Zoot Sims

- 1949: The Brothers
- 1952: Zoot Sims All Stars
- 1962: Good Old Zoot

With Sarah Vaughan

- 1955: In the Land of Hi-Fi
- 1957: The George Gershwin Songbook, Vol. 1
- 1958: The Rodgers & Hart Songbook
- 1965: ¡Viva! Vaughan

With others

- 1950: Carnegie Hall X-Mas '49, Charlie Parker
- 1950: Chubby Jackson All Star Big Band, Chubby Jackson
- 1951: The George Wallington Trio, George Wallington
- 1954: Oscar Pettiford Sextet, Oscar Pettiford
- 1955: This Is Chris, Chris Connor
- 1955: Jumping with Ventura, Charlie Ventura
- 1956: Drummer Man, Gene Krupa
- 1957: Chris, Chris Connor
- 1957: Birth of the Cool, Miles Davis
- 1957: The Beat of My Heart, Tony Bennett
- 1959: Plays Gerry Mulligan Arrangements, Gene Krupa
- 1962: I Wanna Be Loved, Dinah Washington
- 1962: Rhythm Is My Business, Ella Fitzgerald
- 1962: Cabin in the Sky, Curtis Fuller
- 1963: Any Number Can Win, Jimmy Smith
- 1963: Broadway, Gerry Mulligan
- 1964: New Fantasy, Lalo Schifrin
- 1965: Jazz Dialogue, Modern Jazz Quartet
- 1965: The Shadow of Your Smile, Astrud Gilberto
- 1967: Prezervation, Stan Getz
- 1968: Summertime, Paul Desmond
- 1969: Chubby Jackson Sextet and Big Band, Chubby Jackson
- 1971: The Giants of Jazz, with Art Blakey, Dizzy Gillespie, Thelonious Monk
- 1972: Strictly Bebop, Dizzy Gillespie
- 1973: The Art of the Modern Jazz Quartet, Modern Jazz Quartet
- 1975: Chase the Clouds Away, Chuck Mangione
- 1977: Featured with the Tadd Dameron Band, Fats Navarro
- 1978: Children of Sanchez, Chuck Mangione
- 1979: Giant Bones '80, Curtis Fuller
- 1979: The New Mel Lewis Quintet Live, Mel Lewis
