= J. J. Johnson discography =

This is a discography of the Jazz trombonist J. J. Johnson (January 22, 1924 – February 4, 2001).

== As leader/co-leader ==
- 1949: J. J. Johnson's Jazz Quintets (Savoy, 1950s)[LP] – J. J. Johnson Savoy singles and EPs from 1946–49
- 1949: Modern Jazz Trombones (Prestige) – B-side of 10 inch album, released 1951. Kai Winding on A-side
- 1949: J. J. Johnson with Sonny Stitt (Prestige) – also issued as part of 1951's, 10 inch Modern Jazz Trombones Volume Two. Also reissued in 1957 as part of Sonny Stitt/Bud Powell/J. J. Johnson
- 1952: Jazz South Pacific (Regent / Savoy)
- 1953: Jay Jay Johnson with Clifford Brown [BLP 5028] (Blue Note) – 10"
- 1953: Jazz Workshop, Volume One: Trombone Rapport with Kai Winding, Bennie Green, Willie Dennis (Debut Records)
- 1953: Jazz Workshop, Volume Two: Trombone Rapport (Debut, 1955) – more recordings from the 1953 Jazz Workshop sessions
- 1953: Four Trombones (Debut) – third release (in 1957) of recordings from the 1953 Jazz Workshop sessions
- 1954: The Eminent Jay Jay Johnson, Vol. 2 [BLP 5057] (Blue Note) – 10"
- 1955: The Eminent Jay Jay Johnson, Vol. 3 [BLP 5070] (Blue Note) – 10"
- 1955: The Eminent Jay Jay Johnson, Vol. 1 [BLP 1505] (Blue Note) – 12"
- 1955: The Eminent Jay Jay Johnson, Vol. 2 [BLP 1506] (Blue Note) – 12"
- 1956: J Is for Jazz (Columbia)
- 1957: First Place (Columbia)
- 1957: Blue Trombone (Columbia)
- 1957: Dial J. J. 5 (Columbia)
- 1957: Stan Getz and J. J. Johnson at the Opera House (Verve)
- 1958: J. J. in Person! (Columbia, 1958)
- 1959: Really Livin' (Columbia, 1959)
- 1960: Trombone and Voices (Columbia, 1960)
- 1960: J.J. Inc. (Columbia, 1961)
- 1961: A Touch of Satin (Columbia, 1962)
- 1961: André Previn and J. J. Johnson with André Previn (Columbia, 1962)
- 1963: J.J.'s Broadway (Verve, 1963)
- 1964: Proof Positive (Impulse!, 1964)
- 1964: J.J.! (RCA Victor, 1965)
- 1965: Goodies (RCA Victor, 1966)
- 1965: Broadway Express (RCA Victor, 1966)
- 1966: The Total J.J. Johnson (RCA Victor, 1967)
- 1977: The Yokohama Concert with Nat Adderley (Pablo, 1978) – live
- 1977: Chain Reaction: Yokohama Concert, Vol. 2 with Nat Adderley (Pablo, 2002)
- 1979: Pinnacles (Milestone, 1980)
- 1980: Concepts in Blue (Pablo, 1981)
- 1982: Aurex Jazz Festival ’82 All Star Jam with Clark Terry, Kai Winding, Dexter Gordon, et al. (East Worl, 1982) – live
- 1983: Jackson, Johnson, Brown and Company with Milt Jackson, Ray Brown, et al. (Fantasy, 1983)
- 1984: We'll Be Together Again with Joe Pass (Pablo, 1984)
- 1984: Things Are Getting Better All the Time with Al Grey (Pablo, 1984)
- 1988: Quintergy (Antilles, 1991) – live
- 1988: Standards (Antilles, 1991) – live
- 1992?: Vivian (Concord, 1992)
- 1992: Let's Hang Out (Verve, 1993)
- 1994: Tangence with the Robert Farnon Orchestra (Verve, 1995)
- 1996: The Brass Orchestra (Verve, 1997)
- 1996: Heroes (Verve, 1998)

=== As co-leader with Kai Winding ===
- 1954: Jay & Kai (Savoy, 1954)[10"]
- 1954: An Afternoon at Birdland ("X", 1955)
- 1954: Jay and Kai – Dec. 3, 1954 (Prestige, 1955)[10"]
- 1955: K + J.J. (Bethlehem, 1955) – reissued as Nuf Said (1959), The Finest of K & J.J. (1976) and Kai & Jay! (Affinity, 1986)
- 1955: Trombone for Two (Columbia, 1956)
- 1956: Jay and Kai + 6, The Jay and Kai Trombone Octet (Columbia, 1956)
- 1956: Dave Brubeck and Jay & Kai at Newport (Columbia, 1956) – live. Johnson on the last three tracks only.
- 1955–57: Jay and Kai (Columbia, 1957)[10"]
- 1960: The Great Kai & J. J. (Impulse!, 1960)
- 1968: Israel (A&M/CTI, 1968)
- 1968–69: Betwixt & Between (A&M/CTI, 1969)
- 1969: Stonebone (A&M/CTI (Japan), 1970)

== As sideman ==
With Count Basie

- The Bosses (Pablo, 1973)
- Basie Jam (Pablo, 1974) – rec. 1973
- Kansas City 7 (Pablo, 1980)

With Miles Davis

- Birth of the Cool (Capitol, 1949)
- Young Man with a Horn (Blue Note, 1952)
- Walkin' (Prestige, 1954)
- Miles Davis Volume 1 (Blue Note, 1956)
- Miles Davis Volume 2 (Blue Note, 1956)

With Dizzy Gillespie

- The Complete RCA Victor Recordings (Bluebird, 1995) – rec. 1937–49
- Dee Gee Days: The Savoy Sessions (Savoy, 1976) – rec. 1951–52
- Afro (Norgran, 1954)
- Dizzy and Strings (Norgran, 1954)
- Perceptions (Verve, 1961) - composer and arranger

With Oliver Nelson

- Happenings with Hank Jones (Impulse!, 1966)
- Encyclopedia of Jazz (Verve, 1966)
- The Sound of Feeling (Verve, 1966)

With Sonny Rollins

- Sonny Rollins, Vol. 2 (Blue Note, 1957)
- Alfie (Impulse!, 1966)

With Lalo Schifrin

- New Fantasy (Verve, 1964)
- Once a Thief and Other Themes (Verve, 1965)

With Sonny Stitt

- Sonny Stitt Plays Arrangements from the Pen of Quincy Jones (Roost, 1955)
- The Matadors Meet the Bull (Roulette, 1965)
- What's New!!! (Roulette, 1966)

With others

- Cannonball Adderley, Julian "Cannonball" Adderley (EmArcy, 1955)
- Nat Adderley, Sayin' Somethin' (Atlantic, 1966)
- Manny Albam, The Soul of the City (Solid State, 1966)
- Kenny Burrell, Night Song (Verve, 1969)
- Donald Byrd, I'm Tryin' to Get Home (Blue Note, 1964)
- Ron Carter, New York Slick (Milestone, 1979)
- Paul Desmond, Summertime (A&M/CTI, 1968)
- Kenny Dorham, Afro-Cuban (Blue Note, 1955)
- Ella Fitzgerald, At the Opera House (Verve, 1957)
- Benny Golson, The Modern Touch (Riverside, 1957)
- Coleman Hawkins, The Hawk Flies High (1957)
- Billie Holiday, Lady in Satin (Columbia, 1958)
- Milt Jackson, Bebop (East West, 1988)
- Elvin Jones, And Then Again (Atlantic, 1965)
- John Lewis, The Modern Jazz Society Presents a Concert of Contemporary Music (Norgran, 1955)
- Howard McGhee, Howard McGhee, Vol. 1 (Blue Note, 1950)
- Jimmy McGriff The Big Band (Solid State, 1966)
- Chico O'Farrill, Nine Flags (Impulse!, 1966)
- Charlie Parker, Charlie Parker on Dial (Dial, 1947)
- Moacir Santos, Carnival of the Spirits (Blue Note, 1975)
- Horace Silver, The Cape Verdean Blues (Blue Note, 1965)
- Steve Turre, Steve Turre (Verve, 1996)
- Stanley Turrentine, Joyride (Blue Note, 1965)

== Soundtracks ==
- Man And Boy (Sussex, 1971) – with Quincy Jones featuring Bill Withers
- Across 110th Street (United Artists, 1972) – with Bobby Womack
- Top of the Heap (Fanfare Corp. & St. John Unlimited Prod., 1972) with Christopher St. John
- Cleopatra Jones (Warner, 1973) – with Joe Simon featuring Millie Jackson
- Willie Dynamite (MCA, 1974) – featuring Martha Reeves & The Sweet Things

== Other notable recordings ==
- The Birdlanders, Vol. 1, ...Vol. 2, ...Vol. 3 (Period, 1954) – with Henri Renaud, Al Cohn, Milt Jackson, …
- Aurex Jazz Festival '82 - Live Special (East World, 1982)
- Carnegie Hall Salutes the Jazz Masters (Verve, 1994)
