= The Eminent Jay Jay Johnson =

The Eminent Jay Jay Johnson may refer to:

- The Eminent Jay Jay Johnson, Vols. 1 & 2, a 1955 album by JJ Johnson
- The Eminent Jay Jay Johnson, Vol. 2, a 1954 album by JJ Johnson
- The Eminent Jay Jay Johnson, Vol. 3, a 1955 album by JJ Johnson
