= The Iron Man: Live at Smoke =

Live album by Harold Mabern
- Released: November 13, 2018
- Recorded: January 7, 2018
- Venue: Smoke
- Genre: Jazz
- Label: Smoke Sessions

Harold Mabern chronology
The Iron Man: Live at Smoke (2018)	Mabern Plays Mabern (2018)

The Iron Man: Live at Smoke is an album by pianist Harold Mabern. It was recorded in 2018 and released by Smoke Sessions Records.

== Recording and music ==
The musicians are Harold Mabern (piano), Eric Alexander (tenor sax), John Webber (bass), and Joe Farnsworth (drums). The album was recorded in concert at Smoke jazz club in New York on the final night of a three-week engagement in 2018. The material is a mix of Mabern compositions, standards, blues, and ballads.

== Release and reception ==
The album was released by Smoke Sessions Records on November 13, 2018. DownBeat wrote: "Like the gig, the record runs wide and deep – one listen hardly is enough."

== Track listing ==
All compositions by Harold Mabern except where noted

=== CD 1 ===
1. "A Few Miles from Memphis" - 7:32
2. "I Get a Kick Out of You" (Cole Porter) - 8:08
3. "I Know That You Know" (Vincent Youmans, Anne Caldwell) - 4:48
4. "I Remember Clifford" (Benny Golson) - 4:44
5. "T-Bone Steak" (Jimmy Smith) - 9:28
6. "Almost Like Being in Love" (Alan Jay Lerner, Frederick Lowe) - 8:49
7. "Dear Lord" (John Coltrane) - 5:49

=== CD 2 ===
1. "Nightlife in Tokyo" - 9:45
2. "She's Out of My Life" (Tom Bahler) - 9:03
3. "How Insensitive" (Antônio Carlos Jobim) - 10:32
4. "Mr. P.C." (Coltrane) - 5:07
5. "On a Clear Day (You Can See Forever)" (Alan Jay Lerner, Burton Lane) - 6:34
6. "You Are Too Beautiful" (Richard Rodgers, Lorenz Hart) - 5:50
7. "Rakin' and Scrapin'" - 4:29

== Personnel ==
- Harold Mabern – piano
- Eric Alexander – tenor sax
- John Webber – bass
- Joe Farnsworth – drums
