= A Touch of Satin =

Studio album by J. J. Johnson Quartet
- Released: February 1962
- Recorded: December 15 & 21, 1960 and January 12, 1961
- Studio: Columbia 30th Street Studios, New York City
- Genre: Jazz
- Length: 35:22
- Label: Columbia
- Producer: Teo Macero

J. J. Johnson chronology
The Great Kai & J. J. (1961)	A Touch of Satin (1962)	André Previn and J. J. Johnson (1961)

A Touch of Satin is an album by J. J. Johnson's Quartet which was released on the Columbia label.

== Reception ==
Professional ratings
Review scores
Source	Rating
AllMusic	3/5 stars

Allmusic awarded the album 3 stars.

== Track listing ==
No.	Title	Writer(s)	Length
1.	"Satin Doll"	Duke Ellington	4:28
2.	"Flat Back"	J.J. Johnson	4:17
3.	"Gigi"	Frederick Lowe; Alan Jay Lerner	3:19
4.	"Bloozineff"	Johnson	3:38
5.	"Jackie-ing"	Thelonious Monk	4:19
6.	"Goodbye"	Gordon Jenkins	2:08
7.	"Full Moon and Empty Arms"	Buddy Kaye; Ted Mossman	4:30
8.	"Sophisticated Lady"	Ellington; Irving Mills; Mitchell Parish	2:33
9.	"When the Saints Go Marching In"	Traditional	6:10
Total length:			35:22

- Recorded at Columbia 30th Street Studios on December 15, 1960 (tracks 1–4), December 21, 1960 (tracks 6 & 9) and January 12, 1961 (tracks 5, 7 & 8)

== Personnel ==
- J. J. Johnson – trombone
- Victor Feldman – piano, vibraphone, celeste
- Sam Jones – bass
- Louis Hayes – drums
