= The Eminent Jay Jay Johnson, Vols. 1 & 2 =

The Eminent Jay Jay Johnson
- Volume 1

Compilation album by J. J. Johnson
- Released: 1956
- Recorded: June 22, 1953; September 24, 1954; June 6, 1955
- Studio: WOR Studios, NYC; Van Gelder Studio, Hackensack, NJ
- Genre: Jazz
- Length: 40:13
- Label: Blue Note; BLP 1505 (Vol. 1); BLP 1506 (Vol. 2)
- Producer: Alfred Lion; Michael Cuscuna (Reissue)

J. J. Johnson chronology
The Eminent Jay Jay Johnson Volume 3 (1955)	The Eminent Jay Jay Johnson (1956)	J Is for Jazz (1956)

The Eminent Jay Jay Johnson
- Volume 2

The Eminent Jay Jay Johnson, Vols. 1 & 2 are a pair of separate but related compilation albums by American jazz trombonist J. J. Johnson, recorded over three sessions between 1953 and 1955 and released on Blue Note in 1956.

== Background ==
=== Recording and production ===
Johnson recorded three sessions for Blue Note—one with Doug Hawkins in New York City on June 22, 1953 and two with Rudy Van Gelder at his home studio in Hackensack, New Jersey on September 24, 1954 and June 6, 1955—resulting in three ten-inches: Jay Jay Johnson with Clifford Brown (1953), The Eminent Jay Jay Johnson Volume 2 (1954), and The Eminent Jay Jay Johnson Volume 3 (1955), respectively.

=== Personal life ===
At the time of the 1953 recording session, Johnson had withdrawn from full-time playing to work as a blueprint inspector.

=== Release history ===
After 10"s lost the format war, Blue Note began reissuing its Modern Jazz Series on 12"s. The three sessions were subsequently recompiled across The Eminent Jay Jay Johnson, Volume 1 (BLP 1505) and The Eminent Jay Jay Johnson, Volume 2 (BLP 1506).

The two volumes were recompiled for their CD reissue, restoring the track listing of the original 10"s, placing Vol. 1 (BLP 2028) on Volume 1, and Vol. 2 (BLP 5057) and Vol. 3 (BLP 5070) on Volume 2. Three alternate takes were added to each CD, from the 1953 session (Volume 1) and the 1955 session (Volume 2).

== Reception ==
Professional ratings
Review scores
Source	Rating
AllMusic (Vol. 1)	4.5/5 stars
AllMusic (Vol. 2)	4.5/5 stars
The Penguin Guide to Jazz (Vol. 1)	👑
The Penguin Guide to Jazz (Vol. 2)	👑

The AllMusic review of Volume 1 by Scott Yanow states, "Although Johnson has a couple of features, Clifford Brown largely steals the show".

The AllMusic review of Volume 2 by Stephen Cook states, "J.J. Johnson's Blue Note sides from the first half of the '50s represent some of the best bop of the day. And for listeners interested in just picking up one of the trombonist's early dates, this second installment of his Eminent J.J. Johnson series is the one to get ... a bop classic."

The Penguin Guide to Jazz awarded both volumes four-out-of-four stars, and the first volume a "Crown", calling it "one of the central documents of post-war jazz."

== Track listing ==
=== The Eminent Jay Jay Johnson, Volume 1 ===
Side 1
No.	Title	Writer(s)	Date recorded	Length
1.	"Turnpike"	J. J. Johnson	June 22, 1953	4:15
2.	"Lover Man"	Jimmy Davis; Ram Ramirez; James Sherman	June 22, 1953	3:50
3.	"Get Happy"	Harold Arlen; Ted Koehler	June 22, 1953	4:47
4.	"Sketch 1"	John Lewis	June 22, 1953	4:21
5.	"Capri"	Gigi Gryce	June 22, 1953	3:37

Side 2
No.	Title	Writer(s)	Date recorded	Length
1.	"Jay"	J. J. Johnson	September 24, 1954	3:42
2.	"Old Devil Moon"	E. Y. Harburg; Burton Lane	September 24, 1954	3:52
3.	"It's You or No One"	Sammy Cahn; Jule Styne	September 24, 1954	4:06
4.	"Too Marvelous for Words"	Johnny Mercer; Richard A. Whiting	September 24, 1954	3:35
5.	"Coffee Pot"	J. J. Johnson	September 24, 1954	4:08

=== The Eminent Jay Jay Johnson, Volume 2 ===
Side 1
No.	Title	Writer(s)	Date recorded	Length
1.	""Daylie" Double"		June 6, 1955	4:27
2.	"Pennies from Heaven"	Johnny Burke; Arthur Johnston	June 6, 1955	4:18
3.	"You're Mine, You"	Johnny Green; Edward Heyman	June 6, 1955	3:07
4.	"Turnpike" (alt. take)		June 22, 1953	4:10
5.	"It Could Happen to You"	Johnny Burke; Jimmy Van Heusen	June 22, 1953	4:42

Side 2
No.	Title	Writer(s)	Date recorded	Length
1.	"Groovin'"		June 6, 1955	4:40
2.	"Portrait of Jennie"	Gordon Burdge; J. Russel Robinson	June 6, 1955	2:56
3.	"Viscosity"		June 6, 1955	4:21
4.	"Time After Time"	Cahn; Styne	September 24, 1954	4:13
5.	"Capri" (alt. take)		June 22, 1953	3:47

=== 2001 CD reissues ===
The Eminent Jay Jay Johnson, Volume 1
No.	Title	Writer(s)	Date recorded	Length
1.	"Capri"	Gigi Gryce	June 22, 1953	3:37
2.	"Lover Man"	Jimmy Davis; Ram Ramirez; James Sherman	June 22, 1953	3:50
3.	"Turnpike"	J. J. Johnson	June 22, 1953	4:15
4.	"Sketch 1"	John Lewis	June 22, 1953	4:21
5.	"It Could Happen to You"	Johnny Burke; Jimmy Van Heusen	June 22, 1953	4:42
6.	"Get Happy"	Harold Arlen; Ted Koehler	June 22, 1953	4:47
7.	"Capri" (alternate take)	Gryce	June 22, 1953	3:47
8.	"Turnpike" (alternate take)	Johnson	June 22, 1953	4:10
9.	"Get Happy" (alternate take)	Arlen; Koehler	June 22, 1953	4:11

The Eminent Jay Jay Johnson, Volume 2
No.	Title	Writer(s)	Date recorded	Length
1.	"Too Marvelous for Words"	Mercer; Whiting	September 24, 1954	3:35
2.	"Jay"		September 24, 1954	3:42
3.	"Old Devil Moon""	Harburg; Lane	September 24, 1954	3:52
4.	"It's You or No One"	Cahn; Styne	September 24, 1954	4:06
5.	"Time After Time"	Cahn; Styne	September 24, 1954	4:13
6.	"Coffee Pot"		September 24, 1954	4:08
7.	"Pennies from Heaven"	Burke; Johnston	June 6, 1955	4:18
8.	"Viscosity"		June 6, 1955	4:21
9.	"You're Mine, You"	Green; Heyman	June 6, 1955	3:07
10.	""Daylie" Double"		June 6, 1955	4:27
11.	"Groovin'"		June 6, 1955	4:40
12.	"Portrait of Jennie"	Burdge; Robinson	June 6, 1955	2:56
13.	"Pennies from Heaven" (alternate take)		June 6, 1955	4:25
14.	"Viscosity" (alternate take)		June 6, 1955	4:21
15.	""Daylie" Double" (alternate take)		June 6, 1955	4:38

- The 1989/1997 Blue Note CD re-issues include the same content as the 2001 CD, but the tracks are arranged chronologically by recording date.

== Personnel ==
=== Musicians ===
==== June 22, 1953 ====
- J.J. Johnson – trombone
- Clifford Brown – trumpet (except "It Could Happen to You")
- Jimmy Heath – tenor and baritone saxophones (except "It Could Happen to You")
- John Lewis – piano
- Percy Heath – bass
- Kenny Clarke – drums

==== September 24, 1954 ====
- J.J. Johnson – trombone
- Wynton Kelly – piano
- Charles Mingus – bass
- Kenny Clarke – drums
- Sabu Martinez – congas (except "It's You or No One" and "Time After Time")

==== June 6, 1955 ====
- J.J. Johnson – trombone
- Hank Mobley – tenor saxophone
- Horace Silver – piano
- Paul Chambers – bass
- Kenny Clarke – drums

=== Technical personnel ===
==== Original ====
- Alfred Lion – producer
- Doug Hawkins (1953) – recording engineer
- Rudy Van Gelder (1954, 1955) – recording engineer
- John Hermansader – cover design
- Francis Wolff – photography
- Bob Blumenthal – liner notes

==== Reissue ====
- Michael Cuscuna – reissue producer
- Gordon H Jee – creative director
- Rudy Van Gelder – 2001 remaster
- Ron McMaster – digital transfers
