= Trombonium =

Marching valve trombone in upright form

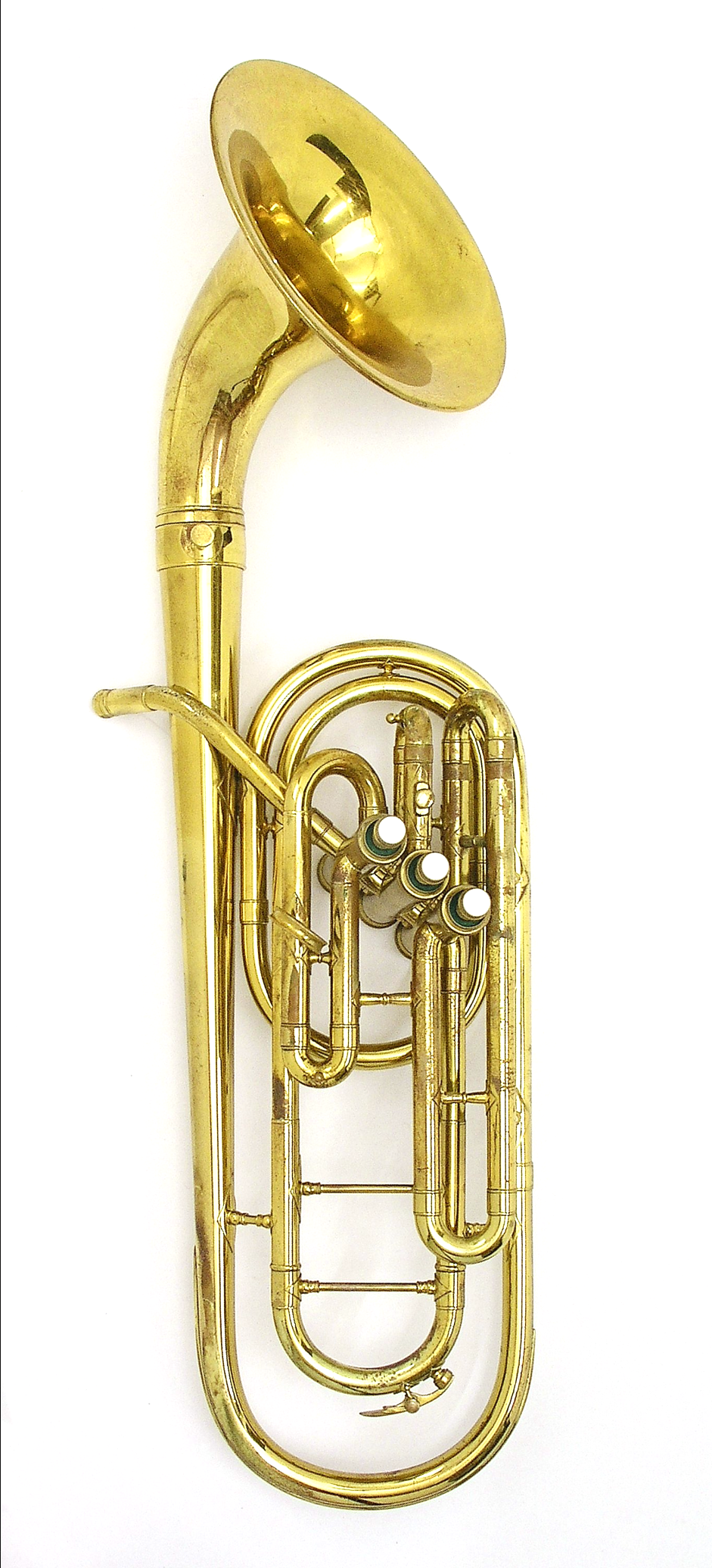
- King trombonium in B♭

Brass instrument
- Classification: Aerophone; Wind; Labrosone; Valved brass; Cylindrical bore
- Hornbostel–Sachs classification: 423.233.2 (Lip-reed aerophone with valves and cylindrical bore longer than 2 meters)
- Timbre: Trombone

Related instruments
- Valve trombone; Flugabone; Baritone

Musicians
- Darrell Leonard; J. J. Johnson; Kai Winding

Builders
- C. G. Conn; E. H. White

The trombonium is a valve trombone in upright form, formerly manufactured by E. H. White under its "King" label. It was unveiled by H.N. White in 1938 and manufactured until the mid 1970s. In the early 1970s, C. G. Conn also manufactured a similar instrument as their 90G model valve trombone.

The trombonium has a timbre similar to a trombone. It is built with valves instead of a slide, in a compact upright form superficially resembling a baritone or euphonium, suitable for use in marching bands. A similar-sounding marching trombone is the flugabone, which is wrapped similar to a bass trumpet. The trombonium was used by the University of Southern California Marching Band and on a handful of jazz recordings (e.g., Jay and Kai + 6).
