= Billy Childs =

American jazz pianist, arranger and conductor (born 1957)

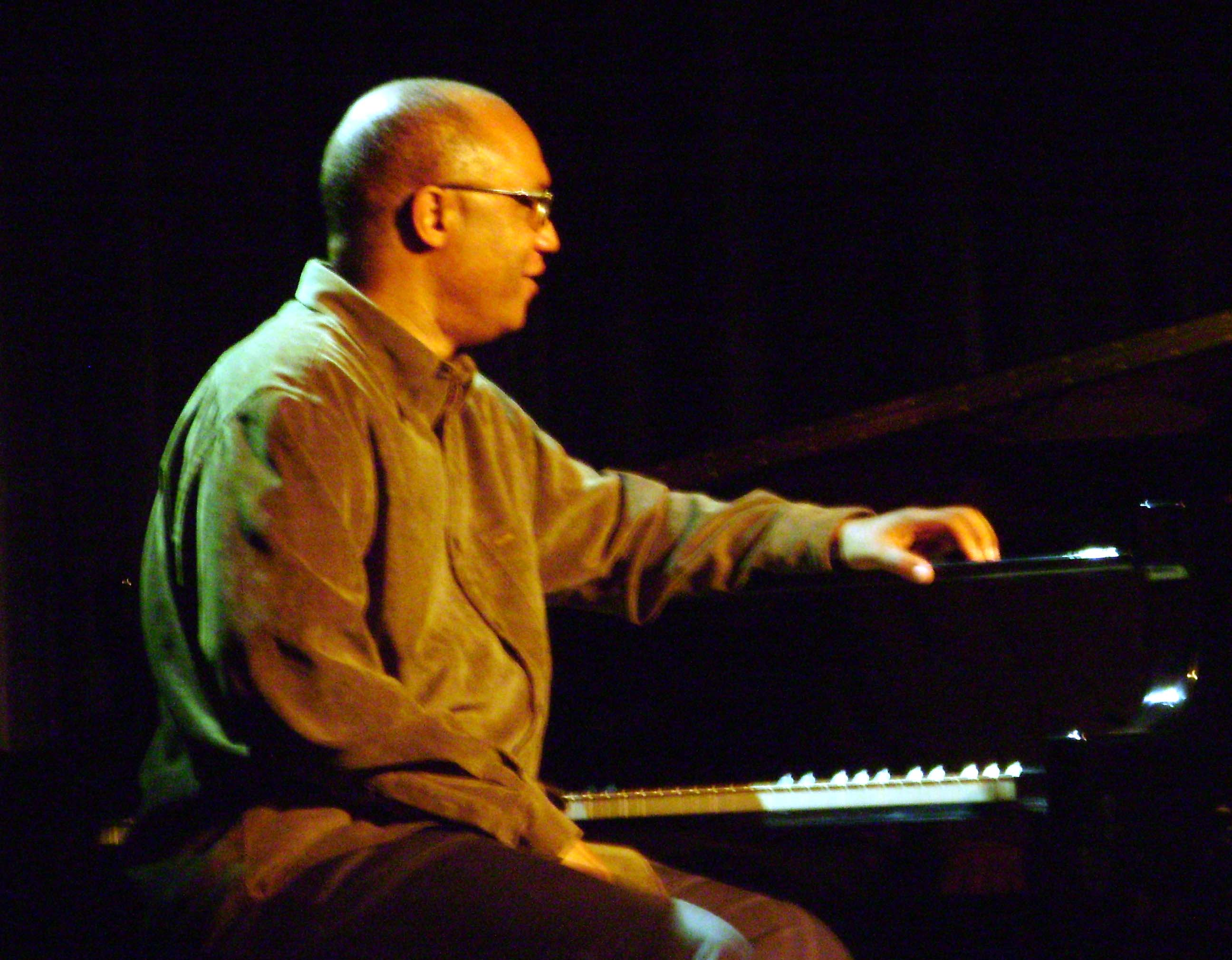
- Childs performing at Treibhaus in Innsbruck, Austria, 2008

Background information
- Born: William Edward Childs; March 8, 1957 (age 69); Los Angeles, California, US
- Genre: Jazz
- Occupation: Musician
- Instrument: Piano
- Years active: 1977–present
- Label: Stretch Records

William Edward Childs (born March 8, 1957) is an American composer, jazz pianist, arranger, and conductor from Los Angeles, California.

Childs's In the Arms of the Beloved was a finalist for the 2026 Pulitzer Prize for Music.

== Early life ==
When he was 16, Childs attended the Community School of the Performing Arts sponsored by the University of Southern California (USC). He studied music theory with Marienne Uszler and piano with John Weisenfluh. From 1975 to 1979, Childs attended USC and earned a degree in composition under the tutelage of Robert Linn.

While still a teenager, Childs was playing professionally. He made his recording debut in 1977 with the J. J. Johnson Quintet during a tour of Japan, documented as "the Yokohama Concert". Childs gained significant attention during the six years (1978–84) he spent in trumpeter Freddie Hubbard's group. His early influences as a pianist included Herbie Hancock, Keith Emerson, and Chick Corea. As a composer he is influenced by Paul Hindemith, Maurice Ravel, and Igor Stravinsky.

Childs's sister is the playwright Kirsten Childs.

== Solo albums ==
Childs's solo jazz recording career began in 1988, when he released Take for Example, This..., the first of four critically acclaimed albums on Windham Hill Jazz. He followed that with Twilight Is Upon Us (1989), His April Touch (1992), and Portrait of a Player (1993). Chick Corea asked Childs to join his label, Stretch Records. Childs's next album, I've Known Rivers, appeared on Stretch/GRP (now Stretch Records/Concord Records) in 1995. The Child Within on Shanachie Records was released in 1996.

== Arranging ==
In 2000, Childs arranged, orchestrated, and conducted Dianne Reeves's project The Calling: Celebrating Sarah Vaughan, which won the Grammy Award for Best Jazz Vocal Album. Other artists and producers for whom he has arranged include Sting, Yo-Yo Ma, Chris Botti, Gladys Knight, Michael Bublé, David Foster, Phil Ramone, and Claudia Acuña.

== Jazz chamber ensemble ==
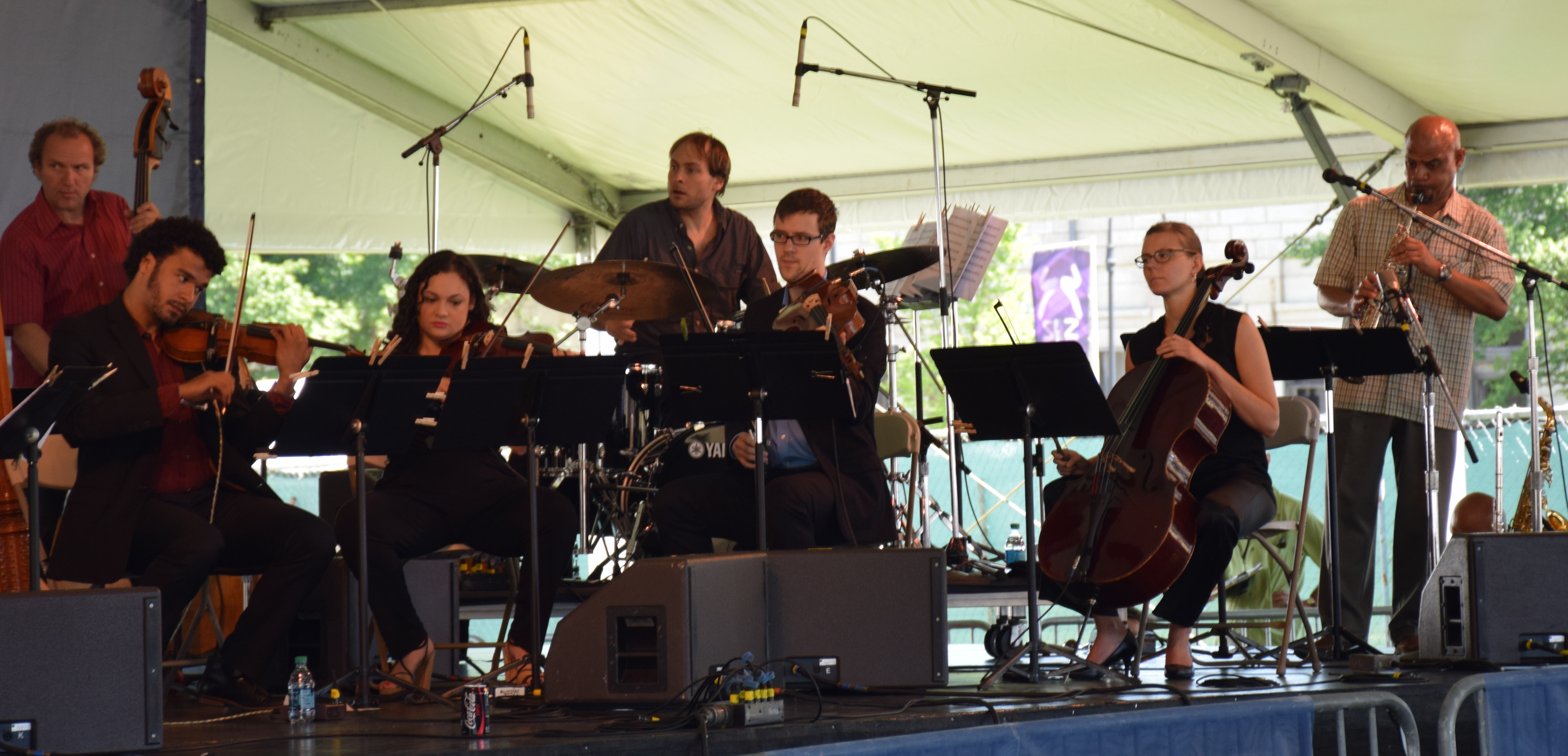
The Ensemble at the Newport Jazz Festival in Newport, Rhode Island, August 2015

In 2001, Childs formed a chamber jazz group consisting of piano, bass, drums, acoustic guitar, harp, and woodwinds. Sometimes the core group is augmented by string quartet, woodwind quintet, or both. Childs was influenced by Laura Nyro's collaborations with Alice Coltrane (on Christmas and the Beads of Sweat) and by a desire to merge classical and jazz music. In 2005, the ensemble released its first album, Lyric, Jazz-Chamber Music, Vol. 1, which was nominated for three Grammy awards: Best Jazz Instrumental Album, Best Instrumental Composition, and Best Arrangement, and won best instrumental composition for "Into the Light".

== Awards and honors ==
- 2003: New Composition Grant, Chamber Music America
- 2006: Grammy Award for Best Instrumental Composition, "Into the Light"
- 2006 Grammy Award, Best Arrangement Accompanying a Vocalist, "What Are You Doing The Rest of Your Life?"
- 2009: Guggenheim Fellowship
- 2011: Grammy Award for Best Instrumental Composition, "The Path Among the Trees"
- 2013: Doris Duke Artist Award
- 2015: American Academy of Arts and Letters Composer Award
- 2015: Grammy Award for Best Arrangement, Instrumental and Vocals, "New York Tendaberry"
- 2018: Grammy Award for Best Jazz Instrumental Album, Rebirth; Childs' solo on the track "Dance of Shiva" was also nominated for the Grammy Award for Best Improvised Jazz Solo.
- 2018: Outstanding Alumnus, University of Southern California Thornton School of Music
- 2024: Grammy Award for Best Jazz Instrumental Album, The Winds of Change

== Classical commissions ==
- 1993: Los Angeles Philharmonic, "Tone Poem for Holly" (Esa-Pekka Salonen conductor)
- 1994: Los Angeles Philharmonic, "Fanfare for the United Races of America" (Salonen conductor)
- 1995: Akron Symphony Orchestra, "The Distant Land" (Alan Balter conductor)
- 1997: Akron Symphony Orchestra and Chorus, "Just Like Job" (Balter conductor)
- 1997: Dorian Wind Quintet, "A Day in the Forest of Dreams" (Childs piano, with Dorian Wind Quintet)
- 2004: Los Angeles Philharmonic, "For Suzanne" (Dianne Reeves vocal soloist, Childs piano soloist)
- 2005: Los Angeles Master Chorale, "The Voices of Angels" (Grant Gershon conductor)
- 2007: American Brass Quintet, "2 Elements" (Childs piano, with American Brass Quintet)
- 2007: Fontana Chamber Arts, "The Path Among the Trees" (Billy Childs' JazzChamber Ensemble with Ying Quartet)
- 2009: Pacific Serenades, "String Quartet No. 1"
- 2010: Detroit Symphony, "Concerto for Violin and Orchestra" (Regina Carter, soloist)
- 2012: Ying Quartet, "Awakening String Quartet No. 2" (The Ying Quartet)
- 2022: Young Concert Artists (and a consortium of nine orchestras), "Diaspora: Concerto for Saxophone and Orchestra" (Steven Banks, soloist)

== Jazz commissions ==
- 1992: Grenoble Jazz Festival, "Chamber Orchestra Music" (Steve Houghton soloist)
- 1994: Monterey Jazz Festival, "Concerto Piano and JazzChamber Orchestra" (Childs soloist)
- 1997: Mancini Institute, "The Winds of Change" (Roy Hargrove soloist)
- 2001: Kuumbwa Jazz Center "Into the Light" (Billy Childs JazzChamber Ensemble)
- 2004: Lincoln Center Jazz Orchestra, "The Fierce Urgency of Now" (Wynton Marsalis musical director)
- 2010: Monterey Jazz Festival, "Music for Two Quartets" (Kronos Quartet with Childs, Brian Blade, Scott Colley, and Steve Wilson)

== Discography ==
=== As leader ===
Title	Label	Year released	Notes
Midland	Lunacy Records	1985	
Take for Example This...	Windham Hill Records	1988	
Twilight Is Upon Us	Windham Hill	1989	Top Jazz Albums 11
His April Touch	Windham Hill	1991	
Portrait of a Player	Windham Hill	1993	Top Jazz Albums 12
I've Known Rivers	Stretch Records	1995	
The Child Within	Shanachie Records	1996	
Skim Coat	Metropolitan Records	1999	
Bedtime Stories	32 Jazz	2000	
Lyric: Jazz Chamber Music Vol. 1	Lunacy Music	2005	Grammy Award for Best Instrumental Composition (Into the Light)
Autumn: In Moving Pictures (Jazz Chamber Music Vol. 2)	Lunacy Music	2009	Grammy Award for Best Instrumental Composition (The Path Among the Trees)
Map to the Treasure: Reimagining Laura Nyro	Sony Masterworks	2014	Top Jazz Albums 1, The Billboard 200 104
Rebirth	Mack Avenue	2017	Grammy Award for Best Jazz Instrumental Album
Acceptance	Mack Avenue	2020	
The Winds of Change	Mack Avenue	2023	Grammy Award for Best Jazz Instrumental Album Quartet with Ambrose Akinmusire (trumpet), Scott Colley (bass), Brian Blade (drums)

Main source:

=== As sideman ===
With Chris Botti

- When I Fall In Love (Columbia, 2004)

With Lou Rawls

- Seasons 4 U (Rawls & Brokaw, 1998)

With Bunky Green

- Healing the Pain (Delos, 1990)

With J. J. Johnson and Nat Adderley

- The Yokohama Concert (Pablo Live, 1978)
- Concepts in Blue (Pablo Today, 1981)
- Chain Reaction: Yokohama Concert, Vol. 2 (Pablo, 2002) – rec. 1977

With Bunny Brunel

- For you to play (Nikaia Records, 1994)
