= J.J. Inc. =

Studio album by J. J. Johnson
- Released: April 10, 1961
- Recorded: August 1 & 3, 1960
- Genre: Jazz
- Label: Columbia
- Producer: Teo Macero

J. J. Johnson chronology
Trombone and Voices (1960)	J.J. Inc. (1961)	The Great Kai & J. J. (1961)

J.J. Inc. is an album by jazz trombonist J. J. Johnson, released in 1961.

== Reception ==
Trombonist Steve Turre said of the album, "J.J. Inc. finds the master in a sextet setting, with an incredible line-up of young talent." He further states, "You can hear more blues in J.J.'s solos than in his younger bandmates, and that depth of feeling is always apparent in whatever he plays, whenever he plays. J.J. said that this was one of the best groups he ever put together, and he enjoyed playing with them very much." AllMusic's Scott Yanow rated the album four and a half stars and described it as "a fine straight ahead set".

The Penguin Guide to Jazz rated the album three and a half out of four stars, stating that "Aquarius is the best evidence yet of J.J.'s great skills as a composer-arranger."

== Track listing ==
All compositions by Johnson except where noted.

1. "Mohawk" – 9:22
2. "Minor Mist" - 5:08
3. "In Walked Horace" - 5:11
4. "Fatback" - 6:35
5. "Aquarius" - 5:56
6. "Shutterbug" - 7:25
7. "Blue and Boogie" (Dizzy Gillespie, Frank Paparelli) - 5:51 (CD bonus track)
8. "Turnpike" - 13:06 (CD bonus track)
9. "Fatback" - 11:42 (CD bonus track)

== Personnel ==
- J. J. Johnson – trombone
- Freddie Hubbard – trumpet
- Clifford Jordan – tenor saxophone
- Cedar Walton – piano
- Arthur Harper – double bass
- Albert Heath – drums

== See also ==
- J. J. Johnson discography
