= Trombone and Voices =

Studio album by J. J. Johnson
- Released: November 1960
- Recorded: June 1960
- Genre: Jazz
- Label: Columbia; CL 1547/CS-8178

J. J. Johnson chronology
Really Livin' (1959)	Trombone and Voices (1960)	J.J. Inc. (1961)

Trombone and Voices is an album by J. J. Johnson with an Orchestra and Choir arranged and conducted by Frank De Vol which was released on the Columbia label.

== Reception ==
Professional ratings
Review scores
Source	Rating
Allmusic	3/5 stars

Allmusic awarded the album 3 stars.

== Track listing ==
1. "Jennie's Song" (Bernard Herrmann) - 3:31
2. "Only The Lonely" (Jimmy Van Heusen, Sammy Cahn) - 3:32
3. "Sometimes I Feel Like a Motherless Child" (Traditional) - 3:12
4. "In a Sentimental Mood" (Duke Ellington) - 2:35
5. "Get Out of Town" (Cole Porter) - 2:16
6. "I'm Glad There Is You" (Jimmy Dorsey, Paul Madeira) - 2:27
7. "You're My Girl" (Jule Styne, Cahn) - 3:59
8. "To the Ends of the Earth" (Noel Sherman, Joe Sherman) - 2:59
9. "What Is There to Say" (Vernon Duke, Yip Harburg) - 2:20
10. "Lazy Bones" (Hoagy Carmichael, Johnny Mercer) - 3:00

== Personnel ==
- J. J. Johnson – trombone
- Unidentified Orchestra and Choir arranged and conducted by Frank De Vol
