= At the Opera House =

Live album by Ella Fitzgerald
- Released: 1958
- Recorded: September 29, 1957; Chicago Opera House, Chicago; October 7, 1957; Shrine Auditorium, Los Angeles
- Genre: Jazz
- Length: 32:10 (original LP); 59:20 (CD reissue)
- Labels: Verve; MGV-8264
- Producer: Norman Granz

Ella Fitzgerald chronology
Porgy and Bess (1957)	At the Opera House (1958)	Ella Fitzgerald and Billie Holiday at Newport (1958)

At the Opera House is a 1958 live album by Ella Fitzgerald. The album presents a recording of the 1957 Jazz at the Philharmonic Concerts. This series of live jazz concerts was devised by Fitzgerald's manager Norman Granz; they ran from 1944 to 1983. Featured on this occasion, in 1957, are Fitzgerald and the leading jazz players of the day in an onstage jam session. The first half of the 1990 CD edition includes a performance that was recorded on September 29, 1957, at Chicago's Civic Opera House, whilst the second half highlights the concert recorded on October 7, 1957, at the Shrine Auditorium, in Los Angeles. The original LP obviously included only the mono tracks (#10–18).

This album is typical of Ella's concert repertoire in the mid-1950s, singing swing standards, and songs referencing her recent 'Songbook' series, in this case, the Cole Porter and Rodgers and Hart songbooks.

== Reception ==
Writing for AllMusic, music critic Scott Yanow wrote, "this album is mostly recommended to her greatest fans. However, the music is wonderful, there are variations between the different versions, and her voice was at its prime".

For the 1986 Verve CD re-issue Ella Fitzgerald at the Opera House, Verve 831-269-2

Professional ratings
Review scores
Source	Rating
AllMusic	4.5/5 stars
The Encyclopedia of Popular Music	4/5 stars
The Penguin Guide to Jazz Recordings	3/4 stars

== Track listing ==
1. "It's All Right with Me" (Cole Porter) – 2:32
2. "Don'cha Go 'Way Mad" (Jimmy Mundy, Illinois Jacquet, Al Stillman) – 2:42
3. "Bewitched, Bothered and Bewildered" (Richard Rodgers, Lorenz Hart) – 3:01
4. "These Foolish Things (Remind Me of You)" (Jack Strachey, Harry Link, Holt Marvell) – 3:46
5. "Ill Wind" (Harold Arlen, Ted Koehler) – 2:47
6. "Goody Goody" (Johnny Mercer, Matty Malneck) – 1:54
7. "Moonlight in Vermont" (Karl Suessdorf, John Blackburn) – 3:06
8. "Them There Eyes" (Maceo Pinkard, Doris Tauber, William Tracey) – 2:08
9. "Stompin' at the Savoy" (Benny Goodman, Edgar Sampson, Chick Webb, Andy Razaf) – 5:14

Tracks 1–9 recorded in stereo on September 29, 1957, at the Chicago Opera House.

10. "It's All Right with Me" – 2:45
11. "Don'cha Go Way Mad" – 2:31
12. "Bewitched, Bothered and Bewildered" – 3:22
13. "These Foolish Things" – 3:49
14. "Ill Wind" – 2:53
15. "Goody Goody" – 1:55
16. "Moonlight in Vermont" – 3:15
17. "Stompin' at the Savoy" – 7:15
18. "Oh, Lady Be Good!" (George Gershwin, Ira Gershwin) – 4:25

Tracks 10–18 recorded in mono on October 7, 1957, at the Shrine Auditorium, Los Angeles.

== Personnel ==
=== Tracks 1–16 ===
- Ella Fitzgerald - Vocals
- Oscar Peterson - Piano
- Herb Ellis - Guitar
- Ray Brown - Bass
- Jo Jones - Drums

=== Tracks 17–18 ===
- Ella Fitzgerald - Vocals
- Oscar Peterson - Piano
- Herb Ellis - Guitar
- Ray Brown - Bass
- Connie Kay - Drums
- Roy Eldridge - Trumpet
- J. J. Johnson - Trombone
- Sonny Stitt - Alto Sax
- Lester Young - Tenor Sax
- Illinois Jacquet - Tenor Sax
- Coleman Hawkins - Tenor Sax
- Stan Getz - Tenor Sax
- Flip Phillips - Tenor Sax

== See also ==
- Stan Getz and J. J. Johnson at the Opera House (Verve, 1957)
- The Modern Jazz Quartet and the Oscar Peterson Trio at the Opera House (Verve, 1957)
