= Rebirth (Billy Childs album) =

Studio album by Billy Childs
- Released: March 24, 2017
- Recorded: Avatar (New York, New York)
- Genre: Jazz
- Length: 56:26
- Label: Mack Avenue
- Producer: Billy Childs, Al Pryor

Billy Childs chronology
Map to the Treasure: Reimagining Laura Nyro (2014)	Rebirth (2017)

Professional ratings
Review scores
Source	Rating
All About Jazz	4.5/5 stars
The Guardian	4/5 stars

Rebirth is a studio album by Billy Childs, released on March 24, 2017. The title references the return to his hard-bop playing of the 1970s.

The album earned Childs his fifth Grammy Award – his first for Best Jazz Instrumental Album.

== Track listing ==
1. "Backwards Bop" (Billy Childs) – 6:38
2. "Rebirth" (Childs, Claudia Acuña) – 7:38
3. "Stay" (Childs) – 5:59
4. "Dance of Shiva" (Childs) – 6:49
5. "Tightrope" (Childs) – 6:37
6. "The Starry Night" (Childs) – 8:10
7. "The Windmills of Your Mind" (Michel Legrand, Alan and Marilyn Bergman) – 7:10
8. "Peace" (Horace Silver) – 7:29

== Personnel ==
- Billy Childs – piano, producer
- Steve Wilson – alto and soprano saxophone
- Hans Glawischnig – acoustic bass
- Eric Harland – drums
- Claudia Acuña – vocals (on "Rebirth")
- Alicia Olatuja – vocals (on "Stay")
- Ido Meshulam – trombone (on "Rebirth")
- Rogerio Boccato – percussion (on "Rebirth")
- Gretchen Valade, Myles Weinstein – executive producers
- Rich Breen – recording, mixing and mastering engineer
- Nate Odden – assistant engineer
