= K + J.J. =

Studio album by J. J. Johnson and Kai Winding
- Released: 1955
- Recorded: January 26 & 27, 1955; New York City
- Genre: Jazz
- Label: Bethlehem; BCP 6001
- Producer: Creed Taylor

Kai Winding chronology
Jay and Kai Dec. 3, 1954 (1954)	K + J.J. (1955)	Trombone for Two (1955)

J. J. Johnson chronology
Jay and Kai Dec. 3, 1954 (1954)	K + J.J. (1955)	The Eminent Jay Jay Johnson Volume 3 (1955)

"Nuf Said" Cover

K + J.J. (also released as "Nuf Said") is an album by American jazz trombonists J. J. Johnson and Kai Winding featuring performances recorded in 1955 for the Bethlehem label.

== Reception ==
Professional ratings
Review scores
Source	Rating
AllMusic	4.5/5 stars

AllMusic awarded the album 4½ stars and in its review by Stephen Cook, he states that "the arrangements and playing are so engaging and of such high quality that categorization dilemmas disappear. A fine disc".

== Track listing ==
1. "Out of This World" (Harold Arlen, Johnny Mercer) - 2:20
2. "Thou Swell" (Richard Rodgers, Lorenz Hart) - 2:55
3. "Lover" (Rogers, Hart) - 5:34
4. "Lope City" (J. J. Johnson) - 3:32
5. "Stolen Bass" (Johnson) - 2:56
6. "It's All Right With Me" (Cole Porter) - 5:06
7. "Mad About the Boy" (Noël Coward) - 3:32
8. "Yes Sir, That's My Baby" (Walter Donaldson, Gus Kahn) - 4:06
9. "That's How I Feel About You" (Kai Winding) - 3:59
10. "Gong Rock" (Winding) - 3:25
11. "It's All Right With Me" [alternate take 15] (Porter) - 5:31
12. "Lover" [alternate take] (Rogers, Hart) - 5:39
13. "Gong Rock" [alternate take] (Winding) - 3:25
14. "Lope City" [alternate take 11] (Johnson) - 3:42
15. "It's All Right With Me" [alternate take 11] (Porter) - 6:24
16. "Out of This World" [alternate take] (Arlen, Mercer) - 2:28
17. "That's How I Feel About You" [alternate take] (Winding) - 4:08
- Recorded in New York City on January 26, 1955 (tracks 2, 4, 6, 11, 14 & 15) and January 26 and 27, 1955 (tracks 1, 3, 5, 7–10, 12, 13, 16 & 17)

== Personnel ==
- J. J. Johnson, Kai Winding – trombone
- Dick Katz – piano
- Milt Hinton (tracks 1, 3, 5, 7–10, 12, 13, 16 & 17), Wendell Marshall (tracks 2, 4, 6, 11, 14 & 15) – bass
- Al Harewood – drums
