= Ella Fitzgerald and Billie Holiday at Newport =

Live album by Ella Fitzgerald and Billie Holiday
- Released: 1958
- Recorded: July 4–6, 1957
- Venue: Newport Jazz Festival, Freebody Park, Newport, Rhode Island
- Genre: Jazz
- Length: 71:47 (CD reissue)
- Label: Verve; MGV-8234
- Producer: Norman Granz

Ella Fitzgerald chronology
At the Opera House (1958)	Ella Fitzgerald and Billie Holiday at Newport (1958)	Ella Swings Lightly (1958)

Billie Holiday chronology
Body and Soul (1957)	Ella Fitzgerald and Billie Holiday at Newport (1958)	Songs for Distingué Lovers (1958)

Professional ratings
Review scores
Source	Rating
AllMusic	3/5 stars
Disc	2.5/5 stars
The Penguin Guide to Jazz Recordings	3/4 stars

Ella Fitzgerald and Billie Holiday at Newport is a 1958 live album by Ella Fitzgerald and Billie Holiday, recorded at the 1957 Newport Jazz Festival.

Fitzgerald's first track promoted her recent album Ella Fitzgerald Sings the Rodgers & Hart Songbook (1956), and after several teething problems with the microphone, and tempo problems on "I'm Gonna Sit Right Down (And Write Myself a Letter)", she delivers a stunning scat solo on "Air Mail Special", quoting from several recent pop hits.

Holiday is introduced by Johnny Mercer, and Carmen McRae's performance of that year was featured on the 2000 Verve CD reissue.

== Track listing ==
=== Original LP ===
Side One:

1. "This Can't Be Love" (Lorenz Hart, Richard Rodgers) – 1:44
2. "I Got It Bad (and That Ain't Good)" (Duke Ellington, Paul Francis Webster) – 4:27
3. "Body and Soul" (Frank Eyton, Johnny Green, Edward Heyman, Robert Sour) – 4:28
4. "April in Paris" (Vernon Duke, Yip Harburg) – 4:02
5. "I've Got a Crush on You" (George Gershwin, Ira Gershwin) – 2:26
6. "Air Mail Special" (Charlie Christian, Benny Goodman, Jimmy Mundy) – 4:34
7. "I Can't Give You Anything But Love" (Dorothy Fields, Jimmy McHugh) – 7:00

Side Two:

1. "Nice Work If You Can Get It" (G. Gershwin, I. Gershwin) – 2:39
2. "Willow Weep for Me" (Ann Ronell) – 3:10
3. "My Man" (Jacques Charles, Channing Pollack, Albert Willemetz, Maurice Yvain) – 3:32
4. "Lover, Come Back to Me" (Sigmund Romberg, Oscar Hammerstein II) – 2:07
5. "Lady Sings the Blues" (Billie Holiday, Herbie Nichols) – 3:02
6. "What a Little Moonlight Can Do" (Harry M. Woods) – 3:19

=== CD reissue ===
1. "This Can't Be Love" (Lorenz Hart, Richard Rodgers) – 1:44
2. "I Got It Bad (and That Ain't Good)" (Duke Ellington, Paul Francis Webster) – 4:27
3. "Body and Soul" (Frank Eyton, Johnny Green, Edward Heyman, Robert Sour) – 4:28
4. "Too Close for Comfort" (Jerry Bock, Larry Holofcener, George David Weiss) – 2:30
5. "Lullaby of Birdland" (George Shearing, Weiss) – 2:23
6. "I've Got a Crush on You" (George Gershwin, Ira Gershwin) – 2:26
7. "I'm Gonna Sit Right Down and Write Myself a Letter" (Fred E. Ahlert, Joe Young) – 2:26
8. "April in Paris" (Vernon Duke, Yip Harburg) – 4:02
9. "Air Mail Special" (Charlie Christian, Benny Goodman, Jimmy Mundy) – 4:34
10. "I Can't Give You Anything But Love" (Dorothy Fields, Jimmy McHugh) – 7:00
11. "Nice Work If You Can Get It" (G. Gershwin, I. Gershwin) – 2:39
12. "Willow Weep for Me" (Ann Ronell) – 3:10
13. "My Man" (Jacques Charles, Channing Pollack, Albert Willemetz, Maurice Yvain) – 3:32
14. "Lover, Come Back to Me" (Sigmund Romberg, Oscar Hammerstein II) – 2:07
15. "Lady Sings the Blues" (Billie Holiday, Herbie Nichols) – 3:02
16. "What a Little Moonlight Can Do" (Harry M. Woods) – 3:19
17. "I'll Remember April" (Gene de Paul, Patricia Johnston, Don Raye) – 2:44
18. "Body and Soul" – 3:34
19. Carmen McRae introduces "Skyliner" – 0:18
20. "Skyliner" (Charlie Barnet) – 2:13
21. Carmen McRae Introduces the Band and "Midnight Sun" – 1:03
22. "Midnight Sun" (Sonny Burke, Lionel Hampton, Johnny Mercer) – 4:12
23. "Our Love is Here to Stay" (G. Gershwin, I. Gershwin) – 3:14
24. "Perdido" (Ervin Drake, Hans J. Lengsfelder, Juan Tizol) – 2:47

== Personnel ==
- Tracks 1–10 (July 4, 1957)
  - Ella Fitzgerald (vocals)
  - Don Abney (piano)
  - Wendell Marshall (double bass)
  - Jo Jones (drums)
- Tracks 11–16 (July 6, 1957)
  - Billie Holiday (vocals)
  - Mal Waldron (piano)
  - Joe Benjamin (double bass)
  - Jo Jones (drums)
- Tracks 17–24 (July 5, 1957)
  - Carmen McRae (vocals, piano)
  - Ray Bryant, Junior Mance (piano)
  - Ike Issacs (double bass)
  - Jimmy Cobb, Specs Wright (drums)
