= The Winds of Change =

Studio album by Billy Childs
- Released: 2023
- Genre: Jazz
- Length: 52:29
- Label: Mack Avenue

The Winds of Change is an album by Billy Childs. It earned him a Grammy Award for Best Jazz Instrumental Album.

== Track listing ==
No.	Title	Length
1.	"The Great Western Loop"	6:22
2.	"The Winds of Change"	10:33
3.	"The End of Innocence"	8:02
4.	"Master of the Game"	7:13
5.	"Crystal Silence"	7:34
6.	"The Black Angel"	6:46
7.	"I Thought I Knew"	6:05
Total length:		52:29
