= The Eminent Jay Jay Johnson, Vol. 3 =

Studio album by J. J. Johnson
- Released: 1955
- Recorded: June 6, 1955
- Studio: Van Gelder Studio; Hackensack, New Jersey
- Genre: Jazz
- Length: 23:49
- Label: Blue Note; BLP 5070

J. J. Johnson chronology
K + J.J. (1955)	The Eminent Jay Jay Johnson, Vol. 3 (1955)	Trombone for Two (1955)

The Eminent Jay Jay Johnson, Vol. 3 is a ten-inch LP by American jazz trombonist J. J. Johnson recorded on June 6, 1955 and released on Blue Note later that year. Johnson is backed by a quintet featuring saxophonist Hank Mobley and rhythm section Horace Silver, Paul Chambers and Kenny Clarke.

== Background ==
The Eminent Jay Jay Johnson, Vol. 3 (BLP 5070) was the third of three Jay Jay Johnson albums released on Blue Note's 10-inch LP Modern Jazz 5000 Series, following Jay Jay Johnson with Clifford Brown (1953) and The Eminent Jay Jay Johnson, Volume 2 (1954). In 1955, Blue Note reissued the three sessions on two 12-inch compilations: The Eminent Jay Jay Johnson, Vols. 1 & 2 (BLP 1505/BLP 1506).

== Track listing ==
All tracks are written by J. J. Johnson, except as noted.

Side 1
No.	Title	Writer(s)	Length
1.	"Daylie Double"		4:27
2.	"You're Mine, You"	Johnny Green; Edward Heyman	3:07
3.	"Pennies from Heaven"	Johnny Burke; Arthur Johnston	4:18

Side 2
No.	Title	Writer(s)	Length
1.	"Groovin'"		4:40
2.	"Viscosity"		4:21
3.	"Portrait of Jennie"	Gordon Burdge; J. Russel Robinson	2:56

== Personnel ==
=== Musicians ===
- J. J. Johnson – trombone
- Hank Mobley – tenor saxophone
- Horace Silver – piano
- Paul Chambers – bass
- Kenny Clarke – drums

=== Technical personnel ===
- Alfred Lion – producer
- Rudy Van Gelder – recording engineer
