= Concepts in Blue =

Studio album by J. J. Johnson
- Released: 1981
- Recorded: September 23–26, 1980
- Studio: Group IV Recording Studios, Hollywood, CA
- Genre: Jazz
- Length: 43:27
- Label: Pablo Today; 2312-123
- Producer: J. J. Johnson

J. J. Johnson chronology
Pinnacles (1979)	Concepts in Blue (1981)	Jackson, Johnson, Brown, & Company (1983)

Concepts in Blue is an album by jazz trombonist J. J. Johnson, recorded in 1980 for the Pablo Today label and originally released as a CD in 2002.

== Reception ==
Professional ratings
Review scores
Source	Rating
AllMusic	4/5 stars
The Penguin Guide to Jazz Recordings	3/4 stars

The AllMusic review by Scott Yanow stated: "This is a fun set of straightahead jazz. The colorful frontline obviously enjoyed playing the blues-oriented repertoire and the solos are consistently rewarding. Nothing all that innovative occurs but the results are pleasing".

== Track listing ==
All compositions by J. J. Johnson except where noted.

1. "Blue Nun" - 5:03
2. "Nermus" - 6:10
3. "Village Blues" (John Coltrane) - 5:07
4. "Azure" - 6:00
5. "Coming Home" (Kevin Johnson) - 7:10
6. "Concepts in Blue" - 7:56
7. "Mohawk" - 6:01

== Personnel ==
- J. J. Johnson - trombone
- Clark Terry - trumpet, flugelhorn
- Ernie Watts - tenor saxophone, alto saxophone
- Victor Feldman - vibraphone, keyboards (tracks 1 & 5)
- Billy Childs (track 6), Pete Jolly (tracks 2–4 & 7) - keyboards
- Ray Brown (tracks 3, 6 & 7), Tony Dumas (tracks 1, 2, 4 & 5) - bass
- Kevin Johnson - drums
