= The Child Within =

Studio album by Billy Childs
- Released: August 20, 1996
- Genre: Jazz
- Label: Shanachie
- Producer: Billy Childs

Billy Childs chronology
I've Known Rivers (1995)	The Child Within (1996)	Skim Coat (1999)

The Child Within is an album by the American musician Billy Childs, released on August 20, 1996. Childs supported it with several live dates. The Child Within was nominated for a Grammy Award for "Best Jazz Performance, Individual or Group", with "Aaron's Song" nominated for "Best Instrumental Composition".

== Production ==
The album was produced by Childs. He was backed by Dave Holland on bass, Jeff Watts on drums, and Terence Blanchard on trumpet. Steve Wilson contributed on alto and soprano saxophone; Ravi Coltrane played tenor on one track. "The Loneliest Monk" is named for a mispronunciation of "Thelonious Monk", allegedly made by MTV's Tabitha Soren. "Theme from Chinatown" is an interpretation of Jerry Goldsmith's composition for the film Chinatown.

== Critical reception ==
Professional ratings
Review scores
Source	Rating
AllMusic	4/5 stars
MusicHound Jazz: The Essential Album Guide	5/5 stars
The Penguin Guide to Jazz on CD	3/4 stars

Billboard stated that "Childs' keyboard style is often dizzyingly funky, with a passing resemblance to the acoustic Herbie Hancock." The Ottawa Citizen said that Childs "combines intricacy with high energy ... [his] take on jazz playing is broad enough to make for interesting ballads." The New York Daily News noted that Childs "dives into fresh and inventive charts for standards and originals that organically frame the striking solos." The Washington Post said that "Childs's meld of classical grace and jazz spirit proves bracing". The Record criticized the "uncharacteristically sour play" of Blanchard.

AllMusic called the album "a dandy collection of bop-influenced originals and some well-chosen standards". MusicHound Jazz: The Essential Album Guide praised Childs's "unending melodic creativity".

== Track listing ==
No.	Title	Length
1.	"Loverman"
2.	"The Loneliest Monk"
3.	"Aaron's Song"
4.	"The Hunted"
5.	"Theme from Chinatown"
6.	"Alone Together"
7.	"Pannonica"
8.	"Just Another Day"
9.	"Dreams"
10.	"I Have a Love"
