= Dial J. J. 5 =

Studio album by J. J. Johnson
- Released: 1957
- Recorded: January 29 & 31 and May 14, 1957; Columbia 30th Street Studios, NYC
- Genre: Jazz
- Label: Columbia; CL 1084

J. J. Johnson chronology
Blue Trombone (1957)	Dial J. J. 5 (1957)	Stan Getz and J.J. Johnson at the Opera House (1957)

Dial J. J. 5 is an album by the J. J. Johnson Quintet which was released on the Columbia label.

== Reception ==
Professional ratings
Review scores
Source	Rating
Allmusic	3/5 stars

Allmusic awarded the album 3 stars.

== Track listing ==
1. "Tea Pot" (J. J. Johnson) - 5:34
2. "Barbados" (Charlie Parker) - 4:37
3. "In a Little Provincial Town" (Bobby Jaspar) - 4:21
4. "Cette Chose" (Jaspar) - 3:19
5. "Blue Haze" (Miles Davis) - 5:12
6. "Love Is Here to Stay" (George Gershwin, Ira Gershwin) - 2:48
7. "So Sorry Please" (Bud Powell) - 4:19
8. "It Could Happen to You" (Jimmy Van Heusen, Johnny Burke) - 3:52
9. "Bird Song" (Thad Jones) - 5:42
10. "Old Devil Moon" (Burton Lane, Yip Harburg) - 6:45
- Recorded at Columbia 30th Street Studios, NYC on January 29, 1957 (tracks 5, 6, 8 & 9), January 31, 1957 (tracks 2–4) and May 14, 1957 (tracks 1, 7 & 10)

== Personnel ==
- J. J. Johnson – trombone (tracks 1–6, 9, 10)
- Bobby Jaspar – tenor saxophone, flute
- Tommy Flanagan – piano
- Wilbur Little – bass
- Elvin Jones – drums
