= Really Livin' =

Studio album by The J. J. Johnson Sextet
- Released: 1959
- Recorded: March 18, 19, and 24, 1959; Columbia 30th Street Studios, NYC
- Genre: Jazz
- Length: 44:15
- Label: Columbia; CL 1383/CS 8178
- Producer: Bob Morgan and Irving Townsend

J. J. Johnson chronology
J. J. in Person! (1958)	Really Livin' (1959)	Trombone and Voices (1960)

Really Livin' is an album recorded by the J. J. Johnson Sextet which was released on the Columbia label.

== Reception ==
Professional ratings
Review scores
Source	Rating
AllMusic	3/5 stars

AllMusic awarded the album 3 stars.

== Track listing ==
1. "Me Too" (J. J. Johnson) - 6:00
2. "Decision" (Sonny Rollins) - 4:50
3. "I've Got It Bad and That Ain't Good" (Duke Ellington, Paul Francis Webster) - 4:10
4. "Red Cross" (Charlie Parker) - 2:45
5. "Almost Like Being in Love" (Frederick Loewe, Alan Jay Lerner) - 4:45
6. "Stardust" (Hoagy Carmichael, Mitchell Parish) - 4:10
7. "Sidewinder" (Johnson) - 7:05
8. "God Bless the Child" (Billie Holiday, Arthur Herzog, Jr.) - 5:18
9. "Speak Low" (Kurt Weill, Ogden Nash) - 6:27

== Personnel ==
- J. J. Johnson – trombone
- Nat Adderley – cornet
- Bobby Jaspar – tenor saxophone, flute (tracks 1, 2 & 4–9)
- Cedar Walton – piano
- Spanky DeBrest – bass
- Albert Heath – drums
