= Jay and Kai + 6 =

Studio album by The Jay and Kai Trombone Octet
- Released: 1956
- Recorded: April 2–6, 1956
- Length: 29:37
- Producer: George Avakian

J.J. Johnson and Kai Winding chronology
Trombone for Two (1956)	Jay and Kai + 6 (1956)	Dave Brubeck and Jay & Kai at Newport (1956)

Professional ratings
Review scores
Source	Rating
The Penguin Guide to Jazz Recordings	3.5/4 stars

Jay and Kai + 6 is the fifth album by jazz trombonists J.J. Johnson and Kai Winding, credited on this album as The Jay and Kai Trombone Octet. The title refers to the six trombonists (including two bass trombonists) who accompany Johnson and Winding on the recording. Columbia Records released the album (Columbia CL 892) as a monaural LP record in 1956. In December 1956, Jay and Kai + 6 reached the № 3 position on the Billboard jazz chart.

== Track listing ==
The following track listing refers to the original LP configuration.

Side one
No.	Title	Writer(s)	Arrangement	Length
1.	"A Night in Tunisia"	Gillespie	Johnson	2:25
2.	"Piece for Two Tromboniums"	Winding		2:00
3.	"Rise 'N' Shine"	De Sylva, Youmans		2:41
4.	"All at Once You Love Her"	Rodgers and Hammerstein	Winding	2:38
5.	"No Moon at All"	Evans, Mann	Johnson	2:11
6.	"The Surrey With The Fringe On Top"	Rodgers and Hammerstein		2:29
Total length:				14:44

Side two
No.	Title	Writer(s)	Arrangement	Length
1.	"The Peanut Vendor"	Simons, Gilbert, Sunshine	Winding	2:09
2.	"You're My Thrill"	Gorney, Clare		2:44
3.	"Jeanne"	Winding		2:30
4.	"Four Plus Four"	Johnson		3:11
5.	"You Don't Know What Love Is"	de Paul, Raye	Winding	2:18
6.	"The Continental"	Conrad, Magidson		2:21
Total length:				15:13

== Personnel ==
- J.J. Johnson – trombone, trombonium, arranger
- Kai Winding – trombone, trombonium, arranger
- Urbie Green – trombone
- Bob Alexander – trombone
- Eddie Bert – trombone
- Jimmy Cleveland – trombone
- Tom Mitchell – bass trombone
- Bart Varsalona – bass trombone
- Hank Jones – piano
- Milt Hinton – bass ("Piece For Two Tromboniums", "Rise 'N' Shine", "No Moon at All", "Surrey With The Fringe On Top", "You're My Thrill", "Jeanne", "You Don't Know What Love Is")
- Ray Brown – bass ("Night In Tunisia", "All At Once You Love Her", "The Peanut Vendor", "The Continental")
- Osie Johnson – drums
- Candido Camero – conga ("A Night in Tunisia"), bongo ("All At Once You Love Her", "The Peanut Vendor")
