= The Great Kai & J. J. =

Studio album by Kai Winding and J. J. Johnson
- Released: 1960
- Recorded: October 3 and November 2, 4 & 8, 1960; Van Gelder Studio, Englewood Cliffs
- Genre: Jazz
- Length: 42:12
- Label: Impulse! A-1
- Producer: Creed Taylor

Kai Winding chronology
Dance to the City Beat (1959)	The Great Kai & J. J. (1961)	The Incredible Kai Winding Trombones (1961)

J. J. Johnson chronology
J.J. Inc. (1960)	The Great Kai & J. J. (1961)	A Touch of Satin (1961)

The Great Kai & J. J. is an album by American jazz trombonists Kai Winding and J. J. Johnson featuring performances recorded in 1960 as the first release for the Impulse! label (A-1 for the mono LP, AS-1 for the stereo one).

== Reception ==
The Penguin Guide comments that this release, recorded in 1960, "was a commercially motivated reunion, some time after the partnership had been amicably dissolved." It goes on to compliment the musicianship, paying particular notice to Bill Evans' playing, which gives it the feel of "a proper group project rather than a trombone feature with accompaniment." Scott Yanow of AllMusic stated "the music still sounds fresh and lively".

Professional ratings
Review scores
Source	Rating
AllMusic	4.5/5 stars
Penguin Guide to Jazz	3.5/4 stars

== Track listing ==
1. "This Could Be the Start of Something Big" (Steve Allen) — 3:13
2. "Georgia on My Mind" (Hoagy Carmichael, Stuart Gorrell) — 3:52
3. "Blue Monk" (Monk) — 4:31
4. "Judy" (J. J. Johnson) — 4:06
5. "Alone Together" (Howard Dietz, Arthur Schwartz) — 3:36
6. "Side by Side" (Harry M. Woods) — 3:06
7. "I Concentrate on You" (Porter) — 4:03
8. "Theme from Picnic" (Allen, Duning) — 4:05
9. "Trixie" (Johnson) — 5:10
10. "Going, Going, Gong!" (Winding) — 3:11
11. "Just for a Thrill" (Lil Hardin Armstrong, Don Raye) — 3:19

Recorded on October 3, 1960 (track 1), November 2, 1960 (tracks 3, 6, 7), November 4, 1960 (tracks 5, 8, 10, 11) and November 8, 1960 (tracks 2, 4, 9)

== Personnel ==
- J. J. Johnson, Kai Winding – trombone
- Bill Evans – piano
- Paul Chambers (tracks 1, 3, 6, 7); Tommy Williams (tracks 2, 4, 5 & 8–11) – bass
- Roy Haynes (tracks 1, 3, 6, 7); Art Taylor (tracks 2, 4, 5 & 8–11) – drums
