= J. J. in Person! =

Studio album by J. J. Johnson
- Released: 1958
- Recorded: February 19, 1958; Columbia 30th Street Studios, NYC
- Genre: Jazz
- Length: 44:15
- Label: Columbia; CL 1161/CS 8009
- Producer: George Avakian

J. J. Johnson chronology
Stan Getz and J. J. Johnson at the Opera House (1957)	J. J. in Person! (1958)	Really Livin' (1959)

J. J. in Person! is an album recorded "in concert" by the J. J. Johnson Quintet which was released on the Columbia label. This is a studio recording, but some versions of the album, including the original release, feature over-dubbed applause and faked bandstand announcements introducing the songs and performers.

== Reception ==
Professional ratings
Review scores
Source	Rating
Allmusic	3/5 stars

Allmusic awarded the album 3 stars.

== Track listing ==
1. "Tune Up" (Miles Davis) - 5:40
2. "Laura" (David Raksin, Johnny Mercer) - 4:57
3. "Walkin'" (Richard Carpenter) - 6:51
4. "What Is This Thing Called Love?" (Cole Porter) - 6:30
5. "Misterioso" (Thelonious Monk) - 6:57
6. "My Old Flame" (Sam Coslow, Arthur Johnston) - 3:45
7. "Now's The Time" (Charlie Parker) - 8:11

== Personnel ==
- J. J. Johnson – trombone
- Nat Adderley – cornet (tracks 1–5 & 7)
- Tommy Flanagan – piano
- Wilbur Little – bass
- Albert Heath – drums
