= Trombone for Two =

Trombone For Two
- 2007 Mosaic Records edition

Studio album by J.J. Johnson and Kai Winding
- Released: 1956
- Recorded: June 23–24, 1955
- Genre: Jazz
- Length: 35:41
- Label: Columbia
- Producer: George Avakian

Kai Winding chronology
K + J.J. (1955)	Trombone For Two (1956)	Jay and Kai + 6 (1956)

J.J. Johnson chronology
The Eminent Jay Jay Johnson, Vol. 3 (1955)	Trombone for Two (1956)	Jay and Kai + 6 (1956)

Trombone For Two is a 1956 album by jazz trombonists J.J. Johnson and Kai Winding ("Jay and Kai"). It was the first of five albums that Winding and Johnson recorded for Columbia Records (CL 742). George Avakian produced the recording sessions, which took place on June 23 and 24, 1955.

In 2007, Mosaic Records paired the album with Jay and Kai (Columbia CL 973) on one compact disc (MCD-1015), as part of the label's Mosaic Singles series.

== Reception ==
Professional ratings
Review scores
Source	Rating
Allmusic	3/5 stars
The Penguin Guide to Jazz Recordings	3/4 stars

Scott Yanow, writing for allmusic, describes Trombone For Two as "bop–based but full of surprises, tasteful but not always predictable," and gives the album a three-star rating (of a possible five). It was a surprise success in the '50s, when jazz was dominated by piano trios and trumpet and tenor saxophone stars. Jay and Kai crafted well thought out, inventive arrangements that highlighted the blend of their sounds while at the same time setting off their distinctive styles.

== Track listing ==
Side 1

1. "The Whiffenpoof Song" (Minnigerode–Pomeroy–Galloway–Rev: R. Vallée)
2. "Give Me the Simple Life" (Ruby–Bloom)
3. "Close as Pages in a Book" (Fields–Romberg)
4. "Turnabout" (J.J. Johnson)
5. "Trombone for Two" (Kai Winding)

Side 2

6. "It's Sand, Man" (E. Lewis–Arr: K. Winding)
7. "We Two" (J.J. Johnson)
8. "Let's Get Away From It All" (Adair–Dennis)
9. "Goodbye" (Jenkins)
10. "This Can't Be Love" (Rodgers and Hart)

== Personnel ==
- J.J. Johnson – trombone
- Kai Winding – trombone
- Dick Katz – piano
- Paul Chambers – bass
- Osie Johnson – drums
