= Stan Getz and J. J. Johnson at the Opera House =

Live album by Stan Getz
- Released: 1957
- Recorded: September 29 and October 7, 1957
- Venues: Chicago, IL and Los Angeles, CA
- Genre: Jazz
- Length: 38:04 (mono), 35:25 (stereo)
- Label: Verve
- Producer: Norman Granz

Stan Getz chronology
Gerry Mulligan Meets Stan Getz (1957)	Stan Getz and J.J. Johnson at the Opera House (1957)	Cal Tjader-Stan Getz Sextet (1958)

J. J. Johnson chronology
Dial J. J. 5 (1957)	Stan Getz and J.J. Johnson at the Opera House (1957)	J. J. in Person! (1958)

Alternate cover
- Re-issue (Verve V 8490 / V6 8490)

Professional ratings
Review scores
Source	Rating
AllMusic	4.5/5 stars
The Penguin Guide to Jazz Recordings	3/4 stars

Stan Getz and J.J. Johnson at the Opera House is a 1957 live album by Stan Getz and J. J. Johnson. They were accompanied by the Oscar Peterson trio and Connie Kay on drums. Two different versions of the same material, one recorded in Chicago and one recorded in Los Angeles by the same musicians, were released by Verve under the same title. One recording was mono and the other was stereo.

== Multiple releases and misidentified recording dates / locations ==
The original album liner notes apparently misidentified which recording came from which location on which date but later CD re-issue liner notes claim to have the corrected information.

"Note: The liner notes to the compact disc reissue of these titles…(Verve 831-272-2), by jazz historian Phil Schaap corrects the date and location information of this concert recording as listed in the Jespen, Bruyninckx, and Fini discographies".

According to the later CD liner notes, the stereo recording was made at the Civic Opera House in Chicago on September 29, 1957 and the mono recording was made at the Shrine Auditorium in Los Angeles on October 7, 1957.

== Track listing ==
=== Verve MGV 8265 / V 8490 (mono) ===
LP Side A

1. "Billie's Bounce" (Charlie Parker) – 7:57
2. "My Funny Valentine" (Richard Rodgers, Lorenz Hart) – 8:28

LP Side B

1. "Crazy Rhythm" (Irving Caesar, Joseph Meyer, Roger Wolfe Kahn) – 7:47
2. "Yesterdays" (Jerome Kern, Otto Harbach) – 3:42
3. "It Never Entered My Mind" (Rodgers, Hart) – 3:52
4. "Blues In the Closet" (Oscar Pettiford) – 6:18

=== Verve MGVS 6027 / V6 8490 (stereo) ===
LP Side A

1. "Billie's Bounce" (Parker) – 10:15
2. "My Funny Valentine" (Rodgers, Hart) – 7:40

LP Side B

1. "Crazy Rhythm" (Caesar, Meyer, Wolfe Kahn) – 7:36
2. "Yesterdays" (Jerome Kern, Otto Harbach) - 3:38 *
3. "It Never Entered My Mind" (Rodgers, Hart) – 3:46
4. "Blues In the Closet" (Pettiford) – 6:08
- Yesterdays is listed on album back cover and on the vinyl B side but the song is not on the vinyl.

CD re-issues have included all or most tracks from both concerts on a single disc

== Personnel ==
- Stan Getz – tenor saxophone (except "Yesterdays")
- J.J. Johnson – trombone (except "It Never Entered My Mind")
- Oscar Peterson – piano
- Herb Ellis – guitar
- Ray Brown – double bass
- Connie Kay – drums

== See also ==
- The Modern Jazz Quartet and the Oscar Peterson Trio at the Opera House (Verve, 1957)
- Ella Fitzgerald At the Opera House
