= Pinnacles (J. J. Johnson album) =

Studio album by J. J. Johnson
- Released: 1980
- Recorded: September 17–19, 1979
- Studio: Fantasy Studios, Berkeley, CA
- Genre: Jazz
- Length: 38:56
- Label: Milestone; M 9093
- Producer: Ed Michel

J. J. Johnson chronology
Chain Reaction: Yokohama Concert, Vol. 2 (1977)	Pinnacles (1980)	Concepts in Blue (1980)

Pinnacles is an album by jazz trombonist and arranger J. J. Johnson, recorded in 1979 for the Milestone label.

== Reception ==
Professional ratings
Review scores
Source	Rating
AllMusic	3/5 stars
The Penguin Guide to Jazz Recordings	3/4 stars

The AllMusic review by Scott Yanow observed: "Although not quite an essential set, J.J. Johnson is in excellent form on this date". All About Jazz wrote: "This is deep ‘Seventies funk, with block horns and lots of percussion. It’s also pretty generic – these guys are more at home playing jazz, and that’s what they should be playing".

== Track listing ==
All compositions by J. J. Johnson except where noted.

1. "Night Flight" - 7:46
2. "Deak" - 6:26
3. "Cannonball Junction" - 5:32
4. "Pinnacles" - 6:40
5. "See See Rider" (Traditional) - 6:46
6. "Mr. Clean" (Weldon Irvine) - 5:46

== Personnel ==
- J. J. Johnson - trombone, arranger
- Oscar Brashear - trumpet (tracks 2, 3, 5 & 6)
- Joe Henderson - tenor saxophone (tracks 1–4)
- Tommy Flanagan - piano
- Ron Carter - bass
- Billy Higgins - drums
- Kenneth Nash - percussion (tracks 5 & 6)

== Use of Electronic Music Equipment ==
From the liner notes:

"J.J. Johnson uses Barcus-Berry pickup, Gentle Electric pitch follower, and Roland Space Echo on "Cannonball Junction", and the same pickup and pitch follower, plus ARP 2600 Synthesizer and Oberheim Expander Module on "Mr. Clean."
