= The Yokohama Concert =

Live album by J. J. Johnson and Nat Adderley
- Released: 1978
- Recorded: April 20, 1977
- Venue: Kanagawa Kenritsu Ongakudo, Yokohama, Japan
- Genre: Jazz
- Length: 81:03
- Label: Pablo Live; 2620 109
- Producer: Norman Granz

J. J. Johnson chronology
Stonebone (1969)	The Yokohama Concert (1978)	Chain Reaction: Yokohama Concert, Vol. 2 (1977)

The Yokohama Concert is a live album by jazz trombonist J. J. Johnson and trumpeter Nat Adderley recorded in 1977 for the Pablo Live label and originally released as a double LP.

== Reception ==
Professional ratings
Review scores
Source	Rating
Allmusic	3/5 stars
The Penguin Guide to Jazz Recordings	3.5/4 stars

The Allmusic review by Scott Yanow observed "The music is challenging and well-played if not overly exciting, but it did result in J.J. Johnson returning to a much busier schedule as a trombonist again".

== Track listing ==
All compositions by J. J. Johnson except where noted.

1. "Horace" - 6:57
2. "Cyclops" (Nat Adderley) - 6:18
3. "Why Not" - 8:34
4. "Splashes" - 7:18
5. "It Happens" (Tony Dumas) - 10:02
6. "Work Song" (Adderley) - 6:00
7. "Walkin'" (Richard Carpenter) - 9:44
8. "Jevin" - 5:16
9. "Lament" - 3:21
10. "Hummin'" (Adderley) - 8:27
11. "Melodee" - 8:51

== Personnel ==
- J. J. Johnson - trombone, arranger
- Nat Adderley - trumpet
- Billy Childs - piano
- Tony Dumas - bass
- Kevin Johnson - drums
