= J.J.! =

Studio album by J.J. Johnson
- Released: 1965
- Recorded: December 7, 8 & 9, 1964; Webster Hall, New York City
- Genre: Jazz
- Label: RCA Victor; LPM/LSP 3458
- Producer: Jack Somer

J.J. Johnson chronology
Proof Positive (1964)	J.J.! (1965)	Goodies (1965)

J.J.! is an album by jazz trombonist and arranger J.J. Johnson and Big Band recorded in 1964 for the RCA Victor label.

== Reception ==
Professional ratings
Review scores
Source	Rating
Allmusic	4/5 stars

The Allmusic site awarded the album 4 stars.

== Track listing ==
1. "El Camino Real" (J.J. Johnson) – 4:10
2. "Stolen Moments" (Oliver Nelson) – 5:50
3. "Train Samba" (Gary McFarland) – 6:50
4. "Swing Spring" (Miles Davis) – 3:45
5. "Bimsha Swing" (Thelonious Monk, Denzil Best) – 3:10
6. "My Little Suede Shoes" (Charlie Parker) – 4:55
7. "So What" (Davis) – 4:15
8. "Stratusphunk" (George Russell) – 6:50
9. "Winter's Waif" (McFarland) – 5:50
- Recorded at Webster Hall in New York City on December 7, 1964 (tracks 5–8), December 8, 1964 (tracks 2 & 4) and December 9, 1964 (tracks 1, 3 & 9)

== Personnel ==
- J.J. Johnson – trombone, arranger
- Thad Jones (tracks 1–4 & 9), Jimmy Maxwell (tracks 1, 3, & 9), Ernie Royal, Clark Terry (tracks 5–8), Joe Wilder (tracks 1, 3, & 9) – trumpet
- Jimmy Cleveland – trombone
- Tommy Mitchell (tracks 1, 3, & 9), Tony Studd – bass trombone
- James Buffington – French horn (tracks 1, 3 & 9)
- Bill Stanley – tuba (tracks 1, 3 & 9)
- Ray Beckenstein (tracks 2 & 4), Jerry Dodgion, Harvey Estrin (tracks 1, 3, & 9), Bud Johnson (tracks 1, 3, & 9), Oliver Nelson, Jerome Richardson (tracks 5–8) – reeds
- Hank Jones – piano
- Bob Cranshaw – bass
- Grady Tate – drums
