= Chain Reaction: Yokohama Concert, Vol. 2 =

Live album by J. J. Johnson and Nat Adderley
- Released: 2002
- Recorded: April 16 & 20, 1977; Tokyo and Kanagawa Kenritsu Ongakudo, Yokohama, Japan
- Genre: Jazz
- Length: 50:50
- Label: Pablo; 2620-121-2
- Producer: J. J. Johnson

J. J. Johnson chronology
The Yokohama Concert (1977)	Chain Reaction: Yokohama Concert, Vol. 2 (2002)	Pinnacles (1979)

Chain Reaction: Yokohama Concert, Vol. 2 is a live album by jazz trombonist J. J. Johnson and trumpeter Nat Adderley recorded in 1977 for the Pablo Live label and originally released as a CD in 2002.

== Reception ==
Professional ratings
Review scores
Source	Rating
Allmusic	2.5/5 stars
The Penguin Guide to Jazz Recordings	3/4 stars

The Allmusic review by Rick Anderson stated "It is not a perfect album by any means, but it does offer music of significant value. ...Not essential, but far from worthless".

== Track listing ==
1. "Blue 'n' Boogie" (Dizzy Gillespie, Frank Paparelli) - 9:01
2. "Modaji" (Dave Grusin) - 5:55
3. "Song from M*A*S*H (Suicide Is Painless)" (Johnny Mandel, Robert Altman) - 5:06
4. "Colors" (Billy Childs) - 4:48
5. "Chain Reaction" (Joe Sample) - 4:02
6. "Mr. Clean" (Weldon Irvine) - 7:23
7. "Walkin'" (Richard Carpenter) - 7:58
8. "Mohawk" (J. J. Johnson) - 6:34
- Recorded in Tokyo on April 16, 1977 (tracks 4–8) and Yokohama on April 20, 1977 (tracks 1–3)

== Personnel ==
- J. J. Johnson - trombone, arranger
- Nat Adderley - trumpet
- Billy Childs - piano
- Tony Dumas - bass
- Kevin Johnson - drums
