= Blue Trombone =

Studio album by J. J. Johnson
- Released: 1957
- Recorded: April 26, 1957
- Genre: Jazz
- Label: Columbia

J. J. Johnson chronology
First Place (1957)	Blue Trombone (1957)	Dial J. J. 5 (1957)

Professional ratings
Review scores
Source	Rating
AllMusic	4/5 stars

Blue Trombone is an LP by J. J. Johnson. An early example of hard bop, the album features pianist Tommy Flanagan, bassist Paul Chambers and drummer Max Roach. The album was released on Columbia Records in 1957 and was reissued on CD by Tristar in 1994.

== Reception ==
Michael Nastos of AllMusic rated the album four stars and stated: "All of the music is excellent, and shows why Johnson was regarded as the very best jazz trombonist in the bop and post-bop movements."

== Track listing ==
1. Hello, Young Lovers (Richard Rodgers, Oscar Hammerstein II)
2. Kev (J.J. Johnson)
3. What's New (Bob Haggart, Johnny Burke)
4. Blue Trombone (Part 1) (J.J. Johnson)
5. Blue Trombone (Part 2) (J.J. Johnson)
6. Gone with the Wind (Allie Wrubel, Herbert Magidson)
7. 100 Proof (J.J. Johnson)

Tracks 4 and 5 above are two halves of the same studio recording, divided at the beginning of Paul Chambers' bass solo to fit on opposite sides of the original vinyl LP. Some later CD reissues and compilations present the piece as a single track, as listed below.

== Track listing - reissue with bonus tracks ==
1. Hello Young Lovers
2. Kev
3. What's New
4. Blue Trombone
5. Gone With The Wind
6. 100 Proof
7. Our Love Is Here To Stay
8. Portrait Of Jenny
9. Pennies From Heaven
10. Viscosity
11. You're Mine, You
12. Daylie Double
13. Groovin'

== Lineup ==
- J.J. Johnson - trombone
- Tommy Flanagan - piano (tracks 1 - 7)
- Paul Chambers - bass (tracks 1 - 6, 8 - 13)
- Max Roach - drums (tracks 1 - 6)
- Wilbur Little - bass (track 7)
- Elvin Jones - drums (track 7)
- Horace Silver - piano (tracks 8 - 13)
- Kenny Clarke - drums (tracks 8 - 13)
- Hank Mobley - tenor sax (tracks 9 - 13)
