= The Eminent Jay Jay Johnson, Vol. 2 =

Studio album by J. J. Johnson
- Released: 1954
- Recorded: September 24, 1954
- Studio: Van Gelder Studio; Hackensack, New Jersey
- Genre: Jazz
- Label: Blue Note; BLP 5057

J. J. Johnson chronology
Jay and Kai (Savoy) (1954)	The Eminent Jay Jay Johnson, Vol. 2 (1954)	An Afternoon at Birdland (1954)

The Eminent Jay Jay Johnson, Vol. 2 is a ten-inch LP by American jazz trombonist J. J. Johnson recorded on September 24, 1954 and released on Blue Note later that year. Johnson is backed by rhythm section Wynton Kelly, Charles Mingus and Kenny Clarke, and percussionist Sabu Martinez.

== Reception ==
=== Release history ===
This album was originally released as the second of three Jay Jay Johnson albums in Blue Note's 10-inch Modern Jazz 5000 Series (BLP 5057, The Eminent Jay Jay Johnson, Vol. 2). The previous 10 inch LP release was BLP 5028, Jay Jay Johnson with Clifford Brown and the third 10-inch LP release was BLP 5070, The Eminent Jay Jay Johnson, Vol. 3.

== Track listing ==
All tracks are written by J. J. Johnson, except as noted.

Side 1
No.	Title	Writer(s)	Length
1.	"Jay"		3:42
2.	"Time After Time"	Sammy Cahn; Jule Styne	4:13
3.	"Old Devil Moon"	E. Y. Harburg; Burton Lane	3:52

Side 2
No.	Title	Writer(s)	Length
1.	"Too Marvelous for Words"	Johnny Mercer; Richard A. Whiting	3:35
2.	"It's You or No One"	Cahn; Styne	4:06
3.	"Coffee Pot"		4:08

== Personnel ==
=== Musicians ===
- J. J. Johnson – trombone
- Wynton Kelly – piano
- Charles Mingus – bass
- Kenny Clarke – drums
- Sabu Martinez – congas (except "It's You or No One" and "Time After Time")

=== Technical personnel ===
- Alfred Lion – producer
- Rudy Van Gelder – recording engineer
