= First Place (album) =

Studio album by J. J. Johnson
- Released: 1957
- Recorded: April 11–12 & 26, 1957
- Studio: Columbia Studios, Studio A and Columbia 30th Street Studios, NYC
- Genre: Jazz
- Label: Columbia; CL 1030
- Producer: Cal Lampley

J. J. Johnson chronology
J Is for Jazz (1956)	First Place (1957)	Blue Trombone (1957)

First Place is an album by the J. J. Johnson Quartet which was released on the Columbia label.

== Reception ==
Professional ratings
Review scores
Source	Rating
Allmusic	4/5 stars
Disc	5/5 stars

AllMusic awarded the album 4 stars, stating: "Bop is their thing, and Johnson's flawless lines on his trombone were never more in evidence than on this stupendous effort... Johnson's smaller ensemble dates have stood the test of time as perhaps his best ever -- which is debatable, considering all his fine work, but First Place is indisputably brilliant".

== Track listing ==
All music is composed by J. J. Johnson except where noted.

No.	Title	Writer(s)	Length
1.	"It's Only a Paper Moon"	Harold Arlen, Yip Harburg	5:01
2.	"Paul's Pal"	Sonny Rollins	4:04
3.	"For Heaven's Sake"	Elise Bretton, Sherman Edwards, Donald Meyer	3:02
4.	"Commutation"		5:15
5.	"Harvey's House"		2:59
6.	"That Tired Routine Called Love"	Matt Dennis	5:12
7.	"Be My Love"	Nicholas Brodszky, Sammy Cahn	3:00
8.	"Cry Me a River"	Arthur Hamilton	5:51
9.	"Nickels and Dimes"		4:54
Total length:			39:18

- Recorded at Columbia Studios, Studio A, NYC on April 11, 1957 (tracks 2, 3, 5, 6 & 9), April 12, 1957 (tracks 1, 4 & 7) and at Columbia 30th Street Studios, NYC on April 26, 1957 (track 8).

== Personnel ==
- J. J. Johnson – trombone
- Tommy Flanagan – piano
- Paul Chambers – bass
- Max Roach – drums
