= Proof Positive (album) =

Studio album by J. J. Johnson
- Released: 1964
- Recorded: May 1 and July 4, 1964
- Genre: Jazz
- Length: 38:40
- Label: Impulse!
- Producer: Bob Thiele

J. J. Johnson chronology
J.J.'s Broadway (1963)	Proof Positive (1964)	J.J.! (1964)

Proof Positive is a 1964 album by American jazz trombonist J. J. Johnson featuring performances recorded in 1964 for the Impulse! label.

== Reception ==
The Allmusic review by Scott Yanow awarded the album 4½ stars stating "This CD reissue finds trombonist J.J. Johnson in prime form. In fact, his melancholy minor-toned explorations often recall Miles Davis, whose group he had played with the year before".

Professional ratings
Review scores
Source	Rating
Allmusic	4.5/5 stars
Record Mirror	3/5 stars

== Track listing ==
LP Side 'A'

1. "Neo" (Miles Davis) – 10:19
2. "Lullaby Of Jazzland" (Manny Albam, Rick Ward) – 5:08
3. "Stella By Starlight" (Ned Washington, Victor Young) – 4:02

LP Side 'B'

1. "Minor Blues" (J.J. Johnson) – 8:04
2. "My Funny Valentine" (Lorenz Hart, Richard Rodgers) – 3:02
3. "Blues Waltz" (Max Roach) – 8:05

Bonus track on CD re-issue

"Gloria" (Bronislaw Kaper) – 3:04

all tracks recorded in New York City on May 1, 1964 except "Lullaby Of Jazzland" recorded at Rudy Van Gelder Studio in Englewood Cliffs, New Jersey around July 4, 1964

== Personnel ==
- J. J. Johnson – trombone
- Harold Mabern – piano
- Arthur Harper, Jr. – bass
- Frank Gant – drums

"Lullaby Of Jazzland":

- J.J. Johnson – trombone
- McCoy Tyner – piano
- Richard Davis – bass
- Elvin Jones – drums
- Toots Thielemans – guitar
