= J Is for Jazz =

Studio album by The J. J. Johnson Quintet
- Released: 1956
- Recorded: July 24–25 & 27, 1956
- Studio: Columbia 30th Street Studios, NYC
- Genre: Jazz
- Label: Columbia; CL 935
- Producer: Cal Lampley

J. J. Johnson chronology
Jay and Kai (1956)	J Is for Jazz (1956)	First Place (1957)

J Is for Jazz is an album by the J. J. Johnson Quintet which was released on the Columbia label.

== Reception ==
Professional ratings
Review scores
Source	Rating
AllMusic	3/5 stars
DownBeat	3.5/5 stars

AllMusic awarded the album 3 stars.

== Track listing ==
All compositions by J. J. Johnson except where noted.

1. "Naptown U.S.A." - 4:59
2. "It Might as Well Be Spring" (Richard Rodgers, Oscar Hammerstein II) - 4:46
3. "Tumbling Tumbleweeds" (Bob Nolan) - 4:14
4. "Angel Eyes" (Matt Dennis Earl Brent) - 3:35
5. "Solar" (Miles Davis) - 5:14
6. "Overdrive" - 3:22
7. "Undecided" (Charlie Shavers, Sid Robin) - 4:04
8. "Never Let Me Go" (Ray Evans, Jay Livingston) - 3:40
9. "Chasin' the Bird" (Charlie Parker) - 4:40
10. "Cube Steak" - 3:41
- Recorded at Columbia 30th Street Studios, NYC on July 24, 1956 (tracks 4, 6 & 7), July 25, 1956 (tracks 3, 5, 8 & 10) and July 27, 1956 (tracks 1, 2 & 9)

== Personnel ==
- J. J. Johnson – trombone
- Bobby Jaspar – tenor saxophone, flute
- Tommy Flanagan (tracks 1, 2 & 9), Hank Jones (tracks 3–8 & 10) – piano
- Percy Heath (tracks 4, 6 & 7), Wilbur Little (tracks 1–3, 5 & 8–10) – bass
- Elvin Jones – drums
