= Jay Jay Johnson with Clifford Brown =

Studio album by J. J. Johnson
- Released: 1953
- Recorded: June 22, 1953
- Genre: Jazz
- Length: 25:32
- Label: Blue Note; BLP 5028

J. J. Johnson chronology
Jazz South Pacific (1952)	Jay Jay Johnson with Clifford Brown (1953)	Jay and Kai (Savoy) (1954)

Jay Jay Johnson, also known as Jay Jay Johnson with Clifford Brown, is a 10" album by the Jay Jay Johnson Sextet, recorded on June 22, 1953 and released on Blue Note later that year. The sextet features brass section Clifford Brown and Jimmy Heath, and rhythm section John Lewis, Percy Heath, Kenny Clarke.

== Background ==
The album was re-issued on CD in 1989 as The Eminent Jay Jay Johnson, Volume 1, with three alternate take 'bonus tacks' from the same 1953 recording session. Five of the six original tracks were included also in a 1955 12 inch LP re-issue/compilation (also) titled, The Eminent Jay Jay Johnson, Volume 1.

== Reception ==
The Penguin Guide to Jazz called the album "one of the central documents of post-war jazz".

AllMusic's Scott Yanow commented, "Although Johnson has a couple of features, Clifford Brown largely steals the show".

== Track listing ==
Side 1
No.	Title	Writer(s)	Length
1.	"Get Happy"	Harold Arlen, Ted Koehler	4:47
2.	"Lover Man"	Jimmy Davis; Ram Ramirez; James Sherman	3:50
3.	"Capri"	Gigi Gryce	3:37

Side 2
No.	Title	Writer(s)	Length
1.	"Sketch 1"	John Lewis	4:21
2.	"Turnpike"	J. J. Johnson	4:15
3.	"It Could Happen to You"	Johnny Burke; Jimmy Van Heusen	4:42

== Personnel ==
=== Jay Jay Johnson Sextet ===
- J.J. Johnson – trombone
- Clifford Brown – trumpet (except "It Could Happen to You")
- Jimmy Heath – tenor and baritone saxophones (except "It Could Happen to You")
- John Lewis – piano
- Percy Heath – bass
- Kenny Clarke – drums
