= Frederick Lowe =

Australian cricketer

Personal information
- Born: 7 September 1827; Holme Pierrepont, Nottinghamshire, England
- Died: 15 October 1887 (aged 60); Ararat, Victoria, Australia

Domestic team information
- Years: Team
- 1856: Victoria
- Source: Cricinfo, 13 February 2015

Frederick Lowe (7 September 1827 – 15 October 1887) was an Australian cricketer. He played one first-class cricket match for Victoria in 1856.

== See also ==
- List of Victoria first-class cricketers
