= J. J. Johnson =

American jazz trombonist, composer, and arranger (1924–2001)

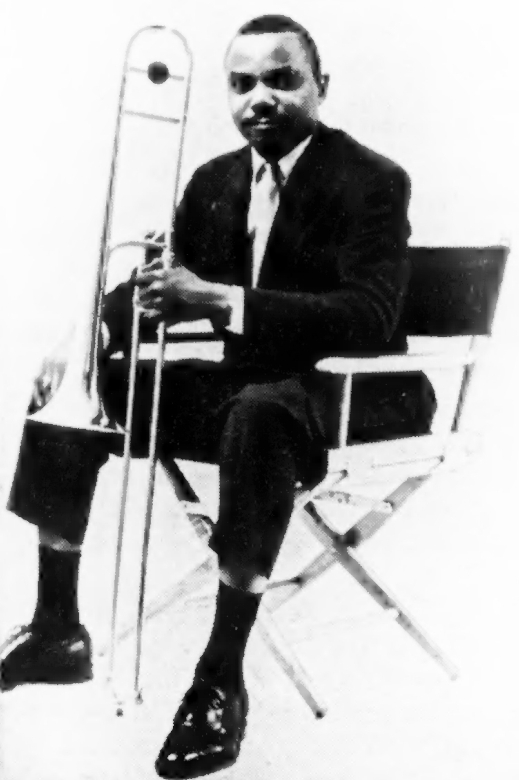
- Johnson in a 1961 DownBeat advertisement

Background information
- Also known as: Jay Jay Johnson
- Born: James Louis Johnson; January 22, 1924; Indianapolis, Indiana, U.S.
- Died: February 4, 2001 (aged 77) Indianapolis, Indiana, U.S.
- Genres: Jazz; bebop; hard bop; third stream
- Occupations: Musician; composer
- Instrument: Trombone
- Years active: 1942–1996
- Labels: Blue Note; Savoy; Columbia; Verve; Impulse!; Milestone; Pablo
- Formerly of: Count Basie Orchestra; Jay and Kai Quintet

J. J. Johnson (January 22, 1924 – February 4, 2001), born James Louis Johnson and also known as Jay Jay Johnson, was an American jazz trombonist, composer, and arranger.

Johnson was one of the earliest trombonists to embrace bebop.

== Biography ==
=== Big bands ===
After studying the piano beginning at age 9, Johnson decided to play trombone at the age of 14. In 1941, he began his professional career with Clarence Love and then played with Snookum Russell in 1942. In Russell's band, he met the trumpeter Fats Navarro, who influenced him to play in the style of the tenor saxophonist Lester Young. Johnson played in Benny Carter's orchestra between 1942 and 1945, and made his first recordings in 1943 under Carter's leadership, recording his first solo (on "Love for Sale") in October 1943. In 1944, he took part in the first Jazz at the Philharmonic concert, presented in Los Angeles and organized by Norman Granz. In 1945, he joined the big band of Count Basie, touring and recording with him until 1946.

=== Bebop ===
While the trombone was featured prominently in Dixieland and swing music, it fell out of favor among bebop musicians, largely because instruments with valves and keys (trumpet, saxophone) were believed to be more suited to bebop's often rapid tempos and demand for technical mastery. In 1946, bebop co-founder Dizzy Gillespie encouraged the young trombonist's development: "I've always known that the trombone could be played different, that somebody'd catch on one of these days. Man, you're elected."

After leaving Basie in 1946 to play in small bebop bands in New York clubs, Johnson toured in 1947 with Illinois Jacquet. During this period, he also began recording as a leader of small groups featuring Max Roach, Sonny Stitt, and Bud Powell. He performed with Charlie Parker at the December 17, 1947, Dial Records session, following Parker's release from Camarillo State Mental Hospital.

In 1951, with bassist Oscar Pettiford and trumpeter Howard McGhee, Johnson toured the military camps of Japan and Korea, before returning to the United States and taking a day job as a blueprint inspector. Johnson admitted later he was still thinking of nothing but music during that time, and indeed, his Blue Note recordings as both a leader and with Miles Davis date from this period. Johnson's compositions "Enigma" and "Kelo" were recorded by Davis for Blue Note, and Johnson was part of the Davis studio session band that recorded the jazz standard "Walkin'" in 1954 (the title track of a Davis album issued by Prestige).

=== Jay and Kai ===
In 1954, producer Ozzie Cadena, then with Savoy Records, convinced Johnson to set up a combo with trombonist Kai Winding—the "Jay and Kai Quintet". The trombone styles and personalities of the two musicians, although very different, blended so well that the pairing, which lasted until August 1956, was a success both musically and commercially. They toured U.S. nightclubs and recorded numerous albums. The duo reunited again in 1958 for a tour of the UK, an Impulse! studio album in 1960, and, in 1968–1969 (two albums for CTI/A&M Records). In January 1967, Johnson and Winding were in an all-star line-up (alongside the likes of Clark Terry, Charlie Shavers, and Joe Newman) backing Sarah Vaughan on her last sessions for Mercury Records, released as the album Sassy Swings Again, with three of the cuts, including Billy Strayhorn's "Take the 'A' Train", being arranged by Johnson himself. The duo also made some jazz festival appearances in Japan in the early 1980s, the last shortly before Winding died in May 1983.

=== Solo career ===
Following the mid-1950s collaboration with Winding, J. J. Johnson began leading his own touring small groups for about three years, covering the United States, the United Kingdom, and Scandinavia. These groups (ranging from quartets to sextets) included tenor saxophonists Bobby Jaspar and Clifford Jordan, cornetist Nat Adderley, trumpeter Freddie Hubbard, pianists Tommy Flanagan and Cedar Walton, and drummers Elvin Jones, Albert "Tootie" Heath, and Max Roach. In 1957, he recorded the quartet albums First Place and Blue Trombone, with Flanagan, Paul Chambers, and Roach. He also toured with the Jazz at the Philharmonic show in 1957 and 1960, the first tour yielding a live album, featuring Johnson and tenor saxophonist Stan Getz. In 1958–59, Johnson was one of three plaintiffs in a court case which hastened the abolition of the cabaret card system.

This period overlaps with the beginnings of Johnson's serious forays into third stream music (see below). Periods of writing and recording his music would alternate with tours, demanding attention to his playing.

Following the six months he spent writing Perceptions (see below), Johnson entered the studio for a date with André Previn's trio (adding Johnson as the only horn). They recorded an entire album of the music of Kurt Weill, released as André Previn and J. J. Johnson Play 'Mack The Knife' and Other Kurt Weill Songs. In 1962, Johnson toured for a number of months with Davis's sextet of that year, which went unrecorded.

Johnson's 1963 album J. J.'s Broadway is an example of both his mature trombone style and sound, and his arranging abilities. Johnson's album Proof Positive (1964) was the last recording of his working band for over 20 years. Beginning in 1965, Johnson recorded a number of large group studio albums under his name, featuring many of his own compositions and arrangements. The late 1960s saw a radical downturn in the fortunes of many jazz musicians, and Johnson was consequently heard almost exclusively on big band-style studio records, usually backing a single soloist.

=== Composer ===
From the mid-1950s, but especially the early 1960s on, Johnson dedicated more and more time to composition. He became an active contributor to the Third Stream movement in jazz, (which included such other musicians as Gunther Schuller and John Lewis), and wrote large-scale works which incorporated elements of both classical music and jazz. He contributed his "Poem for Brass" to a Third Stream compilation titled Music for Brass in 1957, and composed a number of original works which were performed at the Monterey Jazz Festival in the late 1950s and early 1960s. In 1961, he composed a suite in six movements, titled Perceptions, with Gillespie as soloist. The First International Jazz Festival, held in Washington, D.C., in 1962, featured another extended work. In 1965, he spent time in Vienna to perform and record his Euro Suite with a jazz-classical fusion orchestra led by Friedrich Gulda. In 1968, a Johnson work titled "Diversions" was commissioned by the American Wind Symphony and performed.

=== Hollywood ===
Johnson moved to California to compose for cinema and television. During this period, he played almost no concerts, except in 1977 and 1982 in Japan, and in 1984 in Europe. Despite the low profile, he did record six albums as a leader between 1977 and 1984 (including a 1984 trombone duo album with Al Grey) and a few albums as a sideman, two with Basie, and on The Sting II soundtrack. During the California period, he also played in the Cocoanut Grove orchestra of Sammy Davis Jr. and the TV orchestra of Carol Burnett.

=== Return to performing ===
Johnson returned to performing and recording in November 1987, with an engagement at the Village Vanguard in New York City. Tours of the United States, Europe, and Japan followed, as well as a return engagement to the Vanguard in July 1988, which yielded two albums' worth of material.

While touring Japan in December 1988, Johnson learned that his wife Vivian had suffered a bad stroke, which incapacitated her for the remaining three and a half years of her life. During this period, Johnson cancelled all work, devoting his energy to caring for his ailing wife. After her death in 1991, he dedicated an album to her on Concord Records.

In 1992, Johnson married his second wife, Carolyn Reid, and he began actively performing once again. Following this second comeback in 1992, Johnson's contracts with a variety of record labels, including Verve and Antilles, resulted in five albums as a leader, from small groups to separate brass orchestra and string orchestra recordings, as well as sideman appearances with his leading disciple, trombonist Steve Turre, and the vocalist Abbey Lincoln. He earned several Grammy nominations during this period. He retired from active performing and touring in late 1996, after having performed his last concert at William Paterson College on November 10, 1996, then choosing to stay at his home in Indianapolis, where he could indulge his passion for composing and arranging music with computers and MIDI.

Later diagnosed with prostate cancer, Johnson maintained a positive outlook and underwent treatment. He wrote a book of original exercises and études for jazz musicians, published later by Hal Leonard. A biography, titled The Musical World of J. J. Johnson, was published in 2000.

On February 4, 2001, he died by a self-inflicted gunshot wound. His funeral in Indianapolis drew jazz musicians, friends, and family from around the country.

== Influence ==
Johnson's work in the 1940s and 1950s demonstrated that the slide trombone could be played in the bebop style; as trombonist Steve Turre has summarized, "J. J. did for the trombone what Charlie Parker did for the saxophone. And all of us that are playing today wouldn't be playing the way we're playing if it wasn't for what he did. And not only, of course, is he the master of the trombone—the definitive master of this century—but, as a composer and arranger, he is in the top shelf as well."

Several of Johnson's compositions, including "Wee Dot", "Lament", and "Enigma" have become jazz standards.

From the mid-1950s onwards, Johnson was a perennial polling favorite in jazz circles, even winning "Trombonist of the Year" in DownBeat magazine during years he was not active. He was voted into the DownBeat Hall of Fame in 1995.

== Bibliography ==
- Berrett, Joshua; Bourgois, Louis G. (December 18, 2001). The Musical World of J. J. Johnson. Rowman & Littlefield. ISBN 978-0-81-084247-2.
- Johnson, J. J. (February 1, 2002). Exercises and Etudes for the Jazz Instrumentalist by J. J. Johnson. Hal Leonard Corporation. ISBN 978-0-63-402865-6.
