= Nature Boy =

1948 song by eden ahbez, sung by Nat King Cole

Single by Nat King Cole

from the album The Nat King Cole Story
- A-side: Lost April
- Released: March 29, 1948
- Recorded: August 22, 1947
- Studio: Capitol Studios, 5515 Melrose Ave, Hollywood
- Genre: Jazz; pop
- Length: 2:56
- Label: Capitol
- Songwriter: eden ahbez

Nat King Cole singles chronology
"Route 66" (1946)	"Nature Boy" (1948)	"Mona Lisa" (1950)

Audio video
- "Nature Boy" on YouTube

"Nature Boy" is a song first recorded by American jazz singer Nat King Cole. It was released on March 29, 1948, as a single by Capitol Records, and later appeared on the 1961 album The Nat King Cole Story. It was written by eden ahbez as a tribute to Bill Pester, who practiced the Naturmensch and Lebensreform philosophies adopted by Ahbez. The lyrics of the song relate to a 1940s Los Angeles–based group called "Nature Boys", a subculture of proto-hippies of which Ahbez was a member.

"Nature Boy" was released during the American Federation of Musicians (AFM) ban of 1948. It reached the top of the Billboard music charts and sold over a million copies, helping to establish Cole's solo career, and introducing him to the white music market. "Nature Boy" was the subject of lawsuits, with Yiddish composer Herman Yablokoff claiming that it was plagiarized from his song "Shvayg mayn harts" (שװײג מײן האַרץ, "Be Still My Heart"). Eventually, Ahbez and Yablokoff settled out of court. In 1999, the song was awarded the Grammy Hall of Fame Award.

Following Cole's success, rival record companies released cover versions of "Nature Boy" by other artists including Frank Sinatra and Sarah Vaughan, which were also successful. It ultimately became a pop and jazz standard, with many artists interpreting the song, including Tony Bennett and Lady Gaga, who recorded it for their collaborative album Cheek to Cheek (2014). It was also used in numerous films like The Boy with Green Hair (1948) Untamed Heart (1993), which uses Nat King Cole version and Roger William's piano version, The Talented Mr. Ripley (1999), the 2001 musical Moulin Rouge!, for which singer David Bowie recorded a version, and in the television series Resident Alien.

== Background and development ==
In 1941, a 33-year-old George McGrew arrived in Los Angeles and began playing piano in the Eutropheon, a small health food store and raw food restaurant on Laurel Canyon Boulevard. The café was owned by John and Vera Richter, who followed a Naturmensch (nature person) and Lebensreform (life reform) philosophy influenced by the Wandervogel (Wandering Bird) movement in Germany. Their followers, known as "Nature Boys", wore long hair and beards and ate only raw fruits and vegetables. McGrew adopted the philosophy and chose the name "eden ahbez", writing and spelling his name with lower-case letters. It was there, while living in a cave near Palm Springs, that ahbez wrote "Nature Boy". Partly autobiographical, the song was a tribute to his mentor Bill Pester, who had originally introduced him to Naturmensch and Lebensreform.

In 1947, at the prompting of Cowboy Jack Patton and Johnny Mercer, ahbez approached Nat King Cole's manager backstage at the Lincoln Theater in Los Angeles, handed him a tattered copy of "Nature Boy", and asked him to show it to Cole. However, his pleas were ignored and a disappointed ahbez left the sheet music of "Nature Boy" with Cole's valet, Otis Pollard. From him, Cole learned of the song and loved it. Cole began playing "Nature Boy" for live audiences, and received much acclaim. Irving Berlin, who was present during one of the performances, offered to buy the track from Cole, but Cole decided to record it himself. He needed permission from ahbez, however, before releasing it as a single, but he was unable to find the songwriter since ahbez had disappeared without providing any contact details. After ahbez was discovered living under the Hollywood Sign, Cole got his permission.

== Recording and composition ==
"Nature Boy" (1961 re-recording)
An 18-second sample from Cole's 1961 version of "Nature Boy". It begins with the opening lyrics, "There was a boy, A very strange, enchanted boy", which is backed by Frank De Vol's string arrangement and flute instrumentation.

Cole's recording, which took place on August 22, 1947, featured an orchestra conducted by Frank De Vol—the in-house arranger of Capitol Records. He used strings and flute as instrumentation in the song, to capture the "enchanting" vibe of the track. The first two measures of the song's melody parallel the melody of the second movement in composer Antonín Dvořák's Piano Quintet No. 2 (1887). Written as a pop ballad, "Nature Boy" follows an "A,B" format, with the primary three notes descending on a minor triad above the pickup note.

An ascending line over the diminished ii chord returns to the initial minor triad. The song's melody is built around a simple, descending pattern in the key of D minor, creating a haunting and reflective mood. Its harmonic structure frequently uses the standard ii–V–I progression, supporting the melody's emotional depth. The second 4-bar section featured a chromatic descending line based on the lowering of the tonic (Dm–Dm_{maj7}–Dm_{7}–Dm_{6}). The same descending line then continues through Gm_{6}–Dm, then finally ending with a whole-step down to the G in the chord Em_{7}♭_{5}.

Instrumentalist Chris Tyle noted that the lyrics are a musical self-portrait of ahbez, with the lines like "There was a boy, A very strange, enchanted boy, They say he wandered very far, Very far, over land and sea". But he believed that it was the song's last line that made it the most poignant: "The greatest thing you'll ever learn, Is just to love and be loved in return". Various interpretations of the line are given by academics, with the eponymous nature boy being a child, advising on love and relationship, or an adult hippie talking about his journey and inner-love. According to author Jeffery P. Dennis, the song presented a homo-romantic theme, with the eponymous nature boy visiting Cole on a "magic day" and explaining that "the greatest thing you'll ever learn, is just to love and be loved in return". Author Raymond Knapp described the track as a "mystically charged vagabond song" whose lyrics evoked an intense sense of loss and haplessness, with the final line delivering a universal truth, described by Knapp as "indestructible" and "salvaged somehow from the perilous journey of life".

According to Joe Romersa, an engineer/drummer in Los Angeles, to whom ahbez bequeathed master tapes, photos, and final works, ahbez wanted a correction made to the lyrics, saying "'To be loved in return,' is too much of a deal, and there's no deal in love,", and that instead it should read "The greatest thing you'll ever learn is to love and be loved, just to love, and be loved." Romersa has stated that, because these lyrics did not fit with the original ending melody, ahbez re-wrote it.

== Release and reception ==
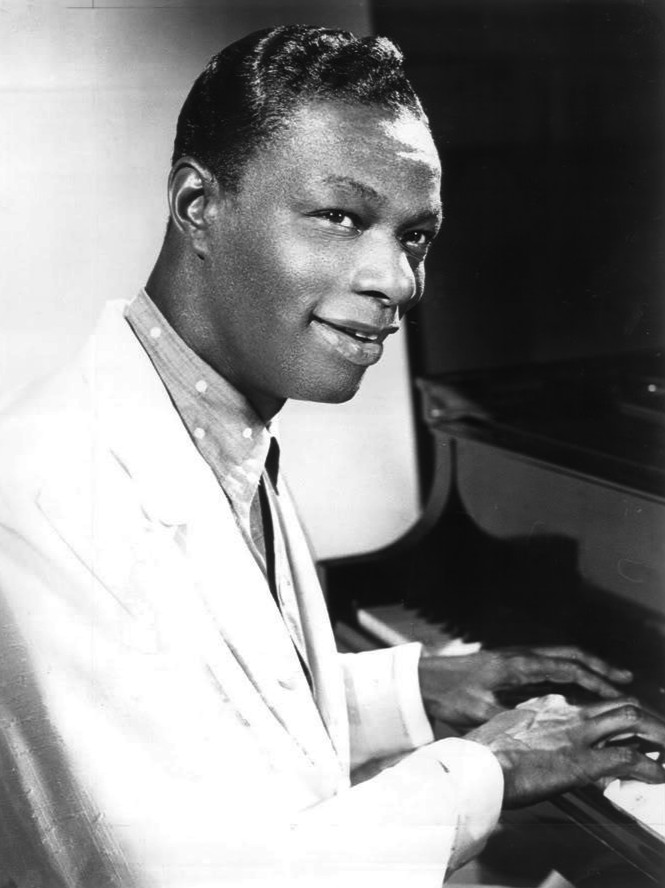
"Nature Boy" helped Nat King Cole to further popularize his singing career, and made him reach the white audience.

In 1948, a second "Petrillo ban" on music recording was enforced by American Federation of Musicians (AFM) in response to the Taft–Hartley Act. Capitol Records, desperate to release recorded material to help sustain profitability during the strike, released "Nature Boy" as a single on March 29, 1948, with catalog number 15054. Crestview Music, which owned the publishing rights to Cole's songs, sold the rights for "Nature Boy" to Burke-Van Heusen, who acted as distributor and selling agent. The record debuted on the Billboard pop charts of April 16, 1948, and stayed there for 15 weeks, ultimately peaking at number one. It also reached a peak of number two on the R&B charts. "Nature Boy" went on to sell a million copies in 1948 and Billboard DJs listed it as the greatest record of the year, with the song accumulating a total of 743 points.

The 1940s American music market was divided by race, and for a black artist to cross over to mainstream pop music was difficult. Author Krin Gabbard noted in his book, Jammin' at the Margins: Jazz and the American Cinema, that Cole had to wear white makeup while filming for the performance of the song. Although he had come into prominence in 1940 as a leader of the jazz trio named King Cole Trio, it was with "Nature Boy" that he received widespread recognition, and it was his rendition that appealed to the white audience.

Cole would later use the success of the song to disband the trio in order to pursue a solo recording career. He once described "Nature Boy" as one of his favorite recordings. The success of the song allowed ahbez to accumulate about US$20,000 ($268,006 in 2025 dollars) in royalties. However, Billboard reported that ahbez kept only 50% of the royalty for himself, and distributed the rest among people who had helped bring the song into the limelight. About 25% was shared with Mrs. Loraine Tatum for helping him with the lyrics, and the rest with Pollard, for bringing the song to Cole's notice. Basil R.T Mumma, a pianist in Chicago made important contributions to the song as well.

"Nature Boy" has received wide acclaim from critics and contemporary reviewers. Author Ted Gioia noted in his book, The Jazz Standards: A Guide to the Repertoire, that all the musicians "who had created the golden age of American popular song had their quirks and idiosyncrasies, but eden ahbez demands pride and place as the most eccentric of them all". He added that, along with promoting the hippie culture, with "Nature Boy", ahbez and Cole were able to introduce a new era for black artists in white popular music.

In his book, Sinatra! the Song is You: A Singer's Art, author Will Friedwald complimented Cole's version, saying that it had been the "startingly fresh" combination of the singer's vocals along with the string section, which had made "Nature Boy" a hit. Stephen Cook from AllMusic said that the song transformed Cole into "one of the most famous and beloved pop singing stars of the postwar years". Billboard noted that such was the popularity of the song that audiences would only stay in theaters to see Cole perform "Nature Boy", and leave once he finished.

A 1975 poll by the magazine listed it as the "Greatest All-Round Record" as well as the "Favorite Pop Recording" of the previous years. In 1999, the song was awarded the Grammy Hall of Fame, a special Grammy Award established in 1973 to honor recordings that are at least twenty-five years old and that have "qualitative or historical significance". Novelist Steve Erickson in Los Angeles magazine gave a detailed positive review of the song:

"Nature Boy" is so otherworldly in its melody and lyric that any number of interpretations over the decades, from Nat Cole's to Alex Chilton's, have never been able to make it ordinary. It sounds like something that, from the minute it was written, existed out of time and place—all thousand and one Arabian Nights compressed into two and a half minutes as mediated by a cracked Mojave Debussy slugging down the last of the absinthe from his canteen.

Yiddish theatre composer Herman Yablokoff claimed in his biography, Memoirs of the Yiddish Stage, that the melody to "Nature Boy" was plagiarized from his song "Shvayg mayn harts" ("Hush My Heart"), which he wrote for his play Papirosn (1935). When met with a lawsuit in 1951 for the plagiarization, ahbez first proclaimed his innocence, and telephoned Yablokoff to explain that he "had heard the melody as if angels were singing it... in the California mountains. He offered me $10,000 to withdraw the suit. I said that the money was not important, but I wanted him to admit that the song was geganvet [stolen]; and if he heard angels, they must have bought a copy of my song." Eventually ahbez's lawyers offered to have an out-of-court settlement, offering $25,000 ($310,096 in 2025 dollars) to Yablokoff, which he accepted. Freidwald remarked that "it struck no one as ironic that a song with message of love and peace should come to symbolize how cutthroat the pop music business was becoming".

In June 2026, CBS News included the song in its list of the 250 essential American songs of the past 250 years.

== Other versions ==
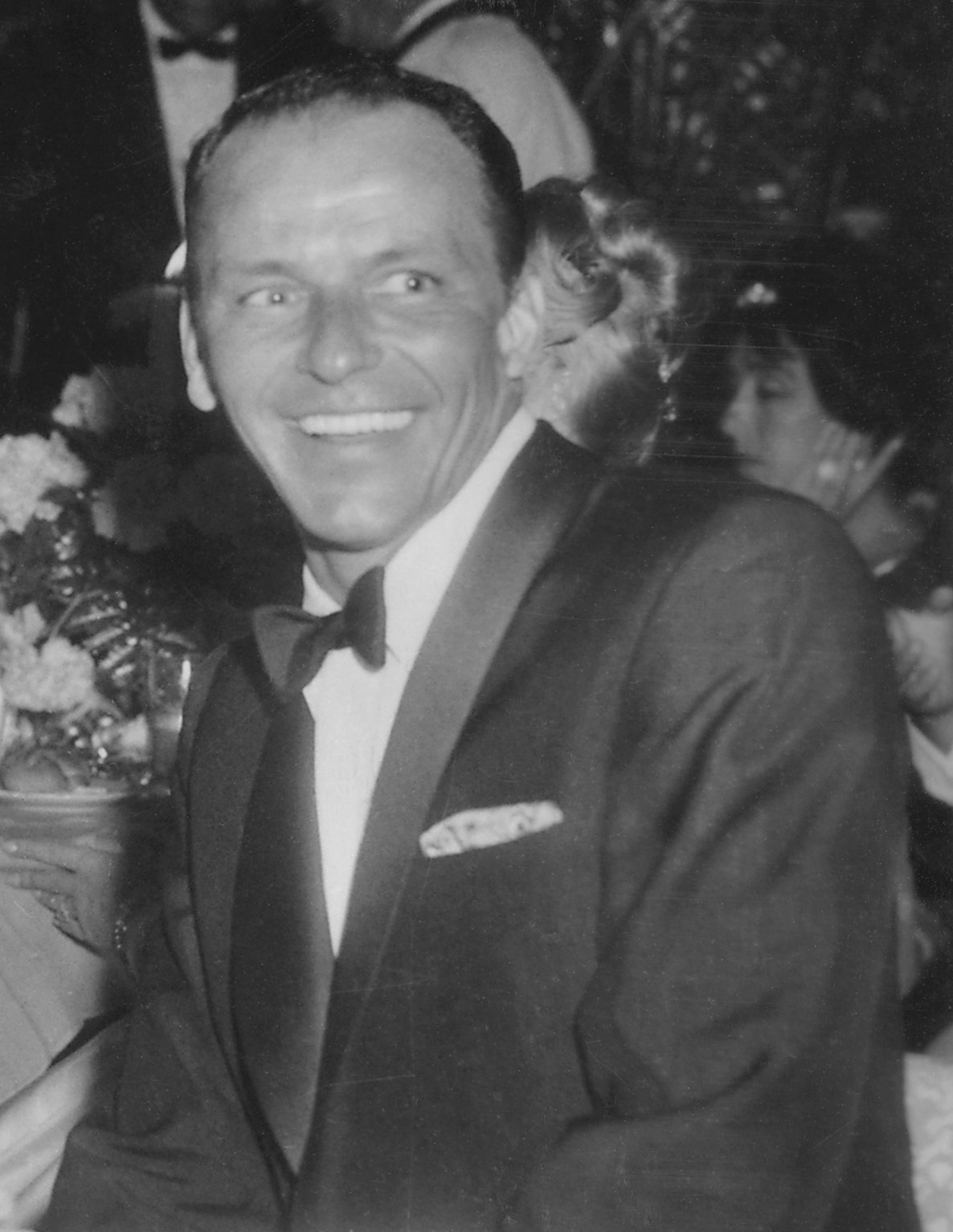
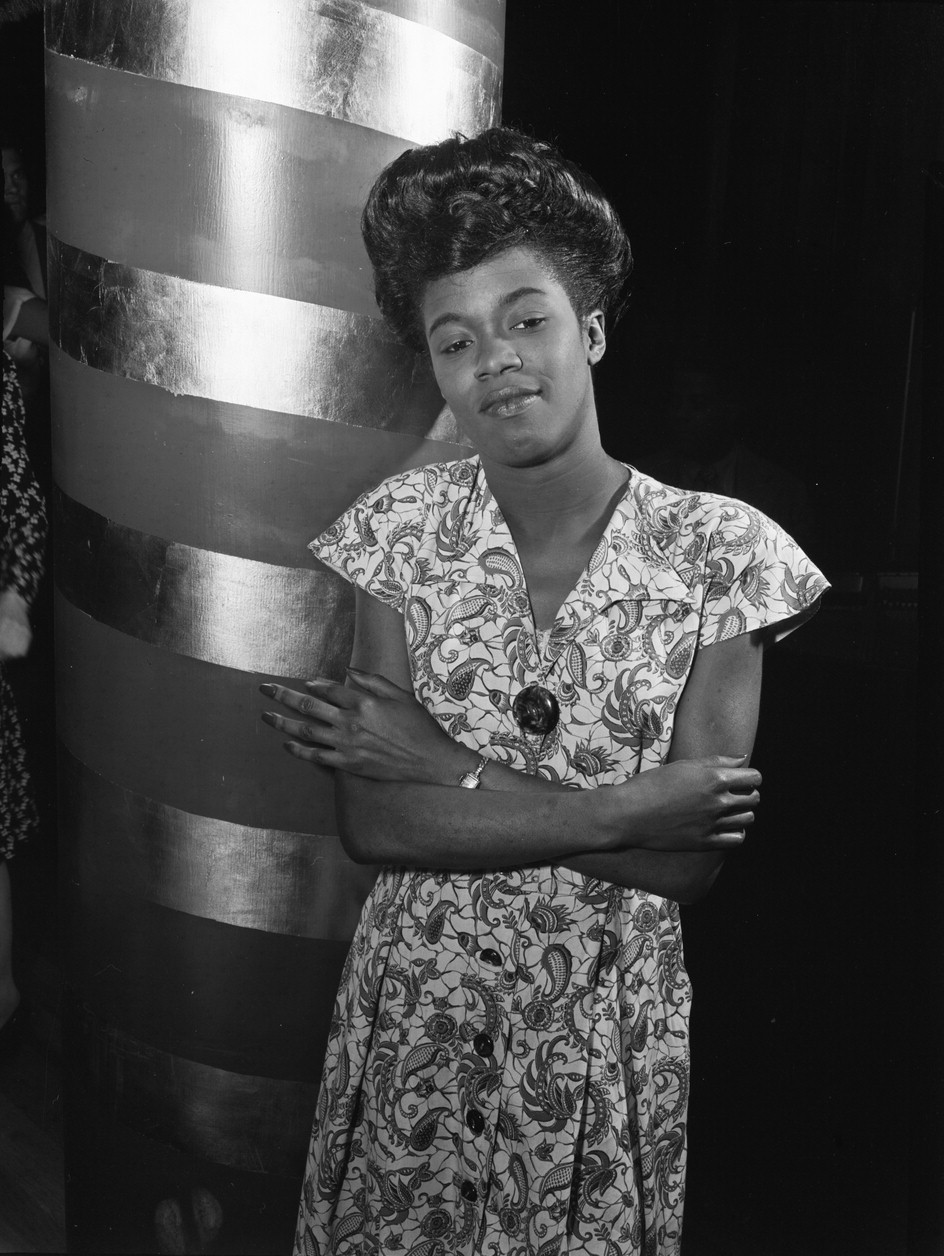
Other popular versions of the song were released by Frank Sinatra (left) and Sarah Vaughan (right).

The success of "Nature Boy" soon led to the release of a number of cover versions of the track. However, due to the AFM ban, other record companies could not release full versions with strings, only a cappella tracks. Following Cole's version of "Nature Boy", the Dick Haymes recording was released by Decca Records as catalog number 24439. The record first appeared on the Billboard charts on June 4, 1948, and peaked at number 11.

Frank Sinatra also recorded a musicianless version, which was his only recording during the ban. Sinatra's version of "Nature Boy" replaced the string sounds of the original recording with a choir conducted by Jeff Alexander, which, according to Friedwald, made the song sound like a Gregorian chant. The recording was released by Columbia Records as catalog number 38210. It debuted on the Billboard charts on May 28, 1948, and peaked at number seven.

Sinatra later performed the song on the radio show, Your Hit Parade, accompanied by a choir and orchestral arrangement. RCA Records planned to release versions by singers Perry Como and Bing Crosby, but they were subsequently cancelled due to the ban. Musicraft Records released Sarah Vaughan's a cappella version on April 8, 1948. It was a commercial success, selling 20,000 copies on the first day and peaking at number 11 on the Billboard chart.

A parody named "Serutan Yob" was recorded by The Unnatural Seven, an offshoot of Red Ingle and his Natural Seven that did not include Ingle due to the 1948 AFM recording ban. "Serutan Yob" featured vocals from Karen Tedder and Los Angeles DJ Jim Hawthorne. It was released by Capitol with catalog number 15210, reached the Billboard charts on October 1, 1948, and stayed there for a total of four weeks, peaking at number 24.

In 1955, Miles Davis recorded the song with Charles Mingus as bassist. The recording for the song was filled with tension due to an ongoing conflict between Davis and Mingus, resulting in a charged version of the song. They were assisted by Teddy Charles on vibraphone and Elvin Jones on drums. Another version was recorded by singer Bobby Darin, released in 1961 reaching number 14 in Canada and number 24 on the UK singles chart. A psychedelic rock version was recorded in 1965 by 1960s San Francisco rock band The Great Society, with lead vocals from singer Grace Slick, released on their 1968 post-breakup album How it Was. The same year, Marvin Gaye recorded and released his version on the Cole tribute album, A Tribute to the Great Nat King Cole.

A version by George Benson reached number 26 in the UK singles chart in 1977 and in 1983 soul band Central Line reached number 21.

Peggy Lee's version of "Nature Boy" was recorded in 1948, but released in 1995 as part of the compilation album, Why Don't You Do Right? Peggy Lee, 1947–1948. Johnny Hartman made a 1972 recording that was included on Blue Note's 1995 album For Trane. Abbey Lincoln recorded a version of the song for her 1995 album A Turtle's Dream. Howard Reich from the Chicago Tribune was impressed with the cover saying that "the mood of reverie and awe [that Lincoln] expresses in 'Nature Boy' epitomize this album's haunting appeal."

Natalie Cole, the daughter of Nat "King" Cole, paid tribute to her father by recording her version of "Nature Boy" for inclusion on an entire album of songs that had been, according to Alex Henderson from AllMusic, "major hits for him in the 1940s and early '50s." That album, Natalie Cole's Unforgettable... with Love, won several Grammy Awards in 1991 including Record of the Year and Album of the Year at the 34th Annual Grammy Awards.

Celine Dion performed the song as part of her A New Day... concert at Caesars Palace. The song appeared on her 2002 studio album, A New Day Has Come, and on her 2004 live album, A New Day... Live in Las Vegas. Stephen Thomas Erlewine from AllMusic said that the decision to include "Nature Boy" in A New Day Has Come was inspired by the song's appearance in Baz Luhrmann's musical, Moulin Rouge! (2001). With Billboard, Dion expressed her feelings while recording the track: "This is the one I had the most kick out of in the studio. I could hear the pedal of the piano and the touch of the keys while I was singing. We were following each other, this is the real thing. This was such my pleasure." Initially strings and other instrumentation were added in post-production, but were later removed to maintain the simplicity of Cole's version.

Aaron Neville's interpretation of the track was released in 2003 on his jazz standard album, titled Nature Boy: The Jazz Album. That year in December, Harry Connick, Jr. released a holiday themed rendition of "Nature Boy", on his holiday album, Harry for the Holidays. On the tenth season of American Idol, contestant Casey Abrams presented a jazz version of the song, which was received with a standing ovation from the audience, but faced criticism from the media for the "strange" musical arrangements.

Rick Astley covered this song for his sixth studio album Portrait in 2005. Unfortunately, Astley and Sony BMG were unhappy with the result so the album was poorly promoted, yet it managed to reach No 26 on the UK Albums Chart. In 2010, Allison Williams, then mostly known as the daughter of Brian Williams, performed a mashup of Nature Boy set to RJD2's "A Beautiful Mine", the theme song for the television series Mad Men. Norwegian singer Aurora performed an acoustic version of the song during a live session in May 2015. Her cover was later included as a bonus track on the deluxe edition of her debut album All My Demons Greeting Me as a Friend, released in 2016.

Sofia Hoffmann recorded her interpretation for "Nature Boy" on her second studio album Rebirth which was released in 2022. The song was produced by Grammy Award winning American pianist, arranger and producer John Beasley.

=== Tony Bennett and Lady Gaga version ===
"Nature Boy"

Promotional single by Tony Bennett and Lady Gaga

from the album Cheek to Cheek
- Released: September 16, 2014
- Studio: KAS Music and Sound (Astoria, NY); Kaufman Astoria Studios (Astoria, NY); Manhattan Center Studios (New York, NY); Avatar Studios (New York, NY)
- Length: 4:08
- Label: Columbia; Interscope
- Songwriter: eden ahbez
- Producer: Dae Bennett

Audio video
- "Nature Boy" on YouTube

After recording the jazz standard "The Lady Is a Tramp", American singer Tony Bennett and Lady Gaga began working on a collaborative jazz album, titled Cheek to Cheek. The recording took place over a year in New York City, and featured jazz musicians associated with both artists. Bennett's quartet was present, including Mike Renzi, Gray Sargent, Harold Jones and Marshall Wood as well as pianist Tom Lanier. Along with Evans, jazz trumpeter Brian Newman, a long-time friend and colleague of Gaga, played on the album with his New York City based jazz quintet. Tenor saxophonist Joe Lovano and flutist Paul Horn were also enlisted as musicians.

The songs were handpicked by Bennett and Gaga; they selected tracks from the Great American Songbook including "Nature Boy". It features instrumentation from flutes and drums, and has an orchestral arrangement. According to Kory Grow of Rolling Stone, Gaga sings in a Liza Minnelli inspired voice with a breathy range, followed by Bennett complimenting her with the story of meeting the titular character.

"Nature Boy" was released for streaming on Gaga's Vevo channel from September 16, 2014. Preceding the release, Gaga tweeted about the background of the song, about the death of flutist Horn, as well as about ahbez, saying "This composer was part of a sub-culture of nomadic hippies! We channeled our own Gypsy lives in this performance". Gil Kaufman from MTV News gave a positive review, saying that "This song sounds like what you imagine a smoky jazz club in 1940s New York would feel like." Grow praised it as "sublime", describing the track as a "loungier" version Gaga and Bennett's collaboration.

Dave Lewis from HitFix believed that the "magic" of the song really happened once Bennett's vocals were heard, following Gaga's singing and the orchestration. Lewis said that "It's not exactly 'Do What You Want with My Body', but Gaga and Bennett generate a different kind of heat." Caroline Sullivan of The Guardian said that the song was "treated with the greatest delicacy". He praised the flute sounds and the contrast between Gaga's "vulnerable" vocals and Bennett's "assured" one. Alexa Camp from Slant Magazine gave a negative review, saying that her timbre in "Nature Boy" appeared inconsistent, "shifting from soft and almost pleasant to parodic and comical, often within just a few short bars". "Nature Boy" reached number 22 on the Billboard Jazz Digital Songs chart. In Russia, it peaked at number 259 on the official Tophit airplay chart.

== Usage in films ==
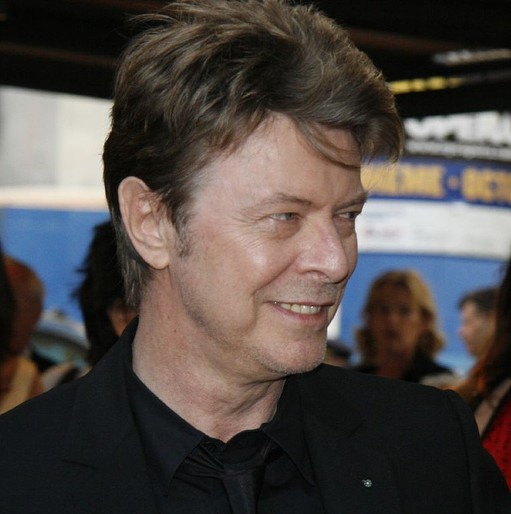
Singer David Bowie's version in Moulin Rouge! was critically appreciated.

The song was a primary theme of the film score for The Boy with Green Hair (1948), for which the original version was used. The producers of the film reportedly paid $10,000 to ahbez for using the song, which was cumulatively more than what the author of the story, Betsy Beaton, was paid. A recording by Kate Ceberano with an orchestral arrangement by Derek Williams was featured in the film The Crossing (1990). The tune and lyrics feature prominently in the film Untamed Heart (1993), for which Cole's version was used during the closing credits, while a piano version by Roger Williams served as the opener for the film. The song was also played in intermediate scenes featuring the principal cast.

Miles Davis' recording of "Nature Boy" was used in the film The Talented Mr. Ripley (1999). In the book Music, Movies, Meanings, and Markets: Cinemajazzamatazz, author Morris Holbrook described the song as a "nondiegetic performance", exemplifying the plot development and sexual tension in the scene featuring Tom Ripley (Matt Damon) and Dickie Greenleaf (Jude Law) playing chess, naked, and later in a bathtub scene. The song is performed at a jazz club in the film Angel Eyes, (2001). A version recorded by Jon Hassell on trumpet and Ronu Majumdar on flute is featured on the soundtrack. The writing of "Nature Boy" was the theme of a 2000 Canadian TV film of the same title, directed by Kari Skogland. Callum Keith Rennie played ahbez, writing the song for Cole, played by Terence Carson, after falling in love with a woman named Anna Jacobs, portrayed by Tanya Allen.

The song was a central theme in Luhrmann's Moulin Rouge! "Nature Boy" was initially arranged as a techno song with singer David Bowie's vocals, before being sent to the group Massive Attack, whose remix was used in the film's closing credits. Bowie described the rendition as "slinky and mysterious", adding that Robert "3D" Del Naja from the group had "put together a riveting piece of work", and that Bowie was "totally pleased with the end result". Both Bowie's version and Massive Attack's remix appeared on the soundtrack.

The version used in Moulin Rouge! was sung by John Leguizamo, as Henri de Toulouse-Lautrec, during the introductory scenes, as well as by Ewan McGregor's character, Christian. Some of the film's premise was based on the lyrics, in particular the opening lines. The closing lyric, "The greatest thing you'll ever learn is just to love and be loved in return" is used throughout the film. While reviewing Moulin Rouge!, Erickson noted that "[by] itself, ['Nature Boy'] redeems the wonderful idea behind Luhrmann's flawed but often wonderful movie."

The song was performed by Heleno de Freitas (Rodrigo Santoro) in the film Heleno (2012), during a radio interview scene where he asks if he could sing a song for his wife and son. Cole's version was again played at the start of Mike Tyson's one-man show, Mike Tyson: Undisputed Truth, directed by Spike Lee that aired on HBO. On December 25, 2016, 20th Century Fox released a teaser trailer for the British-American science-fiction horror film, Alien: Covenant, using a cover of "Nature Boy" by singer Aurora, as the background score. It was also used during the title credits of Netflix's The Andy Warhol Diaries.

== See also ==
- List of 1940s jazz standards
- List of Billboard number-one singles of 1948
- List of Grammy Hall of Fame Award recipients (J–P)
- List of songs recorded by Celine Dion
- List of songs recorded by Frank Sinatra
- List of songs recorded by Harry Connick, Jr.
