= Jazz standard (disambiguation) =

Jazz standards refer to musical compositions by jazz musicians that are an important part of the musical repertoire of jazz musicians. They can also refer to:

- Jazz Standard (jazz club), defunct jazz club in New York City
- Great Jazz Standards, 1958 album by composer Gil Evans
- Jazz Standards (Mark Murphy album), a 1998 album by Mark Murphy
- The Jazz Standards: A Guide to the Repertoire, 2012 book by Ted Gioia

== See also ==
- List of jazz standards (disambiguation)
