= Baubles, Bangles, & Beads =

Show tune from the 1953 musical "Kismet"

"Baubles, Bangles, & Beads" is a popular song from the 1953 musical Kismet, credited to Robert Wright and George Forrest. It is based on the second movement from string quartet nr.2 in D major, "Scherzo. Allegro" by Russian composer Alexander Borodin.

== Background ==
Like almost all the music in that show, the melody was based on works by Alexander Borodin, in this case the second theme of the second movement of his String Quartet in D. The "Kismet" setting maintains the original's 3/4 waltz rhythm; pop music settings change the rhythm to a moderate four-beat accompaniment. Jazz musicians are especially drawn to the song's beguiling melody and advanced harmonic structure. The familiar AA'BA+Coda structure of the song is energized by a key change up a major third interval for every section; the transition is marked by a harmonic progression from the central major key of one section to the tritone minor key of the following section.

== 1953 recordings ==
The best-selling version of the song was recorded by Peggy Lee on September 16, 1953 and charted briefly that year. Other versions were recorded that year by Lu Ann Simms and Georgia Gibbs.

== Kirby Stone Four recording ==
- The Kirby Stone Four re-make hit No. 25 in the Billboard Top 100 in 1958.

== Other recordings ==
The song has appeared on numerous albums over the years including:

- Gerry Mulligan - Recorded in Boston at Storyville (1956)
- Wes Montgomery - Fingerpickin' (1957)
- Lena Horne - Give the Lady What She Wants (1958)
- Eydie Gorme - Gorme Sings Showstoppers (1958)
- Frank Sinatra - Come Dance with Me! (1959), Francis Albert Sinatra & Antônio Carlos Jobim (1967)
- Kay Starr - Movin' on Broadway (1960)
- June Christy - The Cool School (1960)
- Sarah Vaughan - You're Mine You (1962)
- Oscar Peterson Trio - Affinity (1962)
- Chet Atkins - Travelin' (1963)
- Johnny Mathis - So Nice (1966)
- Sylvia Telles - The Face I Love (1966)
- Dionne Warwick - On Stage and in the Movies (1967)
- Argentine composer Ernesto Acher mixed the scherzo of Borodin's string quartet with this piece of music, under the name "Borodin, Bangles & Beads" in 1987 on his album Juegos
- Sofia Hoffmann - Rebirth (2022)
