= Rebirth (Sofia Hoffmann album) =

Studio album by Sofia Hoffmann
- Released: June 23, 2022
- Recorded: 2021
- Studio: Estudio Vale de Lobos (Almargem do Bispo)
- Genre: Jazz Standards Pop Indian classical music
- Length: 54:47
- Producer: John Beasley

Sofia Hoffmann chronology
One Soul (2019)	Rebirth (2022)

Singles from Rebirth
- 1. "Esperarei" Released: March 19, 2021; 2. "Nunca Me Esqueci de Ti" Released: May 6, 2022; 3. "Rebirth, Heart From the Truth" Released: May 20, 2022

Rebirth is the second studio album by Portuguese singer-songwriter Sofia Hoffmann. It was released on June 23, 2022,

The album was produced by Grammy award winning American pianist, arranger and producer John Beasley. The original songs for the album were written during the pandemic in 2020, and the album being recorded in 2021, initially recorded remotely due to COVID 19 pandemic restrictions for international travel.

== Background ==
The album first started taking shape when Hoffmann started writing the song "Esperarei" in 2020 during the COVID 19 pandemic. The song reflects upon how lovers who don't live in the same place deal with the distance when the world is forced into separation. It's a message of hope and determination, a love story in a time of war. So just breathe. A new day will come.

When Hoffmann decided to record the song, it had to be recorded remotely due to international travel restrictions. Hoffmann recorded at Rui Veloso's Estudio Vale de Lobos outside Sintra, Portugal, while John Beasley recorded and produced remotely from Los Angeles, and sitarist Gaurav Mazumdar, performed in New Delhi. After travel restrictions had lifted, Beasley then traveled to Portugal to work with Hoffmann in the studio, followed by sitarist Arjun Verma, son of Acharya Roop Verma who was also a disciple of Ravi Shankar and Ali Akbar Khan.

== Release and promotion ==
The first single, "Esperarei", was released on March 19, 2021, before the rest of the album was finished being recorded. The single immediately gained traction with support from the Lisbon jazz radio station, Smooth FM.

The second single, "Nunca Me Esqueci de Ti" was written by Rui Veloso, and João Morge. It was included on the album not only because it is a huge song in Portugal, but also because of its message. The song's meaning resonated with Hoffmann in her adolescence, and also today. This single was also Hoffmann's first single to break onto radio in the United States.

The third single is the second original song from the album, and co-written between Hoffmann and Beasley. The song, "Rebirth, Heart from the Truth" was written in English because she says it comes out naturally for her. She learned English, works in English, and automatically thinks in English, despite being fluent in five languages.

The complete album was released on June 23, 2022, and on September 10, 2022 she performed her first show of the album at Casino Estoril.

== Track listing ==
No.	Title	Writer(s)	Length
1.	"Nunca Me Esqueci De Ti"	Rui Veloso, João Morge	5:03
2.	"Rebirth, Heart from the Truth"	Sofia Hoffmann, John Beasley	5:12
3.	"Baubles, Bangels, and Beads"	Alexander Borodin, George Forrest, Robert Wright	3:54
4.	"Milagre (duet with Rui Veloso)"	Dorival Caymmi	4:36
5.	"Yeh Jo Des Hai Tera"	A.R. Rahman	6:14
6.	"Raag Manj Khammaj"	Roop Verma	4:02
7.	"Nature Boy"	eden albez	5:58
8.	"Esperarei"	Sofia Hoffmann	4:28
9.	"Both Sides Now"	Joni Mitchell	6:09
10.	"All Blues"	Miles Davis	5:03
11.	"Saraswati Mantra"	Gaurav Mazumdar	4:01

== Personnel ==
Adapted from the album liner notes.

- Sofia Hoffmann – vocals, sitar
- John Beasley – producer, arranger, piano, synthesizers, programmed percussion
- Arjun Verma – sitar, vocals, co-arranger
- Alexandre Manaia – acoustic guitar, electric guitar
- Joel Silva – drums, percussion
- Carlos Barreto – upright bass
- Nuni Oliveira – electric bass
- Gurdian Rayatt – tabla
- Ana Cláudia Serrão – cello
- Luis Guerreiro – Portuguese guitar
- Diogo Duque – trumpet
- João Abelhai – backing vocals
- Rashid Niyazi – tabla
- Carlos Manuel Proença – viola, acoustic guitar
- Rão Kyao – Bansuri flute
- Rui Veloso – vocals
- Gaurav Mazumdar – sitar
