= Delores Winters =

Dolores Winters

Publication information
- Publisher: DC Comics
- First appearance: Action Comics #20 (January 1940)
- Created by: Jerry Siegel; Joe Shuster

In-story information
- Species: Metahuman
- Abilities: Cryokinesis; Business management; Acting skills

Dolores Winters is a DC Comics character. Initially, her main role in DC Universe history has been as a body occupied by the Ultra-Humanite in the 1940s, but she has made more significant appearances in current continuity.

Dolores Winters appears in the third and final season of The CW network television series Stargirl, portrayed by Meredith Garretson.

== Fictional character biography ==
Delores Winters is an actress who was kidnapped by the Ultra-Humanite and had his brain surgically implanted into her body, effectively killing her original mind. The Ultra-Humanite, posing as Winters, claims to be retiring and takes a group of celebrities hostage, asking for a ransom of $5,000,000. Superman rescues the hostages, though Ultra-Humanite escapes.

Ultra-Humanite, a fan of Winters prior to her treatment of her, preserves her brain and seeks a new body for her. He ends up transplanting her brain into an unnamed person who had recently died from suicide. Winters undergoes a series of reconstructive surgeries to heal her body.

Some time during the 2000s, Winters has Icemaiden captured and flayed alive, transplanting Icemaiden's skin onto her body. This transplant gives Winters the ability to generate ice, similar to Icemaiden. Icemaiden survives and is placed, comatose, into a hydration womb. By the 2000s, Winters operates a clinic that specializes in cosmetic surgeries, calling herself Endless Winter. Covertly, she works with Roulette, who organizes fights between superhumans. The losers of the fights are given over to Winters and have their body parts taken and implanted into clients.

Winters's clinic is infiltrated by Doctor Mid-Nite. In the ensuing fight, the clinic is damaged when Winters loses control of her powers. Winters's right arm is snapped off, but she manages to escape.

Some time later, Winters travels to Gotham City and attacks Batwoman. After she is defeated, Winters suddenly collapses and dies from an unknown cause. Her corpse is taken by the Justice League; it is revealed that Winters was forced by Prometheus to attack Batwoman in order to distract her from his true goal.

== Powers and abilities ==
Dolores Winters was originally a normal human with no powers. She later received a skin graft from the heroine Icemaiden and gained the ability to manipulate moisture and temperature, which she can create ice or cold.

== Other versions ==
A separate character named Dolores Winters appeared as the girlfriend of Lex Luthor in post-Crisis continuity.

== In other media ==
Dolores Winters appears in the Stargirl episode "Frenemies: Chapter Twelve: The Last Will and Testament of Sylvester Pemberton", portrayed by Meredith Garretson.
