= Meredith Garretson =

American actress

- Garretson at Dragon Con in 2026
- Occupation: Actress
- Years active: 2011–present

Meredith Garretson is an American actress. She is known for her role as Kate Hawthorne in the SyFy/USA Network television series Resident Alien (2021–2025).

== Early life ==
Raised in Alexandria, Virginia, Garretson attended James Madison University, where she studied photojournalism in addition to taking pre-med, anthropology and Spanish classes before she began focusing on becoming an actress. After graduating, she relocated to New York City, where she studied the Meisner technique at Maggie Flanigan Studio. She graduated from New York University Tisch School of the Arts with an MFA in 2017.

== Career ==
Garretson would take on guest roles in episodes of The Good Fight, Fosse/Verdon and Prodigal Son before beginning a recurring role in the Syfy series Resident Alien. In July 2021, Garretson was cast to portray Ali MacGraw in the Paramount+ miniseries The Offer. In 2022, she guest starred in Stargirl.

== Personal life ==
In theatre, Garretson is a co-founder of Society Theatre.

== Filmography ==
=== Film ===
Year	Title	Role	Notes
2024	Friendship	Bianca	

=== Television ===
Year	Title	Role	Notes
2018	The Good Fight	Reese	1 episode
2018	Elementary	Lydia Winchell	1 episode
2019	Fosse/Verdon	Bridget	Miniseries, 1 episode
2019–2020	Prodigal Son	Kimberley	2 episodes
2021–2025	Resident Alien	Kate Hawthorne	Recurring role, 44 episodes
2022	The Offer	Ali MacGraw	Miniseries, 7 episodes
2022	Stargirl	Delores Winters	1 episode
2022	New Amsterdam	Tennessee Kay	1 episode
2024	Chicago Med	Tessa Dunn	1 episode
