= John Beasley (musician) =

American jazz pianist (born 1958)

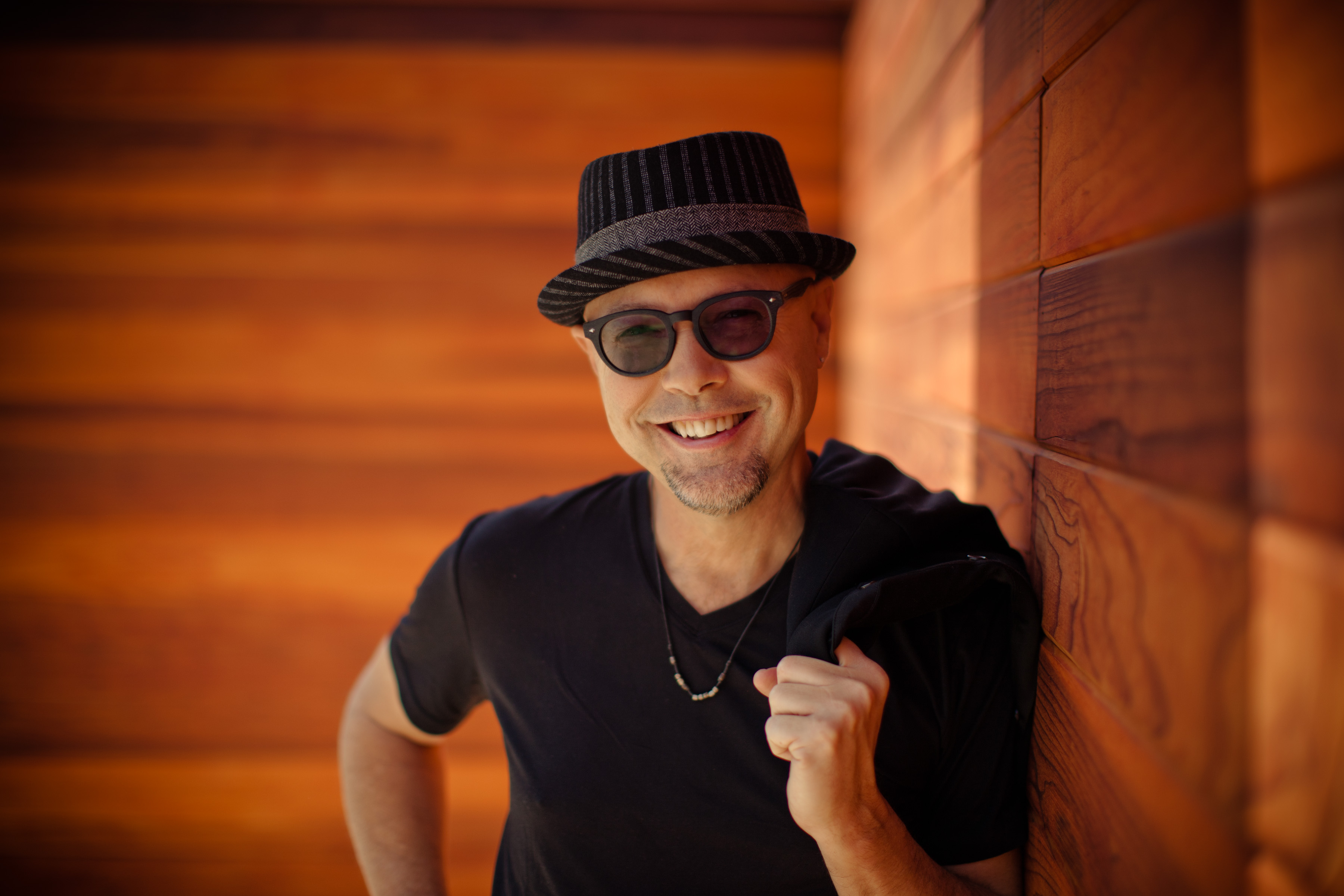

Background information
- Born: John Rule Beasley; October 10, 1958 (age 67); Shreveport, Louisiana, U.S.
- Genres: Jazz
- Occupation: Musician
- Instruments: Piano, keyboards
- Years active: 1980–present
- Labels: Windham Hill, Resonance, Mack Avenue Records
- Website: johnbeasleymusic.com

John Rule Beasley (born October 10, 1958), better known as John Beasley, is a jazz pianist, bandleader, and producer of music for film and television.

== Career ==
He was born in Shreveport, Louisiana, and grew up in Texas in a family of musicians.

His grandfather, Rule Oliver was a trombonist for 50 years and a junior high school band director in Arkansas. His father, Rule Curtis Beasley, was a music educator who in 1963 won 1st prize in Composition at the Southeastern Composers League in Tuscaloosa, Alabama. His mother Lida Beasley was a brass instrumentalist who was a band director and conducted operas and taught music in various public schools and colleges.

He approached music at the age of eight by studying piano, but in his teens, he played guitar, drums, saxophone, trumpet and oboe.

Returning to piano and jazz, at the age of twenty he performed his first major concert at Carnegie Hall with Hubert Laws, John Patitucci and the drummer Joey Heredia.

During the 1970s, he performed jazz and R&B in Los Angeles. He toured with Sergio Mendes, then worked as a studio musician. For several years he was a member of band led by Freddie Hubbard. In 1992 his debut album Cauldron, produced by Walter Becker, was released by Windham Hill.

== Discography (partial) ==
=== Soloist ===
- 1992 - Cauldron (Windham Hill, 01934 10134-2)
- 1993 - A Change of Heart (Windham Hill, 01934 10145 2)
- 2001 - Surfacing (EWE Records, EWCD 2002)
- 2005 - One Live Night (John Beasley, 17528–56)
- 2008 - Letter to Herbie (Resonance, RCD-1003)
- 2009 - Positootly! (Resonance, RCD-1013)
- 2016 - John Beasley Presents MONK'estra Vol. 1 (Mack Avenue, MAC1113)
- 2017 - John Beasley Presents MONK'estra Vol. 2 (Mack Avenue, MAC1125)
- 2020 - MONK'estra Plays John Beasley (Mack Avenue, MAC1172)

=== Soundtracks ===
- 1993 - Mose the Fireman, with Walter Becker and Michael Keaton (Rabbit Ears Productions, 74041-70748-2)

=== Collaborations ===
- 2013 - Gianfranco Continenza, Dusting the Time (Videoradio, VRCD 000844)
- 2022 - Sofia Hoffmann, Rebirth

=== Music director, TV shows ===
- 2005 - American Idol (multi-platinum Carrie Underwood victory in 2005 as associate music director), FOX
- 2005 - Carly Simon A Moonlight Serenade aboard Queen Mary, PBS
- 2007 - Search for the Next Pussycat Dolls, CW
- 2012 - Duets with John Legend, Kelly Clarkson, Robin Thicke, Jennifer Nettles, ABC
- 2014 - Sports Illustrated Swimsuit: 50 Years of Beautiful, NBC
- 2014 - Sing Your Face Off, ABC
- 2015 - 2016 - American Idol, FOX
- 2016 - Jazz at the White House (Emmy nomination for best music direction), ABC
- 2017 - International Jazz Day in Cuba, BET

== Awards ==
John Beasley has been nominated for 8 Grammy Awards and won 1.

Pianist John Beasley won the 2021 Best Arrangement, Instrumental Or A Cappella Grammy Award on March 14, 2021, for his arrangement of Donna Lee performed by his big band, MONK'estra, from the album MONK'estra Plays John Beasley, on Mack Avenue Records. He was nominated for a total of four Grammy Awards in 2021.
