= Resident Alien (TV series) =

American television series, 2021–2025

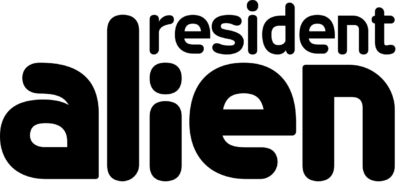
- Genre: Comedy-drama; Mystery; Science fiction
- Created by: Chris Sheridan
- Based on: Resident Alien by: Peter Hogan; Steve Parkhouse
- Starring: Alan Tudyk; Sara Tomko; Corey Reynolds; Alice Wetterlund; Levi Fiehler; Judah Prehn; Elizabeth Bowen; Meredith Garretson
- Opening theme: "Bilgewater" by Brown Bird
- Country of origin: United States
- Original language: English
- No. of seasons: 4
- No. of episodes: 44

Production
- Executive producers: Chris Sheridan; Mike Richardson; Keith Goldberg; Justin Falvey; Darryl Frank; David Dobkin; Robert Duncan McNeill; Cherry Chevapravatdumrong
- Producer: Alan Tudyk
- Production locations: Delta, British Columbia, Canada
- Running time: 43–46 minutes
- Production companies: Jocko Productions; Amblin Television; Dark Horse Entertainment; Universal Content Productions

Original release
- Network: Syfy
- Release: January 27, 2021 – August 8, 2025
- Network: USA Network
- Release: June 6 – August 8, 2025

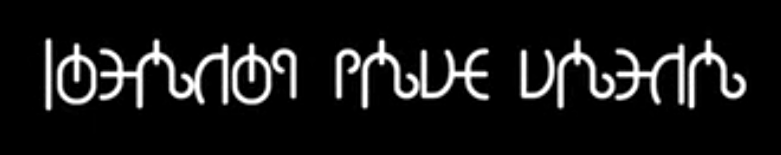
The alien language as seen in the series, which is actually Esperanto written in an invented right-to-left script. This phrase in season 1, episode 1 translates to "four months ago" (antaŭ kvar monatoj).

Resident Alien is an American science fiction comedy-drama television series created by Chris Sheridan, based on the comic book by Peter Hogan and Steve Parkhouse, that aired for four seasons from January 2021 to August 2025 on Syfy. It stars Alan Tudyk in the title role as an extraterrestrial who crash-lands on Earth with the intent to destroy the planet but develops a moral dilemma. In July 2025, it was confirmed that the fourth season would be its last.

== Premise ==
After crash-landing on Earth in a small Colorado town, an extraterrestrial sent to wipe out humanity kills a vacationing physician and takes on his identity. He is asked to do an autopsy on the town's doctor, who has died in unknown circumstances, and eventually takes over for the doctor at the town's clinic. He wrestles with the moral dilemma of his secret mission, while also dealing with the mayor's young son, who can see his true alien appearance. He develops compassion for humanity and ends up defending them from other extraterrestrial threats.

== Cast and characters ==
=== Main ===
- Alan Tudyk as "Harry Vanderspeigle", the titular alien with an unpronounceable birth name who has crash-landed in Patience, Colorado, killed the real Dr. Harry Vanderspeigle, and assumed his identity. He has been sent to Earth to destroy the human race, believing that this would benefit the planet, but he begins to question the morality of his mission after involuntarily forming human emotions. He is fascinated by humans and has learned how to speak English, as well as how to masquerade as a medical examiner from watching reruns of Law & Order. Although he attempts to blend in with people, he consistently stands out because of his misunderstanding of social cues and awkward speech and behavior. As the series progresses, he learns more about human emotions, behavior, and interactions, often closing episodes with a narration about what he has learned. He possesses superhuman strength, durability, and agility as well as advanced intelligence, shapeshifting abilities, and the power to alter or remove human memories. In the second-season finale, Harry is implied to be millions of years old, as he recalls seeing live dinosaurs.
  - Tudyk also portrays the real Dr. Harry Vanderspeigle (seasons 1–2), a corrupt doctor and assassin involved with a crime syndicate who killed the previous town doctor, Sam Hodges
  - Stuntman Keith Arbuthnot portrayed the alien for the first season while in his true form: an androgynous humanoid Octopodiform-like being. For the second season onwards, Tudyk performed the alien scenes using a practical effects-created mask.
  - David Bianchi portrays Goliath (recurring season 2), Harry's future self, who traveled back in time and claimed a new human form as his own to save humanity from destruction. Goliath's artwork was created by Joe Vaux, storyboard artist and animation director for the TV show Family Guy.
- Sara Tomko as Asta Twelvetrees, the assistant to the town doctor at the Patience health clinic and a member of the Ute Native nation. In high school, she had an abusive relationship with classmate Jimmy and placed their daughter Jay for adoption. She is the first person after Max to discover Harry's true identity.
  - Brylee Smith (guest season 1) and Zara Bacic (guest season 2) portray young Asta in flashbacks
- Corey Reynolds as Sheriff Mike Thompson, the town's sheriff, who refers to himself by the nickname "Big Black". He masks his insecurities by trying to control every situation. His career as a police officer in Washington, D.C., ended as a result of the death of his partner, leading him to eventually move to Patience. He also looks after Cletus, his former partner's pet and the town's police dog.
- Alice Wetterlund as D'arcy Bloom, bartender at the town pub, a local mountaineering expert, and Asta's best friend. After a skiing accident at the Olympics, she returned to her hometown and now spends her days tending bar and making questionable life choices. She discovers Harry's true identity after learning that the real Harry killed Sam Hodges.
  - Elle Rivas (guest seasons 2–3) and Olga Petsa (guest season 4) portray young D'arcy in flashbacks
- Levi Fiehler as Ben Hawthorne, the town's young mayor. While he is charming and people-pleasing, his wife Kate tends to dominate their relationship. He previously dated D'arcy in junior high and high school, although they still seem interested in each other. He is a hobbyist candlemaker, but his work goes unappreciated. Since childhood, he has been regularly abducted by Grey aliens.
  - Lukas Goas (guest seasons 2, 4) and Jude Wylie (guest season 3) portray young Ben in flashbacks
- Judah Prehn as Max Hawthorne, Ben and Kate's son, the only resident of Patience who can see through Harry's human disguise. Max is also able to see the "green glow" that is emitted by Harry's alien technology. Harry at first repeatedly threatens to kill Max, then plots to get him to move away; eventually, they reach a truce but continue trading insults.
- Elizabeth Bowen as Deputy Olivia "Liv" Baker (seasons 2–4; recurring season 1), the town's only deputy, who works with Sheriff Mike. She is underappreciated and ignored by the sheriff, although he gradually learns to appreciate her over time. After she briefly quits the force, Sheriff Mike, with some help, comes to recognize her skills, and the two begin to work together more in harmony. She has been fascinated by the possibility of extraterrestrials existing since she was a child, when she witnessed what appeared to be a UFO.
  - Jessica Halliburton (guest season 2) and Camme Clarke (guest season 4) portray young Liv in flashbacks
- Meredith Garretson as Kate Hawthorne (season 4; recurring seasons 1–3), Ben's wife and Max's mother, who works as a schoolteacher after giving up her job as a lawyer when moving to Patience. She notes she has environmental law degree from CU Boulder.

=== Recurring ===
- Ben Cotton as Jimmy (season 1; guest seasons 2, 4), Asta's abusive ex-husband and Jay's father
- Kaylayla Raine as Jay, Asta's teenage daughter who works part-time at the Patience health clinic
- Deborah Finkel as Abigail Hodges (seasons 1–2), the wife of Dr. Sam Hodges, the previous town doctor
- Gary Farmer as Dan Twelvetrees, Asta's adoptive father and a Vietnam veteran, who owns the town's diner, Joe's Diner, which he has named in honor of a friend and fellow soldier he lost in the war
- Mandell Maughan as Lisa Casper (seasons 1–2), a sociopathic government agent who works for General McCallister
- Alex Barima as Lieutenant David Logan (seasons 1–3; guest season 4), an officer in the U.S. Air Force. After piecing together clues about Harry's crash landing, McCallister recruits him to find the alien and partners him with Agent Casper. He ultimately succeeds McCallister as the co-leader of the government's alien program.
- Jenna Lamia as Judy Cooper, Asta and D'arcy's childhood friend who works at the local bowling alley. She is sexually adventurous and often trades barbs with D'arcy.
  - Lilly Dean (guest season 2) and Gwenna Cooper (guest season 4) portray young Judy in flashbacks
- Sarah Podemski as Kayla, Asta's cousin who is a mother and a lawyer
  - Acahkos Johnson (guest season 2) portrays young Kayla in flashbacks
- Diana Bang as Ellen Cho, a nurse at the Patience health clinic who is disrespectful to almost everyone she encounters
- Gracelyn Awad Rinke as Sahar Karimi, Max's adventurous classmate and close friend. She believes him regarding Harry's alien identity, and is the more mature and responsible of the two.
- Elvy Yost as Isabelle Vanderspeigle (season 1; guest season 3), the real Harry's estranged British wife and an artist who won her husband over at a New York City art exhibition. In the third season, Harry's son Bridget uses her physical appearance as a disguise.
- Linda Hamilton (Note: Credited as "Special Guest Star" for all appearances.) as General Eleanor McCallister (née Wright) (seasons 1–3; guest season 4), a high-ranking U.S. Air Force officer who secretly works for an unknown organization dedicated to hunting extraterrestrials, having spent her life seeking proof that aliens exist
  - Alix West Lefler (guest seasons 1–3) and Ava Anton (guest season 4) portray young Eleanor in flashbacks
- Michael Cassidy as Dr. Ethan Stone (season 1; guest seasons 2, 4), who temporarily replaces Harry as the town doctor.
  - Cassidy also portrays another member of Harry's species who kills the real Dr. Stone and assumes his identity, becoming a permanent replacement for Harry after his departure.
- Nathan Fillion (Note: Fillion previously worked with Tudyk in the 2002 series Firefly, its concluding film Serenity, and the web series Con Man.) as the voice of 42 (season 2; guest season 1), an octopus stranded in a restaurant tank (and on its menu) who can communicate telepathically with Harry
- Alvin Sanders as Lewis Thompson (season 2; guest seasons 1, 4), Mike's elderly father who moved with him to Patience due to his worsening condition
- Trevor Carroll as John Baker (seasons 2, 4; guest seasons 1, 3), Liv's husband and an avalanche-control team member
- Terry O'Quinn (Note: Credited as "Special Guest Star" for the first season only.) as Peter Bach (seasons 2–4; guest season 1), an "alien experiencer" who hosts the popular podcast Alien Tracker. Like Max, he can also see Harry's true form. After an accident leaves him clinically braindead, he is revived by the government's secret alien program as an indestructible cyborg.
  - Dylan Sloane (guest seasons 1–2) portrays young Peter Bach in flashbacks
- Justin Rain as Elliot (season 2; guest season 3), a Native American archaeologist who starts an on-and-off relationship with D'arcy
- Paul Piaskowski as Robert Hutchins (seasons 2, 4; guest season 3), Peter Bach's son, who was abducted by the Greys from his pregnant mother's womb and raised by the aliens
- Enver Gjokaj as "Joseph Rainier" (seasons 2–3; guest season 4), a Grey alien-human hybrid working for the Greys, and later, with Harry for General McCallister
- Nicola Correia-Damude as Detective Lena Torres (seasons 2–4), a detective based in Jessup, the neighboring town to Patience, who becomes romantically interested in Mike
- Kesler Talbot (season 2) and Andrea Geones (seasons 3–4) as the voice of the "Humalien" / Bridget, the human-alien offspring of "Goliath", Harry's future self. He initially disguises himself as Bobby Smallwood, a boy who went missing decades prior.
  - Talbot also portrays the real Bobby Smallwood (season 2) in flashbacks
- Edi Patterson (Note: Credited as "Special Guest Star" for her first appearance in the third season and during the fourth season.) as Heather (season 3; guest season 4), a Blue Avian alien from the Galactic Federation, who becomes romantically involved with Harry
- Clancy Brown as the voice of the Mantid alien (season 4; guest season 3), a dangerous alien fugitive who escapes from captivity and takes Harry's place in Patience
- Jewel Staite (Note: Staite previously worked with Tudyk in the 2002 series Firefly and its concluding film Serenity.) as Jules Gardner (season 4), an FBI agent who grew up in Patience and begins investigating a series of strange murders in the town

=== Guest ===
- Jan Bos as Dr. Sam Hodges (seasons 1–2), the former town doctor for Patience, who is replaced by Harry
- Michael Adamthwaite as Howard Wright, Eleanor McCallister's father, whose obsession to prove that aliens exist drove him insane. He only appears in flashbacks.
- Giorgio A. Tsoukalos as himself (seasons 1–2), a ufologist who hosts a panel on Ancient Aliens at a UFO convention
- David Lewis as Mitch Green (season 2), the mayor of Jessup
- Alex Borstein as Carlyn (season 2), a laser physicist and Kate's cousin, who gets romantically involved with Harry
- Tommy Pico as Drew (seasons 2–3), a member of Asta's extended family who lives in the city
- Grace Dove as Sunny (seasons 2, 4), a member of Asta's extended family who is heavily pregnant
- Lini Evans as Bethany Bloom (seasons 2–3), D'arcy's mother
- Barclay Hope as Gerald Bloom (seasons 2–3), D'arcy's father
- Taylor Blackwell as Liza Vanderspeigle (seasons 2–4), the estranged teenage daughter of the real Harry. In the third and fourth seasons, Harry's son Bridget uses her physical appearance as a disguise.
- Maxim Roy as Violinda Darvell (season 2), the owner and operator of a prestigious art gallery in New York who was romantically involved with the artist "Goliath"
- Robert Moloney as Tanner Corrington (season 2), a criminal associate of the real Harry
- James Gallanders as Jack Sennett (season 2), D'arcy's former skiing coach
- Karina Logue as Mary-Ellen Taylor (seasons 2–3), Asta's biological mother who abandoned her when she was an infant
- George Takei as the voice of a Grey alien (season 2), who speaks to Harry about the Greys' planned invasion of Earth
- Rachel Colwell as Lieutenant Hill (seasons 2–4), an officer in the U.S. Air Force who works for General McCallister
- Jennifer Podemski as Rachel (season 3), Asta's cousin and Kayla's sister
- Hwaa Hawk as Leo (seasons 3–4), a member of Max's alien club
- Grace Sunar as Mari (seasons 3–4), another member of Max's alien club
- Mary Walsh as Patty Baker (season 3), Liv's emotionally abusive grandmother
- Erin Karpluk as Dr. Wendy Beasley (season 3), a former military chemist and acquaintance of Peter Bach
- Linden Porco as Dale (seasons 3–4), an alien technician who specializes in fixing portals
- Peter Hogan as Mr. Hogan (season 3), an agent working under General McCallister. Hogan is also one of the co-creators of the Resident Alien comic book series.
- Jinkx Monsoon as the voice of Bruce (season 4), a Grey alien prison ward who is fascinated by Earth
- Casey Camp-Horinek as Lona (season 4), a Ute elder who befriends Harry at a powwow
- Jed Rees as Sedrick (season 4), an alien attorney who represents the Grey aliens during Harry's trial
- David Nykl as Gary (season 4), the alien leader of the Galactic Housing Council, who acts as a judge during Harry's trial
- Stephen Root as Ed (season 4), Harry's ruthless and overbearing father

== Episodes ==
Season	Episodes		Originally released		
Season	Episodes		First released	Last released	Network
1	10		January 27, 2021	March 31, 2021	Syfy
2	16	8	January 26, 2022	March 16, 2022	Syfy
2	16	8	August 10, 2022	September 28, 2022	Syfy
3	8		February 14, 2024	April 3, 2024	Syfy
4	10		June 6, 2025	August 8, 2025	Syfy; USA Network

=== Season 1 (2021) ===
No. overall	No. in season	Title	Directed by	Written by	Original release date	U.S. viewers (millions)
1	1	"Pilot"	David Dobkin	Teleplay by : Chris Sheridan	January 27, 2021	1.08 (Syfy) 0.45 (USA)
An alien spacecraft is struck by lightning and crash-lands near the rural town of Patience, Colorado. Its stranded pilot, on a mission to wipe out human life on Earth, kills Dr. Harry Vanderspeigle at his cabin and assumes his identity, spending months searching the mountains for his genocide device and fishing the lake for Dr. Vanderspeigle's corpse. "Harry" is asked by Sheriff Mike and Deputy Liv to examine the body of Sam Hodges, the town doctor, and takes on the doctor's job with help from the head nurse Asta Twelvetrees, but he learns his true form can be seen by Max, Mayor Ben Hawthorne's young son. After drinking heavily in order to fit in, Harry attempts unsuccessfully to kill Max. The next day, Harry rescues Asta from her abusive ex-husband Jimmy, and Asta confides in Harry that she gave up her and Jimmy's child for adoption when she was 16. Originally attributing Sam's death to suicide, Harry reexamines the body at the funeral and concludes he was poisoned. Harry confides in Asta that one of the mourners must be the killer. Beginning his first shift as the new town doctor, Harry discovers his first patient is Max.
2	2	"Homesick"	Robert Duncan McNeill	Chris Sheridan	February 3, 2021	1.22
Max runs screaming out of the clinic after Harry tries to behead him with a bone saw. With encouragement from Liv, Max distributes hand-drawn posters of Harry's alien form, and Harry ponders ways to kill him. D'arcy Bloom, the town bartender, goes on a date with Harry and describes the accident that ended her skiing career. Inspired, Harry cuts the brakes on Max's bicycle, but the resulting accident only causes a wound requiring stitches on Max's arm. Harry and Max verbally spar during the procedure. With help from her father Dan, Asta comes to terms with Sam's death. Feeling homesick, Harry starts gathering supplies to repair his ship, including mining tellurium, which has levitation properties. Meanwhile, a man falls from a snowy cliff while taking a selfie but is suspended by an unseen force mid-fall; he is later discovered by Lisa Casper and David Logan, still suspended and frozen to death above what appears to be a piece of Harry's crashed ship.
3	3	"Secrets"	Robert Duncan McNeill	Njeri Brown	February 10, 2021 (Note: The episode was released on February 3, 2021, on syfy.com.)	0.88
When a fisherman finds the real Harry's foot in the lake, Harry submits a baby's foreskin as a skin sample to avoid a DNA match. While the authorities scour the lake for the rest of the corpse, Harry hides it in his freezer after it washes up on the shore. Meanwhile, Ben's wife Kate struggles to figure out what to do about Max's extraterrestrial claims, which no one believes except for his classmate Sahar. Asta and D'arcy attend what turns out to be a high school party, where Asta discovers one of Sam's prescription pads was stolen and used to sell drugs to students. She finds part-time clinic employee Jay semiconscious at the party and drops her off at home, and a flashback reveals Jay was the baby she gave away. D'arcy flirts with Harry, who is oblivious. Lisa and David chat with a cowboy who witnessed Harry in his alien form months ago, and Lisa murders him after learning that he is planning on publishing a book about it.
4	4	"Birds of a Feather"	Jay Chandrasekhar	Tazbah Chavez	February 17, 2021	1.02
Ben and Kate invite Harry to dinner to convince Max that he is normal. Unfortunately, Harry invites D'arcy, who gets drunk and discusses her childhood romance with Ben. As they dine, Sahar steals Harry's house keys and has copies made. Liv vents her professional frustrations to D'arcy, who encourages her to stand up to Mike. Harry meets Asta's family and blurts out that Jay is the daughter she gave up for adoption. Despite Asta's anguish, this news brings her and Dan closer together. Max and Sahar break into Harry's cabin but are knocked unconscious by alien technology, and Harry discovers them. As he is carrying them out of the cabin, the real Harry's wife Isabelle suddenly appears.
5	5	"Love Language"	Jay Chandrasekhar	Sarah Beckett	February 24, 2021	1.24
A flashback reveals how the real Harry met his wife Isabelle at an art exhibition. After Harry sneaks Max and Sahar back into their homes, he signs papers to divorce Isabelle, who is hurt and baffled by his behavior. D'arcy and Isabelle share their romantic woes, not realizing they are talking about the same man. When Ben and Kate learn Max broke into Harry's cabin, Harry encourages them to send Max to an out-of-state institution. However, Sahar convinces Harry and Max to agree to a truce. Jay discovers Asta is her mother and quits the clinic. Harry gradually warms to Isabelle. Mike receives toxicology results that prove Sam was poisoned.
6	6	"Sexy Beast"	Jennifer Phang	Emily Eslami & Jeffrey Nieves	March 3, 2021	1.20
Harry becomes jealous upon meeting Ethan Stone, the handsome and virtuous new town doctor, until he dislocates Ethan's shoulder while arm-wrestling. Harry repeatedly drugs Isabelle unconscious so he can search for his device. He tells Mike about the stolen prescription pad, and Liv remains on the ball with the investigation while Mike makes a fool of himself grilling a teenage suspect. During a girls' bowling night, Asta accuses Jimmy of stealing the prescription pads. A flashback reveals the story of General Eleanor Wright, who saw a UFO when she was a child. Fifty years later, after Harry's spaceship blipped on military surveillance, Wright recruited Lisa and David for a covert investigation which eventually leads them to Harry's invisible spaceship where they wait for him to return. The spaceship is taken to a military bunker, and just as Harry realizes his ship is missing, a vehicle bears down on him.
7	7	"The Green Glow"	Jennifer Phang	Elias Benavidez	March 10, 2021	1.07
The driver is revealed to be Isabelle, who has discovered that Harry has been drugging her. Realizing they are being watched, Harry loudly says he needed space from her and throws off Lisa and David. Furious, Isabelle returns to New York. This, the loss of his job, and the loss of his spaceship drives Harry into depression. In a drug- and alcohol-induced blackout, Harry dreams the real Harry's corpse attacks him for killing him and taunts him for failing in his mission. To cheer up Harry, Asta and D'arcy get him high, and he ends up telepathically conversing with an octopus cousin in a tank at a Japanese restaurant. Jimmy leads Mike and Liv to the stolen prescription pads and the high school janitor who was selling them, but when Mike fails to acknowledge Liv's role in single-handedly apprehending the culprit, she tells him off and quits. Harry tells Ben and Kate that he misdiagnosed Max, and they decide not to send him away. In return, Max uses his ability to see the green glow emitted by Harry's device to locate it on a glacier. When Harry reaches it, his ship activates, and David pinpoints Harry's location. Fearing for Harry's safety, Asta and D'arcy arrive on the glacier, and the ground gives way beneath their feet.
8	8	"End of the World As We Know It"	Shannon Kohli	Christian Taylor	March 17, 2021	1.27
D'arcy is knocked unconscious as Asta and Harry find themselves deep in a crevasse of the glacier. Harry's leg is wounded, making him unable to conceal his identity, but Asta nobly steps up to tend to his medical needs and search for his lost device (which Harry says is a radio). Meanwhile, Ben, on Mike's advice, tries to be more assertive on his anniversary, but Kate is less than impressed. Lisa and David enter town to find the alien and discover one of Max's posters. D'arcy recovers and pulls Harry and Asta out of the crevasse, but Asta abandons her at the hospital and drives Harry to Dan's diner. Harry's wound is infected, and he resigns himself to death until Asta reveals she found his device, and he resolves to complete his mission as Dan amputates his leg.
9	9	"Welcome Aliens"	Shannon Kohli	Nastaran Dibai	March 24, 2021	1.16
As Harry's leg regenerates, he discovers that his device is broken. In need of a metal used to make trackers that the grey aliens implant in human abductees, he and Asta visit an alien experiencer convention. After several experiencers share their harrowing stories, Asta goes onstage and shares her positive experience, though another attendee later warns her that her alien might be a "Christopher Columbus". After Harry nearly removes a BB pellet from a phony experiencer, he extracts a tracker from the neck of alien hunter Peter Bach, who is also able to see through Harry's genetic cloak and whose unborn son was abducted by grey aliens 30 years prior. Meanwhile, David and Lisa pose as a couple and have dinner with the Hawthornes to get closer to Max. Using Liv's murder board, Mike arrests Abigail Hodges, Sam's widow, who had been having an affair and (as a beautician) had access to botulinum toxins used for botox injections. He swallows his pride and, during karaoke, invites Liv back onto the force. Troubled by Asta's behavior and absence, D'arcy breaks into Harry's cabin and discovers the corpse of the real Dr. Vanderspeigle.
10	10	"Heroes of Patience"	Robert Duncan McNeill	Chris Sheridan	March 31, 2021	1.14
In a flashback, the real Harry poisons Sam's insulin hours before being killed by alien Harry himself. D'arcy tells Mike and Liv about the real Harry's corpse, but Harry has already hidden it in the cabin's loft. Liv then finds one of the real Harry's boots on the lake shore, leading to Harry becoming a person of interest. With his device operational again, Harry hesitates to activate it, visiting a pizzeria and placing a bulk order. He imagines the corpse taunting him about forming emotional connections and scolding him for taking them from him. Harry tests his device on the corpse, disintegrating it, but burns his finger and fears he is now human enough for the device to kill him. When Liv visits the clinic to compare the severed foot with the recovered boot (and sees a mole on that foot which matches a mole she had previously seen on alien Harry's foot), Asta deduces that Harry killed the real Dr. Vanderspeigle. She confronts Harry and tells him they are no longer friends. Heartbroken, Harry activates his device. Lisa and David hold Max and Sahar hostage, only to be beaten and chased away by Ben and Kate. The agents then capture Ethan since Max told them the alien was the 'town doctor', and Lisa and General McCallister abandon David, revealing that they work for a secret organization. D'arcy comforts Jay after she confides in her that Asta is her mother, and they confront Jimmy, warning him to stay away from Asta before releasing the brakes on his parked truck. Harry finds his ship and plans to drop the device from space, but he sees Asta and Max held captive by government troops and fights to save them. Asta convinces Harry to spare humanity, and he leaves to dispose of his device in space. En route to his home planet, he finds Max has stowed away.

=== Season 2 (2022) ===
No. overall	No. in season	Title	Directed by	Written by	Original release date	U.S. viewers (millions)
Part 1
11	1	"Old Friends"	Robert Duncan McNeill	Chris Sheridan	January 26, 2022	1.36 (Syfy) 0.54 (USA)
Harry awakes in a hospital after being found walking down the road naked with a head injury. Harry cannot remember any recent details, but remembers he is an alien sent to Earth to eradicate all human life, making the hospital staff believe he is insane. Asta visits Ben at home, not knowing what has become of Max and Harry. Max shows Asta the invisible ship, which has crashed in the baseball field. Asta finds Harry, who now believes he is Lennie Briscoe from Law & Order, and takes him back to the sushi restaurant in an attempt to jog his memory. 42, the live-tank octopus who can also communicate telepathically with Asta, restores Harry's memory, and Harry takes 42 home, as octopuses are closely related to his alien species. At the cabin, Max confronts Harry about how the alien shielded him during the crash while returning to Earth. Max says this proves Harry loves him like a father would. Harry angrily throws Max out, claiming he is responsible for being stuck on Earth, though he is secretly concerned he is becoming more human. The next morning, Max finds he has grown chest hair overnight. Meanwhile, Mike and Liv follow up on the severed foot at Harry's home, and conclude his front door has been replaced after a struggle. The sheriff also privately observes an anniversary of a dead ex-partner.
12	2	"The Wire"	Robert Duncan McNeill	Sarah Beckett	February 2, 2022	1.04
Max has taken a piece from Harry's "survival kit", which is causing his hair growth including a beard. The neighboring town, Jessup, advertises their tourism as better than Patience's, as there are no severed feet in Jessup. Severed-foot vandalism appears on town signs, and "murder tours" begin. Aware his planet may send more of his species to eradicate Earth, Harry begins experiencing nightmares and transforms a survival kit piece into an underground bunker. Asta gets Harry invited to the sheriff's poker game to make more friends, hoping Harry will find more reasons besides her to save humanity. At the game, Harry learns the real Harry almost sold his cabin 6 years ago but changed his mind. The sheriff and deputy continue their surveillance of Harry, seeing him removing large amounts of dirt from his house. Through their investigation they find the realtor who listed the cabin, who tells them the original Harry was selling the cabin to pay a $500,000 debt, which he suddenly paid in cash. They also learn Harry was disciplined at work for being in areas where the same toxin that killed the Patience doctor was stored. Harry shows Asta the bunker, and she is horrified to learn more aliens will come to destroy Earth. She gets Harry to agree to contact his planet just before the sheriff arrives to question Harry. Harry avoids discovery by using a piece from his survival kit to disguise himself as Asta.
13	3	"Girls' Night"	Shannon Kohli	Jenna Lamia	February 9, 2022	1.09
Twenty-four years ago at a summer camp, the young Liv witnesses a flash of light in the sky implied to be an alien spacecraft. In the present, Mike and Liv confront Harry, who avoids arrest using superhuman athleticism, erases their memories of the encounter, and makes them think the FBI has taken over the Sam Hodges murder investigation. To compete with Jessup's mayor, Ben films a commercial presenting Patience's tourism as pleasant. Max and Sahar confront Harry about the advance-aging effects of one of Harry's survival kit pieces on Max. Asta, D'arcy, Kate, and several friends go out for a girls' night, accompanied by Kate's cousin Carlyn, a laser physicist fascinated by Harry's partially constructed homeworld contact device, but unaware of its alien origins. At the bar, Harry and Carlyn connect romantically, although Harry wants to swipe her ID badge to enter her laboratory and steal a key component to complete the device. Asta chides him, and he leaves the bar in humiliation. The ladies sneak into Ben's office and learn that women in Patience are underpaid compared to men, so they threaten to kidnap Ben if he does not resolve this. The next day, Asta finds Harry has taken control of Carlyn's body by shapeshifting into her likeness and leaving her real, unconscious body in bed. Harry enters the laser lab, steals the needed component, and repeatedly throws Carlyn's boss around the room after an unwelcome advance. D'arcy drops flyers demanding equal pay from a helicopter, much to the ladies' delight. Ben, feeling guilty about the night he and D'arcy kissed, almost tells Kate the truth but instead tells her about bringing the gender pay gap issue to the attention of the town assembly.
14	4	"Radio Harry"	Shannon Kohli	Tommy Pico	February 16, 2022	1.02
While Harry prepares to take his completed communication device to a mountain peak to achieve optimum communication, Max and Sahar tell Asta that they suspect the device is another explosive. Asta and Dan accompany Harry on his hike to ensure he isn't lying, only to be joined by two of Asta's cousins, Kayla and Drew. While Dan keeps them entertained, Harry and Asta reach their destination, and Harry activates his device, explaining that he intends to keep his people from invading Earth for 50 years, as he is only interested in sparing Asta from mass extinction. Though Asta is infuriated, she receives an urgent call from Big Leroy, another member of her tribe. After Harry assists Leroy's wife, Sunny, in the birth of her son, he reconciles with Asta and realizes how much humans value each other's lives. Asta, feeling Jay will never be her daughter, visits Jimmy, and they embrace. Meanwhile, Liv talks with D'arcy about her recently lost memory. She talks Mike into going out on a date, but Mike hesitates to talk to his date about the mistake that cost him his career as a police officer in Washington, D.C. D'arcy's parents visit and ask her about her life, with which she is not happy. Ben and Kate confront Mitch Green, the mayor of Jessup, about his smear campaign against Patience at a restaurant. Two men capture a patient leaving a psychiatrist's office and take him to a secret facility full of humans suspected as aliens operated by General McCallister, who discovers Dr. Ethan Stone is not an alien as she had assumed. Back at the cabin, Harry receives a mysterious phone number from New York City, which Lisa intercepts and reports to McCallister.
15	5	"Family Day"	Lea Thompson	Biniam Bizuneh	February 23, 2022	0.90
Harry discovers via Mike that the original Harry had a daughter with his first wife, named Liza, who ran away from a camp for troubled teens to visit her father in Patience. He kidnaps Murphy, one of the dogs Sahar walks for her neighbors, demanding that she and Max return the survival kit piece, unaware it is now in the hands of David, who learns of its gravity-defying effects. While Harry struggles to bond with Liza, D'arcy confronts Asta about her night at Jimmy's house. At a Family Day gathering in a park, Harry finally connects with Liza and places a positive memory in Mike's head to replace the blanked-out memory of his attempt to arrest him. Asta enters a chili pepper eating contest opposite D'arcy to impress Jay, and Max and his schoolmates perform a grotesque play about the town's famed 59 miners who died to save one. The next day, as Liza bids a heartfelt goodbye, Harry realizes how much he misses his own family and feels prepared to leave for New York. Liv confides to Mike her belief that an alien erased their memories.
16	6	"An Alien in New York"	Lea Thompson	Elias Benavidez	March 2, 2022	0.96
A flashback reveals that the original Harry and Dr. Hodges were involved in stealing money from a charity event in New York. In the present, Sahar tells Harry that his survival kit piece was stolen from her. Harry refuses to return Murphy the dog to her, only to find that Murphy has mortally wounded 42 the octopus, and Sahar takes Murphy back. After he mournfully cooks and eats 42, Harry travels with Asta to the New York pizza parlor from where the mysterious phone number came. Across the street corner, they find a mural with the word "Goliath" written in Harry's language. This leads Harry to locate other murals across the city and pinpoint the art gallery of Goliath, a member of his kind. During a gala at the gallery, he and Asta speak with Violinda Darvell, the Brazilian-born operator, who knows who Harry is and asks Asta how long she has known his secret. One of the party guests gives Harry a tab of LSD, which he ingests, causing him to hallucinate and lose control over his human form as he wanders into the streets. Liv talks to Mike about her alien theories, which he dismisses, although he later opens up to her about losing Jesse, his partner, back in Washington, D.C. With Kate and Max out of town, D'arcy helps Ben with confidence about making his own decisions, and she spends the night in Max's bedroom.
17	7	"Escape From New York"	Claudia Yarmy	Emily Eslami & Jeffrey Nieves	March 9, 2022	0.98
Violinda takes Asta to a secret room in Goliath's gallery, where she has preserved Goliath's fossilized corpse. Asta then catches up with Harry and restores his senses with ice. When Asta tells him she saw Goliath's corpse, he rushes her back to the gallery and smashes it, revealing an alien egg inside. Violinda confesses that Goliath used her DNA to impregnate himself, causing him to fossilize and Harry promises to safeguard the egg. Kate confronts Ben about putting up a sign she doesn't like in their house, unaware D'arcy encouraged him to do so. D'arcy and Kate discuss whether the latter may be pregnant again. Ben dismisses the elderly Dr. Smallwood from her position as town doctor after she mistakenly misdiagnoses him with cancer and Nurse Ellen recommends that he re-hire Harry. Liv posts a UFO video to the Internet, only to be ridiculed by online trolls. Lisa, who followed Harry to New York, gives chase out of the gallery and kills two men who recognize Harry, one of whom has a name tag identifying him as Alex Ogilvie of the Galvan/Powell Group. On a train out of the city, Lisa corners Harry, having followed a trail of liquid leaked by the egg, and they battle until Harry dangles her out of a shattered window. An oncoming train from the opposite track decapitates Lisa. At the diner, Dan talks to Mike about how he lost a friend named Joe in the Vietnam War and named the diner in his honor. Having surmised that Abigail Hodges did not murder her husband, being unable to sell his possessions at a yard sale for sentimental reasons, Mike and Liv search Sam's office for clues concerning motive for his murder. Inspired by Sam's detective novel collection left to him by Abigail, Mike and Liv discover a list of names (including Galvan/Powell) hidden behind a picture frame. Back at the cabin, Asta tells Dan about Goliath and the egg. Harry plans to store the egg in his bunker, but he and the Twelvetreeses are greeted by several friends, who throw him a surprise birthday party as the egg starts to hatch.
18	8	"Alien Dinner Party"	Claudia Yarmy	Chris Sheridan	March 16, 2022	1.10
General McCallister confronts David in a forest about his alien survival kit piece but she flees when a sniper, who blinks in an alien-like manner, shoots him. Shortly after arriving home to a surprise party, Harry puts the bag with the alien egg in his bunker. Harry explains to Asta that after an alien baby hatches, it eats any high calorie food it can find, including humans. Asta tries to get rid of the house guests but Harry keeps the party going due to the promise of pie. Harry goes to the basement to check on the egg and discovers it has already hatched and the alien baby is missing. D'arcy helps Kate take a pregnancy test in the bathroom. Later, D'arcy mentions she went rock climbing with Ben. After Ben admits to secretly planning to get a ski resort opened in Patience to boost tourism, Mike lets it slip that she kissed Ben. Kate becomes angry with Ben for not telling her he spent time with D'arcy while she was gone and tells him she is pregnant. Jay requests that Asta spend her upcoming 18th birthday with her. Asta goes to the cabin's bathroom and discovers the alien baby in the toilet and it runs out the window. Meanwhile, Max and Sahar escape from Nurse Ellen, who is doing a poor job babysitting them, to warn Harry that the government is looking for him. Arriving at Harry's house, they observe the alien baby eat a raccoon. After Asta informs Harry that the baby alien ran out the window, he goes outside to look for it. After hearing the baby chitter, Liv's memories begin to return. The baby forms a telepathic link with Harry and gives him a vision from Goliath, who informs him that their species is not trying to kill humanity but wants to stop another alien species that is planning on conquering Earth. A mysterious man who ordered the original Harry to kill Dr. Hodges arrives and shoots the current Harry, ending the telepathic link while the alien baby jumps into the lake. Asta shoots the man with one of Harry's guns.
Part 2
19	9	"Autopsy"	Kabir Akhtar	Cherry Chevapravatdumrong	August 10, 2022	0.66 (Syfy) 0.27 (USA)
Harry, Asta, and D'arcy hide the man's corpse from Mike and move it unknowingly into Jessup. Two of the man's associates, who were watching from a rowboat, are attacked by the alien baby, which later disgorges one of their IDs. Harry convinces Asta not to go to the police, though she remains shaken. Harry plans to tamper with the autopsy so Asta is not implicated. However, tipped off by Ben, Detective Lena Torres of Jessup takes over the investigation and confiscates the body. Mike and Liv research Galvan/Powell Group and Liv records a message to submit to a professional alien tracker with her UFO video. Ben reinstates Harry as the town doctor and shares his marital woes with him. David, having survived being shot thanks to the alien sphere, reunites with General McCallister, who is also being hunted by the alien assassin who shot David. Harry plants the shell from Asta's shot in Patience, convincing Torres to surrender the body to him for the autopsy. During the procedure, Asta has a nervous breakdown. Sympathetic, Harry removes her memories of the night, inadvertently causing her to miss Jay's birthday lunch.
20	10	"The Ghost of Bobby Smallwood"	Kabir Akhtar	Christian Taylor	August 17, 2022	0.67
81 years ago, a boy named Bobby Smallwood hunts a rabbit with his sister and follows it into the "59" abandoned mine, but never returns. In the present day, Harry is glad to see Asta happy with her memory erased. He presents the autopsy results to Mike, Liv, and Det. Lena Torres from the Jessup PD. Mike and Det. Torres, discovering both are former big-city cops (from Washington, D.C. and New York City, respectively), enjoy working together, which makes Liv feel left out. The alien baby disappears into the abandoned mine Bobby entered. Jay asks Asta about failing to meet her at the diner for her birthday like they planned; Asta confronts Harry, who restores her memory. Seeing Harry is having trouble processing his brush with death, Asta consoles him that negative emotions are just as important to humans as are positive ones. Bobby's now-elderly sister recognizes someone as Bobby in public; Sahar sees the boy and overhears the conversation, and deduces that the alien baby found Bobby's remains and used his DNA to create a human body for itself. Sahar takes the alien baby to the trailer, where she shows it to Max (who can see the baby's alien form) and says she wants to keep it a secret from Harry, whom she believes is breeding aliens to take over the Earth. Ben tells Kate he is afraid of her, but they reconcile during a heartfelt phone conversation. Harry assists a terminally ill patient to die by suicide, and in doing so confronts his own fear of death.
21	11	"The Weight"	Warren P. Sonoda	Zach Cannon	August 24, 2022	0.74
David watches surveillance videos to figure out who the alien is and correctly suspects the alien is still in Patience. General McCallister tests the alien sphere by having Dr. Ethan hold it, then pushes him off the edge of a mountain. When he survives the fall, albeit seriously injured, McCallister realizes the alien sphere can protect anyone. Asta is frustrated with the situations she gets into because of Harry and feels the weight of the world on her shoulders, and she confides this to Dan, who offers to share that burden, drawing on his experiences in Vietnam. Harry investigates the mine the alien baby disappeared into. When he finds footprints, he realizes the baby alien took human form. Since Max can see aliens in their original form when disguised as humans, Harry pays Max to figure out who is the alien baby in human form. When Max does not take him seriously, Harry realizes Max already knows the baby's human form; he convinces Max that Sahar is in danger as long as she is around the alien baby, so Max takes Harry to the RV in the woods. When Harry finds the baby, he and Sahar argue over who should raise it, and it runs away. Asta and Liv figure out that the creek is contaminated with heavy metals. Kate tells Ben that a blood test revealed that she is not pregnant after all; both react with relief.
22	12	"The Alien Within"	Warren P. Sonoda	Nastaran Dibai	August 31, 2022	0.64
60 years in the future, Harry reflects on growing attached to his now elderly human body and missing Asta, who has died, while watching Patience burn. In the present day, Harry worries about becoming more human and doesn't want to end up like Goliath, so he temporarily reverts to his alien form. General McCallister goes undercover and serves lunch at Max's school, but Sahar notices her high-tech watch and becomes suspicious. When Max gets a stomach ache, Sahar believes McCallister put a tracking device in his food, and gives him a laxative to defecate it out. Ben announces plans to build a resort, which angers most residents because it could attract big corporations and destroy local businesses. On Halloween, Harry takes Sahar out of school to search for the alien baby, whom Max finds at school. David, who has been watching surveillance of Max and Sahar talking about aliens at school, sees the encounter, and realizes the baby is an alien. Max uses a walkie-talkie to tell Sahar he found the baby, but the signal is broken; eventually, the baby escapes. Asta, D'arcy, Kayla and Liv take Kate to an old bridge where they played during their childhoods, and convince her to join them in opposing the resort. Harry and Sahar arrive at the RV just as military forces pull it away with a helicopter, abducting the baby inside. Asta finds a book of Goliath's paintings in Harry's mail. One painting depicts an encounter between Asta and Harry only they were present for, and Asta deduces that Goliath is Harry's future self. 500 years in the future, humanity (and apparently all life) is extinct, and Harry, having shed his human form, lives alone on Earth. He finds a portal and emerges from it in Brazil 33 years before his arrival on Earth, becoming Goliath.
23	13	"Harry, a Parent"	Brennan Shroff	Jenna Lamia	September 7, 2022	0.58
After learning that Goliath is his future self who went back in time, Harry tells Asta that there are two alien races that could have created the portal to travel back in time: the Greys and the Alpha Draconians. Harry, believing the Greys have no interest in Earth beyond anal probing, deduces the Alpha Draconians want to destroy Earth. Asta finds out that Dan has been hiding a letter from her mother, who gave her up for adoption. While Harry, Asta, and D'arcy travel to a ski competition that D'arcy is competing in, Harry stops at the 37th parallel north to send a message to the Alpha Draconians through crop circles, stating that he claims Earth for himself and cursing at the Alpha Draconians. When he tells this to Asta, she is worried how they will react now that Harry angered them. Harry and Asta travel to meet Asta's biological mother, who has no interest in her, so she and Harry go back to the ski competition. D'arcy introduces her archaeologist boyfriend, Elliot, to everyone. While traveling back home, the car suddenly stops and Asta and D'arcy freeze in time. Harry exits the car and finds a spaceship. A Grey emerges to tell him they are the ones planning to destroy humanity, not the Alpha Draconians; it warns him not to interfere. Kate and Ben fight over the plans to build a resort in Patience.
24	14	"Cat and Mouse"	Brennan Shroff	Sarah Beckett and Emily Eslami & Jeffrey Nieves	September 14, 2022	0.57
After studying the baby alien, General McCallister is convinced that he is not an alien but a child playing a practical joke. After questioning him further, he reverts to his alien form. Kate meets with Kayla to petition a judge to prevent building the resort, so Ben and Kate agree not to talk about the subject at home. Liv meets with Peter Bach at the diner, so Harry and Asta escape through the kitchen, but Peter, who can see Harry's true form, catches a glimpse of him through the window. He tries chasing Harry, who escapes. Liv shows Peter a drawing Max made of Harry, and Peter concludes that Max shares his ability. Peter questions Max and gives him his business card. Harry sees the encounter and feels that Max has betrayed him. Mike invites himself to Ben and Kate's for dinner so he can convince Kate to approve of the resort. Max gets tired of the arguing, so he goes to his room and finds Harry there. Harry wants to know where Peter is, but Max doesn't tell him, unsure of whom to trust. D'arcy acts strangely because of her opioid addiction, enabled by Harry administering the drug at her insistence. When she won't tell Elliot what is happening, he breaks up with her. Peter shows up at Harry's house, but Harry captures him first, as it's implied Max warned Harry in advance.
25	15	"Best of Enemies"	Robert Duncan McNeill	Nastaran Dibai	September 21, 2022	0.58
Asta discovers Harry has been holding Peter hostage and removed an alien tracker planted in his neck by the Greys, which Peter states was his only connection to his son. The rivals eventually agree to work together to infiltrate General McCallister's secret base in Wyoming. Harry pretends to be Peter's captive and is taken to a holding cell in the base, from which he escapes while Peter handcuffs McCallister and uses her computer to free human prisoners who claim to have witnessed aliens, including his now-grown son, Robert. Harry mind-controls several wounded soldiers he fought in the first season finale to fight back against the soldiers pursuing him, allowing him to reunite with the alien baby, who gives him future Harry's (Goliath's) complete message. Before he can leave the baby to fend for itself, he takes it in his care when it calls him "Daddy". As Robert attempts to rejoin his father, Peter sacrifices himself by taking a bullet aimed at Robert from the assassin who nearly killed David. Harry almost kills McCallister but spares her at the baby's insistence. He then drives Robert and the baby to safety, and the latter regurgitates his missing sphere, having previously swallowed it. Liv watches video of Peter driving his truck with somebody (Harry) in the passenger seat. In Patience, D'arcy, now recovering from her addiction and reluctant to return to work, instead spends time bonding with Dan at the Twelvetrees house. Asta tells her father to convince D'arcy to leave, and he replies that it is time for her move out, too, so she and D'arcy agree to be roommates in their next residence. Ben, who has been losing sleep over whether or not to go forward with plans for a resort as well as feeling unloved, drives exhausted one night and has a car accident. He reconciles with Kate at the clinic, and the other townspeople join him to show their compassion.
26	16	"I Believe in Aliens"	Robert Duncan McNeill	Chris Sheridan	September 28, 2022	0.55
Harry has the alien baby give Asta Goliath's message: his people are not coming to Earth, the Greys have sent Grey-human hybrids to Earth, and he is Harry's future self. Goliath also says that General McCallister has the resources to save Earth. Harry wants to adopt Robert, who would rather live his own life. Before Robert leaves, Harry gives him the sphere for protection. Even though Ben has decided not to build the resort, he is still sleepwalking. Jay finds Asta at the café and asks for her old job back. Liv hears on the news that Peter was killed in a car crash but believes this is a cover-up. The Grey-human assassin who killed Peter, Joseph, informs Harry that Harry's people have ceded Earth and there is a pod on a mountain to take him home. Since Harry has information from the future that he will fail to save Earth, he decides to leave and says goodbye to Max, who informs Sahar. Sahar comes to say goodbye to the alien baby, whom Harry has named Bridget. Reconsidering his decision, Harry uses the pod to send Bridget home. D'arcy finds the toxin used to kill Sam in Asta's room. She goes to Harry's cabin to confront Asta, demands to know the truth, and threatens to end their friendship. Harry then reverts to his alien form, and D'arcy is relieved to know the secret Asta has been keeping from her. The military arrives in search of Harry, who tells Asta and D'arcy to hide in his bunker, and takes him to a compound to see McCallister. Joseph applies for a job as a deputy in Patience. Robert is abducted by the Greys and brought to a spaceship with Ben. The Greys inform Ben that they abducted the fetus from Kate's womb three months ago.

=== Season 3 (2024) ===
No. overall	No. in season	Title	Directed by	Written by	Original release date	U.S. viewers (millions)
27	1	"Lone Wolf"	Robert Duncan McNeill	Chris Sheridan & Nastaran Dibai & Aaron Wiener	February 14, 2024	0.465
Harry has begun working at General McAllister's office part-time, hoping to eliminate the potential threat the Grey Aliens pose. Back at the Patience clinic, Joseph freezes time to speak to Harry about his decision to remain on Earth, and both aliens vow to keep their plans secret from one another. Resuming time, Joseph introduces himself to Asta. Though Harry wants to keep Asta safe, he decides to let her take Joseph on a date so he can covertly use communication equipment he had received from McAllister to gather information on Joseph. When D'arcy visits Harry's cabin and finds out what he is doing, she smashes the equipment, leaving Harry without evidence. Nevertheless, D'arcy fakes illness to eject Joseph from her and Asta's apartment so she and Harry can tell the truth about Joseph. Harry returns to the apartment later that night to kill Asta, believing she is an obstacle to saving the world, but cannot bring himself to do it. Asta comforts him and assures him that, together, they will undermine Joseph and save Earth from the Greys. Meanwhile, Ben and Kate have troubling visions related to their abductions by the Greys, which they do not appear to recall. As Kate learns that the owl she keeps hallucinating out her window is a common omen of death, Dan gives her a traditional Ute cedar incense stick to ward off evil omens. Sahar tells Max about her acceptance into a prestigious California school for gifted students. Though he is saddened by her moving away from Patience, he takes comfort in her telling him that he has succeeded Peter's position as humanity's primary "alien tracker".
28	2	"The Upper Hand"	Lea Thompson	Elias Benavidez	February 21, 2024	0.525
70 years ago, a young girl encounters a Grey and drops a snow globe souvenir from Yellowstone. In the present, Harry and Asta inform D'arcy of their plan to capture Joseph, though D'arcy is uncertain whether Asta should trust him. While Asta goes on a date with Joseph at the diner, Harry and D'arcy sneak into his house and fall for an alien trap that slowly begins to shrink, threatening to crush them. Joseph receives a notification on his phone about this and, correctly concluding that Asta knows his secret, demands to know why Harry is still on Earth. Max, who has started a club with two other classmates for tracking aliens, arrives at Joseph's house and says he will release Harry by unplugging the trap if he admits his identity. Harry, still trying to keep his secret from the other students to avoid having more children follow him around, ends up praising Max for being a good alien tracker, leading to his and D'arcy's safe release. Asta sedates Joseph, and she and Dan take him to Harry's cabin for questioning. Joseph states that he actually knows nothing about the Greys' ultimate goals, which Harry suspects they are keeping from Joseph as he is half human. Ben and Kate, still concerned about the latter's owl hallucinations, consider selling their house but ultimately decide to take a vacation in Yellowstone. Mike expresses interest in modelling Ben's foot but notices a tiny bump on the heel. After Lena breaks up with him, he gets drunk at the bar and wakes up the next morning in bed with Judy. Harry realizes that the Greys have placed a tracker in Ben's foot and hypnotizes him to understand what happened when he was abducted. Ben remembers seeing the Yellowstone snow globe before Harry wakes him up with no memory of the hypnosis.
29	3	"141 Seconds"	Robert Duncan McNeill	Sarah Beckett	February 28, 2024	0.468
Harry joins the Hawthornes on their vacation to Yellowstone, hoping to gather information on the Greys' operations. Ben buys a knit hat with the emblem of a gravel construction company, and Harry concludes that the company is a front for the Greys' operations. Max helps by tasering a guard so Harry can sneak below the secret base, where he discovers a vast underground reservoir connected to Old Faithful. He realizes that the Greys plan to cause a cataclysmic eruption through the geyser, the first in over 600,000 years. Elsewhere, Kate, who has been having recurring dreams of holding her infant daughter controlled by the Greys, with the memory of each dream wiped upon waking up, starts hearing a baby crying, while Ben cannot. On vacation, this leads her to discover an infant in the care of a new mother, and she becomes emotional. In Patience, Liv catches video evidence of Harry being transported in the Alien Tracker's car but can only see his shirt, so she cannot identify the wearer. She shares this news with Asta, Dan, and D'arcy, who gather and burn all of Harry's plaid shirts, as the camera only captured Harry's shirt in black and white. Following their one-night stand, Judy wants a more serious relationship with Mike, even introducing him to her mother, but he turns her down. He comforts Liv after her grandmother shares Liv's unsuccessful attempt to prove the existence of aliens with news media, which mocks her. Back at Harry's cabin, a Blue Avian arrives through a portal to inform Harry that he has broken galactic law by refusing to leave Earth against the Greys' orders.
30	4	"Avian Flu"	Kabir Akhtar	Teleplay by : Emily Eslami & Jeffrey Nieves & Alexandra Lazarowich; Story by : Emily Eslami & Jeffrey Nieves	March 6, 2024	0.515
The Blue Avian, called Heather when in human form, returns to retrieve the documents that Harry has been ordered to sign before leaving Earth. D'arcy throws a banana from Harry's fruit bowl into the portal Heather used, damaging it and stranding her on Earth. Harry, who has romantically fantasized about Blue Avians since his adolescence, cannot take his mind off her, which interferes with his work to undermine the Greys' plans. He tries to start a relationship with her, but she declines, saying they are better off as friends. Still, Heather remains fascinated by Harry being the only member of his species with emotions, and when he sends her a person-sized bird's nest as a gift, she rejoins him at his cabin, where they passionately kiss in their real forms. Jay is frustrated by her lack of knowledge about her birth mother's family history while writing her college application essay, so Asta and Dan take her to meet their extended family at a wedding reception on the Ute reservation for Asta's cousin Drew and his husband Manuel. Mike and Liv trace a fingerprint they have been investigating to Peter, so they visit his widow for questioning. Kate plans to write a children's book, but Ben discovers that it is full of violent illustrations of a mother owl attacking rats and feeding them to her babies. Max mentions that people hallucinating owls can be an after-effect of an alien abduction, prompting Kate to search the Internet for more information. McCallister locates David, whom she retired, and brings him back to the government base to show him that Peter is still alive, albeit brain dead.
31	5	"Lovebird"	Andrew Seklir	Kelechi Urama	March 13, 2024	0.595
Harry and Heather's intimate romantic relationship intensifies to the point where they want to move to her home world together. This worries Asta and D'arcy, who insist that Harry should focus on saving the world, especially since Mike and Liv have been investigating the Alien Tracker's truck. Harry tricks the officers into giving him a notebook they found with a chemical formula containing a Grey element. He attempts to recreate this formula for the model of Old Faithful he has been building, but Max steals the whole project and tries to pass it off as his at a school science fair. When Harry catches him, Max pours the formula into the model geyser, while Harry pulls a fire alarm, prompting everyone else in the school to evacuate. Seeing every object in the science fair hall float under the effects of the gas, Harry realizes that the Greys want to alter Earth's atmosphere and gravity so only they can survive and claim Earth for themselves. Heather is apprehended by Joseph, who threatens her family unless she gives the Greys a sample of Harry's DNA and leaves the planet without him, and she agrees. Meanwhile, D'arcy has nightmares about her repressed childhood memory of Ben being abducted by aliens. She tells this to Ben, who is uncertain of her claims. Kate talks to Liv about possibly being abducted, and Liv, still being publicly ridiculed for her belief in aliens, talks to her about various signs of being abducted, including unusual marks on people's skin where aliens may have placed trackers. Kate finds one such mark on the back of her neck after a bath. At McCallister's base, David, unable to help Peter out of his brain dead state, uses a computer to see through his eyes, allowing him to see Harry's real form while Harry converses with McCallister.
32	6	"Bye Bye Birdie"	Nastaran Dibai	Nastaran Dibai	March 20, 2024	0.452
After Heather cleans out Harry's gills in his real form, she tells him she is going to leave. They exchange letters using a pigeon until Heather tells Harry in person that she has decided to break up with him. Harry sinks into severe depression despite Asta and D'arcy encouraging him not to give up on his bomb. Judy records Heather giving Harry's DNA in the form of his gill gunk to Joseph, and Harry feels betrayed. Mike takes Liv to confront her grandmother about her negative media portrayal. After Liv dishes out a profanity-laced rant, her grandmother suffers a non-lethal heart attack. At Liv's alien experiencer support group, Kate overhears an attendant's testimony about an indicator of a tracking device on his body. Harry's son Bridget returns to Earth, assumes the identity of a truck driver he kills, and tells a diner waitress he plans to kill his father.
33	7	"Here Comes My Baby"	Brennan Shroff	Donald Todd	March 27, 2024	0.575
Bridget arrives at Harry's cabin in the form of the original Harry's daughter Liza, having picked up some DNA the real Liza left behind, and unsuccessfully attempts to kill Harry. While trying to ruin his father's reputation, Bridget gets drunk in Harry's form at the bar. Harry tries to enlist Max's help, but he rebuffs him, leading Harry to steal his alien tracking device from him. Sahar, having returned to Patience because she did not fit in at her new school, offers to help because Bridget likes her. Though they bond at first, Harry disintegrates his son, whose disassembled pieces gather DNA left around the cabin to transform into clones of everyone who has ever visited. While Sahar escapes amid the battle, Harry disintegrates each of Bridget's human forms, and even a replica of 42 the octopus, until Bridget transforms into a copy of Max, who scolds his father for leaving him alone on an icy planet like Harry was when he was born. Harry admits he loves his son, and they make up. Asta's birth mother Mary Ellen starts asking her for money. Mike and Liv grow increasingly suspicious of Ben's behavior, and vice versa, and spy on each other until they run into Joseph. In their attempted escape, Ben runs over Joseph with the town clerk's car, seemingly reducing him to a puddle. D'arcy learns her father Gerald has been hospitalized. She briefly revisits Elliot to tell him she has made peace with his new relationship and wants to do something bold. Harry announces to Asta that he has finished the bomb, then hypnotizes Kate to gather intel on the Greys. He decides to wake her up with full memory of her abduction experience, including seeing her baby. General McCallister visits his cabin, and they find his bomb has gone missing. D'arcy is seen driving with the bomb.
34	8	"Homecoming"	Robert Duncan McNeill	Chris Sheridan & Robert Duncan McNeill	April 3, 2024	0.622
In a Grey prison cell, a Mantid, a mantis-like shapeshifting alien, eats the head of another alien prisoner. D'arcy takes Harry's bomb to the Greys' base, wanders into a portal to the Greys' mother ship and gets captured. Ben and Kate open up to each other about their abduction experiences and the tracking devices in their bodies, but Kate decides not to undergo surgery to remove hers, as it is her only connection to their baby. Joseph decides to help Harry stop the Greys after he finds out about their plans to make the Earth uninhabitable to all other life forms, including Grey-human hybrids. Harry, Asta, Joseph, and Bridget arrive at the base. Asta uses a remote to activate a portal and go after D'arcy against Harry's warning. Joseph steals another remote from a Grey-human hybrid and gives it to Harry and Bridget so they can enter the portal as well. He then uses Harry's alien ball to transform the geyser water into sand, foiling the Greys' plan. Aboard the Greys' ship, Harry rescues Asta and D'arcy from prison cells and even encounters Robert. He lets Bridget brutally kill several Greys, while D'arcy wanders off with an abducted Kate to locate her child. The ladies find Kate's baby in a room full of abducted babies, and although the Greys capture Kate, D'arcy absconds with the baby and reunites with Asta. As Robert stays behind, Asta and D'arcy rejoin Harry, who has abandoned Bridget, aboard an escape ship with the Greys in pursuit, and they realize their mother ship is actually Earth's Moon. Back on Earth, Asta and Dan celebrate Harry's victory at the diner, but Harry is uncharacteristically repulsed by the free pie Dan gives him. Joseph battles Peter, now an indestructible cyborg who regains consciousness when he recognizes Joseph, demanding to know Robert's whereabouts. Mike and Liv search for the missing Joseph and run into Lena, who makes up with Mike and shares a kiss before they return to work. Later, Peter invites Liv to the outskirts of the town's mine. Mike investigates an alien ship's crash site and defends himself from what he is shocked to see is a Grey. General McCallister enters a portal using a remote Peter took from Joseph. D'arcy delivers Ben and Kate's baby to their doorstep. Sahar takes Max to apologize to Harry, but he screams when he sees the apparently escaped Mantid behind "Harry's" human form. Harry and Bridget are then shown to be captured in the Greys' Moon base.

=== Season 4 (2025) ===
No. overall	No. in season	Title	Directed by	Written by	Original release date	U.S. viewers (millions)
35	1	"Prisoners"	Alan Tudyk	Chris Sheridan	June 6, 2025	0.184 (Syfy) 0.351 (USA)
One month after returning to Earth, the Mantid has assumed "Harry's" life, while Harry and Bridget remain trapped on the Moon base. Asta and Joseph wake up in bed after a night together; Joseph has fallen in love with Asta, disturbing her. It is revealed that D'arcy did not return Ben and Kate's baby to them, reasoning that the Greys are continuing to visit them and would simply take the baby back if they found it there; D'arcy eventually gives the baby to Kayla for safekeeping. Ben and Kate suspect that Joseph knows the whereabouts of the baby, and urge Liv to investigate sightings of Joseph, as Mike is on a leave of absence in the belief that he hallucinated his previous encounter with the alien. Eventually, Harry's friendly jailor, a Grey named Bruce, agrees to release him and Bridget if they agree to take him to see Earth. Harry returns to confront the Mantid at the cabin, but discovers that he is unable to return to his alien form.
36	2	"The Lonely Man"	Alan Tudyk	Kelechi Urama	June 13, 2025	0.141 (Syfy) 0.317 (USA)
After Harry, Asta, Bridget, Max, and Sahar escape the Mantid, Sahar speculates that the Greys placed an inhibitor device on Harry to trap him in his human form. Lacking a way to fight the Mantid, Harry moves into Asta and D'arcy's house in Patience for safety. At the clinic, Joseph proposes marriage to Asta, embarrassing her; she reluctantly convinces him to fight the Mantid, but the Mantid easily defeats him, leaving him heavily scarred. After the fight, the Mantid sheds "Harry's" form and retreats to the woods, where he begins to kill and eat local residents, leading to fears of a serial killer. Mike returns to duty and, after re-examining the evidence surrounding his encounter with the alien the previous month, reluctantly concludes that aliens could exist. Asta and Harry travel to Las Vegas to ask Bruce what the Greys did to Harry, only to find him disintegrating from Earth's inhospitable atmosphere. Before his death, Bruce explains that the Greys harvested Harry's alien essence, leaving him unable to change forms, and might return it if Harry provided them with alien technology from Harry's home planet. Harry understands that the purpose of the technology is so the Greys can destroy Harry's alien race, but plans to provide it anyway.
37	3	"Ties That Bind"	Brennan Shroff	Alexandra Lazarowich	June 20, 2025	N/A
Harry and D'arcy use a portal to travel back in time to 1970 to find an alien beacon that Harry knows was dropped onto a beach in Maine. Unexpectedly, the two run into General McCallister, who has beaten them to the beacon. McCallister reveals that she is the daughter of a lighthouse keeper who saw the alien spaceship that dropped the device, then was ridiculed after he was unable to prove it, ultimately leading to his depression and suicide; she aims to prove that what he saw was real. However, after he rejects the beacon as evidence, she offers it to Harry and D'arcy, deciding to remain with him and convincing her younger self to support him. Harry and D'arcy prepare to return to the present, but after Harry reveals that the deal with the Greys would result in the annihilation of his race, D'arcy convinces him not to go through with it, throwing the beacon into the sea. In the present, Max and Sahar clash over leadership of Patience's school "Alien Club," and Max steals Bridget from Sahar to hunt the Mantid in the woods. The Mantid easily defeats them and prepares to eat Max, but is unexpectedly killed by Heather, who returned to Earth to find Harry.
38	4	"Truth Hurts"	Brennan Shroff	Cherry Chevapravatdumrong	June 27, 2025	N/A
Harry adjusts to living in his human body when Heather unexpectedly returns with their six hybrid children. He begins to experience confusing feelings toward Heather and pretends to be attracted to her, even suggesting that she return to her human form. Meanwhile, D'arcy and Asta secretly bury the mantid body. Kate grows suspicious that D'arcy may be in a situation similar to her own and takes Ben to investigate her, which drives D'arcy into a panic and leads her to Harry's clinic. There, Harry reveals that he has already hypnotized Kate and is aware of the situation. At the same time, Liv installs cameras in an attempt to capture proof of alien activity. Harry eventually tells Heather that he is now permanently human and can no longer change back into his alien form. Despite this, Heather proposes to him, and he briefly accepts before explaining that their relationship cannot work. He recites a poem before breaking things off. Later, Greys disguised as Girl Scouts inform Kate that, even though she removed her implant, they are still able to monitor her.
39	5	"The Human Condition"	Sydney Freeland	Joey Gutierrez	July 4, 2025	0.364 (USA)
Harry begins adjusting to a typical human lifestyle by jogging in the middle of the road, decorating his house, and discovering social media, but feels lonely. With no further attacks, the Mantid murder case is reassigned to another department. Liv continues Peter's podcast, "The Alien Tracker," with her own twists; Mike accidentally discovers her, but encourages her to continue. At a bar, Harry unsuccessfully attempts to flirt with bookstore worker Lydia until Mike steps in and tries to teach him how to approach women. Asta encourages Dan to rejoin his band for a local music festival, agreeing to look after the diner until his return. Out of nowhere, Harry proposes to Asta, but she suggests that he spend time with Bridget to deal with his loneliness. Harry attempts to bond with Bridget, much to Bridget's embarrassment. Kate discovers Liv's podcast and shares the similarity of her story with Robert's with Ben. Ben invites Liv to dinner to discuss aliens, but the plan is ruined when Mike shows up uninvited with chicken and wine. After dinner, Mike discovers a hidden camera in Ben and Kate's drawing room, shocking everyone. Kate then reveals to Mike and Liv that aliens abducted her baby. D'arcy applies to adopt a dog, but her application is rejected; D'arcy and Judy attempt to break into the dog shelter, breaking the window, setting off the alarm, and leaving D'arcy's credit card behind. At the diner, Asta gives D'arcy money to take to the bank for a deposit, but D'arcy instead goes drinking with Judy, passes out in the bar, and loses the money, leaving her despondent. After a more successful fishing trip with Bridget, Harry visits Asta's diner while trying to encourage her, but suddenly vanishes while eating pie.
40	6	"Soul Providers"	Sydney Freeland	Nastaran Dibai & Aaron Wiener	July 11, 2025	0.166 (Syfy) 0.333 (USA)
Harry is summoned to the Galactic Housing Council, learning that the Greys have brought a lawsuit against him for stealing Ben and Kate's baby from them and inadvertently releasing the Mantid. Harry reveals the location of the baby and promises to defeat the Mantid in exchange for the charges against him being dropped, reasoning that it has already died and he can simply turn over its corpse. However, after returning to Earth, he discovers that the Mantid rejuvenated in its grave and has escaped once more. Realizing that the Greys are on their way to the baby's location, Harry rushes to rescue it. D'arcy and Judy search for the missing money, but are unable to find it; D'arcy lies to Asta and claims it was deposited. After Asta believes her unquestioningly, D'arcy has a breakdown and contemplates suicide, but Harry reassures her of her worth, reflecting on his own human transformation and realizing that he has developed a human soul. D'arcy swears off alcohol and begins to attend Alcoholics Anonymous meetings; at the same time, Asta recovers the lost money and realizes that D'arcy lied to her. Harry uses his soul as a bargaining chip once he returns to the Galactic Housing Council, offering it as collateral against the baby's; the Greys agree to end their demand for the baby's return, and Asta and Kayla secretly deliver it to Ben and Kate. The council also agrees to return Harry's alien essence, but appoint an executor to administer its return: Harry's alien father.
41	7	"Daddy Issues"	Nastaran Dibai	Donald Todd & Elias Benavidez	July 18, 2025	0.219 (Syfy) 0.382 (USA)
After returning to Earth, Harry and his father clash over Harry's perceived weakness and reluctance to kill, and Harry's father refuses to return his essence until he has murdered a human. Harry reluctantly agrees to do so, and makes aborted attempts to kill Dr. Smallwood and Jimmy, but is unable to do so. Asta confronts D'arcy over her lie about the money, but forgives her. While investigating an animal victim of the Mantid in the woods, Mike speculates that the Mantid could have taken the identity of a law enforcement official to close down the investigation into the serial killer, and grows suspicious of Jules. In the process, he attempts to tell Lena about the alien, but she is unconvinced. Mike convinces Liv to spend an evening with Jules to see if she remembers events from their shared childhood; Jules passes the test, but later corners Mike and reveals herself as the Mantid, as well as her invulnerability to bullets. After Harry's father realizes that Max can see aliens' true forms, he kidnaps him and presses Harry to kill him; Harry kills his father instead, saving Max and regaining his essence. He returns to alien form, but is seen by Ben and Kate.
42	8	"Mine Town"	Nastaran Dibai	Nastaran Dibai	July 25, 2025	0.191 (Syfy) 0.395 (USA)
Mike and Liv hunt for the Mantid, reasoning that it plans to attack the upcoming annual mining festival. They also discover camera footage of Asta and Harry digging for the Mantid's corpse, although Harry's identity is unclear; they speculate that Asta is trying to protect another alien, and reason that it is Harry. Asta begins to consider leaving Patience to see more of the world, but shelves the plan after D'arcy begs her to stay. Harry asks Ben for Max's help confronting the Mantid, as he is the only person in Patience who can reliably identify it, but Ben refuses to allow it. At the festival, Mike and Harry confront one another, but agree to work together to kill the Mantid. They are urged to enter the Patience mine by Liv, who Max sees is the Mantid in disguise.
43	9	"Tunnel Vision"	Robert Duncan McNeill	Donald Todd	August 1, 2025	0.226 (Syfy) 0.275 (USA)
Harry, Mike, Asta, Max, Ben, and Kate separately enter the mine to confront the Mantid. In an effort to turn the humans against each other, the Mantid takes on a series of disguises; after these attempts are foiled, Harry and the Mantid fight openly, and Harry defeats it with help from the humans, although Asta is poisoned in the process. The Mantid reveals that it had already laid its egg sac, and it is nearing its scheduled hatching time, with a kidnapped Liv and Robert as the young mantids' food source. Harry and Mike successfully find the egg sac in time and destroy it with Peter's assistance. Harry is able to use his alien blood as a treatment of the Mantid's poison, saving Asta's life. Reflecting on her near-death experience, Asta recommits to leaving Patience, and Harry concludes he must leave as well and return to Heather on her home planet.
44	10	"The End Is Here"	Robert Duncan McNeill	Chris Sheridan	August 8, 2025	0.364 (USA)
On his way to Patience to kill Harry, a psychotic Dr. Stone is killed when an alien ship crash-lands on his car. The alien within, a member of Harry's race, takes on Dr. Stone's identity. Harry has second thoughts about leaving after learning that he will be replaced as the town doctor. Meanwhile, Asta has premonitions of the day's events, and realizes that she foresaw the alien ship crash; at the crash site, the government's alien program, now overseen by Logan and Hill, discovers an annihilation device similar to Harry's. Harry infuriates Mike and Liv by revealing that he implanted false memories into their heads months earlier, and Mike unsuccessfully attempts to arrest Harry; Harry makes amends by arranging for Mike's false memory to come true. Harry confronts the alien in Dr. Stone's form in Joe's Diner, and the alien indicates his desire to destroy humanity on Earth, completing Harry's original mission. Although Harry contemplates killing him to prevent this outcome, he and his friends take the alien out drinking instead, showing him compassion and beginning to convince him of humanity's value (with Dan speculating that Harry was likely not the first alien to be dissuaded from exterminating Earth after visiting). In the end, Asta opts to leave Patience to join a nurses' NGO in Louisiana; Kate returns to practicing environmental law; D'arcy begins to mentor a young skier and recovering alcoholic; Mike and Liv are inducted into the government's alien program; and Harry and Bridget use the other alien's spaceship to leave Earth, returning to Heather and their children.

== Production ==
=== Development ===
Series creator Chris Sheridan stated that he was inspired to start the Resident Alien television project after reading the novels and comic book series of the same name. Upon being interviewed at a Television Critics Association panel in January 2020, he also stated that his real inspiration came from an aerial phenomenon "close encounter" he and his wife witnessed while honeymooning in the Bahamas twenty years ago.

On May 31, 2018, Syfy announced that the TV adaptation of Resident Alien was given a pilot order with Chris Sheridan as the show creator and Universal Cable Productions, Dark Horse Entertainment, and Amblin Television developing the pilot. On February 28, 2019, Syfy gave a series order with production starting in Vancouver, and David Dobkin directing and serving as an executive producer for the pilot. Robert Duncan McNeill executive produced and was producing director for the remaining episodes. On March 17, 2021, Syfy renewed the series for a second season, which premiered on January 26, 2022, and was split into two eight-episode parts; the second half premiered on August 10, 2022.

On July 21, 2022, Syfy renewed the series for a 12-episode third season. On November 15, 2022, Syfy reduced the number of episodes in the third season from 12 to 8. On June 18, 2024, it was announced that the series was renewed for a fourth season and would be simulcast on USA Network which premiered June 6, 2025. On July 24, 2025, Sheridan confirmed that the fourth season would be the final season of the series.

=== Casting ===
On September 20, 2018, Alan Tudyk was cast as the main character "Dr. Harry Vanderspeigle" in the pilot, along with Sara Tomko, Corey Reynolds, Alice Wetterlund, and Levi Fiehler. On January 31, 2020, Linda Hamilton, Mandell Maughan, and Alex Barima were cast in the recurring roles in the series. On February 12, 2020, Elizabeth Bowen was cast in the recurring role of Deputy Sheriff Liv Baker in the series.

=== Filming ===
Principal photography for the first season began on September 10, 2020, and concluded on October 14, 2020, in Delta, British Columbia, Canada. Filming for the second season began on August 3, 2021, and concluded on April 1, 2022. Filming for the first half of the second season took place in Ladysmith, British Columbia, with filming for the second half taking place from February 27, 2022. Filming for the third season began on January 30, 2023, and had concluded on May 2, 2023. Filming for the fourth season began on December 2, 2024 and concluded on March 31, 2025.

== Release ==
On February 13, 2020, Syfy announced that the series would premiere in summer 2020. However, on October 9, 2020, the premiere was moved to January 2021, specifically January 27 in the United States. Internationally, the series premiered in Canada on CTV Sci-Fi Channel on January 27, 2021, and in the United Kingdom on Sky One the following day.

== Reception ==
=== Critical response ===
For the first season, review aggregator Rotten Tomatoes reported an approval rating of 94% based on 31 critic reviews, with an average rating of 7.8/10. The website's critics consensus reads, "Resident Alien takes a minute to settle into its skin, but once it does it finds fresh humor in a familiar framework and proves a perfect showcase for Alan Tudyk's singular comedic skills". Metacritic gave the first season a weighted average score of 70 out of 100 based on 15 critic reviews, indicating "generally favorable reviews". For the second season, Rotten Tomatoes reported an approval rating of 100% based on 5 critic reviews, with an average rating of 7.7/10. For the fourth season, Rotten Tomatoes reported an approval rating of 100% based on 7 critic reviews, with an average rating of 7.8/10.

=== Ratings ===
==== Season 1 ====
Viewership and ratings per episode of Resident Alien
No.	Title	Air date	Rating (18–49)	Viewers (millions)	DVR (18–49)	DVR viewers (millions)	Total (18–49)	Total viewers (millions)
1	"Pilot"	January 27, 2021	0.2	1.08	—N/a	—N/a	—N/a	—N/a
2	"Homesick"	February 3, 2021	0.2	1.22	0.3	1.55	0.5	2.77 (Note: Live +7 ratings were not available, so Live +3 ratings have been used instead.)
3	"Secrets"	February 10, 2021	0.2	0.88	—N/a	1.23	—N/a	2.10
4	"Birds of a Feather"	February 17, 2021	0.2	1.02	0.4	1.91	0.6	2.92
5	"Love Language"	February 24, 2021	0.2	1.24	0.4	1.87	0.6	3.11
6	"Sexy Beast"	March 3, 2021	0.2	1.20	0.4	2.11	0.6	3.31
7	"The Green Glow"	March 10, 2021	0.2	1.07	0.3	1.90	0.5	2.97
8	"End of the World As We Know It"	March 17, 2021	0.2	1.27	—N/a	—N/a	—N/a	—N/a
9	"Welcome Aliens"	March 24, 2021	0.2	1.16	—N/a	—N/a	—N/a	—N/a
10	"Heroes of Patience"	March 31, 2021	0.1	1.14	—N/a	—N/a	—N/a	—N/a

=== Accolades ===
Award	Year (Note: Indicates the year of ceremony. Each year is linked to the article about the awards held that year, wherever possible.)	Category	Nominee(s) / Work	Result	Ref(s)
Academy of Science Fiction, Fantasy and Horror Films Saturn Awards	2022	Best Science Fiction Television Series – Network/cable	Resident Alien	Nominated	
Critics Choice Association's (CCA) Super Awards	2022	Best Science Fiction/Fantasy Series	Resident Alien	Nominated	
Critics Choice Association's (CCA) Super Awards	2022	Best Actor in a Science Fiction/Fantasy Series	Alan Tudyk	Nominated	
Dragon Con's Dragon Awards	2021	Best Science Fiction or Fantasy TV Series	Resident Alien	Nominated	
Hollywood Critics Association (HCA) Television Awards	2021	Best Cable Series, Comedy	Resident Alien	Won	
Hollywood Critics Association (HCA) Television Awards	2021	Best Actor in a Broadcast Network or Cable Series, Comedy	Alan Tudyk	Nominated	
Hollywood Critics Association (HCA) Television Awards	2021	Best Supporting Actor in a Broadcast Network or Cable Series, Comedy	Corey Reynolds	Nominated	
Hollywood Critics Association (HCA) Television Awards	2021	Best Supporting Actress in a Broadcast Network or Cable Series, Comedy	Alice Wetterlund	Nominated	
Hollywood Critics Association (HCA) Television Awards	2022	Best Cable Series, Comedy	Resident Alien	Nominated	
Hollywood Critics Association (HCA) Television Awards	2023	Best Actor in a Broadcast Network or Cable Series, Comedy	Alan Tudyk	Nominated	
International Press Academy's Satellite Awards	2022	Best Actor in a Comedy or Musical Series	Alan Tudyk	Nominated	
The Joey Awards	2022	Best Guest Star Performer Portraying a Female in a TV Show – 10+ Years	Jessica Halliburton	Nominated	
The Joey Awards	2022	Best Guest Star Performer Portraying a Female in a TV Show – 9 Years	Alix West Lefler	Nominated	
Leo Awards	2022	Best Direction – Music, Comedy or Variety Program or Series	Shannon Kohli (for "Welcome Aliens")	Won	
Young Artist Association's Young Artist Awards	2022	Best Performance in a TV Series: Leading Youth Artist	Judah Prehn	Won	
Young Artist Association's Young Artist Awards	2022	Best Performance in a TV Series: Supporting Young Artist	Gracelyn Awad Rinke	Won	
