= The Jazz Standards: A Guide to the Repertoire =

2012 music history book by Ted Gioia

- Cover
- Author: Ted Gioia
- Language: English
- Subject: Jazz
- Genre: Non-fiction; Encyclopedic; Reference
- Publisher: Oxford University Press
- Publication date: 27 September 2012
- Publication place: United States
- Pages: 544
- ISBN: 0199937397

The Jazz Standards: A Guide to the Repertoire is a 2012 book by Ted Gioia documenting what he considers to be the most important tunes in the jazz repertoire. The book is published by Oxford University Press. The book features a range of jazz standards in alphabetical order, from Broadway show tunes by the likes of George Gershwin and Irving Berlin, to the standards of esteemed jazz musicians such as Duke Ellington, John Coltrane, Miles Davis, Thelonious Monk, Wayne Shorter and Charles Mingus. In the book, Gioia has recommendations for definitive covers of each standard to listen to, more than 2000 in total. Each jazz standard entry in the book contains descriptive text and selected discography.

== Background ==
Gioia writes in his introduction to The Jazz Standards that he was inspired to write the book because of the difficulties he encountered as an aspiring jazz musician in his youth when he would turn up to jam sessions and feel embarrassed at not knowing the tunes and not having a list or any kind of reference he could use to learn the expected repertoire. As he goes on to say, "I soon realized what countless other jazz musicians have no doubt also learned: in-depth study of the jazz repertoire is hardly a quaint historical sideline, but essential for survival. Not learning these songs puts a jazz player on a quick path to unemployment." Gioia's purpose in writing the book was to provide a "type of survey, the kind of overview of the standard repertoire that I wished someone had given me back in the day—a guide that would have helped me as a musician, as a critic, as a historian, and simply as a fan and lover of the jazz idiom."

== Reviews ==
The Telegraph states that it is a "comprehensive guide to the most important jazz compositions, is a unique resource, a browser's companion, and an invaluable introduction to the art form", adding that "musicians who play these songs night after night now have a handy guide, outlining their history and significance and telling how they have been performed by different generations of jazz artists", and is described as such on the Toronto Public Library website. Clive Davis writing for The Independent noted that "Apart from his elegant prose style, the first thing you notice about Ted Gioia's approach to his subject is that the music clearly gives him no end of pleasure", and that the book contains numerous "witty" personal anecdotes of Gioia's experience of the tunes. He considers The Jazz Standards: A Guide to the Repertoire a "bold attempt to summarise the core repertoire". The London Review of Bookshops wrote that the book would "appeal to a wide audience, serving as a fascinating introduction for new fans, an invaluable and long-needed handbook for jazz lovers and musicians, and an indispensable reference for students and educators". Dennis Drabelle of The Washington Post remarked that it was "hard to quarrel with Gioia’s seemingly encyclopedic knowledge of what is still hot or not" but was critical of some of his omissions of information, such as failing to mention that "I Can't Give You Anything but Love, Baby" was prominent in the Howard Hawks comedy Bringing Up Baby (1938).

== Standards ==
The following standards are listed in the book:

1. After You've Gone
2. Ain't Misbehavin'
3. Airegin
4. Alfie
5. All Blues
6. All of Me
7. All of You
8. All the Things You Are
9. Almost Like Being in Love
10. Alone Together
11. Along Came Betty
12. Angel Eyes
13. April in Paris
14. Autumn in New York
15. Autumn Leaves
16. Bags' Groove
17. Basin Street Blues
18. Beale Street Blues
19. Bemsha Swing
20. Billie's Bounce
21. Birdland
22. Blue Bossa
23. Blue in Green
24. Blue Monk
25. Blue Moon
26. Blue Skies
27. Blues in the Night
28. Bluesette
29. Body and Soul
30. But Beautiful
31. But Not For Me
32. Bye Bye Blackbird
33. C Jam Blues
34. Cantaloupe Island
35. Caravan
36. Chelsea Bridge
37. Cherokee
38. A Child Is Born
39. Come Rain or Come Shine
40. Come Sunday
41. Con Alma
42. Confirmation
43. Corcovado
44. Cotton Tail
45. Darn That Dream
46. Days of Wine and Roses
47. Desafinado
48. Dinah
49. Django
50. Do Nothing till You Hear from Me
51. Do You Know What It Means to Miss New Orleans?
52. Dolphin Dance
53. Donna Lee
54. Don't Blame Me
55. Don't Get Around Much Anymore
56. East of the Sun (and West of the Moon)
57. Easy Living
58. Easy to Love
59. Embraceable You
60. Emily
61. Epistrophy
62. Everything Happens to Me
63. Evidence
64. Ev'ry Time We Say Goodbye
65. Exactly Like You
66. Falling In Love With Love
67. Fascinating Rhythm
68. Fly Me to the Moon
69. A Foggy Day
70. Footprints
71. Gee, Baby, Ain't I Good to You
72. Georgia On My Mind
73. Ghost of a Chance
74. Giant Steps
75. The Girl From Ipanema
76. God Bless the Child
77. Gone With the Wind
78. Good Morning Heartache
79. Goodbye Pork Pie Hat
80. Groovin' High
81. Have You Met Miss Jones?
82. Here's That Rainy Day
83. Honeysuckle Rose
84. Hot House
85. How Deep Is The Ocean?
86. How High The Moon
87. How Insensitive
88. How Long Has This Been Going On?
89. I Can't Get Started
90. I Can't Give You Anything But Love
91. I Cover the Waterfront
92. I Didn't Know What Time It Was
93. I Fall In Love Too Easily
94. I Got It Bad (and That Ain't Good)
95. I Got Rhythm
96. I Hear a Rhapsody
97. I Let a Song Go Out of My Heart
98. I Love You
99. I Mean You
100. I Only Have Eyes For You
101. I Remember Clifford
102. I Should Care
103. I Surrender, Dear
104. I Thought About You
105. I Want to Be Happy
106. If I Should Lose You
107. If You Could See Me Now
108. I'll Remember April
109. I'm in the Mood for Love
110. Impressions
111. In a Mellow Tone
112. In a Sentimental Mood
113. In Your Own Sweet Way
114. Indiana
115. Invitation
116. It Could Happen to You
117. It Don't Mean a Thing (If It Ain't Got That Swing)
118. It Had to Be You
119. It Might as Well Be Spring
120. It Never Entered My Mind
121. I've Found a New Baby
122. Jitterbug Waltz
123. Joy Spring
124. Just Friends
125. Just One of Those Things
126. Just You, Just Me
127. King Porter Stomp
128. Lady Bird
129. The Lady Is a Tramp
130. Lament
131. Laura
132. Lester Leaps In
133. Like Someone in Love
134. Limehouse Blues
135. Liza
136. Lonely Woman
137. Lotus Blossom
138. Love for Sale
139. Love Is Here to Stay
140. Lover
141. Lover, Come Back to Me
142. Lover Man
143. Lullaby of Birdland
144. Lush Life
145. Mack the Knife
146. Maiden Voyage
147. The Man I Love
148. Manhã de Carnaval
149. Mean to Me
150. Meditation
151. Memories of You
152. Milestones
153. Misterioso
154. Misty
155. Moanin'
156. Moment's Notice
157. Mood Indigo
158. Moonlight in Vermont
159. Moose the Mooche
160. More Than You Know
161. Muskrat Ramble
162. My Favorite Things
163. My Foolish Heart
164. My Funny Valentine
165. My Heart Stood Still
166. My Old Flame
167. My One and Only Love
168. My Romance
169. Naima
170. Nardis
171. Nature Boy
172. The Nearness of You
173. Nice Work If You Can Get It
174. Night and Day
175. Night in Tunisia
176. Night Train
177. Now's the Time
178. Nuages
179. Oh, Lady Be Good!
180. Old Folks
181. Oleo
182. On a Clear Day
183. On Green Dolphin Street
184. On the Sunny Side of the Street
185. Once I Loved
186. One Note Samba
187. One O'Clock Jump
188. Ornithology
189. Out of Nowhere
190. Over the Rainbow
191. Peace
192. The Peacocks
193. Pennies From Heaven
194. Perdido
195. Poinciana
196. Polka Dots and Moonbeams
197. Prelude to a Kiss
198. Rhythm-a-ning
199. 'Round Midnight
200. Royal Garden Blues
201. Ruby, My Dear
202. St. James Infirmary
203. St. Louis Blues
204. St. Thomas
205. Satin Doll
206. Scrapple from the Apple
207. Secret Love
208. The Shadow of Your Smile
209. Shine
210. Skylark
211. Smile
212. Smoke Gets In Your Eyes
213. So What
214. Softly, as in a Morning Sunrise
215. Solar
216. Solitude
217. Some of These Days
218. Someday My Prince Will Come
219. Someone to Watch Over Me
220. Song for My Father
221. The Song Is You
222. Sophisticated Lady
223. Soul Eyes
224. Speak Low
225. Spring Can Really Hang You Up the Most
226. Spring Is Here
227. Stardust
228. Star Eyes
229. Stella By Starlight
230. Stolen Moments
231. Stompin' at the Savoy
232. Stormy Weather
233. Straight No Chaser
234. Struttin' with Some Barbecue
235. Summertime
236. Sweet Georgia Brown
237. 'S Wonderful
238. Take Five
239. Take the A Train
240. Tea For Two
241. Tenderly
242. There Is No Greater Love
243. There Will Never Be Another You
244. These Foolish Things
245. They Can't Take That Away from Me
246. Things Ain't What They Used to Be
247. Tiger Rag
248. Time After Time
249. Tin Roof Blues
250. The Very Thought of You
251. Waltz For Debby
252. Watermelon Man
253. Wave
254. The Way You Look Tonight
255. Well, You Needn't
256. What Is This Thing Called Love?
257. What's New?
258. When the Saints Go Marching In
259. Whisper Not
260. Who Can I Turn To?
261. Willow Weep For Me
262. Yardbird Suite
263. Yesterdays
264. You Don't Know What Love Is
265. You Go To My Head
266. You Stepped Out of a Dream
267. You'd Be So Nice to Come Home To
