= Ted Gioia =

American jazz critic, music historian, and writer (born 1957)

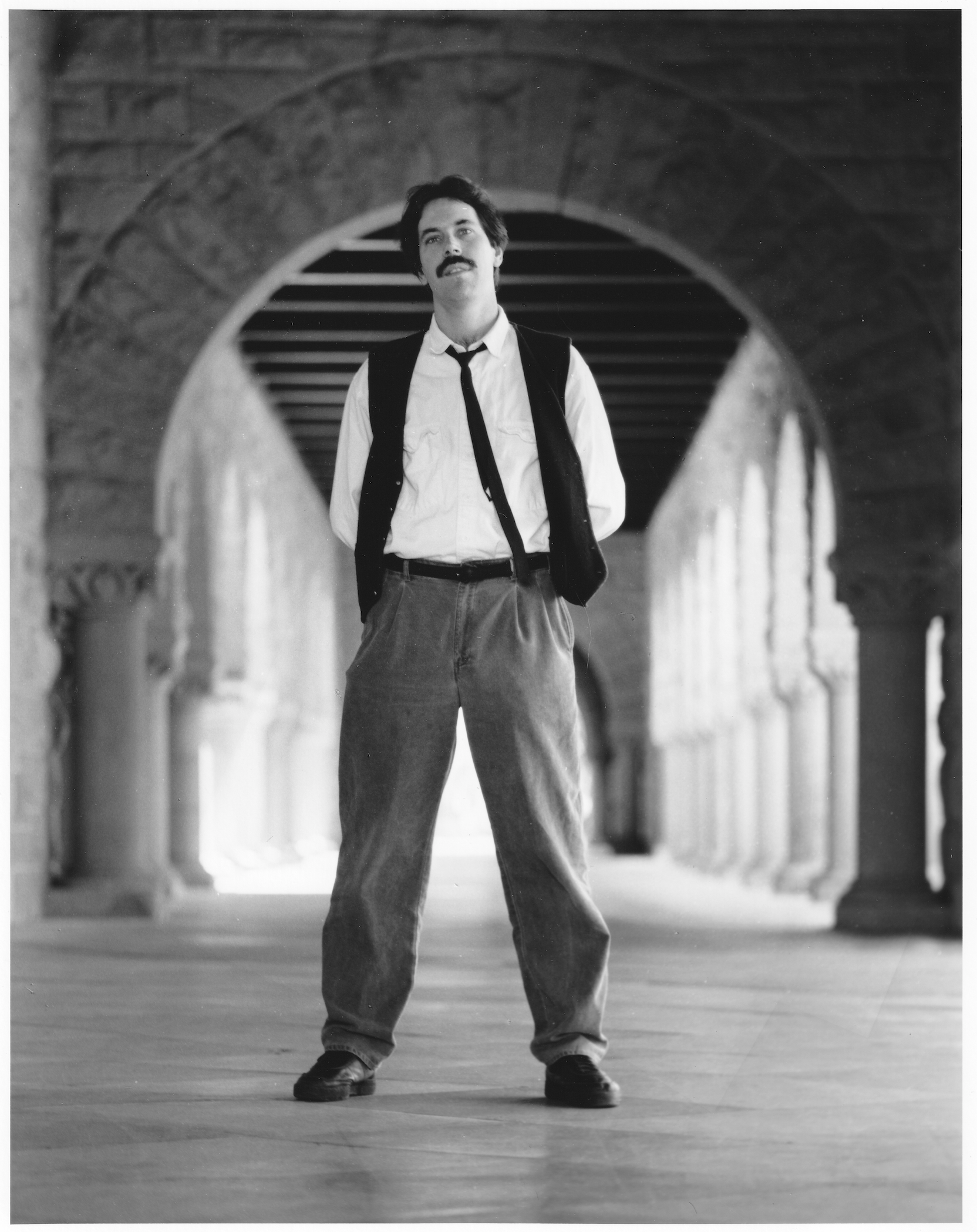
- Gioia in 1991 at the main quad of Stanford University
- Born: October 21, 1957 (age 69); Hawthorne, California, U.S.
- Education: Stanford University (BA); University of Oxford (MA); Stanford Business School (MBA)
- Occupations: Music historian; jazz critic; writer
- Relatives: Dana Gioia (brother)
- Writing career
- Notable works: The Birth (and Death) of the Cool (2009); Work Songs (2006); Healing Songs (2006); Love Songs: The Hidden History (2015)
- Musical career
- Genre: Jazz
- Occupations: Musician; composer
- Instrument: Piano
- Label: Quartet
- Website: www.tedgioia.com

Ted Gioia (/ˈdʒɔɪ.ə/ JOY-ə; born October 21, 1957) is an American jazz critic and music historian. He is author of 12 books, including Music: A Subversive History, The Jazz Standards: A Guide to the Repertoire, The History of Jazz, and Delta Blues. He is also a jazz musician and one of the founders of Stanford University's jazz studies program.

== Early life and education ==
Gioia grew up in an Italian-Mexican household in Hawthorne, California, and later earned degrees from Stanford University and the University of Oxford, as well as a Master of Business Administration (MBA) from the Stanford Graduate School of Business.

== Career ==
After graduating from Stanford Business School in 1984, Gioia served as an adviser to Fortune 500 companies while with the Boston Consulting Group and McKinsey & Company, and as an executive with Pilkington Visioncare, Sola Optical, and Essilor. When Gioia worked amidst Silicon Valley's venture capital community on Sand Hill Road, he was known as the "guy with the piano in his office." Gioia is also owner of one of the largest collections of research materials on jazz and ethnic music in the Western United States.

Gioia is the author of several books on music, including Music: A Subversive History (2019), West Coast Jazz (1992), The Jazz Standards: A Guide to the Repertoire (2012), and The Birth (and Death) of the Cool (2009). A second updated and expanded edition of The History of Jazz was published by Oxford University Press in 2011, and a third revised edition was issued in 2021. Love Songs: The Hidden History, published by Oxford University Press in 2015, is a survey of the music of courtship, romance, and sexuality; it completes a trilogy of books on the social history of music that includes Work Songs (2006) and Healing Songs (2006). All three books have been honored with ASCAP's Deems Taylor Award. In his study of love songs, Gioia contends that innovations in the history of this music came from Africa and the Middle East.

In 2006, Gioia was the first to expose, in an article in the Los Angeles Times, the FBI files on folk-and-roots music icon Alan Lomax. He founded the website jazz.com in December 2007 and served as president and editor until 2010.

Gioia is also a jazz pianist and composer. He has produced recordings featuring Bobby Hutcherson, John Handy, and Buddy Montgomery. His music was featured in the final season of the TV series Better Call Saul.

== Books ==
- Music: A Subversive History, Basic Books (2019)
- The Jazz Standards: A Guide to the Repertoire
- The History of Jazz, Oxford University Press
- How to Listen to Jazz
- The Birth (and Death) of the Cool
- Delta Blues: The Life and Times of the Mississippi Masters Who Revolutionized American Music
- West Coast Jazz: Modern Jazz in California, 1945–1960
- The Imperfect Art: Reflections on Jazz and Modern Culture
- Love Songs: The Hidden History
- Work Songs
- Healing Songs

== Selected discography ==
- The End of the Open Road, Ted Gioia Trio, Quartet Records Q1001 (1988); OCLC 32182337 (Recorded June 9–11, 1986, and October 19, 1987, Menlo Park, California)
- Tango Cool, Ted Gioia Trio, Quartet Records QCD1006 (1990); OCLC 23948930 (Recorded March 31, 1989, and April 7, 1990, San Francisco)
- The City is a Chinese Vase (1998)

== Awards and honors ==
- Lifetime Achievement Award in Jazz Journalism, Jazz Journalists Association, 2017
- The Dallas Morning News has called Ted Gioia "one of the outstanding music historians in America." His concept of "post-cool" described in his book The Birth (and Death) of the Cool, was selected as one of the Big Ideas of 2012 by Adbusters magazine.
- ASCAP Deems Taylor Award: The Imperfect Art (1989), Work Songs (2006), Healing Songs (2006), Love Songs: The Hidden History (2015).

== Personal life ==
Gioia is the brother of poet Dana Gioia.
