= Sofia Hoffmann =

Portuguese singer, songwriter and multi-instrumentalist (born 1980)

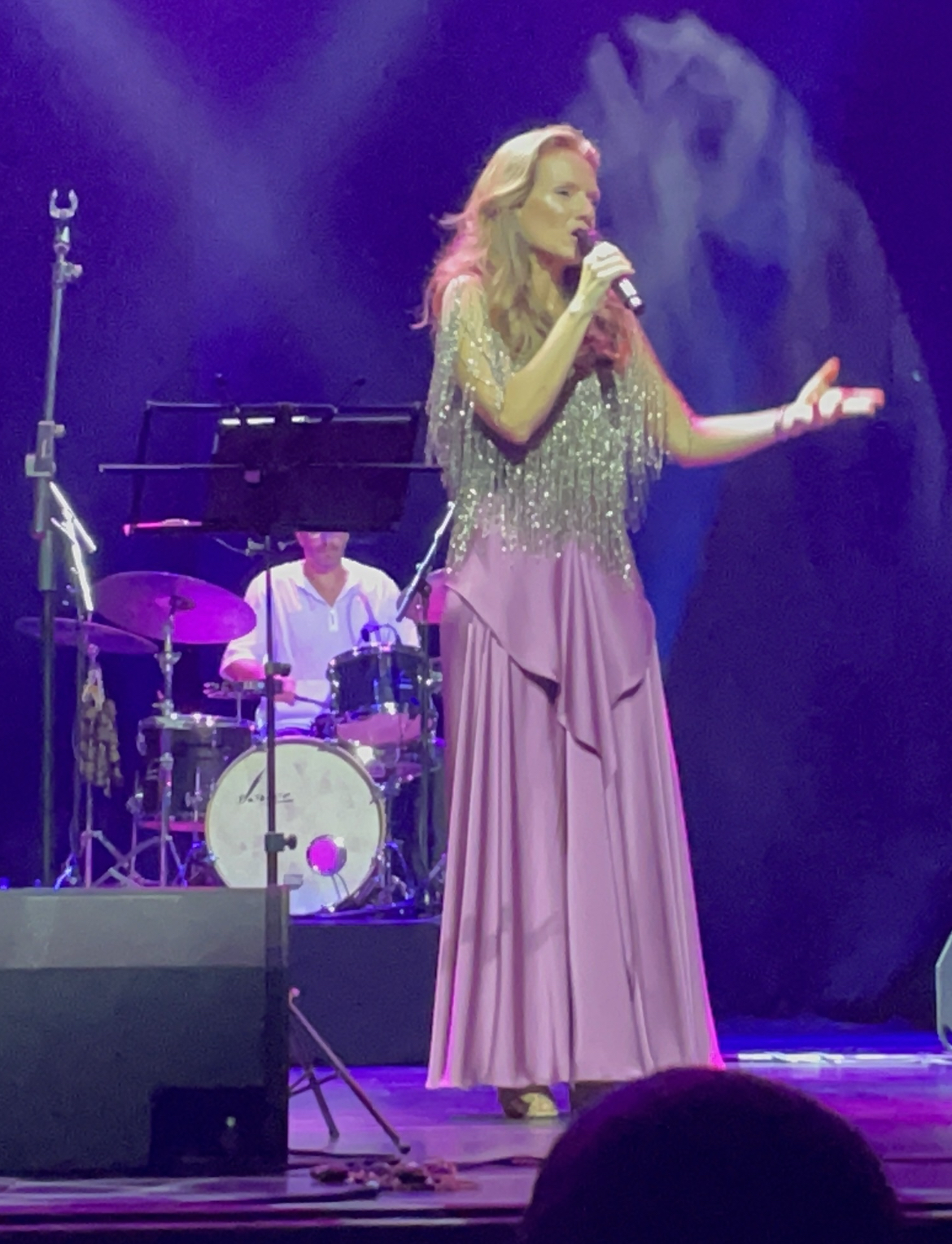
- Sofia Hoffmann in 2022
- Born: Sofia Hoffmann de Mendonça; January 16, 1980 (age 46); Lisbon, Portugal
- Education: Universidade de Lisboa (BS)
- Occupations: Singer; songwriter; multi-instrumentalist
- Years active: 2017–present
- Musical career
- Origin: Lisbon, Portugal
- Genres: Jazz; Standards; Pop; Indian classical music
- Label: Soundcrest Music Group
- Website: sofiahoffmann.com

Sofia Hoffmann de Mendonça (born January 16, 1980), known professionally as Sofia Hoffmann, is a Portuguese-German singer, songwriter, and multi-instrumentalist. She released her first album One Soul in 2019 with the support of Smooth FM.

== Early life and career ==
=== Early life ===
Sofia Hoffmann was born on January 16, 1980, in Lisbon, Portugal. She is of Portuguese and German descent. During high school in Estoril, she used to perform locally in bands with friends and classmates. During this time, she studied classical guitar from Professor Walter Lopes, and took voice lessons from Maria do Rosário Coelho (who passed in 2011). She attributes her studying classical guitar for four years before studying voice to helping her in writing, and composing songs.

Continuing with her education, Hoffmann then studied and graduated from the Universidade de Lisboa, having earned a Bachelor's of Science degree in Marine Biology.

=== Career ===
After graduating university, Sofia Hoffmann briefly worked in the micro aquaculture and microalgae industry before making a transition to the METRO/Makro group. It is while working for METRO/Makro that she moved to Milan, Italy. While living in Milan, she was introduced to, and studied, voice under Italian jazz singer Laura Fedele.

After three years in Milan, Hoffmann would make another move with METRO/Makro to Madrid, Spain for a year before returning to the microalgae industry, and a return to her home in Lisbon in 2011. After returning to Lisbon, she continued her vocal lessons with Portuguese jazz singer Maria João

In 2014, Hoffmann would meet Roop Verma a disciple of Ravi Shankar and Ali Akbar Khan plus master in Nada Yoga. She would take sitar lessons from Verma until his passing in 2017, before studying under another of Shankar's disciples, Gaurav Mazumdar.

During this time she was performing on stages, one of them the infamous Cinema São Jorge in Lisbon. It was then that she realized she had the potential for music on a grander scale. She then recorded her first album, One Soul, and released it on. 31 May 2019. With the support of Smooth FM, she sold out her concert in Lisbon at Teatro São Luiz.

Following the buzz she created with her first album, Hoffmann started writing her second album during the pandemic with the song "Esperarei". It was during this time that she started working with John Beasley, Rui Veloso, and Gaurav Mazumdar on the record that would become Rebirth.

== Discography ==
Studio albums

- One Soul (2019)
- Rebirth (2022)
