= Sarah Vaughan singles discography =

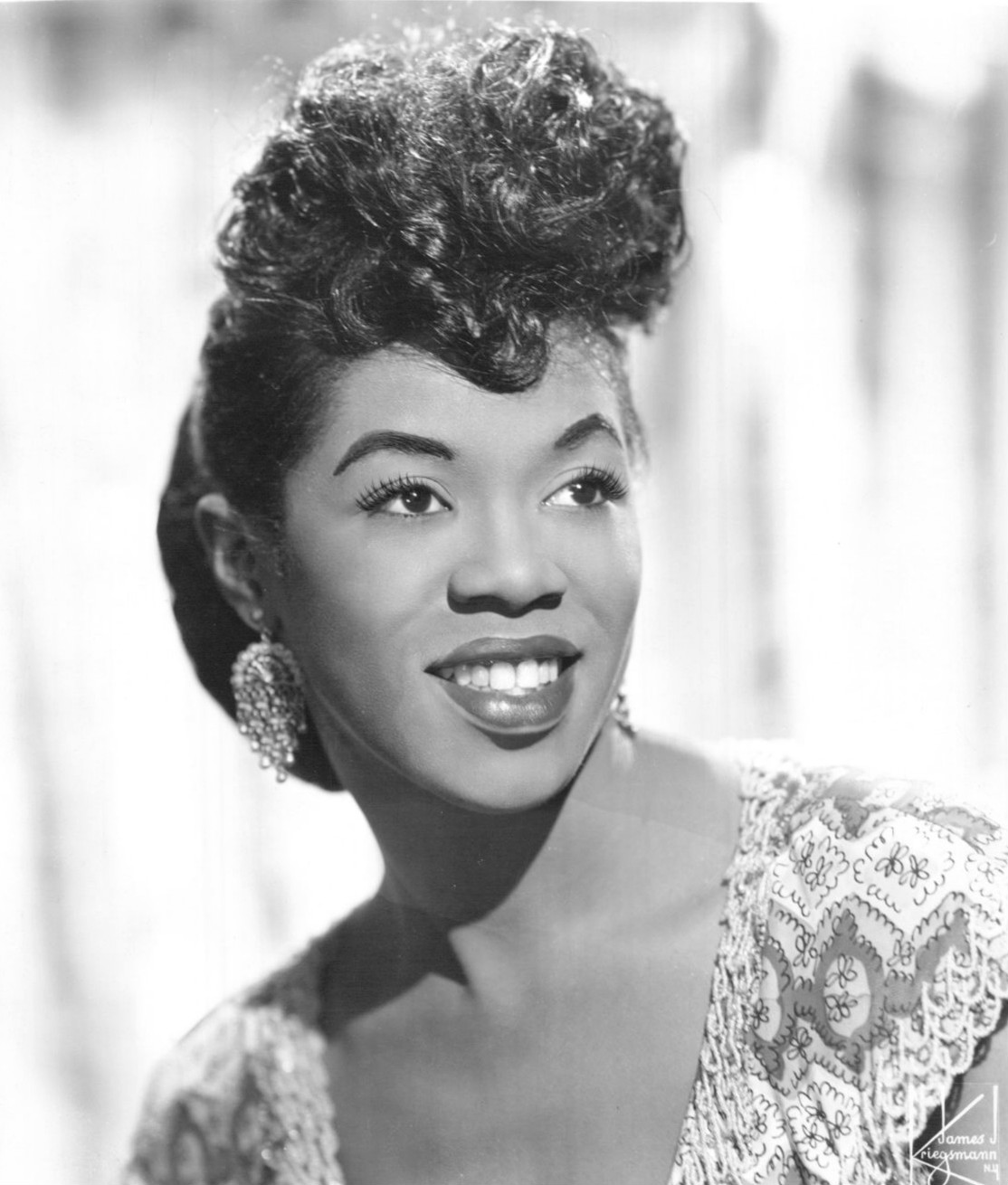
- Sarah Vaughan, 1955
- Singles: 89
- Promotional singles: 2
- Other charted songs: 7

The singles discography of American Jazz artist Sarah Vaughan contains 89 singles, two promotional singles and seven other charted songs. Vaughan recorded her first singles in 1946, with her first release being "If You Could See Me Now". Soon after, she saw her first major chart success on the Billboard pop list with "Tenderly" and "It's Magic." Moving to Columbia Records, she had further pop hits in the late 1940s with covers of "Black Coffee" and "Nature Boy." She had her second top ten hit in 1950 with "(I Love the Girl) I Love the Guy." Vaughan moved to Mercury Records during the 1950s and recorded more pop music. At Mercury, she had her biggest chart success, with the top ten hits "Make Yourself Comfortable" and "Whatever Lola Wants." In 1959, Vaughan's single "Broken Hearted Melody" reached number seven on the Billboard pop chart and became an international success, becoming the biggest single of her career.

Vaughan had further pop chart entries into the 1960s with "Eternally" and "Serenata." She then moved to Roulette Records. At Roulette, she recorded a handful of singles, including "Bluesette," which was her first to chart on the Billboard adult contemporary survey. She followed this with "A Lover's Concerto," which reached the top ten of the same chart. The song also was her final release to chart on the pop chart, reaching the top 70. Vaughan continued releasing singles through various record labels into the 1980s. Her 1974 release, "I Need You More (Than Ever Now)" was her final charting release.

== Singles ==
=== 1940s ===
List of singles, with selected chart positions, showing relevant details
Title	Year	Peak chart positions	Album
Title	Year	US	Album
"If You Could See Me Now"	1946	—	—N/a
"Mean to Me"	1946	—	—N/a
"A Hundred Years from Today"	1947	—	—N/a
"I Cover the Waterfront"	1947	—	—N/a
"Tenderly"	1947	27	The Divine Sarah Sings
"It's Magic"	1948	11	The Divine Sarah Sings
"Nature Boy"	1948	9	—N/a
"Black Coffee"	1949	13	—N/a
"While You Are Gone"	1949	—	—N/a
"That Lucky Old Sun (Just Rolls Around Heaven All Day)"	1949	14	—N/a
"Fool's Paradise"	1949	—	—N/a
"—" denotes a recording that did not chart or was not released in that territory.

=== 1950s ===
List of singles, with selected chart positions, showing relevant details
Title	Year	Peak chart positions						Album
Title	Year	US	US R&B	AUS	CAN	ND	UK	Album
"I'm Crazy to Love You"	1950	26	—	—	—	—	—	—N/a
"Our Very Own"	1950	15	—	—	—	—	—	—N/a
"(I Love the Girl) I Love the Guy" (c/w "Thinking of You")	1950	10	—	—	—	—	—	—N/a
"Don't Worry 'bout Me"	1950	—	—	—	—	—	—	—N/a
"These Things I Offer You (for a Lifetime)"	1951	11	—	—	—	—	—	—N/a
"Vanity"	1951	19	—	—	—	—	—	—N/a
"Out o' Breath"	1951	—	—	—	—	—	—	—N/a
"Don't Blame Me"	1951	—	—	—	—	—	—	—N/a
"I Ran All the Way Home"	1951	18	—	—	—	—	—	—N/a
"Pinky"	1952	—	—	—	—	—	—	Sarah Vaughan in Hi-Fi
"If Someone Had Told Me"	1952	—	—	—	—	—	—	—N/a
"Street of Dreams"	1952	—	—	—	—	—	—	—N/a
"My Tormented Heart"	1952	—	—	—	—	—	—	—N/a
"Sinner or Saint"	1952	22	—	—	—	—	—	—N/a
"I Confess"	1953	—	8	—	—	—	—	—N/a
"Time"	1953	—	—	—	—	—	—	—N/a
"Spring Will Be a Little Late This Year"	1953	—	—	—	—	—	—	Sarah Vaughan in Hi-Fi
"It Might as Well Be Spring"	1953	—	—	—	—	—	—	Sarah Vaughan in Hi-Fi
"The Nearness of You"	1954	—	—	—	—	—	—	Sarah Vaughan in Hi-Fi
"Easy Come, Easy Go Lover"	1954	—	—	—	—	—	—	—N/a
"Come Along with Me"	1954	—	—	—	—	—	—	—N/a
"Old Devil Moon"	1954	—	—	—	—	—	—	—N/a
"Make Yourself Comfortable"	1954	6	—	4	—	—	—	Sarah Vaughan's Golden Hits
"How Important Can It Be"	1955	12	—	5	—	—	—	Sarah Vaughan's Golden Hits
"Whatever Lola Wants"	1955	6	—	—	—	—	—	Sarah Vaughan's Golden Hits
"Experience Unnecessary"	1955	14	—	—	—	—	—	—N/a
"Johnny Be Smart"	1955	—	—	—	—	—	—	—N/a
"C'est la vie"	1955	11	—	—	—	—	—	—N/a
"Mr. Wonderful"	1955	13	—	10	—	—	—	—N/a
"Hot and Cold Running Tears"	1956	92	—	—	—	—	—	—N/a
"Fabulous Character"	1956	19	—	—	—	—	—	Sarah Vaughan in A Romantic Mood
"It Happened Again"	1956	72	—	—	—	—	—	Sarah Vaughan in A Romantic Mood
"The Banana Boat Song"	1956	19	—	—	—	—	—	Sarah Vaughan's Golden Hits
"Leave It to Love"	1957	91	—	—	—	—	—	—N/a
"Passing Strangers" (with Billy Eckstine)	1957	82	—	—	27	—	22	—N/a
"Band of Angels" (with Billy Eckstine)	1957	—	—	—	—	—	—	—N/a
"Gone Again"	1957	—	—	—	—	—	—	—N/a
"Padre"	1958	—	—	—	—	—	—	—N/a
"What's So Bad About It"	1958	—	—	—	—	—	—	—N/a
"Everything I Do"	1958	—	—	—	—	—	—	—N/a
"Separate Ways"	1959	96	—	—	—	—	—	—N/a
"Broken Hearted Melody"	1959	7	8	5	3	19	7	Sarah Vaughan's Golden Hits
"Smooth Operator"	1959	44	8	45	23	—	—	Sarah Vaughan's Golden Hits
"—" denotes a recording that did not chart or was not released in that territory.

=== 1960s ===
List of singles, with selected chart positions, showing relevant details
Title	Year	Peak chart positions				Album
Title	Year	US	US AC	AUS	UK	Album
"Eternally"	1960	41	—	76	—	Sarah Vaughan's Golden Hits
"Our Waltz"	1960	— (Note: "Our Waltz" peaked at number three on the Billboard Bubbling Under Hot 100 singles chart, a list which acts as a 25-song extension of the Hot 100.)	—	—	—	—N/a
"Doodlin'"	1960	—	—	—	—	—N/a
"Ooh! What a Day"	1960	— (Note: "Ooh! What a Day" peaked at number 11 on the Billboard Bubbling Under Hot 100 singles chart, a list which acts as a 25-song extension of the Hot 100.)	—	—	—	—N/a
"If I Were a Bell"	1960	—	—	—	—	Count Basie/Sarah Vaughan
"Serenata"	1960	82	—	32	37	—N/a
"Mary Contrary"	1960	—	—	—	—	—N/a
"Love Me"	1961	—	—	—	—	—N/a
"(All of a Sudden) My Heart Sings"	1961	—	—	—	—	My Heart Sings
"What's the Use"	1961	—	—	—	—	—N/a
"Gone with the Wind"	1961	—	—	—	—	—N/a
"You're Mine, You"	1961	—	—	—	—	You're Mine You
"One Mint Julep"	1962	—	—	—	—	You're Mine You
"Moonglow"	1962	—	—	—	—	—N/a
"Call Me Irresponsible"	1963	—	—	—	—	—N/a
"Bluesette"	1963	— (Note: "Bluesette" peaked at number 31 on the Billboard Bubbling Under Hot 100 singles chart, a list which acts as a 25-song extension of the Hot 100.)	33	—	—	—N/a
"Once Upon a Summertime"	1963	—	—	—	—	—N/a
"I Believe in You"	1963	—	—	—	—	The Explosive Side of Sarah Vaughan
"Boy from Ipanema"	1963	—	—	—	—	¡Viva! Vaughan
"Sole, Sole, Sole"	1964	—	—	—	—	—N/a
"Mr. Lucky"	1964	—	—	—	—	¡Viva! Vaughan
"A Taste of Honey"	1965	—	—	—	—	Sarah Sings Soulfully
"The Pawnbroker"	1965	—	—	—	—	—N/a
"The Good Life"	1965	—	—	—	—	—N/a
"A Lover's Concerto"	1966	63	5	—	—	Pop Artistry of Sarah Vaughan
"1-2-3"	1966	—	33	—	—	The New Scene
"The Time for Love Is Anytime"	1969	—	—	—	—	—N/a
"—" denotes a recording that did not chart or was not released in that territory.

=== 1970s and 1980s ===
List of singles, with selected chart positions, showing relevant details
Title	Year	Peak chart positions	Album
Title	Year	US R&B	Album
"Sweet Gingerbread Man"	1971	—	A Time in My Life
"Inner City Blues (Make Me Wanna Holler)"	1972	—	A Time in My Life
"The Story of Frasier (The Sensuous Lion)"	1972	—	Send in the Clowns
"Pieces of Dreams"	1972	—	Sarah Vaughan with Michel Legrand
"Alone Again"	1972	—	Feelin' Good
"Send in the Clowns"	1973	—	Send in the Clowns
"I Need You More (Than Ever Now)"	1974	80	Send in the Clowns
"The Fool on the Hill"	1981	—	Songs of the Beatles
"Love and Passion"	1987	—	Brazilian Romance
"—" denotes a recording that did not chart or was not released in that territory.

== Promotional singles ==
List of promotional singles, showing relevant details
Title	Year	Notes
"The Other Half of Me"	1965	(Note: Released by Mercury in 1965. It was issued as a 7" single on the label. The B-side to the single was entitled "We Almost Made It".)
"I'll Never Be Lonely Again"	1966	(Note: Released by Mercury in 1965. The song was issued in both 7" and a 45 RPM versions. The B-side to the single was entitled "Darling".)

== Other charted songs ==
List of songs, with selected chart positions, showing notes and other relevant details
Title	Year	Peak chart positions			Album	Notes
Title	Year	US	AUS	UK	Album	Notes
"Make Believe (You Are Glad When You're Sorry)"	1949	20	—	—	—N/a	(Note: Released in August 1949 as the B-side to "That Lucky Old Sun (Just Rolls Around Heaven All Day)". It was issued by Columbia as a 78 RPM. The song did not initially appear on an album.)
"Thinking of You"	1950	16	—	—	—N/a	(Note: Released in August 1950 as the B-side to "I Love the Girl (I Love the Guy)". It was issued by Columbia as a 78. The song did not initially appear on an album.)
"The Other Woman"	1956	86	—	—	—N/a	(Note: Released in June 1956 as the B-side to "Fabulous Character". It was issued by Mercury as a 7" single. The song did not initially appear on an album.)
"That's Not the Kind of Love I Want"	1956	—	37	—	—N/a	(Note: Released in 1956 as the B-side to "Hot and Cold Runnin' Tears". It was issued by Mercury Records as a 7" single.)
"Misty"	1959	— (Note: "Misty" peaked at number six on the Billboard Bubbling Under Hot 100 singles chart, a list which acts as a 25-song extension of the Hot 100.)	—	—	Vaughan and Violins	(Note: Released in 1959 as the B-side to "Broken Hearted Melody". It was issued by Mercury as a 45 single. The song appeared on the 1959 studio album Vaughan and Violins.)
"You're My Baby"	1960	87	—	—	—N/a	(Note: Released in 1959 as the B-side to "Smooth Operator". It was issued by Mercury as a 45.)
"Let's"	1961	—	—	37	—N/a	(Note: Released in 1960 as the B-side to "Serenata". It was issued by Columbia as a 7" single. The song did not initially appear on an album.)
"—" denotes a recording that did not chart or was not released in that territory.
