= Our Very Own =

Our Very Own may refer to

- Our Very Own (1950 film)
  - "Our Very Own" (song), a song from the above film
- Our Very Own (2005 film)
