= Drifting and Dreaming with Jo Stafford =

Compilation album by Jo Stafford
- Released: July 9, 1996
- Genre: Traditional pop
- Label: Jazz Classics

Professional ratings
Review scores
Source	Rating
Allmusic	4/5 stars

Drifting and Dreaming with Jo Stafford is a 1996 compilation album of songs recorded by American singer Jo Stafford. It was released on July 9, 1996, on the Jazz Classics label.

This album was taken from AFRS radio transcripts. Originally known as The Carnation Contented Hour, and co-hosted by Stafford and Dick Haymes on CBS Radio, the show was renamed as The Melody Hour and its commercial content edited out for re-broadcast to the Armed Forces.

== Track listing ==
1. "Dream a Little Dream of Me"
2. "Those Old Piano Roll Blues"
3. "I Wanna Be Loved"
4. "Them There Eyes"
5. "That Old Black Magic"
6. "A Little Bit Independent"
7. "No Other Love"
8. "Play a Simple Melody"
9. "I Got the Sun in the Morning"
10. "I Still Get a Thrill"
11. "I Didn't Slip, I Wasn't Pushed, I Fell"
12. "Row, Row, Row"
13. "Louise"
14. "Driftin' Down the Dreamy Ol' Ohio"
15. "Bewitched, Bothered and Bewildered"
16. "Begin the Beguine"
17. "I Love the Guy"
18. "Casey Jones"
19. "Darn It, Baby, That's Love"
20. "I Cried for You"
21. "I've Got You Under My Skin"
22. "Three Little Words"
23. "I Didn't Know What Time It Was"
24. "We'll Build a Bungalow (Underneath the Bamboo Tree)"
25. "Mississippi"
26. "Sunshine Cake"
27. "Ending Theme and Sign Off"
