= Sarah + 2 =

Studio album by Sarah Vaughan
- Released: 1962
- Recorded: August 7–8, 1962
- Genre: Vocal jazz
- Length: 46:08
- Label: Roulette
- Producer: Voyle Gilmore

Sarah Vaughan chronology
| You're Mine You (1962) | Sarah + 2 (1962) | Sarah Sings Soulfully (1963) |

Sarah + 2 is a 1962 studio album by American jazz singer Sarah Vaughan.

This was Vaughan's second album with just guitar and double bass accompaniment, following 1961's After Hours.

== Reception ==
Professional ratings
Review scores
| Source | Rating |
|---|---|
| Allmusic | 3.5/5 stars |

The Allmusic review by John Bush awarded the album three and a half stars and said that "The results are excellent, highlighting the power of Vaughan's voice, whether she's singing a rosy "All I Do Is Dream of You" or one of the most turgid torch songs, "All or Nothing at All." Her best feature is "When Sunny Gets Blue," a spotlight for her dynamic range.".

== Track listing ==
1. "Just in Time" (Betty Comden, Adolph Green, Jule Styne) - 2:17
2. "When Sunny Gets Blue" (Jack Segal, Marvin Fisher) - 3:48
3. "All I Do Is Dream of You" (Nacio Herb Brown, Arthur Freed) - 2:54
4. "I Understand" (Kim Gannon, Mabel Wayne) - 4:25
5. "Goodnight Sweetheart" (Ray Noble, Jimmy Campbell, Reg Connelly) - 3:32
6. "Baby, Won't You Please Come Home" (Charles Warfield, Clarence Williams) - 2:34
7. "When Lights Are Low" (Benny Carter, Spencer Williams) - 2:55
8. "Key Largo" (Carter, Karl Suessdorf, Leah Worth) - 3:26
9. "Just Squeeze Me (But Please Don't Tease Me)" (Duke Ellington, Lee Gaines) - 3:10
10. "All or Nothing at All" (Arthur Altman, Jack Lawrence) - 3:12
11. "The Very Thought of You" (Noble) - 4:10

== Personnel ==
- Sarah Vaughan – vocal
- Barney Kessel – guitar
- Joe Comfort – double bass
