= Sarah Vaughan with the Jimmy Rowles Quintet =

Sarah Vaughan and the Jimmy Rowles Quintet

Live album by Sarah Vaughan
- Released: June 1975
- Recorded: 1974
- Genre: Vocal jazz
- Length: 54:43
- Label: Mainstream

Sarah Vaughan chronology
Send in the Clowns (1974)	Sarah Vaughan and the Jimmy Rowles Quintet (1975)	I Love Brazil! (1977)

Sarah Vaughan and the Jimmy Rowles Quintet is a 1974 live album by Sarah Vaughan, accompanied by pianist Jimmy Rowles and his quintet.

The song "Morning Star" was mistakenly attributed in the liner notes of the album to W. C. Handy, but was actually written by Rowles and lyricist Johnny Mercer.

== Reception ==
Professional ratings
Review scores
Source	Rating
AllMusic	4/5 stars

The AllMusic review by Ken Dryden stated that Rowles proves himself to be "a consummate accompanist," and Vaughan is "in her usual outstanding form."

== Track listing ==
1. "The Folks Who Live On the Hill" (Oscar Hammerstein II, Jerome Kern) - 4:50
2. "That Face" (Alan Bergman, Lew Spence) - 7:55
3. "That Sunday, That Summer" (Joe Sherman, George David Weiss) - 4:33
4. "A House Is Not a Home" (Burt Bacharach, Hal David) - 5:10
5. "Frasier (The Sensuous Lion)" (Jimmy Rowles, Johnny Mercer) - 4:20
6. "Morning Star" (Rowles, Mercer) - 6:43

== Personnel ==
- Sarah Vaughan - vocals
- Jimmy Rowles - piano
- Al Aarons - trumpet
- Teddy Edwards - tenor saxophone
- Monty Budwig - double bass
- Donald Bailey - drums
