= Now It Can Be Told =

"Now It Can Be Told" is a popular song written by Irving Berlin for the 1938 film Alexander's Ragtime Band, where it was introduced by Alice Faye and Don Ameche. It was nominated for an Academy Award in 1938 but lost to "Thanks for the Memory".

== Notable recordings ==
External audio
- You may hear '"Now It Can Be Told" performed by Shep Fields and his Rippling Rhythm Orchestra with John Serry in 1938 Here on Archive.org

- Mildred Bailey (1938)
- Teddy Wilson with Nan Wynn (1938)
- Shep Fields collaborated with John Serry Sr. to record this song for Bluebird Records in 1938.
- Bing Crosby - recorded May 23, 1938 with John Scott Trotter and his Orchestra. This reached No. 7 in the charts of the day.
- Tommy Dorsey - the most popular recording of the song in 1938, vocal by Jack Leonard. This reached the No. 2 spot in the charts of the day.
- Tony Martin - another chart success in 1938, peaking at No. 13.
- Vera Lynn (1940)
- Billy Eckstine and Sarah Vaughan - included in their album Sarah Vaughan and Billy Eckstine Sing the Best of Irving Berlin (1957)
- Ella Fitzgerald - Ella Fitzgerald Sings the Irving Berlin Songbook (1958)
- Tony Bennett - Bennett/Berlin (1987)
