= Swingin' Easy =

Studio album by Sarah Vaughan
- Released: 1957
- Recorded: April 2, 1954, February 14, 1957
- Genre: Vocal jazz
- Length: 35:26
- Label: EmArcy 36109
- Producer: Jack Tracy

Sarah Vaughan chronology
Sassy (1956)	Swingin' Easy (1957)	Sarah Vaughan in a Romantic Mood (1957)

Professional ratings
Review scores
Source	Rating
AllMusic	4.5/5 stars
The Penguin Guide to Jazz Recordings	4/4 stars

Swingin' Easy is a 1957 studio album by the American jazz singer Sarah Vaughan.

On the second chorus of "All of Me" Vaughan bops in "a quite extraordinary fashion, covering more than two octaves" (from the sleeve notes). "Pennies from Heaven" is taken slower than is usual and Vaughan creates a brand new melody the second time around, a kind of descant improvising on the original tune.

Eight of the tracks, recorded on April 2, 1954, with John Malachi on piano and Joe Benjamin on bass, were originally released that year on a 10-inch LP entitled Images.

== Critical reception ==
The initial Billboard review from November 1957 said the album was a "commentary on Miss Vaughan's high level of professionalism and ease in jazz environment. Relaxed quality is keynote here as the singer makes the difficult sound easy." The Billboard review highlighted "Words Can't Describe", which noted that it was given an "especially cogent reading". Mentioning “Shulie a Bop”, “Lover Man”, and “Linger Awhile” as particular highlights, The Penguin Guide to Jazz Recordings says that, backed by only a rhythm section, “Vaughan is at her freest and most good-humoured.”

== Track listing ==
1. "Shulie a Bop" (George Treadwell, Sarah Vaughan) – 2:42
2. "Lover Man (Oh, Where Can You Be?)" (Jimmy Davis, Ram Ramirez, Jimmy Sherman) – 3:19
3. "I Cried for You" (Gus Arnheim, Arthur Freed, Abe Lyman) – 1:42
4. "Polka Dots and Moonbeams" (Johnny Burke, Jimmy Van Heusen) – 2:36
5. "All of Me" (Gerald Marks, Seymour Simons) – 3:18
6. "Words Can't Describe" (Bill Tennyson) – 4:35
7. "Prelude to a Kiss" (Duke Ellington, Irving Gordon, Irving Mills) – 2:48
8. "You Hit the Spot" (Mack Gordon, Harry Revel) – 3:03
9. "Pennies from Heaven" (Johnny Burke, Arthur Johnston) – 3:07
10. "If I Knew Then (What I Know Now)" (Eddie Howard, Dick Jurgens) – 2:33
11. "Body and Soul" (Frank Eyton, Johnny Green, Edward Heyman, Robert Sour) – 3:15
12. "They Can't Take That Away from Me" (George Gershwin, Ira Gershwin) – 2:44
13. "Linger Awhile" (Harry Owens, Vincent Rose) – 1:00 (Bonus track not on the original LP.)

== Personnel ==
Recorded April, 1954 and February, 1957, in New York City, United States:

- Sarah Vaughan – vocals
- Jimmy Jones – piano, tracks 3, 5, 6, 9, and 13
- John Malachi – piano, tracks 1, 2, 4, 7, 8, 10, 11, and 12
- Richard Davis – double bass, tracks 3, 5, 6, 9, and 13
- Joe Benjamin – double bass, tracks 1, 2, 4, 7, 8, 10, 11, and 12
- Roy Haynes – drums
