= Sassy Swings Again =

Studio album by Sarah Vaughan
- Released: 1967
- Recorded: January 23–24, 1967
- Genre: Vocal jazz
- Length: 31:05
- Label: Mercury
- Producer: Hal Mooney

Sarah Vaughan chronology
It's a Man's World (1967)	Sassy Swings Again (1967)	A Time in My Life (1971)

Sassy Swings Again is a 1967 studio album by Sarah Vaughan. This was Vaughan's last album for Mercury Records, and her last studio recording for four years.

== Reception ==
Professional ratings
Review scores
Source	Rating
Allmusic	4/5 stars

The Allmusic review by Stephen Cook awarded the album four stars and said that Vaughan was in her "autumnal prime" and the album was "an often overlooked but essential session from that most divine of jazz chanteuses".

== Track listing ==
1. "Sweet Georgia Brown" (Ben Bernie, Maceo Pinkard, Kenneth Casey) - 1:50
2. "Take the "A" Train" (Billy Strayhorn) - 2:39
3. "I Left My Heart in San Francisco" (George Cory, Douglass Cross) - 4:06
4. "S'posin'" (Paul Denniker, Andy Razaf) - 3:08
5. "Every Day I Have the Blues" (Memphis Slim) - 4:22
6. "I Want to Be Happy" (Irving Caesar, Vincent Youmans) - 2:19
7. "All Alone" (Irving Berlin) - 2:19
8. "The Sweetest Sounds" (Richard Rodgers) - 4:30
9. "On the Other Side of the Tracks" (Cy Coleman, Carolyn Leigh) - 3:35
10. "I Had a Ball" (Jack Lawrence, Stan Freeman) - 2:17

== Personnel ==
- Sarah Vaughan - vocals
- Manny Albam - arranger
- Thad Jones - arranger
- Bob James - arranger, piano
- J.J. Johnson - arranger, trombone
- Malcolm Little - liner notes
- Phil Woods - Reeds (Multiple), alto saxophone
- Benny Golson - Reeds (Multiple), saxophone
- Kai Winding - trombone
- Freddie Hubbard - trumpet
- Joe Newman
- Charlie Shavers
- Clark Terry
