= All of My Life (Irving Berlin song) =

Single by Bing Crosby
- B-side: "A Friend of Yours"
- Released: 1945
- Genre: Pop
- Length: 3:13
- Label: Decca
- Songwriter: Irving Berlin

"All of My Life" is a 1944 song composed by Irving Berlin. It was first recorded in 1945 by Bing Crosby whose version reached No. 12 in the Billboard charts. Other chart hits in 1945 were by Sammy Kaye and his Orchestra (vocal by Billy Williams) and by The Three Suns.

== Other recordings ==
- Sarah Vaughan and Billy Eckstine recorded it for their album Sarah Vaughan and Billy Eckstine Sing the Best of Irving Berlin (1957).
- Tony Bennett included it on his album Bennett/Berlin (1987)

== Popular culture ==
- The song can be heard on the soundtrack of the 1972 film The Godfather.

== See also ==
- List of jazz standards
