= Sarah Vaughan and Billy Eckstine Sing the Best of Irving Berlin =

Studio album by Billy Eckstine Sarah Vaughan
- Released: 1957
- Genre: Vocal jazz Traditional pop
- Label: Mercury

Sarah Vaughan chronology
Sarah Vaughan in a Romantic Mood (1957)	Sarah Vaughan and Billy Eckstine Sing the Best of Irving Berlin (1957)	Sarah Vaughan Sings George Gershwin (1958)

Billy Eckstine chronology
That Old Feeling (1956)	Sarah Vaughan and Billy Eckstine Sing the Best of Irving Berlin (1957)	Billy's Best! (1958)

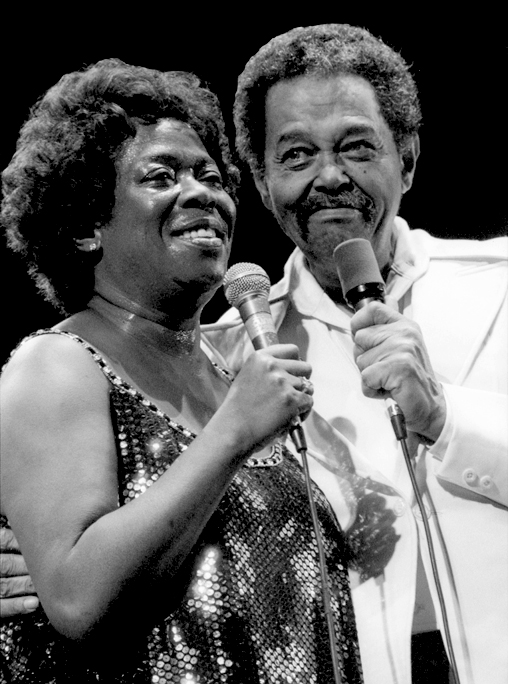
Sarah Vaughan & Billy Eckstine at Monterey Jazz Festival 1981

Sarah Vaughan and Billy Eckstine Sing the Best of Irving Berlin is a 1957 studio album featuring Billy Eckstine and Sarah Vaughan, and the songs of Irving Berlin.

Although Vaughan had made many recordings with Eckstine, this was their only complete album together.

== Reception ==
Professional ratings
Review scores
Source	Rating
Allmusic	4/5 stars

The Allmusic review by Stephen Cook awarded the album four stars and said that "Sometimes surpassing their splendid solo sides, Vaughan and Eckstine obviously revel in each other's company here, seamlessly blending their voices on most every track...A highlight from the land of vintage vocal jazz.".

== Track listing ==
1. "Alexander's Ragtime Band" – 4:02
2. "Isn't This a Lovely Day?" – 3:53
3. "I've Got My Love to Keep Me Warm" – 4:14
4. "All of My Life" – 3:16
5. "Cheek to Cheek" – 2:46
6. "You're Just in Love" – 3:42
7. "Remember" – 2:19
8. "Always" – 2:37
9. "Easter Parade" – 3:14
10. "The Girl That I Marry" – 2:59
11. "Now It Can Be Told" – 3:43

All songs written by Irving Berlin.

== Personnel ==
- Sarah Vaughan – vocals
- Billy Eckstine – vocals and solo on All of My Life and The Girl That I Marry
- Hal Mooney – arranger, conductor
