= Sarah Vaughan in a Romantic Mood =

Studio album by Sarah Vaughan
- Released: 1957
- Label: Mercury

Sarah Vaughan chronology
Swingin' Easy (1957)	Sarah Vaughan in a Romantic Mood (1957)	Sarah Vaughan and Billy Eckstine Sing the Best of Irving Berlin (1957)

Professional ratings
Review scores
Source	Rating
AllMusic	3/5 stars
Billboard	4/4 stars

Sarah Vaughan in a Romantic Mood is a studio album by Sarah Vaughan released in 1957 on Mercury Records.

== Track listing ==
12-inch LP (Mercury – MG 20223)

Side A
No.	Title	Length
1.	"It Happened Again"	2:26
2.	"You Ought to Have a Wife"	2:25
3.	"Slowly with Feeling"	2:43
4.	"Exactly like You"	2:20
5.	"How Important Can It Be"	2:27
6.	"Fabulous Character"	2:39

Side B
No.	Title	Length
1.	""C'est la vie""	2:30
2.	"Never"	2:25
3.	"The Edge of the Sea"	2:41
4.	"Waltzing down the Aisle"	2:13
5.	"Don't Let Me Love You"	2:17
6.	"The Second Time"	2:45
