= If I Knew Then (Dick Jurgens and Eddy Howard song) =

Sheet music of "If I Knew Then"

"If I Knew Then" is a 1939 song written by Dick Jurgens and Eddy Howard, and performed by Jurgens' big band with Howard singing. Their version charted briefly in 1939.

== Other versions ==
Bing Crosby recorded the song on February 9, 1940 with John Scott Trotter and His Orchestra. It was also covered by Johnny Mercer and his Pied Pipers (1945), Sammy Kaye and his Orchestra, Sarah Vaughan on Sarah Vaughan with Clifford Brown and Swingin' Easy, Val Doonican (1968) and many others. Ray Conniff's version "bubbled under" the Hot 100, reaching No. 26.
