= Experience Unnecessary =

Single by Sarah Vaughan
- B-side: "Slowly with Feeling"
- Released: 1955
- Label: Mercury
- Songwriters: Gladys Shelley, Jerry Whitman, Hugo Peretti, Luigi Creatore

Audio
- "Experience Unnecessary" on YouTube

Professional ratings
Review scores
Source	Rating
Billboard	positive ("Spotlight" pick)

"Experience Unnecessary" is a song that was a hit in 1955 as recorded by Sarah Vaughan with Hugo Peretti and his orchestra for Mercury Records.

== Composition ==
Vaughan's version is credited to Gladys Shelley, Jerry Whitman, Hugo Peretti and Luigi Creatore.

== Critical reception ==
Billboard reviewed Sarah Vaughan's recording (Mercury 70646, coupled with "Slowly with Feeling") in its issue from 11 June 1955, praising the "pleasant melody", the "clever lyrics" and the "rich" and "sultry" vocals "in the best Vaughan tradition". "The canary has a way with a sexy lyric, as witness her recent click disks, and this new side packs the same emotional appeal," wrote the reviewer.

== Commercial performance ==
On 9 July 1955, the Billboard magazine featured Sarah Vaughan's single in its "This Week's Best Buys" column, noting that "while this [had] not been one of [her] faster moving disks", it was "beginning to show a fine spread of good sales reports" and was "shaping as a record with chart potential."

In the issue from 16 July, the single charted on Billboard's Most Played by Jockeys chart at number 14. Moreover, on 16 and 23 July, the single appeared on the Coming Up Strong chart at numbers 10 and 9, respectively.

== Charts ==
Chart (1955)	Peak position
US Billboard Most Played by Jockeys	14

== Other versions ==
The song was covered by Phyllis Branch, whose version was reviewed in the Billboard issue dated 30 July 1955. The reviewer noted Branch's "distinctive reading of the ballad" and described the version as an interesting listen, but concluded that it was "not likely to create much of a commercial fuss" or "to overtake the Sarah Vaughan entry".
