= After Hours (1961 Sarah Vaughan album) =

Studio album by Sarah Vaughan
- Released: September 1, 1961
- Recorded: July 18, 1961
- Studio: RKO-Pathe, New York City
- Genre: Vocal jazz
- Length: 35:22
- Label: Roulette
- Producer: Michael Cuscuna, Teddy Reig

Sarah Vaughan chronology
Count Basie/Sarah Vaughan (1961)	After Hours (1961)	You're Mine You (1961)

After Hours is a 1961 studio album by American jazz singer Sarah Vaughan.

This was Vaughan's first album with just guitar and double bass accompaniment; it was followed by 1963's Sarah + 2 in a similar vein.

== Reception ==
Professional ratings
Review scores
Source	Rating
AllMusic	3/5 stars
The Rolling Stone Jazz Record Guide	3/5 stars
The Penguin Guide to Jazz Recordings	4/4 stars

The AllMusic review by Scott Yanow awarded After Hours three stars and said that "the emphasis throughout is exclusively on Sassy's magnificent voice. The program mostly sticks to ballads, with a couple of exceptions...and is a quiet and intimate affair, with Vaughan more subtle than she sometimes was. Despite a lightweight version of 'My Favorite Things' that will not remind listeners of John Coltrane, this is an excellent if brief set (34-and-a-half minutes) with some fine jazz singing". Awarding it a maximum four-star rating, The Penguin Guide to Jazz Recordings says that the album, while relatively obscure, is one of Vaughan's best records.

== Track listing ==
1. "My Favorite Things" (Richard Rodgers, Oscar Hammerstein II) – 2:46
2. "Ev'ry Time We Say Goodbye" (Cole Porter) – 2:26
3. "Wonder Why" (Nicholas Brodszky, Sammy Cahn) – 4:21
4. "You'd Be So Easy to Love" (Porter) – 2:12
5. "Sophisticated Lady" (Duke Ellington, Irving Mills, Mitchell Parish) – 3:52
6. "Great Day" (Edward Eliscu, Billy Rose, Vincent Youmans) – 2:18
7. "Ill Wind" (Harold Arlen, Ted Koehler) – 3:13
8. "If Love Is Good to Me" (Redd Evans, Fred Spielman) – 2:12
9. "In a Sentimental Mood" (Ellington, Manny Kurtz, Mills) – 4:06
10. "Vanity" (Bernard Bierman, Jack Manus, Guy Wood) – 4:19
11. "Through the Years" (Edward Heyman, Youmans) – 3:09

== Personnel ==
- Sarah Vaughan – vocal
- Mundell Lowe – guitar
- George Duvivier – double bass
