= Phyllis Branch =

- Born: 1920
- Occupation: Singer
- Musical career
- Genres: Jazz; calypso
- Instrument: Vocals

Phyllis Branch was an American jazz and calypso singer.

== Early life and education ==
Phyllis Branch was born in 1920. She lived in Brooklyn, where she studied at a trade school while taking private vocal lessons. In 1943, she enlisted in the U.S. Army. In 1945, she was discharged.

== Musical career ==
After having been discharged from the army in 1945, she chose the career of a professional singer.

In early October 1948, she was noted in Billboard's review of the Savannah Club, New York, as having a "throaty voice" which was, however, "too vibrato" for her "Babalu" song and a week later was reported to have signed an "exclusive three-year contract" with National Records.

Around 1952, she signed up with a newly-formed Tuxedo record label. Later in the decade, Billboard reviewed some of her single records, judging her performances as "capable", "acceptable" (Tuxedo 882, "Smoke Gets in Your Eyes" / "Think of Me in Your Spare Time"), "distinctive", "interesting", "mature" (Tuxedo 905, "Experience Unnecessary" / "Do You Remember"). In 1957, the magazine praised her recording of "Calypso Fever" (Tuxedo 919, c/w "Babalu") for its "wild gimmicked quality", concluding that the "smarty made side [...] should get play" and rating its commercial potential as 72 on a scale of 1 to 100. No chart action was reported, though.

She died of cancer at the age of 48 or, according to another source, in her early 50s.

== Discography ==
Studio albums

- Towards the end of her life, she released her first and only LP album, This Is Phylissimo on the label Tropical Recording.
