= How Long Has This Been Going On? (Sarah Vaughan album) =

Studio album by Sarah Vaughan
- Released: 1978
- Recorded: April 25, 1978
- Genre: Vocal jazz
- Length: 48:06
- Label: Pablo
- Producer: Norman Granz

Sarah Vaughan chronology
I Love Brazil! (1977)	How Long Has This Been Going On? (1978)	The Duke Ellington Songbook, Vol. 1 (1978)

Professional ratings
Review scores
Source	Rating
AllMusic	4.5/5 stars
The Penguin Guide to Jazz Recordings	3.5/4 stars

How Long Has This Been Going On? is a 1978 studio album by Sarah Vaughan, accompanied by a quartet led by Oscar Peterson.

== Track listing ==
1. "I've Got the World on a String" (Harold Arlen, Ted Koehler) – 5:38
2. "Midnight Sun" (Sonny Burke, Lionel Hampton, Johnny Mercer) – 4:40
3. "How Long Has This Been Going On?" (George Gershwin, Ira Gershwin) – 6:03
4. "You're Blasé" (Ord Hamilton, Bruce Sievier) – 5:10
5. "Easy Living" (Ralph Rainger, Leo Robin) – 4:40
6. "More Than You Know" (Edward Eliscu, Billy Rose, Vincent Youmans) – 6:46
7. "My Old Flame" (Sam Coslow, Arthur Johnston) – 6:14
8. "Teach Me Tonight" (Sammy Cahn, Gene de Paul) – 3:06
9. "Body and Soul" (Edward Heyman, Robert Sour, Frank Eyton, Johnny Green) – 3:43
10. "When Your Lover Has Gone" (Einar Aaron Swan) – 2:54

== Personnel ==
- Sarah Vaughan – vocal
- Oscar Peterson – piano
- Joe Pass – guitar
- Ray Brown – double bass
- Louie Bellson – drums
