= The Duke Ellington Songbook, Vol. 2 =

Studio album by Sarah Vaughan
- Released: 1980
- Recorded: 1979
- Studio: Group IV Studio, Hollywood and RCA Studio, New York
- Genre: Jazz
- Length: 41:04
- Label: Pablo Today
- Producer: Norman Granz

Sarah Vaughan chronology
The Duke Ellington Songbook, Vol. 1 (1980)	The Duke Ellington Songbook, Vol. 2 (1980)	Copacabana (1979)

Professional ratings
Review scores
Source	Rating
AllMusic	4.5/5 stars
The Penguin Guide to Jazz Recordings	3.5/4 stars
The Rolling Stone Jazz Record Guide	3/5 stars

The Duke Ellington Songbook, Vol. 2 is a 1980 album by Sarah Vaughan, focused on the works of Duke Ellington.

== Reception ==
Reviewing the album for Allmusic, Scott Yanow wrote that the album showed Vaughan "never did decline" and sounded in "top form throughout." Yanow chose "I Ain't Got Nothing but the Blues," "Chelsea Bridge," "Rocks in My Bed," "I Got It Bad" and "Mood Indigo" as highlights.

== Track listing ==
1. "I Ain't Got Nothin' But the Blues" (Duke Ellington, Don George) - 4:36
2. "Black Butterfly" (Ellington, Irving Mills) - 3:03
3. "Chelsea Bridge" (Billy Strayhorn) - 3:26
4. "What Am I Here For?" (Ellington, Frankie Laine) - 3:34
5. "Tonight I Shall Sleep (With a Smile on My Face)" (Ellington, Mack Gordon) - 3:59
6. "Rocks in My Bed" (Ellington) - 5:22
7. "I Got It Bad (and That Ain't Good)" (Ellington, Paul Francis Webster) - 4:31
8. "Everything But You" (Ellington, George, Harry James) - 5:29
9. "Mood Indigo" (Barney Bigard, Ellington, Mills) - 5:04
10. "It Don't Mean a Thing (If It Ain't Got That Swing)" (Ellington, Mills) - 2:29
11. "Prelude to a Kiss" (Ellington, Gordon, Mills) - 5:58
