= I Love Brazil! =

Studio album by Sarah Vaughan
- Released: 1977
- Recorded: October 31–November 7, 1977
- Genres: Bossa nova, vocal jazz
- Length: 54:43
- Label: Pablo
- Producer: Aloísio de Oliveira

Sarah Vaughan chronology
Sarah Vaughan with the Jimmy Rowles Quintet (1974)	I Love Brazil! (1977)	How Long Has This Been Going On? (1978)

I Love Brazil! is a 1977 studio album by Sarah Vaughan, accompanied by prominent Brazilian musicians Milton Nascimento, Dori Caymmi, and Antônio Carlos Jobim.

This was Vaughan's first album of bossa nova/MPB, it was followed by Copacabana (1979), and Brazilian Romance (1987). It was also her first album for Pablo Records.

== Reception ==
Professional ratings
Review scores
Source	Rating
AllMusic	3.5/5 stars
The Rolling Stone Jazz Record Guide	2/5 stars

The AllMusic review by Ron Wynn said that "Sarah Vaughan's recordings during the last phase of her magnificent career weren't always up to her usual standards, but this late-'70s set focusing on Brazilian music was a superb exception.... The backing and rhythms weren't Americanized pap, but an accurate reflection of contemporary Brazil's sound at the time."

The album garnered a Grammy nomination.

== Track listing ==
1. "If You Went Away (Preciso Aprender a Ser Só)" (Ray Gilbert, Marcos Valle, Paulo Sérgio Valle) - 4:25
2. "Triste" (Antônio Carlos Jobim) - 2:58
3. "Roses and Roses (Das Rosas)" (Dorival Caymmi, Gilbert) - 3:23
4. "Empty Faces (Vera Cruz)" (Lani Hall, Milton Nascimento) - 6:26
5. "I Live to Love You (Morrer de Amor)" (Oscar Castro-Neves, Luverci Fiorini, Gilbert) - 3:54
6. "The Face I Love (Seu Encanto)" (Gilbert, Carlos Pingarilho, M. Valle) - 3:29
7. "Courage (Coragem)" (Nascimento, Cootie Williams) - 3:42
8. "The Day It Rained (Chuva)" (Pedro Camargo, Durval Ferreira, Gilbert) - 4:40
9. "A Little Tear (Razão de Viver)" (Deodato, Gilbert, P.S. Valle) - 4:07
10. "Like a Lover (Cantador)" (Alan and Marilyn Bergman, Dori Caymmi, Nelson Motta) - 4:45
11. "Bridges (Travessia)" (Nascimento, Fernando Brant, Gene Lees) - 4:12
12. "Someone to Light Up My Life (Se Todos Fossem Iguais a Vocë)" (Jobim, Vinicius de Moraes, Lees) - 3:26

Tracks 11 and 12 are CD reissue bonus tracks.

== Personnel ==
- Sarah Vaughan - vocals
- Dorival Caymmi - vocals (3)
- Milton Nascimento - acoustic guitar, vocals (4,7,11)
- Dori Caymmi - acoustic guitar, vocals (10)
- Nelson Angelo - electric guitar (4,7,11)
- Hélio Delmiro - electric guitar (1-3,6,8-9,12)
- Danilo Caymmi - flute (4,7,11)
- Paulo Jobim - flute (4,7,11)
- Mauricio Einhorn - harmonica (8)
- Antônio Carlos Jobim - piano (2,12)
- José Roberto Bertrami - electric piano (1-3,6,8-9), organ (4,7,11)
- Edson Frederico - orchestration (1-3,5-6,8-9,12), piano (5)
- Sergio Barroso - acoustic bass (1-2,6,9,12)
- Claudio Bertrami - acoustic bass (3,8)
- Novelli - electric bass (4,7,11)
- Wilson das Neves - drums (1-3,6,8-9,12)
- Robertinho Silva - (4,7,11)
- Ariovaldo - percussion (1-4,6-7,9,11-12)
- Chico Batera - percussion (1-4,6-7,9,11-12)
- Luna - percussion (12)
- Marçal - percussion (12)

Production

- Durval Ferreira - creative director
- Sheldon Marks - design, layout design
- Norman Granz - design, layout design, liner notes
- Mário Jorge Bruno - engineer
- Tamaki Beck - mastering
- Aloísio de Oliveira - producer
