= Sarah Vaughan Sings Broadway: Great Songs from Hit Shows =

Studio album by Sarah Vaughan
- Released: 1958
- Recorded: 1958
- Genre: Vocal jazz, traditional pop
- Length: 46:08
- Label: Mercury

Sarah Vaughan chronology
Sarah Vaughan Sings George Gershwin (1958)	Sarah Vaughan Sings Broadway: Great Songs from Hit Shows (1958)	No Count Sarah (1958)

Sarah Vaughan Sings Broadway: Great Songs from Hit Shows is a 1958 studio album by Sarah Vaughan.

The album was arranged by Hal Mooney, supervised by Bob Shad.

== Track listing and original shows ==
Disc One

1. "A Tree in the Park" (Richard Rodgers, Lorenz Hart) - 2:43 - Peggy-Ann (1926)
2. "Little Girl Blue" (Rodgers, Hart) - 3:51 - Jumbo (1935)
3. "Comes Love" (Lew Brown, Charles Tobias, Sam H. Stept) - 2:34 - Yokel Boy (1939)
4. "But Not for Me" (George Gershwin, Ira Gershwin) - 3:27 - Girl Crazy (1930)
5. "My Darling, My Darling" (Frank Loesser) - 3:21 - Where's Charley? (1948)
6. "Lucky in Love" (Ray Henderson, B.G. DeSylva, Brown) - 1:55 - Good News (1937)
7. "Autumn in New York" (Vernon Duke) - 3:20 - Thumbs Up (1934)
8. "It Never Entered My Mind" (Rodgers, Hart) - 3:42 - Higher and Higher (1940)
9. "If This Isn't Love" (Burton Lane, Yip Harburg) - 2:11 - Finian's Rainbow (1947)
10. "The Touch of Your Hand" (Jerome Kern, Otto Harbach) - 2:16 - Roberta (1933)
11. "Homework" (Irving Berlin) - 3:15 - Miss Liberty (1949)
12. "Bewitched, Bothered and Bewildered" (Rodgers, Hart) - 3:31 - Pal Joey (1940)
13. "Dancing In the Dark" (Arthur Schwartz, Howard Dietz) - 2:37 - The Band Wagon (1931)
14. "September Song" (Kurt Weill, Maxwell Anderson) - 3:04 - Knickerbocker Holiday (1938)
15. "A Ship Without a Sail" (Rodgers, Hart) - 3:25 - Heads Up! (1933)
16. "Lost in the Stars" (Weill, Anderson) - 3:39 - Lost in the Stars (1949)
17. "It's Got to Be Love" (Rodgers, Hart) - 2:28 - On Your Toes (1936)
18. "All the Things You Are" (Kern, Oscar Hammerstein II) - 3:09 - Very Warm for May (1939)

Disc Two

1. "Poor Butterfly" (John Golden, John Raymond Hubbell) - 3:32 - The Big Show (1916)
2. "Let's Take an Old-Fashioned Walk" (Irving Berlin) - 2:25 - Miss Liberty (1949)
3. "My Heart Stood Still" (Rodgers, Hart) - 3:03 - A Connecticut Yankee (1927)
4. "He's Only Wonderful" (Sammy Fain, Harburg) - 3:21 - Flahooley (1951)
5. "They Say It's Wonderful" (Berlin) - 3:01 - Annie Get Your Gun (1947)
6. "My Ship" (I. Gershwin, Weill) - 2:55 - Lady in the Dark (1941)
7. "You're My Everything" (Mort Dixon, Harry Warren, Joe Young) - 2:53 - The Laugh Parade (1931)
8. "Can't We Be Friends?" (Paul James, Kay Swift) - 3:26 - The Little Show (1929)
9. "Love Is a Random Thing" (Fain, George Marion, Jr.) - 2:52 - Toplitzky of Notre Dame (1946)
10. "If I Loved You" (Hammerstein, Rodgers) - 3:28 - Carousel (1946)
11. "It's De-Lovely" (Cole Porter) - 2:46 - Red, Hot and Blue (1936)
12. "It's Love" (Leonard Bernstein, Betty Comden, Adolph Green) - 2:05 - Wonderful Town (1953)
13. "And This Is My Beloved" (George Forrest, Robert C. Wright) - 3:03 - Kismet (1953)
14. "Mr. Wonderful" (Jerry Bock, Larry Holofcener, George David Weiss) - 2:48 - Mr. Wonderful (1955)
15. "Don't Look at Me That Way" (Porter) - 2:16 - Paris (1928)
16. "I Loved Him (But He Didn't Love Me)" (Porter) - 3:21 - Wake Up and Dream (1929)
