= C'est la vie (Sarah Vaughan song) =

Single by Sarah Vaughan

from the album Sarah Vaughan in a Romantic Mood
- B-side: "Never"
- Released: 1955
- Label: Mercury
- Songwriters: Mack Wolfson, Eddie White

Audio
- "C'est la vie" on YouTube

Professional ratings
Review scores
| Source | Rating |
|---|---|
| Billboard | positive ("Spotlight" pick) |

"C'est la vie" is a song that was a hit in 1955 as recorded by Sarah Vaughan with Hugo Peretti and his orchestra for Mercury Records.

== Composition ==
The song was written by Mack Wolfson and Eddie White.

== Critical reception ==
Billboard reviewed Sarah Vaughan's recording (Mercury 70727, coupled with "Never") in its issue from 29 October 1955, noting that though there were competing recordngs of this song made by Sunny Gale and by the DeJohn Sisters, "Miss Vaughan deliver[ed] one of her top efforts in a warm, mellow voicing that could run away with all the honors."

== Commercial performance ==
Vaughan's single spent several weeks on Billboard's Most Played by Jockeys chart, peaking at number 11 in the issue dated 24 December 1955. Moreover, it appeared on the magazine's Coming Up Strong chart, peaking at No. 3 in early January.

== Charts ==
| Chart (1955) | Peak position |
|---|---|
| US Billboard Most Played by Jockeys | 11 |
