= Sarah Vaughan Sings the Mancini Songbook =

Studio album by Sarah Vaughan
- Released: 1965
- Recorded: 1965
- Genre: Vocal jazz
- Length: 39:03
- Label: Mercury
- Producer: Quincy Jones

Sarah Vaughan chronology
¡Viva! Vaughan (1965)	Sarah Vaughan Sings the Mancini Songbook (1965)	Pop Artistry of Sarah Vaughan (1966)

Professional ratings
Review scores
Source	Rating
AllMusic	3/5 stars
The Penguin Guide to Jazz Recordings	3/4 stars

Sarah Vaughan Sings the Mancini Songbook is a 1965 album by Sarah Vaughan, of music composed by Henry Mancini.

== Track listing ==
1. "How Soon" (Al Stillman) – 2:41
2. "Days of Wine and Roses" (Johnny Mercer) – 2:38
3. "Dear Heart" (Ray Evans, Jay Livingston) – 2:53
4. "Charade" (Mercer) – 2:50
5. "Too Little Time" (Don Raye) – 3:47
6. "Dreamsville" (Evans, Livingston) – 3:49
7. "Peter Gunn" (Evans, Livingston) – 1:51
8. "Moon River" (Mercer) – 2:49
9. "(I Love You and) Don't You Forget It" (Stillman) – 2:30
10. "Slow Hot Wind" (Norman Gimbel) – 3:36
11. "Mr. Lucky" (Evans, Livingston) – 2:27
12. "It Had Better Be Tonight (Meglio Stasera)" (Mercer, Franco Migliacci) – 1:44

All music composed by Henry Mancini, lyricists indicated.

== Personnel ==
- Sarah Vaughan – vocals
- Bill Holman, Billy Byers, Bob James, Frank Foster, Robert Farnon - arranger, conductor
