= The Duke Ellington Songbook, Vol. 1 =

Studio album by Sarah Vaughan
- Released: 1980
- Recorded: 1979
- Genre: Jazz, vocal jazz, jazz standards
- Length: 41:04
- Label: Pablo Today
- Producer: Norman Granz

Sarah Vaughan chronology
How Long Has This Been Going On? (1979)	The Duke Ellington Songbook, Vol. 1 (1980)	The Duke Ellington Songbook, Vol. 2 (1980)

Professional ratings
Review scores
Source	Rating
AllMusic	4.5/5 stars
The Penguin Guide to Jazz Recordings	3.5/4 stars
The Rolling Stone Jazz Record Guide	3/5 stars

The Duke Ellington Songbook, Vol. 1 is an album of Duke Ellington standards, performed by Sarah Vaughan, recorded in 1979 and released in 1980 on the Pablo Today label (a sublabel of Pablo).

== Track listing ==
1. "In a Sentimental Mood" (Duke Ellington, Manny Kurtz, Irving Mills) — 4:22
2. "I'm Just a Lucky So-and-So" (Mack David, Ellington) — 4:29
3. "(In My) Solitude" (Eddie DeLange, Ellington, Mills) — 4:25
4. "I Let a Song Go Out of My Heart" (Ellington, Mills, Henry Nemo, John Redmond) — 3:34
5. "I Didn't Know About You" (Ellington, Bob Russell — 4:10
6. "All Too Soon" (Ellington, Carl Sigman) — 3:48
7. "Lush Life" (Billy Strayhorn) — 4:30
8. "In a Mellow Tone" (Ellington, Milt Gabler) — 3:20
9. "Sophisticated Lady" (Ellington, Mills, Mitchell Parish) — 4:05
10. "Day Dream" (Ellington, John Latouche, Strayhorn) — 5:04

== Personnel ==
- Sarah Vaughan – vocals
- Billy Byers – horn, vibraphone
- Frank Foster – tenor saxophone
- J. J. Johnson – trombone
- Joe Pass – guitar
- Bucky Pizzarelli – guitar
- Waymon Reed – trumpet, flugelhorn
- Jimmy Rowles – piano
- Andy Simpkins – bass
- Zoot Sims – tenor saxophone
- Grady Tate – drums
- Frank Wess – flute, tenor saxophone
- Mike Wofford – piano
