= It's a Man's World (Sarah Vaughan album) =

Studio album by Sarah Vaughan
- Released: 1967
- Recorded: 1967
- Genre: Vocal jazz
- Length: 54:43
- Label: Mercury
- Producer: Hal Mooney

Sarah Vaughan chronology
The New Scene (1967)	It's a Man's World (1967)	Sassy Swings Again (1967)

It's a Man's World is a 1967 studio album by Sarah Vaughan, arranged by Hal Mooney, Bob James and Bob Freedman.

== Reception ==
Professional ratings
Review scores
Source	Rating
AllMusic	3/5 stars
The Penguin Guide to Jazz Recordings	3/4 stars

The AllMusic review by Ken Dryden stated that Vaughan's "lovely voice, which is in great form, is full of the adventurous spirit, as is the sole improviser on the date, stretching the boundaries of ten strong compositions".

== Track listing ==
1. "Alfie" (Burt Bacharach, Hal David) - 3:33
2. "The Man That Got Away" (Harold Arlen, Ira Gershwin) - 4:28
3. "Trouble Is a Man" (Alec Wilder) - 3:43
4. "Happiness is a Thing Called Joe" (Arlen, Yip Harburg) - 3:50
5. "For Every Man There's a Woman" (Arlen, Leo Robin) - 3:23
6. "I Got a Man Crazy for Me" (Neil Moret, Richard Whiting) - 3:31
7. "My Man (Mon Homme)" (Jacques Charles, Channing Pollack, Albert Willemetz, Maurice Yvain) - 3:52
8. "I'm Just Wild About Harry" (Eubie Blake, Noble Sissle) - 2:39
9. "Jim" (Caesar Petrillo, Edward Ross, Nelson Shawn) - 3:42
10. "Danny Boy" (Frederic Weatherly) - 4:35

== Personnel ==
- Sarah Vaughan - vocals
- Hal Mooney - Arranger
- Bob James
- Bob Freedman
