= Feelin' Good (Sarah Vaughan album) =

Studio album by Sarah Vaughan
- Released: 1972
- Recorded: November 16–26, 1971
- Genre: Vocal jazz
- Length: 54:43
- Label: Mainstream
- Producer: Bob Shad

Sarah Vaughan chronology
Sarah Vaughan with Michel Legrand (1972)	Feelin' Good (1972)	Live in Japan (1973)

Feelin' Good is a 1972 studio album by Sarah Vaughan, featuring arrangements by Allyn Ferguson, Jack Elliott, Michel Legrand, and Peter Matz.

== Track listing ==
1. "And the Feeling's Good" (Norman Gimbel, Charles Fox) - 4:20
2. "Just a Little Lovin' Early In the Mornin'" (Barry Mann, Cynthia Weil) - 3:07
3. "Alone Again (Naturally)" (Gilbert O'Sullivan) - 4:25
4. "Rainy Days and Mondays" (Roger Nichols, Paul Williams) - 3:42
5. "Deep In the Night" (Helen Miller, Eve Merriam) - 3:17
6. "Run to Me" (Barry Gibb, Robin Gibb, Maurice Gibb) - 3:00
7. "Easy Evil" (Alan O'Day) - 3:04
8. "Promise Me" (Peter Matz, Carol Hall) - 4:00
9. "Take a Love Song" (Donny Hathaway, Nadine McKinnon) - 3:25
10. "Greatest Show On Earth" (Jerry Marcellino, Mel Larson) - 3:00
11. "When You Think of It" (Robert Allen, Arthur Kent) - 4:00

== Personnel ==
- Sarah Vaughan - vocals

Arranger, conductor

- Allyn Ferguson - tracks 2, 6, 10
- Jack Elliott - tracks 2, 6, 10
- Michel Legrand - track 5
- Peter Matz - tracks 1, 3, 4, 7, 8, 9
