= Pop Artistry of Sarah Vaughan =

Studio album by Sarah Vaughan
- Released: January 22, 1966
- Recorded: 1966
- Genre: Vocal jazz, pop
- Length: 30:25
- Label: Mercury

Sarah Vaughan chronology
Sarah Vaughan Sings the Mancini Songbook (1965)	Pop Artistry of Sarah Vaughan (1966)	The New Scene (1966)

Pop Artistry of Sarah Vaughan is a 1966 studio album by Sarah Vaughan that was arranged by Luchi de Jesus.

The initial Billboard review from January 22, 1966 commented that the album was a "rewarding musical package" and a "giant for programming and sales." De Jesus's "exciting and creative" arrangements were also praised.

== Track listing ==
1. "Yesterday" (Paul McCartney, John Lennon)
2. "I Know a Place" (Tony Hatch)
3. "If I Ruled the World" (Leslie Bricusse, Cyril Ornadel)
4. "Make It Easy on Yourself" (Hal David, Burt Bacharach)
5. "He Touched Me" (Milton Schafer, Ira Levin)
6. "Habibi"
7. "What the World Needs Now Is Love" (David, Bacharach)
8. "A Lover's Concerto" (Sandy Linzer, Denny Randell)
9. "Little Hands"
10. "On a Clear Day You Can See Forever" (Burton Lane, Alan Jay Lerner)
11. "First Thing Every Morning" (Jimmy Dean)
12. "Waltz for Debbie" (Bill Evans, Gene Lees)

== Personnel ==
- Sarah Vaughan - vocals
- Luchi de Jesus - arranger, conductor
