= John Malachi =

American jazz pianist

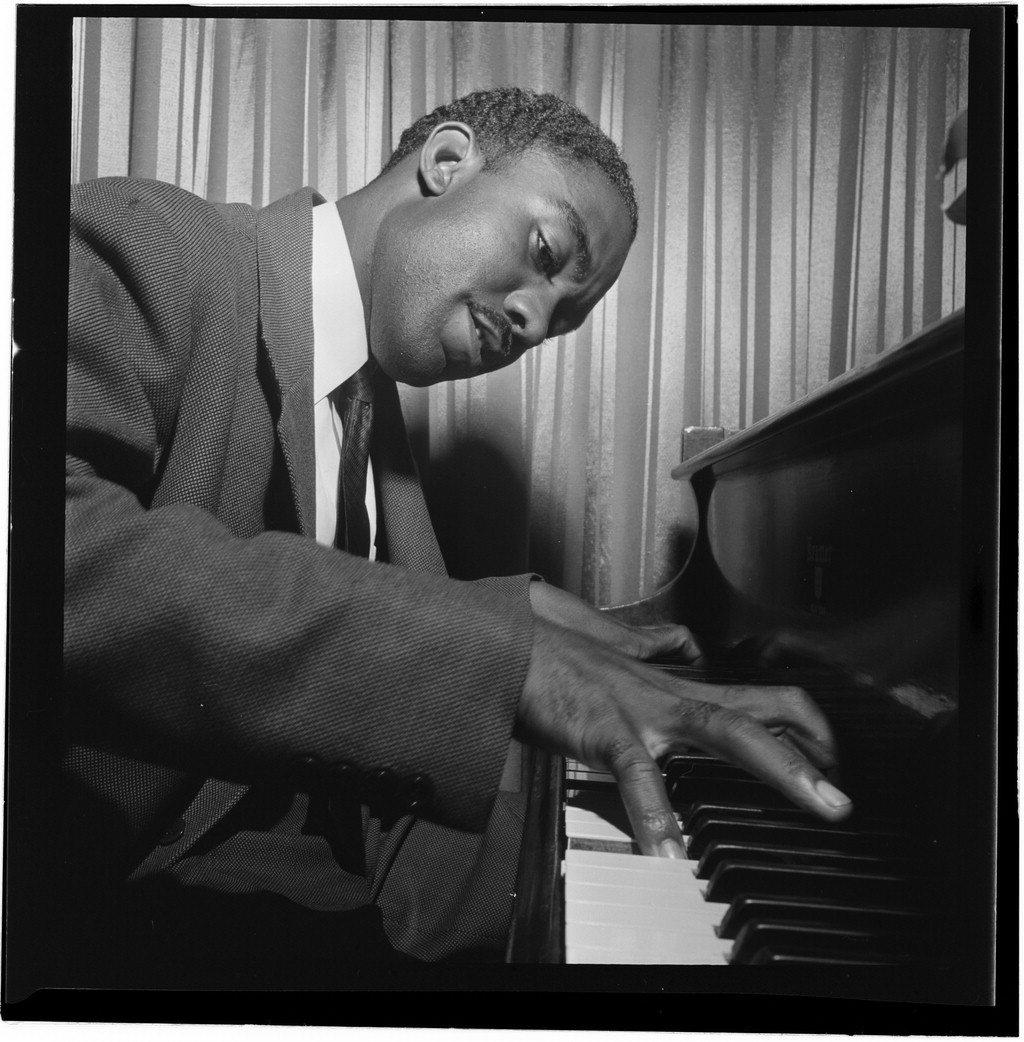

Background information
- Born: September 6, 1919 Red Springs, North Carolina, U.S.
- Died: February 11, 1987 (aged 67) Washington, D.C., U.S.
- Genres: Jazz
- Occupation: Musician
- Instrument: Piano

John Malachi (September 6, 1919 – February 11, 1987) was an American jazz pianist.

== Early life ==
Malachi was born in Red Springs, North Carolina on September 6, 1919, and grew up in Durham, North Carolina. At the age of ten he moved with his family to Washington, D.C. He was a self-taught musician.

== Later life and career ==
Malachi was a member of the epochal Billy Eckstine Bebop Orchestra in 1944–1945 and again in 1947. He also worked with Illinois Jacquet in 1948, Louis Jordan in 1951, and a series of singers including Pearl Bailey, Dinah Washington, Sarah Vaughan, Al Hibbler, and Joe Williams.

Malachi opted out of the traveling life of the touring jazz musician in the 1960s, living roughly the last decade and a half of his life in Washington, D.C. freelancing, playing with touring bands and artists when they stopped in Washington, and leading music workshops at clubs like Jimmy MacPhail's Gold Room and Bill Harris's Pig's Foot. Malachi's generosity towards younger musicians was legendary. One of the musicians he helped influence recalls that younger players referred to his workshops as "The University of John Malachi".

John Malachi is the great-grandfather of Carolyn Malachi. The singer, poet, and rap artist received a Best Urban / Alternative Performance Grammy Award nomination in 2011.
