= The New Scene =

Studio album by Sarah Vaughan
- Released: 1966
- Recorded: 1966
- Genre: Vocal jazz, pop
- Length: 31:12
- Label: Mercury

Sarah Vaughan chronology
Pop Artistry of Sarah Vaughan (1966)	The New Scene (1966)	It's a Man's World (1967)

The New Scene is a 1966 studio album by Sarah Vaughan, arranged by Luchi de Jesus.

== Reception ==
Professional ratings
Review scores
Source	Rating
AllMusic	4/5 stars

AllMusic's Jason Ankeny wrote: "Vaughan seems to grasp completely the excellence of the material at her disposal, savoring the lyrics and navigating the melodies with trademark artistry. De Jesus' buoyant arrangements are similarly perceptive, playing to Vaughan's myriad strengths while channeling the lessons of Abbey Road and Hitsville USA to subtly update her approach for a brave new world".

== Track listing ==
1. "1-2-3" (Len Barry, John Madara, David White) - 2:38
2. "What Now My Love" (Gilbert Bécaud) - 2:33
3. "Love" (Bert Kaempfert, Milt Gabler) - 2:29
4. "Who Can I Turn To?" (Leslie Bricusse, Anthony Newley) - 3:40
5. "Call Me" (Tony Hatch) - 2:52
6. "With These Hands" (Benny Davis, Abner Silver) - 4:00
7. "Michelle" (John Lennon, Paul McCartney) - 3:22
8. "Sneakin' Up on You" (Ted Daryll, Chip Taylor) - 2:23
9. "Everybody Loves Somebody" (Ken Lane, Sam Coslow, Irving Taylor) - 2:51
10. "The Shadow of Your Smile" (Johnny Mandel, Paul Francis Webster) - 3:56
11. "Dominique's Discotheque" (Roy Stragis, Horace Linsley, B. Ross) - 3:12
12. "I Should Have Kissed Him More" (Russell George, Sara Johnson) - 2:20

== Personnel ==
- Sarah Vaughan - vocals
- Luchi de Jesus, Bob James - arranger, conductor
