= ¡Viva! Vaughan =

Studio album by Sarah Vaughan
- Released: 1965
- Recorded: August 13–18, 1964
- Genre: Vocal jazz, Bossa nova
- Length: 41:40
- Label: Mercury
- Producer: Quincy Jones

Sarah Vaughan chronology
Vaughan with Voices (1964)	¡Viva! Vaughan (1965)	Sarah Vaughan Sings the Mancini Songbook (1965)

¡Viva! Vaughan is a 1965 studio album by Sarah Vaughan, orchestrated and conducted by Frank Foster, and produced by Quincy Jones.

== Reception ==
Professional ratings
Review scores
Source	Rating
Allmusic	3.5/5 stars
Record Mirror	4/5 stars

The Allmusic review by Ken Dryden awarded ¡Viva! Vaughan three and a half stars and said "Vaughan is in great voice throughout the date and the material is generally first-rate, except for the bland "Night Song"...Unfortunately, the bossa nova selections ("The Boy From Ipanema" and "Quiet Nights") are burdened with pedestrian string arrangements that date the music as much as the generally uninspired Latin percussion. It's likely that this lack of focus confused the record-buying public as to what type of music this was and caused it to be overlooked."

== Track listing ==
No.	Title	Writer(s)	Length
1.	"The Boy from Ipanema"	Vinícius de Moraes, Norman Gimbel, Antônio Carlos Jobim	2:30
2.	"Fascinating Rhythm"	George Gershwin, Ira Gershwin	2:37
3.	"Night Song"	Lee Adams, Charles Strouse	3:14
4.	"Mr. Lucky"	Ray Evans, Jay Livingston, Henry Mancini	2:29
5.	"Fever"	Eddie Cooley, Otis Blackwell	2:49
6.	"Shiny Stockings"	Frank Foster, Jon Hendricks	3:27
7.	"Avalon"	Buddy DeSylva, Al Jolson, Vincent Rose	1:48
8.	"Tea for Two"	Irving Caesar, Vincent Youmans	2:44
9.	"Corcovado"	Jobim, Gene Lees	3:23
10.	"Stompin' at the Savoy"	Benny Goodman, Andy Razaf, Edgar Sampson, Chick Webb	2:44
11.	"Moment of Truth"	Tex Satterwhite, Frank Scott	2:39
12.	"Jive Samba"	Nat Adderley	3:03
13.	"A Taste of Honey"	Ric Marlow, Bobby Scott	2:51

== Personnel ==
- Sarah Vaughan – vocals
- Jerome Richardson – flute
- Wayne Andre – trombone
- Dick Hixson – bass trombone
- Bernard Eichen – violin
- Barry Galbraith – guitar
- Bob James – piano
- Willie Bobo – percussion
- Bobby Donaldson – drums
- George Duvivier – double bass
- Frank Foster – arranger, conductor
- Quincy Jones – producer
