= A Time in My Life =

Studio album by Sarah Vaughan
- Released: December 1971
- Recorded: November 16–26, 1971
- Genre: Vocal jazz
- Length: 36:11
- Label: Mainstream
- Producer: Bob Shad

Sarah Vaughan chronology
Sassy Swings Again (1967)	A Time in My Life (1971)	Sarah Vaughan with Michel Legrand (1972)

A Time in My Life is a 1971 studio album by Sarah Vaughan, arranged by Ernie Wilkins.

== Reception ==
Professional ratings
Review scores
Source	Rating
AllMusic	3.5/5 stars
The Rolling Stone Jazz Record Guide	2/5 stars

The AllMusic review by Bruce Eder stated that Vaughan "brings an almost chameleon-like presence to this album...which encompasses a decidedly—almost defiantly—contemporary repertory...The accompaniments may almost be too busy for what the songs themselves can bear, but Vaughan always keeps up regardless of the settings and arrangements...On that basis alone, it's a lot more than a mere curio in her output from this period".

== Track listing ==
Side one
No.	Title	Writer(s)	Length
1.	"Imagine"	John Lennon	4:36
2.	"On Thinking It Over"	Brian Auger, Alan Gorrie, Jim Mullen	3:27
3.	"Inner City Blues (Make Me Wanna Holler)"	Marvin Gaye, James Nyx	4:08
4.	"Sweet Gingerbread Man"	Michel Legrand, Alan and Marilyn Bergman	3:00
5.	"Magical Connection"	John Sebastian	2:37

Side two
No.	Title	Writer(s)	Length
1.	"That's the Way I've Always Heard It Should Be"	Carly Simon, Jacob Brackman	4:55
2.	"Tomorrow City"	Brian Auger	3:12
3.	"Universal Prisoner"	Helen Lewis, Kay Lewis	4:04
4.	"Trouble"	Brian Auger, Jim Mullen	2:55
5.	"If Not For You"	Bob Dylan	2:47

1991 Mainstream Records CD (MDCD704)

No.	Title	Writer(s)	Length
1.	"Inner City Blues (Make Me Wanna Holler)"	Marvin Gaye, James Nyx	4:08
2.	"On Thinking It Over"	Brian Auger, Alan Gorrie, Jim Mullen	3:27
3.	"Imagine"	John Lennon	4:36
4.	"Sweet Gingerbread Man"	Michel Legrand, Alan and Marilyn Bergman	3:00
5.	"Magical Connection"	John Sebastian	2:37
6.	"That's the Way I've Always Heard It Should Be"	Carly Simon, Jacob Brackman	4:55
7.	"Tomorrow City"	Brian Auger	3:12
8.	"Universal Prisoner"	Helen Lewis, Kay Lewis	4:04
9.	"Trouble"	Brian Auger, Jim Mullen	2:55
10.	"If Not For You"	Bob Dylan	2:47
11.	"Run to Me"	Barry Gibb, Robin Gibb, Maurice Gibb	3:02
12.	"Easy Evil"	Alan O'Day	3:06

== Personnel ==
- Sarah Vaughan – vocals
- Albert Vescovo, Joe Pass - guitar
- Bob Magnusson - bass
- Bill Mays - piano
- Earl Palmer - drums
- Alan Estes, Jimmy Cobb - percussion
- Jackie Kelso, Jerome Richardson, William Green - saxophone
- Al Aarons, Buddy Childers, Gene Goe - trumpet
- Benny Powell, George Bohanon - trombone
- Ernie Wilkins – arranger
