= Make Yourself Comfortable =

Single by Sarah Vaughan
- B-side: "Idle Gossip"
- Released: 1954
- Label: Mercury
- Songwriter: Bob Merrill

Professional ratings
Review scores
| Source | Rating |
|---|---|
| Billboard | positive |

"Make Yourself Comfortable" is a song written by Bob Merrill and commonly associated with singer Sarah Vaughan, whose recording rose to number six on Billboard.

== Critical reception and commerial performance ==
Billboard reviewed Sarah Vaughan's single (Mercury 10649, with "Idle Gossip" on the flip side) in its issue from 6 November 1954, praising "a new and commercial Sarah" and her "outstanding reading" of the "out-of-ordinary" song. The reviewer concluded: "It's a mighty appealing disk and it could bring the thrush a big hit."

Other recordings of the song were made at the time by Andy Griffith (with Jean Wilson) and by Peggy King, but Vaughan's version proved to be the most popular one.

== Charts ==
| Chart (1955) | Peak position |
|---|---|
| US Billboard Most Played by Jockeys | 6 |
