= Send In the Clowns (1974 Sarah Vaughan album) =

Send in the Clowns

Studio album by Sarah Vaughan
- Released: 1974
- Genre: Vocal jazz, soul, pop
- Length: 33:28
- Label: Mainstream
- Producer: Bob Shad

Sarah Vaughan chronology
Live in Japan (1973)	Send in the Clowns (1974)	Sarah Vaughan with the Jimmy Rowles Quintet (1975)

Send In the Clowns is an album by jazz singer Sarah Vaughan that was released by Mainstream Records in 1974.

Professional ratings
Review scores
Source	Rating
Allmusic	.

== Track listing ==
1. "Send in the Clowns" (Stephen Sondheim) – 3:27
2. "Love Don't Live Here Anymore" (Rose Marie McCoy, Ginny Redington) – 3:04
3. "That'll Be Johnny" (Helen Miller, Rose Marie McCoy) – 2:43
4. "Right in the Next Room" (Helen Miller, Rose Marie McCoy) – 2:59
5. "I Need You More (Than Ever Now)" (Helen Miller, Rose Marie McCoy) – 2:53
6. "On Thinking It Over" (Brian Auger, Jim Mullen) –3:26
7. "Do Away with April" (Helen Miller, Howard Greenfield) – 3:30
8. "Wave" (Antônio Carlos Jobim) – 3:26
9. "Got to Go See If I Can't Get Daddy to Come Back Home" (Helen Miller, Rose Marie McCoy) – 2:58
10. "Fraiser (The Sensuous Lion)" (Johnny Mercer, Jimmy Rowles) – 4:15

== Personnel ==
- Vocals by Sarah Vaughan
- Arranged and conducted by Paul Griffiths (1), Gene Page (2-5, 7, 9), Ernie Wilkins (6), Michel Legrand (8), and Wade Marcus (10)
- Produced by Bob Shad
- Recorded in New York City and Los Angeles, 1973–74
