= Our Very Own (1950 film) =

1950 film by David Miller

- Film poster
- Directed by: David Miller
- Written by: F. Hugh Herbert
- Produced by: Samuel Goldwyn
- Starring: Ann Blyth; Farley Granger
- Cinematography: Lee Garmes
- Edited by: Sherman Todd
- Music by: Victor Young
- Production company: Samuel Goldwyn Productions
- Distributed by: RKO Radio Pictures
- Release date: July 27, 1950
- Running time: 93 minutes
- Country: United States
- Language: English
- Box office: $2,050,000 (US rentals)

Our Very Own is a 1950 American drama film directed by David Miller and starring Ann Blyth, Farley Granger and Jane Wyatt. The screenplay written by F. Hugh Herbert focuses on a teenage girl who learns that she was adopted as an infant.

== Plot ==
Los Angeles teenager Gail Macaulay is going steady with deliveryman Chuck, a relationship that sparks jealousy in her younger sister Joan. When Joan needs her birth certificate in order to obtain summer employment, her mother Lois tells her to look in a box in her dresser, where Joan discovers Gail's adoption papers.

That evening at Gail's 18th birthday party, Joan flirts with Chuck, and when her angry sister confronts her, Joan reveals the truth about her background. The following morning, Lois informs Gail that her biological father was killed in an accident before she was born, but her mother, Gert Lynch, is alive. Gail persuades Lois to ask their lawyer to arrange a meeting with her birth mother, but Lois visits Gert in her Long Beach home first. Gert is thrilled to see photographs of Gail but does not wish let her second husband Jim know that she has a child, so Lois arranges a meeting the following evening, when Jim will be away.

After Gail and her friend Zaza depart for Gert's home, Lois receives a panicked phone call from Gert telling her that Jim has canceled his plans and is staying home to play cards with friends. Gert waits for the girls outside her house, but before they arrive, Jim asks her to prepare refreshments. When Gail enters the house, Gert introduces her as the daughter of an old friend. Gert quietly explains the situation to Gail and apologizes for the mixup.

Gail returns to the car and tells Zaza that the reunion went well, and then asks whether she can spend the night at her house. Chuck, who had arrived at the Macaulay home just before Gail left for the reunion with Gert, has spent a worried night with Gail's parents after having the situation explained to him. When Gail fails to return home, Gail's parents begin to worry and Chuck goes to Zaza's house and reproaches Gail for hurting the people who raised and loved her as their own.

Gail learns that Zaza's father will not be attending their high-school graduation ceremony, having chosen to attend an out-of-town party instead. At the graduation ceremony, Gail imbues her speech as senior-class vice president with a loving message about the true meaning of family, to the delight of her parents, sisters and Chuck.

== Cast ==
- Ann Blyth as Gail Macaulay
- Farley Granger as Chuck
- Jane Wyatt as Lois Macaulay
- Donald Cook as Fred Macaulay
- Ann Dvorak as Gert Lynch
- Joan Evans as Joan Macaulay
- Natalie Wood as Penny Macaulay
- Phyllis Kirk as Zaza
- Jessie Grayson as Violet
- Martin Milner as Bert
- Ray Teal as Jim Lynch

== Production ==
Producer Samuel Goldwyn wanted to return to the simple family values portrayed in the Andy Hardy films that MGM had released a decade earlier. Farley Granger thought the script was "pointless and meandering", but as a Goldwyn contract player, he faced suspension if he refused to make the film. He felt that director David Miller was "a perfectly nice man", but "no help to anybody".

Jane Wyatt, on loan from 20th Century Fox, was disappointed to find herself cast as an advice-dispensing mother after having played a succession of sophisticated roles opposite Gary Cooper, Cary Grant, and Gregory Peck. She had little regard for the role until a few years later, when she was cast in the successful television series Father Knows Best as a direct result of her performance in Our Very Own.

== Release ==
Farley Granger refused to attend the film's premiere unless Goldwyn paid Granger's substantial bill at the Savoy Hotel in London, and Goldwyn reluctantly agreed.

== Reception ==
In a contemporary review for The New York Times, critic Bosley Crowther wrote: "What is there so disturbing about the knowledge of being an adopted child? This picture doesn't tell you. All that it arbitrarily does is assume that the knowledge would be upsetting and then proceeds from there—proceeds to tug at the heartstrings with close-ups and weeping violins and Ann Dvorak sniffling profusely as a regretful woman who abandoned her infant child. And then, after this has been worked over for a sufficiently heartrending while, the picture hops back to teen-age clowning and a belief that all's right with the world. No, thank you, Mr. Goldwyn. There is more to the problem than this. Adoption deserves clarification with something better than farcical laughs and corny sobs."

== Awards ==
The film was nominated for the Academy Award for Best Sound (Gordon E. Sawyer), but lost to All About Eve.

== Comic-book adaption ==
- Eastern Color Movie Love #5 (October 1950)

== See also ==
- "Our Very Own" (song), a song from the film. The song was an instant hit, and many artists recorded their versions of it.
