= Hal Mooney =

American composer

- Born: February 4, 1911; Brooklyn, New York, U.S.
- Died: March 23, 1995 (aged 84); Studio City, Los Angeles, California, U.S.
- Education: Brooklyn Law School; St. John's University School of Law; New York University
- Occupations: Composer, arranger

Harold "Hal" Mooney (February 4, 1911 – March 23, 1995) was an American composer and arranger.

== Early life and career ==
Hal Mooney was born in Brooklyn, New York. As a young man, Mooney was a professional pianist. He attended Brooklyn and St. John's Law Schools. After studying music under New York University professor Orville Mayhood and then under the influential Joseph Schillinger, he was invited to join the arrangers' roster for the popular Hal Kemp Orchestra, alongside John Scott Trotter (who was about to leave the band) and Lou Busch.

Mooney then moved to the Jimmy Dorsey Orchestra, but World War II was breaking out and soon he was called up by the United States Army.

== Hollywood ==
On his return from the war, Mooney became a freelance arranger in Hollywood and started to make a name for himself, providing charts for top vocalists such as Bing Crosby, Frank Sinatra, Judy Garland, Peggy Lee, Kay Starr, and Billy Eckstine. His well-known arrangement of Kay Starr's hit, "Wheel of Fortune" in the early 1950s, led to his contract with Mercury Records in New York City.

== The Mercury years ==
In 1956, Mooney finally swapped freelancing for an exclusive contract, becoming in-house arranger and A&R Director at Mercury Records, where he would remain until the late 1960s. There, he provided arrangements for more top singers, including Sarah Vaughan, Dinah Washington, Helen Merrill, Ernestine Anderson and, on Mercury's parent label Philips Records, Nina Simone.

Mooney was described as a "nuts and bolts arranger" by fellow chart writer Billy May. It was meant as a compliment, and Mooney's versatility can be characterised by some of the more notable arrangements he wrote at the Mercury stable. For Vaughan, he provided lush, string settings (along with more brassy, upbeat numbers) on albums such as Great Songs From Hit Shows (1956) and Sarah Vaughan Sings George Gershwin (1957). Though those arrangements grated with some jazz purists, their dramatic qualities inspired the acclaimed singer to some of her finest work, for example Hit Shows' "It Never Entered My Mind" and the Gershwin album's Isn't It a Pity?. Apart from such highbrow projects, Mooney also arranged some of Vaughan's forays into R&B-inspired '50s pop, for example the Clyde Otis-penned "Sweet Affection" (1957).

Mooney's numerous arrangements for Dinah Washington, meanwhile, ranged from straight big band swing, through Latin mambo to rhythm and blues, but the seven albums on which he worked with Simone, between 1964 and 1967, display the greatest versatility. Though they contain the occasional string-backed track not unlike Mooney's classic work with Vaughan, they took him a world away from it at other times. For example, Simone's final Philips album, High Priestess of Soul (1967), is a diverse combination of pop, jazz and gospel. Mooney's two best-known arrangements for Simone, "I Put A Spell On You" and "Feelin' Good", might be quite different in some ways to his earlier work with Vaughan, but the same sense of drama is evident.

In his A&R capacity, Mooney helped to woo Xavier Cugat to Mercury, and he also produced several albums, including Dizzy Gillespie's Jambo Caribe (1964) and Vaughan's penultimate work for Mercury It's a Man's World (1967), for which Mooney also arranged some of the songs.

== As composer and recording artist ==
Mooney recorded numerous orchestral albums in his own name, such as Ballet With A Beat (1961), which fused famous ballet melodies such as "Dance of the Sugar Plum Fairy" and "Sabre Dance" with West Coast jazz, and the earlier Musical Horoscope, for which Mooney composed a different tune for each of the signs of the zodiac.

Having joined ASCAP in 1936, Mooney's compositions included "Rigamarole", "Hodge-Podge", "Jumpin' Jiminy", "Sing, It's Good For Ya", and "Goin' to Town".

== The Universal years ==
Philips decided to phase out the Mercury label in the late 1960s and so Mooney moved on to Universal Studios, where he became musical director on many of the most popular TV shows of the 1970s, including Columbo, Kojak, Marcus Welby, M.D., Ellery Queen, The Six Million Dollar Man, The Bionic Woman, Kolchak: The Night Stalker and The Rockford Files. His film work included the score to the Richard Burton war film Raid on Rommel (1971), as well as television movies such as The Longest Night (1972), Runaway! (1973), Sunshine (1973), Death Race (1973), A Case of Rape (1974) and The Execution of Private Slovik (1974).

== Later life ==
Hal Mooney retired after composing the musical score to the 1977 television series The Storyteller. He died in the apt location of Studio City, Los Angeles, California in 1995 at the age of 84. He was cremated. His ashes were given to his family.

== Partial discography ==
=== As arranger ===
With Judy Garland

- Miss Show Business (Capitol, 1955)

With Billy Eckstine

- Broadway, Bongos and Mr. B (Mercury, 1961)

With Beverly Kenney

- Born to Be Blue (Decca, 1959)

With Helen Merrill

- Merrill at Midnight (EmArcy, 1957)
- The Nearness of You (EmArcy, 1957)

With Nina Simone

- Broadway-Blues-Ballads (Philips, 1964)
- I Put a Spell on You (Verve, 1965)

With Sarah Vaughan

- Sassy (EmArcy, 1956)
- Sarah Vaughan and Billy Eckstine Sing the Best of Irving Berlin (Mercury, 1957)
- Sarah Vaughan Sings George Gershwin (Mercury, 1957)
- It's a Man's World (Mercury, 1967)
- Sarah Vaughan Sings Broadway: Great Songs from Hit Shows (Mercury, 1958)

With Dinah Washington

- Dinah! (EmArcy, 1956)
- In the Land of Hi-Fi (EmArcy, 1957)

With Esther Ofarim

- Away From You / Healing River (Philips, 1964)
- Dirty Old Town / Oh Babe, You're Gonna Wonder (Philips, 1965)
