= Broken Hearted Melody =

Single by Sarah Vaughan
- B-side: "Misty"
- Written: 1957
- Released: July 1959
- Genre: Pop
- Length: 2:23
- Label: Mercury
- Composer: Sherman Edwards
- Lyricist: Hal David

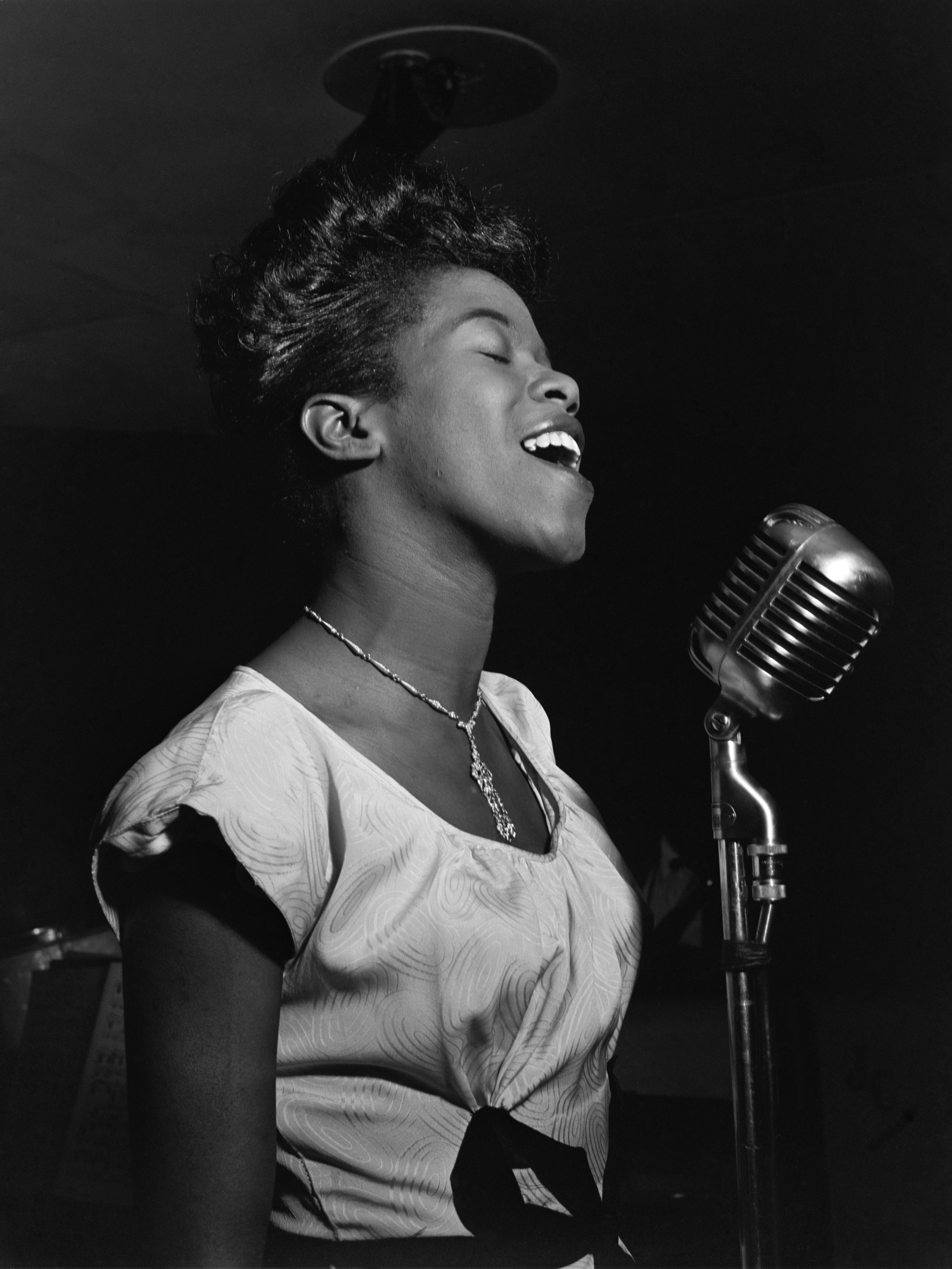
Sarah Vaughan, ca. August 1946.

"Broken Hearted Melody" is a popular song written by Hal David and Sherman Edwards. It was recorded by Sarah Vaughan and it became a hit for Vaughan, reaching No. 7 on Billboard Hot 100 in 1959.

== Background ==
Hal David wrote the lyrics for "Broken Hearted Melody", with Sherman Edwards writing the music instead of his better-known collaborator Burt Bacharach. Sarah Vaughan recorded the song in early 1958, left it for over a year before releasing it around the first of July 1959. It was initially released as the B-side to "Misty", but flipped when "Broken Hearted Melody" proved more popular with the public. "Broken Hearted Melody" became one of Sarah Vaughan's biggest hits, yielding Vaughan her first million seller. It was also Vaughan's first song to receive a Grammy nomination at the 2nd Annual Grammy Awards for Best Performance By A "Top 40" Artist. It became part of her concert repertoire for many years afterwards.

== Chart performance ==
The song became a major hit for Vaughan, peaking at No. 7 in the Billboard Charts in September 1959, and No. 5 on the R&B charts in October 1959. This version was released by Mercury Records under catalog number 957085. The song was also released in the UK, where it first entered the charts on September 11, 1959, and spent 11 weeks there, also peaking at No. 7.

=== Charts ===
| Chart (1959–1960) | Peak position |
|---|---|
| Belgium (Ultratop 50 Flanders) | 8 |
| Belgium (Ultratop 50 Wallonia) | 19 |
| Canada (CHUM Hit Parade) | 3 |
| Netherlands (Single Top 100) | 19 |
| UK Singles (Official Charts) | 7 |
| US (Billboard Hot 100) | 7 |
| US (Billboard Hot R&B Sides) | 5 |
