= Sarah Vaughan with Michel Legrand =

Studio album by Sarah Vaughan
- Released: 1972
- Recorded: April 17–20, 1972
- Genre: Vocal jazz
- Length: 54:43
- Label: Mainstream
- Producer: Bob Shad

Sarah Vaughan chronology
A Time in My Life (1971)	Sarah Vaughan with Michel Legrand (1972)	Feelin' Good (1972)

Sarah Vaughan with Michel Legrand is a 1972 studio album by Sarah Vaughan, arranged by Michel Legrand.

The ten songs on the original LP album were composed by Legrand with lyrics by Alan and Marilyn Bergman. Some reissues have included two bonus tracks arranged and conducted by Legrand but composed by others.

Legrand won the Grammy Award for Best Instrumental Arrangement Accompanying Vocalist(s) at the 15th Annual Grammy Awards for his arrangement of "What Are You Doing the Rest of Your Life?".

== Reception ==
Professional ratings
Review scores
Source	Rating
Allmusic	3/5 stars
The Rolling Stone Jazz Record Guide	2/5 stars

The Allmusic review by Ron Wynn awarded the album three stars and said that the album was "a meeting that worked better than anyone might expect. Vaughan was still her dynamic, charismatic vocal self, while Legrand didn't obscure or dilute her singing, and also effectively supported her in his own way".

== Track listing ==
1. "The Summer Knows (Theme from Summer of '42)" - 3:03
2. "What Are You Doing the Rest of Your Life?" - 3:56
3. "Once You've Been in Love" - 3:14
4. "Hands of Time (Brian's Song)" - 3:06
5. "I Was Born in Love with You" - 3:08
6. "I Will Say Goodbye" - 2:11
7. "Summer Me, Winter Me" - 2:47
8. "His Eyes, Her Eyes" - 3:23
9. "Pieces of Dreams" - 3:08
10. "Blue, Green, Grey and Gone" - 4:15
11. "Wave" (Antônio Carlos Jobim) - 3:30
12. "Deep in the Night" (Helen Miller, Eve Merriam) - 3:18

All music composed by Michel Legrand, with all lyrics written by Alan and Marilyn Bergman, other writers noted.

== Personnel ==
- Sarah Vaughan - vocals
- Pete Christlieb, Bob Cooper, Bernard Fleischer, Bill Hood, Jerome Richardson, Bud Shank - flute, reeds (multiple)
- Vincent DeRosa, Bill Hinshaw, Sinclair Lott, Dick Macker, Arthur Maebe, Richard Perissi, George Price, Ralph Pyle - French horn
- Bobby Knight, Charles Loper, Grover Mitchell, George Roberts, Frank Rosolino, Lloyd Ulyate - trombone
- Al Aarons, Gary Barone, Conte Candoli, Buddy Childers, Chuck Findley - trumpet
- Tommy Johnson - tuba
- Dave Grusin, Arthur Kane, Mike Wofford - keyboards
- Larry Bunker - percussion
- Tommy Tedesco - guitar
- Chuck Rainey - bass guitar
- Chuck Berghofer, Ray Brown, Bob Magnusson - double bass
- John Guerin, Shelly Manne - drums
- Michel Legrand - arranger, conductor, piano
