= Our Very Own (song) =

Single by Sarah Vaughan
- B-side: "Don't Be Afraid"
- Released: 1950
- Length: 3:10
- Label: Columbia
- Songwriters: Jack Elliott; Victor Young

"Our Very Own" is a song that was featured in the 1950 film Our Very Own and was a hit in that year for Sarah Vaughan, who recorded it for Columbia with the orchestra under the direction of Norman Leyden.

== Composition ==
The song was written by Jack Elliott and Victor Young.

== Release and critical reception ==
Sarah Vaughan's version
Review scores
Source	Rating
Billboard	79/100
Metronome	B

Jo Stafford's version
Review scores
Source	Rating
Billboard	83/100

The song was an instant hit, many artists released their versions of it.

In its issue from 24 June 1950, the Billboard magazine listed three single records of the song available for purchase: by the Charlie Spivak Orchestra (on London), by Sarah Vaughan (on Columbia) and by the Victor Young Orchestra and Chorus (on Decca). In December. a Bennie Green version (on Jubilee) was listed.

Billboard reviewed Sara Vaughan's recording (Columbia 38860, coupled with "Don't Be Afraid") on 1 July 1950, writing "The thrush again is in top form for a straight reading of a new and pretty flicker title tune. Could be a winner" and rating it 80 ("excellent") for disk jockeys and 79 ("good") overall. Metronome in its review called Norman Leyden's orchestral accompaniment "dull", rating the side "B".

Charlie Spivak's side was rated by Billboard 71 out of 100, Joe Graydon's (Coral 60265, c/w "If I Had a Magic Carpet") 75, Victor Young's 86.

Jo Stafford's version (Capitol 1142, c/w "Goodnight, Irene") was reviewed on 5 August and rated 83.

== Commercial performance ==
Vaughan's single peaked at No. 15 on Billboard's Records Most Played by Disk Jockeys chart in the issue dated 19 August 1950.

In 1951, the song charted on Billboard's England's Top Twenty (without indication of particular artists or recordings involved).

== Charts ==
Sarah Vaughan's version

Chart (1950)	Peak position
US Billboard Records Most Played by Disk Jockeys	15
