= (I Love the Girl) I Love the Guy =

Single by Sarah Vaughan
- B-side: "Summertime"
- Released: 1950
- Label: Columbia
- Songwriter: Cy Coben

"(I Love the Girl) I Love the Guy", or simply "I Love the Guy", is a song written by Cy Coben that was a hit in 1950 for Sarah Vaughan, who recorded it for Columbia with the orchestra under the direction of Norman Leyden.

== Critical reception ==
Professional ratings
Review scores
Source	Rating
Billboard	80/100
Metronome	B+

Billboard reviewed Sara Vaughan's recording (Columbia 38925, coupled with "Thinking of You") in its issue from 26 August 1950, first commending the "live, beatful [orchestral] support" and then the singer, who "knock[ed] out some of her style stunts" on the "growing rhythm ditty." "One of her finest Columbia efforts," concluded the reviewer and rated the song 80 ("excellent") for disk jockeys and 80 ("excellent") overall.

== Commercial performance ==
Vaughan's single debuted at No. 10 on Billboard's Records Most Played by Disk Jockeys chart in September 1950.

The song was also a No. 22 hit for Fran Warren in the same year.

== Charts ==
Chart (1950)	Peak position
US Billboard Records Most Played by Disk Jockeys	10
