= You're Mine You =

Studio album by Sarah Vaughan
- Released: March 1962
- Recorded: 1962
- Studio: Universal (Chicago)
- Genre: Vocal jazz
- Length: 41:40
- Label: Roulette
- Producer: Jack Tracy

Sarah Vaughan chronology
After Hours (1961)	You're Mine You (1962)	The Explosive Side of Sarah Vaughan (1963)

You're Mine You is a 1962 studio album by the American jazz singer Sarah Vaughan, orchestrated and conducted by Quincy Jones.

== Reception ==
Professional ratings
Review scores
Source	Rating
Allmusic	3/5 stars
New Record Mirror	4/5 stars

The Allmusic review by Scott Yanow awarded the album three stars and said that "Vaughan's voice is typically wondrous and sometimes a bit excessive on the ballads (some may find her slightly overblown version of 'Maria' a bit difficult to sit through) but in top form on the more swinging numbers."

== Track listing ==
1. "You're Mine You" (Johnny Green, Edward Heyman) – 3:59
2. "The Best Is Yet to Come" (Cy Coleman, Carolyn Leigh) – 2:59
3. "Witchcraft" (Coleman, Leigh) – 2:55
4. "So Long" (Remus Harris, Irving Melsher, Russ Morgan) – 2:52
5. "The Second Time Around" (Sammy Cahn, Jimmy Van Heusen) – 3:40
6. "I Could Write a Book" (Lorenz Hart, Richard Rodgers) – 2:21
7. "Maria" (Leonard Bernstein, Stephen Sondheim) – 3:11
8. "Baubles, Bangles and Beads" (George Forrest, Robert C. Wright) – 3:39
9. "Fly Me to the Moon" (Bart Howard) – 2:54
10. "Moonglow" (Eddie DeLange, Will Hudson, Irving Mills) – 2:28
11. "Invitation" (Bronisław Kaper, Paul Francis Webster) – 2:16
12. "On Green Dolphin Street" (Kaper, Ned Washington) – 3:01

Bonus tracks on compact disc

13. "One Mint Julep" (Rudy Toombs) – 2:46
14. "(Mama) He Treats Your Daughter Mean" (Herb Lance, Charlie Singleton, Chester Wallace) – 2:39

== Personnel ==
- Sarah Vaughan – vocals
- Quincy Jones - arranger, conductor
