= Sarah Vaughan =

American jazz singer and pianist (1924–1990)

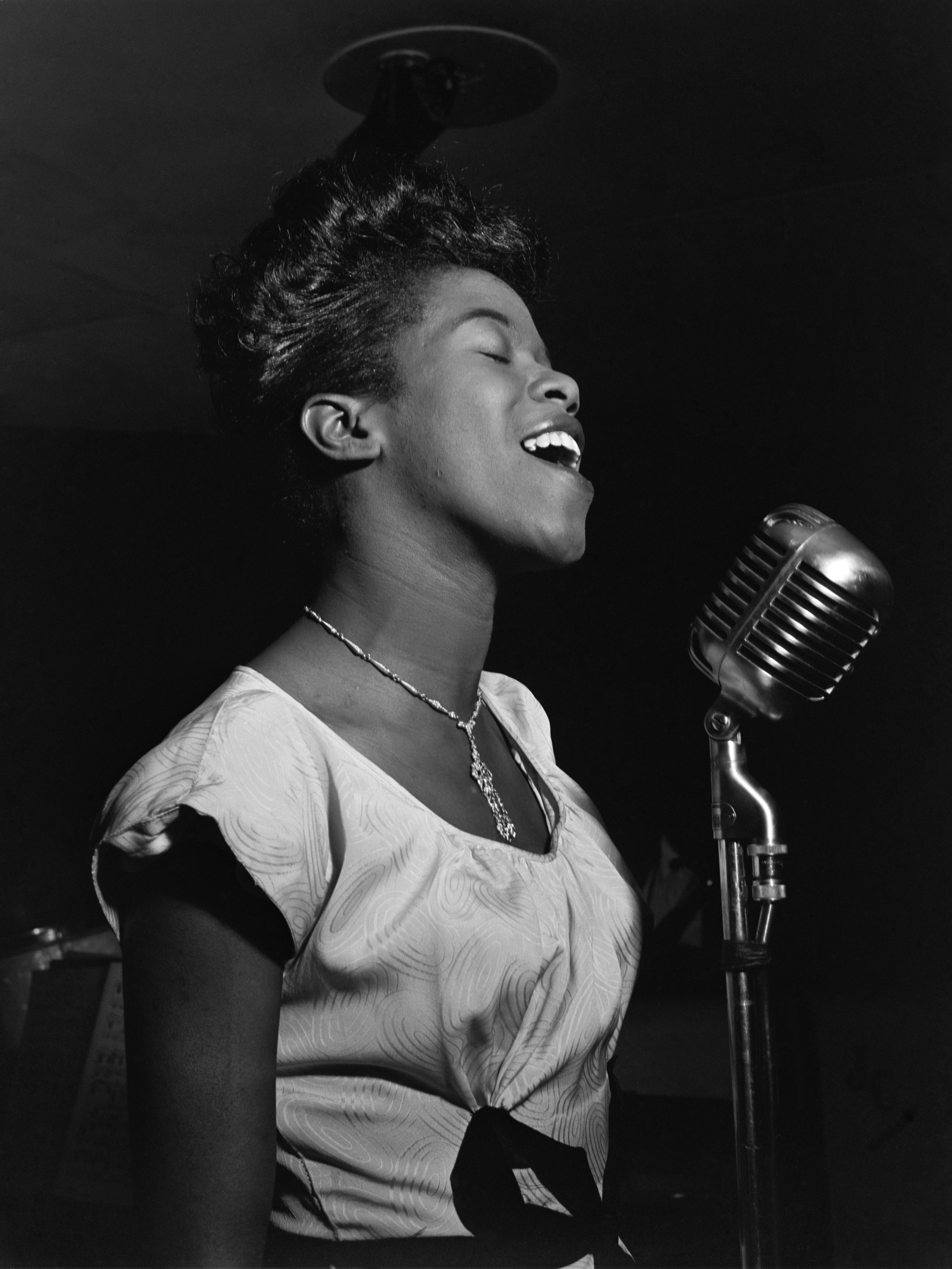
- Vaughan, c. 1946

Background information
- Born: Sarah Lois Vaughan; March 27, 1924; Newark, New Jersey, U.S.
- Died: April 3, 1990 (aged 66) Hidden Hills, California, U.S.
- Genres: Jazz; bebop; vocal pop; bossa nova
- Occupation: Singer
- Instruments: Vocals; piano
- Years active: 1942–1990
- Labels: Columbia; Mercury; Verve; Roulette; Pablo

Sarah Lois Vaughan (/vɔːn/ VAWN; March 27, 1924 – April 3, 1990) was an American jazz singer and pianist. Nicknamed "Sassy", "The Divine One", and the "Queen of Bebop", music critic Scott Yanow wrote that she had "one of the most wondrous voices of the 20th century". Her accolades include the 1989 NEA Jazz Masters honor, and a Grammy Award from a total of nine nominations. Vaughan is also the recipient of the Grammy Lifetime Achievement Award.

== Early life ==
Vaughan was born in Newark, New Jersey, to Asbury "Jake" Vaughan, a carpenter by trade who played guitar and piano, and Ada Vaughan, a laundress who sang in the church choir, migrants from Virginia. The Vaughans lived in a house on Brunswick Street in Newark for Vaughan's entire childhood.

Jake was deeply religious. The family was active in New Mount Zion Baptist Church at 186 Thomas Street. Vaughan began piano lessons at the age of seven, sang in the church choir, and played piano for rehearsals and services. Sarah and her family were all registered Democrats.

She developed an early love for popular music. In the 1930s, she frequently saw local and touring bands at the Montgomery Street Skating Rink. By her mid-teens, she ventured illegally into Newark's night clubs and performed as a pianist and singer at the Piccadilly Club and at Newark Airport.

Vaughan attended East Side High School, then transferred to Newark Arts High School, which opened in 1931. As her nocturnal adventures as a performer overtook her academic pursuits, she dropped out of high school during her junior year to concentrate more fully on her music.

== Career ==
=== 1942–1943: Early career ===
Vaughan was frequently accompanied by a friend, Doris Robinson, on her trips into New York City. In the fall of 1942, by which time she was 18 years old, Vaughan suggested that Robinson enter the Apollo Theater Amateur Night contest. Vaughan played piano accompaniment for Robinson, who won second prize. Vaughan later decided to go back and compete as a singer herself. She sang "Body and Soul" and won—although the date of this victorious performance is uncertain. The prize, as Vaughan recalled to Marian McPartland, was $10 and the promise of a week's engagement at the Apollo. On November 20, 1942, she returned to the Apollo to open for Ella Fitzgerald.

During her week of performances at the Apollo, Vaughan was introduced to bandleader and pianist Earl Hines, although the details of that introduction are disputed. Billy Eckstine, Hines' singer at the time, has been credited by Vaughan and others with hearing her at the Apollo and recommending her to Hines. Hines claimed later to have discovered her himself and offered her a job on the spot. After a brief tryout at the Apollo, Hines replaced his female singer with Vaughan on April 4, 1943.

=== 1943–1944: Earl Hines and Billy Eckstine ===
Vaughan spent the remainder of 1943 and part of 1944 touring the country with the Earl Hines big band, which featured Billy Eckstine. She was hired as a pianist so Hines could hire her under the jurisdiction of the musicians' union (American Federation of Musicians) rather than the singers union (American Guild of Variety Artists). But after Cliff Smalls joined the band as a trombonist and pianist, her duties were limited to singing. The Earl Hines band in this period is remembered as an incubator of bebop, as it included trumpeter Dizzy Gillespie, saxophonist Charlie Parker (playing tenor saxophone rather than alto), and trombonist Bennie Green. Gillespie arranged for the band, although the contemporary recording ban by the musicians' union meant that no commercial recordings exist.

Eckstine quit the Hines band in late 1943 and formed a big band with Gillespie, leaving Hines to become the band's musical director. Parker joined Eckstine, and over the next few years the band included Gene Ammons, Art Blakey, Miles Davis, Kenny Dorham, Dexter Gordon, and Lucky Thompson. Vaughan accepted Eckstine's invitation to join his band in 1944, giving her the opportunity to record for the first time on December 5, 1944, on the song "I'll Wait and Pray" for De Luxe. Critic and producer Leonard Feather asked her to record later that month for Continental with a septet that included Dizzy Gillespie and Georgie Auld. She left the Eckstine band in late 1944 to pursue a solo career, although she remained close to Eckstine and recorded with him frequently.

Pianist John Malachi is credited with giving Vaughan the moniker "Sassy", a nickname that matched her personality. She liked it, and the name and its shortened variant "Sass" stuck with colleagues and the press. In written communications, Vaughan often spelled it "Sassie".

=== 1945–1948: Early solo career ===
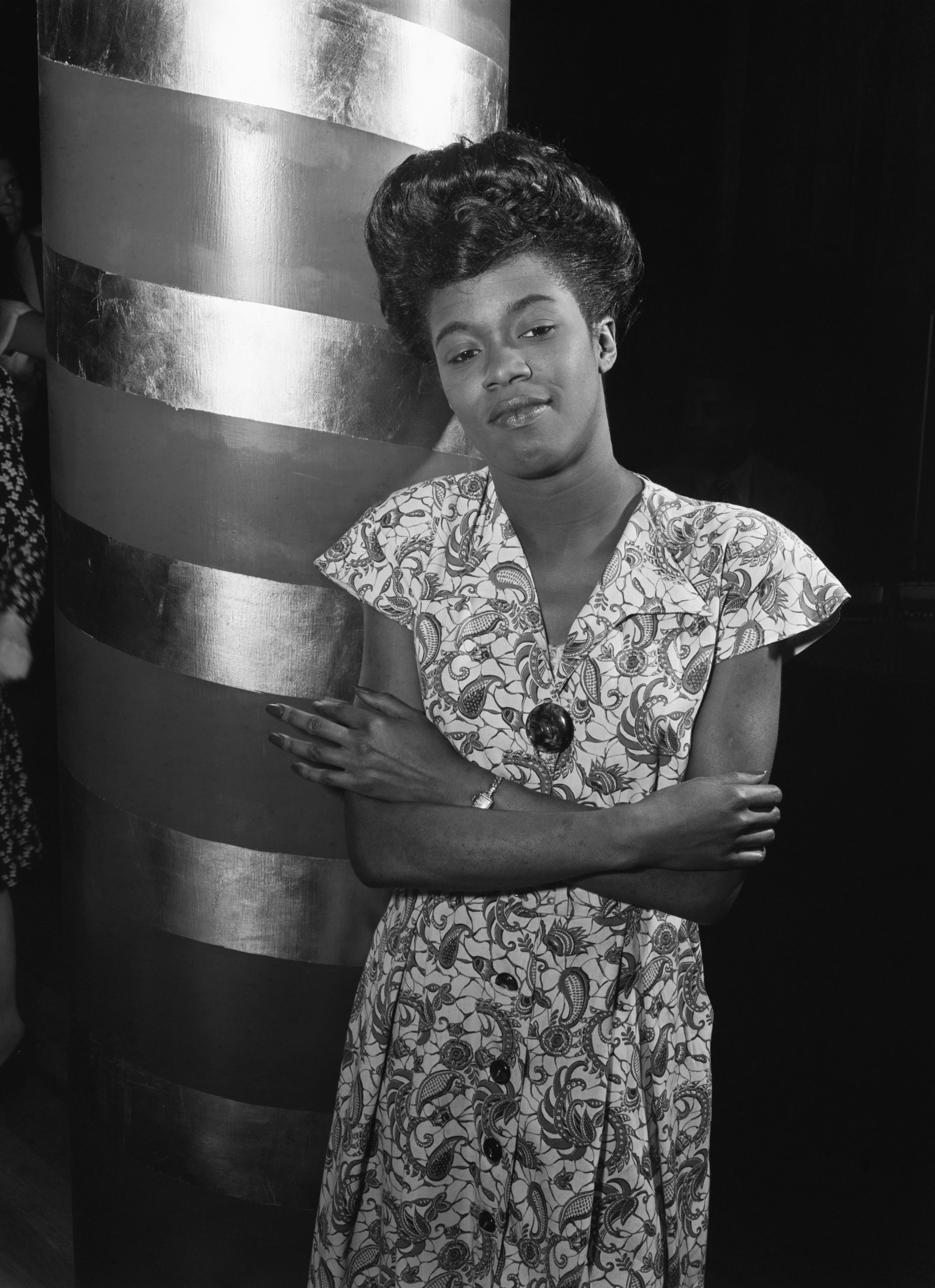
At Café Society, September 1946

Vaughan began her solo career in 1945 by freelancing on 52nd Street in New York City at the Three Deuces, the Famous Door, the Downbeat, and the Onyx Club. She spent time at Braddock Grill next to the Apollo Theater in Harlem. On May 11, 1945, she recorded "Lover Man" for Guild with a quintet featuring Gillespie and Parker with Al Haig on piano, Curly Russell on double bass, and Sid Catlett on drums. Later that month, she went into the studio with a slightly different and larger Gillespie/Parker aggregation and recorded three more sides.

After being invited by violinist Stuff Smith to record the song "Time and Again" in October 1945, Vaughan was offered a contract to record for Musicraft by owner Albert Marx, although she would not begin recording as a leader for Musicraft until May 7, 1946. In the intervening time, she recorded for Crown and Gotham and began performing regularly at Café Society Downtown, an integrated club in New York's Sheridan Square.

While at Café Society, Vaughan became friends with trumpeter George Treadwell, who became her manager. She delegated to him most of the musical director responsibilities for her recording sessions, allowing her to concentrate on singing. Over the next few years, Treadwell made changes in Vaughan's stage appearance. Aside from a new wardrobe and hair style, she had her teeth capped, eliminating a gap between her two front teeth.

Her recordings for Musicraft included "If You Could See Me Now" (written and arranged by Tadd Dameron), "Don't Blame Me", "I've Got a Crush on You", "Everything I Have Is Yours" and "Body and Soul". With Vaughan and Treadwell's professional relationship on solid footing, the couple married on September 16, 1946.

In 1947, Vaughan performed at the third Cavalcade of Jazz concert held at Wrigley Field in Los Angeles that was produced by Leon Hefflin, Sr. on September 7, 1947. The Valdez Orchestra, The Blenders, T-Bone Walker, Slim Gaillard, The Honeydrippers, Johnny Otis and his Orchestra, Woody Herman, and the Three Blazers also performed that same day.

Vaughan's recording success for Musicraft continued through 1947 and 1948. Her recording of "Tenderly"—she was proud to be the first to have recorded that jazz standard—became an unexpected pop hit in late 1947. Her December 27, 1947, recording of "It's Magic" (from the Doris Day film Romance on the High Seas) found chart success in early 1948. Her recording of "Nature Boy" from April 8, 1948, became a hit around the time the popular Nat King Cole version was released. Because of a second recording ban by the musicians' union, "Nature Boy" was recorded with an a cappella choir.

=== 1948–1953: Stardom and the Columbia years ===
The musicians' union ban pushed Musicraft to the brink of bankruptcy. Vaughan used the missed royalty payments as an opportunity to sign with the larger Columbia record label. After the settling of legal issues, her chart successes continued with "Black Coffee" in the summer of 1949. While at Columbia through 1953, she was steered almost exclusively to commercial pop ballads, several with success on the charts: "That Lucky Old Sun", "Make Believe (You Are Glad When You're Sorry)", "I'm Crazy to Love You", "Our Very Own", "I Love the Guy", "Thinking of You" (with pianist Bud Powell), "I Cried for You", "These Things I Offer You", "Vanity", "I Ran All the Way Home", "Sinner or Saint", "My Tormented Heart", and "Time".

She won Esquire magazine's New Star Award for 1947, awards from Down Beat magazine from 1947 to 1952, and from Metronome magazine from 1948 to 1953. Recording and critical success led to performing opportunities, with Vaughan singing to large crowds in clubs around the country during the late 1940s and early 1950s. In the summer of 1949, she made her first appearance with a symphony orchestra in a benefit for the Philadelphia Orchestra entitled "100 Men and a Girl." Around this time, Chicago disk jockey Dave Garroway coined a second nickname for her, "The Divine One", that would follow her throughout her career. One of her early television appearances was on DuMont's variety show Stars on Parade, (1953–54) in which she sang "My Funny Valentine" and "Linger Awhile".

In 1949, with their finances improving, Vaughan and Treadwell bought a three-story house on 21 Avon Avenue in Newark, occupying the top floor during their increasingly rare off-hours at home and moving Vaughan's parents to the lower two floors. However, business pressures and personality conflicts led to a cooling in Treadwell and Vaughan's relationship. Treadwell hired a road manager to handle her touring needs and opened a management office in Manhattan so he could work with other clients.

Vaughan's relationship with Columbia soured as she became dissatisfied with the commercial material and its lackluster financial success. She made some small-group recordings in 1950 with Miles Davis and Bennie Green, but they were atypical of what she recorded for Columbia.

==== Radio ====
In 1949, Vaughan had a radio program, Songs by Sarah Vaughan, on WMGM in New York City. The 15-minute shows were broadcast in the evenings on Wednesday through Sunday from The Clique Club, described as "rendezvous of the bebop crowd." She was accompanied by George Shearing on piano, Oscar Pettiford on double bass, and Kenny Clarke on drums.

=== 1954–1959: Mercury years ===
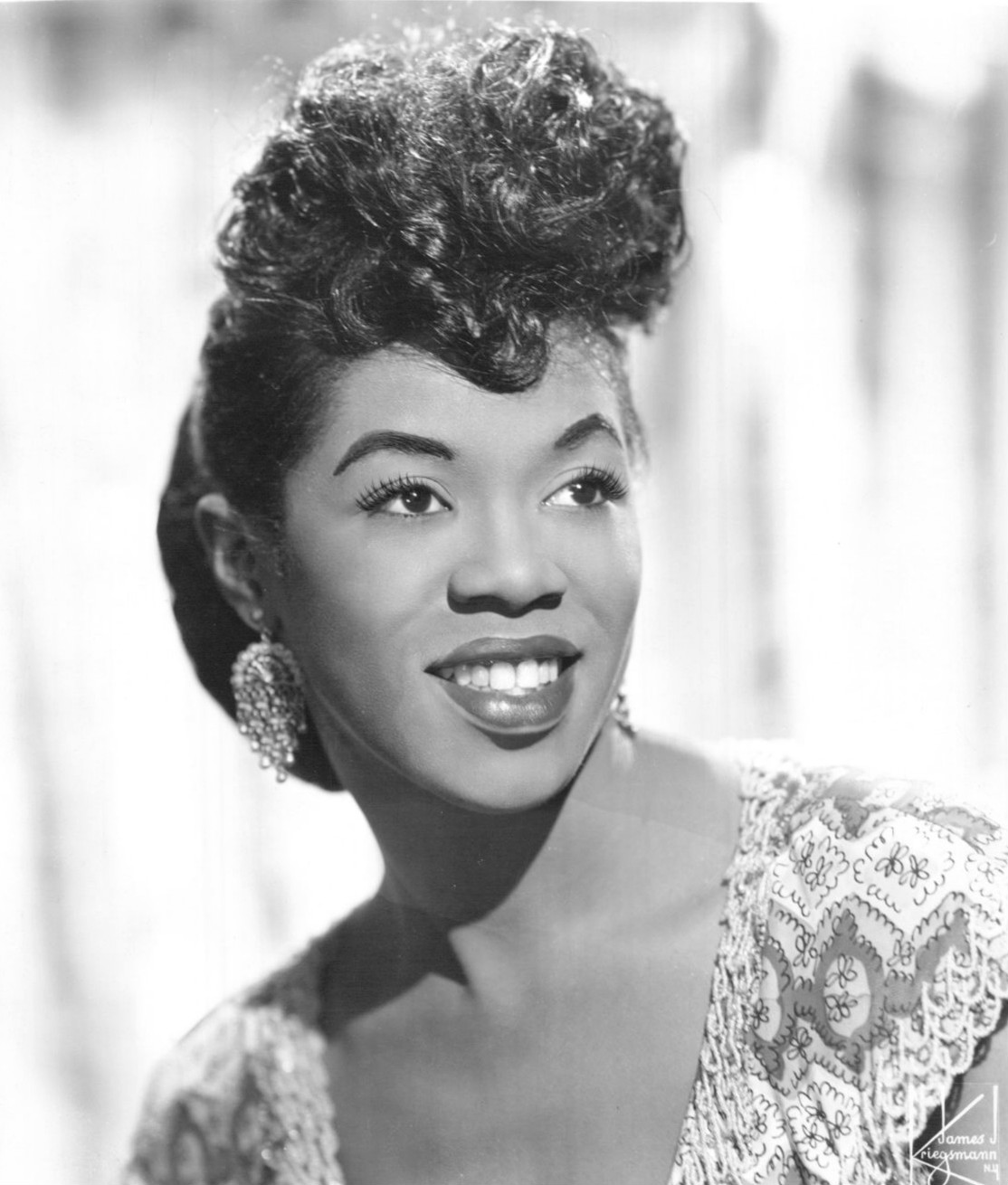
Vaughan in 1955

In 1953, Treadwell negotiated a contract for Vaughan with Mercury in which she would record commercial material for Mercury and jazz-oriented material for its subsidiary, EmArcy. She was paired with producer Bob Shad, and their working relationship yielded commercial and artistic success. Her debut recording session at Mercury took place in February 1954. She remained with Mercury through 1959. After recording for Roulette from 1960 to 1963, she returned to Mercury from 1964 to 1967.

Her commercial success at Mercury began with the 1954 hit "Make Yourself Comfortable", recorded in the fall of 1954, and continued with "How Important Can It Be" (with Count Basie), "Whatever Lola Wants", "The Banana Boat Song", "You Ought to Have a Wife", and "Misty". Her commercial success peaked in 1959 with "Broken Hearted Melody", a song she considered "corny" which nevertheless became her first gold record, and a regular part of her concert repertoire for years to come. Vaughan was reunited with Billy Eckstine for a series of duet recordings in 1957 that yielded the hit "Passing Strangers". Her commercial recordings were handled by a number of arrangers and conductors, primarily Hugo Peretti and Hal Mooney.

The jazz "track" of her recording career proceeded apace, backed either by her working trio or combinations of jazz musicians. One of her favorite albums was a 1954 sextet date that included Clifford Brown.

In the latter half of the 1950s, she followed a schedule of almost non-stop touring. She was featured at the first Newport Jazz Festival in the summer of 1954 and starred in subsequent editions of that festival at Newport and in New York City for the remainder of her life. In the fall of 1954, she performed at Carnegie Hall with the Count Basie Orchestra on a bill that also included Billie Holiday, Charlie Parker, Lester Young and the Modern Jazz Quartet. That fall, she again toured Europe before embarking on a "Big Show" U.S. tour, a succession of performances that included Count Basie, George Shearing, Erroll Garner and Jimmy Rushing. At the 1955 New York Jazz Festival on Randalls Island, Vaughan shared the bill with the Dave Brubeck quartet, Horace Silver, Jimmy Smith, and the Johnny Richards Orchestra.

Although the professional relationship between Vaughan and Treadwell was quite successful through the 1950s, their personal relationship finally reached a breaking point and she filed for a divorce in 1958. Vaughan had entirely delegated financial matters to Treadwell, and despite significant income figures reported through the 1950s, at the settlement Treadwell said that only $16,000 remained. The couple evenly divided the amount and their personal assets, terminating their business relationship.

She made her UK debut in 1958 on Sunday Night at the London Palladium with several songs including "Who's Got the Last Laugh Now".

=== 1959–1969: Atkins and Roulette ===
The exit of Treadwell from Vaughan's life was precipitated by the entry of Clyde "C.B." Atkins, a man of uncertain background whom she had met in Chicago and married on September 4, 1958. Although Atkins had no experience in artist management or music, Vaughan wished to have a mixed professional and personal relationship like the one she had with Treadwell. She made Atkins her manager, although she was still feeling the sting of the problems she had with Treadwell and initially kept a closer eye on Atkins. Vaughan and Atkins moved into a house in Englewood Cliffs, New Jersey.

When Vaughan's contract with Mercury ended in late 1959, she signed on with Roulette, a small label owned by Morris Levy, who was one of the backers of Birdland, where she frequently appeared. She began recording for Roulette in April 1960, making a string of large ensemble albums arranged or conducted by Billy May, Jimmy Jones, Joe Reisman, Quincy Jones, Benny Carter, Lalo Schifrin, and Gerald Wilson. She had pop chart success in 1960 with "Serenata" on Roulette and "Eternally" and "You're My Baby", a couple of residual tracks from her Mercury contract. She recorded After Hours (1961) with guitarist Mundell Lowe and double bassist George Duvivier and Sarah + 2 (1962) with guitarist Barney Kessel and double bassist Joe Comfort.

In 1961, Vaughan and Atkins adopted a daughter, Deborah Lois Atkins, known professionally as Paris Vaughan. However, the relationship with Atkins proved difficult and violent. After several incidents, she filed for divorce in November 1963. She turned to two friends to help sort out the financial affairs of the marriage. Club owner John "Preacher" Wells, a childhood acquaintance, and Clyde "Pumpkin" Golden Jr. discovered that Atkins' gambling and spending had put Vaughan around $150,000 in debt. The Englewood Cliffs house was seized by the IRS for nonpayment of taxes. Vaughan retained custody of their child and Golden took Atkins' place as Vaughan's manager and lover for the remainder of the decade.

When her contract with Roulette ended in 1963, Vaughan returned to the more familiar confines of Mercury. In the summer of 1963, she went to Denmark with producer Quincy Jones to record Sassy Swings the Tivoli, an album of live performances with her trio. During the next year, she made her first appearance at the White House for President Lyndon Johnson and danced with the president afterwards. The Tivoli recording would be the brightest moment of her second stint with Mercury. Changing demographics and tastes in the 1960s left jazz musicians with shrinking audiences and inappropriate material. Although she retained a following large and loyal enough to maintain her career, the quality and quantity of her recorded output dwindled as her voice darkened and her skill remained undiminished. At the conclusion of her Mercury deal in 1967, she lacked a recording contract for the remainder of the decade.

=== 1970–1982: Fisher and Mainstream ===
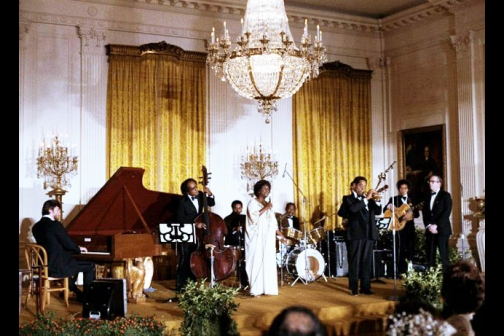
Dizzy Gillespie and Vaughan perform at the White House in honor of the Shah of Iran on November 15, 1977.

In 1971, at the Tropicana in Las Vegas, Marshall Fisher was a concession stand employee and fan when he was introduced to Sarah Vaughan. They were attracted to each other immediately. Fisher moved in with her in Los Angeles. Although he was white and seven years older, he got along with her friends and family. Although he had no experience in the music business, he became her road manager, then personal manager. But unlike other men and managers, Fisher was devoted to her and meticulously managed her career and treated her well. He wrote love poems to her.

In 1971, Bob Shad, who had worked with her as a producer at Mercury, asked her to record for his label, Mainstream, which he had founded after leaving Mercury. Breaking a four-year hiatus, Vaughan signed a contract with Mainstream and returned to the studio for A Time in My Life, a step away from jazz into pop music with songs by Bob Dylan, John Lennon, and Marvin Gaye arranged by Ernie Wilkins. She didn't complain about this eclectic change in direction, but she chose the material for her next album after admiring the work of Michel Legrand. He conducted an orchestra of over one hundred musicians for Sarah Vaughan with Michel Legrand, an album of compositions by Legrand with lyrics by Alan and Marilyn Bergman. The songs brought some of the musicians to tears during the sessions. But Shad wanted a hit, and the album yielded none. She sang a version of the pop hit "Rainy Days and Mondays" by the Carpenters for Feelin' Good. This was followed by Live in Japan, her first live album since 1963. Sarah Vaughan and the Jimmy Rowles Quintet (1974) was more experimental, containing free improvisation and some unconventional scatting.

Send in the Clowns was another attempt to increase sales by breaking into the pop music market. Vaughan disliked the songs and hated the album cover depicting a clown with an afro. She filed a lawsuit against Shad in 1975 on the belief that the cover was inconsistent with the formal, sophisticated image she projected on stage. She also contended that the album Sarah Vaughan: Live at the Holiday Inn Lesotho had an incorrect title and that Shad had been harming her career. Although she disliked the album, she liked the song "Send in the Clowns" written by Stephen Sondheim for the musical A Little Night Music. She learned it on piano, made many changes with the help of pianist Carl Schroeder, and it became her signature song.

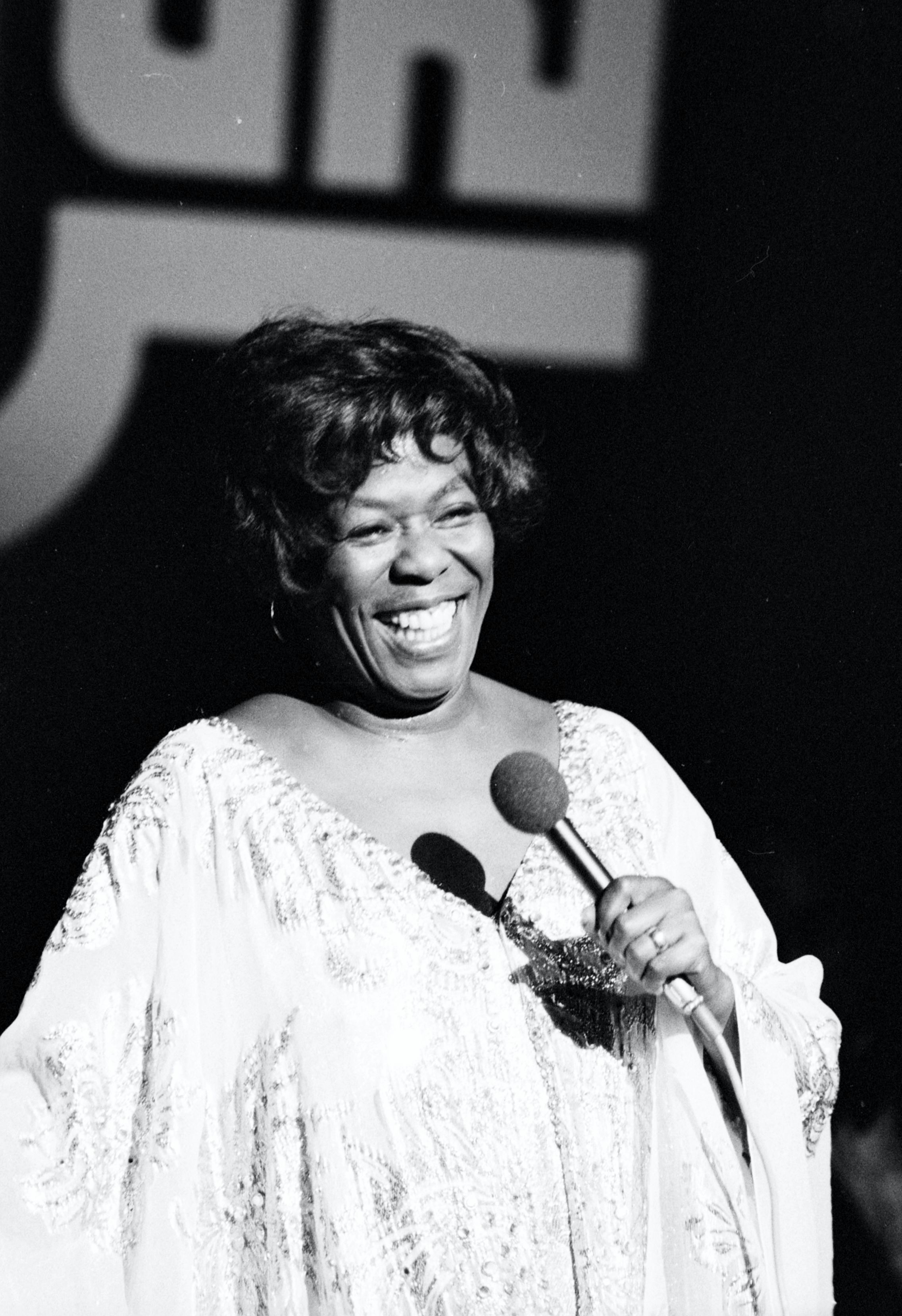
Vaughan in 1978

In 1974, she performed music by George Gershwin at the Hollywood Bowl with the Los Angeles Philharmonic. The orchestra was conducted by Michael Tilson Thomas, who was a fan of Vaughan and invited her to perform. Thomas and Vaughan repeated the performance with Thomas' home orchestra in Buffalo, New York, followed by appearances in 1975 and 1976 with other symphony orchestras in the United States.

After leaving Mainstream, she signed with Atlantic and worked on an album of songs by John Lennon and Paul McCartney that were arranged by Marty Paich and his son, David Paich of the rock band Toto. She was enthusiastic to be more involved in the making of an album, but Atlantic rejected it on the claim that it contained no hits. "I don't know how they can recognize hits in advance", she said. Atlantic canceled her contract. She said, "I don't give a damn about record companies any more."

In early 1977, Sarah Vaughan sang a duet with Kevin Godley on "Lost Weekend", a song featured on the triple-LP concept album Consequences by Godley & Creme. As Paul Gambuccini writes in the album's accompanying booklet: "The nicest surprise of the last month was Sarah's Vaughan's two-hour visit to duet with Kevin on 'Lost Weekend'. The sassy lady not only blew the Britons out the studio door with her powerful vocal but supervised the washing up in the Manor kitchen."

=== Rio and Norman Granz ===
In 1977, filmmaker Thomas Guy followed Vaughan on tour to film the documentary Listen to the Sun. She traveled throughout South America: Argentina, Colombia, Chile, Ecuador, and Peru. She was enamored of Brazil, as this was her third tour of Brazil in six years. In the documentary, she called the city of Rio "the greatest place I think I've ever been on earth". Audiences were so enthusiastic that she said, "I don't believe they like me that much." After rejection by Atlantic, she wanted to try producing her own album of Brazilian music. She asked Aloísio de Oliveira to run the sessions and recorded I Love Brazil! with Milton Nascimento, Jose Roberto Bertrami, Dorival Caymmi, and Antonio Carlos Jobim.

She had an album but no label to release it, so she signed to Pablo run by Norman Granz. She had known Granz since 1948 when she performed on one of his Jazz at the Philharmonic tours. He was the record producer and manager for Ella Fitzgerald and the owner of Verve. After selling Verve, he started Pablo. He was dedicated to acoustic, mainstream jazz and had recorded Count Basie, Duke Ellington, and Clark Terry. In 1978 he recorded Vaughan's How Long Has This Been Going On?, a set of jazz standards with veteran jazz musicians Oscar Peterson, Joe Pass, Ray Brown, and Louis Bellson. The album was nominated for a Grammy Award. Pablo released I Love Brazil! and it, too, was nominated for a Grammy.

=== 1982–1989: Late career ===
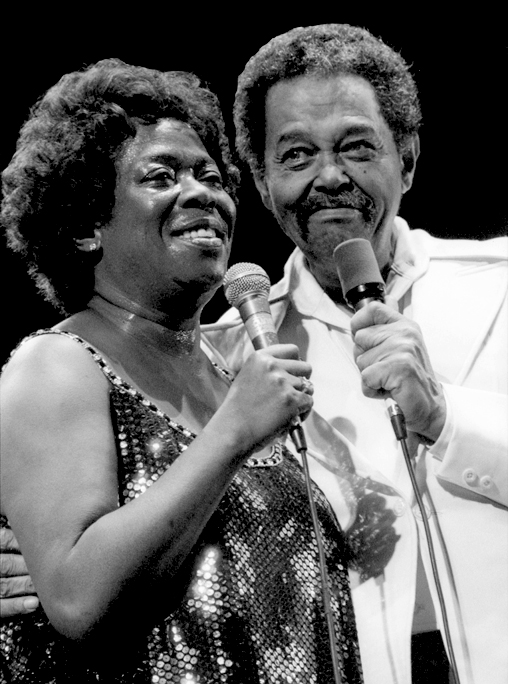
Vaughan and Billy Eckstine at Monterey Jazz Festival in 1981

In the summer of 1980, she received a plaque on 52nd Street outside the CBS Building (Black Rock) commemorating the jazz clubs she had once frequented on "Swing Street" and which had long since been replaced with office buildings. A performance of her symphonic Gershwin program with the New Jersey Symphony in 1980 was broadcast on PBS and won her an Emmy Award the next year for Individual Achievement, Special Class. She was reunited in 1982 with Tilson Thomas for a modified version of the Gershwin program, played again by the Los Angeles Philharmonic but this time in its home hall, the Dorothy Chandler Pavilion; the CBS recording of the concert Gershwin Live! won a Grammy for Best Jazz Vocal Performance, Female.

After the end of her contract with Pablo in 1982, she committed to a limited number of studio recordings. She made a guest appearance in 1984 on Barry Manilow's 2:00 AM Paradise Cafe, an album of pastiche compositions with established jazz musicians. In 1984, she participated in The Planet is Alive, Let It Live a symphonic piece composed by Tito Fontana and Sante Palumbo on Italian translations of Polish poems by Karol Wojtyla, better known as Pope John Paul II. The recording was made in Germany with an English translation by writer Gene Lees and was released by Lees on his private label after the recording was rejected by the major labels.

In 1985, Vaughan reconnected with her longstanding, continually growing European audience during a celebratory concert at the Chatelet Theater in Paris. Released posthumously on the Justin Time label, In the City of Lights is a two-disc recording of the concert, which covers the highlights of Vaughan's career while capturing a beloved singer at the height of her powers. Thanks in part to the hard-swinging telepathic support of pianist Frank Collett (who answers each of her challenges then coaxes the same from her), Sarah reprises Tad Dameron's "If You Could See Me Now" with uncommon power, her breathstream effecting a seamless connection between chorus and bridge. For the Gershwin Medley, drummer Harold Jones swaps his brushes for sticks to match energy and forcefulness that does not let up until the last of many encores. On June 16, 1985, Vaughan appeared at the Playboy Jazz Festival.

In 1986, Vaughan sang "Happy Talk" and "Bali Ha'i" in the role of Bloody Mary on a studio recording by Kiri Te Kanawa and José Carreras of the score of the Broadway musical South Pacific, while sitting on the studio floor. Vaughan's final album was Brazilian Romance, produced by Sérgio Mendes with songs by Milton Nascimento and Dori Caymmi. It was recorded primarily in the early part of 1987 in New York and Detroit. In 1988, she contributed vocals to an album of Christmas carols recorded by the Mormon Tabernacle Choir with the Utah Symphony Orchestra and sold in Hallmark Cards stores. In 1989, Quincy Jones' album Back on the Block included Vaughan in a brief scatting duet with Ella Fitzgerald. This was her final studio recording. It was her only studio recording with Fitzgerald in a career that had begun 46 years earlier opening for Fitzgerald at the Apollo.

The video Sarah Vaughan Live from Monterey was taped in 1983 or 1984 with her trio and guest soloists. Sass and Brass was taped in 1986 in New Orleans with guests Dizzy Gillespie and Maynard Ferguson. Sarah Vaughan: The Divine One was part of the American Masters series on PBS. Also in 1986, on Independence Day in a program nationally televised on PBS she performed with the National Symphony Orchestra conducted by Mstislav Rostropovich, in a medley of songs composed by George Gershwin.

== Death ==
In 1989, Vaughan's health began to decline, although this did not initially stop her performing, as she gave a show in February. She canceled a series of engagements in Europe in 1989, citing the need to seek treatment for arthritis of the hand, although she was able to complete a series of performances in Japan. During a run at New York's Blue Note Jazz Club in 1989, she was diagnosed with lung cancer and was too ill to finish the last day of what would turn out to be her final series of public performances.

Vaughan returned to her home in California to begin chemotherapy and spent her final months alternating stays in the hospital and at home. She grew weary of the struggle and demanded to be taken home, where at the age of 66 she died on the evening of April 3, 1990, while watching Laker Girls, a television movie featuring her daughter.

Her funeral was held at Mount Zion Baptist Church in Newark, New Jersey. Following the ceremony, a horse-drawn carriage transported her body to Glendale Cemetery, Bloomfield.

== Vocal commentary ==
Parallels have been drawn between Vaughan's voice and those of opera singers. Jazz singer Betty Carter said that with training Vaughan could have "gone as far as Leontyne Price." Bob James, Vaughan's musical director in the 1960s said that "the instrument was there. But the knowledge, the legitimacy of that whole world were not for her ... But if the aria were in Sarah's range she could bring something to it that a classically trained singer could not."

In a chapter devoted to Vaughan in his book Visions of Jazz (2000), critic Gary Giddins described her as the "ageless voice of modern jazz – of giddy postwar virtuosity, biting wit and fearless caprice". He concluded by saying that "No matter how closely we dissect the particulars of her talent ... we must inevitably end up contemplating in silent awe the most phenomenal of her attributes, the one she was handed at birth, the voice that happens once in a lifetime, perhaps once in several lifetimes."

Her voice had wings: luscious and tensile, disciplined and nuanced, it was as thick as cognac, yet soared off the beaten path like an instrumental solo ... that her voice was a four-octave muscle of infinite flexibility made her disarming shtick all the more ironic." – Gary Giddins

Her obituary in The New York Times described her as a "singer who brought an operatic splendor to her performances of popular standards and jazz." Jazz singer Mel Tormé said that she had "the single best vocal instrument of any singer working in the popular field." Her ability was envied by Frank Sinatra, who said, "Sassy is so good now that when I listen to her I want to cut my wrists with a dull razor." The New York Times critic John S. Wilson said in 1957 that she possessed "what may well be the finest voice ever applied to jazz." It was close to its peak until shortly before her death at the age of 66. Late in life, she retained a "youthful suppleness and remarkably luscious timbre" and was capable of the projection of coloratura passages described as "delicate and ringingly high".

Vaughan had a large vocal range of soprano through a female baritone, exceptional body, volume, a variety of vocal textures, and superb and highly personal vocal control. Her ear and sense of pitch were almost perfect, and there were no difficult intervals.

In her later years, her voice was described as a "burnished contralto" and as her voice deepened with age her lower register was described as having "shades from a gruff baritone into a rich, juicy contralto". Her use of her contralto register was likened to "dipping into a deep, mysterious well to scoop up a trove of buried riches." Musicologist Henry Pleasants noted, "Vaughan who sings easily down to a contralto low D, ascends to a pure and accurate [soprano] high C."

Vaughan's vibrato was described as "an ornament of uniquely flexible size, shape and duration," as well as "voluptuous" and "heavy." Vaughan was accomplished in her ability to "fray" or "bend" notes at the extremities of her vocal range. It was noted in a 1972 performance of Lionel Bart's "Where Is Love?" that "In mid-tune she began twisting the song, swinging from the incredible cello tones of her bottom register, skyrocketing to the wispy pianissimos of her top."

She held a microphone in live performance, using its placement as part of her performance. Her placings of the microphone allowed her to complement her volume and vocal texture, often holding the microphone at arm's length and moving it to alter her volume.

She frequently used the song "Send in the Clowns" to demonstrate her vocal abilities in live performance. The performance was called a "three-octave tour de force of semi-improvisational pyrotechnics in which the jazz, pop and operatic sides of her musical personality came together and found complete expression" by The New York Times.

Singers influenced by Vaughan include Amy Winehouse, Phoebe Snow, Anita Baker, Sade, and Rickie Lee Jones. Singers Carmen McRae and Dianne Reeves both recorded tribute albums to Vaughan following her death: Sarah: Dedicated to You (1991) and The Calling: Celebrating Sarah Vaughan (2001), respectively.

Though usually considered a jazz singer, Vaughan avoided classifying herself as one. She discussed the term in a 1982 interview for Down Beat:

I don't know why people call me a jazz singer, though I guess people associate me with jazz because I was raised in it, from way back. I'm not putting jazz down, but I'm not a jazz singer ... I've recorded all kinds of music, but (to them) I'm either a jazz singer or a blues singer. I can't sing a blues – just a right-out blues – but I can put the blues in whatever I sing. I might sing 'Send In the Clowns' and I might stick a little bluesy part in it, or any song. What I want to do, music-wise, is all kinds of music that I like, and I like all kinds of music.

Vaughan mentioned Judy Garland as a major vocal influence in a 1969 interview for the Los Angeles Times: "Judy Garland was the singer I most wanted to sound like then, not to copy, but to get some of her soul and purity. A wonderful young voice."

== Personal life ==
Vaughan was married three times: to George Treadwell (1946–1958), to Clyde Atkins (1958–1961), and to Waymon Reed (1978–1981). Unable to bear children of her own, Vaughan adopted a baby girl (Debra Lois) in 1961. Debra worked in the 1980s and 1990s as an actress under the name Paris Vaughan. As a result of her daughter's marriage, Vaughan was the mother-in-law of former NHL star Russ Courtnall.

In 1977, Vaughan ended her personal and professional relationship with Marshall Fisher. Although Fisher is occasionally referenced as Vaughan's third husband, they were never legally married. Vaughan began a relationship with Waymon Reed, a trumpet player 16 years her junior who was playing with the Count Basie band. Reed joined her working trio as a musical director and trumpet player and became her third husband in 1978.

She is an honorary member of Zeta Phi Beta sorority.

== Awards and honors ==
The album Sarah Vaughan with Clifford Brown and the single "If You Could See Me Now" were inducted into the Grammy Hall of Fame, an award established in 1973 to honor recordings that are at least twenty-five years old and have "qualitative or historical significance." In 1985, she received a star on the Hollywood Walk of Fame, and in 1988 she was inducted into the American Jazz Hall of Fame.

In 1978, she was given an Honorary Doctorate of Music by Berklee College of Music. Howard University presented Vaughan with an Honorary Doctorate of Music in 1982.

In 2012, she was inducted into the New Jersey Hall of Fame. In 2004–2006, New Jersey Transit paid tribute to Vaughan in the design of its Newark Light Rail stations. Passengers stopping at any station on this line can read the lyrics to "Body and Soul" along the edge of the station platform.

She was given the George and Ira Gershwin Award for Lifetime Musical Achievement at the UCLA Spring Sing.

In 2003, San Francisco and Berkeley, California, made by proclamations March 27 Sarah Lois Vaughan Day.

=== Sarah Vaughan International Jazz Vocal Competition ===
The James Moody Jazz Festival hosts an annual jazz vocalist competition named for Vaughan. The Sarah Vaughan International Jazz Vocal Competition is also known as the SASSY Awards for Vaughan's nickname.

== Discography ==
Studio albums

- Sarah Vaughan (with George Treadwell and his All Stars) (1950)
- Sarah Vaughan (with Clifford Brown) (1955)
- In the Land of Hi-Fi (1955)
- Sassy (1956)
- Swingin' Easy (1957)
- Sarah Vaughan in a Romantic Mood (1957)
- Sarah Vaughan and Billy Eckstine Sing the Best of Irving Berlin (with Billy Eckstine) (1957)
- Sarah Vaughan Sings Broadway: Great Songs from Hit Shows (1958)
- Sarah Vaughan Sings George Gershwin (with Hal Mooney & His Orchestra) (1958)
- No Count Sarah (with Count Basie Orchestra) (1959)
- Vaughan and Violins (1959)
- The Magic of Sarah Vaughan (1959)
- Close to You (1960)
- Dreamy (1960)
- The Divine One (1960)
- My Heart Sings (1961)
- Count Basie/Sarah Vaughan (with Count Base Orchestra) (1961)
- After Hours (1961)
- You're Mine You (1962)
- Sarah + 2 (1962)
- Snowbound (1962)
- Sarah Sings Soulfully (1963)
- The Explosive Side of Sarah Vaughan (1963)
- Sarah Slightly Classical (1963)
- Star Eyes (1963)
- The Lonely Hours (1964)
- Vaughan with Voices (1964)
- Sweet 'n' Sassy (1964)
- ¡Viva! Vaughan (1965)
- Sarah Vaughan Sings the Mancini Songbook (1965)
- Pop Artistry of Sarah Vaughan (1966)
- The New Scene (1966)
- It's a Man's World (1967)
- Sassy Swings Again (1967)
- A Time in My Life (1971)
- Sarah Vaughan with Michel Legrand (with Michel Legrand) (1972)
- Feelin' Good (1972)
- Send in the Clowns (1974)
- I Love Brazil! (1977)
- How Long Has This Been Going On? (1978)
- The Duke Ellington Songbook, Vol. 1 (1979)
- The Duke Ellington Songbook, Vol. 2 (1979)
- Copacabana (1979)
- Songs of the Beatles (1981)
- Send in the Clowns (with Count Basie Orchestra) (1981)
- Crazy and Mixed Up (1982)
- The Planet Is Alive...Let It Live! (1984)
- Brazilian Romance (1987)

== Filmography ==
- Disc Jockey (1951)
- Murder, Inc. (1960)
- Schlager-Raketen (1960)
