= Sarah Vaughan albums discography =

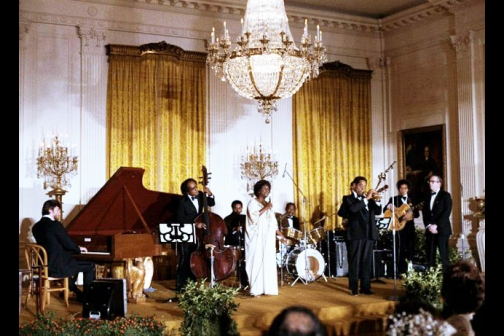
- Sarah Vaughan at the White House, 1977.
- Studio albums: 48
- Extended plays: 2
- Live albums: 10
- Compilation albums: 35
- Box sets: 5
- Other appearances: 8

The albums discography of American jazz artist Sarah Vaughan contains 48 studio albums, ten live albums, 35 compilation albums, two extended plays, five box sets and eight album appearances. Her debut studio album was issued in 1950 and was followed by her second self-titled studio recording was released on EmArcy Records in 1954. The later was a collaborative effort with Clifford Brown. Vaughan's 1958 album titled Sarah Vaughan Sings George Gershwin later would chart in the top 50 of the Billboard Traditional Jazz Albums chart. In 1959, No Count Sarah (a collaborative release with the Count Basie Orchestra) reached the top 20 of the UK Albums Chart. Vaughan recorded three live records for Mercury Records during the 1950s, beginning with 1957's At Mister Kelly's.

In the 1960s, Vaughan recorded a series of albums for Roulette Records, beginning with 1960's ballad-focused Dreamy. She and the Count Basie Orchestra released a second studio album in 1961. The decade was further highlighted by further Roulette projects, such as the Sarah Slightly Classical (1963) and Sarah Sings Soulfully (1965). She later moved back to Mercury Records and released several albums beginning with the Latin-flavored ¡Viva! Vaughan. Her final album releases for Mercury were issued in 1967. Vaughan then recorded several albums for Mainstream Records between 1971 and 1974. This included 1973's Live in Japan. Additionally, an album with Michel Legrand reached the Billboard 200 chart during this time. Vaughan then recorded for Pablo Records and released several albums through 1982, ending with Crazy and Mixed Up. Her final studio effort was 1987's Brazilian Romance. In later years, her compilation albums would reach charting Billboard positions on the Jazz charts. This included Ken Burns Jazz (2000) and Sarah for Lovers (2003).

== Studio albums ==
=== 1950s ===
List of studio albums, with selected chart positions, showing other details
Title	Album details	Peak chart positions	
Title	Album details	US Trad. Jazz	UK
Sarah Vaughan (with George Treadwell and his All Stars)	Released: 1950; Label: Columbia; Formats: LP	—	—
Sarah Vaughan (with Clifford Brown)	Released: 1954; Label: EmArcy; Formats: LP	—	—
Images	Released: 1954; Label: EmArcy; Formats: LP	—	—
In the Land of Hi-Fi	Released: 1955; Label: EmArcy; Formats: LP	—	—
Sassy	Released: 1956; Label: EmArcy; Formats: LP	—	—
Swingin' Easy	Released: 1957; Label: EmArcy; Formats: LP	—	—
Sarah Vaughan in a Romantic Mood	Released: 1957; Label: Mercury; Formats: LP	—	—
Sarah Vaughan and Billy Eckstine Sing the Best of Irving Berlin (with Billy Eckstine)	Released: 1957; Label: Mercury; Formats: LP	—	—
Sarah Vaughan Sings Broadway: Great Songs from Hit Shows	Released: 1958; Label: Mercury; Formats: LP	—	—
Sarah Vaughan Sings George Gershwin (with Hal Mooney & His Orchestra)	Released: 1958; Label: Mercury; Formats: LP	44	—
No Count Sarah (with Count Basie Orchestra)	Released: 1959; Label: Mercury; Formats: LP	—	19
Vaughan and Violins	Released: 1959; Label: Mercury; Formats: LP	—	—
The Magic of Sarah Vaughan	Released: 1959; Label: Mercury; Formats: LP	—	—
"—" denotes a recording that did not chart or was not released in that territory.

=== 1960s ===
List of studio albums, showing all relevant details
Title	Album details
Close to You	Released: 1960; Label: Mercury; Formats: LP
Dreamy	Released: April 19, 1960; Label: Roulette; Formats: LP
The Divine One	Released: December 1960; Label: Roulette; Formats: LP
My Heart Sings	Released: 1961; Label: Mercury; Formats: LP
Count Basie/Sarah Vaughan (with Count Base Orchestra)	Released: 1961; Label: Roulette; Formats: LP
Soft & Sassy Recorded in 1961	Released: 1993; Label: Hindsight Records; Formats: CD
After Hours	Released: September 1, 1961; Label: Roulette; Formats: LP
You're Mine You	Released: March 1962; Label: Roulette; Formats: LP
The Explosive Side of Sarah Vaughan	Released: 1963; Label: Roulette; Formats: LP
Sarah Sings Soulfully	Released: 1963; Label: Roulette; Formats: LP
Sarah + 2	Released: 1962; Label: Roulette; Formats: LP
Snowbound	Released: October 1962; Label: Roulette; Formats: LP
Sarah Slightly Classical	Released: 1963; Label: Roulette; Formats: LP
Star Eyes	Released: September 1963; Label: Roulette; Formats: LP
The Lonely Hours	Released: March 1964; Label: Roulette; Formats: LP
Vaughan with Voices	Released: July 1964; Label: Mercury; Formats: LP
Sweet 'n' Sassy	Released: October 1964; Label: Roulette; Formats: LP
¡Viva! Vaughan	Released: 1965; Label: Mercury; Formats: LP
Sarah Vaughan Sings the Mancini Songbook	Released: 1965; Label: Mercury; Formats: LP
Pop Artistry of Sarah Vaughan	Released: 1966; Label: Mercury; Formats: LP
The New Scene	Released: 1966; Label: Mercury; Formats: LP
It's a Man's World	Released: 1967; Label: Mercury; Formats: LP
Sassy Swings Again	Released: 1967; Label: Mercury; Formats: LP

=== 1970s ===
List of studio albums, with selected chart positions, showing other details
Title	Album details	Peak chart positions
Title	Album details	US
A Time in My Life	Released: December 1971; Label: Mainstream; Formats: LP	—
Sarah Vaughan with Michel Legrand (with Michel Legrand)	Released: 1972; Label: Mainstream; Formats: LP	173
Feelin' Good	Released: 1972; Label: Mainstream; Formats: LP	—
Send in the Clowns	Released: 1974; Label: Mainstream; Formats: LP	—
I Love Brazil!	Released: 1977; Label: Pablo; Formats: LP, cassette	—
How Long Has This Been Going On?	Released: 1978; Label: Pablo; Formats: LP, cassette	—
The Duke Ellington Songbook, Vol. 1	Released: 1979; Label: Pablo; Formats: LP, cassette	—
The Duke Ellington Songbook, Vol. 2	Released: 1979; Label: Pablo; Formats: LP, cassette	—
Copacabana	Released: 1979; Label: Pablo; Formats: LP, cassette	—
"—" denotes a recording that did not chart or was not released in that territory.

=== 1980s ===
List of studio albums, with selected chart positions, showing other details
Title	Album details	Peak chart positions
Title	Album details	US Jazz
Songs of the Beatles	Released: April 9, 1981; Label: Atlantic; Formats: LP, cassette	—
Send in the Clowns (with Count Basie Orchestra)	Released: 1981; Label: Pablo; Formats: LP, cassette	—
Crazy and Mixed Up	Released: 1982; Label: Pablo; Formats: LP, cassette	—
The Planet Is Alive...Let It Live!	Released: June 30, 1984; Label: Kokopelli; Formats: LP, cassette	—
Brazilian Romance	Released: 1987; Label: Columbia; Formats: LP, cassette, CD	4
"—" denotes a recording that did not chart or was not released in that territory.

== Compilation albums ==
=== 1950s–1980s ===
List of compilation albums, showing all relevant details
Title	Album details
Sarah Vaughan in Hi-Fi	Released: 1955; Label: Columbia; Formats: LP
After Hours	Released: 1955; Label: Columbia; Formats: LP
Sarah Vaughan's Golden Hits	Released: 1958; Label: Mercury; Formats: LP
All Time Favorites by Sarah Vaughan	Released: 1963; Label: Mercury Wing; Formats: LP
The World of Sarah Vaughan: The Divine One Sings	Released: 1964; Label: Roulette; Formats: LP
The Best of Sarah Vaughan	Released: 1983; Label: Pablo; Formats: LP, cassette, CD
Walkman Jazz: Sarah Vaughan	Released: 1987; Label: Motown Records/Verve; Formats: CD
The Complete Columbia Recordings (1949-1953)	Released: 1988; Label: Columbia/Sony; Formats: CD

=== 1990s–2010s ===
List of compilation albums, with selected chart positions, showing other details
Title	Album details	Peak chart positions	
Title	Album details	US Jazz	US Trad. Jazz
The Roulette Years: Volume One/Two	Released: January 21, 1991; Label: Roulette; Formats: CD	—	—
The Singles Sessions	Released: March 18, 1991; Label: Roulette; Formats: CD	—	—
The Essential Sarah Vaughan: The Great Songs	Released: 1992; Label: Verve; Formats: Cassette, CD	—	—
Jazz 'Round Midnight: Sarah Vaughan	Released: 1992; Label: Verve; Formats: CD	—	—
Sassy Sings and Swings	Released: 1992; Label: EMI; Formats: Cassette, CD	—	—
16 Most Requested Songs	Released: 1993; Label: Columbia/Legacy; Formats: CD	—	—
Verve Masters 18: Sarah Vaughan	Released: April 19, 1994; Label: Verve; Formats: CD	—	—
The Benny Carter Sessions	Released: 1994; Label: Blue Note/Capitol; Formats: CD	—	—
The Essence of Sarah Vaughan	Released: 1994; Label: Legacy; Formats: Cassette, CD	—	—
Favorites	Released: 1994; Label: Sony; Formats: Cassette, CD	—	—
Jazz Ladies (with Ella Fitzgerald and Carmen McRae)	Released: March 15, 1994; Label: Laserlight; Formats: CD	47	21
Jazz Masters 42: Sarah Vaughan: The Jazz Sides	Released: 1995; Label: Polygram/Verve; Formats: CD	—	—
This Is Jazz, Vol. 20	Released: September 24, 1996; Label: Columbia; Formats: CD	—	—
Ultimate Sarah Vaughan	Released: November 4, 1997; Label: Verve; Formats: CD	—	22
Four by Four (with Ella Fitzgerald, Billie Holiday and Dinah Washington)	Released: January 26, 1999; Label: Polygram/Verve; Formats: CD	—	—
Quiet Now: Dreamsville	Released: January 25, 2000; Label: Verve; Formats: CD	—	—
Sarah Vaughan's Finest Hour	Released: June 13, 2000; Label: Polygram/Verve; Formats: CD	—	—
Ken Burns Jazz: Sarah Vaughan	Released: November 7, 2000; Label: Verve; Formats: CD	12	12
The Definitive Sarah Vaughan	Released: September 24, 2002; Label: Verve; Formats: CD	—	24
Sarah For Lovers	Released: January 28, 2003; Label: Verve; Formats: CD	31	14
The Very Best of Sarah Vaughan	Released: February 18, 2003; Label: Verve; Formats: CD	—	—
Diva	Released: May 20, 2003; Label: Verve; Formats: CD	—	—
Sarah Vaughan Sings the Standards	Released: September 23, 2003; Label: EMI; Formats: CD	—	—
Love Songs	Released: December 28, 2004; Label: Legacy/Sony; Formats: CD	—	—
Beautiful	Released: April 5, 2005; Label: Sony; Formats: CD	—	—
The Genius of Sarah Vaughan	Released: April 25, 2005; Label: Verve; Formats: CD	—	—
Send in the Clowns: The Very Best of Sarah Vaughan	Released: August 1, 2006; Label: Columbia/Legacy; Formats: CD	—	—
Gold	Released: October 9, 2007; Label: Verve; Formats: CD, music download	—	—
"—" denotes a recording that did not chart or was not released in that territory.

== Live albums ==
List of live albums, with selected chart positions, showing other details
Title	Album details	Peak chart positions	
Title	Album details	US Jazz	US Trad. Jazz
At Mister Kelly's	Released: 1957; Label: Mercury; Formats: LP	—	—
After Hours at the London House	Released: 1959; Label: Mercury; Formats: LP	—	—
Sassy Swings the Tivoli	Released: 1963; Label: Mercury; Formats: LP	—	—
Live in Japan	Released: 1973; Label: Mainstream; Formats: LP, cassette	—	—
Sarah Vaughan with the Jimmy Rowles Quintet	Released: June 1975; Label: Mainstream; Formats: LP	—	—
Ronnie Scott's Presents Sarah Vaughan Live	Released: 1977; Label: Pye Records; Formats: LP	—	—
Gershwin Live! (with Michael Tilson Thomas and the Los Angeles Philharmonic)	Released: 1982; Label: Columbia; Formats: LP, cassette	—	—
In the City of Lights	Released: 1999; Label: Justin Time; Formats: CD	—	—
The Divine Lady of Song	Released: 2004; Label: Collectors' Choice Music; Formats:	—	—
Live at the 1971 Monterey Jazz Festival	Released: August 21, 2007; Label: Concord; Formats: CD, music download	50	—
Live at Rosy's	Released: March 25, 2016; Label: Resonance; Formats: CD	10	6
"—" denotes a recording that did not chart or was not released in that territory.

== Box sets ==
List of box sets, showing all relevant details
Title	Album details
The Complete Sarah Vaughan on Mercury, Vol. 1	Released: 1987; Label: Polygram; Formats: CD
The Complete Sarah Vaughan on Mercury, Vol. 2: Sings Great American Songs (1956-1957)	Released: 1987; Label: Polygram; Formats: CD
The Complete Sarah Vaughan on Mercury, Vol. 3: Great Show on Stage (1954-1956)	Released: 1986; Label: Polygram; Formats: CD
The Complete Sarah Vaughan on Mercury, Vol. 4, Pts. 1 and 2: (1963-1967)	Released: 1987; Label: Mercury; Formats: CD
Divine: The Jazz Albums: 1954-1958	Releases: March 19, 2013; Label: Verve; Formats: CD, music download

== Extended plays ==
List of extended plays, showing all relevant details
Title	Album details
Hot Jazz	Released: 1953; Label: Remington; Formats: EP
The Divine Sarah Sings	Released: 1954; Label: Mercury; Formats: EP

== Other album appearances ==
List of non-single guest appearances, with other performing artists, showing year released and album name
Title	Year	Other artist(s)	Album	Ref.
"I Know That My Redeemer Liveth"	1969	—N/a	Bob & Carol & Ted & Alice (soundtrack)	
"Lost Weekend"	1977	Godley & Creme	Consequences	
"Blue"	1984	Barry Manilow	2:00 AM Paradise Cafe	
"Bali Ha'i"	1986	—N/a	South Pacific (soundtrack)	
"Happy Talk"	1986	—N/a	South Pacific (soundtrack)	
"Wee B. Dooinit"	1989	Quincy Jones	Back on the Block	
"Jazz Corner of the World"	1989	Quincy Jones	Back on the Block	
"Birdland"	1989	Quincy Jones	Back on the Block	
"Setembro"	1989	Quincy Jones	Back on the Block	
