= Sarah Vaughan (1950 album) =

Studio album by Sarah Vaughan
- Released: 1950
- Recorded: 1949–1950
- Genre: Vocal jazz
- Label: Columbia Records

Sarah Vaughan chronology
Sarah Vaughan (1950)	Hot Jazz (EP) (1953)

Sarah Vaughan is the debut 1950 LP album of Sarah Vaughan with George Treadwell and His All Stars, 10" Columbia Records CL 6133. The instrumentalists comprised Billy Taylor Sr. bass, clarinet Tony Scott, drums J.C. Heard, guitars Freddie Green and Mundell Lowe, piano Jimmy Jones, on tenor saxophone Budd Johnson, trombone Bennie Green, and trumpet Miles Davis. The 8 songs were later incorporated into 1955's Sarah Vaughan in Hi-Fi.

== Track listing ==
1. East Of The Sun (And West Of The Moon) - Brooks Bowman
2. Nice Work If You Can Get It – George Gershwin & Ira Gershwin
3. Come Rain Or Come Shine – Harold Arlen & Johnny Mercer
4. Mean To Me – Fred E. Ahlert, Roy Turk
5. It Might As Well Be Spring – Rodgers & Hammerstein
6. Can't Get Out of This Mood – Frank Loesser, Jimmy McHugh
7. Goodnight My Love – Harry Revel, Mack Gordon
8. Ain't Misbehavin' – Andy Razaf, Baba Brooks, Walter Donaldson
