= Sarah Vaughan (disambiguation) =

Sarah Vaughan (1924–1990) was an American jazz singer.

Sarah Vaughan, or variant spellings thereof, may also refer to:

== People ==
- Sarah Vaughan (writer) (born 1972), British writer and journalist
- Sara Vaughn (athlete) (born 1986), American middle-distance runner

== Albums ==
- Sarah Vaughan (1950 album), with George Treadwell and His All Stars, for Columbia
- Sarah Vaughan (1955 album), with Clifford Brown, for EmArcy
