= Princeton Footnotes =

Princeton University a cappella group

The Princeton Footnotes
- Also known as: The Feet
- Origin: Princeton, NJ
- Genre: Collegiate a cappella
- Years active: 1959–present
- Members: Connor Odom '27; Nathan Nguyen '27; Morgan Taylor '27; Theo Kim '27; Yuri Lee '27; Sam Coleman '28; Parth Jain '28; Jared Smith '28; Liam Silverberg '28; Keahi Pelkum-Donahue '29; Sophia Self '29; Jonah Stone '29; Laura Green '29; Kenzie Schwabe '29; Nico Vanichpong-Barbosa '29; Kevin Jin '30; Kamaile Shultz '30; Henry Vidaver '30
- Website: www.princetonfootnotes.com

The Princeton Footnotes are a low-voice a cappella group from Princeton University in Princeton, New Jersey. The Footnotes are a student-run, semi-professional performance group that generally consists of ten to twenty members. The Footnotes hold auditions for first-years and sophomores twice during the school year. They are a part of Princeton University's "Acaprez" a cappella organization, which includes the Nassoons, Tigertones, Katzenjammers, Roaring Twenty, Tigerlilies, Tigressions, and Wildcats.

The Footnotes came in third in the National Collegiate A Cappella Championship Semi-Final in 2000. The group also was recognized by the Contemporary A Cappella Society through their selection of the Footnotes' rendition of "Boogie Down" for their "Best of College A Cappella Volume 1" album. They have performed for President George H. W. Bush at the White House, Lee Iacocca at Chrysler, and the New Jersey Lottery.

They appeared on Season Four of The Sing-Off.

In 2014, the Footnotes were selected for BOCA's "Best of BOCA: The First 20 Years" album for their arrangement of "Boogie Down" by Al Jarreau.

== Music ==
The Footnotes perform a wide range of musical styles, including jazz, classical, and pop. The group's repertoire is chosen and arranged by members. Though mostly constituted of cover songs, the group occasionally performs originals written by members of the group.

=== Recent Albums ===
==== The Footnotes / The Orange Album (2014) ====
Tracks:

1. I Want You Back
2. Skyfall
3. If You Could Read My Mind
4. Everything
5. I Get a Kick Out of You
6. New Shoes
7. Mirrors
8. Up the Ladder to the Roof
9. Make You Feel My Love
10. Some Nights
11. All I Ask For Is You

==== Uptown Funk [Single] (2015) ====
Tracks:

1. Uptown Funk

==== Under the Mistletoes [EP] (2015) ====
Tracks:

1. All I Want for Christmas is You
2. Deck The Halls / I'll Be Home for Christmas
3. White Christmas
4. Text Me Merry Christmas (Feat. The Princeton Tigerlilies)

==== Considerous Deliberation (2017) ====
Tracks:

1. Seven Nation Army
2. Ignition (Remix)
3. Shangri-La
4. Honeymoon Avenue
5. Colder Weather
6. New York, New York
7. Love Yourself
8. Survivor
9. When Daybreak Comes
10. 7 Years
11. Pusher Love Girl
12. All I Ask For Is You

==== It's Always Like This (2019) ====
Tracks:

1. Crazy
2. Attention
3. Castle on the Hill
4. Homeward Bound
5. Who Loves You / December, 1963
6. Royals
7. Seven Bridges Road
8. Valerie
9. Moonshine Lullaby
10. Stitches
11. Waving Through a Window
12. I Knew You Were Trouble
13. All I Ask for Is You
14. Boogie Down

==== 12 Feet Apart [EP] (2021) ====
Tracks:

1. Seven Nation Army
2. I Want You Back
3. Unforgettable
4. Pusher Love Girl
5. Yesterday
6. Kiss Him Goodbye

==== Under Renovation (2025) ====
Tracks:

1. Dancing In The Moonlight
2. Heavenly Bodies
3. Julius
4. Sway
5. Late Night Talking
6. It's Alright
7. When Daybreak Comes
8. Heartache Tonight
9. Everything
10. Little Bitty Pretty One
11. Black Water
12. All I Ask For Is You

== Tours and Performances ==
As part of Princeton University's "Acaprez" a cappella organization, the Footnotes usually perform every other week at Arch Sings with other member groups.

In addition to on-campus performances, the Footnotes traditionally go on two performance tours each year. Recent tours have included visits to Hawaii (2026), Belgium (2025), Washington, D.C. (2024), Switzerland (2024), Massachusetts (2023), Spain (2023), California (2022), and The United Kingdom (2020).

== Notable alumni ==
- Joel Rosenman
- Edward Thomas Ryan
- George T. Whitesides
