= The Divine Sarah Sings =

EP by Sarah Vaughan
- Released: 1954
- Recorded: October–December 1954
- Genre: Vocal jazz
- Length: 54:43
- Label: Mercury

Sarah Vaughan chronology
Hot Jazz (1953)	The Divine Sarah Sings (1954)	Sarah Vaughan (1955 album) (1955)

The Divine Sarah Sings is a 1954 EP album by Sarah Vaughan, accompanied by the Hugo Peretti Orchestra.

== Reception ==
Professional ratings
Review scores
Source	Rating
Allmusic	3/5 stars

The Allmusic review by Richard S. Ginell awarded the album three stars and said that "This now-rare ten-inch LP is a quintessential artifact of the 1950s; easy listening in gleaming hi-fi for the white suburbs. Miss Sassy does her job supremely well, even making stoic work of the cuter-than-words treatment of "Honey," and occasionally she gets a chance to show off her uniquely wide-screen range, turning in an especially lovely "Tenderly" with some virtuosic glides".

== Track listing ==
1. "The Touch of Your Lips" (Ray Noble)
2. "'S Wonderful" (George Gershwin, Ira Gershwin)
3. "Tenderly" (Jack Lawrence, Walter Gross)
4. "It's Magic" (Sammy Cahn, Jule Styne)
5. “Honey” (Gillespie, Whiting, Simons)
6. “Let's Put Out the Lights” (Herman Hupfeld)
7. “I'm in the Mood for Love” (McHugh-Fields)
8. “I Don't Know Why” (Fred E. Ahlert, Roy Turk)

== Personnel ==
- Sarah Vaughan - vocals
- The Hugo Peretti Orchestra
