= Sarah Vaughan in Hi-Fi =

Compilation album by Sarah Vaughan
- Released: 1955
- Recorded: December 1949 – December 1952
- Genre: Vocal jazz, traditional pop
- Length: 64:12
- Label: Columbia CL 745 /Legacy
- Producer: Phil Schaap, Rene Arsenault (executive producer)

Sarah Vaughan chronology
My Kinda Love (1955)	Sarah Vaughan in Hi-Fi (1955)	After Hours (1955)

Professional ratings
Review scores
Source	Rating
AllMusic	4/5 stars

Sarah Vaughan in Hi-Fi is a 12 track compilation album by Sarah Vaughan released in 1955 and recorded from December 21, 1949 to December 1952.

== History ==
In 1950, a debut 10" LP entitled Sarah Vaughan was released with eight songs that would later be used on Sarah Vaughan in Hi-Fi.

In 1955, those eight songs, along with four others, were released on the 12" LP Sarah Vaughan in Hi-Fi. The order of the original eight songs was changed and the new songs were interspersed.

In 1996, an expanded version of Sarah Vaughan in Hi-Fi was released on CD. The order of the original eight songs was switched back to that of the 1950 10" release. The four additional songs released on Sarah Vaughan in Hi-Fi then follow. After that, the CD contains bonus material - alternate versions of many of the songs.

== Track listings ==
=== 1950 10" LP ===
1. "East of the Sun (and West of the Moon)" (Brooks Bowman) – 3:06
2. "Nice Work If You Can Get It" (George Gershwin, Ira Gershwin) – 2:35
3. "Come Rain or Come Shine" (Harold Arlen, Johnny Mercer) – 3:23
4. "Mean to Me" (Fred E. Ahlert, Roy Turk) – 2:53
5. "It Might as Well Be Spring" (Oscar Hammerstein II, Richard Rodgers) – 3:11
6. "Can't Get Out of This Mood" (Frank Loesser, Jimmy McHugh) – 2:49
7. "Goodnight My Love" (Mack Gordon, Harry Revel) – 3:37
8. "Ain't Misbehavin'" (Harry Brooks, Andy Razaf, Fats Waller) – 2:59

=== 1955 12" LP ===
1. "East of the Sun (and West of the Moon)" (Brooks Bowman) – 3:06
2. "Nice Work If You Can Get It" (George Gershwin, Ira Gershwin) – 2:35
3. "Pinky" (Loesser, Alfred Newman) – 2:41
4. "The Nearness of You" (Hoagy Carmichael, Ned Washington) – 3:19
5. "Come Rain or Come Shine" (Harold Arlen, Johnny Mercer) – 3:23
6. "Mean to Me" – 2:49 [alternate version - not the same version that was on the 1950 LP]
7. "It Might as Well Be Spring" (Oscar Hammerstein II, Richard Rodgers) – 3:11
8. "Can't Get Out of This Mood" (Frank Loesser, Jimmy McHugh) – 2:49
9. "Spring Will Be a Little Late This Year" (Gordon, Loesser, Revel) – 2:40
10. "Ooh, What 'Cha Doin' to Me" (Al Fields, Timmie Rogers) – 1:54
11. "Goodnight My Love" (Mack Gordon, Harry Revel) – 3:37
12. "Ain't Misbehavin'" (Harry Brooks, Andy Razaf, Fats Waller) – 2:59

=== 1996 CD ===
1. "East of the Sun (and West of the Moon)" (Brooks Bowman) – 3:06
2. "Nice Work If You Can Get It" (George Gershwin, Ira Gershwin) – 2:35
3. "Come Rain or Come Shine" (Harold Arlen, Johnny Mercer) – 3:23
4. "Mean to Me" (Fred E. Ahlert, Roy Turk) – 2:53
5. "It Might as Well Be Spring" (Oscar Hammerstein II, Richard Rodgers) – 3:11
6. "Can't Get Out of This Mood" (Frank Loesser, Jimmy McHugh) – 2:49
7. "Goodnight My Love" (Mack Gordon, Harry Revel) – 3:37
8. "Ain't Misbehavin'" (Harry Brooks, Andy Razaf, Fats Waller) – 2:59
9. "Pinky" (Loesser, Alfred Newman) – 2:41
10. "The Nearness of You" (Hoagy Carmichael, Ned Washington) – 3:19
11. "Spring Will Be a Little Late This Year" (Gordon, Loesser, Revel) – 2:40
12. "Ooh, What 'Cha Doin' to Me" (Alvin Fields, Theodis Rogers) – 1:54
13. "It's All in the Mind" (Doris Fisher, Allan Roberts) – 3:21 [previously unreleased]
14. "The Nearness of You" – 3:09 [previously unreleased - Alternate Take]
15. "Ain't Misbehavin'" – 2:59 [previously unreleased - Alternate Take]
16. "Goodnight My Love" – 3:44 [previously unreleased - Alternate Take]
17. "Can't Get Out of This Mood" – 2:50 [previously unreleased - Alternate Take]
18. "It Might as Well Be Spring" – 3:26 [previously unreleased - Alternate Take]
19. "Mean to Me" – 2:49 [version from 1950 10" LP]
20. "Come Rain or Come Shine" – 3:32 [previously unreleased - Alternate Take]
21. "East of the Sun (and West of the Moon)" – 3:09 [previously unreleased - Alternate Take]

== Personnel ==
=== Musicians ===
(per the 1996 CD reissue; no credits were given for tracks 9, 11, and 12; for track 13, it noted: "Large unidentified studio orchestra." and gave "possible personnel")

- Jimmy Abato – saxophonist, woodwind player, possible on 13
- David Asch – violinist (not on the 1996 CD reissue)
- Russ Bazer – saxophonist, woodwind player, possible on 13
- Will Bradley – trombonist, 10, 14, possible on 13
- Sidney Brecher – violist, possible on 13
- Billy Butterfield – trumpeter, 10, 14
- Al Caiola – guitarist, 10, 14
- Frank Carroll – bassist, possible on 13
- Peter Cincillo – trumpeter, possible on 13
- Cozy (William) Coles – drummer, 10, 14
- A. Cores – violinist (not on the 1996 CD reissue)
- Miles Davis – trumpeter, 1-8, 15-21
- Richard Dickler – violinist (not on the 1996 CD reissue)
- Artie Drelinger – tenor saxophonist, 10,14
- Harold Feldman – saxophonist, woodwind player, possible on 13
- Stan Freeman – pianist (not on 1996 CD reissue)
- Al Freistadt – woodwind player (not on 1996 CD reissue)
- A. Godis – trombonist (a "Al G." is listed as a possible trombonist on 13)
- Bennie Green – trombonist, 1-8, 15-21
- Freddie Green – guitarist (not on the 1996 CD reissue)
- Greene – violinist (not on the 1996 CD reissue)
- J.C. Heard – drummer, 1-8, 15-21
- Budd Johnson – tenor saxophonist, 1-8, 15-21
- Jimmy Jones – pianist, 1-8, 10, 14-21
- Taft Jordan – trumpeter, 10, 14
- Bernie (Bernard) Kaufman – saxophonist, possible on 13
- George Kelly – tenor saxophonist, 10, 14
- Milton Lomask – violinist (not on 1996 CD reissue)
- Mundell Lowe – electric guitarist, 1-8, 15-21
- Jimmy Maxwell – trumpeter, possible on 13
- J. Milazzo – trumpeter, possible on 13
- Toots (Nunzio) Mondello – alto saxophonist, woodwind player, 10, 14
- George Ockner – violinist (not on the 1996 CD reissue)
- Adam Pratz – violinist (not on the 1996 CD reissue)
- Art Ryerson – guitarist, possible on 13
- Eddie Safranski – bassist, 10, 14
- Jack Satterfield – trombonist, possible on 13
- Julius Schachter – violinist (not on the 1996 CD reissue)
- Hymie (Herman) Schertzer – alto saxophonist, 10, 14
- Tony Scott – clarinetist, 1-8, 15-21
- Terry Snyder – drummer, possible on 13
- Melvin "Red" Solomon – trumpeter, possible on 13
- Lou Stein – pianist, possible on 13
- Billy Taylor Jr. – bassist, 1-8, 15-21
- Sarah Vaughan – vocals, all tracks
- William (Bill) Vercasi – saxophonist, possible on 13
- Stanley Webb – baritone saxophonist, 10, 14

=== Production ===
- Fred E. Ahlert – composer
- Rene Arsenault – assistant producer
- Brooks Bowman – composer
- Matt Cavaluzzo – mastering
- Percy Faith – arranger, conductor
- Alvin Fields – composer
- Mack Gordon – composer
- Dick Katz – liner notes
- Joe Lipman – arranger, conductor
- Frank Loesser – composer
- Randall Martin – designer
- Jimmy McHugh – composer
- Alfred Newman – composer
- Arthur Newman – composer
- Michael Ochs – photography
- Debra Parkinson – mastering
- Theodis Rodgers – composer
- Seth Rothstein – project director
- Harry Revel – composer
- Cozbi Sanchez-Cabrera – art director
- Phil Schaap – liner notes, remastering
- Roy Turk – composer

== Recording dates ==
(per the 1996 CD reissue)

- December 21, 1949: 10, 14
- May 18, 1950: 5-8, 15-18
- May 19, 1950: 1-4, 19-21
- September 19, 1951: 9
- December 30, 1952: 13
- January 5, 1953: 11-12
