= Princeton Katzenjammers =

Princeton University a cappella group

The Princeton Katzenjammers
- Also known as: The KJs
- Origin: Princeton, NJ
- Genres: Collegiate a cappella
- Years active: 1973–present
- Website: www.theprincetonkatzenjammers.com

The Princeton Katzenjammers are the oldest co-educational collegiate a cappella group in the Ivy League. The group consists of fourteen to eighteen Princeton University students and holds auditions at the beginning of each semester. Its repertoire includes a wide variety of musical styles, with an emphasis on jazz, pop, and classical.

Their fifth album, "Midnight Comes Around" (1995), earned the group nominations in all Mixed Collegiate categories of the 1996 Contemporary A Cappella Recording Awards, winning the Best Arrangement award for Rick Hoffenberg '94's arrangement of Thelonious Monk's jazz standard "'Round Midnight," which was also selected for the "Best of College A Cappella" collection in 1996. CASA declared it "one of the finest vocal jazz tracks ever recorded by a collegiate group."

== About the group ==
The group was founded by Peter Urquhart '74, a member of the Princeton Nassoons, and Mimi Danley '74, a member of the Princeton Tigerlilies, in 1973, the same year that undergraduate women first graduated from Princeton. The Katzenjammers joined four other Princeton a cappella singing groups in existence at the time: the Nassoons, Tigertones, Footnotes, and the Tigerlilies. These groups, along with the Tigressions, the Wildcats, and the Roaring Twenty, form Acaprez, an organization of eight Princeton University a cappella groups that organize arch sings and abide by regulations regarding the audition process and song ownership. The Katzenjammers have performed at numerous events on Princeton’s campus, in the surrounding community, across the United States and abroad. They participate in charitable events such as the 2014 "Sing Out for Shelter" benefit concert in Washington DC.

=== Origin of the name ===
Peter Urquhart recalls, "Somehow the name Katzenjammer came up, was overlooked briefly, and then considered again. I looked it up in the OED, and got excited about the confusion of meanings: 1. distress, depression; 2. a hangover, or symptoms of one; 3. a discordant clamor; 4. enfants terribles, as in the Katzenjammer Kids from the cartoon strip. Images of wailing, drinking, trouble-making, cats, jamming, Katz: a little degenerate maybe, but otherwise perfect. That was it!"

== Music ==
The Katzenjammer repertoire spans a wide range of genres, including jazz, classical, secular, sacred, folk, and pop music, with over one hundred arrangements in the complete repertoire. Undergraduate members and alumni alike continue to contribute new arrangements at a regular pace. Two of Peter Urquhart's first arrangements written specifically for the Katzenjammers, "Ticket to Ride" and "Stoned Soul Picnic", remain traditional favorites and are always featured at reunions of Katzenjammer alumni.

== Discography ==
- Take One, 1977 (LP)
- Double Take, 1984 (LP)
- Time after Time, 1989 (CD, Cassette)
- Sense and Muses, 1992 (CD, Cassette)
- Midnight Comes Around, 1995 (CD, Cassette) — On Broadway
- XXV: Twenty-Five Years of Coed A Cappella (25th Anniversary Compilation), 1998 (CD)
- Traffic Jam, 1998 (CD) — Route 66 • I Caught a Touch of Your Love
- Autumn Leaves, 2001 (CD) — Autumn Leaves • Misty • In the Mood • A Red, Red Rose • Do the Walls Come Down? • A Foggy Day
- Sassafras & Moonshine, 2004 (CD) — Stoned Soul Picnic • To Make You Feel My Love • You're No Good • In the Mood • Have Yourself a Merry Little Christmas • O Magnum Mysterium
- Scratching Out a Tune, 2008 (CD) — Gospel Tropes • Sometimes I Feel Like a Motherless Child • 'Round Midnight
- I Want It To Be, 2011 (Single)
- Thoughts of Reminiscing, 2013 (CD)
- Wonderland, 2016 (CD)
- Evolution: The Katz at 50, 2023 (CD)

== Recent Tours ==
The Katzenjammers tour both domestically and internationally, usually during Princeton's fall and spring breaks, and occasionally during Intersession in January, between the winter break and first semester examinations.

- Fall 2019: Vancouver
- Fall 2018: San Francisco
- Fall 2017: Boston
- Fall 2016: Montreal
- Fall 2015: Birmingham, Alabama
- Fall 2014: New Orleans
- Spring 2013: Los Angeles
- Fall 2012: Sarasota, FL
- Fall 2011: Florida
- Intersession 2010: San Francisco, CA
- Fall 2008: Paris
- Spring 2008: Chicago, IL
- Fall 2007: Calgary
- Spring 2007: Georgia
- Fall 2006: Ireland
- Fall 2005: Los Angeles
- Spring 2005: London
- Fall 2004: Seattle
- Intersession 2004: Guatemala
- Spring 2001: Paris

== Notable alumni ==
- Todd Purdum '82: national editor and political correspondent for Vanity Fair magazine
- Valerie Vigoda '87: composer and member of musical group GrooveLily
- Zachary Knower '88: actor
- Ryan Brandau '03: choral composer, arranger, director, and professional singer
- Geoff McDonald '07: cello player in the band Miracles of Modern Science
- Evan Younger '08: double bass player and vocalist in the band Miracles of Modern Science
- Kim Riether Coupounas '89, founder of GoLite, outdoor industry entrepreneur, global sustainable business leader
- G. Scott Clemons '90, Chief Investment Strategist at Brown Brothers Harriman & Co.
- Ben Taub '14: contestant in Season 3 of The Voice

Brooke Shields '87 auditioned for The Katzenjammers in the fall of 1983, but either declined a callback or was rejected.

== Awards ==
Year	Presenter	Category	Nomination	Result
1996	Contemporary A Cappella Recording Awards of CASA	Mixed Collegiate Best Album	"Midnight Comes Around"	Runner up
1996	Contemporary A Cappella Recording Awards of CASA	Mixed Collegiate Best Song	"'Round Midnight"	Runner up
1996	Contemporary A Cappella Recording Awards of CASA	Mixed Collegiate Best Arrangement	"'Round Midnight"	Winner
1996	Contemporary A Cappella Recording Awards of CASA	Mixed Collegiate Best Soloist	Michelle Smith '96, "Do The Walls Come Down"	Runner up
