= My Heart Sings =

My Heart Sings may refer to:

- My Heart Sings (film), a 1951 Italian comedy film
- My Heart Sings (Tony Bennett album), 1961
- My Heart Sings (Sarah Vaughan album), 1961
