= Hot jazz =

Hot jazz may refer to:

- Dixieland jazz
- Hot Jazz (album), an album by Sarah Vaughan
