= Standard Time, Vol. 2: Intimacy Calling =

Studio album by Wynton Marsalis
- Released: 1990
- Recorded: September, 1987; August, 1990
- Genre: Jazz
- Length: 69:55
- Label: Columbia
- Producer: George Butler

Wynton Marsalis chronology
Haydn: Three Favorite Concertos (1990)	Standard Time, Vol. 2: Intimacy Calling (1990)	Standard Time, Vol. 3: The Resolution of Romance (1990)

Standard Time, Vol. 2: Intimacy Calling is an album by jazz trumpeter Wynton Marsalis that was released in 1990. The album reached peak positions of number 112 on the Billboard 200 and number 1 on the Billboard Top Jazz Albums chart.

== Reception ==
Professional ratings
Review scores
Source	Rating
AllMusic	4/5 stars
The Penguin Guide to Jazz Recordings	3/4 stars

In a review for AllMusic, Scott Yanow wrote: "On most of the selections, the brilliant trumpeter is heard in excellent form... Marsalis's tone really makes the ballads worth hearing, and his unusual choice and placement of notes keeps the music stimulating."

The authors of The Penguin Guide to Jazz Recordings called the album "the less effective of the two later Standard Times, and noted that, although "Marsalis has always shown tremendous loyalty and respect to his sidemen," "the extra horns bring nothing of any great substance," while Marcus Roberts "seems to have difficulty making his presence felt."

Jack Fuller of the Chicago Tribune stated: "the trumpet wonder extends the new melodic reach he has attained through the study of figures like Louis Armstrong. His lyricism is always accomplished and at times quite lovely. Now what he needs is to heed the call of intimacy and let a little of the passion out, even at the expense of perfection and earnestness."

Writing for Burning Ambulance, Phil Freeman commented: "Its subtitle might suggest an album of Quiet Storm-ish ballads, and the first and last tracks... nod to New Orleans, but for most of its running time Intimacy Calling is a hard-swinging hard bop record, particularly indebted to the work of the Clifford Brown-Max Roach Quintet."

== Track listing ==
1. "When It's Sleepytime Down South" (Clarence Muse, Leon René, Otis René) – 5:10
2. "You Don't Know What Love Is" (Gene de Paul, Don Raye) – 6:23
3. "Indelible and Nocturnal" (Wynton Marsalis) – 4:11
4. "I'll Remember April" (Gene de Paul, Patricia Johnston, Don Raye) – 8:34
5. "Embraceable You" (Ira Gershwin, George Gershwin) – 7:16
6. "Crepuscule with Nellie" (Thelonious Monk) – 3:04
7. "What Is This Thing Called Love?" (Cole Porter) – 6:29
8. "The End of a Love Affair" (Edward C. Redding) – 3:13
9. "East of the Sun (West of the Moon)" (Brooks Bowman) – 5:16
10. "Lover" (Lorenz Hart, Richard Rodgers) – 5:06
11. "Yesterdays" (Otto Harbach, Jerome Kern) – 9:36
12. "Bourbon Street Parade" (Paul Barbarin) – 5:48

== Personnel ==
- Wynton Marsalis – trumpet
- Wessell Anderson – alto saxophone
- Todd Williams – tenor saxophone
- Marcus Roberts – piano
- Robert Hurst – double bass
- Reginald Veal – double bass
- Jeff "Tain" Watts – drums
- Herlin Riley – drums
- George Butler – executive producer
- Stanley Crouch – liner notes
