= Sassy Swings the Tivoli =

Live album by Sarah Vaughan
- Released: 1963
- Recorded: July 18–21, 1963
- Genre: Vocal jazz
- Length: 118:50
- Label: Mercury
- Producer: Quincy Jones

Sarah Vaughan chronology
Sarah Slightly Classical (1963)	Sassy Swings the Tivoli (1963)	Snowbound (1963)

Professional ratings
Review scores
Source	Rating
Allmusic	4.5/5 stars
The Rolling Stone Jazz Record Guide	4/5 stars
The Penguin Guide to Jazz Recordings	3.5/4 stars

Sassy Swings the Tivoli is a 1963 live album by American jazz singer Sarah Vaughan and her trio, produced by Quincy Jones. The performances were recorded in the concert hall of the Tivoli Gardens, Copenhagen, over four days in July 1963.

== Reception ==
The initial Billboard review from October 12, 1963 commented that Vaughan was "really swinging on this album", and described it as a "must for Sassy's fans" with "radiation on both sides of the footlights".

Scott Yanow on AllMusic gave the album four and a half stars out of five and commented that the album was a "gem" and that this "wonderful live session" was "one of her very best of the 1960s".

== Track listing ==
Disc one
No.	Title	Writer(s)	Length
1.	"I Feel Pretty"	Leonard Bernstein, Stephen Sondheim	2:34
2.	"Misty"	Erroll Garner, Johnny Burke	5:56
3.	"What Is This Thing Called Love?"	Cole Porter	2:04
4.	"Lover Man (Oh, Where Can You Be?)"	Jimmy Davis, Ram Ramirez, Jimmy Sherman	5:56
5.	"Sometimes I'm Happy"	Irving Caesar, Clifford Grey, Vincent Youmans	4:30
6.	"Won't You Come Home, Bill Bailey?"	Hughie Cannon	3:14
7.	"Tenderly"	Walter Gross, Jack Lawrence	2:33
8.	"Sassy's Blues"	Quincy Jones, Sarah Vaughan	5:40
9.	"Polka Dots and Moonbeams"	Jimmy Van Heusen, Johnny Burke	4:27
10.	"I Cried for You"	Gus Arnheim, Arthur Freed, Abe Lyman	2:20
11.	"Poor Butterfly"	Raymond Hubbell, John Golden	3:12
12.	"I Could Write a Book"	Richard Rodgers, Lorenz Hart	2:21
13.	"Time After Time"	Jule Styne, Sammy Cahn	4:56
14.	"All of Me"	Gerald Marks, Seymour Simons	1:43
15.	"I Hadn't Anyone Till You"	Ray Noble	3:17
16.	"I Can't Give You Anything But Love"	Jimmy McHugh, Dorothy Fields	2:46
Total length:			57:29

Disc two
No.	Title	Writer(s)	Length
1.	"I'll Be Seeing You"	Sammy Fain, Irving Kahal	5:32
2.	"Maria"	Leonard Bernstein, Stephen Sondheim	5:51
3.	"Day In, Day Out"	Rube Bloom, Johnny Mercer	2:15
4.	"Fly Me to the Moon"	Bart Howard	4:39
5.	"Baubles, Bangles and Beads"	George Forrest, Robert C. Wright	3:07
6.	"The Lady's in Love with You"	Burton Lane, Frank Loesser	2:15
7.	"Honeysuckle Rose"	Fats Waller, Andy Razaf	3:14
8.	"What Is This Thing Called Love?"	Cole Porter	2:01
9.	"Lover Man (Oh, Where Can You Be?)"	Jimmy Davis, Ram Ramirez, Jimmy Sherman	4:06
10.	"I Cried for You"	Gus Arnheim, Abe Lyman, Arthur Freed	2:19
11.	"The More I See You"	Mack Gordon, Harry Warren	5:26
12.	"Say It Isn't So"	Irving Berlin	5:11
13.	"Black Coffee"	Sonny Burke, Paul Francis Webster	4:40
14.	"Just One of Those Things"	Cole Porter	2:33
15.	"On Green Dolphin Street"	Bronisław Kaper, Ned Washington	3:04
16.	"Over the Rainbow"	Harold Arlen, Yip Harburg	5:10
Total length:			61:23

== Personnel ==
- Sarah Vaughan – vocals
- Kirk Stuart – piano, vocals on "Misty" (disc 1, track 2)
- Charles Williams – double bass
- George Hughes – drums
- Quincy Jones – producer
