= Kirk Stuart =

American jazz pianist and educator

- Born: Charles Kincheloe Stuart; April 13, 1934; Charleston, West Virginia, U.S.
- Died: December 17, 1982 (aged 48) United States
- Genres: Jazz
- Occupations: Musician, educator
- Instrument: Piano
- Years active: 1950s–1982

Charles Kincheloe "Kirk" Stuart (April 13, 1934 – December 17, 1982) was an American jazz pianist, arranger, conductor, and educator.

== Career ==
Stuart received formal musical training at a conservatory before beginning his professional career in the mid-1950s. He gained recognition as a skilled accompanist, working with legendary vocalists such as Billie Holiday (1956), Della Reese (1957–1959), and Sarah Vaughan (1961–1963), for whom he also served as arranger and conductor.

In the latter half of the 1960s, Stuart led his own ensembles in Los Angeles and recorded with trombonist Al Grey in 1965. He later reunited with Della Reese for a 1967 recording session.

Stuart transitioned into education during the 1970s, teaching at institutions including Howard University and directing the Texas Southern University Jazz Ensemble. He continued performing, leading groups in Las Vegas and accompanying jazz vocalist Joe Williams in a 1982 performance at the Smithsonian Institution.

Later that year, Stuart died during surgery on his spleen at the age of 48.

== Discography ==
=== With Al Grey ===
- Shades of Grey (Tangerine, 1965)

=== With Sarah Vaughan ===
- Sassy Swings The Tivoli (1963)
