= Mean to Me (1929 song) =

1929 popular song

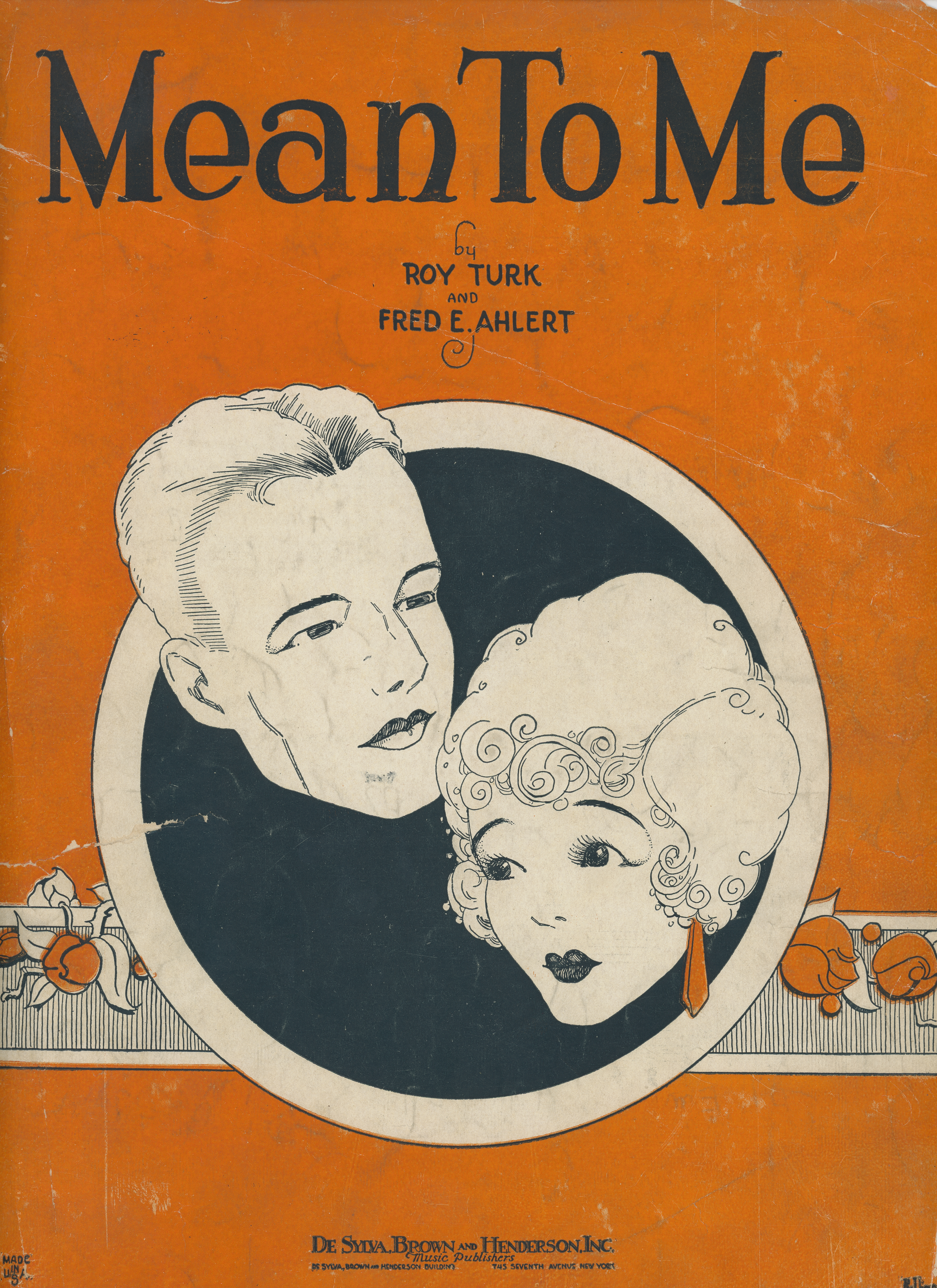
Sheet music cover, 1929

"Mean to Me"
1929 recording featuring Annette Hanshaw

"Mean to Me" is a popular song with music by Fred E. Ahlert and lyrics by Roy Turk, published in 1929. Hit versions that year were by Ruth Etting and by Helen Morgan. Ben Bernie and the Hotel Roosevelt Orchestra also recorded what might be the first male version in February 1929 with vocals by Scrappy Albert.

The song is a popular standard, recorded by many artists.

== Other notable recordings ==
- Annette Hanshaw - recorded in New York February 20, 1929. Released under the pseudonym of Gay Ellis and Her Orchestra on Harmony 859H.
- Ben Bernie and His Hotel Roosevelt Orchestra with Scrappy Lambert on vocals - recorded in February 1929.
- Billie Holiday recorded her version in 1937 with Lester Young and Teddy Wilson and this was very popular that year.
- Una Mae Carlisle and her Jam Band - recorded May 20, 1938 in London, Vocalion S-198 (UK).
- The Andrews Sisters - recorded September 5, 1940 for Decca Records (catalog No. 3440A).
- In 1946, Lester Young, Nat King Cole and Buddy Rich recorded the song, which was released on the album The Lester Young Trio No. 2.
- Frank Sinatra recorded the song on October 31, 1947, for Columbia Records.
- Benny Goodman recorded for Capitol Records H441 The Goodman Touch with Jimmy Rowles, piano (1947)
- Sarah Vaughan recorded the song for her EP Hot Jazz (1953) and album Sarah Vaughan in Hi-Fi (1955)
- Doris Day recorded a version for the 1955 film Love Me or Leave Me.
- Julie London recorded the song for her album Lonely Girl (1956).
- Judy Garland - for her album Alone (1957)
- The Platters - The Flying Platters (1957).
- Debbie Reynolds - for her album Debbie (1959).
- Dean Martin recorded the song in 1960 with Nelson Riddle and his orchestra for the album This Time I'm Swingin'!.
- Rosemary Clooney recorded the song for her albums Clap Hands! Here Comes Rosie! (1960), Here's to My Lady (1978) and Dedicated to Nelson (1995).
- Betty Carter recorded the song in August 1960, released on her album The Modern Sound of Betty Carter.
- Margaret Whiting - Past Midnight (1961).
- Ella Fitzgerald included the song on her 1962 Verve release Ella Swings Brightly with Nelson, recorded with the Nelson Riddle Orchestra; she won the Grammy Award for Best Female Pop Vocal Performance for her work on the album. Fitzgerald recorded a new version in 1975, together with pianist Oscar Peterson on the album Ella and Oscar (Pablo Records).
- Robert Goulet - The Wonderful World of Love (1963).
- Chet Baker included the song on his album Baker's Holiday (1965). Carol Channing for her album Carol Channing Entertains (1965)
- Jack Jones - for his album Without Her (1967).
- Anita O'Day recorded the song for her album My Ship (1975).
- Linda Ronstadt recorded the song with Nelson Riddle for her album Lush Life (1984).
- Vic Damone - Music of Your Life: Love Songs (Reader's Digest Label Recordings) (2004)
- New Orleans Jazz Vipers have also recorded the song (2005).

== In popular culture ==
An instrumental of the song was heard in the first Krazy Kat sound cartoon from 1929, Ratskin.

A brief violin instrumental version is heard in the 1932 Betty Boop cartoon Minnie the Moocher.

The original recording by Annette Hanshaw is used in the 2008 animated film Sita Sings the Blues. In the 1929 film, "Charming Sinners", Mary Nolan sings the song's title and hums the rest of the song several times to her lover.

== See also ==
- List of 1920s jazz standards
