= Princeton Nassoons =

Princeton University a cappella group

The Princeton Nassoons
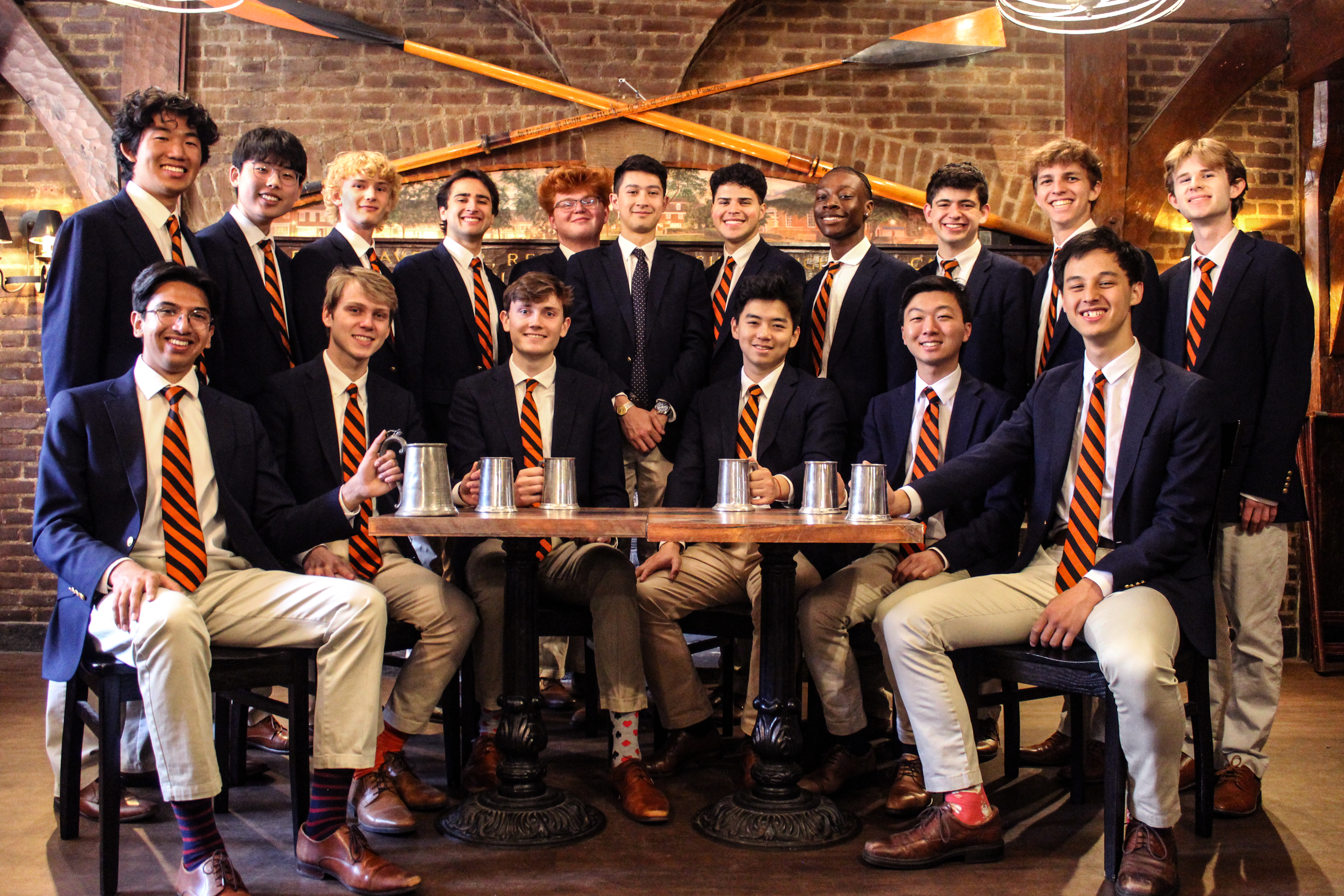

Background information
- Also known as: The 'Soons
- Origin: Princeton, New Jersey
- Genre: A cappella
- Years active: 1941–present
- Members: Tenor I Joey Roth '28; Liam Darnell '29; Tenor II; Arturo Cruz Urrutia '27; David Getz '28; Tenor-Baritone; Jake Miller '28; Minsung Kim '29; Baritone; Matt Cline '27; Jordan Chi '28; Lukas Palys '29; Bass; Kweku Akese '28; Miguel Palacios '28 President; Matt Cline Music Director; Arturo Cruz Urrutia
- Website: www.nassoons.com

The Princeton Nassoons, also known as the 'Soons, are a ten to twenty-member low-voice a cappella group at Princeton University. The group has been officially self-selecting (and self-directing) since 1941, although the original group is known to have sung together as early as 1939. The Nassoons are the oldest a cappella group at Princeton University, and they are also the oldest continuously all-male collegiate a cappella group in the United States.

The Nassoons have performed at a number of prominent venues, including the White House, the US Open, and have also appeared on The Early Show, and Good Morning America. Additionally, they have performed for various heads of state, such as Queen Noor of Jordan and the royal family of Liechtenstein. They also appeared in Admission (2013 film) starring Tina Fey and Paul Rudd. In 2024, the Nassoons held a private performance for GRAMMY award-winning singer-songwriter Laufey.

== Name ==
Nassoons founding member Charles Kennedy ’42 recalled proposing "Nassoons" during an informal discussion among the original members in 1942. From a window overlooking Princeton's FitzRandolph Gate, portions of the street signs for Nassau Street and Witherspoon Street appeared to overlap, visually combining "Nass" and "-oon". Other members later described the name as a combination of "Nassau" and "tunes", or as a wordplay involving Nassau Hall and the bassoon.

== History ==
=== Founding and early years, 1941–1948 ===
The Nassoons were formed in 1941 by eight members of the Princeton University Glee Club who sought to establish a small-group a cappella ensemble at Princeton. The group first attracted significant attention during that year's Princeton–Yale Glee Club concert, where it performed an arrangement of Perfidia. The song was repeated as an encore and later became a traditional closing song and alumni anthem of the group.

During the early 1940s, the Nassoons expanded their activities beyond campus, performing at colleges, preparatory schools, hotels, clubs, and military camps. The group appeared at venues including New York's Rainbow Room and, within a year of its debut, sang in the presence of Ella Fitzgerald. It also performed music associated with bandleader Lester Lanin and recorded with actress and singer Gertrude Lawrence. Although the group remained affiliated with the Glee Club during its first years, it increasingly developed an independent performance schedule and repertoire.

The Nassoons also appeared in the Princeton Triangle Club's 1942 production of Time and Again, performing during scene changes and in several musical numbers. In May 1943, the group presented a twenty-one-song concert at Blair Arch, an early example of the outdoor singing performances that later became a feature of Princeton campus life.

The group disbanded in 1943 as Princeton students left campus during World War II. Before suspending its activities, the Nassoons released recordings and adopted a constitution providing that the group's name could not be revived without the participation of returning alumni, who would audition and select a new membership.

Nassoon alumni returned to Princeton in May 1946 and revived the group after a three-year hiatus. In September of that year, Princeton's Committee on Non-Athletic Organizations granted the Nassoons a charter as an independent student organization. The reconstituted group participated in the Triangle Club's first postwar production, Clear the Track, and made its campus debut with the Glee Club at Alexander Hall in November 1946. It also performed that evening at a Daily Princetonian dance with Les Brown and his orchestra.

In 1947, the Nassoons released their first recording since the wartime hiatus and resumed joint appearances with the Whiffenpoofs. That year, members of the two groups also began a touch-football game associated with the annual Princeton–Yale football weekend. The joint concert and football traditions remained active more than eighty years later. By 1948, the Nassoons held weekly informal performances at the Nassau Inn, rehearsed several times each week, and maintained a repertoire of approximately thirty-five to forty songs. New members initially served a probationary period before receiving full membership in the group.

=== Expansion and musical development, 1950s–1960s ===
During the 1950s, the Nassoons developed several features that became central to the group's long-term identity. The group established its headquarters in Room 100 of 1901 Hall, commonly known as the "'Soon Room", where it rehearsed and maintained its collection of arrangements and memorabilia. The four-tiger emblem associated with the group also took its enduring form during this period. A four-singer design first appeared on the group's 1949 album and was professionally redrawn for its 1951 release.

The decade was also important in the development and preservation of the group's repertoire. Nassoon arrangers increasingly moved beyond conventional block harmony, using the five voice parts to create independent inner lines, rhythmic accompaniments, and layered backgrounds beneath soloists. Alumni also undertook a systematic effort to recover and standardize the group's written music. Beginning in 1955, Herbert Spencer ’49 compiled surviving and reconstructed scores into a collection known as the Black Book. Completed in 1959, its first edition contained nearly 100 arrangements across 212 pages; supplements followed in 1964 and 1975.

Recordings became a regular part of the group's activity, with albums generally issued every two years. The Nassoons also appeared on the 1954 compilation WPRU Presents: Popular Music of Princeton and the 1962 release Traditional Songs of Princeton, which included performances with the Princeton Tigertones and the Princeton University Band. Touring expanded beyond the northeastern United States to destinations including Bermuda, Puerto Rico, Toronto, Florida, Jamaica, and the Bahamas. The group also made network-television appearances and maintained a regular schedule of performances at colleges, private events, clubs, and resorts.

During the early 1960s, arrangers including Richard Peterson ’60, Arthur Mellor ’63, and Kent Mullikin ’64 further developed the group's jazz-influenced five-part style. Arrangements from this period frequently alternated between featured soloists, smaller vocal ensembles, and the full group, while employing more complex internal harmonies. The group also expanded its body of Princeton songs and traditional material. In 1964, the Nassoons appeared on the RCA album Campus Hootenanny, recorded following an intercollegiate song festival at Brown University.

Later in the decade, the repertoire began to incorporate folk music, bossa nova, rock, and contemporary popular songs. Jackson Howe ’69's arrangements of "Cherish" and "Yesterday" were among the group's earliest sustained efforts to adapt contemporary rock and pop music to its established five-part format.

The Nassoons held their first large, formally organized alumni reunion in 1964. The event led to an annual gathering during Princeton's Reunions weekend, traditionally followed by singing at Blair Hall. Beginning in late 1964, the group also made recurring appearances at The Greenbrier resort in West Virginia.

=== Changes in repertoire and style, 1970s–1980s ===
The Nassoons substantially revised both their repertoire and performance practices during the 1970s. Music director Peter Urquhart ’74 reviewed arrangements that had been transmitted partly by ear and compared the versions being performed with surviving written scores. He restored several older works, revised others, and removed material that had fallen out of regular use. The project helped preserve arrangements whose harmonies and voice parts had changed after years of oral transmission.

The broader Princeton a cappella community expanded during the same period. The Princeton Tigerlilies were founded in 1971, and Urquhart and Tigerlily member Mimi Danley co-founded the Princeton Katzenjammers in 1973 as Princeton's first coeducational a cappella ensemble. Increased competition and coordination among campus groups later contributed to common rules governing auditions, song selection, and the scheduling of arch performances.

During the early 1980s, arrangers combined contemporary material with a renewed interest in jazz standards, Princeton songs, and older Nassoon repertoire. Songs by Van Morrison, Stevie Wonder, and the Doobie Brothers appeared alongside arrangements associated with Irving Berlin, Duke Ellington, and Charlie Parker. The group also adapted to changing recording technology, releasing its first album on cassette in 1986 and moving from vinyl records to compact discs with its 1990 album.

Transportation changes facilitated a growing performance schedule. The group acquired an automobile in 1980 and later purchased a used van, largely through the support of patron Frederick Koch. By the end of the decade, fall tours had expanded beyond regional travel; in 1989, the Nassoons undertook their first European tour, visiting West Germany and Switzerland.

=== International touring and performance development, 1990s ===
International touring became a regular part of the Nassoons' activities during the 1990s. The group returned to continental Europe in 1990 and subsequently toured Jordan in 1991, Japan and Hong Kong in 1992, Hungary in 1993, Switzerland in 1995, and the United Kingdom in 1996. These trips marked a transition from the primarily domestic and Caribbean touring patterns of earlier decades to a more extensive international schedule.

The repertoire also became more stylistically and culturally varied. Arrangements during the decade incorporated beatboxing, contemporary vocal-jazz techniques, choral works, and music drawn from Hawaiian, Indian, Israeli, South African, and other traditions. The 1994 album included "Lagta Nahin Hai Dil Mera", an arrangement of a poem attributed to the Mughal emperor Bahadur Shah Zafar, and "I Need You", which featured Tigerlily Kara McClendon ’94 as the first female guest vocalist on a Nassoons album. The group also performed mixed-voice choral repertoire with the Katzenjammers, including Franz Biebl's setting of "Ave Maria".

In 1994, the Nassoons created the office of performance director, assigning a member responsibility for choreography, staging, and the visual presentation of concerts. The position reflected a broader shift toward more deliberately staged performances and became one of the group's principal undergraduate offices.

Recording activity expanded alongside the repertoire. Five albums released during the decade introduced nearly forty new recorded songs, and the group increasingly drew upon arrangements associated with professional a cappella acts such as The Manhattan Transfer, The Nylons, Rockapella, and Take 6. In 1998, the Nassoons released their longest album to that point, with a running time exceeding seventy minutes.

=== Membership changes and renewed visibility, 2000s-2010s ===
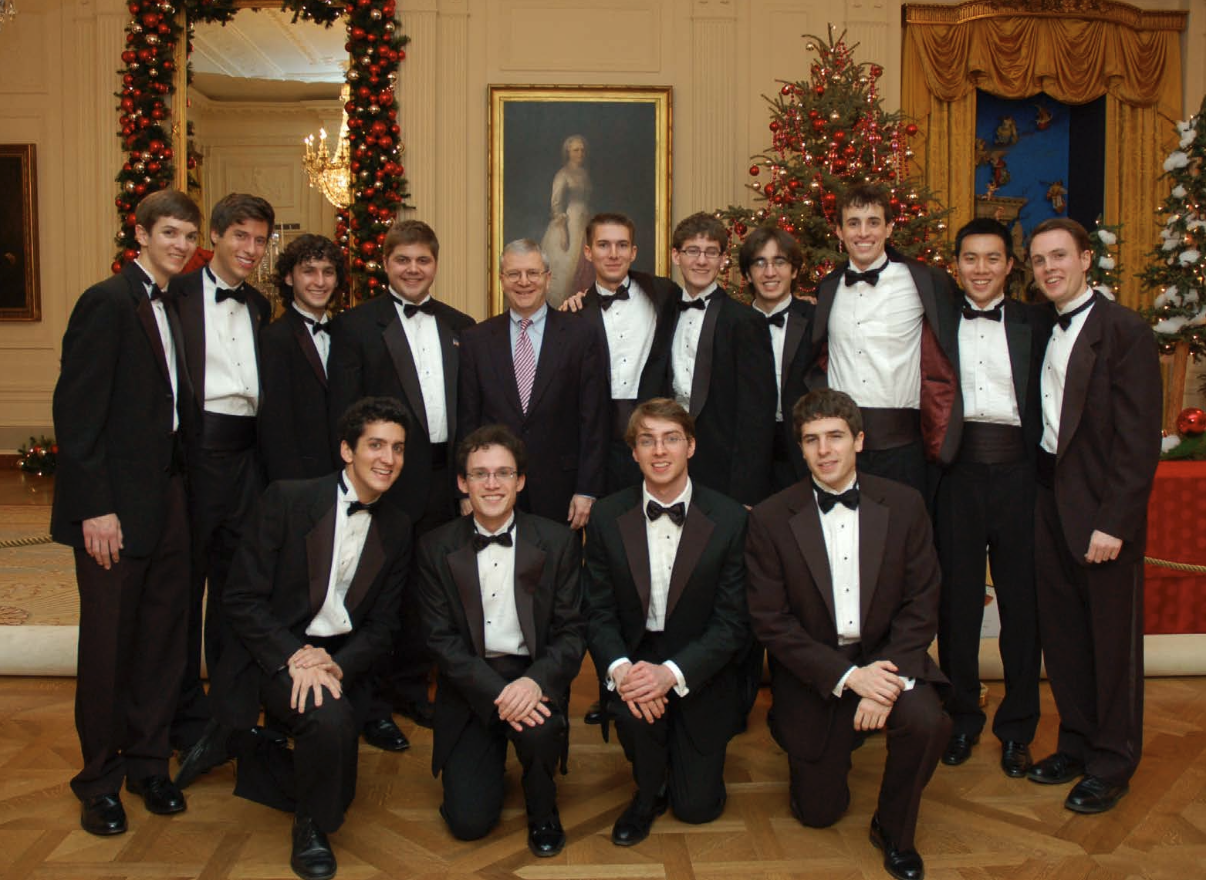
The Nassoons pose with Presidential Chief of Staff Joshua Bolten, Princeton Class of '76, after performing at the White House, December 2006

The Nassoons experienced a period of declining membership during the early 2000s. The group had no continuing members from the classes of 2000 or 2003 and, by 2003, had fallen to approximately eight active singers. Membership recovered through larger incoming classes beginning in the 2003–04 academic year. During the same period, the group created a tour manager position and continued to develop its performance-director system.

International touring resumed in the middle of the decade, including visits to Switzerland and France in 2005, Germany and Switzerland in 2006, and Germany and Austria in 2007. The group also performed at the White House in 1998 and again during the 2006 and 2007 holiday seasons. In 2006, it appeared on Good Morning America in connection with anchor Charles Gibson's final broadcast and participated in a segment associated with The Tonight Show with Jay Leno.

In 2008, the Nassoons submitted Jonathan Schwartz ’10's arrangement of Ben Folds's song "Time" to an open call for collegiate a cappella groups. Folds selected the submission from more than 250 entries and supervised the group's recording for the 2009 album Ben Folds Presents: University A Cappella!. He later invited the Nassoons to open a concert at McCarter Theatre.

The 2010s saw a renewed effort to add current popular music to the repertoire, including arrangements of songs associated with Beyoncé, Hozier, Ed Sheeran, and Hunter Hayes. The group continued to tour internationally, visiting French Riviera and Monaco in 2010, central Europe in 2011, Hong Kong in 2012, Switzerland and Liechtenstein in 2013, London in 2014, and South Korea in 2016. During the 2013–14 tour, the Nassoons gave a private performance at Vaduz Castle for members of the royal family of Liechtenstein.

In December 2011, the Nassoons performed with the Whiffenpoofs and the Harvard Krokodiloes in a benefit concert at Alice Tully Hall in New York. The group later appeared at Weill Recital Hall at Carnegie Hall in December 2015. In 2012, members appeared in the film Admission, performing "Tigertown Blues" in a scene filmed at Princeton.

The group marked its seventy-fifth anniversary with a reunion held in April 2016. The event included performances by alumni grouped by era, appearances by the undergraduate group, and a broader celebration of Princeton a cappella.

=== 2020s–present ===
After interruptions associated with the COVID-19 pandemic, the Nassoons resumed domestic and international touring. Tours during the decade included the United Kingdom in 2022, Japan and Spain in 2024, and Shanghai in 2025. The group released Nassoons 2024, a thirteen-track album containing ten newly recorded arrangements.

In 2024, the group gave a private performance for singer-songwriter Laufey, singing its arrangement of "Let You Break My Heart Again".

The Nassoons held their eighty-fifth-anniversary reunion at Nassau Presbyterian Church in April 2026. More than 200 current members, alumni, and family members attended. The undergraduate group opened the event, followed by alumni performances organized by decade and a closing performance involving the assembled singers. The celebration was the group's first major anniversary reunion since its planned eightieth-anniversary gathering was cancelled during the COVID-19 pandemic.

== Musical style and repertoire ==
The Nassoons traditionally arrange music for five principal voice parts: first tenor, second tenor, tenor-baritone, baritone, and bass. The tenor-baritone part occupies an inner range between the second tenor and baritone, allowing arrangements to employ denser chords, independent internal lines, and close-harmony voicings.

The group's early repertoire drew partly upon arrangements from the Princeton University Glee Club and the Whiffenpoofs, whose collegiate and barbershop traditions influenced the original ensemble. Members soon began creating their own arrangements, drawing upon swing-era vocal ensembles, jazz harmony, popular standards, and big band textures.

In-house arranging has remained a central feature of the group. During the 1960s and 1970s, its repertoire expanded beyond jazz standards, collegiate songs, folk music, and selections from the Great American Songbook to include rock, pop, soul, bluegrass, and classical music. Later arrangers added musical theatre, country, contemporary vocal jazz, and international repertoire while generally retaining the five-part framework.

Longstanding selections have included "Perfidia", "Tigertown Blues", "East of the Sun", "I Cover the Waterfront", "Shenandoah", and "All the Things You Are". "Perfidia", first performed in 1941, traditionally closes the group's concerts and is sung at alumni gatherings.

Original music written for the Nassoons includes Richard Armstrong ’46's "Tigertown Blues". The repertoire has also included parody material such as "Princeton Is Free", whose lyrics are set to the melody of "Under the Sea" from The Little Mermaid.

== Recordings ==
The Nassoons released their first album in 1942. Early recordings appeared on 78-rpm discs before the group adopted the long-playing record format in the 1950s. Twelve-inch albums permitted longer releases beginning in 1957, while cassettes accompanied the group's albums beginning in 1986. Its 1990 album was the first released on compact disc.

The group has also appeared on compilation recordings, including WPRU Presents: Popular Music of Princeton in 1954, Traditional Songs of Princeton in 1962, RCA's Campus Hootenanny in 1964, and Ben Folds Presents: University A Cappella! in 2009. Alumni produced the two-disc retrospective The Nassoons: The First Fifty Years in 1996, drawing from recordings across the group's first five decades.

The 2010 holiday release Christmas with the Princeton Nassoons gathered older seasonal arrangements and newly recorded material. Later releases were distributed through digital and streaming platforms in addition to physical formats.

== Organization and traditions ==
=== Soon Room ===
Room 100 of 1901 Hall has served as the Nassoons' principal rehearsal and meeting space since approximately 1949. Following the Princeton Class of 1901's fiftieth reunion in 1951, the room became the group's established headquarters, with the Nassoons also assuming responsibility for hosting auditions, callbacks, and preserving class memorabilia in the room.

=== Arch singing ===
Outdoor performances beneath Princeton's Gothic arches, commonly dubbed arch sings, have formed part of the group's activities since its early years. Blair Arch was used for early spring concerts and remains associated with major reunions and multi-group performances. The Nassoons later held regular fall performances at 1879 Arch and, beginning in the 1980s, spring performances at East Pyne Arch.

The Nassoons also participate in Acaprez, a coordinating organization for Princeton's undergraduate a cappella groups. Acaprez helps organize arch sings and establishes shared rules concerning auditions, scheduling, and repertoire ownership. The other member groups are the Tigertones, the Footnotes, the Tigerlilies, the Tigressions, the Wildcats, the Katzenjammers, and Roaring Twenty.

=== Reunions and alumni association ===
The first large, organized Nassoons reunion was held in 1964. It developed into an annual gathering during Princeton's Reunions weekend, with larger anniversary celebrations generally held every five years. Alumni traditionally perform by generation before joining the undergraduate group in shared repertoire.

The Princeton Nassoon Alumni Association was formally ratified in 1991. It supports the undergraduate ensemble, organizes alumni events, assists with reunions and touring, and preserves the group's archives, recordings, arrangements, and memorabilia. The association has also supported the digitization of older music and recordings and maintains representation from the undergraduate group on its governing board.

=== Relationship with the Whiffenpoofs ===
The Nassoons have maintained a longstanding relationship with Yale's Whiffenpoofs. The groups have performed together during Princeton–Yale football weekends since the Nassoons' early years and have also participated in an annual touch-football game dating to 1947.

== Tours ==
Touring has been a regular part of the Nassoons' activities since the group's early years. Extended spring tours during the 1950s and 1960s included destinations in Canada, Bermuda, Puerto Rico, the Bahamas, Jamaica, and Florida. The group undertook its first European tour in 1989 and subsequently expanded its touring schedule to include Europe, East Asia, the Middle East, Latin America, and the Caribbean.

Selected international tours since 1989
Year	Tour period	Destinations
1989	Fall	West Germany and Switzerland
1990	Fall	Germany, Austria, Italy, Liechtenstein, and Switzerland
1991	Fall	Jordan
1992	Fall	Japan and Hong Kong
1993	Fall	Hungary
1994	Fall	Jamaica
1995	Spring	Switzerland
1995	Fall	London, United Kingdom
2000	Winter	British Virgin Islands
2000	Fall	Taiwan
2002	Winter	Dominican Republic
2003	Winter	Mexico
2005	Fall	Switzerland and France
2006	Fall	Switzerland and Germany
2007	Winter	Germany and Austria
2009	Winter	Brazil
2010	Spring	Germany
2010	Fall	French Riviera and Monaco
2011	Winter	Germany and Austria
2012	Spring	Switzerland, Germany, Liechtenstein, Italy, and Austria
2013	Winter	Hong Kong
2014	Winter	Switzerland and Liechtenstein
2015	Winter	London, United Kingdom
2016	Spring	Seoul, South Korea
2019	Fall	Singapore
2022	Fall	London and Cambridge, United Kingdom
2024	Spring	Japan
2024	Fall	Madrid and Barcelona, Spain
2025	Fall	Shanghai, China
