= Spring Will Be a Little Late This Year =

1943 traditional pop composition by Frank Loesser

"Spring Will Be a Little Late This Year" is the title of a 1943 traditional pop composition by Frank Loesser, written for and introduced in the 1944 film Christmas Holiday, the song was largely overlooked for some ten years before being rediscovered in the mid-1950s to become a pop and jazz standard much recorded by vocalists and instrumentalists.

== Composition / theme ==
An early instance of Frank Loesser writing his own music for his lyrics, "Spring Will Be a Little Late This Year" has been described by singer Michael Feinstein - the "foremost expert on the music of the Great American Songbook" - as "a perfect example of that heart-on-your-sleeve quality evident in so many [Loesser songs]." The composer's daughter: Susan Loesser, classes the song as a rare "melancholy" item in her father's songbook, but one whose lyric is "not without hope". "Spring Will Be ..." belongs to a sub-genre of songs which treat springtime as a metaphor in an ironic context, the most extreme exemplars such as "Spring Is Here" and "Spring Can Really Hang You Up the Most" "upend[ing] the conventional view of spring as the season of rebirth [to instead] use spring as the setting for expressions of disenchantment or remorse": however "Loesser's lyric ... follow[s] a middle course, evoking a state of mind neither breezily cheerful nor trite; but not unremittingly dark either."

== First recordings and Christmas Holiday ==
"Spring Will Be a Little Late This Year" was written for the film Christmas Holiday to be sung by the female lead Deanna Durbin, a movie musical star from the age of 14 who at age 23 was making a career shift with an essentially dramatic role as a fallen woman working a taxi dance hall near New Orleans. The film discreetly posits Durbin's character as a singer who is first seen singing "Spring Will Be ..." at the dance hall in a performance which eschews Durbin's established "perky upbeat operetta persona" in favor of a "downbeat bluesy jazz" style. The lyrics of "Spring Will Be ..." touch on the film's plot: Dean Harens plays a serviceman who, just after receiving a Dear John letter, is flying home for Christmas when a storm mandates a layover in New Orleans. Meeting Durbin at the dance hall, Harens treats her chivalrously, and she eventually confides her sad history. Once married to a charming roué (Gene Kelly) who has been jailed for murder, Durbin is now self-indentured at the dance hall as penance for failing to somehow save her husband from himself. Subsequent to a denouement which frees Durbin from her thralldom, with imminent romance with Harens implied, Christmas Holiday ends with Durbin gazing up at an overcast sky whose clouds drift apart as she watches.

Completed in February 1944, Christmas Holiday would be released June 1944 to become a box office hit while making only a transient impression on the public consciousness, suggesting that moviegoers anticipating the lighter fare associated with Deanna Durbin and Gene Kelly were disappointed by Christmas Holiday and preferred to forget the film, whose few critical notices virtually ignored "Spring Will Be a Little Late This Year" (Margaret Bean of the Spokesman-Review dismissed the film's "new song" as "not too appealing"). The song had already had three recorded versions prior to the film's release, beginning with that by Johnnie Johnston with the Paul Weston Orchestra, released March 1944 (the song serving as B-side to a 78-rpm single entitled "Irresistible You"), followed by recordings by Percy Faith (recorded April 24, 1944), as an instrumental) and Morton Downey (recorded May 8, 1944, for June 8, release). Also recorded in 1944 by Eddy Howard, "Spring Will Be ..." was recorded by Deanna Durbin - in her signature soprano - in a December 1944 session in which Durbin also recorded the other song she'd sung in Christmas Holiday: "Always", with the tracks being paired on a March 1945 single release (on which "Always" was designated as A-side). Durbin's studio recording of "Spring Will Be ..." is the first evident instance of the song's two verses being preceded by a four line song intro which has rarely been included in subsequent recordings of the song. (See sidebox below.)

== Rediscovery ==
As with its parent film, "Spring Will Be a Little Late This Year" seemed to soon lose such attention as it had garnered, the first evident recording of the song subsequent to 1944 being a 1950 release by the Ralph Flanagan Orchestra with vocalist Harry Prime. The song seems to have come to the fore due to its being recorded in the mid-1950s by Sarah Vaughan, who was evidently the first female vocalist to record "Spring Will Be ..." since Deanna Durbin in 1944, Vaughan also evidently being the song's first jazz-influenced interpreter. Vaughan first recorded "Spring Will Be ..." in a January 5, 1953, session with the Percy Faith Orchestra - Faith having made one of the earliest recordings of the song; the track being released as a single March 3, 1953, and appeared on the 1955 album Sarah Vaughan in Hi-Fi. Subsequent to Vaugahn's version, "Spring Will Be ..." has been recorded on a constant basis mostly by jazz-influenced and/or traditional pop vocalists, mostly female. ("Nearly all the best songs about spring are about disappointment, and all the best versions are by tuned-in women who know the score.")

As sung by Deanna Durbin in the film Christmas Holiday, "Spring Will Be a Little Late This Year" featured two verses of four lines. A musically distinct four-line introduction to these two verses evidently debuted on disc on the studio recording of "Spring Will Be ..." made by Durbin in December 1944 (although this musical intro was heard as early as March 31, 1944, in a performance of "Spring Will Be ..." by Georgia Gibbs on the radio program Camel Caravan). Generally omitted by the song's performers, this intro may be heard in the recordings of "Spring Will Be ..." made by Helen Merrill, Eydie Gormé, the Randy Van Horne Singers, Joanie Sommers, Audrey Morris, Lina Nyberg, Barbara Lea and Seth MacFarlane.

== Recorded versions ==
Vocal versions of "Spring Will Be a Little Late This Year" include those recorded by (album titles in italics):

- Johnnie Johnston with the Paul Weston Orchestra: 78-rpm single 1944
- Morton Downey: 78-rpm single 1944
- Sarah Vaughan with the Percy Faith Orchestra 78-rpm single 1953
- Steve Allen Steve Sings 1956
- Ray Charles Singers Spring is Here 1956
- Helen Merrill Helen Merrill With Strings 1956
- Rita Reys with the Jazz Messengers The Cool Voice of Rita Reys 1956
- Four Lads The Four Lads Sing Frank Loesser 1957
- Joni James Joni Sings Songs by Frank Loesser 1956
- Dick Haymes Little White Lies 1958
- Ella Fitzgerald Hello Love 1960
- Leslie Uggams So in Love! 1963
- Larry Hovis Hogan's Heroes Sing the Best of World War II (multi-artist album) 1966
- Julie London Easy Does It 1968
- Lee Wiley Back Home Again: All New Performances 1971
- Reg Varney Reg's Party 1973
- Margaret Whiting & Johnny Desmond Ben Bagley's Frank Loesser Revisited (multi-artist album) 1974
- Audrey Morris Film Noir 1989

Loesser's widow, singer-actress Jo Sullivan on her favorite Frank Loesser song: "For me, I think it would have to be "Spring Will Be a Little Late This Year" ... It's a hell of a song."

- Jo Sullivan Loesser Loesser by Loesser - Salute to Frank Loesser by Jo Sullivan Loesser (1992)
- Abbey Lincoln Devil's Got Your Tongue 1992
- Sathima Bea Benjamin A Morning In Paris 1997 (album recorded February 24, 1963)
- Carly Simon Film Noir 1997
- Lina Nyberg Smile 2000
- Kitty Margolis Left Coast Life 2001

The song has also been established as a favored piece by pop and jazz instrumentalists, exemplified by recorded versions by (album titles in italics):

- Percy Faith Orchestra: 78-rpm single 1944
- Frankie Carle & his Orchestra Frankie Carle Plays Frank Loesser 1950
- Ralph Sharon Spring Fever 1953
- Mundell Lowe The Mundell Lowe Quintet 1954
- Percy Faith Orchestra North & South of the Border 1955
- Dick Marx & John Frigo (medley: "Spring Is Here/ Spring Will Be a Little Late This Year") Too Much Piano 1955
- Dennis Farnon & his Orchestra Caution! Men Swinging 1957
- Camarata Spring 1958
- Ahmad Jamal Trio Count 'Em 88 1956
- Sal Salvador Quartet Colors in Sound 1958
- Red Garland All Kinds of Weather 1959
- Richard Maltby & his Orchestra Swingin' Down the Lane 1959
- Roland Kirk Domino 1962
- Ramsey Lewis Trio Sound of Spring 1962
- Buddy DeFranco & Tommy Gumina Pol.Y Tones 1963
- Tommy Gwaltney with Steve Jordan & John Eaton Great Jazz 1963
- Archie Semple The Twilight Cometh 1963
- Ronnie Aldrich The Romantic Pianos of Ronnie Aldrich 1964
- Ferrante & Teicher Ferrante & Teicher 1971
- Pim Jacobs Trio Come Fly With Me 1982
- Yehudi Menuhin & Stéphane Grappelli For All Seasons 1985
- Loren Schoenberg & his Jazz Orchestra Time Waits For No One 1987
- Harry Allen Quartet Blue Skies - Jazz Ballads From the 1930s to Today 1994
- Larry Porter Trio March Blues 1995
- Benny Carter & Phil Woods Another Time, Another Place 1996
- Peter Mintun Piano at the Paramount 1997
- Bob Alberti Trio Nice & Easy 1998
- Chris Anderson From the Heart 1998
- Larry Coryell Private Concert 1998
- Wynton Marsalis Standard Time, Vol. 5: The Midnight Blues 1998
- Joe Locke & David Hazeltine QuartetMutual Admiration Society 1999
- David Murray Quartet Seasons 1999
- Ralph Sharon Quartet Ralph Sharon Quartet Plays the Frank Loesser Songbook 1999
- John Bunch Trio World War II Love Songs 2001
- Ken Peplowski Quartet When You Wish Upon a Star 2007
- Curtis Fuller The Story of Cathy & Me 2011
