= After Hours (1955 Sarah Vaughan album) =

Compilation album by Sarah Vaughan
- Released: 1955
- Label: Columbia

Sarah Vaughan chronology
Sarah Vaughan in Hi-Fi (1955)	After Hours (1955)	Sassy (1955)

After Hours with Sarah Vaughan is a compilation album by Sarah Vaughan released in 1955 on the Columbia Records label. She recorded for Columbia from 1949 to 1953 and the album picks up some of her choice recordings for the label.

== Track listing ==
1. After Hours
2. Street of Dreams
3. You Taught Me to Love Again
4. You're Mine, You (Johnny Green, Edward Heyman)
5. My Reverie
6. Summertime
7. Black Coffee
8. Thinking of You
9. I Cried for You
10. Perdido
11. Deep Purple
12. Just Friends
