= East of the Sun (and West of the Moon) =

Song written by Brooks Bowman

"East of the Sun (and West of the Moon)" is a popular song written by Brooks Bowman, an undergraduate member of Princeton University's Class of 1936, for the 1934 production of the Princeton Triangle Club's production of Stags at Bay. It was published in 1934 by Santly Bros. and soon became a hallmark of the Princeton Tigertones, one of Princeton University's signature all-male a cappella groups. The Princeton Triangle Club performs the number every year at its annual Frosh Week show, and it is also sung by the Princeton Nassoons. It has remained part of the standard jazz repertoire since the 1950s.

== Recorded versions ==
- "East of the Sun" was first recorded by Hal Kemp for Brunswick Records on Dec. 1, 1934.
- The version recorded by Tom Coakley and His Orchestra (vocal refrain by Carl Ravazza) topped the Your Hit Parade chart for two weeks in September 1935.
- Arthur Tracy recorded it on September 22, 1935, according to CD jacket of ASV Living Era Hits of '35, CD AJA 5185.
- Tommy Dorsey recorded it in 1940 with vocals by Frank Sinatra, a trumpet solo by Bunny Berigan, and backup slang lyrics.
- Sarah Vaughan recorded it in a 1949 Columbia session for the album Sarah Vaughan in Hi-Fi., and also her 1953 EP Hot Jazz.
- Charlie Parker recorded it on six separate dates, the earliest being a live recording at the Royal Roost in New York City on New Year's Day, 1949, and the last a live recording from Birdland in New York City on August 27, 1954. It is featured on numerous albums, including two renditions on The Complete Legendary Rockland Palace Date 1952.
- Benny Goodman recorded a memorable version with his sextet, also in 1952; this performance is included on Benny Goodman Sextet.
- Bud Powell recorded it in 1955 for his album Piano Interpretations by Bud Powell.
- Stan Getz recorded it in 1955, and it was featured as the first track on his seminal double album West Coast Jazz.
- Oscar Peterson released a version on his 1956 album, Pastel Moods.
- George Shearing recorded it live on his album George Shearing on Stage!
- Louis Armstrong recorded it on his 1958 album Louis Under the Stars.
- The Four Freshmen recorded it on their album Four Freshmen and Five Saxes (1957).
- Keely Smith recorded it in 1958 for her Capitol album, Politely! with Billy May & His Orchestra.
- Lee Wiley recorded it for West of the Moon (1958).
- Ella Fitzgerald recorded it on her 1959 Verve release Ella Fitzgerald Sings Sweet Songs for Swingers, with the Frank De Vol Orchestra and Harry "Sweets" Edison on trumpet.
- Frank Sinatra re-recorded it on his 1961 tribute album I Remember Tommy.
- Al Hirt recorded it on his 1962 album, Trumpet and Strings.
- Cal Tjader recorded it on his 1964 album, Breeze from the East.
- Charles Lloyd recorded it in 1964 for his album Nirvana.
- Ellis Marsalis recorded it on the 1991, Wynton Marsalis album Standard Time, Vol. 2: Intimacy Calling.
- Tony Bennett recorded it on his 1992 tribute to Sinatra Perfectly Frank.
- Betty Carter recorded it on her 1996 album I'm Yours, You're Mine.
- Diana Krall recorded it twice, on her 1999 album When I Look in Your Eyes and on her 2002 album Live in Paris (aka. A Night in Paris).
- Peter Stampfel recorded it on his 5-disc 20th Century in 100 Songs (2021) representing the year 1934.

Other versions recorded include:

- Billie Holiday
- Dakota Staton Lester Young,
- Scott Hamilton (1993)
- Sonny and Perley (1999)
- Alexis Cole (2005)
- Rebecca Parris (2007)
- Joshua Redman (2007).
