= It's Magic =

Single by Doris Day
- B-side: "Put 'Em in a Box, Tie 'Em With a Ribbon"
- Released: 1947
- Genre: Traditional pop
- Label: Columbia
- Composer: Jule Styne
- Lyricist: Sammy Cahn

"It's Magic" is a popular song written by Jule Styne, with lyrics by Sammy Cahn, published in 1947. They wrote the song for Doris Day in her Warner Brothers film debut, Romance on the High Seas (retitled It's Magic in the United Kingdom, after the song). In the autumn of 1948 Vic Damone, Tony Martin, Dick Haymes, Gordon MacRae and Sarah Vaughan all charted on Billboard magazine charts with versions of the song, but none as successfully as Day's recording. "It's Magic" received an Academy Award nomination for Best Song, but in March 1949 lost to "Buttons and Bows" by Jay Livingston and Ray Evans.

In 1952, Day made the song the theme of her Hollywood radio series, The Doris Day Show.

== Recordings ==
- The Doris Day recording was released by Columbia Records as catalog number 38188. In September 1948 the single peaked at no. 2 on Billboard's Retail Record Sales chart during a 21-week run.
- The Tony Martin recording was released by RCA Victor Records as catalog number 20-2862. The recording spent 13 weeks on the Billboard chart, peaking at position no. 11.
- The Dick Haymes recording was released by Decca Records as catalog number 23826. The recording spent 18 weeks on the Billboard chart, peaking at position no. 9.
- The Gordon MacRae recording was released by Capitol Records as catalog number 15072. The recording spent 17 weeks on the Billboard chart, peaking at position no. 9.
- The Sarah Vaughan recording was released by Musicraft Records as catalog number 557. The recording spent two weeks on the Billboard chart, peaking at position no. 29. It appeared on the EP The Divine Sarah Sings (1954).
- In 1949, the song was featured on a selection of songs from the film It's Magic (the UK title for Romance on the High Seas) recorded by Peter Yorke and his Concert Orchestra, with vocals by Steve Conway, and issued by Columbia. The same year, a version of the song by Geraldo and his Orchestra, with vocals by Denny Vaughan, was released by Parlophone.
- Beverly Kenney recorded the song in 1958 for her album Beverly Kenney Sings for Playboys.
- Dinah Washington recorded the song in 1959 for her album What a Diff'rence a Day Makes!.
- Keely Smith recorded it in 1959 for her Capitol album, Swingin' Pretty, arranged and conducted by Nelson Riddle.
- Shirley Bassey recorded the song in 1963 for her EP In Other Words....
- In 2010, Australian singer Melinda Schneider recorded the song for her Doris Day tribute album Melinda Does Doris.
- Barbara Lewis recorded the song in 1965, and it was included in her album of the same name.
- In 1962, The Platters, with Sonny Turner singing lead, released it as a single. It reached 95 on the Billboard chart. It was also featured on their 1961 album Song for the Lonely.
- Eddi Reader recorded the song for her 2009 album Love Is the Way.
- It is the title cut to the 2013 album It's Magic - The songs of Sammy Cahn recorded by Steve Tyrell, featuring a saxophone solo by David Mann.
- To celebrate the one hundredth birthday of Sammy Cahn, a 2013 album was released featuring an ensemble of vocalists and jazz combo for the CD, It's Magic.
- Frank Sinatra has at least one well-known version of the song recorded.
- Eric Dolphy recorded an instrumental version of the song in December 1960, for his album Far Cry which was released in 1962.

== Other film versions ==
- As it was part of the Warner studio music catalog, Bugs Bunny parodied the song in the 1951 Looney Tunes cartoon Rabbit Every Monday, with several verses beginning with "Carrots are divine...You get a dozen for a dime. It's magic." In his 1953 Warner Brothers cartoon Robot Rabbit, Bugs reprised this parody with a shorter version. In a later short, 1963's Transylvania 6-5000, Bugs hums/sings the melody, inserting magic words that he acquired from a book and unknowingly causing troublesome transformations in the short's antagonist, Count Bloodcount.
- The 1967 motion picture The Cool Ones featured Mrs. Miller doing a rock-flavored version of the song.
