= In the Land of Hi-Fi (Sarah Vaughan album) =

1955 studio album by jazz singer Sarah Vaughan

Studio album by Sarah Vaughan
- Released: 1955
- Recorded: October 25–27, 1955
- Genre: Vocal jazz
- Length: 33:02
- Label: EmArcy
- Producer: Bob Shad

Sarah Vaughan chronology
Sarah Vaughan with Clifford Brown (1954)	In the Land of Hi-Fi (1955)	Sassy (1956)

Professional ratings
Review scores
Source	Rating
AllMusic	4.5/5 stars
The Rolling Stone Album Guide	3/5 stars

In the Land of Hi-Fi is a 1955 studio album by the American jazz singer Sarah Vaughan. It was recorded October 25–27, 1955, in New York City. Alternate takes from these sessions, featuring a young Cannonball Adderley, were compiled on The Complete Sarah Vaughan On Mercury, Vol. 1 - Great Jazz Years 1954-1956.

== Track listing ==
1. "Over the Rainbow" (Harold Arlen, E.Y. "Yip" Harburg) – 3:30
2. "Soon" (George Gershwin, Ira Gershwin) – 2:37
3. "Cherokee" (Ray Noble) – 2:32
4. "I'll Never Smile Again" (Ruth Lowe) – 2:35
5. "Don't Be on the Outside" (George Kelly, Mayme Watts, Sidney Wyche) – 3:01
6. "How High the Moon" (Morgan Lewis, Nancy Hamilton) – 2:36
7. "It Shouldn't Happen to a Dream" (Duke Ellington, Don George, Johnny Hodges) – 3:20
8. "Sometimes I'm Happy" (Vincent Youmans, Irving Caesar) – 2:57
9. "Maybe" (G. Gershwin, I. Gershwin) – 2:34
10. "An Occasional Man" (Ralph Blane, Hugh Martin) – 2:33
11. "Why Can't I?" (Richard Rodgers, Lorenz Hart) – 2:54
12. "Oh My" (Joe Greene) – 2:21

== Personnel ==
- Sarah Vaughan – vocals

The Ernie Wilkins orchestra

- Ernie Royal, Bernie Glow – trumpet
- Kai Winding, J. J. Johnson – trombones
- Cannonball Adderley, Sam Marowitz – alto saxophone
- Jerome Richardson – flute, tenor saxophone
- Jimmy Jones – piano
- Turk Van Lake – guitar
- Joe Benjamin – double bass
- Roy Haynes – drums
- Ernie Wilkins – arranger, conductor

Production

- Dennis Drake – remixing, remastering
- Ellie Hughes, Tom Hughes – artwork, design
- Seth Rothstein, Richard Seidel – preparation
- Bob Shad – producer
