= Blah Blah Blah (Gershwin song) =

Song by George and Ira Gershwin

Song
- Published: 1931
- Composer(s): George Gershwin
- Lyricist(s): Ira Gershwin

"Blah, Blah, Blah" is a 1931 song with music by George Gershwin, to lyrics by his brother Ira Gershwin. Originally written for the abortive East is West it was taken "out of the trunk" by the Gershwins for the 1931 film Delicious. It was later used in the 2012 Broadway musical Nice Work If You Can Get It, which features songs by George and Ira.

It goes in part:

Blah, Blah, Blah, blah moon, Blah, Blah, Blah above. Blah, Blah, Blah, blah croon, Blah, Blah, Blah, blah love."

The song is a parody of the clichés of contemporary love songs; Gerald Mast in Can't Help Singin' describes the "treacly tune" and Ira Gershwin's "refusal to write coherent words except the hackneyed rhymes to conclude every line".

== Notable covers ==
- Eliane Elias – Everything I Love (Blue Note, 2000)
- Sarah Vaughan – Snowbound (Roulette, 1963)
- John Muriello & Richard Pearson Thomas - Love and the Dickens (Albany Records, 2008)
