= Vaughan and Violins =

Studio album by Sarah Vaughan
- Released: March 1959
- Recorded: July 7–12, 1958; Paris
- Genre: Vocal jazz
- Length: 41:40
- Label: Mercury
- Producer: Jack Tracy

Sarah Vaughan chronology
After Hours at the London House (1959)	Vaughan and Violins (1959)	The Magic of Sarah Vaughan (1959)

Vaughan and Violins is a 1959 album by Sarah Vaughan, orchestrated and conducted by Quincy Jones.

== Reception ==
Professional ratings
Review scores
Source	Rating
AllMusic	4.5/5 stars

In a review of a compilation release of Vaughan and Violins and Vaughan with Voices (1964), Dave Nathan of AllMusic awarded the album four and a half stars and said that "these sessions catch Sarah Vaughan at her magnificent best. There may be claims of overdoing it or garishness. But her set of pipes and her willingness to use them dramatically, and sometimes coyly, to bring out the best of everything she sings brushes aside such criticisms as unjustified. Classic standard or novelty tune, she had full command of the vocal art."

== Track listing ==
1. "Please Be Kind" (Sammy Cahn, Saul Chaplin) – 3:15
2. "The Midnight Sun Will Never Set" (Dorcas Cochran, Quincy Jones, Henri Salvador) – 2:50
3. "Live for Love" (Paul Misraki, Carl Sigman) – 3:23
4. "Misty" (Johnny Burke, Erroll Garner) – 3:02
5. "I'm Lost" (Otis René) – 3:40
6. "Love Me" (John Lehmann, John Lewis) – 3:12
7. "That's All" (Alan Brandt, Bob Haymes) – 3:31
8. "Day by Day" (Sammy Cahn, Axel Stordahl, Paul Weston) – 3:10
9. "Gone with the Wind" (Herbert Magidson, Allie Wrubel) – 3:28
10. "I'll Close My Eyes" (Buddy Kaye, Billy Reid) – 3:40
11. "The Thrill Is Gone" (Lew Brown, Ray Henderson) – 2:28

== Personnel ==
- Sarah Vaughan – vocals
- Quincy Jones – arranger, conductor
- Zoot Sims – saxophone
- Ronnell Bright – piano
- Richard Davis – bass
- Pierre Michelot – bass
- Kenny Clarke – drums
