= Sarah Vaughan's Golden Hits =

Compilation album by Sarah Vaughan
- Released: 1961
- Label: Mercury

Professional ratings
Review scores
Source	Rating
AllMusic	3/5 stars
Billboard	4/4 stars

Sarah Vaughan's Golden Hits is a compilation album by Sarah Vaughan released in 1961 on Mercury Records.

== Track listing ==
12-inch LP (Mercury – MG 20645, SR 60645)

Side 1
No.	Title	Writer(s)	Length
1.	"Misty"	Johnny Burke & Erroll Garner	2:59
2.	"Broken Hearted Melody"	Hal David & Sherman Edwards	2:15
3.	"Make Yourself Comfortable"	Bob Merrill	2:36
4.	"Autumn in New York"	Vernon Duke	3:15
5.	"Moonlight in Vermont"	Karl Suessdorf & John Blackburn	3:27
6.	"How Important Can It Be"	George Weiss & Bennie Benjamin	2:27

Side 2
No.	Title	Writer(s)	Length
1.	"Smooth Operator"	Murray Stein & Clyde Otis	2:17
2.	"Whatever Lola Wants"	Jerry Ross & Richard Adler	2:35
3.	"Lullaby of Birdland"	Shearing–Forster	3:55
4.	"Eternally"	Geoffrey Parsons & Charles Chaplin	2:20
5.	"Poor Butterfly"	Hubbell–Golden	3:28
6.	"Close to You"	Jerry Livingston, Carl Lampl, Al Hoffman	3:03
