= My Reverie =

1938 popular song with lyrics by Larry Clinton

"My Reverie" is a 1938 popular song with lyrics by Larry Clinton. Its melody is based on the 1890 piano piece Rêverie by the French classical composer Claude Debussy.

== Recordings ==
A 1938 recording of the song by Clinton and his band with Bea Wain as the vocalist was a hit, reaching the top of the Billboard Record Buying Guide in the same year.

The tune went on to be recorded by many others and those with charted versions in 1938 were Bing Crosby (recorded October 14, 1938, reaching #3 in the charts), Mildred Bailey (#10), Glenn Miller (#11) and Eddy Duchin (#13). Other versions have been recorded by Tony Bennett (for his 1955 album Cloud 7), Keely Smith (for her 1959 album Be My Love), Sarah Vaughan (who recorded it twice, 1950 and also for her 1963 album Sarah Slightly Classical), Betty Carter, Helen Forrest, and Ella Fitzgerald (for her 1961 album Clap Hands, Here Comes Charlie!), as well as bands led by Paul Whiteman, Dizzy Gillespie, Sonny Rollins, Stan Kenton, Nelson Eddy, Esquivel, and Ray Conniff.

== Appearances in other media ==
The original Bea Wain recording of "My Reverie" was used in the 2002 film One Hour Photo and in the 2011 television miniseries Mildred Pierce.

== References in popular culture ==
In James A. Michener's 1971 novel The Drifters, characters discuss Bea Wain and her recording of "My Reverie" in two separate chapters of the book.
