= Close to You (Sarah Vaughan album) =

Studio album by Sarah Vaughan
- Released: 1960
- Recorded: 1960
- Genre: Vocal jazz
- Length: 38:46
- Label: Mercury

Sarah Vaughan chronology
The Magic of Sarah Vaughan (1959)	Close to You (1960)	Dreamy (1960)

Close to You is a 1960 studio album by Sarah Vaughan, arranged by Belford Hendricks and Fred Norman.

Professional ratings
Review scores
Source	Rating
AllMusic	3/5 stars

== Track listing ==
1. "Say It Isn't So" (Irving Berlin) - 2:47
2. "Missing You" (Ronnell Bright) - 2:50
3. "I've Got to Talk to My Heart" (Bright) - 2:56
4. "I'll Never Be The Same" (Matty Malneck, Frank Signorelli, Gus Kahn) - 2:24
5. "There's No You" (Tom Adair, Hal Hopper) - 2:20
6. "I Should Care" (Sammy Cahn, Axel Stordahl, Paul Weston) - 3:23
7. "If You Are But a Dream" (Moe Jaffe, Jack Fulton, Nat Bonx) - 2:47
8. "Maybe You'll Be There" (Rube Bloom, Sammy Gallop) - 2:50
9. "Out of This World" (Harold Arlen, Johnny Mercer) - 2:28
10. "Last Night When We Were Young" (Arlen, Yip Harburg) - 2:50
11. "Funny" (Irving Reid, Ira Kosloff, Gwynn Elias) - 2:55
12. "Close to You" (Jerry Livingston, Carl Lampl, Al Hoffman) - 3:03

== Personnel ==
- Sarah Vaughan - vocals
- Belford Hendricks - arranger, conductor
- Fred Norman
