= The Magic of Sarah Vaughan =

Studio album by Sarah Vaughan
- Released: 1959
- Label: Mercury

Sarah Vaughan chronology
Vaughan and Violins (1959)	The Magic of Sarah Vaughan (1959)	Close to You (1960)

Professional ratings
Review scores
Source	Rating
Billboard	positive
Billboard	positive
Billboard	positive (1964 reissue)

The Magic of Sarah Vaughan is a studio album by Sarah Vaughan released in 1959 on Mercury Records.

== Track listing ==
12-inch LP (Mercury – MG 20438, SR 60110)

Side 1
No.	Title	Length
1.	"That Old Black Magic"	2:50
2.	"Careless"	2:05
3.	"Separate Ways"	2:20
4.	"Are You Certain"	2:12
5.	"Mary Contrary"	2:38
6.	"Broken-Hearted Melody"	2:15

Side 2
No.	Title	Length
1.	"I've Got the World on a String"	3:05
2.	"Don't Look at Me That Way"	2:10
3.	"Love Is a Random Thing"	2:47
4.	"Friendly Enemies"	2:15
5.	"What's So Bad About It"	1:55
6.	"Sweet Affection"	2:01
