= Miracles of Modern Science =

American indie rock band

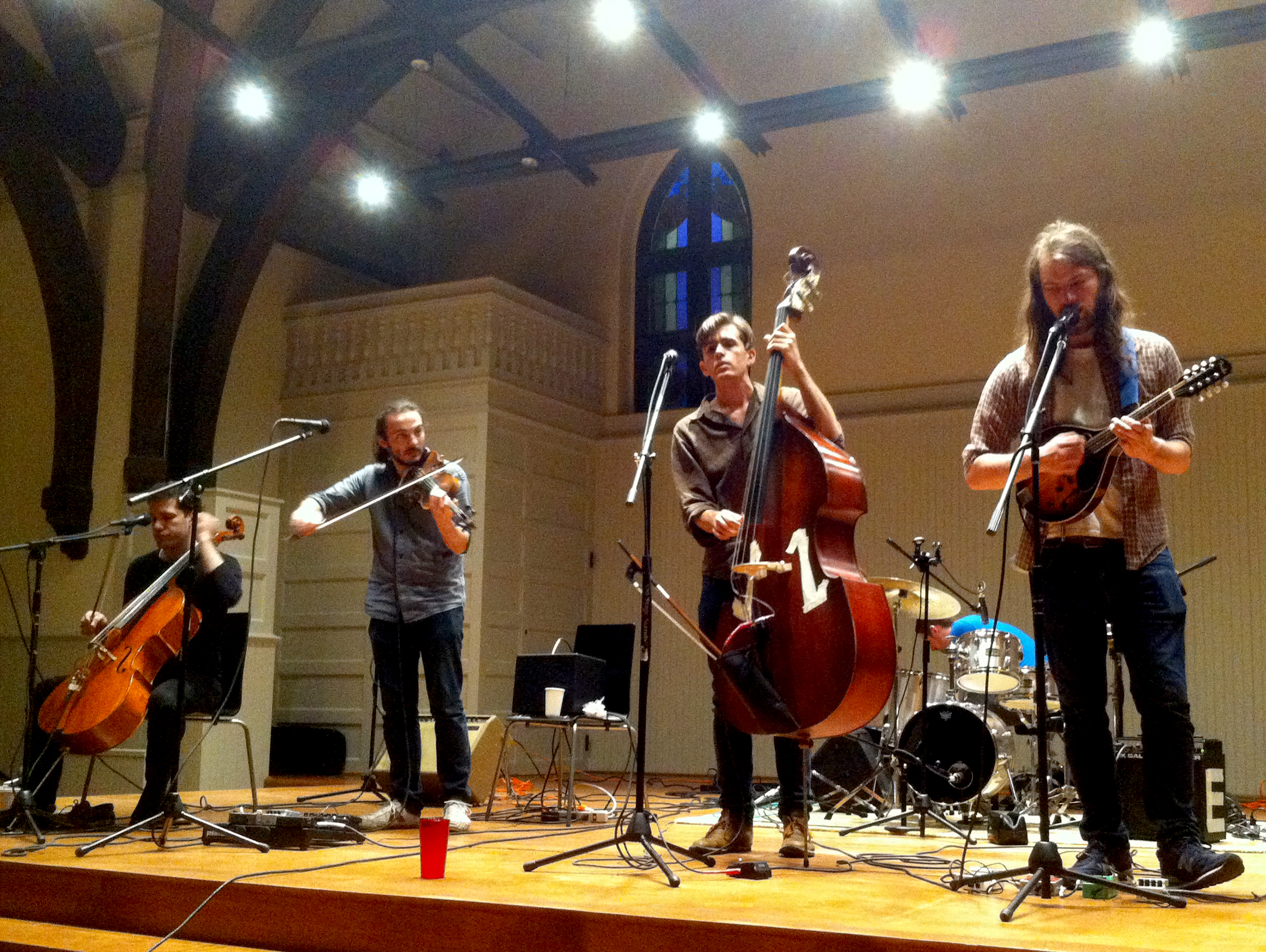
- Miracles of Modern Science performing at The Haven in Charlottesville, VA

Background information
- Origin: Princeton, NJ, United States
- Genres: Indie rock, chamber pop
- Years active: 2005–present
- Members: Evan Younger; Josh Hirshfeld; Kieran Ledwidge; Geoff McDonald; Serge Terentev
- Past members: Tyler Pines
- Website: miraclesofmodernscience.com

Miracles of Modern Science (or MOMS) is an American independent band formed at Princeton University in 2005. The band is composed of Evan Younger (double bass, lead vocals), Josh Hirshfeld (mandolin, vocals), Kieran Ledwidge (violin), Geoff McDonald (cello), and Serge Terentev (drums). Their musical style stems from modern orchestrations for classical string instruments.

== History ==
=== Origins (2004–2007) ===
Miracles of Modern Science was formed at Princeton University by Josh Hirshfeld and Evan Younger, after the two met on Facebook in 2004 The duo experimented with a wide range of styles, from country to sea shanty, before arriving at their signature sound of indie rock blended with classical string quartet. They were later joined by Ledwidge and McDonald, and finally by drummer Tyler Pines in 2005, completing the band's lineup. Once assembled, the band played mostly at Princeton and in venues close by until they graduated. During this time, the band became known for wearing silver space suits during performances, although they have since discontinued the trend.

=== EP release (2008–2010) ===
After graduating from Princeton, MOMS moved to Brooklyn. In 2008, they released a self-titled EP, which they began recording while still in college and completed post-graduation. This album was critically well-received, with The Wheel's Still in Spin calling it the fourth best EP of 2008, Consequence of Sound giving a four and a half star review, and Wired News writing that MOMS play "consummate major-key space-pop that sounds like something new". Spin Magazine named the band one of the "25 Must-Hear Artists from the CMJ Festival" in October 2009.

=== Album release (2011 – present) ===
The band began recording their debut LP Dog Year in early 2010. WNYC premiered the lead single "Eating Me Alive" in August 2011, and the band released the album independently on December 6, 2011. Dog Year received critical acclaim upon release, including favorable reviews from Paste, Consequence of Sound, and Beats Per Minute, who also included Dog Year on their list of the top albums of 2011. Wired News included the track "Eating Me Alive" on their "Top 100 Songs of 2011" playlist. A live performance and interview with Audie Cornish on NPR's Weekend Edition the weekend after the album release earned the band national recognition.

In January 2011, Miracles of Modern Science released the parody video "Bon Joviver" (a portmanteau of Bon Jovi and Bon Iver) on YouTube. The video, in which the band performs an excerpt from Bon Jovi's "You Give Love a Bad Name" in the visual and musical style of Bon Iver, received considerable viral attention after being shared by The Huffington Post, BuzzFeed, and Bon Iver's Justin Vernon himself, among others.

Miracles of Modern Science released their second EP, MEEMS, in February 2013. The Guardian's music blog said its six songs "highlight talents becoming rarer and rarer to find in modern music". Younger wrote the lyrics to lead single "The Singularity" after becoming interested in Transhumanism and Artificial intelligence. The band gained further notoriety for their eccentric cover versions of popular songs, accompanied by humorous music videos. Their version of Daft Punk's "Get Lucky" received over 2 million views on YouTube and broadened the band's international fan base.

In August 2013, drummer Tyler Pines left the band, citing "other commitments and passions." He was soon replaced by Serge Terentev, a recent immigrant from Saint Petersburg, Russia whom the band found on Craigslist. Terentev accompanied MOMS on a tour supporting Norwegian recording artist Bernhoft and a performance at the Elle Style Awards in Istanbul, Turkey in December 2013.

== Discography ==
Albums

- Dog Year (2011)
- Mean Dreams (2015)

EPs

- Miracles of Modern Science (2008)
- MEEMS (2013)

Singles

- "Swipe" featuring Kristin Slipp (2014)
- "Funny Friend" featuring Soce, The Elemental Wizard (2013)
- "Art of Science" (2010)
- "I Found Space" (2010)
- "Bossa Supernova" (2009)
- “Swipe” (2014)
- “Birthday Cake” (2024)
