= Dreamy (Sarah Vaughan album) =

Studio album by Sarah Vaughan
- Released: April 19, 1960
- Genre: Vocal jazz
- Length: 36:33
- Label: Roulette
- Producer: Jimmy Jones

Sarah Vaughan chronology
Close to You (1960)	Dreamy (1960)	The Divine One (1960)

Dreamy is a 1960 studio album by American jazz singer Sarah Vaughan. This was Vaughan's first album for Roulette Records.

== Reception ==
Professional ratings
Review scores
Source	Rating
AllMusic	3/5 stars

The AllMusic review by Scott Yanow awarded Dreamy three stars and said that "The emphasis is on ballads on this Roulette LP...Harry 'Sweets' Edison contributes some soft melodic trumpet but the focus is very much on the singer...This is nice music that deserves to be reissued."

== Track listing ==
1. "Dreamy" (Sydney Shaw, Erroll Garner) - 2:56
2. "Hands Across the Table" (Mitchell Parish, Jean DeLettre) - 2:52
3. "The More I See You" (Mack Gordon, Harry Warren) - 3:06
4. "I'll Be Seeing You" (Irving Kahal, Sammy Fain) - 2:52
5. "Star Eyes" (Don Raye, Gene de Paul) - 2:58"
6. You've Changed" (Carl T. Fischer, Bill Carey) - 3:35
7. "Trees" (Oscar Rasbach, Joyce Kilmer) - 3:01
8. "Why Was I Born?" (Jerome Kern, Oscar Hammerstein II) - 2:29
9. "My Ideal" (Leo Robin, Richard A. Whiting, Newell Chase) - 2:56
10. "Crazy He Calls Me" (Bob Russell, Carl Sigman) - 3:08
11. "Stormy Weather" (Ted Koehler, Harold Arlen) - 3:28
12. "Moon Over Miami" (Joe Burke, Edgar Leslie) - 2:29

== Personnel ==
- Sarah Vaughan - vocal
- Harry "Sweets" Edison - trumpet
- Two unknown flutes
- Two unknown woodwinds
- Three unknown trombones
- Unknown string section
- Gerald Sanfino - flute, alto flute, alto saxophone
- Barry Galbraith - guitar
- Janet Soyer - harp
- Ronnell Bright – piano, celeste
- Richard Davis - double bass
- George Duvivier
- Percy Brice - drums
