= Star Eyes =

Studio album by Sarah Vaughan
- Released: September 1963
- Recorded: 1963
- Genre: Vocal jazz
- Length: 38:46
- Label: Roulette
- Producer: Henry Glover

Sarah Vaughan chronology
Sweet 'n' Sassy (1963)	Star Eyes (1963)	Sarah Slightly Classical (1963)

Professional ratings
Review scores
Source	Rating
AllMusic	3/5 stars
Record Mirror	4/5 stars

Star Eyes is a 1963 studio album by Sarah Vaughan, arranged by Marty Manning.

== Reception ==
The AllMusic review by Scott Yanow thought that "although nothing all that memorable occurs, Sassy's voice is heard very much in its prime".

== Track listing ==
1. "Star Eyes" (Gene de Paul, Don Raye) - 4:25
2. "Once Upon a Summertime" (Johnny Mercer, Eddie Barclay, Michel Legrand) - 2:45
3. "Don't Go to Strangers" (Redd Evans, Arthur Kent, David Mann) - 2:35
4. "Icy Stone" (Henry Glover, Morris Levy) - 2:52
5. "I Was Telling Him About You" (Morris Charlap, Don George) - 3:54
6. "I'll Never Be The Same" (Gus Kahn, Matty Malneck, Frank Signorelli) - 2:49
7. "Call Me Irresponsible" (Jimmy Van Heusen, Sammy Cahn) - 2:38
8. "Bewildered" (Leonard Whitcup, Teddy Powell) - 4:04
9. "Do You Remember" (J. Bailey, Levy) - 4:02
10. "There'll Be Other Times" (Marian McPartland, Margaret Jones) - 2:37
11. "Within Me I Know" (Duke Ellington, Sid Kuller) - 3:03
12. "As Long as He Needs Me" (Lionel Bart) - 3:12
13. "Enchanted Wall" (Unknown) - 3:12

== Personnel ==
- Sarah Vaughan - vocals
- Marty Manning - arranger, conductor
