= The Divine One =

Studio album by Sarah Vaughan
- Released: December 1960
- Recorded: October 11–13, 19, 1960
- Genre: Vocal jazz
- Length: 33:42
- Label: Roulette
- Producer: Teddy Reig

Sarah Vaughan chronology
Dreamy (1960)	The Divine One (1960)	My Heart Sings (1961)

The Divine One is a 1960 studio album by Sarah Vaughan, arranged by Jimmy Jones. One of Vaughan's first albums for Roulette Records, "The Divine One" was, along with "Sassy" a nickname for Vaughan.

== Reception ==
Professional ratings
Review scores
Source	Rating
Allmusic	4/5 stars

The Allmusic review by John Bush awarded the album four stars and said that "Recorded just after Sarah Vaughan joined the Roulette label...The Divine One found her in exactly the right circumstances to suit her excellent talents. Arranged by Jimmy Jones...the setting was a small group that included one strong voice to accentuate hers - and no less a strong and clear voice than trumpeter Harry "Sweets" Edison (the perfect accompaniment for Vaughan). Roulette would soon push Vaughan in many different directions – releasing over a dozen LPs in just a few short years – but this small-group date is a gem".

== Track listing ==
1. "Have You Met Miss Jones?" (Lorenz Hart, Richard Rodgers) – 2:21
2. "Ain't No Use" (Leroy Kirkland, Sidney Wyche) – 3:53
3. "Every Time I See You" (Hal Dickerson) – 3:01
4. "You Stepped Out of a Dream" (Nacio Herb Brown, Gus Kahn) – 2:20
5. "Gloomy Sunday" (Rezső Seress, László Jávor, Sam M. Lewis) – 3:26
6. "What Do You See in Her?" (Hal David, Frank Weldon) – 2:51
7. "Jump for Joy" (Duke Ellington, Sid Kuller, Paul Francis Webster) – 2:27
8. "When Your Lover Has Gone" (Einar Aaron Swan) – 2:18
9. "I'm Gonna Laugh You Out of My Life" (Cy Coleman, Joseph McCarthy) – 2:50
10. "Wrap Your Troubles in Dreams" (Harry Barris, Ted Koehler, Billy Moll) – 2:33
11. "Somebody Else's Dream" (Hal Dickenson) – 2:24
12. "Trouble Is a Man" (Alec Wilder) – 3:18

== Personnel ==
- Sarah Vaughan – vocal
- Harry "Sweets" Edison – trumpet
- Jimmy Jones – piano, arranger
- Don Lamond – drums

== See also ==
- Jazz royalty
