= Sweet 'n' Sassy =

Studio album by Sarah Vaughan
- Released: October 1964
- Recorded: 1963
- Studio: Universal (Chicago)
- Genre: Vocal jazz
- Length: 37:49
- Label: Roulette
- Producer: Teddy Reig

Sarah Vaughan chronology
The World of Sarah Vaughan (1963)	Sweet 'n' Sassy (1964)	Star Eyes (1963)

Sweet 'N' Sassy is a 1964 studio album by Sarah Vaughan, arranged by Lalo Schifrin.

== Reception ==
Professional ratings
Review scores
Source	Rating
Allmusic	3/5 stars
The Penguin Guide to Jazz Recordings	3/4 stars

The Allmusic review by Ronnie D. Lankford, Jr awarded the album three stars and said that "Surrounded by strings and syrupy arrangements, Vaughan brings her lovely voice to bear on a dozen standards...The album serves as the perfect late-evening album...Vaughan delivers an ethereal and relaxed collection that will please fans".

== Track listing ==
1. "I Didn't Know About You" (Duke Ellington, Bob Russell) - 3:46
2. "More Than You Know" (Edward Eliscu, Billy Rose, Vincent Youmans) - 3:38
3. "Thanks for the Ride" (Roy Alfred, Betty Ford) - 3:14
4. "Come Spring" (Alan Miller, Perry Stevens) - 2:23
5. "I Wish I Were in Love Again" (Lorenz Hart, Richard Rodgers) - 2:27
6. "Lazy Afternoon" (John La Touche, Jerome Moross) - 2:54
7. "Just Married Today" (Roy Alfred, Al Frisch) - 4:25
8. "Something I Dreamed Last Night" (Sammy Fain, Herb Magidson, Jack Yellen) - 4:45
9. "I Got Rhythm" (George Gershwin, Ira Gershwin) - 1:54
10. "This Can't Be Love" (Hart, Rodgers) - 1:39
11. "Slowly" (Kermit Goell, David Raksin) - 3:34
12. "Just You, Just Me" (Jesse Greer, Raymond Klages) - 2:12
13. "This Can't Be Love" (Hart, Rodgers) - 1:35

== Personnel ==
- Sarah Vaughan - vocals
- Lalo Schifrin - arranger, conductor
