= Goodnight My Love (1936 song) =

For other songs with this title, see Goodnight My Love (disambiguation)

"Goodnight My Love" is a popular song with music by Harry Revel and lyrics by Mack Gordon, published in 1936. It was incorporated in the 1936 movie Stowaway, where it is sung first by Shirley Temple and later by Alice Faye. Temple also sings part of the song as part of a medley in her 1938 film Rebecca of Sunnybrook Farm.

Popular recordings in 1937 were by Benny Goodman (vocal by Ella Fitzgerald), Shep Fields and Hal Kemp (vocal by Bob Allen).

== Selected other recordings ==
- Andy Russell - for the 78 rpm album Love Notes from Andy Russell (1947).
- Sarah Vaughan recorded the song for her album Sarah Vaughan in Hi-Fi (1955)
- Tina Louise recorded it for her one and only album, 1957's It's Time for Tina.
- Petula Clark also recorded it in 1957 for her debut studio album, You Are My Lucky Star.
- Dean Martin – for his album Sleep Warm (1959)
- Johnny Mathis – included in his album Johnny's Mood (1960)
- Ella Fitzgerald recorded it on her Capitol 1968 release, 30 by Ella.
