= Sarah Vaughan (1955 album) =

Studio album by Sarah Vaughan with Clifford Brown
- Released: 1955
- Recorded: December 18, 1954
- Studio: Fine Sound Studios, 711 Fifth Avenue, NYC
- Genre: Jazz
- Label: EmArcy
- Producer: Bob Shad

Sarah Vaughan chronology
The Divine Sarah Sings (1954)	Sarah Vaughan (1955)	In the Land of Hi-Fi (1955)

Sarah Vaughan, reissued in 1991 as Sarah Vaughan with Clifford Brown, is a 1955 jazz album featuring singer Sarah Vaughan and trumpeter Clifford Brown, released on the EmArcy label. It was the only collaboration between the two musicians. Well received, though not without some criticism, the album was Vaughan's own favorite among her works through 1980. The album was inducted into the Grammy Hall of Fame in 1999.

The album has been re-released on CD and LP many times, with its original nine-track listing and with an additional track.

== Critical reception ==
Professional ratings
Review scores
Source	Rating
Allmusic	5/5 stars
Penguin Guide to Jazz	👑

Sarah Vaughan was overwhelmingly a critical success. Contemporary critics were enthusiastic, with Billboard opining, "Here are nine examples of Sarah Vaughan's vocal gifts. Her individual phrasing, her highly distinctive mannerisms are in the grooves. [...] For the dealer with any jazz trade at all, this package is virtually a must."

The record's reputation has grown since its release. In Bebop: The Best Musicians and Recordings, jazz commentator Scott Yanow notes simply of the album that "[e]verything works," making of it an "essential acquisition." Ink Blot Magazine, characterizing this as one of Vaughan's "jazziest" albums, describes it also as one of her greatest. In its review, AllMusic states that "Vaughan is arguably in the best voice of her career here" and praises Brown for "displaying his incredible bop virtuosity," indicating that "[i]n whichever incarnation it's reissued, Sarah Vaughan With Clifford Brown is one of the most important jazz-meets-vocal sessions ever recorded." The Blackwell Guide to Recorded Jazz, also praising Brown's "brilliant" trumpeting, delves into Vaughan's vocal stylings in detail, encouraging listeners of the album to note how "sometimes she stretches out a song so deliberately and so reconfigures its melody, that the lyrics lose sense, linguistic phrasing having been replaced by musical phrasing." Blackwell author Barry Dean Kernfeld opines that "[i]t is perhaps this pure devotion to the exploration of sound that has made her such a favourite of jazz listeners." In Jazz: A Critic's Guide to the 100 Most Important Recordings, New York Times jazz commentator Ben Ratliff placed the album as among Vaughan's best, indicating that the recording session seemed among those blessed sessions where "even middle-level musicians can sound like gods." The Penguin Guide to Jazz selected this album as part of its suggested "Core Collection," stating "it is very difficult to find any flaw in what should be recognized as one of the great jazz vocal records," and awarded it "crown" status.

But even while praising the album, some critics found elements of fault. Ratliff expresses distaste for the album's "shizy moments, when...[Vaughan] rockets between hoity-toity...and so blues-singer earthy, in certain low-register moments, that she approaches vulgarity." A review in the music magazine Metronome at the time of its first release lamented: "Sarah sounds like an imitation of herself, sloppy, affected and so concerned with sound that she forgets that she is a singer, forgets the lyric of the song itself to indulge in sounds that are meaningless." Kernfeld suggests that Herbie Mann is a weak element amongst the otherwise strong ensemble, "completely overmatched," although The Penguin Guide to Jazz disagrees with this assessment.

== Track listing ==
1. "Lullaby of Birdland" (George Shearing, George David Weiss) – 4:06
2. "April in Paris" (Vernon Duke, E.Y. "Yip" Harburg) – 6:26
3. "He's My Guy" (Gene de Paul, Don Raye) – 4:17
4. "Jim" (Caesar Petrillo, Edward Ross, Nelson Shawn) – 5:56
5. "You're Not the Kind" (Will Hudson, Irving Mills) – 4:48
6. "Embraceable You" (George Gershwin, Ira Gershwin) – 4:54
7. "I'm Glad There Is You" (Jimmy Dorsey, Paul Mertz) – 5:14
8. "September Song" (Maxwell Anderson, Kurt Weill) – 5:50
9. "It's Crazy" (Al Fields, Timmie Rogers) – 5:01

== Personnel ==
=== Performance ===
- Sarah Vaughan – vocals
- Clifford Brown – trumpet
- Paul Quinichette – tenor saxophone
- Herbie Mann – flute
- Jimmy Jones – piano
- Joe Benjamin – bass
- Roy Haynes – drums
- Ernie Wilkins – conductor

=== Production ===
- Robert Appleton – reissue design
- Michael Bourne – liner notes
- William Claxton – photography
- Ken Druker – executive producer
- Ellen Fitton – reissue mastering
- Peter Keepnews – notes editing
- Hollis King – reissue art director
- Bryan Koniarz – reissue producer
- Kiyoshi "Boxman" Koyama – research
- Herman Leonard – reissue photography
- Paul Ramey – CD preparation
- Richard Seidel – CD preparation
- Bob Shad – producer
- Mark Smith – reissue production assistance
- Sherniece Smith – art coordinator
- Kiyoshi Tokiwa – remixing, research
- Michael Ullman – liner notes
- Ernie Wilkins – arranger
