= Snowbound (Sarah Vaughan album) =

Studio album by Sarah Vaughan
- Released: October 1962
- Recorded: 1962
- Genre: Vocal jazz
- Length: 54:43
- Label: Roulette
- Producer: Teddy Reig

Sarah Vaughan chronology
Sarah Sings Soulfully (1963)	Snowbound (1962)	We Three (1963)

Snowbound is a 1962 studio album by Sarah Vaughan, arranged by Don Costa.

== Reception ==
Professional ratings
Review scores
Source	Rating
Allmusic	4/5 stars
Record Mirror	4/5 stars

The Allmusic review by John Bush awarded the album four stars and said that "Despite the peaceful atmosphere and strolling tempo, Vaughan hardly treats the material as a cinch for her voice; all of these eleven songs find her searching for different ways to present timeworn standards...Snowbound is an overlooked gem from Sarah Vaughan's Roulette years".

== Track listing ==
1. "Snowbound" (Russell Faith, Clarence Kehner) - 3:07
2. "I Hadn't Anyone Till You" (Ray Noble) - 3:21
3. "What's Good About Goodbye?" (Harold Arlen, Leo Robin) - 3:02
4. "Stella by Starlight" (Ned Washington, Victor Young) - 2:55
5. "Look to Your Heart" (Sammy Cahn, Jimmy Van Heusen) - 3:40
6. "Oh, You Crazy Moon" (Johnny Burke, Van Heusen) - 3:43
7. "Blah Blah Blah" (George Gershwin, Ira Gershwin) - 2:40
8. "I Remember You" (Johnny Mercer, Victor Schertzinger) - 4:46
9. "I Fall in Love Too Easily" (Cahn, Jule Styne) - 3:20
10. "Glad to Be Unhappy" (Lorenz Hart, Richard Rodgers) - 4:11
11. "Spring Can Really Hang You Up the Most" (Fran Landesman, Tommy Wolf) - 3:45

== Personnel ==
- Sarah Vaughan - vocals
- Don Costa - arranger, conductor
