= My Heart Sings (Sarah Vaughan album) =

Studio album by Sarah Vaughan
- Released: 1961
- Label: Mercury

Sarah Vaughan chronology
The Divine One (1960)	My Heart Sings (1961)	Count Basie/Sarah Vaughan (1961)

Professional ratings
Review scores
Source	Rating
AllMusic	3/5 stars
Billboard	4/4 stars

My Heart Sings is a studio album by Sarah Vaughan released in 1961 on Mercury Records.

== Track listing ==
12-inch LP (Mercury – MG 20617, SR 60617)

Side 1
No.	Title	Length
1.	"Never in a Million Years"	2:28
2.	"My Ideal"	2:42
3.	"(All of a Sudden) My Heart Sings"	2:25
4.	"Through a Long and Sleepless Night"	2:22
5.	"Please"	2:26
6.	"Slow Down"	2:10

Side 2
No.	Title	Length
1.	"The House I Live In"	3:12
2.	"Our Waltz"	2:45
3.	"Some Other Spring"	2:28
4.	"Eternally"	2:20
5.	"Maybe It's Because (I Love You Too Much)"	2:33
6.	"Through the Years"	3:00
