= Sassy (album) =

Studio album by Sarah Vaughan
- Released: 1956
- Recorded: April 1956; New York City
- Genre: Jazz
- Label: EmArcy; MG 36089

Sarah Vaughan chronology
After Hours (1955)	Sassy (1956)	Swingin' Easy (1957)

Professional ratings
Review scores
Source	Rating
Billboard	positive ("Spotlight" pick)
AllMusic	3/5 stars

Sassy is an album by the American jazz vocalist Sarah Vaughan with Hal Mooney and his orchestra, recorded in 1956 and released on the EmArcy label.

== Track listing ==
1. "Lush Life" (Billy Strayhorn) – 3:56
2. "I'm The Girl" (James Shelton) – 2:02
3. "Shake Down The Stars" (Eddie DeLange, Jimmy Van Heusen) – 2:43
4. "I've Got Some Crying To Do" (Al Frisch, Sid Wayne) – 2:46
5. "My Romance" (Lorenz Hart, Richard Rodgers) – 3:11
6. "I Loved Him" (Cole Porter) – 3:12
7. "Lonely Woman" (Benny Carter, Ray Sonin) – 2:59
8. "Hey Naughty Papa" (Hoagy Carmichael) – 2:14
9. "I'm Afraid The Masquerade Is Over" (Herb Magidson, Allie Wrubel) – 3:24
10. "The Boy Next Door" (Ralph Blane, Hugh Martin) – 2:47
11. "Old Folks" (Dedette Lee Hill, Willard Robison) – 3:10
12. "Only You Can Say" (Frisch, Wayne) – 2:56
13. "A Sinner Kissed an Angel" (Mack David, Richard M. Jones, Ray Joseph) – 3:35

== Personnel ==
- Sarah Vaughan – vocals
- Orchestra arranged and conducted by Hal Mooney
