= Sarah Slightly Classical =

Studio album by Sarah Vaughan
- Released: 1963
- Recorded: May–July 1963
- Genre: Vocal jazz
- Length: 54:43
- Label: Roulette
- Producer: Henry Glover

Sarah Vaughan chronology
Star Eyes (1963)	Sarah Slightly Classical (1963)	The Lonely Hours (1964)

Sarah Slightly Classical is a 1963 studio album by Sarah Vaughan, arranged by Marty Manning.

== Reception ==
Professional ratings
Review scores
Source	Rating
AllMusic	3/5 stars

The AllMusic review by Scott Yanow says that "It has often been said that Sarah Vaughan had the voice to be an opera singer. This Roulette LP finds her coming as close as she ever did to performing in a classical vein. Listeners who enjoy hearing her scat and swing are advised to look elsewhere but others who like when Sassy goes a bit over the top and really stretches her voice will find this unusual effort quite enthralling."

== Track listing ==
1. "Be My Love" (Nicholas Brodszky, Sammy Cahn) - 3:45
2. "Intermezzo" (Robert Henning, Heinz Provost) - 4:25
3. "I Give to You" (Mary F. Manning, Johnny Lehmann) - 3:00
4. "Because" (Guy D'Hardelot, Edward Teschemacher) - 3:15
5. "Full Moon and Empty Arms" (Buddy Kaye, Ted Mossman) - 2:38
6. "My Reverie" (Larry Clinton, Claude Debussy) - 3:02
7. "Moonlight Love" (Mitchell Parish) - 4:00
8. "Ah! Sweet Mystery of Life" (Rida Johnson Young, Victor Herbert)

== Personnel ==
- Sarah Vaughan - vocals
- Marty Manning - arranger, conductor
