= Roy Turk =

American songwriter and lyricist

- Born: Roy Kenneth Turk; September 20, 1892; New York City, New York, United States
- Died: November 30, 1934 (aged 42); Hollywood, California, United States
- Occupations: Songwriter and lyricist
- Years active: 1920s–1930s
- Style: Traditional pop, cast recordings, show tunes, vaudeville, vocal music

Roy Kenneth Turk (September 20, 1892 – November 30, 1934) was an American songwriter and lyricist, who frequently collaborated with composer Fred E. Ahlert, with whom he wrote their popular 1929 song "Mean to Me", which became a jazz standard. In 1926 he collaborated with Lou Handman on his best known song, the 1927 hit Are You Lonesome Tonight?, which Elvis Presley later revived. He worked with many other composers, including for film lyrics. Turk was elected posthumously to the Songwriters Hall of Fame in 1970.

== Overview ==
Among his compositions (with music by Fred Ahlert unless otherwise noted):

- 1923 – "My Sweetie Went Away" (music by Lou Handman)
- 1927 – "Are You Lonesome Tonight?" (music by Lou Handman), popularized in 1960 by Elvis Presley
- 1928 – "I'll Get By (As Long as I Have You)"
- 1928 – "Mean to Me"
- 1931 – "I Don't Know Why (I Just Do)"
- 1931 – "Walkin' My Baby Back Home"
- 1931 – "Where the Blue of the Night (Meets the Gold of the Day)" for Bing Crosby
- 1932 – "Love, You Funny Thing!"

He also worked with composers such as Harry Akst, George W. Meyer, Charles Tobias, Arthur Johnston, Maceo Pinkard, and J. Russell Robinson.
