= Fred Ahlert =

American composer and songwriter (1892–1953)

- Born: Frederick Emil Ahlert; September 19, 1892; New York City, New York, United States
- Died: October 20, 1953 (aged 61); New York City, New York
- Occupations: Composer, lyricist, songwriter

Frederick Emil Ahlert (September 19, 1892 – October 20, 1953) was an American composer and songwriter.

== Early life ==
He received a degree from Fordham Law School, but instead of pursuing a legal career he began work as an arranger, initially for Irving Aaronson and his Commanders and then for composer and band-leader Fred Waring. Ahlert had his first hit song in 1920, and eventually started his own publishing company in 1928.

== Career ==
His songs have been recorded by numerous artists, including Louis Armstrong, Nat King Cole, Ella Fitzgerald, Thelonious Monk, Frank Sinatra, Moon Mullican, Dean Martin, Jerry Lee Lewis, Artie Shaw, and Fats Waller. Ahlert most frequently collaborated with lyricist Roy Turk, but he also wrote with others including Joe Young and Edgar Leslie.

Ahlert was inducted into the Songwriters Hall of Fame in 1970.

Ahlert was born in, and died in, New York City, where he lived all his life.

== Selected works ==
Among his compositions (with Roy Turk unless otherwise noted):

- "I Don't Know Why (I Just Do)"
- "I Wake Up Smiling" (with Edgar Leslie)
- "I'll Follow You"
- "I'll Get By (as Long as I Have You)"
- "I'm Gonna Sit Right Down and Write Myself a Letter" (with Joe Young)
- "Life is a Song" (with Joe Young)
- "Love, You Funny Thing!"
- "Mean to Me"
- "The Moon Was Yellow" (with Edgar Leslie)
- "Take My Heart" (with Joe Young)
- “There’s Frost on the Moon” (with Joe Young)
- "Walkin' My Baby Back Home"
- "Where Do You Keep Your Heart?" (with Al Stillman)
- "Where the Blue of the Night (Meets the Gold of the Day)"

== Family ==
Fred Ahlert and his wife, Mildred ("Millie") (c. 1894 Russia – 1955 New York City), had three sons:

1. Frederick Emil Ahlert, Jr. (16 February 1926, New York City; – 8 September 2005, San Francisco) was one of the last independent music publishers. He worked for the Leo Feist Agency until he started Fred Ahlert Music Group after the death of his father in 1953. In addition to his father's catalog, among the songwriters Fred Jr. represented were Ted Koehler, Irving Kahal, Walter Donaldson, Mort Dixon, Joe Burke, Edgar Leslie, John Jacob Loeb, Harold Stanley, Burt Bacharach and Hal David. Fred Jr. had two sons, Fred Emil Ahlert III (17 May 1958 – 21 April 2008), David, and a daughter named Katherine. BMG acquired Fred Ahlert Music in 2012.
2. Arnold Ahlert
3. Richard Ahlert (4 September 1921 – 9 August 1985 Scarsdale, New York) graduated from Juilliard when he was 17. He was a clarinetist and songwriter who composed over 1,000 songs, including the Broadway musical, Adam, for which his wife, June Tansey, wrote the book. He was a member of ASCAP and his songs included My Days of Loving You, recorded by Perry Como, and Running Out of Fools, recorded by Aretha Franklin.

Fred Ahlert had a brief prior marriage to Minnie Campbell. They were married October 17, 1912, in Manhattan, New York.
