= Brooks Bowman =

American composer (1913–1937)

Brooks Bowman (October 21, 1913 – October 17, 1937) was an American composer, songwriter, and lyricist who composed the song "East of the Sun (and West of the Moon)," which has become a jazz standard.

== Biography ==
A native of Cleveland, Ohio, he graduated from University School in that city, but had completed his first three years of preparatory school at Asheville School in Asheville, North Carolina. He then attended Stanford University for one year before transferring to Princeton University as a sophomore, in the fall of 1933. While an undergraduate student at Princeton he wrote the songs for the Princeton Triangle Club musical titled Stags at Bay in 1934, including "East of the Sun" (which almost didn't make it into the play due to a copyright dispute). Other songs he wrote for the show included "Love and a Dime" and "Will Love Find a Way?" For the Triangle Club production of 1936, he wrote What a Relief! which included the songs "Give Me a Gibson Girl," "Love Will Live On," "A Newspaper Picture of You," and "Then I Shan't Love You Anymore." He was also president of the Princeton Tower Club during his senior year.

Following his graduation from Princeton with the class of 1936, Bowman moved to California where, in 1937, he briefly worked under contract as a songwriter for Selznick International Pictures. Released from his contract in September 1937, he returned to the East where he formed a songwriting partnership, in which he would have been the lyricist, with a former Princeton classmate.

== Death ==
A New York music publisher offered the team a contract, but before it was signed Brooks Bowman died on October 17, 1937, when a car in which he was riding crashed into a stone wall on Cat Rock Road near Garrison, New York. Four days later, on October 21, he would have celebrated his 24th birthday.

He is buried in the family mausoleum at Grandview Cemetery in Salem, Ohio where his family moved while he was attending Princeton University.

== Sources ==
- Princeton University Archives
- Tribute to Brooks (in German)
