= Princeton Tigertones =

The Princeton Tigertones
- Also known as: The 'Tones
- Origin: Princeton, NJ
- Genre: Collegiate a cappella
- Years active: 1946–present
- Members: Niko "Tag" Salazar '27; Ishan "Dove" Saha '27; Andrew "Gatsby" Deschenes '27; Rishi "Speech" Kannan '27; William "Dog" Grimes '27; Alden "Ski" Vieira '27; Luke "Bliss" Steene '28; Raphael "Soul" Delgado '28; Bryan "Float" Carmichael '28; Max "Rigor" Mathias '28; Luke "Java" Hathaway '28; Alex "Spritz" Cross '29; Bolun "Bond" Tan '29; Noah Cohen '30; Will Ekrem '30; Lincoln Eyer '30; Pierre Nordenson '30
- Website: http://www.tigertones.com

The Princeton Tigertones are an internationally known all-male collegiate a cappella group from Princeton University. The group was founded in 1946, and since then has produced thirty-two albums. The Tigertones, known informally as "The 'Tones", draw from a repertoire of nearly a hundred songs that have been arranged exclusively by members of the group, and which range in genre from traditional choral arrangements to barbershop quartet standards, modern jazz, the "American songbook", and contemporary pop culture hits.

In addition to extensive performing on Princeton's campus, the group frequently tours the United States and the world, and has traveled across the United States, Europe, and Asia to perform in such storied venues as New York City's Carnegie Hall, London's Barbican Centre, and aboard Cunard Line's Queen Elizabeth 2. The Tigertones have performed before heads of state including President Bill Clinton and the late Yitzhak Rabin, and, in 2010, performed three times at the White House for an audience including President Barack Obama and First Lady Michelle Obama.

The Tigertones have been profiled in dozens of publications, including a 1995 article in Rolling Stone and Life magazine. They are historically notable for being the first collegiate a cappella group to release an album in compact disc format (1989's "Ba Da Ya Ba Da.") and the first collegiate a cappella group to have a page on the World Wide Web, dating from March 1994.

== History ==
Founded in 1946 by a group of undergraduates seeking an alternative to the existing opportunities for vocal performance on campus, the Tigertones were originally organized by Henry G. Parker '48 and found quick and enduring success. The group's inaugural arrangement was the barbershop quartet standard "Coney Island Baby", and other early arrangements included Irving Berlin's Alexander's Ragtime Band and a Princeton University anthem known as "The Orange Moon."

In addition to becoming a staple at formal parties at the Seven Sisters, the Tigertones began international touring in the 1950s with repeated visits to Bermuda. They appeared for several years running alongside The Talbot Brothers of Bermuda, and adapted some calypso tunes for the repertoire.

The tradition of the biennial World Tour was inaugurated in 1987 with a transatlantic voyage that included stops from Britain to Greece; the group has completed eleven such tours that have included performances at the US Embassies in Paris, Madrid, Tokyo, and Tel Aviv, as well as the U.S. Consulate in Geneva.

== Repertoire ==
The Tigertones draw from a repertoire of nearly a hundred songs that have been arranged almost exclusively by members of the group. While songs have been arranged since the group's mid-century inception, many songs "die" from the active repertoire to make way for new arrangements. As a result, the most successful and well-arranged songs from each generation remain with the group as it progresses forward, leaving the undergraduate group with a repertoire of songs representing all decades in fairly equal proportions.

The most performed of these songs is probably the Tigertones' arrangement of "Shower the People" by James Taylor.

== Performances and tours ==
The Tigertones sing regularly for private parties, corporate-sponsored events, and charity functions primarily in the Northeast (NYC, Philadelphia, Boston). Several times a year, they embark on week-long tours that take them to domestic locations (San Francisco, Orlando, Atlanta) and abroad (Bermuda, Japan, UAE, China and the United Kingdom).

The Tigertones performed for President Barack Obama and First Lady Michelle Obama at the White House holiday parties of 2010 and 2011.

== Attire ==
The Tigertones perform at events ranging from the ultra-informal ("arch sings" in the arches on Princeton's campus) to the very formal (Carnegie Hall, American Embassy in Tokyo). As a result, the Tigertones have adopted several styles of performance attire, the most notable being "Coat and Tie" (a blue blazer, khaki pants, and tie; medium formality and the most common) and the Tigertones' signature "DJ" (a full tuxedo with white dinner jacket, reserved only for important performances, and the attire used for publicity photos and CD inserts).

== Notable alumni ==
- Hutch Parker: Film executive
- Andrew Jarecki: Executive and co-founder of 777-FILM
- Wentworth Miller: Actor, screenwriter
- William R. Cline: Economist
- Steven Colloton: Judge on the U.S. Court of Appeals for the Eighth Circuit

== Fictional and literary appearances ==
Geoffrey Wolff's memoir Duke of Deception describes some of his experiences as a member of the Tigertones.

The character Paul Kinsey on the popular television series "Mad Men" was a Tigertone.
