= 20th-century domes =

Domes built in the 20th century benefited from more efficient techniques for iron production and steel production, as well as advances in structural analysis. In the 20th century, planetarium domes spurred the invention by Walther Bauersfeld of both thin shells of reinforced concrete and geodesic domes. The use of steel, computers, and finite element analysis enabled yet larger spans. Tension membrane structure became popular for domed sports stadiums, which also innovated with rigid retractable domed roofs.

== Developments ==
Graphical equilibrium analysis was used in America at the beginning of the 20th century to check the designs of domed structures, such as St. Paul's Chapel at Columbia University and the vaults of Spanish architect Guastavino.

American state capitol domes built in the twentieth century include those of Arizona, Mississippi, Pennsylvania, Wisconsin, Idaho, Kentucky, Utah, Washington, Missouri, and West Virginia. The West Virginia capitol building has been called the last American Renaissance capitol.

Early Modernist architecture, characterized by "geometrization of architectural detail", includes the domed Greek Catholic parish churches of Čemerné (1905–1907) and Jakubany (1911) in Slovakia. The monumental domes of the Greek Catholic Basilian complex in Zhovkva (1901–1906), Transfiguration Church of Jarosław in Jarosław, Poland, (1902–1907), and the Church of St. Michael the Archangel in Surochów, Poland, (1912–1914) also have simplified geometry that attempt to blend traditional and modern styles, an effort interrupted by World War I and the breakup of the Habsburg monarchy.

Wooden domes in thin-wall shells on ribs were made until the 1930s. After World War II, steel and wooden laminate structural members made with waterproof resorcinol glues were used to create domes with grid-patterned wooden support structures, such as the 100-meter-diameter (330 ft) Skydome in Flagstaff, Arizona. Glued laminated wooden structures were also used in 1983 to create the 160-meter (520 ft) Tacoma Dome, in 1990 to create the 160-meter (520 ft) Superior Dome, and in 1997 to create the 178-meter (584 ft) Nipro Hachiko Dome.

Stand-alone dome structures were used to house public utility facilities in the 20th century. The "Fitzpatrick dome", designed by John Fitzpatrick as an inexpensive structure to store winter road service sand and salt, has been used in countries around the world. The first was built in 1968. The domes have twenty sides and are normally 30 metres (100 ft) in diameter and a little more than 15 metres (50 ft) tall. The conical shape is meant to conform to the 45 degree slope of a pile of wet sand. They are built on concrete footings and covered with asphalt shingles.

In the second half of the twentieth century, study of domes increased with the application of limit analysis and elastic analysis to models. Beginning in 1967, Professor Jacques Heyman applied limit analysis to the traditional technique of analyzing domes along the arches created by cutting the structure with meridian planes. He published studies analyzing dome collapse and cracking patterns. Limit analysis, which models domes in a simplified manner as a kinematic chain of rigid blocks, was often used to study the collapse of masonry domes under various conditions of load, shape, and structural features. The analysis assumed "infinite compressive strength, infinite sliding strength and tensile strength equal to zero" for masonry domes. Elastic analysis uses more refined models to perform three-dimensional membrane analysis of the distribution of stresses in domes with various shapes, loads, and boundary conditions. It models masonry as composed of either isotropic or orthotropic materials and takes block arrangement and mortar joints into account.

== Guastavino tile ==
The Guastavino family, a father and son team who worked on the eastern seaboard of the United States, built vaults using layers of tiles in hundreds of buildings in the late 19th and early 20th centuries, including the domes of the Basilica of St. Lawrence in Asheville, North Carolina, and St. Francis de Sales Roman Catholic Church in Philadelphia, Pennsylvania. The dome over the crossing of the Cathedral of St. John the Divine in New York City was built by the son in 1909. A part-spherical dome, it measures 30 meters in diameter from the top of its merging pendentives, where steel rods embedded in concrete act as a restraining ring. With an average thickness 1/250th of its span, and steel rods also embedded within the pendentives, the dome "looked forward to modern shell construction in reinforced concrete."

== Reinforced concrete ==
Domes built with steel and concrete were able to achieve very large spans. The 1911 dome of the Melbourne Public Library reading room, presumably inspired by the British Museum, had a diameter of 31.5 meters and was briefly the widest reinforced concrete dome in the world until the completion of the Centennial Hall. The Centennial Hall was built with reinforced concrete in Breslau, Germany (today Poland), from 1911–13 to commemorate the 100-year anniversary of the uprising against Napoleon. With a 213-foot-wide (65 m) central dome surrounded by stepped rings of vertical windows, it was the largest building of its kind in the world. Other examples of ribbed domes made entirely of reinforced concrete include the Methodist Hall in Westminster, London, the Augsburg Synagogue, and the Orpheum Theater in Bochum. The 1928 Leipzig Market Hall by Deschinger and Ritter featured two 82-meter-wide (269 ft) domes.

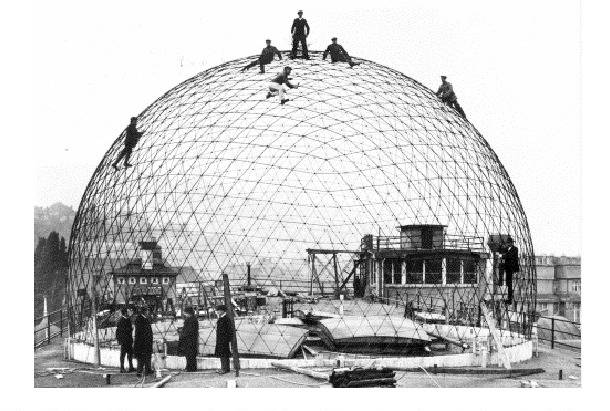
Geodesic dome under construction in Jena.

The thin domical shell was further developed with the construction of two domes in Jena, Germany in the early 1920s. To build a rigid planetarium dome, Walther Bauersfeld constructed a triangulated frame of light steel bars and mesh with a domed formwork suspended below it. By spraying a thin layer of concrete onto both the formwork and the frame, he created a 16-meter-wide (52 ft) dome that was just 30 millimeters thick. The second dome was still thinner at 40 meters wide and 60 millimeters thick. These are generally taken to be the first modern architectural thin shells. These are also considered the first geodesic domes. Beginning with one for the Deutsches Museum in Munich, 15 domed projection planetariums using concrete shells up to 30 meters wide had been built in Europe by 1930, and that year the Adler Planetarium in Chicago became the first planetarium to open in the Western Hemisphere. Planetarium domes required a hemispherical surface for their projections, but most 20th century shell domes were shallow to reduce the material costs, simplify construction, and reduce the volume of air needing to be heated.

In India, the Viceroy's House in New Delhi was designed in 1912–1913 by Edwin Lutyens with a dome.

Although an equation for the bending theory of a thick spherical shell had been published in 1912, based on general equations from 1888, it was too complex for practical design work. A simplified and more approximate theory for domes was published in 1926 in Berlin. The theory was tested using sheet metal models with the conclusion that the membrane stresses in domes are small with little reinforcement required, especially at the top, where openings could be cut for light. Only the concentrated stresses at point supports required heavy reinforcement. Early examples used a relatively thick bordering girder to stabilize exposed edges. Alternative stabilization techniques include adding a bend at these edges to stiffen them or increasing the thickness of the shell itself at the edges and near the supports. In 1933–34, Spanish engineer-architect Eduardo Torroja, with Manuel Sanchez, designed the Market Hall in Algeciras, Spain, with a thin shell concrete dome. The shallow dome is 48 meters wide, 9 centimeters thick, and supported at points around its perimeter. The indoor stadium for the 1936 Olympic Games in Berlin used an oval dome of concrete shell 35 meters wide and 45 meters long.

The use of metal structures in Italy was reduced in the first half of the 20th century by autarchy and the demands of the world wars. Steel became broadly used in building construction in the 1930s. A shortage of steel following World War II and the demonstrated vulnerability of exposed steel to damage from intense fires during the war may have contributed to the popularity of concrete architectural shells beginning in the late 1940s. In the 1960s, improvements in welding and bolting techniques and higher labor costs made steel frames more economical.

In 1940, California architect Wallace Neff built a 30-metre (98 ft) dome using an inflated balloon of sailcloth as formwork. The balloon was made airtight by wetting, inflated, then supported steel reinforcement as concrete was sprayed onto it in layers. This technique was used to build "bubble houses" in Florida.

After World War II, reinforced concrete was used in dome reconstruction in Palermo, Sicily, because it was quick, strong, economical, and readily available. Examples include Church of the Gesù, Sant'Ignazio all'Olivella, and Santissimo Salvatore.

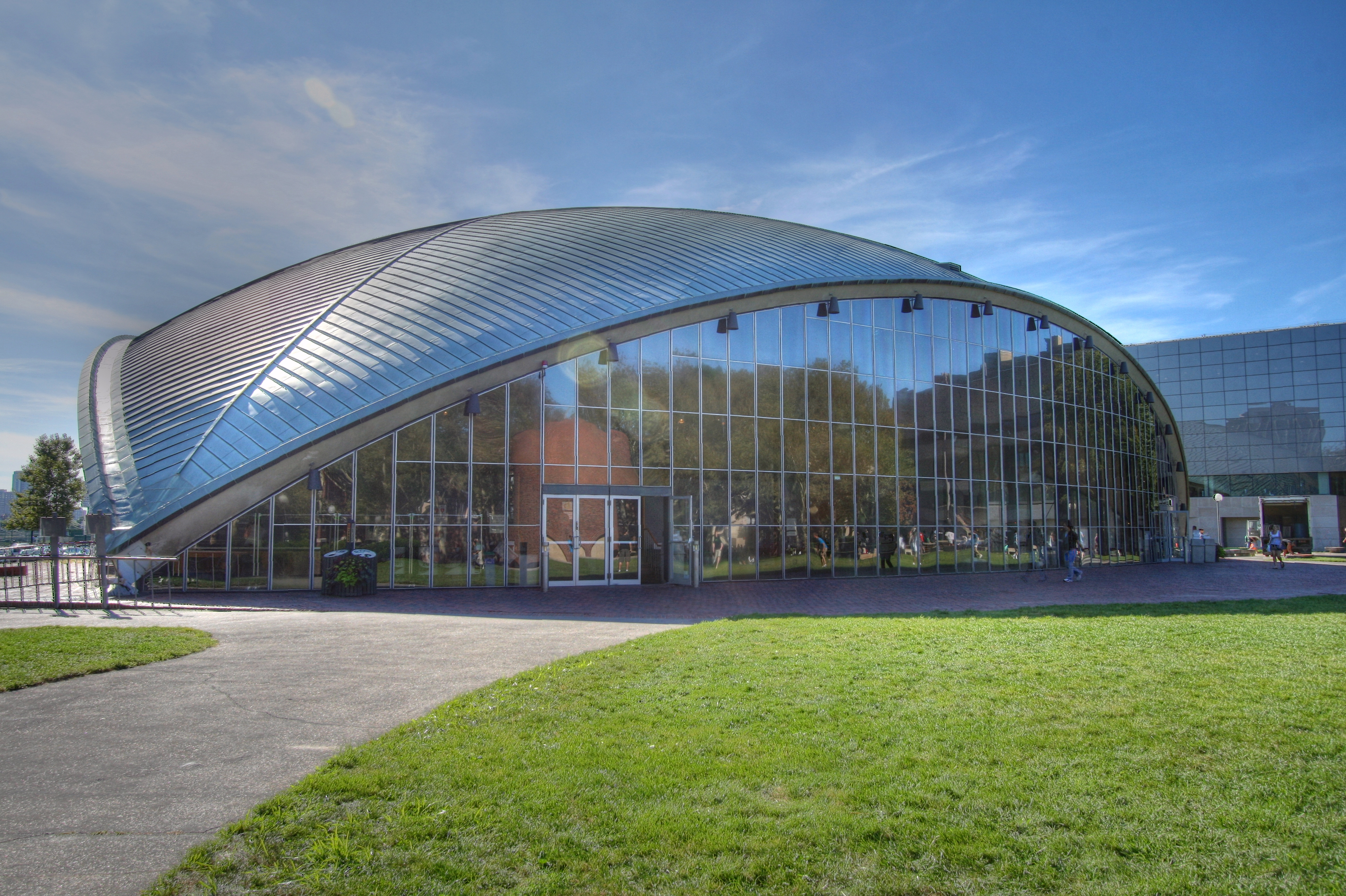
The Kresge Auditorium in Massachusetts.

Popularized by a 1955 article on the work of Félix Candela in Mexico, architectural shells had their heyday in the 1950s and 1960s, peaking in popularity shortly before the widespread adoption of computers and the finite element method of structural analysis. Notable examples of domes include the Kresge Auditorium at MIT, which has a spherical shell 49 meters wide and 89 millimeters thick, and the Palazzetto dello Sport, with a 59-meter-wide (194 ft) dome designed by Pier Luigi Nervi.

Built from 1955 to 1957, the prestressed concrete dome of the main exhibition hall of the Belgrade Fair has a span of 106 meters. It was designed by Branko Žeželj, using a pre-stressing system developed by him, and was the largest dome in the world until 1965. It remains the largest dome in Europe.

In the 1960s, Italian architect Dante Bini developed an inflatable formwork system using a nylon-reinforced neoprene spherical balloon. First, a concrete floor slab and ring beam was poured. The ring beam included voids for air inlets and outlets and an inflatable tube that held the balloon membrane in place. The balloon was laid out uninflated over the floor slab and secured at the ring beam, reinforcement bars spaced with springs were laid on top, the concrete was applied, an outer membrane of PVC was laid over the concrete, then the balloon was inflated and lifted the material into the dome shape. After inflation, the concrete was vibrated using rolling carts attached to cables. After drying, the balloon could be removed and openings for door or windows could be cut out of the dome. This "Binishell" system was used to build over 1,500 elliptical-section domes in countries around the world between 1970 and 1990, with diameters between 12 and 36 meters. Examples include the Edinburgh Sports Dome in Malvern (1977) and a project at Sydney's Ashbury School.

The dome of the Church of the Holy Sepulchre in Jerusalem experienced an earthquake in 1927, a fire in 1934, and a fire in 1949, which partially destroyed its lead roof. In 1977 it was decided to renovate the dome to better resist earthquakes and fire. A British team of contractors used steel connectors to attach a 115 millimeter thick reinforced concrete dome shell to the outside of the 1870 wrought iron arches. They reduced the dome's total weight by 100 tons, so that either the shell or the arches could each support the total weight of the dome independently of the other. No flammable materials were used. The exterior was covered in traditional hand-finished lead sheeting. The interior was covered with a 25 millimeter thick layer of plaster attached to the wrought iron arches with a metal mesh.

== Reticular and geodesic domes ==
The West Baden Springs Hotel in Indiana was built in 1903 with the largest span dome in the world at 61 metres (200 ft). Its metal and glass skin was supported by steel trusses resting on metal rollers to allow for expansion and contraction from temperature changes. It was surpassed in span by the Centennial Hall of Max Berg.

Structurally, geodesic domes are considered shells when the loads are borne by the surface polygons, as in the Kaiser Dome, but are considered space grid structures when the loads are borne by point-to-point members. A geodesic dome made of welded steel tubes was made in 1935 for the aviary of the Rome Zoo. Aluminum reticular domes allow for large dimensions and short building times, suitable for sports arenas, exhibition centers, auditoriums, or storage facilities. The Dome of Discovery exhibition hall was built in London in 1951. It was the largest domed building in the world at the time, 111 metres (365 ft) wide. Other aluminum domes include the 61-meter-wide (200 ft) "Palasport" in Paris (1959) and the 125-meter-wide (410 ft) "Spruce Goose Dome" in Long Beach, California.

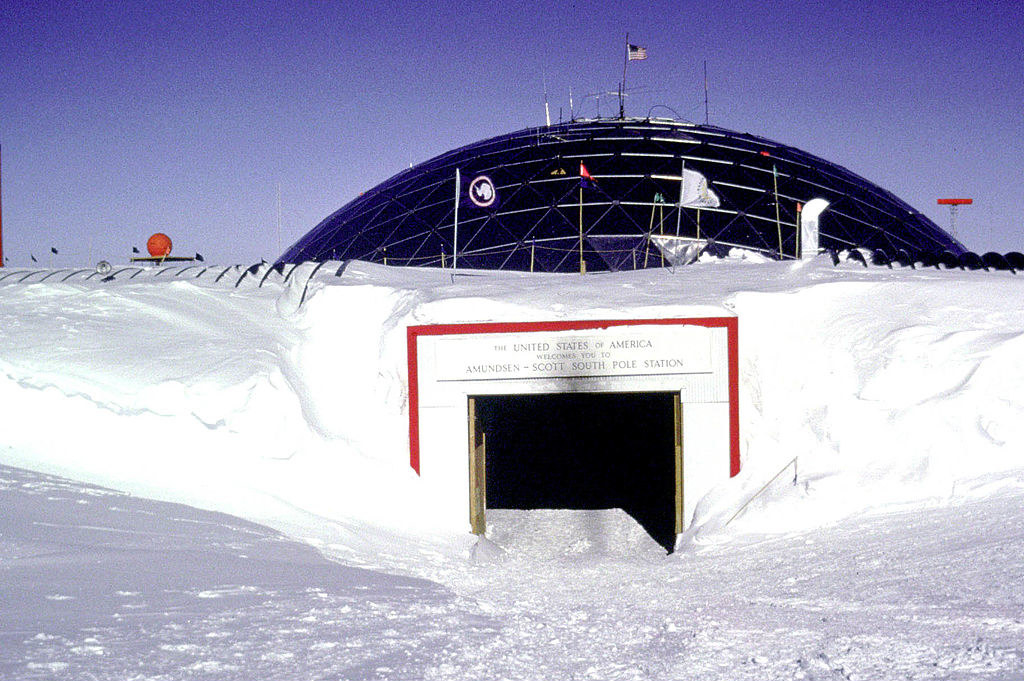
The Amundsen-Scott South Pole Station in Antarctica.

Although the first examples were built 25 years earlier by Walther Bauersfeld, the term "geodesic domes" was coined by Buckminster Fuller, who received a patent for them in 1954. Geodesic domes have been used for radar enclosures, greenhouses, housing, and weather stations. Early examples in the United States include a 16-metre (53 ft) dome for the Ford Rotunda in 1953 and a 117-metre (384 ft) diameter dome for the Baton Rouge facility of the Union Tank Car Company in 1958, the largest clear-span structure in the world at that time. The U.S. Pavilion at Expo 67 in Montreal, Quebec, Canada, was enclosed by a 76.5-meter-wide and 60-meter-tall dome made of steel pipes and acrylic panels. It is used today as a water monitoring center. Other examples include the Amundsen-Scott South Pole Station, which was used from 1975 to 2003, and the Eden Project in the UK, built in 2000.

"Grid-domes", using a structural grid of roughly orthogonal members adjusted to create a double-curved surface, were employed in 1989 to create a double-glazed glass dome over an indoor swimming pool in Neckarsulm, Germany, and a single-glazed glass dome over the courtyard of the Museum for Hamburg History in Hamburg, Germany.

The 167-meter (548 ft) Osaka Dome and the 187-meter (614 ft) Nagoya Dome were completed in 1997.

== Tension and membranes ==
Tensegrity domes, patented by Buckminster Fuller in 1962 from a concept by Kenneth Snelson, are membrane structures consisting of radial trusses made from steel cables under tension with vertical steel pipes spreading the cables into the truss form. They have been made circular, elliptical, and other shapes to cover stadiums from Korea to Florida. While the first permanent air supported membrane domes were the radar domes designed and built by Walter Bird after World War II, the temporary membrane structure designed by David Geiger to cover the United States pavilion at Expo '70 was a landmark construction. Geiger's solution to a 90% reduction in the budget for the pavilion project was a "low profile cable-restrained, air-supported roof employing a superelliptical perimeter compression ring". Its very low cost led to the development of permanent versions using teflon-coated fiberglass and within 15 years the majority of the domed stadiums around the world used this system, including the 1975 Silverdome (168 meters) in Pontiac, Michigan. Other examples include the 1982 Hubert H. Humphrey Metrodome (180 meters), the 1983 BC Place (190 meters), and the 1988 Tokyo Dome (201 meters). The restraining cables of such domes are laid diagonally to avoid the sagging perimeter found to occur with a standard grid.

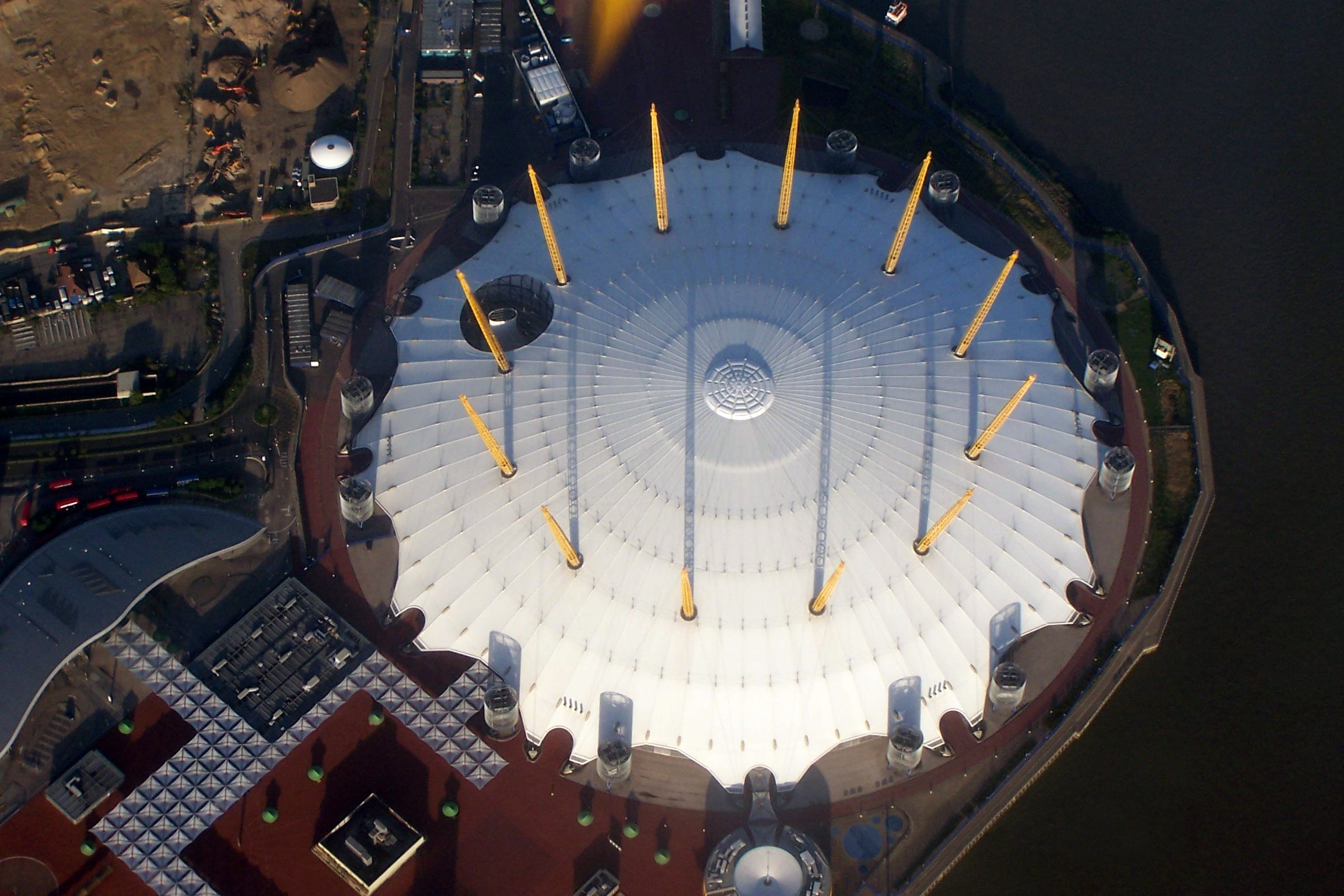
The Millennium Dome in London

Tension membrane design has depended upon computers, and the increasing availability of powerful computers resulted in many developments being made in the last three decades of the 20th century. Weather-related deflations of some air-supported roofs led David Geiger to develop a modified type, the more rigid "Cabledome", that incorporated Fuller's ideas of tensegrity and aspension rather than being air-supported. The example he built in St. Petersburg, Florida spans 230 meters. The pleated effect seen in some of these domes is the result of lower radial cables stretching between those forming trusses in order to keep the membrane in tension. The lightweight membrane system used consists of four layers: waterproof fiberglass on the outside, insulation, a vapor barrier, then an acoustic insulation layer. This is semitransparent enough to fulfill most daytime lighting needs beneath the dome. The first large span examples were two Seoul, South Korea, sports arenas built in 1986 for the Olympics, one 93 meters wide and the other 120 meters wide. The Georgia Dome, built in 1992 on an oval plan, uses instead a triangulated pattern in a system patented as the "Tenstar Dome". In Japan, the Izumo Dome was built in 1992 with a height of 49 meters and a diameter of 143 meters. It uses a PTFE-coated glass fiber fabric. The first cable dome to use rigid steel frame panels as roofing instead of a translucent membrane was begun for an athletic center in North Carolina in 1994. The Millennium Dome was completed as the largest cable dome in the world with a diameter of 320 meters and uses a different system of membrane support, with cables extending down from the 12 masts that penetrate the membrane.

== Retractable domes and stadiums ==
The higher expense of rigid large span domes made them relatively rare, although rigidly moving panels is the most popular system for sports stadiums with retractable roofing. With a span of 126 meters, Pittsburgh's Civic Arena featured the largest retractable dome in the world when completed for the city's Civic Light Opera in 1961. Six of its eight sections could rotate behind the other two within three minutes, and in 1967 it became the home of the Pittsburgh Penguins hockey team.

The Assembly Hall arena at the University of Illinois Urbana-Champaign was completed in 1963 with a concrete saucer dome spanning 120 metres (400 ft). The edge of the dome was post-tensioned with more than 600 miles of steel cable. The first domed baseball stadium, the Astrodome in Houston, Texas, was completed in 1965 with a rigid 641-foot-wide (195 m) steel dome filled with 4,596 skylights. Other early examples of rigid stadium domes include the steel frame Superdome of New Orleans and the cement Kingdome of Seattle. The Louisiana Superdome has a span of 207 meters. Stockholm's 1989 Ericsson Globe, an arena for ice hockey, earned the title of largest hemispherical building in the world with a diameter of 110 meters and height of 85 meters.

Montreal's Olympic Stadium featured a retractable membrane roof in 1988, although repeated tearing led to its replacement with a non-retractable roof. The SkyDome of Toronto opened in 1989 with a rigid system in four parts: one that is fixed, two that slide horizontally, and one that rotates along the edge of the 213-meter-wide (699 ft) span. In Japan, the 1993 Fukuoka Dome featured a 222-meter dome in three parts, two of which rotated under the third.

== Bibliography ==
- The APWA Reporter, Volumes 39–40, American Public Works Association, 1972
- Barnes, Michael R.; Dickson, Michael (2000). "Preface and Overview: The Evolution of Longspan Lightweight Structures". In Barnes, Michael R.; Dickson, Michael (eds.). Widespan Roof Structures (illustrated ed.). Thomas Telford. ISBN 978-0-727-72877-7.
- Bradshaw, Richard; Campbell, David; Gargari, Mousa; Mirmiran, Amir; Tripeny, Patrick (June 1, 2002). "Special Structures: Past, Present, and Future" (PDF). Journal of Structural Engineering. 128 (6). Madrid: American Society of Civil Engineers (ASCE): 691–709. doi:10.1061/(ASCE)0733-9445(2002)128:6(691).
- Cadbury-Brown, H.T. (2001). "'A Good Time-and-a-Half Was Had by All'". Twentieth Century Architecture (5). Great Britain: The Twentieth Century Society: 1–24. JSTOR 41861909.
- Charlier, Claude (1988), "After a While, Nothing Seems Strange in a Stadium with a 'Lid'", Smithsonian
- Cohn, Morris Mandel; Fleming, Rodney R., eds. (1974), Managing Snow Removal and Ice Control Programs: A Practical Guide to the How, When, where and why of Effective Public Work Practices. Issue 42 of Special report (American Public Works Association), American Public Works Association
- Cottone, Antonio; Bertorotta, Simona (2009), "New Domes for Old Churches (Palermo 1943)" (PDF), Proceedings of the Third International Congress on Construction History, vol. 1, Cottbus, Germany
- Cowan, Henry J. (1977). "A History of Masonry and Concrete Domes in Building Construction". Building and Environment. 12 (1). Great Britain: Pergamon Press: 1–24. Bibcode:1977BuEnv..12....1C. doi:10.1016/0360-1323(77)90002-6. hdl:2027/mdp.39015041999635.
- Cowan, Henry J. (1983). "Domes: Ancient and Modern". Journal of the Royal Society of Arts. 131 (5320). Royal Society for the Encouragement of Arts, Manufactures and Commerce: 181–198. JSTOR 41373544.
- Fairley, Grant D. (2019). Up to the Cottage: Memories of Muskoka. Lulu Press, Inc. ISBN 978-1-329-27064-0.
- Freeman-Grenville, G. S. P. (1987). "The Basilica of the Holy Sepulchre, Jerusalem: History and Future". The Journal of the Royal Asiatic Society of Great Britain and Ireland. 119 (2). Cambridge University Press: 187–207. doi:10.1017/S0035869X00140614. JSTOR 25212148.
- Friedman, Noémi; Farkas, György (2011). "Roof Structures in Motion: On Retractable and Deployable Roof Structures Enabling Quick Construction or Adaptation to External Excitations" (PDF). Concrete Structures. pp. 41–50. Archived from the original (PDF) on 2013-05-14.
- Glenday, Craig, ed. (2008). Guinness World Records 2008. Bantam Books. ISBN 978-0-553-58995-5.
- Hourihane, Colum, ed. (2012). The Grove Encyclopedia of Medieval Art and Architecture. Oxford University Press. ISBN 978-0-19-539536-5.
- Huerta, Santigo (2001). "Mechanics of masonry vaults: The equilibrium approach" (PDF). In Lourenço, Paulo B.; Roca, Pere (eds.). Historical Constructions 2001: possibilities of numerical and experimental techniques: proceedings of the 3rd International Seminar. Guimarães: University of Minho. pp. 47–69. ISBN 972-8692-01-3.
- Huerta, Santiago (2008). "The analysis of masonry architecture: A historical approach: To the memory of professor Henry J. Cowan" (PDF). Architectural Science Review. 51 (4). University of Sydney: 297–328. doi:10.3763/asre.2008.5136.
- Jelica, Mirjana; Sedmak, Aleksandar (2020). "The Largest Pre-stressed Concrete Dome in the World – the Case Study of "Hall 1 of the Belgrade Fair"". Procedia Structural Integrity. 28. Elsevier B.V.: 1833–1838. doi:10.1016/j.prostr.2020.11.006. S2CID 229615052.
- Kádár, Bálint (2011). "World Exhibitions as Laboratories for Structural Innovation". Periodica Polytechnica Architecture. 42 (1). Budapest University of Technology and Economics: 23–31. doi:10.3311/pp.ar.2011-1.03.
- King, Julia (2000), "The American Dome: Symbol of Democracy", Domes. Papers Read at the Annual Symposium of the Society of Architectural Historians of Great Britain., Society of Architectural Historians of Great Britain, pp. 83–98, archived from the original on 2021-09-04
- Krasny, Piotr (2003). "Architecture of the Ruthenian Greek Catholic Church in the Habsburg Monarchy ca. 1770-1914" (PDF). Centropa. A Journal of Central European Architecture and Related Arts. 3 (3): 194–207.
- Langmead, Donald; Garnaut, Christine (2001). Encyclopedia of Architectural and Engineering Feats (3rd ed.). ABC-CLIO. ISBN 978-1-57607-112-0.
- Levy, Matthys; Salvadori, Mario (2002). Why buildings Fall Down: How Structures Fail (illustrated, reprint ed.). W. W. Norton & Company. ISBN 978-0-393-31152-5.
- Mainstone, Rowland J. (2001). Developments in Structural Form (2nd ed.). Architectural Press. ISBN 978-0-7506-5451-7.
- Marche, Jordan (2005). Theaters of Time and Space: American Planetaria, 1930–1970. Rutgers University Press. ISBN 978-0-813-53766-5.
- McLean, Will (2013). "Skill: Inflatable Concrete Domes". Architectural Review. EMAP Publishing Ltd.
- Misztal, Barbara (2017). Wooden Domes: History and Modern Times. Springer. ISBN 978-3-319-65741-7.
- Mitchell, James H. (1985). "The Noble Dome". The Antioch Review. 43 (3). Antioch Review, Inc.: 261–271. doi:10.2307/4611482. JSTOR 4611482.
- Morganti, R.; Tosone, A.; Abita, M.; Di Donato, D. (2019), "Symbol and technique of steel domes in Italy", in Cruz, Paulo J.S. (ed.), Structures and Architecture – Bridging the Gap and Crossing Borders: Proceedings of the Fourth International Conference on Structures and Architecture (ICSA 2019), July 24–26, 2019, Lisbon, Portugal, CRC Press, pp. 835–842, ISBN 978-1-351-85815-1
- Muttoni, Aurelio (2011). The Art of Structures. EPFL Press. ISBN 978-2-940-22238-4.
- Nenadović, Aleksandra (2010). "Development, Characteristics and Comparative Structural Analysis of Tensegrity Type Cable Domes" (PDF). Spatium. 22 (22): 57–66. doi:10.2298/spat1022057n.
- Ochsendork, John; Freeman, Michael (2010). Guastavino Vaulting: The Art of Structural Tile (illustrated ed.). Princeton Architectural Press. ISBN 978-1-56898-741-5.
- Pavlovic, Milorad; Reccia, Emanuele; Cecchi, Antonella (2014), "Limit analysis of masonry domes: the case of Hagia Sophia and Anime Sante", Conference: MONUBASIN – 9th International Symposium on the Conservation of Monuments in the Mediterrean Basin, Ankara, Turkey
- Perkin, George, ed. (1981). "Jerusalem Dome". Concrete Quarterly. July–Sept (130). Cement and Concrete Association: 10–11.
- Petroski, Henry (2011). "Engineering: Arches and Domes". American Scientist. 99 (2). Sigma Xi, The Scientific Research Honor Society: 111–115. doi:10.1511/2011.89.111. JSTOR 23019241.
- Sharp, Dennis (2002). 20th Century Architecture: A Visual History (3rd, illustrated ed.). Images Publishing. ISBN 978-1-864-70085-5.
- Silk, Michael; Gildenhard, Ingo; Barrow, Rosemary (2017). The Classical Tradition: Art, Literature, Thought (illustrated ed.). John Wiley & Sons. ISBN 978-1-405-15550-2.
- Skejić, Davor; Boko, Ivica; Torić, Neno (2015). "Aluminium as a material for modern structures" (PDF). Gradevinar. 67 (11): 1075–1085. doi:10.14256/JCE.1395.2015.
- Takenaka Corporation (2000), Dome Transitions Map, Takenaka Corporation, archived from the original on October 6, 2000
- Van Den Heuvel, Dirk (2008). The Challenge of Change: Dealing with the Legacy of the Modern Movement (illustrated ed.). IOS Press. ISBN 978-1-586-03917-2.
- Wahid, Julaihi; Karsono, Bambang (2009), "Alternative to Dome as a Symbol of Masjid and It's [sic] Influence in Indonesian Masjid Design" (PDF), Proceedings of 2nd International Seminar on Islamic Thought, Islam and Muslims: Issues and Challenges, 6 – 7 October 2009, Department of Theology and Philosophy, Universiti Kabangsaan Malaysia
- Rehm, Jörg (2018). "The first concrete dome in Germany? A church building using modern techniques". In Wouters, Ine; Voorde, Stephanie; Bertels, Inge; Espion, Bernard; Jonge, Krista; Zastavni, Denis (eds.). Building Knowledge, Constructing Histories: Proceedings of the 6th International Congress on Construction History (6ICCH 2018), July 9–13, 2018, Brussels, Belgium. CRC Press. ISBN 978-0-429-01362-1.
- Young, Carolyn Ann (1995). The Glory of Ottawa: Canada's First Parliament Buildings (illustrated ed.). McGill-Queen's Press — MQUP. ISBN 978-0-7735-1227-6.
- Zanon, Paolo; Bursi, Oreste S.; Erlicher, Silvano; Zonta, D.; Clemente, Paolo; Indirli, M. (2001). "Intervention Scenarios on the Basilica of San Gaudenzio Dome in Novara". 7th International Seminar on Seismic Isolation, Passive Energy Dissipation and Active Control of Vibrations of Structures, Assisi, Italy, October 2–5, 2001. Assisi, Italy.
- Zanow, Lois; Johnston, Sally (2010). Monuments to Heaven: Baltimore's Historic Houses of Worship (illustrated ed.). AuthorHouse. ISBN 978-1-452-08537-1.
- Zung, Thomas T. K. (2002). Buckminster Fuller: Anthology for the New Millennium. Macmillan. ISBN 978-0-312-28890-7.
