= Pincus (surname) =

Pincus or Pinkus is a surname of Jewish origin, derived from the given name Pinkus, which in turn originates with the Biblical Hebrew male personal name Pinechas (Hebrew: פִּינְחָס) or Phinehas. The name may refer to:

- Albert Pinkus (1903–1984), American chess player
- Anne Pincus (born 1961), Australian artist
- Barry Manilow (born Barry Pincus in 1943), American singer
- Ed Pincus (1938–2013), American filmmaker
- David Pincus (1926–2011), American art collector
- Fred Pincus (born 1942), American sociologist
- Gregory Goodwin Pincus (1903–1967), American biologist
- Harold Alan Pincus (born 1951), American psychiatrist
- Jeff Pinkus (born 1967), American musician
- Lionel Pincus (1931–2009), American businessman
- Lily Pincus (1898–1981), German-British social worker, marital psychotherapist and author
- Mark Pincus (born 1966), American businessman
- Mathilde Pincus (1917–1988), American music supervisor
- Robert Pincus-Witten (born 1935), American art critic and historian
- S. Henry Pincus (d. 1915), American actor, theatre impresario, and inventor
- Shimshon Dovid Pincus (1944–2001), Israeli rabbi
- Steven Pincus (born 1962), American historian
- Walter Pincus (born 1932), American journalist
- Zachary Pincus-Roth (born 1979), American writer

== See also ==
- Pinkas (surname)
