= Pincus =

Pincus or Pinkus may refer to:

== Persons ==
- Pincus (surname)
- Pinchus (given name)
- Pincus Green (born 1936), American businessman
- Pincus Leff (1907–1993), American comedian "Pinky Lee"
- Pincus Rutenberg (1879–1942), Russian engineer

== Other uses ==
- Hoagland-Pincus Conference Center, University of Massachusetts
- Fibroepithelioma of Pinkus, a form of basal-cell carcinoma
- Pincus Building, Alabama
- Pinkus Müller, a German brewery
- Warburg Pincus, an American private equity firm
