= Anne Pincus =

Australian artist, sculptor (born 1961)

- Born: 1961 (age 64–65); Melbourne, Australia
- Education: Monash University, Gippsland campus
- Known for: painting, installation art
- Awards: QEII Arts Council Grant, Re Akaroa Arts Entertainment Programme (1985); Australia Council for the Arts Overseas Development Grant for Besozzo, Italy (1996); Studio Support (Atelierförderung) by the City of Munich's cultural department (1998–2001); 1st Prize, "Kunstfrühling", Bad Wörishofen, Germany (2003)
- Website: annepincus.net

Anne Pincus (born Melbourne, 1961) is an Australian painter and installation artist. She currently lives in Munich, Germany.

Pincus studied Visual Art at the Monash University, Gippsland campus from 1978 to 1983. She was a member of the Roar 2 Studio artists collective in Fitzroy, Melbourne. She received her Graduate Diploma in Religious Education from La Trobe University in 1992. In 1994 she moved to Germany. She has participated in many group and solo exhibitions.

Nevill Drury wrote in 1994 that "Anne Pincus ... introduce[s] a more general mystical quality to their painting which evokes a sense of space and timelessness not rooted in any specific religio[n]". Although she lives in Germany, Pincus has exhibited occasionally in Australia and sometimes addresses the experience of Australian artists living overseas. A review of her "ask the dust" exhibition in 1998 in Sydney stated her exhibition was "based on the difference between the light, sand and dust of Australia and Israel and the darkness of Europe" and that she was enthusiastic "for the opportunities in Europe for cross-cultural collaboration."

In the 2010s, Pincus explored contrasting ways of depicting places, and the symbolism of gardens, overlaying the symbols of topographical maps on to blurred oil paintings of gardens. She has also explored different perceptions of forests, as threatening, fairy-tale like or vulnerable, through her paintings and installations.

In 2014, she participated in an artistic exploration of the theme 'Building Bridges with Christ' displayed in Saint Blaise Abbey, Black Forest, with an installation called 'Parachute Love', a parachute suspended floating beneath the Gothic vault. She had also displayed this installation in St. Benedict's Church, Munich, in 2006.

Pincus also teaches at the Münchner Volkshochschule, the Munich Adult Education Centre.

== Solo exhibitions ==
- 1984: "Recent Works", The Gallery, Akaroa, New Zealand
- 1993:
  - "Recent Paintings", Melbourne Contemporary Art Gallery, Melbourne
  - "Shadow Stories", Access Contemporary Art Gallery, Sydney
- 1997: "Malerei", Café Gap, Munich
- 1998: "ask the dust", Access Contemporary Art Gallery, Sydney
- 1999: "Ölgemälde", Jazzclub Unterfahrt, Munich
- 2000: "Distillations", Access Contemporary Art Gallery, Sydney
- 2001: European Patent Office, Munich
- 2003: "Transcience" (installation), St. Rupert's Church, Munich
- 2004:
  - "Of the Body and Other Strange Phenomena", 84 GHz, Munich
  - "In der Schwebe" (installation), Church of the Resurrection (Auferstehungskirche), Munich
- 2006: "Parachute love" (installation), St. Benedict's Church, Munich
- 2009: "The Latitude of Shadows", Galerie Kaysser, Munich
- 2010: "Swimming with Medusa" (installation), werkschau.galerie für objekte + bilder, Munich
- 2012: "The lay of the land: a topographical memoir", Anita Traverso Gallery, Melbourne
- 2014 "Anne Pincus | The Alchemist's Garden", International Press Club of Munich

== Selected group exhibitions ==
- 1986: Nicola Jackson, Anne Pincus, James Paul Gallery, Christchurch, New Zealand
- 1990: Inside Stories, Roar 2 Studios, Melbourne
- 2008: “Open Studio”, Anne Pincus and the naughty see monkey, 45 Downstairs Gallery, Melbourne
- 2009: International Art, Schloss Ruhpolding (works from "The Latitude of Shadows")
- 2014: "Parachute love" (installation), Saint Blaise Abbey, Black Forest (with others)
- 2015: "Planet solitude" P-Galleria of the Artists' Association in Pori, Finland
- 2019: "20 Positionen", Akademie für Politische Bildung, Tutzing, Bavaria
- 2021 "Blicklichtung", KVD Gallery, Dachau (with Eva Ertl)
- 2022:
  - 19th Lenggries Art Week, Prinz Heinrich barracks, Lenggries, Bavaria ("Swimming with Medusa" and "Persephone's Garden" installations)
  - Downunder in Munich, Werkgalerie Einstein 28, Munich
- 2022: "Unter Holz über Wasser" (Under Wood, over Water), Landshut Art Association (with Eva Ertl)
- 2022-2023 "Playing With Nature" Annual Exhibition Tutzing: Exhibition with 30 female artists of GEDOK Munich
- 2024: "Trouble in Paradise", galerieGEDOKmuc
