= List of Princeton Triangle Club shows =

The Princeton Triangle Club presents musical theater written and performed by Princeton undergraduates. Several major American writers (for example, F. Scott Fitzgerald and Edmund Wilson) were involved with the club while students.

== Academic year / show (if more than one show is listed, the first is the mainstage show) ==
- 1890–1891 Po-ca-hon-tas, or The Gentle Savage
- 1891–1892 Katharine
- 1892–1893 The Honorable Julius Caesar
- 1893–1894 The Honorable Julius Caesar
- 1894–1895 Snowball; Who's Who
- 1895–1896 The Mummy
- 1896–1897 Lend Me Five Shillings; A Tiger Lily
- 1897–1898 Po-ca-hon-tas, or The Gentle Savage
- 1898–1899 The Privateer, or The Pirates of Pennsnec
- 1899–1900 A Woodland Wedding
- 1900–1901 The King of Pomeru
- 1901–1902 The King of Pomeru
- 1902–1903 The Mullah of Miasma
- 1903–1904 The Man From Where
- 1904–1905 The Pretenders
- 1905–1906 Tabasco Land
- 1906–1907 The Mummy Monarch
- 1907–1908 When Congress Went to Princeton
- 1908–1909 The Duchess of Bluffshire
- 1909–1910 His Honor the Sultan
- 1910–1911 Simply Cynthia
- 1911–1912 Main Street
- 1912–1913 Once in a Hundred Years
- 1913–1914 The Pursuit of Priscilla
- 1914–1915 Fie! Fie! Fi-Fi!
- 1915–1916 The Evil Eye
- 1916–1917 Safety First
- 1917–1918 (a four-man troupe entertained troops in Europe)
- 1918–1919 The Honorable Julius Caesar
- 1919–1920 The Isle of Surprise
- 1920–1921 They Never Come Back
- 1921–1922 Espanola; The Devil's Disciple
- 1922–1923 The Man From Earth
- 1923–1924 Drake's Drum
- 1924–1925 The Scarlet Coat
- 1925–1926 Fortuno
- 1926–1927 Samarkand; Captain Applejack
- 1927–1928 Napoleon Passes
- 1928–1929 Zuider Zee
- 1929–1930 The Golden Dog; The Second Man
- 1930–1931 The Tiger Smiles
- 1931–1932 Spanish Blades
- 1932–1933 It's the Valet; Private Lives
- 1933–1934 Fiesta; Goodbye Again
- 1934–1935 Stags at Bay (incl. East of the Sun (and West of the Moon)); Holiday
- 1935–1936 What a Relief!
- 1936–1937 Take It Away
- 1937–1938 Fol-de-Rol
- 1938–1939 Once Over Lightly; Spring Shambles
- 1939–1940 Any Moment Now
- 1940–1941 Many A Slip
- 1941–1942 Ask Me Another
- 1942–1943 Time and Again
- 1943–1946 (no shows, due to World War II)
- 1946–1947 Clear the Track
- 1947–1948 All Rights Reserved
- 1948–1949 All in Favor
- 1949–1950 Come Across
- 1950–1951 Too Hot for Toddy
- 1951–1952 Never Say Horses
- 1952–1953 Ham 'n Legs
- 1953–1954 Malice in Wonderland
- 1954–1955 Tunis, Anyone?
- 1955–1956 Spree de Corps
- 1956–1957 Take a Gander
- 1957–1958 After a Fashion
- 1958–1959 For Heaven's Sake
- 1959–1960 Breakfast in Bedlam
- 1960–1961 Midsummer Night Scream; Guys and Dolls
- 1961–1962 Tour de Farce
- 1962–1963 Ahead of the Game
- 1963–1964 Funny Side Up
- 1964–1965 Grape Expectations
- 1965–1966 High Sobriety
- 1966–1967 Sham on Wry
- 1967–1968 Enter Venus
- 1968–1969 A Different Kick
- 1969–1970 Call a Spade a Shovel; '70 Minutes
- 1970–1971 Cracked Ice
- 1971–1972 Blue Genes; One More Hour for Uncle Ben
- 1972–1973 Future Schlock
- 1973–1974 A Titter Ran Through the Audience
- 1974–1975 American Zucchini; Blithe Spirit
- 1975–1976 Mugs Money
- 1976–1977 Kafka, Tea or Me
- 1977–1978 Chile Today, Guacamole
- 1978–1979 Academia Nuts; Happily Ever After
- 1979–1980 From Here to Hilarity; String of Pearls
- 1980–1981 Bold Type and Company
- 1981–1982 Stocks and Bondage and Cabaret; Fool's Gold: 85 Minutes of the Best of Triangle
- 1982–1983 Under the Influence; Merrily We Roll Along
- 1983–1984 Revel Without a Pause; Three Penny Opera
- 1984–1985 No. 96-Untitled; The Best Little Whorehouse in Texas
- 1985–1986 Star Spangled Banter; The Boy Friend
- 1986–1987 Business Unusual; Applause; 90 Minutes of the Best of Triangle
- 1987–1988 Ain't Mythbehavin'; No Strings; 91 Minutes of the Best of Triangle
- 1988–1989 Satanic Nurses; Little Shop of Horrors
- 1989–1990 Easy Street
- 1990–1991 The Older, the Better; Into the Woods; 94 Minutes of the Best of Triangle
- 1991–1992 Do-Re-Media;The Centennial Revue: "100 Years and Still Kicking";95 Minutes of the Best of Triangle
- 1992–1993 Shelf Indulgence; A Funny Thing Happened on the Way to the Forum; 96 Minutes of the Best of Triangle
- 1993–1994 Bermuda Love Triangle; 97 Minutes of the Best of Triangle
- 1994–1995 Rhyme and Punishment; 98 Minutes of the Best of Triangle
- 1995–1996 Pulpit Fiction
- 1996–1997 The Tiger Roars; It's a Wonderful Laugh
- 1997–1998 In Lava and War
- 1998–1999 101 Damnations; The Rude Olympics; Palindromes are Fun!
- 1999–2000 The Blair Arch Project; The Rude Olympics II: American Booty; Menage '03
- 2000–2001 Puns of Steel; 2004Play; The Rude Olympics III
- 2001–2002 Absurd to the Wise; sLAUGHTERhouse '05; The Rude Olympics IV
- 2002–2003 This Side of Parody; '06 Degrees of Separation; The Rude Olympics V: Schlock & Awe
- 2003–2004 For Love or Funny; '07 Deadly Sins; The Rude Olympics VI: Weapons of Mass Distraction
- 2004–2005 Orange and Black to the Future; Magic 8 Ball; The Rude Olympics VII: Fondling Neverland
- 2005–2006 Excess Hollywood; Love Potion '09; Rude Olympics VIII: An Eye for an iPod
- 2006–2007 Heist Almighty; Crude In'10tions; Rude Olympics IX: The Devil Wears Nada
- 2007–2008 A Turnpike Runs Through It: A New Jersical; Knockin' on '11's Door; Rude Olympics X: Whitman Can't Jump
- 2008–2009 Stark Raven Mad; All's Well That Ends '12; WaWall-E
- 2009–2010 Store Trek; A Night at the Apollo '13, Cornel West Side Story
- 2010–2011 Family Feudalism; Chicken Soup '14 Souls, Dial Elm for Murder
- 2011–2012 Doomsdays of our Lives; Freshman '15; Are You There Dod? It's Me, Marquand
- 2012–2013 Tree's Company (Forest's a Crowd); My Super Sweet '16; Shirley You're Joking, Mrs. Tilghman!
- 2013–2014 Zero Gravitas; NC-'17; Waiting for Guyot
- 2014–2015 An Inconvenient Sleuth; You Must Be '18 or Older to Enter; A Wrinkle Intime
- 2015–2016 Tropic Blunder; A '19 Shining Armor; The Forbes Awakens
- 2016–2017 Greece’d Lightning!; Are You Feeling '20, Too?; Manchester By The C-Store
- 2017–2018 Spy School Musical; '21 Pun Salute; Terrace Bueller's Day Off
- 2018–2019 Night of the Laughing Dead; You're a Catch, '22!; McCosh Me If You Can
- 2019–2020 Once Uponzi Time; ‘23 and Me; Blairasite
- 2020–2021 All Underdogs Go To Heaven; The '24ce Awakens
- 2021–2022 Singin' In The Train; '2 All The Boys 5 Loved Before; Call Me By Your NetID
- 2022–2023 Campelot; '2Sixy & I Know It; Cocaine Blair
- 2023–2024 Ship Happens, A Cruisical; All Dogs Go '27; Poe Things
- 2024-2025 Pageant Pending; 2 Little '2 8; Emilia PéRez College
- 2025-2026 Aisle Be Damned!; Can You Feel the Love '2 9; TBD

== Literature ==
- Donald Marsden: The Long Kickline: A History of the Princeton Triangle Club (Princeton: Princeton Triangle Club, 1968).
