= Church of Saint Rupert (Munich) =

Roman Catholic church in Munich, Germany

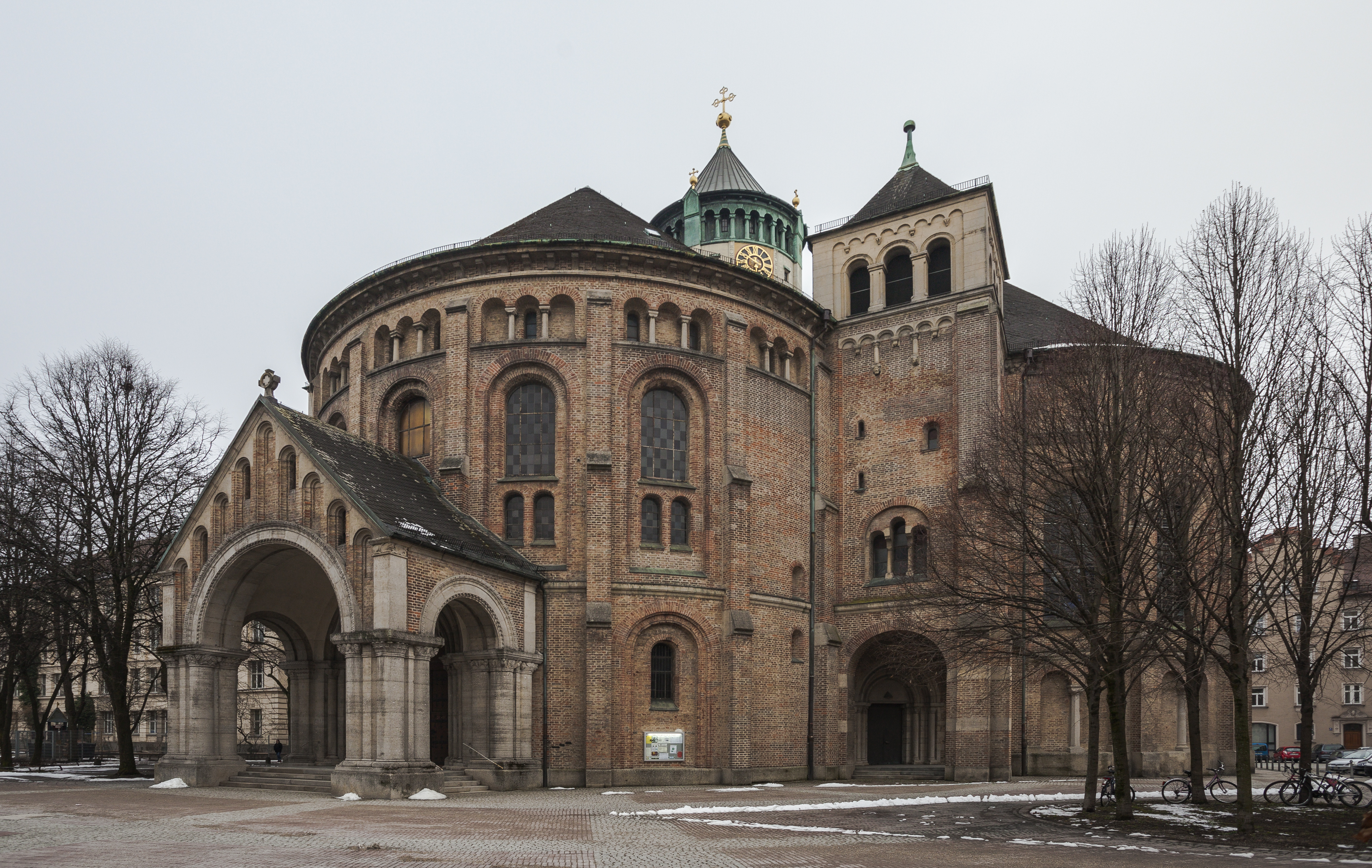
- St. Rupert Church from the street, 2013
- Church of Saint Rupert
- 48°8′8.4″N 11°32′9.2″E
- Address: Gollierplatz 1, 80339 Munich
- Country: Germany
- Denomination: Roman Catholic

History
- Consecrated: 1908

Architecture
- Architect: Gabriel von Seidl
- Style: Neo-Romanesque
- Years built: 1901-1903

The Church of Saint Rupert (German: Kirche Sankt Rupert) is a Roman-Catholic parish church in the Schwanthalerhöhe district of Munich. It is named after Saint Rupert of Salzburg, chosen in honor of Rupprecht, Crown Prince of Bavaria.

== History ==
In the late nineteenth century, the population of Schwanthalerhöhe had grown so significantly that the nearby St. Benedict's Church couldn't accommodate all of its parishioners a mere twenty years after its construction. Plans were made for a new church, designed in 1898 by Gabriel von Seidl. Work on the church began in 1901 and finished in 1903, finally being consecrated in 1908 by the archbishop at the time, Franz Joseph von Stein.

== Architecture ==
The Church of St. Rupert was originally designed by Gabriel von Seidl in 1898 and built from 1901 to 1903. It is designed in the shape of a quatrefoil, with three towers and a vestibule placed in the four corners where the circles meet. The interior domes used to be ornamented in detail, but following redesigns in the 1960s the domes were repainted white without their former intricate details, drawing attention to the colorful stained glass windows above.

== Interior ==
The original wall painting was removed in 1935 and the dome was repainted white. From 1964 to 1966, a radical modification brought about the removal of the high altar and minimization of the other altars by Anton Pruska. The result is assessed extremely critically in the Handbook of German Art Monuments: “Due to the renovation in 1964–66 with its uniform white paint and destruction of the romanticizing furnishings, the interior was artistically devalued.”

The interior is characterized by nineteen large leadlight windows created by Georg Schönberger around 1965 as part of a thorough modernization of the interior. The new stained glass windows feature distinctly modern and rectangular panes of solid color; any theological or religious imagery is indiscernible.

The wooden figure of the church patron Saint Rupert still remains from the former high altar, and the figure of the Virgin Mary from a side altar. The right side altar, formerly St. Joseph's altar, now the sacrament altar, shows scenes from Jesus' childhood in the antependium relief of the altar bar. The bronze tabernacle was created by Josef Hamberger.

The east dome is dominated by the “Warrior Altar” made in 1927 by Hans and Benno Miller. The war memorial consists of a terracotta relief with the Pietà between Saints George and Barbara and inscribed on terracotta panels embedded in the wall above the altar bar is: "Den Kriegsopfern der Sanct Rupertuspfarrei Friede, Auferstehung und Herrlichkeit." which translates from German to mean: "Peace, resurrection, and glory to the war victims of the Sanct Rupertus parish."

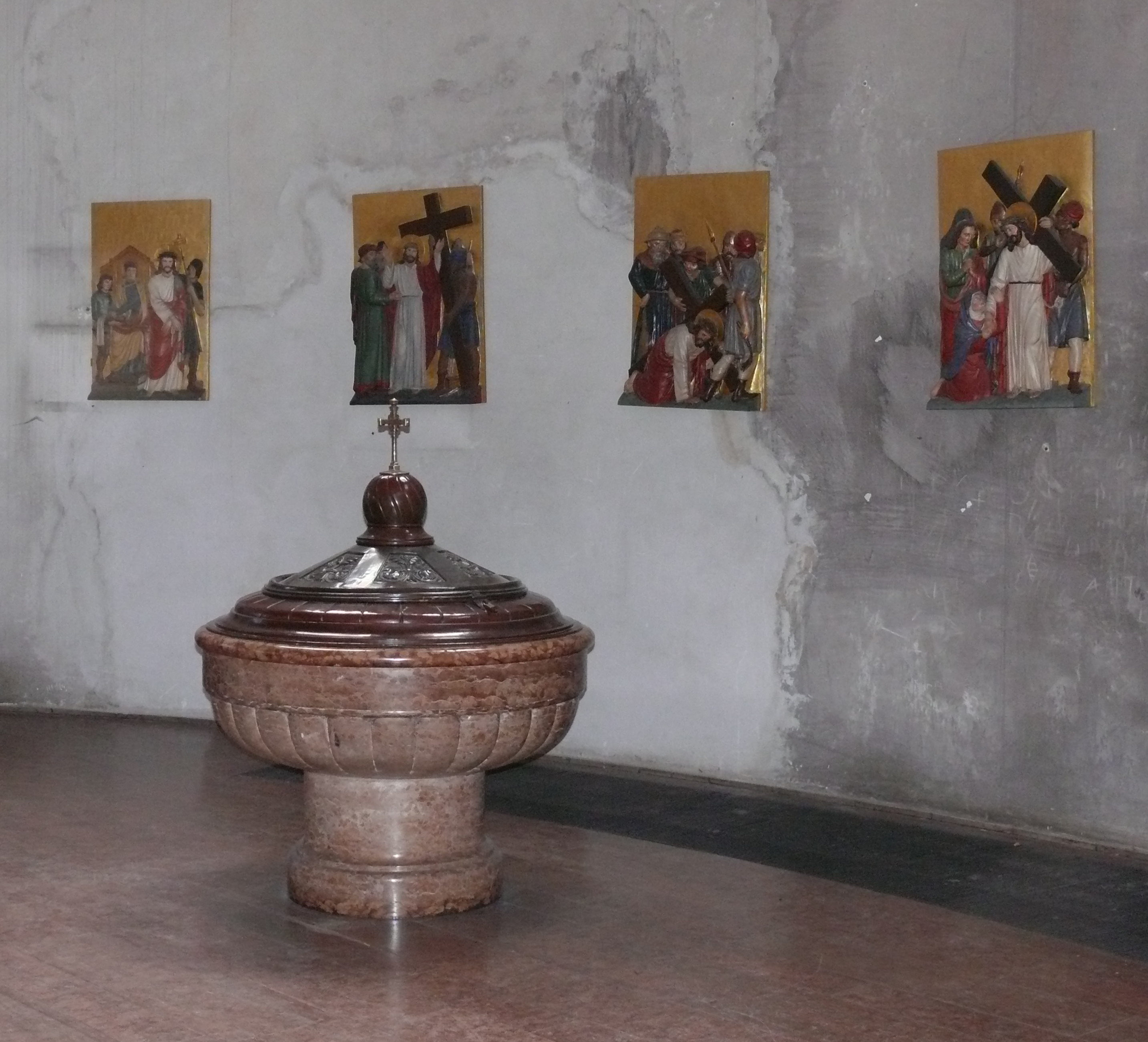
Stations of the Cross and baptismal font, 2022

Fourteen shining gold Stations of the Cross in Neo-Romanesque style stand out from the soot-stained and colorless walls of the dome.

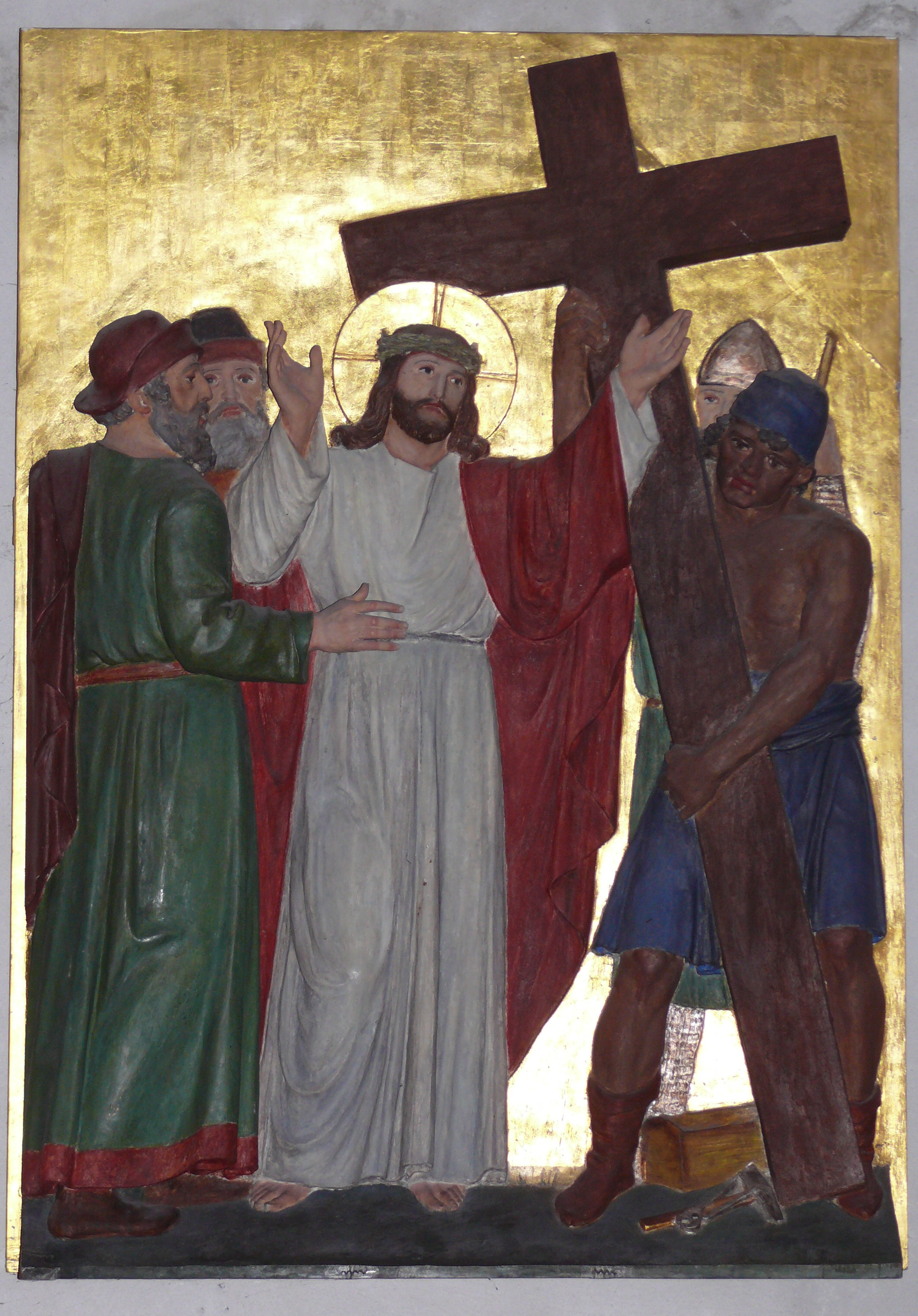
Christ the Lord takes up His Cross, Stations of the Cross, Church of St. Rupert, 2022

The west dome features a stout red marble baptismal font and a memorial plaque with a relief depicting the Good Shepherd and commemorating Georg Reisinger, the first pastor of St. Rupertus Church from 1923 to 1927.

== Organ ==
The large organ was built in 1905 by Franz Borgias Maerz as op. 497 with 28 registers on two manuals and pedals. Large parts probably come from the Maerz organ op. 206 from 1887 for the concert hall of the Royal Odeon. This had 25 registers on two manuals and was replaced in 1905 by a Walcker organ with IV/62. The organ in St. Rupert was rebuilt by Magnus Schmid in 1933 and expanded to 37 registers. The cone chest instrument today has 39 registers on two manuals and a pedal. The playing and register actions are pneumatic. A special feature is the register Vox humana in the swell, which is located in an independent swell box.
