= Pinkas (surname) =

Pinkas (Yiddish: פנקס) is a Jewish surname of eastern Ashkenazi origin,, a variant of Pincus. Notable people with the surname include:

- Alon Pinkas (born 1961), Israeli diplomat
- Aviv Pinkas (born 1992), Israeli actress
- David-Zvi Pinkas (1895–1952), Israeli politician
- Israel Pincas (born 1935), Israeli poet
- Etai Pinkas (born 1973), Israeli politician
- Karol Pinkas (1950–2023), Polish chess master
- Sally Pinkas (21st century), Israeli pianist
