= Zachary Pincus-Roth =

American writer

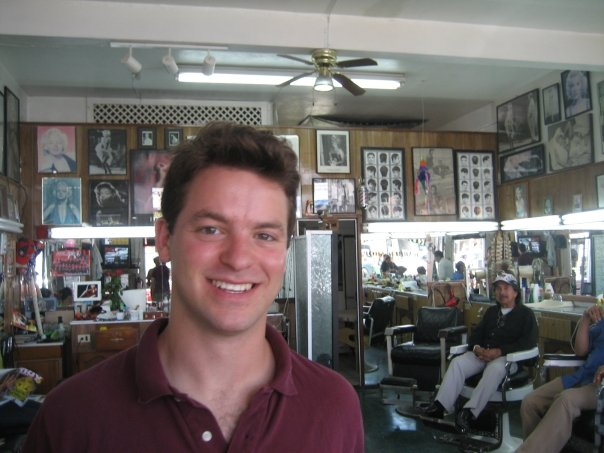
- Pincus-Roth in a barbershop in Ensenada, Mexico
- Born: 1979 or 1980 (age 46–47)
- Occupations: entertainment journalist, author, and TV writer
- Notable credit(s): Lie to Me; Avenue Q (book)
- Parents: Dr. Harold Alan Pincus (father); Ellyn S. Roth (mother)
- Website: zacharypincus-roth.com

Zachary Pincus-Roth is an American entertainment journalist, author, and TV writer. In January 2016, he joined the Washington Post as pop culture editor.

== Education ==
Pincus-Roth was raised in Chevy Chase, Maryland and attended Richard Montgomery High School in Rockville, Maryland, where he graduated in 1998 and received a Lazarus Leadership Fellowship. At Richard Montgomery he was sports editor, news editor, and editor-in-chief of The Tide and authored an op-ed column entitled "Can I Say One Thing."

He received his Bachelor of Arts degree in philosophy from Princeton University in 2002. He wrote his senior thesis on Seinfeld and authored a column in The Daily Princetonian where he opined on the blissful lives of squirrels, unrecognized discrimination, and cultural relativism toward nudity, among other topics. He wrote and acted for the Princeton Triangle Club musical comedy group.

== Career ==
Living in New York City after college, he worked as staff writer for Variety and Playbill, and contributed to other publications including Newsday, the Los Angeles Times, and The New York Times, among others. 50

In 2006, he authored the companion book to the hit musical Avenue Q.

His 2010 Slate article "Best Weekend Never" received the National Entertainment Journalism Award for Best Online Feature Article. and the Southern California Journalism Award for Online Entertainment.

While working on the drama Lie To Me in 2010, Pincus-Roth penned the song White Lie sung by Felicia Day.

In 2014, he received a fellowship from the International Center for Journalists through which he published a longform article about the role of television in shaping culture and behavior in India.

Before joining the Washington Post, he worked as Arts & Culture Editor for LA Weekly since 2011, and instructor at Loyola Marymount University.
