= Princeton Triangle Club =

Theater troupe at Princeton University

The Princeton Triangle Club is an American theater troupe at Princeton University, located in Princeton, New Jersey.

Founded in 1891, it is one of the oldest collegiate theater troupes in the United States. Triangle premieres an original student-written musical every year, and then takes that show on a national tour. The club is known for its signature kickline; historically performed by the men of the ensemble in drag, the kickline has recently been performed by a co-ed cast.

The troupe presents several shows throughout the year, beginning in September with the Frosh Week Show. In the autumn, it premieres the year's new Triangle Show, an original student-written musical comedy, professionally directed and choreographed and performed in McCarter Theatre; this Triangle Show goes on a national tour in January. In the spring, the club showcases the new writers' material in a smaller campus venue. And during Princeton Reunions after the end of the spring semester, the year's Triangle Show plays its final performances at McCarter.

The club's notable alumni include F. Scott Fitzgerald, Booth Tarkington, Russel Wright, Joshua Logan, Brooks Bowman, Jimmy Stewart, Charles Arnt, José Ferrer, Wayne Rogers, Clark Gesner, Jeff Moss, David E. Kelley, Nicholas Hammond, Zachary Pincus-Roth, and Brooke Shields.

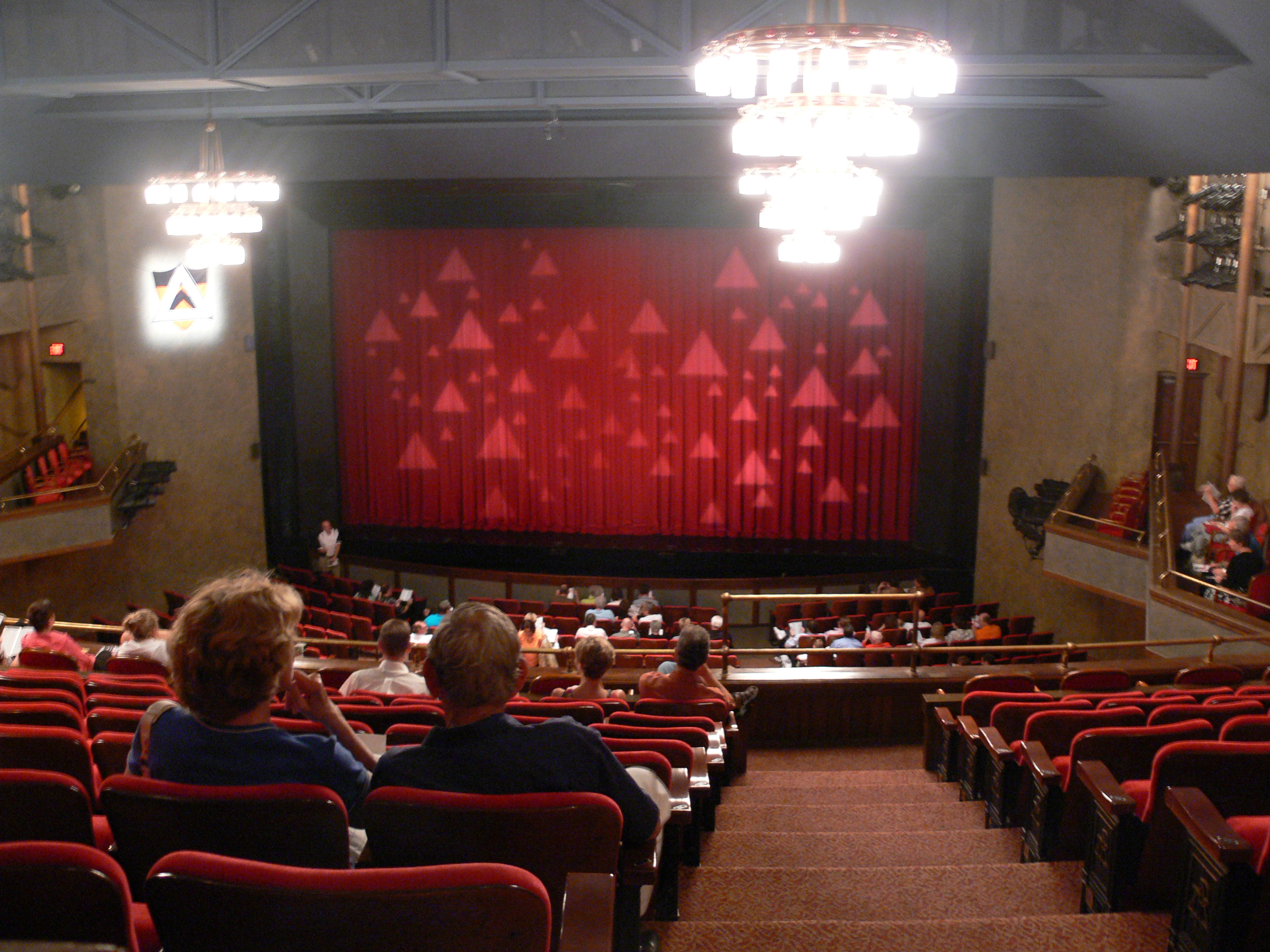
McCarter Theatre, before the Triangle Show

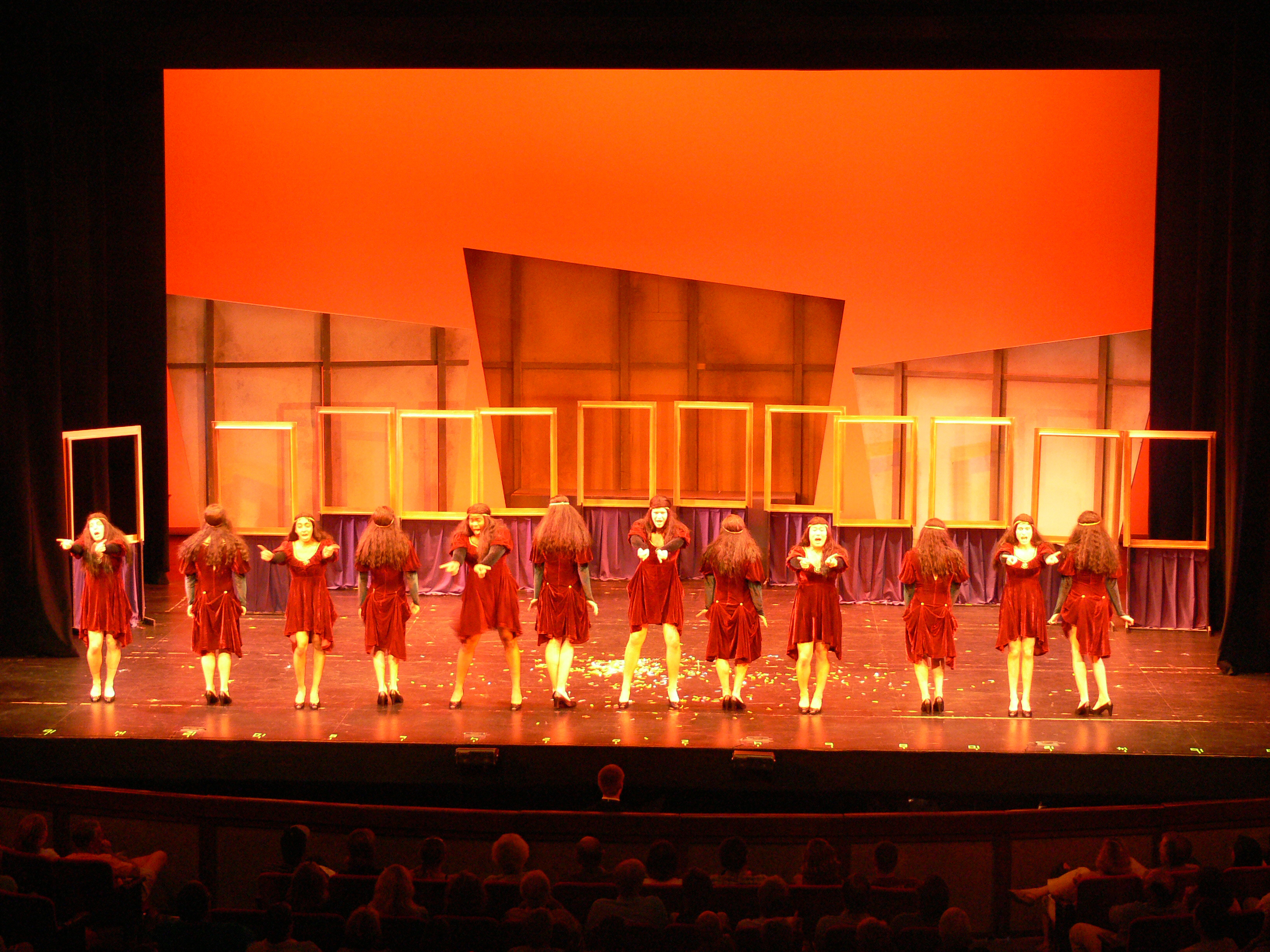
"Heist Almighty" (Triangle Show, 2006-07); the male ensemble approaches the traditional kickline number

== History ==
The history of the Princeton Triangle Club reflects many major social, cultural, economic, political, literary and theatrical trends in the United States during the late 19th and 20th centuries. For most of its history, the club has produced student writing performed by students. Productions are known for blending topical humor with collegiate irreverence; the kickline has become standard.

=== Beginnings ===
The tradition started with a production by a group called the Princeton College Dramatic Association in 1883. In keeping with the practice of all-male institutions at the time, women's roles were played by men. Entr'acte music, provided by the Instrumental or Banjo Clubs, were often popular dance tunes or excerpts from operas. The early theatricals were fundraisers for financially struggling athletic associations.

In 1891, the Dramatic Association joined forces with the University Glee Club to present Po-ca-hon-tas, the first show in the Triangle tradition of musicals written and produced by students. The reworked John Brougham play was performed both on campus and in Trenton. But the faculty vetoed a proposed New York performance.

Over the years, students and administrators would often be at odds over theatrical activities. Nevertheless, the association visited Trenton once again the following year with Katharine, a Shakespearean spoof marking the first appearance of Booth Tarkington (1893) in the Triangle records.

The 1893 production, The Honorable Julius Caesar, was again a reworking of Shakespeare. Tarkington, a senior and president of the Dramatic Association, was both co-author of the book and acted in the role of Cassius. The show was repeated the following year with several significant changes. Most importantly, the Princeton University Dramatic Association had been renamed the Triangle Club of Princeton.

=== Early growth ===
Financial problems caused club members to curtail expenses in 1895. Neither the February production, Who's Who, nor the May offering, Snowball, were written by students, and both had relatively small casts. The following year the club turned to a recent graduate, Post Wheeler '91, in hopes that his magic touch as co-author of The Honorable Julius Caesar could be repeated, and they were pleased with the result.

The Mummy (1895–96) was also notable as the first production in Triangle's new home, the Casino, located on the lower campus near the present-day McCarter Theatre site. Yet another innovation was attempted in 1897. A Tiger Lily, the first Triangle show to be based on Princeton student life, was part of a double bill with Lend Me Five Shillings, a British farce. Since neither show was a great success, the club returned to the tried and true in 1898 with a revival of Po-ca-hon-tas.

The Privateer, presented in 1899, was originally entitled The Captain's Kidd Sister, but the name was changed because the University of Pennsylvania's Mask and Wig Club had already produced a show about Captain Kidd. The "Privateer March" was the first commercially published Triangle song.

=== Traditions begin ===
In 1901, with The King of Pomeru, Triangle ventured for the first time to New York, and the next year the club ventured as far as Pittsburgh. After the 1901 New York performance, Franklin B. Morse (1895) proposed a meeting to organize Triangle alumni, who he believed could help promote the club, build its reputation, arrange the annual tour, collect materials and memorabilia, and generally socialize among themselves. In June of that year, thirty-seven alumni met in Princeton, and the Triangle Board of Trustees was established.

After 1900, the Triangle became increasingly established. Printed copies of the scripts began appearing (the first was The Man From Where, performed 1903–04). Performing off campus and on became the norm, which led faculty to vett texts and performances were vetted before the students left campus with their show. Jenny Davidson Hibben, the wife of Princeton President John Grier Hibben, cut off-color passages or topics she considered morally inappropriate. She was a practicing Presbyterian.

In 1907, the first kickline was performed. It was part of The Mummy Monarch, but soon became a standard element of Triangle shows.

=== Budding fame and higher standards ===
By 1910, the tour had extended as far west as Chicago and St. Louis; elaborate social functions were becoming part of the annual trek. With Once in a Hundred Years (1912–13), Triangle moved its tour to the Christmas season, again traveling as far west as St. Louis. The following year, President Wilson and the First Lady attended The Pursuit of Priscilla’s Washington matinee performance; the First Family then hosted a reception for Triangle at the White House.

The Evil Eye (1915–16) had a distinguished pair of neophyte authors: Edmund Wilson (1916) wrote the book, and F. Scott Fitzgerald (1917) was responsible for the lyrics. Although he was never a cast member in a Triangle production, Fitzgerald wrote three shows for the club between 1914 and 1917.

The club had been criticized in previous years by drama professor Donald Clive Stuart who asserted, on the front page of the Princeton University newspaper, that the plays were "too burlesque" and lacked novelty, especially when compared to theatrical culture at other Ivy League schools.

During 1917–18, a four-man Triangle troupe toured Europe to entertain the soldiers stationed there for World War I. After the year hiatus, the club became active again with a revival of The Honorable Julius Caesar.

The first post-war tour occurred when The Isle of Surprise was taken on the road during Christmas break of 1919. The Christmas tour reached as far as Nashville, Tennessee, in 1922; the club presented a musical comedy called Espanola at Nashville's Orpheum Theater.

In the spring of 1922, Triangle staged George Bernard Shaw's The Devil's Disciple. This production marked a milepost in the club's history, for its three female roles were actually played by women. Sets for this production were designed and painted by Russel Wright during his freshman year, marking one of the few times that a freshman was ever allowed to join Triangle.

=== Professionalization and emerging stars ===
During the early 1920s, New York performances began to be booked at the Metropolitan Opera House, although initially there was some concern whether they could fill such a large theatre and whether the men's voices would be strong enough.

Late in 1923, there were negotiations concerning a possible radio broadcast, and in the same year Triangle's music publisher, J. Church Co., corresponded with the Victor Talking Machine Company about a trial recording. But the major event during this decade was the planning and construction of McCarter Theatre for the Triangle Club. The completed theatre opened on February 21, 1930, with a performance of The Golden Dog. McCarter replaced the long-controversial Casino, which burned on January 8, 1924.

Here began the Golden Period for which the Triangle Club became famous, in terms of its eventual contribution of outstanding talent to the Broadway theatre and Hollywood. Within a few years the club would send forth into these professional realms Erik Barnouw '29; C. Norris Houghton, Joshua Logan, and Myron McCormick, all Class of 1931; James Stewart '32; José Ferrer '33; and Nick Foran '34.

The 1935 show, Stags at Bay, featured "East of the Sun (and West of the Moon)", written by Brooks Bowman, which would become the most popular and longest-lasting national hit ever to come out of the Triangle Club. Recorded by Frank Sinatra and Louis Armstrong, among many others, "East of the Sun" still provides the club with royalties. Other songs from the same show, by Bowman, included "Love and Dime" and "Will Love Find a Way?"

=== Difficulties in the Depression years ===
With The Tiger Smiles (1930–31), Triangle writers returned to a Princeton town-and-gown setting for the first time since When Congress Came to Princeton (1908–09). The production was well received, but the club was already beginning to feel the effects of the Great Depression.

In October 1930, the Program Manager reported, "Due to the financial depression, the business of getting ads is a rather difficult one just now." By the following year, economic conditions had begun to affect the tour. South Orange reported poor ticket sales, and the local alumni chairman was concerned with keeping down the cost of stagehands; in Pittsburgh, a poor house and lack of entertainment were attributed to the weak stock market.

When It's the Valet (1932–33) was ready to tour, local alumni groups were either unwilling to sponsor a show or unable to guarantee an adequate sum to cover expenses, let alone show a profit. The club's Graduate Board sought aid from alumni in underwriting the show, but individual contributions were equally difficult to come by.

Throughout the mid-1930s, Triangle continued to tour in spite of the Depression, but there were rumblings of discontent from both the Graduate Board of the club and the university administration. In a 1934 meeting with President Dodds, the board indicated concern about the financial condition of McCarter Theatre; Triangle profits were insufficient to keep McCarter operating in the black, a situation that would become increasingly serious as the decade wore on.

President Dodds had also heard alumni criticism about poor acting and an apparent lack of coaching in connection with the latest show. Yet he remained confident that Triangle could play an important role on campus. Later that year, Club Manager Stryker Warren (1935) received a stern letter from Dean of the College Christian Gauss. Gauss had considered canceling the Christmas tour, first because of financial considerations, and then because of alumni criticism about excessive drinking.

Another change in tradition came during the 1941-42 academic year, when Triangle produced Ask Me Another, its first show in revue format. Then, at a board meeting in September 1943, Graduate Treasurer B. Franklin Bunn (1907) announced that there would be no Triangle Club activities for the duration of the war. The university assumed control of McCarter Theatre during this period, and the building was leased by the military for trainees' use on campus.

=== Post-war comeback ===
In November 1945, the University Committee on Undergraduate Activities issued a report describing Triangle as controversial. The first post-war show, Clear the Track, opened in December 1946 and even managed a seven-city tour. But Triangle was beset with problems the following year for All Rights Reserved (1947–48). The Daily Princetonian reported, "All Rights pretty nearly weren't reserved. A play by the same name had fizzled on Broadway for a bare month, in 1934, and the petulant playwright threatened to sue. Hasty consultation with a Broadway lawyer revealed that the author could not possibly win the suit and that matter was closed." The club resolved tricky labor questions by employing union stagehands and music-hirelings, putting the later to work first in Philadelphia, where they were made to earn their fee by playing with the regular orchestra, and then in Washington, where they provided the intermission music.

Despite ongoing debate in the 1950s about the club's obligations to theatrical professionalism, as well as its questionable effect on the university's reputation, Triangle continued to reach a wider audience through greater media exposure.

In 1948, All in Favor was broadcast on WNBC-TV, becoming the first college show to appear on the new medium of television. The entire score of Too Hot for Toddy (1950–51) was recorded, and members of the cast appeared on The Kate Smith Show and Ed Sullivan's Toast of the Town. Club productions appeared on The Ed Sullivan Show from 1950 to 1957.

During the Christmas tour to Cincinnati, the club's appearance was combined with a large-scale alumni gathering.

Finally, in 1953, a memorandum of agreement was drawn up between Princeton University and the Trustees of the Triangle Club abrogating the McCarter agreement of the 1920s. The club had been unable to cover operating expenses and pay the taxes of the theatre. A full-time general manager was hired for McCarter, and the university, which had been underwriting Triangle's losses, agreed to cancel the club's debts.

A 1955 study stated that there were ninety or more members of the club, and that most of the men participated in the Christmas tour. A third of them said that they had participated in theatrical productions before enrolling at Princeton. Most members were also active in a collegiate sport.

=== The Lyon era ===
Spree de Corps (1955–56) marked the debut of Milton Lyon as Triangle director. From 1955 until his death forty years later, Lyon would direct all but a handful of Triangle's original productions.

Student apathy toward extracurricular activities began to affect Triangle toward the end of the 1950s. At a meeting in October 1958, the board noted a very small turnout for the previous month's auditions. It was decided that more on-campus publicity would help, and as part of this effort Triangle Junior was formed, a group of seven club members who performed favorite Triangle songs at various receptions and functions. Over the following years, this small group would undergo periodic name changes, being known as Triangle Ding! and Triangle Bit Parts before returning to Ding!, as it is called today.

With the gradual elimination of passenger trains in the late 1950s, the club began touring by bus. Early in 1960, there was a proposal to produce a motion picture on the Triangle Club, but a Hollywood writers' strike and possible heavy expenses brought an end to this publicity idea. However, Triangle did embark on its first European tour that summer; the club performed Breakfast in Bedlam (1959–60) at French and German bases of the American army. Tour de Farce (1961–62) became perhaps the most widely toured show: performances in Pasadena and San Francisco marked the first time the show had been seen live on both coasts, and then troupe members again went to Europe that summer to perform at U.S. Army bases.

Funny Side Up (1963–64) was billed as the 75th anniversary show in spite of the fact that number seventy was Tour de Farce, produced only two years earlier. Funny Side Up did not have a smooth start: the writers were slow to produce material, and the trustees even considered the possibility that there would be no show. Because of the diamond jubilee, twenty-one songs from earlier shows were made a part of the program. The tour of Funny Side Up included several southern stops, and the Birmingham, Alabama, visit became problematic when Triangle was booked into a segregated theatre. After some strongly worded letters from board members, it was determined that the performance would either be cancelled or moved to a non-segregated house.

=== Coeducation and other changes ===
A Different Kick (1968–69) was a Triangle milestone, featuring the first female undergraduate to be cast in a club show—Sue Jean Lee (1970), a junior in the Critical Languages Program.

The university's shift to coeducation the next fall would have a profound effect on Triangle. Call a Spade a Shovel (1969–1970) featured six women in a seventeen-member cast. The social and political commentary of the show, most especially its anti-Vietnam War tones, which reflected the views of the Vietnam veteran who was president and much of the country, unleashed an unprecedented storm of alumni protest and caused a mass audience walk-out at the Grosse Pointe, Michigan, tour performance.

This incident, along with growing budgetary and logistical concerns, caused the board of trustees to revise its production schedule. As per the May 1970 report of the board's New Directions Committee, there was to be neither a December show nor a Christmas tour; instead, a spring show was promised, to be followed by a short tour. Cracked Ice opened in April 1971, was repeated for alumni in June, but did finally tour the following December. To cut expenses, the cast and crew stayed in private homes rather than hotels, and non-union halls were booked.

The Princeton Triangle Workshop made its debut in November 1972 with a presentation of The Fantasticks at the Princeton Inn Theater; the following March the workshop produced Transitions in Wilcox Hall.

This began a 25-year tradition of smaller fall productions to complement the full-scale, original spring shows. The fall productions of 1978, Happily Ever After, and 1979, String of Pearls, were both written by undergraduates. For the 1981 spring show, Triangle writers returned to the very roots of the club and based their book musical, Bold Type, on Booth Tarkington's novel, A Gentleman from Indiana.

The 1981 tour again returned to California, but with a revue of Triangle favorites, Fool's Gold, rather than the spring show. The following year, Triangle hired Miriam Fond, the first female director in the club's history. Triangle finally found a permanent home for its fall productions when The Best Little Whorehouse in Texas opened at the Triangle Broadmead Theatre in November 1984. In the 1980s, the club began to present produce revues of the best of Triangle early in the fall to introduce the freshman class to the organization.

=== Centennial ===
The club's centennial was celebrated in 1991 with a series of campus events throughout the year, including the spring show entitled The Older, the Better, a large Firestone Library exhibition of hundreds of items from the Triangle Archives, and a fall reunion weekend of parties and performances. The centennial of 1991 was difficult to reconcile with the fiftieth anniversary show (Once Over Lightly), which had been staged in 1938–39. After much debate, it had been decided that the first original work in the Triangle tradition was Po-ca-hon-tas of 1891, justifying the 1991 centennial.

=== The second century ===
In the late 1990s, the production schedule reverted to its original calendar, in which the new Triangle Show premiered at McCarter in the fall of each academic year, followed in winter by that show's tour. This change meant that in 1997–98, the club needed to generate two full-length musicals in fifteen months, almost twice the writing load of previous years.

In September 1997, Triangle began a writing workshop to coordinate the efforts of the writers; this program was enormously successful, producing In Lava and War in April 1998 and 101 Damnations in November 1998. By the spring of 1999, the corps of twenty-one writers had been so prolific that Triangle presented an extra, original spring show at Theatre Intime, entitled The Rude Olympics.

The 1999–2000 season saw the hundredth anniversary of the kickline in The Blair Arch Project (November 1999), as well as Triangle's return to Theatre Intime in May with The Rude Olympics II: American Booty. Puns of Steel (2000–01) became the first club show to record its score on a CD.

=== Recent developments ===
The club's calendar includes a Frosh Week Show during the first week of classes, the new Triangle Show premiere in November, the national tour in late January, a spring showcase of new writers' material in April/May, and an encore performance in early summer for reunions. The club continues to receive a high level of regional recognition, with the 2007 Triangle Show A Turnpike Runs Through It appearing in The New York Times.

=== Notable cast members and contributors (in chronological order) ===
- Booth Tarkington 1893
- F. Scott Fitzgerald 1917
- Russel Wright 1921 and 1922
- Charles Arnt '29
- Joshua Logan '31
- James Stewart '32
- José Ferrer '34
- Brooks Bowman '36
- Bo Goldman '53
- Wayne Rogers '56
- Clark Gesner '60
- Jeff Moss '63
- A. Scott Berg '71
- David E. Kelley '79
- Cecil Hoffman '84
- Louis Bayard '85
- Brooke Shields '87
- Ellie Kemper '02
- Molly Ephraim '08

=== History of shows ===
see List of Princeton Triangle Club shows

== Literature ==
- Donald Marsden: The Long Kickline: A History of the Princeton Triangle Club (Princeton: Princeton Triangle Club, 1968).
