= St. Benedict's Church, Munich =

St. Benedict's Church
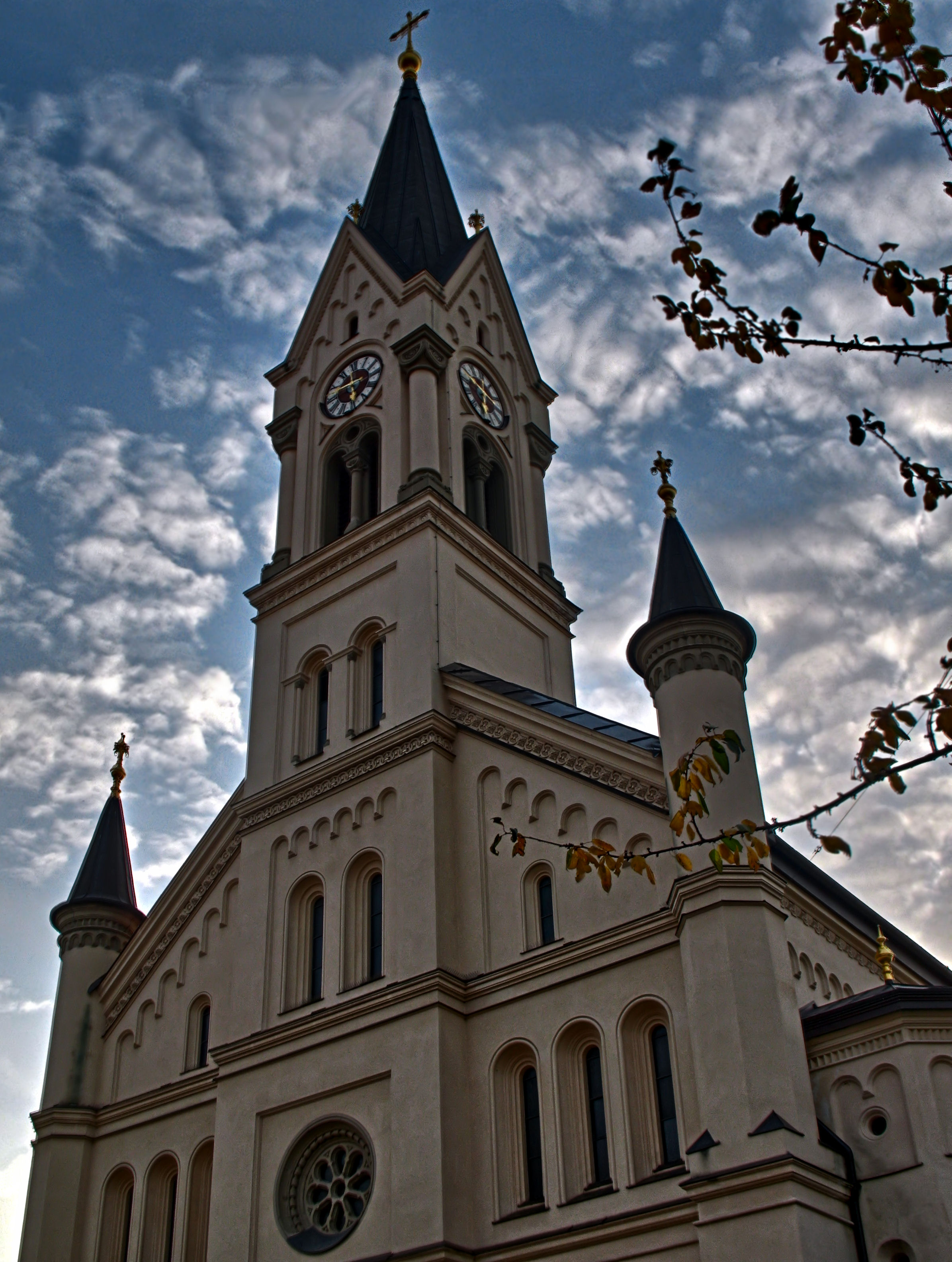
- St. Benedict's Church
- 48°08′20″N 11°32′28″E
- Address: Schrenkstraße 4 Munich, Germany
- Country: Germany
- Denomination: Catholic

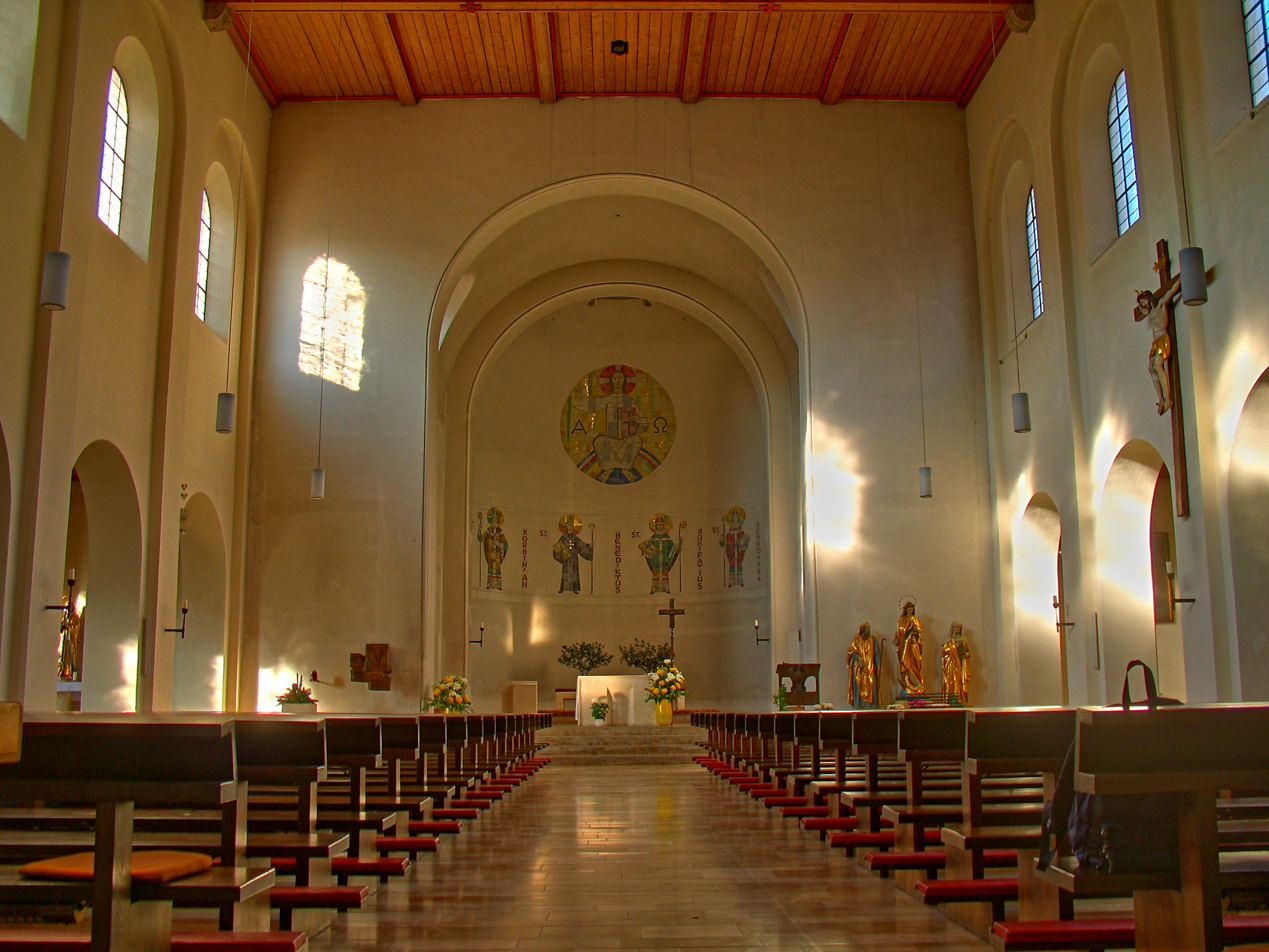
St Benedict's Church, Schwanthalerhöhe, Munich

St. Benedict's Church is a parish church in Munich, Germany, located in the Schwanthalerhöhe (west end) of the city.

== History ==
The church was built from 1878-1880 by the architect Johann Marggraff, being consecrated upon its completion in 1880. Soon, the Catholic population outgrew St. Benedict's capacity and by 1901, work had begun on building the new Church of Saint Rupert designed by Gabriel von Seidl in 1898.

St. Benedict's Church originally served as a branch church of a nearby Benedictine abbey, but the church was made independent in 1923, undergoing an expansion in 1927 and a few furnishing changes in the 1962 and 1969.
