= Dante Bini =

Italian architect and industrial designer

Dr. Dante Bini
- Born: April 22, 1932 (age 94); Castelfranco Emilia, Italy
- Education: Universita' degli Studi di Firenze (University of Florence)
- Occupation: Architect
- Spouse: Adria Moretti
- Children: Stefano Bini, Nicoló Bini
- Practice: Bini-Shells, S.p.A.
- Buildings: Binishell, shell structure
- Design: automated building construction systems

Dante Natale Bini or Dante Bini (born: April 22, 1932) is an Italian industrial designer and architect. He is noted for inventing the Binishell, which is a reinforced thin concrete shell structure that can be lifted and shaped by air pressure. He is also considered a pioneer of automated building construction sequences or automated building construction systems.

== Background ==
Bini was born in 1932 at Castelfranco Emilia, a commune in Emilia-Romagna, Italy. He was the son of Giovanni Bini and Maria Cavallini.

Bini completed liberal studies in Bologna. He then attended the University of Florence and obtained a doctorate in Architecture in 1962. He became influenced by the works of Heinz Isler, Felix Candela, Frei Otto, and Buckminster Fuller.

Bini married Adria Moretti in 1963. In 1981, he immigrated to the United States.

== Career ==
After leaving the University of Florence, Bini became interested in thin-shell concrete domes. He later developed a shell system technology that gave him international recognition.

=== Binishell ===
By the 1960s, he started developing a system for inflating concrete domes after experimenting with inflated balloons as formwork. He was able to design a unique pneumatic formwork using a huge low-pressure balloon. This technique was patented in 1964.

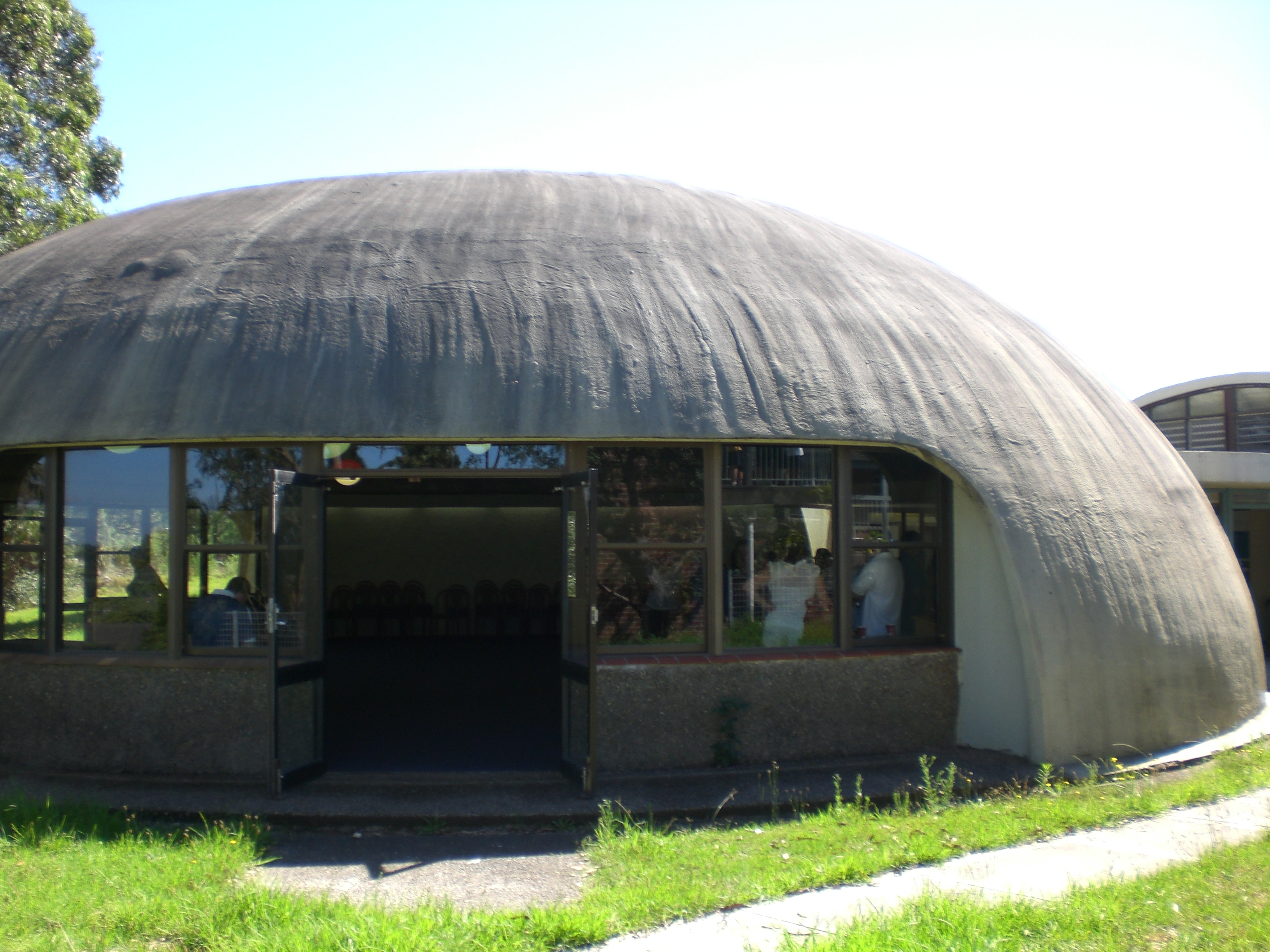
An example of the shell-structure Dante Bini built for a public works initiative by the Australian government.

In July 1965, he was able to lift his first concrete shell near Bologna. It was a sphere with a 12-meter diameter. By the end of that year, Bini successfully built four such domes. During this period, Bini struggled with several problems, which included the uneven distribution of the wet concrete due to asymmetric inflation. By 1967, improvements were made and Bini demonstrated the prototype - a 12-meter dome constructed in a span of few hours - at the Columbia University in New York. This particular construction and those built afterward required helical “springs” reinforced with steel bars to ensure a geometrically controlled inflation, allowing for an even distribution of wet concrete.

From 1970 to 1990, Bini constructed thousands of Binishells around the world, serving different purposes such as homes, schools, sports facilities, and industrial storage units. He stayed for six years in Australia after he was contracted to build Binishells for the Australian government. One of the most notable of these was the Space City Shopping Center in Queensland, which is the world's biggest structure composed of intersecting Binishells. Other Binishells constructed include the Cupola built for Michelangelo Antonioni and Monica Vitti as well as the Binishells built for the Fuji Pavilion during the 1970 Expo at Osaka.

The Binishell technology is also considered a potential solution to housing problems for displaced people, refugees, and evacuees, particularly in areas consistently damaged by disasters. Bini has offered the technology royalty-free to governments and non-governmental organizations (NGOs) that intend to build shelters for these people. The original Binishell has withstood recurring volcanic eruptions and earthquakes on Mount Etna.

=== Other works ===
After the Binishell, Bini started developing the so-called Binishelter automated construction method. It uses prefabricated structural components, which is a combination of eight structural or building materials (four for walls and four for roofs) such as wood, concrete, steel, reinforced clay, durock, sheetrock, concrete, bricks, and bamboo.

Bini, together with architect David Dimitric, also designed Shimizu Corporation's Mega-City Pyramid project, a proposed vertical city over Tokyo Bay built by robots. This structure, which is intended to address urban congestion, is projected to accommodate from 250,000 to 750,000 people.

Bini has also invented a movable, self-erecting tent for the U.S. Army.

The architect has participated in initiatives advancing shell-concrete technology such the colloquium at the University of Stuttgart which focused on air and pneumatic structures.
