= Federation University Australia, Gippsland campus =

Australian university campus

Federation University Australia Gippsland Campus is an Australian university campus located in the town of Churchill 142 km east of Melbourne. Its main neighbouring towns in the region are Morwell and Traralgon. Formerly a branch of Monash University, on 1 January 2014 it became part of Federation University Australia. Study areas at the campus include Arts (Media, Humanities, Communication and Social Science); Business; Education; Information Technology; Nursing; Midwifery; Sport, Outdoor and Physical Education; Psychology; Science; Engineering and Visual Arts.

Federation University Australia came into being after the University of Ballarat merged with Monash University Gippsland Campus. New students commencing their studies at the Gippsland campus from 2014 study under the Federation University Australia entity. Remaining Monash students at the campus were able to complete their degree as Monash University students.

== History ==
The campus began as the Yallourn Technical School in 1928, in order to train State Electricity Commission of Victoria workers for the Yallourn Power Station. It became Yallourn Technical College in 1958.

The Gippsland Institute of Advanced Education (GIAE) took over College courses after it was formed in 1968 at its current location of Churchill. It was amalgamated with Monash University in 1990, initially becoming Monash University College, before becoming a campus of the university in the mid-1990s. In recent years, the campus has undergone substantial expansions and upgrades of its buildings, Science and Engineering (1986), Information Technology (1994), a two level library (1997), Gippsland Education Precinct (2006), and a new auditorium was completed in 2008, replacing the iconic Binishell, demolished in 2009.

In 2008, the Monash Gippsland Medical School was opened, after extensive construction of new facilities and accommodation for the increase in students on campus.

Plans by Monash University to sell the Gippsland campus were mooted in 2013, and were greeted by anger from staff and students concerned that University was selling its campus to the 'highest bidder' and leaving Gippsland without a prestigious Group of 8 university. Some of these fears have been allayed and most campus employees have been re-employed by Federation University Australia, but research-active staff lost their link to the larger university and its facilities. Student enrolments at the campus however have increased since 2014.

The last Monash-appointed head of the campus at Gippsland was Pro-Vice Chancellor Professor Robin Pollard, who was, prior to his appointment at Gippsland, the Pro-Vice Chancellor and President of Monash University Malaysia Campus.

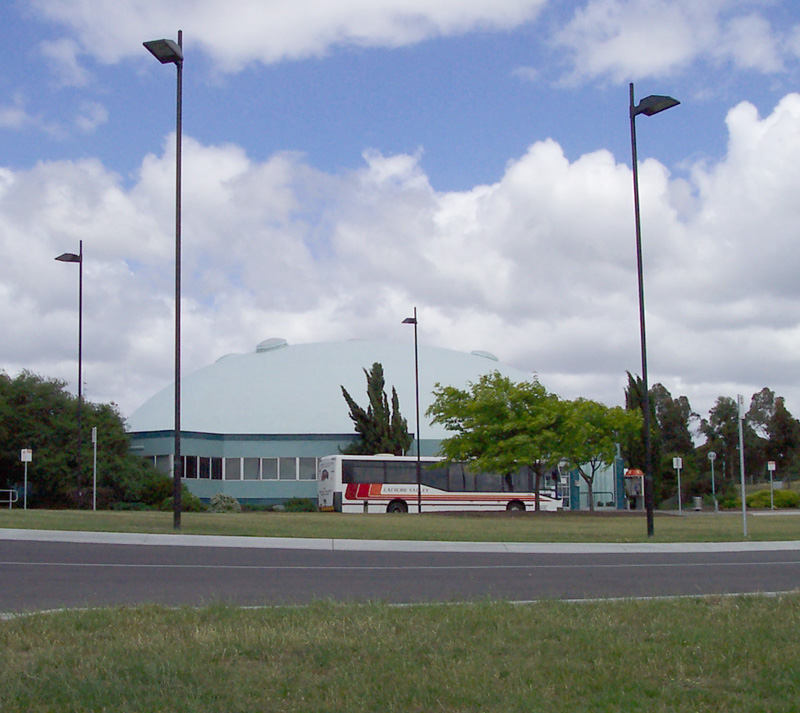
The Gippsland Campus Binishell, which was demolished in 2009.

== Location ==
The Gippsland Campus is one of several Federation University Australia campuses in regional Victoria including campuses in Ballarat, Berwick and the Wimmera. It is situated on 63 hectares of landscaped grounds, next to the Strzelecki Ranges. The region is home to both major environmental and industrial sites in Victoria, including twelve national parks, including Wilsons Promontory and Baw Baw, and the centre of Victoria's electricity industry.

== The Binishell and Auditorium Facility ==
A distinctive architectural feature of the Gippsland campus was the Binishell. A Binishell is large reinforced concrete dome shaped and lifted by air pressure. Its inventor, architect Dr. Dante Bini, directed the construction of the Binishell in December 1979. Around 1,600 Binishells have been built in 17 countries. The eleven metre high binishell, using 300 tons of concrete and reinforcing steel, was inflated by a large membrane in around one hour, using Dr. Dante Bini's ferrocement method. The Binishell was used as a place for exams and graduations. However, due to its diminished structural integrity, during 2004 and early 2005 the building was not used for either of these purposes whilst a new structure support was installed. Normal use of the building was resumed in Semester 1 2005.

On 14 February 2009, the Binishell was demolished due to long-term structural issues which had made it unsafe for ongoing use. Prior to its demolition a new, multi-purpose Auditorium venue was constructed on the east wing of the campus, which is now the main venue for examinations, graduation ceremonies and a range of other major events. Past events hosted at the venue include a sitting of the Victorian State Parliament in 2008 and community events related to the Black Saturday Bush Fire Recovery.

== Primate Breeding and Research Centre ==
The National Primate Breeding and Research Centre is located next to the Gippsland campus. Opened in 2007 and costing $5 million it is Australia's main primate centre housing up to 600 monkeys. The centre remains under the ownership of Monash University.

== Student organisation ==
Federation University Australia students are represented by a Student Senate, with two Gippsland Representatives and multiple other portfolios.

The former Monash campus student union, Monash University Gippsland Student Union (MUGSU), officially appointed a liquidator on 27 October 2016. The organisation began as the GIAE Union in the early 1970s. Each year students were elected to the student union board, with each office bearer in charge of a portfolio of various student issues.

== Threshold student newspaper ==
Until the end of 2013, the campus produced the Monash University Gippsland Student Newspaper that represented all students at Monash Gippsland. The paper was edited by students, and consisted of student articles. It allowed Journalism students the chance to improve their writing skills as well as develop experience in the field of Journalism. Prior publications at the campus included the Threshold Newspaper, which was founded by journalism students Bjornar Kjensli and Timothy Lamacraft in 2002.
