= Binishell =

Architectural shell structure

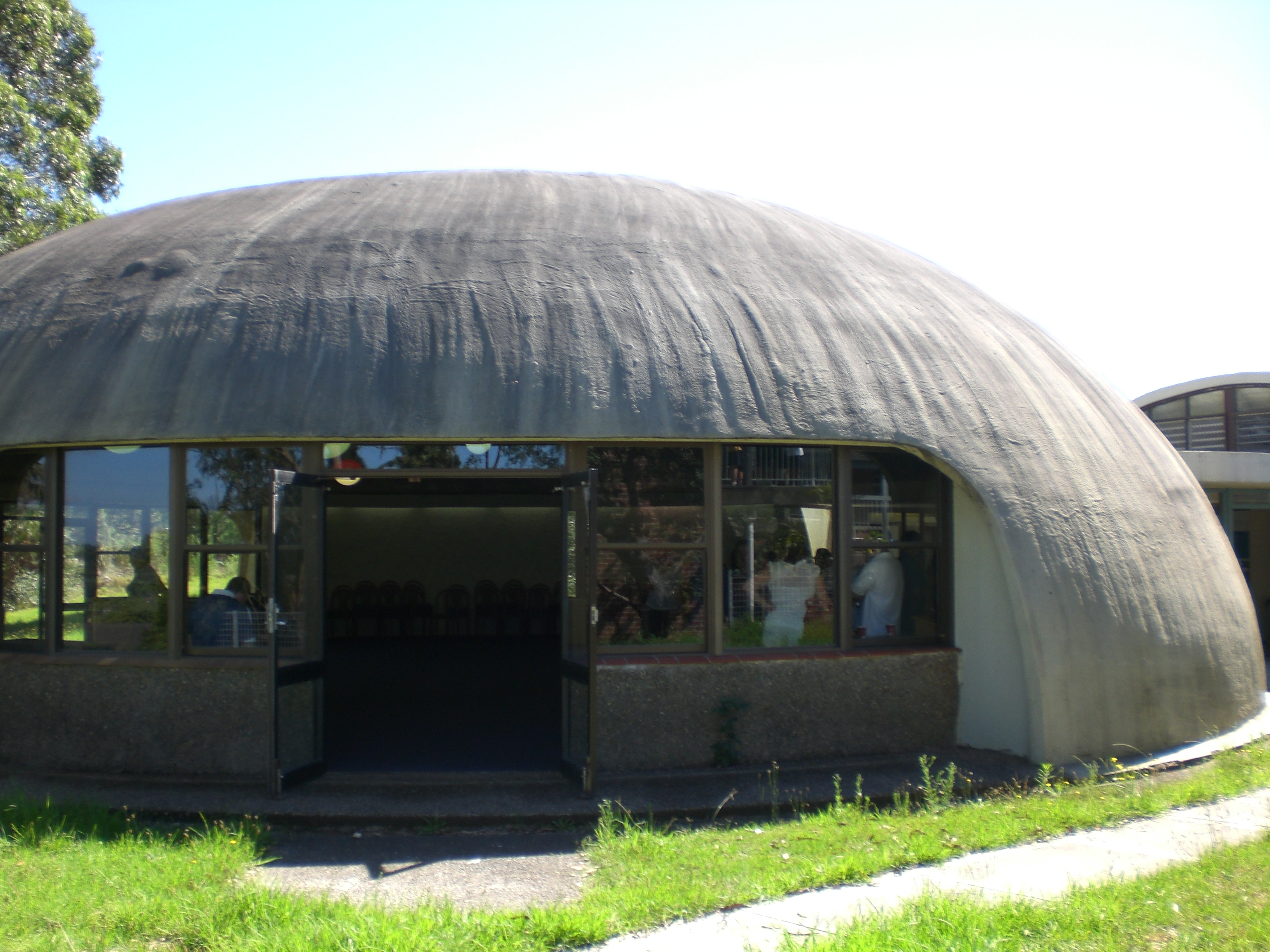
An external view of the main entrance to the Binishell complex at Killarney Heights High School.

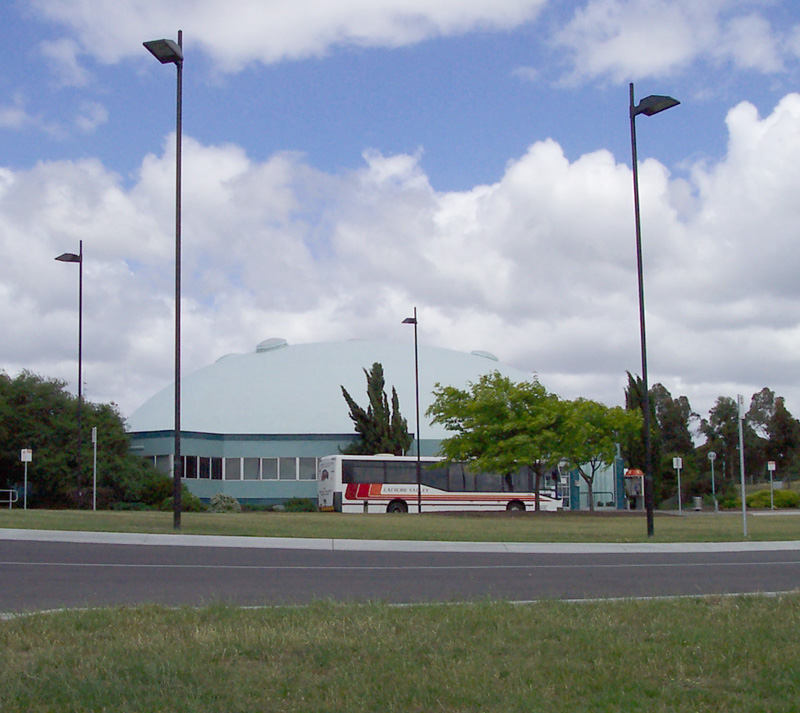
The Binishell at the Federation University Australia Gippsland Campus.

Binishells are reinforced concrete thin-shell structures that are lifted and shaped by air pressure. The original technology was invented in the 1960s by Dante Bini, who built 1,600 of them in 23 countries.

The original Binishell method needs expensive and sophisticated equipment, but it remains one of the fastest and most cost-effective ways to construct dome-shaped, monolithic, and reinforced shell structures.

== Development ==
The original Binishells are circular in plan and are reinforced via a system of springs and rebars. They can often be constructed in less than one hour. The technology was derived from air structure, which is erected just as a balloon is erected. Bini further drew insights from the pneumatic air-supported tennis dome. In 1965, the first Binishell was built. It had a 12-meter diameter, 6-meter height, and was lifted using Bini's patented pneumatic formwork.

Uses for the Binishells range from schools, housing, tourist villages, sports arenas, storage, silos and discothèques. An example of a Binishell was opened in 1978 as a sports hall for the Malvern Girls' College. This Binishell had a size of 36 meters in diameter.

Later, Bini designed a smaller version of the Binishell, known as a Minishell, as a low-cost, 8-meter by 8-meter shell structure. In 1971, several Binishells were constructed in Australia, for a governmental initiative that required rapid building system for multi-purpose centers. Bini also completed the construction of a tourist village in Cairns, Australia, using Minishells in 1980.

More recently the system is being re-launched by Dante Bini's son Nicoló Bini, AIA. Improvements to the original system include greater architectural flexibility, compliance to international building codes, simplification of the construction process and integration of latest material and passive heating/cooling technologies. It is touted as a sustainable building technology since it is said to have one-third the environmental impact over its lifespan. The prototype for this new technology, called System A, was completed in Malibu for actor Robert Downey Jr.

The latest Binishells technology no longer requires air pressure, but relies on tensile forces to give shape to a parabolic hyperboloid shaped building envelope. The resulting building has all the safety and environmental benefits of the improved Binishells, but has added advantages. These additional advantages include a rectangular floor plan, multi-floor capabilities, built-in openings and natural venting. The two story prototype for this technology was built on Vancouver Island, British Columbia, Canada.

== See also ==
- Monolithic dome
