= Jakubany =

Village and municipality in Slovakia

- Municipality
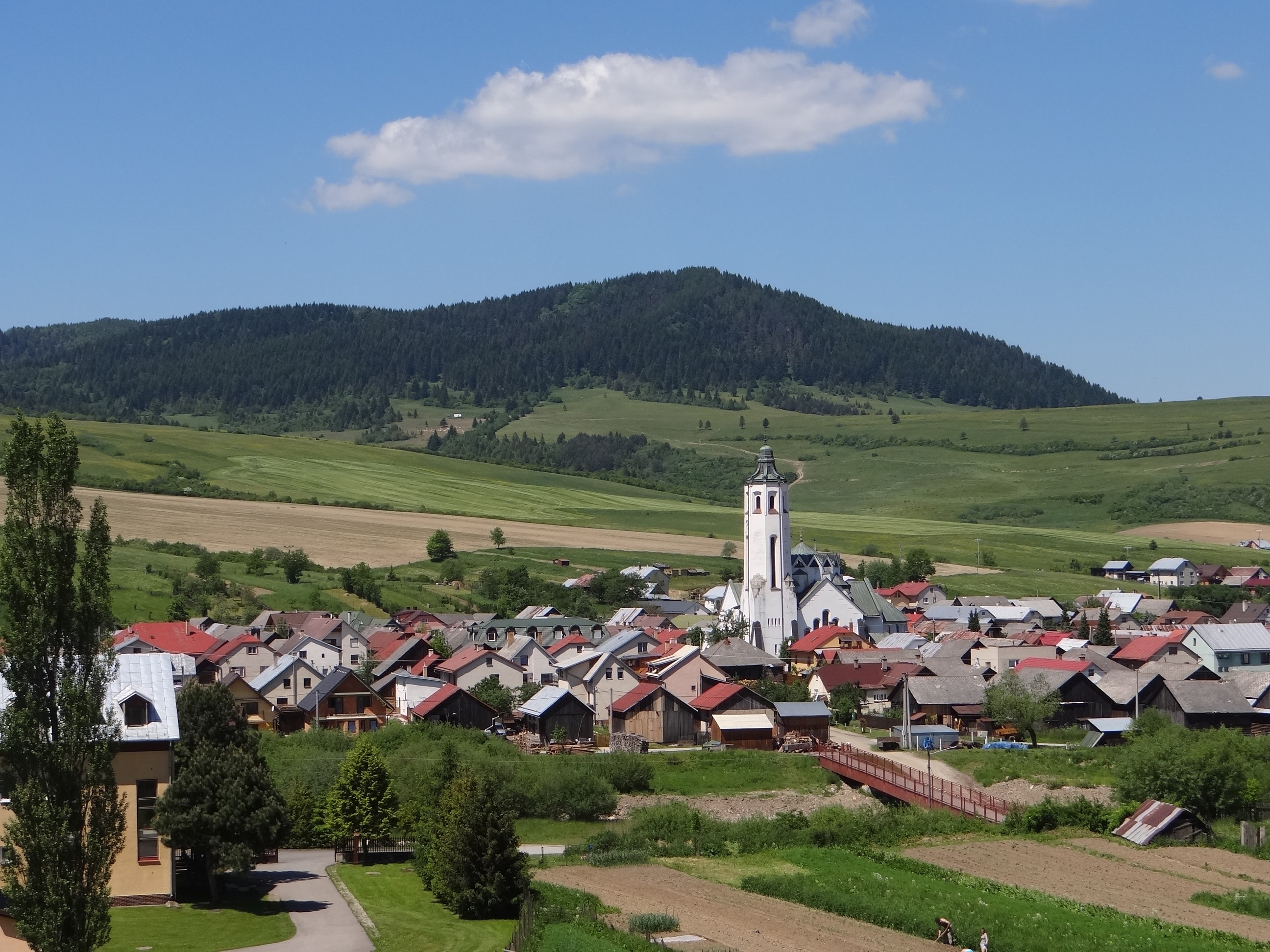

- Flag

- Location of Jakubany in the Prešov Region Location of Jakubany in Slovakia
- Coordinates: 49.25°N 20.70°E
- Country: Slovakia
- Region: Prešov Region
- District: Stará Ľubovňa District
- First mentioned: 1322

Area
  - Total: 16.78 km^{2} (6.48 sq mi)
- Elevation: 613 m (2,011 ft)

Population (2025)
  - Total: 2,927
- Time zone: UTC+1 (CET)
  - Summer (DST): UTC+2 (CEST)
- Postal code: 651 2
- Area code: +421 52
- Vehicle registration plate (until 2022): SL
- Website: www.jakubany.sk

Jakubany (Rusyn: Якубяны, romanized: Jakubjanŷ, Ukrainian: Якуб'яни, romanized: Yakubyany; Hungarian: Szepesjakabfalva) is a village and municipality in Stará Ľubovňa District in the Prešov Region of northern Slovakia.

== History ==
In historical records the village was first mentioned in 1322. Before the establishment of independent Czechoslovakia in 1918, Jakubany was part of Szepes County within the Kingdom of Hungary. From 1939 to 1945, it was part of the Slovak Republic. On 24 January 1945, the Red Army dislodged the Wehrmacht from Jakubany and it was once again part of Czechoslovakia.

== Geography ==
The municipality lies at an altitude of 613 metres (2,011 ft) and covers an area of 16.78 km^{2} (6.48 sq mi) (2025).

== Population ==
Population statistic (10 years)
Year	1995	2005	2015	2025
Count	2250	2493	2750	2927
Difference		+10.8%	+10.30%	+6.43%

Population statistic
Year	2024	2025
Count	2924	2927
Difference		+0.10%

It has a population of 2927 people (31 December 2025).

=== Ethnicity ===
Census 2021 (1+ %)
Ethnicity	Number	Fraction
Slovak	2547	89.65%
Rusyn	860	30.27%
Romani	87	3.06%
Not found out	80	2.81%
Total	2841	

In year 2021 was 2841 people by ethnicity 2547 as Slovak, 860 as Rusyn, 87 as Romani, 80 as Not found out, 8 as Polish, 7 as Other, 4 as Czech, 3 as Russian, 3 as German, 2 as Hungarian, 1 as Irish and 1 as Ukrainian.

Note on population: The difference values of population numbers in the table "Population statistic" and in the sections "Ethnicity" & "Religion" is caused by the use of various statistical methods.

=== Religion ===
Census 2021 (1+ %)
Religion	Number	Fraction
Greek Catholic Church	2533	89.16%
Roman Catholic Church	198	6.97%
None	34	1.2%
Eastern Orthodox Church	30	1.06%
Not found out	29	1.02%
Total	2841	

In year 2021 was 2841 people by religion 2533 from Greek Catholic Church, 198 from Roman Catholic Church, 34 from None, 30 from Eastern Orthodox Church, 29 from Not found out, 8 from Christian Congregations in Slovakia, 4 from Evangelical Church, 2 from Apostolic Church, 1 from Calvinist Church, 1 from Other and not ascertained christian church and 1 from Ad hoc movements.

== Genealogical resources ==
The records for genealogical research are available at the state archive "Statny Archiv in Levoca, Slovakia"

- Roman Catholic church records (births/marriages/deaths): 1635-1920 (parish B)
- Greek Catholic church records (births/marriages/deaths): 1772-1918 (parish A)

== See also ==
- List of municipalities and towns in Slovakia
