= Harold Alan Pincus =

American psychiatrist (born 1951)

Harold Alan Pincus (born January 31, 1951) is the Vice Chair of the Department of Psychiatry at Columbia University’s College of Physicians and Surgeons.

== Education ==
Pincus completed a B.A. at the University of Pennsylvania; an M.D. at Albert Einstein College of Medicine; and a residency at George Washington University Hospital. Then, as a participant in the Robert Wood Johnson Clinical Scholar Program, he served as a congressional fellow in the U.S. House of Representatives and on the President's Commission on Mental Health at the White House.

== Research interests ==
Interests in health services, science policy, and quality improvement led Pincus to create and test models of the interrelationships of general medicine, mental health, and substance abuse, a path that led to some of his current positions: Director of Quality and Outcomes Research at New York-Presbyterian Hospital; Director, Robert Wood Johnson Foundation National Program Depression in Primary Care: Linking Clinical and Systems Strategies; and National Director, Health and Aging Policy Fellows Program, Atlantic Philanthropies.

Pincus also played leadership roles in updating the fourth edition of the Diagnostic and Statistical Manual of Mental Disorders (DSM-IV) and the DSM-IV-TR (text edition)--core classification systems for the diagnosis and classification of psychiatric disorders—and served as a consultant on the World Health Organization’s International Statistical Classification of Diseases and Related Health Problems (ICD-11).

In addition, Pincus has cared for the severely mentally ill at a public mental health clinic one night per week for over twenty years and served on Scientific Council of the National Alliance on Mental Illness.

Pincus has written over 20 books and 300 scientific articles and been honored by many institutions, including the American College of Physicians (the William C. Menninger Memorial Award for distinguished contributions to the science of mental health); American Psychiatric Association (the Health Services Research Senior Scholar Award); and the National Institute of Mental Health and the American Psychiatric Association (the Vestermark Award for contributions to psychiatric education). Columbia University awarded him the Emily Mumford Medal.
