= Live at Bohemian Caverns – Washington, D.C. =

Live album by Les McCann Ltd.
- Released: 1967
- Recorded: August 1967
- Venues: Bohemian Caverns, Washington, DC
- Genre: Jazz
- Labels: Limelight; LM 82046
- Producer: Dick Corby

Les McCann chronology
Bucket o' Grease (1966)	Live at Bohemian Caverns – Washington, D.C. (1967)	Much Les (1968)

Live at Bohemian Caverns – Washington, D.C. is an album by pianist Les McCann recorded at the Bohemian Caverns nightclub and released on the Limelight label.

== Reception ==
Professional ratings
Review scores
Source	Rating
Allmusic	4/5 stars

Allmusic gave the album 4 stars.

== Track listing ==
All compositions by Les McCann except as indicated

1. "The Shout" - 5:30
2. "Goin' Out of My Head" (Bobby Weinstein, Teddy Randazzo) - 2:45
3. "Autumn Leaves" (Joseph Kosma, Jacques Prévert, Johnny Mercer) - 8:18
4. "Nobody Else But Me" (Jerome Kern, Oscar Hammerstein II) - 5:50
5. "Back Home Again in Indiana" (Ballard MacDonald, James F. Hanley) - 6:55
6. "Colonel Rykken's Southern Fried Chicken" - 6:37

== Personnel ==
- Les McCann – piano
- Leroy Vinnegar – double bass
- Frank Severino – drums

Technical

- Reice Hamel – recording engineer
