= One Heartbeat =

Studio album by Smokey Robinson
- Released: February 24, 1987
- Recorded: 1986–1987
- Studio: Conway, with additional recording at Buckman, Power Trax, and Ocean Way
- Genre: R&B, pop rock, adult contemporary
- Length: 38:10
- Label: Motown
- Producer: Peter Bunetta, Rick Chudacoff

Smokey Robinson chronology
Smoke Signals (1986)	One Heartbeat (1987)	Love, Smokey (1990)

One Heartbeat is the fourteenth studio album by American R&B singer-songwriter Smokey Robinson, released in 1987 on Motown Records. This album peaked at No. 26 on the US Billboard 200 and No. 1 on the US Billboard Top R&B Albums chart. One Heartbeat was certified Gold in the US by the RIAA.

== Overview ==
The album contains Robinson's last two US Billboard top 10 singles: "Just to See Her" (which won Robinson a Grammy Award in the category of Best Male R&B Vocal performance) and "One Heartbeat". "What's Too Much" was released as the album's third and final single.

== Critical reception ==
Professional ratings
Review scores
Source	Rating
AllMusic	3/5 stars

Ron Wynn of AllMusic called One Heartbeat "another superb Robinson album." David Wild of Rolling Stone declared, "One Heartbeat is another of Smokey's breathy gems; it's his strongest and most accessible effort since 1982's underrated Touch the Sky.

Robert K. Oermann of USA Today ranked this album at No. 1 on his list of 1987's top 50 R&B albums.

== Track listing ==
1. "Just to See Her" (Jimmy George, Lou Pardini) - 4:04
2. "One Heartbeat" (Brian Ray, Steve LeGassick) - 4:07
3. "It's Time to Stop Shoppin' Around" (Robinson, Marsha Gold) - 4:02
4. "Why Do Happy Memories Hurt So Bad" (Robinson, Marvin Tarplin) - 4:06
5. "You Don't Know What It's Like" (Robinson, Reed Nielsen, Sue Shifrin) - 3:55
6. "What's Too Much" (Robinson, Ivory Stone, Lonnie Kirtz, Pepi Talbert) - 4:23
7. "Love Brought Us Here Tonight" (duet with Syreeta Wright) (Robinson, Stephen Geyer, Allan Rich) - 3:57
8. "Love Don't Give No Reason" (Robinson, Steven Tavani) - 4:25
9. "Keep Me" (Robinson) - 4:58

== Personnel ==
- Smokey Robinson – lead vocals
- Robbie Buchanan – keyboards (1, 2, 4, 5, 8, 9), arrangements (5, 8)
- Lou Pardini – synthesizer solo (1)
- Rick Chudacoff – arrangements (1, 3, 4, 6, 8, 9), synth bass (3), acoustic piano (6)
- Steve LeGassick – keyboards (2), arrangements (2)
- Bill Elliott – keyboards (3)
- Reginald "Sonny" Burke – keyboards (3, 4), acoustic piano solo (6), organ (6)
- Dann Huff – guitars (1, 3–9)
- Brian Ray – guitars (2), drum programming (2), arrangements (2)
- Neil Stubenhaus – bass guitar (1, 4, 9)
- John Robinson – drums (1, 4, 5, 9)
- Peter Bunetta – arrangements (1, 3, 4, 6, 8, 9), drums (3), bass synth programming (6), drum programming (6)
- Brad Buxer – drum programming (6, 7), bass synth programming (6), keyboards (7), synthesizer programming (7), rhythm track arrangements (7)
- Tom Seufert – drum programming (8)
- Paulinho da Costa – percussion (1, 3, 9)
- Kenny G – sax solo (2, 9), soprano sax solo (4)
- Danny Pelfrey – alto saxophone (3)
- Greg Smith – baritone saxophone (3)
- Jerry Jumonville – tenor saxophone (3)
- Bruce Paulsen – trombone (3)
- Darrell Leonard – trumpet (3, 6), horn arrangements (3)
- John Thomas – trumpet (3)
- Jerry Peterson – EWI controller (8)
- Leslie Smith – backing vocals (1, 4, 5)
- Tim Stone – backing vocals (1)
- Patti Henley – backing vocals (2, 4–9)
- Ivory Stone – backing vocals (3, 4–9)
- The Temptations – backing vocals (3)
- Howard Smith – backing vocals (4, 5)
- Alfie Silas – backing vocals (5–9)
- Maxayn Lewis – backing vocals (5)
- Kal David – backing vocals (5)
- Syreeta Wright – lead vocals (7)

Production

- Producers – Peter Bunetta and Rick Chudacoff
- Executive Producer – Berry Gordy
- Coordination – Sharon Burston
- Engineered by Daren Klein
- Additional Recording – Richard McKernan and Frank Wolf
- Assistant Engineers – Troy Krueger, Bob Loftus, Richard McKernan, Marnie Riley and Gary Wagner.
- Mixing – Daren Klein (Tracks 1–9); Mick Guzauski (Tracks 1, 2, 4-7 & 9).
- Art Direction – Johnny Lee
- Design – Andy Engel
- Front Cover Photo – Bonnie Schiffman
- Back Cover Photo – Ron Slenzak

== Charts ==
=== Weekly charts ===
Chart (1987)	Peak position
US Billboard 200	26
US Top R&B/Hip-Hop Albums (Billboard)	1

=== Year-end charts ===
Chart (1987)	Position
US Billboard 200	49
US Top R&B/Hip-Hop Albums (Billboard)	12

== Certifications ==
Region	Certification	Certified units/sales
United States (RIAA)	Gold	500,000^{^}
^{^} Shipments figures based on certification alone.

== Singles ==
Year	Title	US	US R&B	AC	UK
1987	"Just to See Her"	8	2	1	52
1987	"One Heartbeat"	10	3	2	—
