= I Don't Remember Ever Growing Up =

Studio album by Andy Williams
- Released: June 18, 2007
- Recorded: 2006
- Genres: Traditional pop; vocal pop
- Length: 51:25
- Label: Demon Music Group
- Producer: Andy Williams

Andy Williams chronology
Music to Watch Girls By: The Very Best of Andy Williams (2005)	I Don't Remember Ever Growing Up (2007)	Moon River: The Very Best of Andy Williams (2009)

Professional ratings
Review scores
Source	Rating
Allmusic	3/5 stars

I Don't Remember Ever Growing Up is the forty-third and final studio album by American pop singer Andy Williams, released in the UK by the Demon Music Group in 2007. In the liner notes of the album Williams writes, "Over the past few years I have come across songs that I really wanted to record. I picked 13 of my favorites and set out to make a new record." While the title track is the only new song, the other 12 selections were chart hits for other artists or, as is the case with "Desperado" by the Eagles, received critical acclaim without having been released as a single.

== Track listing ==
1. "She's the One" (Karl Wallinger) – 3:52
2. "Have You Ever Really Loved a Woman?" (from Don Juan DeMarco) (Bryan Adams, Michael Kamen, Robert John "Mutt" Lange) – 3:37
3. "Every Breath You Take" (Sting) – 3:43
4. "Have I Told You Lately" (from One Fine Day) (Van Morrison) – 4:18
5. "I Don't Want to Talk About It" (Danny Whitten) – 3:43
6. "I'll Never Break Your Heart" (Eugene Wilde, Albert Manno) – 3:49
7. "Desperado" (Glenn Frey, Don Henley) – 3:31
8. "One Sweet Day" (Walter Afanasieff, Mariah Carey, Michael McCary, Nathan Morris, Wanya Morris, Shawn Stockman) – 4:10
9. "Breaking Up Is Hard to Do" (Howard Greenfield, Neil Sedaka) – 4:44
10. "The Shadow of Your Smile" (from The Sandpiper) (Johnny Mandel, Paul Francis Webster) – 3:31
11. "Just to See Her" (Jimmy George, Lou Pardini) – 3:44
12. "Lady in Red" (from Working Girl) (Chris de Burgh) – 4:02
13. "I Don't Remember Ever Growing Up" (Artie Butler) – 4:41

== Song information ==
Neil Sedaka's first recording of "Breaking Up Is Hard to Do" reached number one on Billboard magazine's Hot 100 in 1962, but on this album Williams pays tribute to Sedaka's much slower 1975 version that went to number one on the magazine's Adult Contemporary chart and got as high as number eight pop. "The Shadow of Your Smile" is the title track from Williams's spring of 1966 release, and "Desperado" comes from the 1973 album of the same name by the Eagles.

== Personnel ==
From the liner notes:

Production

- Artie Butler - arranger (except as noted), supervisor
- Bruce Botnick - engineering, mixing, mastering
- Peter Fuchs - string engineer
- Joe Galante - arranger ("Just to See Her")
- Nick Hazard - arranger ("The Shadow of Your Smile")
- Chad Heasley - lead vocal engineer
- Ken Thorne - arranger ("Have You Ever Really Loved a Woman?", "Every Breath You Take", "One Sweet Day")
- Andy Williams - producer
- Dick Williams - background vocal arranger

Performers

- Chris Botti - trumpet ("The Shadow of Your Smile")
- Bratislava Symphony - strings
- John Cox - piano, keyboard
- Tom Dostal - percussion
- John Goux - guitar
- Tim May - guitar
- John Robinson - drums
- Leland Sklar - bass
- Mike Valerio - bass
- Andy Williams - lead vocal
- Rhythm section and horns recorded at Capitol Studio B in Hollywood, Los Angeles, California
- Strings recorded by the Bratislava Symphony in Bratislava, Slovakia
- Andy Williams's vocals recorded at the Moon River Theatre, Branson, Missouri

== Bibliography ==
- Whitburn, Joel (2004), Joel Whitburn Presents Top R&B/Hip-Hop Singles, 1942-2004, Record Research Inc., ISBN 0-89820-160-8
- Whitburn, Joel (2007), Joel Whitburn Presents Billboard Top Adult Songs, 1961-2006, Record Research Inc., ISBN 978-0-89820-169-7
- Whitburn, Joel (2009), Joel Whitburn's Top Pop Singles, 1955-2008, Record Research Inc., ISBN 978-0-89820-180-2
