= Root Down =

Root Down may refer to:

- Root Down (EP), a 1995 EP by the Beastie Boys
- Root Down (album), a 1972 album by Jimmy Smith
