= Compared to What =

1969 protest song by Gene McDaniels

Song by Les McCann and Eddie Harris

from the album Swiss Movement
- Language: English
- Released: 1969
- Recorded: June 21, 1969
- Venue: Casino Kursaal, Montreux Jazz Festival, Montreux
- Genre: Soul jazz
- Length: 8:41
- Label: Atlantic
- Songwriter: Gene McDaniels
- Producers: Nesuhi Ertegun and Bob Emmer

Official audio
- Compared to What (Live at Montreux Jazz Festival) on YouTube

"Compared to What" is a protest song written by Gene McDaniels. It was recorded by Roberta Flack in February 1969 for her debut album, First Take, but became better known following a performance by Les McCann (piano and vocals) and Eddie Harris (tenor saxophone) at the Montreux Jazz Festival in June of that year. The song appeared as the opening track on their 1969 album Swiss Movement on the Atlantic label, which was certified Gold in sales in the United States. The song has been recorded by more than 270 performers, including Ray Charles and Brian Auger.

== Lyrics ==
"Compared to What" was written by American singer and songwriter Gene McDaniels. It was copyrighted in 1966. Its lyrics have a variety of social commentary. It contains lyrics against the Vietnam War and the then-President of the United States Lyndon B. Johnson with lines: "The president, he's got his war / Folks don't know just what it's for / Nobody gives us rhyme or reason / Have one doubt, they call it treason". Written during the second wave feminist movement before abortion rights became federal law in the US in 1973, its lyrics broached the topic with "unwed mothers need abortion". In 1976, the popular American music critic B. Lee Cooper suggested that the song "of social criticism attacked a variety of social practices as being based on hypocritically 'unreal values'" and contrasted "the social myth of equality and the economic reality of poverty in the stratified American society."

== Original version ==
The first recording appears to have been by American jazz pianist and vocalist Les McCann for his 1966 album Les McCann Plays the Hits.

== Cover versions ==
By 2011, the song had been covered by more than 270 performers, including Ray Charles and saxophonist Ronnie Laws.

=== Roberta Flack ===
Flack recorded the song in February 1969, for her debut album, First Take, and "Compared to What" was her first single. Flack's manager that year was McCann. A contemporary reviewer suggested that her singing was "in a fiery rhythmic way reminiscent of the throbbing motion heard during congregational singing at Southern Baptist churches." Flack's version was included in the 1997 film Boogie Nights and the 2015 film The Man from U.N.C.L.E.

=== McCann-Harris version ===
McCann (piano) and Harris (tenor saxophone) had performed earlier at the 1969 Montreux Jazz Festival and agreed to play together on June 21, 1969, with Benny Bailey (trumpet), Leroy Vinnegar (bass), and Donald Dean (drums). The song was the first of the McCann-Harris set and opens with McCann and Dean playing together. Vinnegar joins in, forming a trio that states the theme. Harris then enters, complementing McCann's piano and vocals. After four verses, Bailey has a solo, then the band plays together until the last verse. This is followed by solos from McCann and Harris, ending the performance. Their version of the song appeared on the album Swiss Movement; the single sold over a million copies and reached No. 35 on Billboard's R&B chart. The single also appeared on the U.S. Cash Box Top 100 for two weeks in January 1970, with a peak position of No. 96.

The commercial success of the McCann-Harris version allowed McDaniels to stop singing in night clubs. The song was later used in the soundtrack for Martin Scorsese's 1995 film Casino.

=== Brian Auger and others ===
In 1973, Brian Auger's Oblivion Express included a recording of the song on their album Closer To It. In 1975, the band performed the song, as their closing number, at San Francisco's Winterland, when the band opened for Fleetwood Mac. Paste magazine described the performance as a "foot-stomping, full-blown funky jazz blowout" and adds: "Auger's bluesy Hammond organ licks have a timeless appeal and he and the group's offbeat humor are apparent throughout." The song was also included on the band's albums Live Oblivion (1975), Best of Brian Auger (1976), and Brian Auger's Oblivion Express – Live at the Baked Potato (2005).
