= Jimmy Crawford (drummer) =

American jazz musician

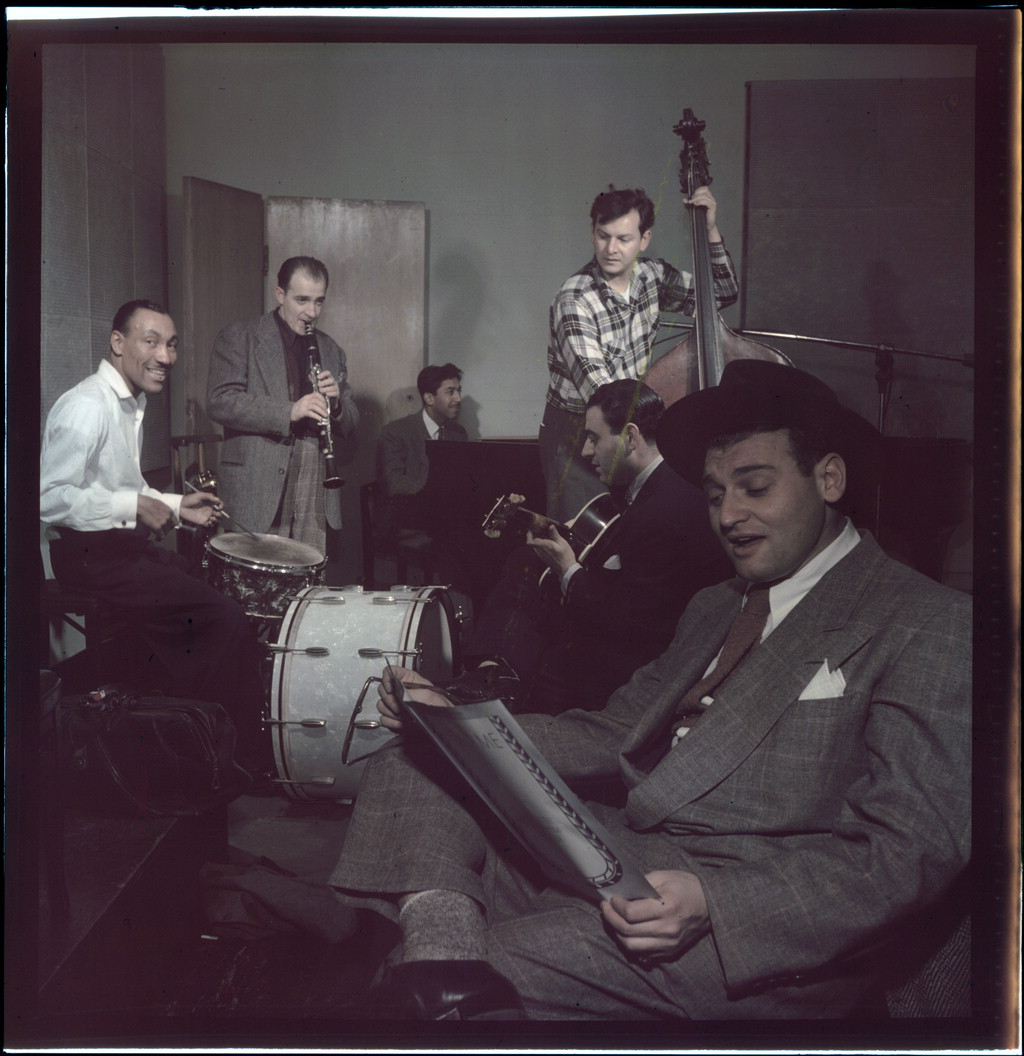
Jimmy Crawford (left) and Frankie Laine, ca. 1947. Photography by William P. Gottlieb.

Jimmy "Craw" Crawford (January 14, 1910 – January 28, 1980) was an American jazz drummer in the swing era.

== Biography ==
Jimmy Crawford was born in Memphis, Tennessee, United States. He was the drummer of the Jimmie Lunceford big band for nearly 14 years from 1928 to 1942. According to Modern Drummer, Crawford "played with a strong, solid pulsation — a classic trademark of the Lunceford sound — and was a key factor in establishing the unique Lunceford beat." Later, in the 1950s, Crawford worked as a pit drummer on Broadway in such productions as Jamaica (1957-8) and Donnybrook! (1961). He recorded with numerous notable artists such as Ella Fitzgerald, Dizzy Gillespie, Count Basie, Sy Oliver, Bing Crosby, Benny Goodman, and Frank Sinatra.

He died on January 28, 1980, in New York City.

== Influences ==
Paul Motian mentioned Crawford as one of his favorite drummers.

== Discography ==
With Buster Bailey

- All About Memphis (Felsted, 1958)

With Count Basie

- Memories Ad-Lib (Roulette, 1958) - with Joe Williams
- String Along with Basie (Roulette, 1960)

With Kenny Burrell

- Bluesin' Around (Columbia, 1961 [1983])

With Buck Clarke

- The Buck Clarke Sound (Argo, 1963)

With Dizzy Gillespie

- Dizzy and Strings (Norgran, 1954)

With Coleman Hawkins

- The Hawk Talks (Decca, 1952-53 [1955])

With Eddie Heywood

- Eddie Heywood (EmArcy, 1955)

With Quincy Jones

- The Birth of a Band! (Mercury, 1959)
- Quincy Plays for Pussycats (Mercury, 1959-65 [1965])
