= Somethin' Special (album) =

Studio album by Richard "Groove" Holmes with Les McCann
- Released: 1962
- Recorded: April 1962
- Studios: Pacific Jazz Studios, Los Angeles, CA
- Genre: Jazz
- Length: 35:08
- Labels: Pacific Jazz; PJ 51
- Producer: Richard Bock

Richard "Groove" Holmes chronology
Groovin' with Jug (1961)	Somethin' Special (1962)	After Hours (1962)

Les McCann chronology
Stormy Monday (1962)	Somethin' Special (1962)	On Time (1962)

Somethin' Special is an album by organist Richard "Groove" Holmes with composer, arranger and pianist Les McCann recorded in 1962 and released on the Pacific Jazz label.

== Reception ==
Professional ratings
Review scores
Source	Rating
AllMusic	3/5 stars

The AllMusic review by Leo Stanley states: "It's a fine, infectious album, highlighted by Holmes and McCann's stylish solo".

== Track listing ==
All compositions by Les McCann except where noted.

1. "Somethin' Special" – 9:10
2. "Black Groove" – 5:43
3. "Me & Groove" – 3:09
4. "Comin' Through the Apple" – 5:15
5. "I Thought I Knew You" – 6:27
6. "Carma" – 5:24
7. "Blow The Man Down" − 5.41
8. "Satin Doll" − 6.01

== Personnel ==
- Richard "Groove" Holmes – organ
- Les McCann – piano
- Joe Splink – alto saxophone, tenor saxophone
- Joe Pass – guitar
- Ron Jefferson – drums
