= Live at Montreux (Les McCann album) =

Live album by Les McCann
- Released: 1973
- Recorded: June 24, 1972
- Venue: Montreux Jazz Festival, Montreux, Switzerland
- Genre: Jazz
- Length: 78:37
- Label: Atlantic; SD 2-312
- Producer: Joel Dorn

Les McCann chronology
Talk to the People (1972)	Live at Montreux (1973)	Layers (1973)

Live at Montreux is an album by pianist Les McCann recorded at the Montreux Jazz Festival in 1972 and released on the Atlantic label.

== Reception ==
Professional ratings
Review scores
Source	Rating
Allmusic	4/5 stars

Allmusic gave the album a 4 stars, stating "Atlantic got enough from McCann's set to put out a hot double album loaded with gritty vocals, gospel-drenched electric piano, cooking instrumentals, plenty of his popular protest songs, and a few new numbers such as the driving "Cochise"".

== Track listing ==
All compositions by Les McCann except as indicated

1. "Cochise" – 6:10
2. "Comment" (Yusuf Rahman, Charles Wright) – 1:27
3. "Price You Gotta Pay to Be Free" (Nat Adderley) – 5:00
4. "What's Going On" (Renaldo Benson, Al Cleveland, Marvin Gaye) – 8:30
5. "North Carolina" – 11:30
6. "Carry on Brother" (Eddie Harris) – 9:30
7. "With These Hands" (Benny Davis, Abner Silver) – 9:35
8. "Compared to What" (Gene McDaniels) – 6:30
9. "Get Yourself Together" (Les McCann, Rev. Bee) – 15:23
10. "Home Again" (Les McCann, Rahsaan Roland Kirk) – 5:02

== Personnel ==
- Les McCann – piano, vocals, clavinet, percussion, miscellaneous instruments
- Jimmy Rowser – bass
- Donald Dean – drums
- Buck Clarke – African drums, percussion
- Rahsaan Roland Kirk – tenor saxophone (tracks 9 & 10)
