= Swiss movement =

Swiss movement may refer to:

- Swiss Movement (album), a jazz album by Les McCann and Eddie Harris.
- Swiss Movement (label), Swiss made watch movements
- Swiss-system tournament, the system used for organizing competitions in some games
