= From the Top of the Barrel =

Live album by Les McCann
- Released: 1967
- Recorded: July 16 & 17 and December 1960; The Bit, Hollywood, CA and The Jazz Workshop, San Francisco, CA
- Genre: Jazz
- Length: 37:17
- Label: Pacific Jazz; PJ 10120
- Producer: Richard Bock

Les McCann chronology
Les McCann Ltd. in San Francisco (1960)	From the Top of the Barrel (1967)	Groove (1961)

From the Top of the Barrel is a live album by pianist Les McCann recorded in 1960 and released on the Pacific Jazz label in 1967. The album features additional tracks from the performances that produced Les McCann Ltd. Plays the Shout and Les McCann Ltd. in San Francisco.

== Reception ==
Professional ratings
Review scores
Source	Rating
Allmusic	3/5 stars

Allmusic gives the album 3 stars.

== Track listing ==
1. "Frankie and Johnny" (Traditional) - 6:10
2. "Medley: But Beautiful/It Could Happen to You" (Jimmy Van Heusen, Johnny Burke) - 7:47
3. "Taking a Chance on Love" (Vernon Duke, John La Touche, Ted Fetter) - 4:23
4. "Love Letters" (Victor Young, Edward Heyman) - 4:06
5. "Three Slaves" (Leroy Vinnegar) - 7:00
6. "On Green Dolphin Street" (Bronisław Kaper, Ned Washington) - 4:55
7. "Set Call: The Champ" (Dizzy Gillespie) - 1:45

== Personnel ==
- Les McCann - piano
- Herbie Lewis (tracks 1–4), Leroy Vinnegar (tracks 5–7) - bass
- Ron Jefferson - drums
