= Les McCann Ltd. in San Francisco =

Live album by Les McCann Ltd.
- Released: 1961
- Recorded: December 1960; The Jazz Workshop, San Francisco, CA
- Genre: Jazz
- Length: 37:17
- Labels: Pacific Jazz; PJ 16
- Producer: Richard Bock

Les McCann chronology
Les McCann Ltd. Plays the Shout (1960)	Les McCann Ltd. in San Francisco (1961)	From the Top of the Barrel (1960)

Les McCann Ltd. in San Francisco is a live album by pianist Les McCann recorded in December 1960 at the Jazz Workshop in San Francisco, CA and released in 1961 on the Pacific Jazz label.

== Reception ==
Professional ratings
Review scores
Source	Rating
Allmusic	4/5 stars

Allmusic gives the album 4 stars.

== Track listing ==
All compositions by Les McCann except as indicated

1. "Oh, Them Golden Gaters" - 3:54
2. "Red Sails in the Sunset" (Hugh Williams, Jimmy Kennedy) - 8:19
3. "Big Jim" - 6:57
4. "I Am in Love" (Cole Porter) - 4:45
5. "Jeepers Creepers" (Harry Warren, Johnny Mercer) - 6:06
6. "Gone On and Get That Church" - 6:03
7. "We'll See Yaw'll After While, Ya Heah" - 1:15

== Personnel ==
- Les McCann - piano
- Herbie Lewis - bass
- Ron Jefferson - drums
- Reice Hamel - recording engineer
