= Leroy Walks Again!! =

Studio album by Leroy Vinnegar
- Released: 1963
- Recorded: August 1, 1962 and March 5, 1963; Contemporary Studio in Los Angeles, CA
- Genre: Jazz
- Length: 40:49
- Label: Contemporary M3608/S7608
- Producer: Lester Koenig

Leroy Vinnegar chronology
Leroy Walks! (1958)	Leroy Walks Again!! (1963)	Jazz's Great "Walker" (1964)

Leroy Walks Again!! is the second album by American jazz bassist Leroy Vinnegar, recorded in 1962 and 1963 and released on the Contemporary label.

== Reception ==
The Allmusic review by Scott Yanow states, "The set helps define the modern mainstream of the early '60s, when cool jazz was being replaced by hard bop".

Professional ratings
Review scores
Source	Rating
Allmusic	4/5 stars
The Rolling Stone Jazz Record Guide	3/5 stars
The Penguin Guide to Jazz Recordings	3/4 stars

== Track listing ==
1. "Hard to Find" (Leroy Vinnegar) - 6:48
2. "Down Under" (Freddie Hubbard) - 4:34
3. "I'll String Along with You" (Al Dubin, Harry Warren) - 4:08
4. "Subway Grate" (Vinnegar) - 5:39
5. "Restin' in Jail" (Les McCann) - 4:26
6. "Motherland" (Don Nelson) - 5:36
7. "For Carl" (Vinnegar) - 5:58
8. "Wheelin' and Dealin'" (Teddy Edwards) - 4:11
- Recorded at Contemporary Studio in Los Angeles, CA on August 1, 1962 (tracks 1, 3, 4 & 6) and March 5, 1963 (tracks 2, 5, 7 & 8)

== Personnel ==
- Leroy Vinnegar - bass
- Freddy Hill - trumpet
- Teddy Edwards - tenor saxophone
- Victor Feldman - vibraphone, piano (tracks 1, 3, 4 & 6)
- Roy Ayers - vibraphone (tracks 2, 5, 7 & 8)
- Mike Melvoin - piano (tracks 2, 5, 7 & 8)
- Ron Jefferson (tracks 1, 3, 4 7 6), Milt Turner (tracks 2, 5, 7 & 8) - drums
