= Jimmy George (musician) =

- Also known as: Jimmy Georgantonis
- Born: February 27, 1940 (age 86); Amarillo, Texas
- Years active: 1960s–present

Pete Demetre Georgantonis (born 27 February 1940 in Amarillo, Texas), known as Jimmy George or Jimmy Georgantonis, is an American composer, arranger, guitarist, singer, and producer who, since 1965, has been active in pop, jazz fusion, and rock — in live venues, recording studios, cinema, and TV production. As a sideman, he has toured with The Beach Boys, Shaun Cassidy, Dobie Gray, and Leif Garrett. As an artist, he has recorded with Mercury Records, 1960–1969 and Viva Records (1969). Since the 1960s, George has been a studio musician on dozens of records, commercials, and a few films. From 1965 to 1970, George was a staff composer for United Artists. From 1970 to 1975, he was a staff composer for Motown Records.

== Selected compositions ==
- "Rockin Rocket", with Carlo Mastrangelo, (1960) Billed as Carlo and Jimmy, Laurie 3061
- "I'd Rather Be a Has-Been (Than a Wanna Be)," words & music by George & Jimmy Stallings (born 1942) (© 1997)
- "It's In Your Eyes," by George (© 1969)
- "Magic man," words & music by Ray Dewey, George, Robert Winters, & Lloyd Chiate (© 1979)
- "Stay With Me a While," words & music by Jack Goga & George (© 1976)
- "Look What Your Money's Done," by George (© 1985)
- "Girls' Night Out," by George (© 1985)
- "Got Me Dancin'," by George (© 1985)
- "I Just Love You," / music by George, words by James B. Auspitz (born 1940) (© 1985)
- "I'll Always Love You" / music & lyrics by George (© 1988)
- "Love of My Life," / music & lyrics George & James B. Auspitz (born 1940) (© 1988)
- "Winning Streak," by George (© 1985)
- "Yank My Chain," by George (© 1985)
- "I Can't Stop Lovin' You," words & music by George & Gary John Chase (born 1952) (© 1996)
- "It's a Jungle Out There" (© 1990)
- "Lifetime Guarantee," words & music by George & Vic Carroll (© 1998)
- "She Makes Me Feel So Good," words & music by George, Kris Kellow (born 1967), & Wayne Arnold (born 1950) (© 1990)
- "Wastin' My Lovin' On You," words & music by George & Thomas Dawson (born 1958) (© 1996)
- "Your Wish Is My Command," words & music by George & Thomas Dawson (born 1958) (© 1996)
- "Ain't No Doubt About It," words by Stephanie Spruill, music by George (© 1991)
- "All The More Reason," words & music by Patti Dahlstrom & Jimmy George (© 1991)
- "Is This The Thanks I Get?" words by George, music by John Franklin Hammond (born 1941) (© 1998)
- "Give It Up"
- "Fine Young Girl"
- "Tend to Business" ("That's the way to tend to business") (© 1965)
- "Better Believe Me"

Co-Composed with Dobie Gray

- "In Hollywood"
- "No Room To Cry"
- "Mr. Engineer"
- "Broken In Two"
- "Monkey Jerk"
- "Walk With Love"

Co-composed with Louis Joseph Pardini

- "Don't Stop the Music" (© 1986)
- "Feel This Way" (© 1986)
- "Just to See Her" (© 1987)
- "Messin' With Fire" (© 1987)
- "If I Had Another Chance" (© 1988)
- "Be Gentle With Me" (© 1994)
- "Night 2 Remember" (© 1994)
- "Unconditional Love" (© 1994)
- "Dance With Me" (© 1994)
- "Live and Let Live" (© 1994)
- "I Believe In You" (© 1995)
- "My World Revolves Around You" (© 1995)
- "Some Things Never Change" (© 1995)
- "Better Late Than Never" (© 1996)
- "All Talk and No Show" (© 2001)
- "At The End Of The Day" ("I Will Still Be In Love With You") (© 2001)

Co-composed with Mark McMillen (born 1952)

- "Back In My Bed" (© 1997)
- "Dreams Do Come True" (© 1997)
- "Makin' Love to You" (© 1997)

== Discography ==
With Les McCann

- Les McCann Plays the Hits (Limelight, 1966)
- Bucket o' Grease (Limelight, 1967)
- I GIVE MY HEART TO YOU- WITH CHARLES WALLERT

Co-composed with Mark McMillen

- Back In My Bed (1997)
- Dreams Do Come True (1997)
- Makin' Love To You (1997)
