= Second Movement =

Studio album by Eddie Harris and Les McCann
- Released: 1971
- Recorded: January 25, 1971
- Studio: Atlantic, New York City
- Genre: Jazz
- Length: 38:35
- Label: Atlantic; SD 1583
- Producer: Arif Mardin

Eddie Harris chronology
Live at Newport (1970)	Second Movement (1971)	Instant Death (1971)

Les McCann chronology
Comment (1970)	Second Movement (1971)	Invitation to Openness (1972)

Second Movement is an album by American jazz saxophonist Eddie Harris and pianist/vocalist Les McCann, recorded in 1971 and released on the Atlantic label. The album was a follow-up to the duo's highly successful live collaboration, Swiss Movement (Atlantic, 1969).

== Reception ==
Professional ratings
Review scores
Source	Rating
AllMusic	4/5 stars
The Rolling Stone Jazz Record Guide	3/5 stars

Though panned on its release, today AllMusic calls the album "a gem that continues to inspire a new generation of soul/jazz musicians".

== Track listing ==
All compositions by Eddie Harris except as indicated

1. "Shorty Rides Again" (Harris, Les McCann) – 8:31
2. "Universal Prisoner" (Harris, McCann) – 5:00
3. "Carry On Brother" – 7:11
4. "Set Us Free" – 10:26
5. "Samia" (McCann) – 7:32

== Personnel ==
- Eddie Harris – tenor saxophone
- Les McCann – electric piano, vocals
- Cornell Dupree – electric guitar
- Jimmy Rowser – bass
- Jerry Jemmott – electric bass (tracks 1–3)
- Donald Dean – drums
- Buck Clarke – African drums, percussion
- Bernard Purdie – tambourine, drums
- Judy Clay, Cissy Houston, Rennelle Stafford, Deidre Tuck – vocals
- Unidentified string section arranged by Arif Mardin (track 2)
- Unidentified horns and woodwinds (tracks 4 & 5)
