= Comment (album) =

Studio album by Les McCann
- Released: 1970
- Recorded: August 19–22 and October 22, 1969
- Studio: Atlantic Studios and Regent Sound Studios, New York
- Genre: Jazz
- Length: 32:37
- Label: Atlantic; SD 1547
- Producer: Joel Dorn

Les McCann chronology
Swiss Movement (1969)	Comment (1970)	Second Movement (1971)

Comment is an album by pianist/vocalist Les McCann recorded in 1969 and released on the Atlantic label.

== Reception ==
Professional ratings
Review scores
Source	Rating
Allmusic	3/5 stars

Allmusic gives the album 3 stars stating "The godfather of contemporary jazz-soul chills, changing the pace from his electrifying collaborations with Eddie Harris – Swiss Movement and Second Movement – that preceded and followed this mellow set of mostly love songs".

== Track listing ==
All compositions by Helen Lewis and Kay Lewis except as indicated

1. "How Many Broken Wings" – 3:30
2. "Can't We Be Strangers Again" – 5:09
3. "Unless It's You" (Morgan Ames, Johnny Mandel) – 5:01
4. "What I Call Soul" – 4:11
5. "Comment" (Yusuf Rahman, Charles Wright) – 5:27
6. "Baby, Baby" – 2:52
7. "Yours Is My Heart Alone" (Franz Lehár, Fritz Löhner-Beda, Ludwig Herzer) – 6:27

== Personnel ==
- Les McCann – piano, electric piano, vocals
- Jimmy Owens, Joe Wilder, Richard Williams – trumpet (tracks 2, 4 & 6)
- Dick Griffin, Benny Powell – trombone (tracks 2, 4 & 6)
- Seldon Powell – soprano saxophone, alto flute (track 3)
- Richard Landry – baritone saxophone (tracks 2, 4 & 6)
- Roberta Flack – vocals, piano (tracks 1 & 2)
- Junior Mance, (track 6), Richard Tee (track 4) – piano
- Roland Hanna – harpsichord (track 3)
- Margaret Ross – harp (track 3)
- Billy Butler – guitar (track 5)
- Ron Carter – bass (tracks 1–3, 6 & 7), electric bass (tracks 4 & 5)
- Billy Cobham (tracks 1–4, 6 & 7), Donald Dean (track 5) – drums
- Unidentified vocal group conducted by Valerie Simpson (track 2)
- William Fischer – arrangement, director (tracks 1–3, 6 & 7)
- Selwart Clarke – concertmaster (tracks 1, 3 & 7)
- Clarence Cooper, Greer V. Brown, Barbara Brown, Diane Gabay, Dennis DeVitt, Denisia Frey, Paula Roberts, Francesca Michaelides, Loretta Ritter, Jamie Mulligan, Terre Nappi, Anna Barnes, Jane Fischer, Aeuie Draper, Gene McD, Susan McD, Patricia Mulligan – choir (track 7)
