= Music to Watch Girls By: The Very Best of Andy Williams =

Compilation album by Andy Williams
- Released: 2005
- Recorded: 1958–1973, 2002
- Genre: Traditional pop; vocal pop; standards; AM Pop; early pop/rock; soft rock; film music; soundtracks
- Label: Sony Music Entertainment

Andy Williams chronology
B Sides and Rarities (2003)	Music to Watch Girls By: The Very Best of Andy Williams (2005)	I Don't Remember Ever Growing Up (2007)

Music to Watch Girls By: The Very Best of Andy Williams is a compilation album by American pop singer Andy Williams, released by Sony Music Entertainment in 2005.

The compilation debuted on the UK albums chart on July 9, 2005, remaining on the chart for two weeks, peaking at number 50.

== Track listing ==
1. "Music to Watch Girls By" (Tony Velona, Sid Ramin) – 2:38
2. "Can't Get Used to Losing You" (Jerome "Doc" Pomus, Mort Shuman) – 2:25
3. "Moon River" from Breakfast at Tiffany's (Henry Mancini, Johnny Mercer) – 2:46
4. "Can't Take My Eyes Off You" (Bob Crewe, Bob Gaudio) – 3:15
5. "On the Street Where You Live" from My Fair Lady (Alan Jay Lerner, Frederick Loewe) – 3:12
6. "Up, Up and Away" (Jimmy Webb) – 2:36
7. "House of Bamboo" (William Crompton, Norman Murrells) – 2:06
8. "Happy Heart" (James Last, Jackie Rae) – 3:15
9. "Born Free" from Born Free (Don Black, John Barry) – 2:27
10. "Spooky" (Buddy Buie, James B. Cobb Jr., Harry Middlebrooks, Mike Shapiro) – 3:18
11. "The Impossible Dream (The Quest)" from Man of La Mancha (Joe Darion, Mitch Leigh) – 2:39
12. "Unchained Melody" (Hy Zaret, Alex North) – 3:16
13. "Can't Help Falling in Love" (Luigi Creatore, Hugo Peretti, George David Weiss) – 3:15
14. "Somethin' Stupid" (C. Carson Parks) – 2:59
15. "Raindrops Keep Fallin' on My Head" from Butch Cassidy and the Sundance Kid (Burt Bacharach, Hal David) – 3:11
16. "I Think I Love You" (Tony Romeo) – 2:42
17. "The Look of Love" from Casino Royale (Bacharach, David) – 2:55
18. "We've Only Just Begun" (Roger Nichols, Paul Williams) – 3:15
19. "Aquarius/Let the Sunshine In" from Hair; performed with The Osmond Brothers (Galt MacDermot, James Rado, Gerome Ragni) – 3:51
20. "It's So Easy" (Dor Lee, Dave Watkins) – 2:29
21. "Wives and Lovers" (Bacharach, David) – 2:20
22. "Days of Wine and Roses" from Days of Wine and Roses (Mancini, Mercer) – 2:48
23. "Stranger on the Shore" (Acker Bilk) – 2:50
24. "Solitaire" (Phil Cody, Neil Sedaka) – 4:22
25. "May Each Day" from The Andy Williams Show (Mort Green, George Wyle) – 2:54
26. "Can't Take My Eyes Off You" performed with Denise van Outen (Crewe, Gaudio) – 3:43
