= Layers (Les McCann album) =

Studio album by Les McCann
- Released: 1973
- Recorded: November 1972; Regent Sound Studios, New York
- Genre: Jazz-funk
- Length: 44:02
- Labels: Atlantic; SD 1646, 32 Groove
- Producer: Joel Dorn

Les McCann chronology
Live at Montreux (1972)	Layers (1973)	Another Beginning (1974)

Layers is an album by pianist Les McCann recorded in 1972 and released on the Atlantic label.

== Reception ==
Professional ratings
Review scores
Source	Rating
AllMusic	4.5/5 stars

AllMusic gives the album 4½ stars, stating "This groundbreaking jazz synthesizer record is really unlike any other Les McCann ever made. Aside from a three-man percussion section and electric bassist Jimmy Rowser, Layers is entirely electronic, one of the first jazz albums with such an emphasis. ...this music is truly forward-looking and ahead of its time".

The song "Sometimes I Cry" has been sampled in several other songs, most notably in Slick Rick's "Behind Bars" and its drum beat in Massive Attack's "Teardrop" and "Bullet Boy".

== Track listing ==
All compositions by Les McCann

1. "Sometimes I Cry" - 5:22
2. "Let's Gather" - 1:13
3. "Anticipation" - 0:52
4. "The Dunbar High School Marching Band" - 6:07
5. "Soaring (At Dawn) Part I"- 5:54
6. "The Harlem Buck Dance Strut" - 5:55
7. "Interlude" - 0:33
8. "Before I Rest" - 3:43
9. "Let's Play ('til Mom Calls)" - 4:26
10. "It Never Stopped in My Home Town" - 1:54
11. "Soaring (At Sunset) Part II" - 8:03

== Personnel ==
- Les McCann - piano, electric piano, synthesizer, clavinet, drums, timpani
- Jimmy Rowser - bass, electric bass, bells, percussion
- Donald Dean - drums, bells, percussion
- Buck Clarke - congas, drums, bongos, blocks, bells, percussion
- Ralph MacDonald - congas, bells, percussion
