= Bluesmith =

Studio album by Jimmy Smith
- Released: 1972
- Recorded: September 11, 1972
- Genre: Jazz-funk, jazz fusion
- Length: 42:33
- Label: Verve V6-8809
- Producer: Eric Miller

Jimmy Smith chronology
Root Down (1972)	Bluesmith (1972)	Portuguese Soul (1973)

Bluesmith is a 1972 jazz album by Jimmy Smith, released on the Verve label.

== Reception ==
Professional ratings
Review scores
Source	Rating
Allmusic	4.5/5 stars

Allmusic awarded the album four and a half stars, with reviewer Scott Yanow writing that it was "...ironic that one of Jimmy Smith's best Verve releases would be his next-to-last for the label." Yanow also commented that it was a "surprisingly freewheeling but relaxed jam session" and "Fine straight-ahead music."

== Track listing ==
All compositions by Jimmy Smith unless otherwise noted

1. "Straight Ahead" (Oliver Nelson, Jimmy Smith) - 5:25
2. "Absolutely Funky" - 9:12
3. "Lolita" - 6:23
4. "Mournin' Wes" (Harvey Siders) - 10:00
5. "Blues for 3+1" - 4:52
6. "Bluesmith" - 6:41

== Personnel ==
- Jimmy Smith - Electric organ
- Teddy Edwards - tenor saxophone
- Ray Crawford - guitar
- Leroy Vinnegar - double bass
- Victor Pantoja - Congas
- Donald Dean - drums

Production

- Harvey Siders - liner notes
- Ken Veeder - photography
- Ed Greene, Louis Peters - engineer
- Eric Miller - producer
- Eddie Ray - executive producer
