= Les McCann Ltd. Plays the Shout =

Live album by Les McCann Ltd.
- Released: 1960
- Recorded: July 16 & 17, 1960; The Bit, Hollywood, CA
- Genre: Jazz
- Length: 39:20
- Label: Pacific Jazz; PJ 7
- Producer: Richard Bock

Les McCann chronology
Les McCann Ltd. Plays the Truth (1960)	Les McCann Ltd. Plays the Shout (1960)	Les McCann Ltd. in San Francisco (1960)

Les McCann Ltd. Plays the Shout (also referred to as The Shout) is a live album by pianist Les McCann recorded in 1960 and released on the Pacific Jazz label.

== Reception ==
Professional ratings
Review scores
Source	Rating
Allmusic	4/5 stars

Allmusic gives the album 4 stars.

== Track listing ==
1. "But Not for Me" (George Gershwin, Ira Gershwin) - 6:10
2. "A Foggy Day" (Gershwin, Gershwin) - 8:10
3. "The Shout" (Les McCann) - 4:50
4. "Set Call: Sonar" (Gerald Wiggins) - 1:03
5. "C Jam Blues" (Duke Ellington) - 7:06
6. "Jubilation" (Junior Mance) - 3:25
7. "A Night in Tunisia" (Dizzy Gillespie, Frank Papparelli) - 4:50
8. "Set Call: Cute" (Neil Hefti) - 2:32

== Personnel ==
- Les McCann - piano
- Leroy Vinnegar - bass
- Ron Jefferson - drums
