= Talk to the People =

Studio album by Les McCann
- Released: 1972
- Recorded: March 30, 1972; Regent Sound Studios
- Genre: Jazz, Soul
- Length: 44:05
- Label: Atlantic; SD 1619
- Producer: Joel Dorn

Les McCann chronology
Invitation to Openness (1972)	Talk to the People (1972)	Live at Montreux (1973)

Talk to the People is an album by pianist Les McCann recorded in 1972 and released on the Atlantic label.

== Reception ==
Professional ratings
Review scores
Source	Rating
Allmusic	4/5 stars

Allmusic gives the album 4 stars, stating: "Although there are some weak links in this chain of tunes, the highs are sky-high, and they represent some of McCann's peak studio performances."

== Track listing ==
All compositions by Les McCann except as indicated

1. "What's Going On" (Renaldo Benson, Al Cleveland, Marvin Gaye) – 7:28
2. "Shamading" – 3:41
3. "Seems So Long" (Stevie Wonder) – 3:04
4. "She's Here" – 5:54
5. "North Carolina" – 9:20
6. "Let It Lay" (Les McCann, Rev. Bee) – 5:22
7. "Talk to the People" – 9:16

== Personnel ==
- Les McCann – piano, vocals
- Keith Loving – guitar
- James Rowser – bass
- Donald Dean – drums
- Buck Clarke – percussion
- The Persuasions (track 1), Eugene McDaniels (tracks 3, 6 & 7), Susan McDaniels (tracks 3, 6 & 7), Sister Charlotte (tracks 3, 6 & 7), Billy Barnes (tracks 3, 6 & 7), Joel Dorn (tracks 3, 6 & 7) – background vocals
