= One Heartbeat (song) =

Single by Smokey Robinson

from the album One Heartbeat
- B-side: "Love Will Set You Free"
- Released: June 1987
- Genre: R&B, pop
- Length: 4:07
- Label: Motown
- Songwriters: Brian Ray, Steve LeGassick
- Producers: Peter Bunetta, Rick Chudacoff

Smokey Robinson singles chronology
"Just to See Her" (1987)	"One Heartbeat" (1987)	"What's Too Much" (1987)

"One Heartbeat" is the second single released by Smokey Robinson from his 1987 album of the same name. The song reached No. 10 on the Billboard Hot 100, No. 3 on the R&B singles chart, and No. 2 on the Adult Contemporary chart.

It was accompanied by a music video filmed in Southern California. The song was written by musician Brian Ray along with one-time Tommy Tutone keyboardist Steve LeGassick. The B-side, "Love Will Set You Free", is from the 1986 film Solarbabies.

The song was heard in the opening credits of the 1987 romantic comedy film Cross My Heart starring Martin Short and Annette O'Toole.

== Charts ==
=== Weekly charts ===
Chart (1987)	Peak position
US Billboard Hot 100	10
US Adult Contemporary (Billboard)	2
US Hot R&B/Hip-Hop Songs (Billboard)	3

=== Year-end charts ===
Chart (1987)	Position
US Adult Contemporary (Billboard)	13
US Hot R&B/Hip-Hop Songs (Billboard)	27
