= Soul Hits =

Studio album by Les McCann Ltd.
- Released: 1963
- Recorded: October 29 & 30, 1963; Pacific Jazz Studios, Hollywood, CA
- Genre: Jazz
- Length: 34:14
- Label: Pacific Jazz; PJ 78
- Producer: Richard Bock

Les McCann chronology
The Gospel Truth (1963)	Soul Hits (1963)	Jazz Waltz (1964)

Soul Hits is an album by pianist Les McCann recorded in 1963 and released on the Pacific Jazz label.

== Reception ==
Professional ratings
Review scores
Source	Rating
Allmusic	4/5 stars

Allmusic gives the album 4 stars.

== Track listing ==
1. "Back at the Chicken Shack" (Jimmy Smith) - 3:58
2. "Sack O' Woe" (Cannonball Adderley) - 3:06
3. "Groove Yard" (Carl Perkins) - 3:17
4. "Sermonette" (Nat Adderley) - 2:30
5. "Sonnymoon for Two" (Sonny Rollins) - 2:38
6. "Bags' Groove" (Milt Jackson) - 3:00
7. "Shiny Silk Stockings" (Frank Foster) - 3:55
8. "Sister Sadie" (Horace Silver) - 4:02
9. "Li'l Darlin'" (Neal Hefti) - 3:38
10. "Work Song" (Nat Adderley) - 4:10

== Personnel ==
- Les McCann - piano
- Joe Pass - guitar
- Paul Chambers - bass
- Paul Humphrey - drums
