= Les McCann Plays the Hits =

Studio album by Les McCann
- Released: 1966
- Recorded: August 5 and September 9, 1966
- Studio: United (Hollywood); Bell Sound (New York City)
- Genre: Jazz
- Length: 38:57
- Label: Limelight; LM 82041
- Producer: Jerry Ross

Les McCann chronology
| Live at Shelly's Manne-Hole (1966) | Les McCann Plays the Hits (1966) | Bucket o' Grease (1966) |

Les McCann Plays the Hits is an album by American pianist Les McCann recorded in 1966 and released on the Limelight label.

== Reception ==
Professional ratings
Review scores
| Source | Rating |
|---|---|
| Allmusic | 3/5 stars |

AllMusic gives the album 3 stars.

== Track listing ==
1. "Sunny (part 1)" (Bobby Hebb) – 7:07
2. "Sunny (part 2)" (Hebb) – 2:40
3. "Guantanamera" (José Martí) – 2:55
4. "Summer Samba (So Nice)" (Marcos Valle, Paulo Sérgio Valle, Norman Gimbel) – 2:22
5. "Sad Little Girl" (Les McCann) – 2:55
6. "River Deep – Mountain High" (Jeff Barry, Ellie Greenwich, Phil Spector) – 3:16
7. "Les Skate" (Jerry Ross, Mark Barkan) – 3:19
8. "Sunshine Superman" (Donovan) – 3:06
9. "Message to Michael" (Burt Bacharach, Hal David) – 2:52
10. "Flamingo" (Ted Grouya, Edmund Anderson) – 2:35
11. "Compared to What" (Gene McDaniels) – 2:33
12. "Pretty Flamingo" (Barkan) – 3:17

== Personnel ==
- Les McCann – piano, vocals
- Seldon Powell – tenor saxophone, flute (tracks 1, 3, 4 & 7–12)
- Plas Johnson (tracks 2, 5 & 6), Jerome Richardson (tracks 1, 3, 4 & 7–12) – tenor saxophone
- Lynn Blessing (tracks 2, 5 & 6), Warren Chiasson (tracks 1, 3, 4 & 7–12) – vibraphone
- Vincent Bell (tracks 1, 3, 4 & 7–12), Jimmy Georgantones (tracks 2, 5 & 6), Carl Lynch (tracks 1, 3, 4 & 7–12) – guitar
- Leroy Vinnegar – bass
- Joe Macho – Fender bass (tracks 1, 3, 4 & 7–12)
- Booker T. Robinson – drums
- Johnny Pacheco (tracks 1, 3, 4 & 7–12), Ron Rich (tracks 2, 5 & 6) – congas
