= On Time (Les McCann album) =

Studio album by Les McCann Ltd.
- Released: 1962
- Recorded: May 17, June 22 and August 20, 1962; Pacific Jazz Studios, Hollywood, CA
- Genre: Jazz
- Length: 40:20
- Label: Pacific Jazz; PJ 56
- Producer: Richard Bock

Les McCann chronology
Somethin' Special (1962)	On Time (1962)	The Gospel Truth (1963)

On Time is an album by pianist Les McCann recorded in 1962 and released on the Pacific Jazz label. It was McCann's first album to feature guitarist Joe Pass.

== Reception ==
Professional ratings
Review scores
Source	Rating
AllMusic	4.5/5 stars

Allmusic gives the album 4½ stars.

== Track listing ==
All compositions by Les McCann except as indicated

1. "On Time" - 4:14
2. "Yours Is My Heart Alone" (Franz Lehár, Fritz Löhner-Beda, Ludwig Herzer) - 4:45
3. "This for Doug" (Ron Jefferson) - 5:35
4. "Fondue" - 5:12
5. "Bernie's Tune" (Bernie Miller) - 3:02
6. "Maichen" (Leroy Vinnegar) - 4:34
7. "It Could Happen To You" (Jimmy Van Heusen, Johnny Burke) - 5:00
8. "You're Driving Me Crazy" (Walter Donaldson) - 4:58
9. "So What" (Miles Davis) - 3:00

== Personnel ==
- Les McCann - piano
- Joe Pass - guitar
- Leroy Vinnegar - bass
- Ron Jefferson - drums
