= Stormy Monday (Lou Rawls album) =

Studio album by Lou Rawls
- Released: 1962
- Recorded: February 5–12, 1962
- Studio: Capitol (Los Angeles)
- Genre: R&B, vocal jazz
- Length: 40:49 (Original LP); 45:34 (CD reissue)
- Label: Capitol; 1714
- Producer: Nick Venet

Lou Rawls chronology
| Stormy Monday (1962) | Black and Blue (1963) |

Reissue cover
- Blue Note reissue cover

Professional ratings
Review scores
| Source | Rating |
|---|---|
| AllMusic | 4.5/5 stars |

Stormy Monday, also known as I'd Rather Drink Muddy Water, is the debut album of R&B singer Lou Rawls, released in 1962 on Capitol Records. Recorded in two sessions in February 1962, the album features a number of blues and jazz standards chosen by Rawls and backed by the Les McCann Trio. Stormy Monday was reissued in 1990 by Blue Note records.

== History ==
Excerpt from the album liner notes:

In 1962, when this album was made and when he turned 26, Lou Rawls' rich baritone was unknown, except to a few gospel music fans and Hollywood hipsters who caught his act at local night clubs like P.J.'s, The Troubador, Shelly Manne's Manne-Hole or Brother's on Santa Monica and Vine. A year earlier, Capitol A&R man Nick Venet had heard Rawls at Pandora's Box Coffee Shop, where Rawls was playing there for $10 a night plus pizza in late 1959, and signed him to the label. One stillborn single emerged before Lou had the brainstorm to do an album of blues and jazz standards, backed by then up-and-comer Les McCann and his trio, who were performing nearby at The Bit on Sunset Boulevard. Before his Grammy-winning album Love Is a Hurtin' Thing, Stormy Monday was the first of more than 20 other albums Rawls would record on that label in only a decade.

== Track listing ==
=== Side One ===
1. "(They Call It) Stormy Monday" (T-Bone Walker) – 3:45
2. "God Bless the Child" (Arthur Herzog, Billie Holiday) – 4:30
3. "See See Rider" (Ma Rainey) – 3:11
4. "Willow Weep for Me" (Ann Ronell) – 5:57
5. "I'm Gonna Move to the Outskirts of Town" (Andy Razaf, "Casey Bill" Weldon) – 4:00

=== Side Two ===
1. "In the Evening (When the Sun Goes Down)" (Leroy Carr, Don Raye) – 3:28
2. "'Tain't Nobody's Biz-Ness If I Do" (Percy Grainger, Robert Prince, Clarence Williams) – 2:45
3. "Lost and Lookin'" (James Alexander, Lowell Jordan) – 3:12
4. "I'd Rather Drink Muddy Water" (Eddie Miller) – 3:55
5. "Sweet Lover" (John Leslie McFarland, Sid Wyche) – 3:08

=== Reissue Tracks ===
1. "Blues Is a Woman" (Rawls) - 2:58
2. "A Little Les of Lou's Blues" (Rawls) - 2:23
3. "(They Call It) Stormy Monday (Alternate Take)" (Walker) - 2:58

== Personnel ==
=== Musicians ===
- Lou Rawls - vocals

Les McCann Trio

- Les McCann - piano
- Leroy Vinnegar - bass
- Ron Jefferson - drums

=== Additional personnel ===
- Nick Venet - producer
- Malcolm Addley - remixing
- Billy Vera - liner notes
