= The Buck Clarke Sound =

Studio album by Buck Clarke
- Released: 1963
- Recorded: November 17 & 19, 1961
- Venue: Washington Jewish Community Center, Washington, D.C.
- Genre: Jazz
- Label: Argo; LP 4021
- Producer: Buck Clarke, Burt Burdeen

Buck Clarke chronology
Drum Sum (1961)	The Buck Clarke Sound (1963)	Hot Stuff (1988)

The Buck Clarke Sound is the third album by American jazz percussionist Buck Clarke. The album was released in 1963.

== Reception ==
Professional ratings
Review scores
Source	Rating
AllMusic	2/5 stars

AllMusic rated the album 2 stars.

== Track listing ==
All tracks composed by Charles Hampton; except where indicated

1. "Rev. Hamp" – 3:03
2. "I Can't Get Started" (Ira Gershwin, Vernon Duke) – 3:28
3. "Night in Tunisia" (Dizzy Gillespie, Frank Paparelli) – 5:39
4. "Couldn't You" – 5:45
5. "Desert Sands" (LeRoy Smith) – 3:09
6. "Feel" – 6:18
7. "One Mint Julep" (Rudolph Toombs) – 2:40
8. "Rene" – 4:40

== Personnel ==
- Dwayne Austin – bass
- Buck Clarke – bongos, congas
- Billy Hart – drums
- Charles Hampton – flute, alto saxophone, piano
- Jimmy Crawford – piano (tracks: 2, 3, 5)
- Lennie Cujé – vibraphone, marimba

Production notes:

- Phil Chess - recording supervisor
- Wallace Conway - cover design
- Burt Burdeen – producer, liner notes

== Uses in other media ==
The song "Feel" was sampled in a track called "Worldwide" by hip hop duo Pete Rock & CL Smooth from the 1994's The Main Ingredient album.
