= High Voltage (Eddie Harris album) =

Live album by Eddie Harris
- Released: 1969
- Recorded: October 28, 1968 and April 19, 1969
- Venue: Shelly's Manne-Hole, Hollywood and The Village Gate New York City
- Genre: Jazz
- Length: 32:32
- Label: Atlantic; SD 1529
- Producer: Joel Dorn

Eddie Harris chronology
Silver Cycles (1968)	High Voltage (1969)	Swiss Movement (1969)

High Voltage is a live album by American jazz saxophonist Eddie Harris recorded in 1968 and 1969 and released on the Atlantic label.

== Reception ==
The Allmusic review calls it "Fascinating music, and a jazz radio staple in its time".

Professional ratings
Review scores
Source	Rating
Allmusic	4/5 stars

== Track listing ==
All compositions by Eddie Harris except as indicated

1. "Movin' On Out" - 6:12
2. "Funky Doo" (Harris, Melvin Jackson) - 8:11
3. "The Children's Song" - 3:27
4. "Ballad (For My Love)" - 4:58
5. "Is There a Place for Us" - 5:57
6. "Listen Here" - 3:47
- Recorded at Shelly's Manne-Hole in Hollywood, California on October 28, 1968 (tracks 3 & 5), and at The Village Gate, Greenwich Village, New York City on April 19, 1969

== Personnel ==
- Eddie Harris - tenor saxophone, varitone
- Jodie Christian - piano
- Melvin Jackson - bass
- Richard Smith (tracks 3 & 5), Billy Hart (tracks 1, 2, 4 & 6) - drums
