= Buck Clarke =

American jazz percussionist (1933–1988)

Background information
- Born: William Lewis Clarke; October 2, 1933; Washington, D.C., U.S.
- Died: October 11, 1988 (aged 55) Los Angeles, California, U.S.
- Genres: Contemporary jazz; cool jazz; soul jazz
- Occupations: Percussionist; composer
- Instruments: Bongos; congas
- Years active: 1960–1988
- Labels: Argo; Offbeat; Full Circle
- Formerly of: Les McCann; Herbie Hancock; Freddie Hubbard; Russ Freeman; Jimmy Smith

William Lewis "Buck" Clarke (October 2, 1933 – October 11, 1988) was an American jazz percussionist. His many musical styles included soul, funk and contemporary jazz, with an Afrocentric perspective.

== Early life ==
Clarke was born in Washington, D.C., on October 2, 1933. At 15, he started working at a display sign store. The father of one of his bosses was a cousin to Duke Ellington, so Clarke began to listen to jazz records by musicians such as Duke Ellington, Oscar Peterson, Allen Jones and Dizzy Gillespie during lunch breaks and weekends, and he became "hooked on jazz." He eventually had a job offer at a D.C. club where he learned to play the congas.

== Career ==
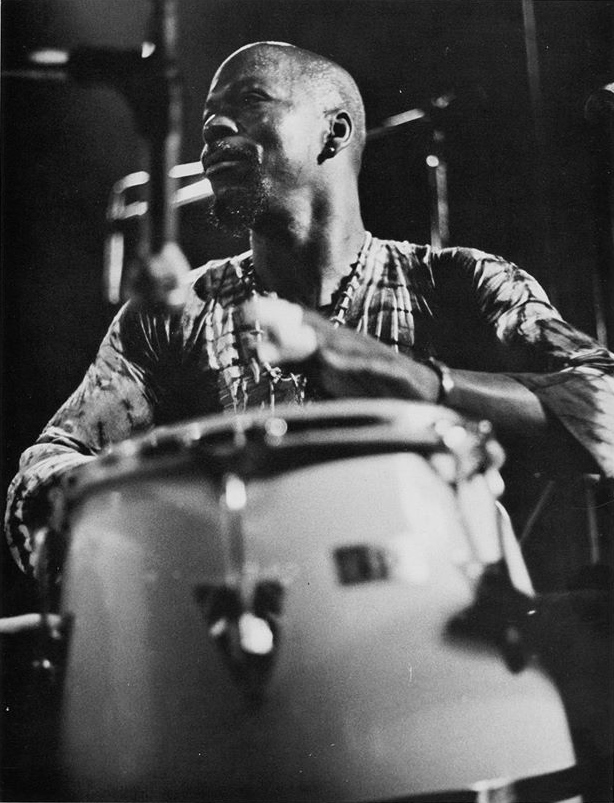
Clarke drumming in the 1980s

One of his very first gigs was at a show called "Jig Show", which featured dancers and comedians. Clarke would travel throughout the world, going to places such as New Orleans, where he first discovered rumba music. Many others tried to encourage young Clarke to play "real instruments", but his position was the bongo drums.

When he was 16 or 17 years old, he played with Charlie Parker. Clarke expressed his feelings about performing with Wess Anderson's band The Washingtonians which included Eddie Jones and Charlie Parker, saying it had him "shook up" and describing it as "mind blowing". He played with Art Blakey's The Jazz Messengers at the age of 19 or 20. He was a member of an eight-piece band which furthered his musical education. He also played at the Montreux Jazz Festival in 1968.Clarke played with Freddie Hubbard, Herbie Hancock, Les McCann, Russ Freeman, Gerald Albright, Jimmy Smith and others.

Clarke was an accomplished freelance painter. Some of his early artwork is displayed here on his Facebook page.

Clarke suffered from diabetes that cost him his leg in 1986. He died on October 11, 1988, in Los Angeles.

== Discography ==
=== As leader ===
Year recorded	Title	Label	Notes
1960	Cool Hands	Offbeat	Charles Hampton on (clarinet), (alto saxophone), (wood flute), (piano), Don McKenzie on (vibes), Fred Williams on (bass), Roscoe Hunter on (drums)
1961	Drum Sum	Argo	Charles Hampton on (clarinet), (alto saxophone), (wood flute), (piano), Don McKenzie on (vibes), Fred Williams on (bass), Roscoe Hunter on (drums)
1963	The Buck Clarke Sound	Argo	Dwayne Austin on (bass), Billy Hart on (drums), Charles Hampton on (flute), (alto saxophone), (piano), Jimmy Crawford on (piano) (tracks: 2, 3, 5), Lennie Cujé on (vibraphone), (marimba)
1988	Hot Stuff	Full Circle	Will McGregor on (bass), Ralph Penland on (drums), Russ Freeman on (Guitar), Chris Ho on (keyboards), Gerald Albright on (Reeds), Buck Clarke (percussion)

=== As sideman ===
With Les McCann

- Second Movement (Atlantic, 1971) – with Eddie Harris
- Invitation to Openness (Atlantic, 1972)
- Talk to the People (Atlantic, 1972)
- Live at Montreux (Atlantic, 1972)
- Layers (Atlantic, 1972)
- Another Beginning (Atlantic, 1974)

With Willis Jackson

- Blue Gator (Prestige, 1960)
- Cookin' Sherry (Prestige, 1961)
- Together Again! (Prestige, 1965) – "This'll Get To Ya'" & "It Might As Well Be Spring"
- Together Again, Again (Prestige, 1967)

With Eugene McDaniels

- Outlaw (Prestige, 1960)

With Dave Hubbard

- Dave Hubbard (Mainstream, 1971)

With Cannonball Adderley

- Black Messiah (Capitol, 1971)

With The Isley Brothers

- Givin' It Back – "Love The One You're With" (T-Neck, 1971)

With Nina Simone

- The Great Show Live in Paris (Disques Festival, 1975)

With Jimmy Smith

- Root Down – Jimmy Smith Live! (Verve, 1972)
- Paid In Full (Mojo, 1974)
- Jimmy Smith '75 (Mojo, 1975)
- It's Necessary (Mercury, 1977)

With John Mayall

- A Banquet In Blues (ABC, 1976)

With Herbie Hancock

- Sextant (Columbia, 1973)

With Freddie Hubbard

- Liquid Love (Columbia, 1975)
- Gleam (CBS/Sony, 1975)
- Splash (Fantasy, 1981)
- Born to Be Blue (Pablo, 1982)

With Ron Escheté

- Stump Jumper (Bainbridge, 1986)

With Thelonious Monster

- Stormy Weather (Relativity, 1989)

== See also ==
- Les McCann
- Freddie Hubbard
