= It's About Time (Teddy Edwards album) =

Studio album by Teddy Edwards with Les McCann Ltd.
- Released: 1960
- Recorded: August 1959
- Studio: Pacific Jazz Studios, Los Angeles, CA
- Genre: Jazz
- Length: 38:10
- Label: Pacific Jazz; PJ 6
- Producer: Richard Bock

Teddy Edwards chronology
Teddy Edwards at Falcon's Lair (1958)	It's About Time (1960)	Sunset Eyes (1960)

Les McCann chronology
It's About Time (1959)	Les McCann Ltd. Plays the Truth (1960)

It's About Time is an album by saxophonist Teddy Edwards with Les McCann's trio recorded in 1959 and released on the Pacific Jazz label.

== Reception ==
Professional ratings
Review scores
Source	Rating
Allmusic	3/5 stars

Allmusic awarded the album three stars.

== Track listing ==
1. "Our Love is Here to Stay" (George Gershwin, Ira Gershwin) - 5:35
2. "Frankly Speaking" (Teddy Edwards) - 5:52
3. "Fools Rush In" (Rube Bloom, Johnny Mercer) - 4:57
4. "Undecided" (Sid Robin, Charlie Shavers) - 4:38
5. "Beve's Comjumulations" (Les McCann) - 7:08
6. "Willow Weep for Me" (Ann Ronell) - 5:24
7. "Lover, Come Back to Me" (Sigmund Romberg, Oscar Hammerstein II) - 5:19

== Personnel ==
- Teddy Edwards - tenor saxophone
- Les McCann - piano
- Leroy Vinnegar - bass
- Ron Jefferson - drums
