= Les McCann Ltd. Plays the Truth =

Studio album by Les McCann Ltd.
- Released: 1960
- Recorded: February 4, 1960; United Recording, Hollywood, CA
- Genre: Jazz
- Length: 39:20
- Label: Pacific Jazz; PJ 2
- Producer: Richard Bock

Les McCann chronology
It's About Time (1959)	Les McCann Ltd. Plays the Truth (1960)	Les McCann Ltd. Plays the Shout (1960)

Les McCann Ltd. Plays the Truth (also referred to as just The Truth) is the debut album by pianist Les McCann recorded in 1960 and released on the Pacific Jazz label. Liner notes were by Frank Evans and album photography was by Ivan Nagy.

== Reception ==
Professional ratings
Review scores
Source	Rating
Allmusic	4/5 stars

Allmusic gives the album 4 stars.

== Track listing ==
All compositions by Les McCann except as indicated

1. "Vacushna" - 3:09
2. "A Little ¾ for God & Co." - 4:28
3. "I'll Remember April" (Gene de Paul, Patricia Johnston, Don Raye) - 7:47
4. "Fish This Week" - 3:06
5. "How High the Moon" (Morgan Lewis, Nancy Hamilton) - 6:04
6. "This Can't Be Love" (Richard Rodgers, Lorenz Hart) - 3:17
7. "For Carl Perkins" (Leroy Vinnegar) - 5:40
8. "The Truth" - 5:49

== Personnel ==
- Les McCann - piano
- Leroy Vinnegar - bass
- Ron Jefferson - drums
