= Ron Jefferson =

American jazz drummer (1926–2007)

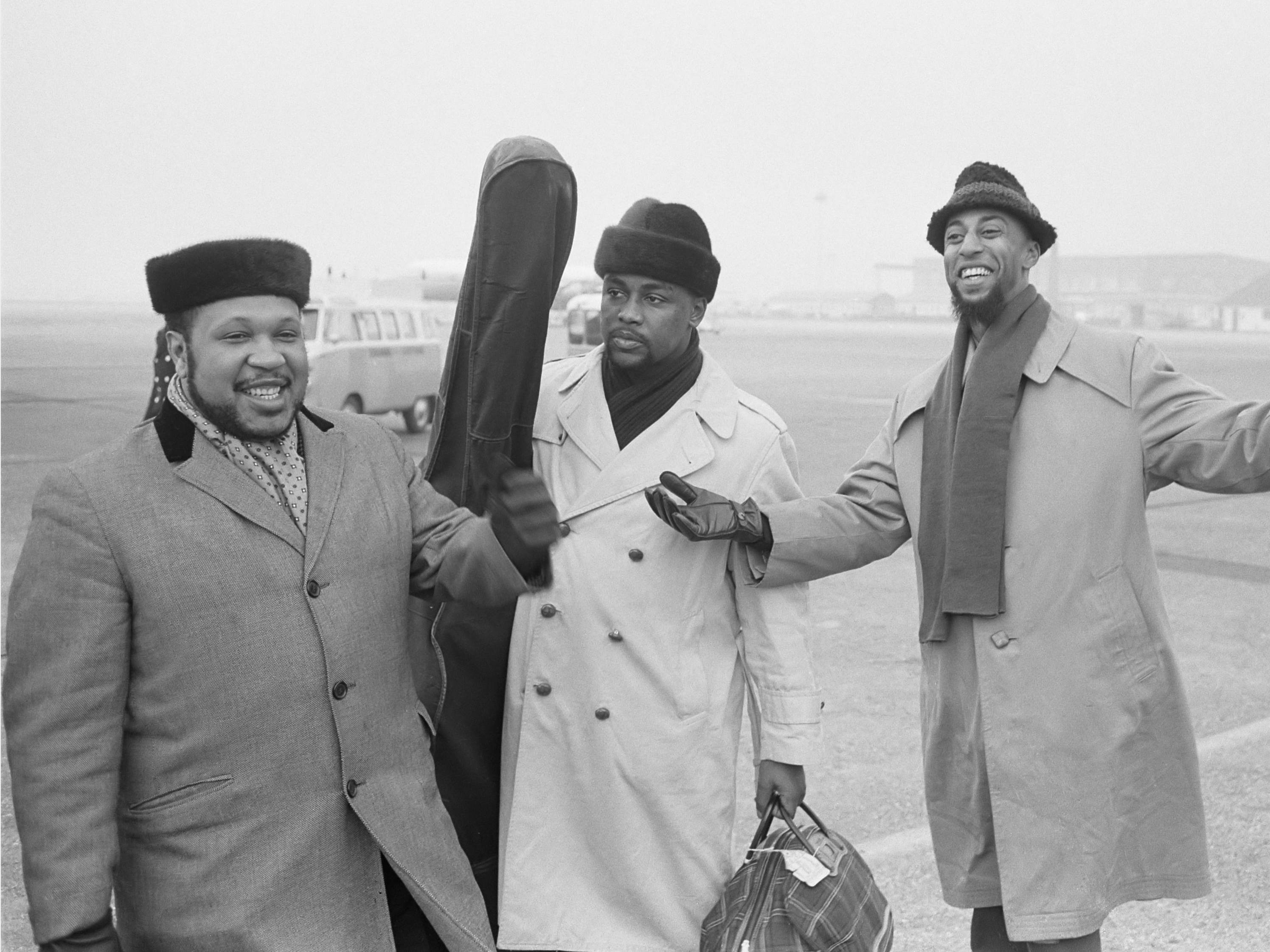
Les McCann Trio, Ron Jefferson on the right (1962)

Ron Jefferson (February 13, 1926, in New York City – May 7, 2007, in Richmond, Virginia) was a jazz drummer. Considered a disciple of Max Roach, in the 1950s, he worked with Coleman Hawkins, Roy Eldridge, Oscar Pettiford, and Lester Young, among others.

Jefferson was a founding member of Les McCann's trio, with whom he played from 1960 to 1964. He also recorded with "Groove" Holmes, as well as with Joe Pass for Pacific Jazz Records in 1963 and 1964. After leaving the West Coast, he went to live in Paris, and from there to Barcelona, backing Ruth Brown as part of a trio with pianist Stuart de Silva. He led his own line-ups including Bobby Hutcherson and others.

He was an uncle of drummer Al Foster.

In the 1980s, Jefferson co-hosted the John Lewis Show, a public-access television show in New York City hosted by fellow musician John Lewis.

Jefferson died in Richmond at the age of 81 after being hospitalized with an illness.

== Discography ==
As leader/co-leader

- 1962: Love Lifted Me (Pacific Jazz, 1962)
- 1976: Vous Ete's Swing (Catalyst)

As sideman

With Teddy Edwards

- It's About Time (Pacific Jazz, 1959) with Les McCann

With Richard "Groove" Holmes

- "Groove" (Pacific Jazz, 1961) with Les McCann and Ben Webster
- Tell It Like It Tis (Pacific Jazz, 1961–62 [1966])
- Somethin' Special (Pacific Jazz, 1962) with Les McCann

With Les McCann

- Les McCann Ltd. Plays the Truth (Pacific Jazz, 1960)
- Les McCann Ltd. in San Francisco (Pacific Jazz, 1960 [1961])
- From the Top of the Barrel (Pacific Jazz, 1960 [1967])
- Pretty Lady (Pacific Jazz, 1961)
- Les McCann Sings (Pacific Jazz, 1961)
- Les McCann Ltd. in New York (Pacific Jazz, 1961 [1962])
- Les McCann Ltd. Plays the Shampoo (Pacific Jazz, 1961 [1963])
- New from the Big City (Pacific Jazz, 1961 [1970])
- On Time (Pacific Jazz, 1962)
- A Bag of Gold (Pacific Jazz, 1960–64 [1966])

With Oscar Pettiford

- Oscar Pettiford (Bethlehem, 1954)

With Joe Pass

- The Complete Pacific Jazz Joe Pass Quartet Sessions (Mosaic, 2001) (recorded 1963/1964)

With Lou Rawls

- Stormy Monday (Capitol, 1962)

With Joe Roland

- Joltin' Joe Roland (Savoy, 1955)

With Leroy Vinnegar

- Leroy Walks Again!! (Contemporary, 1963)

With Julius Watkins and Charlie Rouse

- Les Jazz Modes (Dawn, 1957)
- Mood in Scarlet (Dawn, 1957)
- The Most Happy Fella (Atlantic, 1958)
- The Jazz Modes (Atlantic, 1959)
