= Remote recording =

Recording of high-quality, complex audio outside of a studio

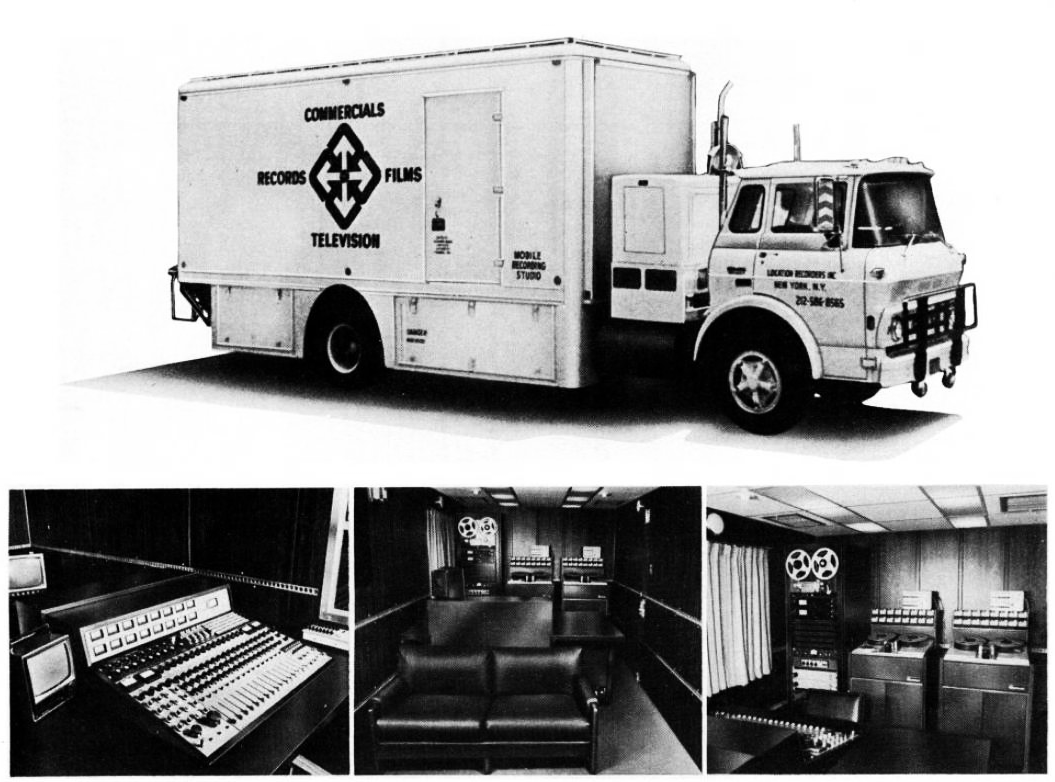
A remote truck and its interiors, 1970

Remote recording, also known as location recording, is the act of making a high-quality complex audio recording of a live concert performance, or any other location recording that uses multitrack recording techniques outside of a recording studio. The multitrack recording is then carefully mixed, and the finished result is called a remote recording or a live album. This is in contrast to a field recording which uses few microphones, recorded onto the same number of channels as the intended product. Remote recording is not the same as remote broadcast for which multiple microphones are mixed live and broadcast during the performance, typically to stereo. Remote recording and remote broadcast may be carried out simultaneously by the same crew using the same microphones.

One important benefit of a remote recording is that the performers will respond to the audience; they will not be as distracted by the recording process. Another reason for a remote recording is to capture an artist in a different acoustic space such as a church, ballroom or meeting hall.

To make a remote recording, studio-quality recording equipment is trucked to the concert venue and connected to the concert microphones with a bank of microphone splitters. Other microphones may be added. The individual microphone signals are routed to separate tracks.

A remote recording is often made using a specially built remote truck: a rolling recording studio control room carrying a mixing console, studio monitors and multitrack recorders. Beginning modestly in 1958, recording engineer Wally Heider developed and popularized the use of a remote truck in California in the mid-1960s and throughout the 1970s.

== History ==
Remote recording developed out of the practice of making field recordings with high-quality equipment. The earliest such recordings were crude, undertaken in the 1920s and 1930s, beginning with Ralph Peer in 1923. Peer carried a disc-cutting machine and recorded musicians directly to disc. From 1941 Alan Lomax became known for the field recordings he made of the various musical traditions carried to or created in the United States. In the 1950s, advances in microphones, mixers and tape recorders allowed more sophisticated equipment to be carried to a concert location, including more microphones, tape recorders with more tracks, and possibly a mixing console to mix multiple microphones down to fewer recorded tracks.

Not all remote recordings were well received by the public. For instance, in 1963 Chess Records hauled their monaural tape recorder to Myrtle Beach, South Carolina, to capture the Fourth of July weekend concerts including Bo Diddley's electrifying performance in front of 2,000 excited fans. The resulting album, Bo Diddley's Beach Party, did not sell well in the U.S.

In 1958, American recording engineer Wally Heider mounted recording equipment in a truck, reportedly the first to do so. The next year, engineer Reice Hamel did the same. Both men used new techniques, bringing many microphones to a concert and mixing the performance as it happened—in the manner of a remote broadcast—recording onto stereo tape recorders for release as stereo and mono records. Hamel's first truck grew from simple to more complex in the first seven years. He started with stereo, obtained a three-track machine on which he taped a Barbra Streisand concert, then in 1965 he configured the truck as a complete recording studio. In 1966 he installed a four-track machine, then moved to eight-track, and by 1971 was recording on sixteen tracks.

Many of Heider's recordings became hits or critical successes. One of them is the classic album Live in Concert by Ray Charles, captured in 1964 at the Shrine Auditorium in Los Angeles. Heider recorded the Monterey Pop Festival in 1967; its many musical acts and the increasing importance of high quality sound for a concert film signaled a major shift in scale and importance for the remote truck operator. After that, other recording studios assembled their own remote recording trucks and more concerts were saved on multitrack tapes. The Woodstock Festival was recorded on 12-track by a remote truck and then mixed at the Record Plant studio in New York. In August 1971, the Record Plant used its first remote truck to make its first remote recording, The Concert for Bangladesh held at Madison Square Garden. In preparation for the concert, Record Plant co-founder Chris Stone said that remote recording had several key advantages to studio recording: "It is really not as expensive as studio time when one considers that the concert is two hours long, perhaps twice a night for two days. It is a spontaneous music that is recorded live. This makes it more flavorable [sic]. And it is usually easier on the musician, who gets paid for the concert and gets the recording done for his next LP at the same time. Everyone wins."

== See also ==
- Outside broadcasting
- Rolling Stones Mobile Studio
