= Leroy Walks! =

Studio album by Leroy Vinnegar
- Released: 1958
- Recorded: July 15 and September 6 & 23, 1957; Los Angeles, CA
- Genre: Jazz
- Length: 41:06
- Label: Contemporary C3542/S7542
- Producer: Lester Koenig

Leroy Vinnegar chronology
Leroy Walks! (1958)	Leroy Walks Again!! (1963)

Leroy Walks! is the debut album by American jazz bassist Leroy Vinnegar, recorded in 1957 and released on the Contemporary label. On June 16, 2023, a version newly remastered by Bernie Grundman was reissued by Craft Recordings.

== Reception ==
The AllMusic review by Scott Yanow described it as "A fine, straight-ahead session".

Professional ratings
Review scores
Source	Rating
AllMusic	4/5 stars
The Rolling Stone Jazz Record Guide	3/5 stars
The Penguin Guide to Jazz Recordings	3.5/4 stars

== Track listing ==
1. "Walk On" (Leroy Vinnegar) – 8:23
2. "Would You Like to Take a Walk?" (Mort Dixon, Billy Rose, Harry Warren) – 6:52
3. "On the Sunny Side of the Street" (Dorothy Fields, Jimmy McHugh) – 5:37
4. "Walkin'" (Richard Carpenter) – 6:24
5. "Walkin' My Baby Back Home" (Fred E. Ahlert, Roy Turk) – 4:47
6. "I'll Walk Alone" (Sammy Cahn, Jule Styne) – 3:30
7. "Walking by the River" (Una Mae Carlisle, Robert Sour) – 5:33
- Recorded in Los Angeles, CA on July 15 (tracks 1 & 4), September 16 (tracks 3, 5 & 6), and September 23 (tracks 2 & 7), 1957

== Personnel ==
- Leroy Vinnegar – bass
- Gerald Wilson – trumpet
- Teddy Edwards – tenor saxophone
- Victor Feldman – vibraphone
- Carl Perkins – piano
- Tony Bazley – drums
