= Cool Hands =

Studio album by Buck Clarke
- Released: 1960
- Recorded: December 2–3, 1959
- Genre: Jazz
- Length: 45:14
- Label: Washington; OJ-3003
- Producer: Buck Clarke

Buck Clarke chronology
Cool Hands (1960)	Drum Sum (1961)

Cool Hands is an album by jazz percussionist Buck Clarke. It was recorded in Washington, D.C., on December 2–3, 1959, and released by Washington Records. It features Charles Hampton, Don McKenzie, Fred Williams and Roscoe Hunter.

== Reception ==
Professional ratings
Review scores
Source	Rating
AllMusic	3/5 stars

AllMusic rated the album 3 stars.

== Track listing ==
1. "Cool Hands" (Charles Hampton) – 3:47
2. "What Is This Thing Called Love?" (Cole Porter) – 5:28
3. "Second Wind" (Fred Williams) – 4:16
4. "Mil-dy" (Charles Hampton) – 3:16
5. "Ed's Blues" (Charles Hampton) – 5:36
6. "X-a-dose" (Clark, McKenzie, Hampton, Williams, Hunter) – 6:08
7. "Lover Man" (Roger Ramirez, James Sherman, Jimmy Davis) – 4:37
8. "I'll Remember April" (Don Raye, Gene de Paul, Patricia Johnston) – 5:03
9. "Floretta" (Don MacKenzie) – 7:03

== Personnel ==
- Buck Clarke – congas, bongos
- Charles Hampton – clarinet, alto saxophone, wood flute, piano
- Don McKenzie – vibes
- Fred Williams – bass
- Roscoe Hunter – drums
