= Another Beginning =

Studio album by Les McCann
- Released: 1974
- Recorded: May 20–24, 1974; The Village Recorder, West Los Angeles, CA
- Genre: Jazz
- Length: 42:30
- Label: Atlantic; SD 1666
- Producer: Joel Dorn, Les McCann and Jack Shaw

Les McCann chronology
Layers (1973)	Another Beginning (1974)	Hustle to Survive (1975)

Another Beginning is an album by pianist Les McCann recorded in 1974 and released on the Atlantic label.

== Reception ==
Professional ratings
Review scores
Source	Rating
Allmusic	2/5 stars

Allmusic gives the album 2 stars.

== Track listing ==
All compositions by Les McCann except as indicated

1. "Maybe You'll Come Back" – 3:58
2. "The Song of Love" – 3:14
3. "When It's Over" (J. Mayer, B. Barnes, J. Lynn) – 10:28
4. "Somebody's Been Lying 'bout Me" – 3:32
5. "Go On and Cry" – 5:23
6. "My Soul Lies Deep" (Les McCann, Reverend B.) – 5:19
7. "The Morning Song" – 3:38
8. "Someday We'll Meet Again" – 6:58

== Personnel ==
- Les McCann – piano, electric piano, synthesizer, clavinet, vocals, arranger
- Jon Faddis, Danny Moore, Joe Wilder – trumpet, flugelhorn
- Garnett Brown, Kiane Zawadi – trombone
- Bill Slapin – clarinet, saxophone
- Seldon Powell, Harold Vick, Frank Wess – saxophone
- Roy Gaines (tracks 1 & 2), Miroslaw Kudykowski (tracks 3–7) – guitar
- Chuck Rainey (tracks 1 & 2), Jimmy Rowser (tracks 3–7) – electric bass
- Harold Davis (tracks 3–7), Paul Humphrey (tracks 1 & 2) – drums
- Buck Clarke – percussion
- William Eaton – arranger
- Sally Stevens, Marti McCall, Bob Esty, Jimmy Gilstrap, Carmen Bryant, Vennette Gloud, Sandy Merrill Smolen, Kathy Collier, Morgan Ames, Cissy Houston, Deidre Tuck, Rennelle Stafford, Norma Holmes, Tamiko Loving, Laurence Moore – background vocals
- David Nadien, Emanuel Green, Paul Gershman, Selwart Clarke, Joe Malin, Matthew Raimondi, Sanford Allen, Harry Lookofsky, Max Ellen, Harry Cykman – violin
- Al Brown, Julien Barber – violas
- Kermit Moore, George Ricci – cello
- Herb Bushler – bass

== Uses in other media ==
"Go On And Cry" was sampled in the track "Flawless" from the Living Legends album, "Almost Famous". It was also sampled in "Runnin Wit No Breaks" by Warren G.
