= The Gospel Truth =

Studio album by Les McCann Ltd.
- Released: 1963
- Recorded: 1963; Pacific Jazz Studios, Hollywood, CA
- Genre: Jazz
- Length: 36:36
- Label: Pacific Jazz; PJ 69
- Producer: Richard Bock

Les McCann chronology
On Time (1962)	The Gospel Truth (1963)	Soul Hits (1963)

The Gospel Truth is an album by pianist Les McCann recorded in 1963 and released on the Pacific Jazz label.

== Reception ==
Professional ratings
Review scores
Source	Rating
Allmusic	3/5 stars

Allmusic gives the album 3 stars.

== Track listing ==
All compositions by Les McCann except as indicated

1. "The Gospel Truth" - 1:55
2. "Isn't It Wonderful" - 4:10
3. "Oh the Joy" - 3:10
4. "Let Us Break Bread Together" (Traditional) - 5:08
5. "Didn't It Rain" (Traditional) - 4:05
6. "Send It Down to Me" - 4:08
7. "Get That Soul" - 2:34
8. "The Preacher" (Horace Silver) - 4:30
9. "Were You There" (Traditional) - 4:53
10. "Bye and Bye" (Traditional) - 2:03

== Personnel ==
- Les McCann - piano
- Charles Kynard - organ (tracks 1, 6 & 9)
- Stanley Gilbert - bass
- Paul Humphrey - drums
