= Invitation to Openness =

Studio album by Les McCann
- Released: 1972
- Recorded: May 4, 1971
- Studio: Atlantic Studios, NYC
- Genre: Jazz fusion
- Length: 51:57
- Label: Atlantic; SD 1603
- Producer: Joel Dorn

Les McCann chronology
Second Movement (1970)	Invitation to Openness (1972)	Talk to the People (1972)

Invitation to Openness is an album by pianist Les McCann recorded in 1971 and released on the Atlantic label.

== Reception ==
Professional ratings
Review scores
Source	Rating
Allmusic	4/5 stars

Allmusic gives the album 4 stars stating "Every nuance of McCann's stream of consciousness comes through loud and clear" calling it "an auditory delight for fusion fans".

== Track listing ==
All compositions by Les McCann

1. "The Lovers" - 26:02
2. "Beaux J. Poo Boo" - 13:06
3. "Poo Pye McGoochie (and His Friends)" - 12:30

== Personnel ==
- Les McCann - piano, electric piano, Moog synthesizer, arranger, conductor
- Yusef Lateef - tenor saxophone, oboe, flute, pneumatic flute, plum blossom, temple bells
- David Spinozza - guitar, electric guitar
- Cornell Dupree - electric guitar
- Corky Hale - harp
- Jodie Christian - electric piano
- Bill Salter - electric bass
- Jimmy Rowser - bass
- Donald Dean, Alphonse Mouzon, Bernard Purdie - drums, percussion
- William "Buck" Clarke - African drums, percussion
- Ralph McDonald - percussion
- Jimmy Douglass-Recording Engineer
- Fred Catero-Re-mix Engineer
- Gene Paul-Mastering Engineer
