= Drum Sum =

Studio album by Buck Clarke Quintet
- Released: 1961
- Recorded: November 8, 1960
- Studio: Bell Sound (New York City)
- Genre: Jazz
- Label: Argo; LP 4007
- Producer: Buck Clarke

Buck Clarke chronology
Cool Hands (1960)	Drum Sum (1961)	The Buck Clarke Sound (1963)

Drum Sum is the second album by American jazz percussionist Buck Clarke. The album was released in 1961. Recorded November 8, 1960 at Bell Sound Studios, New York on Argo Records. The album features Fred Williams, Don McKenzie, Clement Wells, Charles Hampton and Roscoe Hunter.

== Track listing ==
1. "Woody 'n' You" (Dizzy Gillespie) – 4:27
2. "Don't Get Around Much Anymore" (Duke Ellington, Bob Russell) – 2:45
3. "Funk Roots" (Fred Williams) – 2:45
4. "Darben, The Redd Foxx" (Charles Hampton) – 3:07
5. "Bags' Groove" (Milt Jackson) – 4:10
6. "Blues For Us" (Clark, McKenzie, Hampton, Williams, Hunter) – 4:50
7. "Georgia" (Hoagy Carmichael, Stuart Gorrell) – 2:40
8. "Drum Sum" (Fred Williams) – 3:05
9. "Buckskins" (Charles Hampton) – 3:42
10. "I Got Rhythm" (George Gershwin, Ira Gershwin) - 3:02

== Personnel ==
- Charles Hampton – clarinet, alto saxophone, wood flute, piano
- Clement Wells – vibes
- Fred Williams – bass
- Roscoe Hunter – drums
- Buck Clarke – congas, bongos

Production notes:

- Ralph Bass - recording supervisor
- Don Bronstein - design
- Leonard Feather - liner notes
