= Just to See Her =

Single by Smokey Robinson

from the album One Heartbeat
- B-side: "I'm Gonna Love You Like There's No Tomorrow"
- Released: March 4, 1987
- Recorded: 1986
- Genre: R&B, pop, soul
- Length: 4:02
- Label: Motown
- Songwriters: Jimmy George, Lou Pardini
- Producers: Peter Bunetta, Rick Chudacoff

Smokey Robinson singles chronology
"Love Will Set You Free (Theme from Solarbabies)" (1986)	"Just to See Her" (1987)	"One Heartbeat" (1987)

"Just to See Her" is a 1987 song written by Jimmy George and Lou Pardini and recorded by American R&B recording artist Smokey Robinson from his studio album One Heartbeat (1987).

"Just to See Her" peaked at No. 7 in Cash Box and No. 8 on the Billboard Hot 100 in July 1987. It also reached No. 2 on the R&B chart and hit No. 1 on the Adult Contemporary chart. In the United Kingdom, the song peaked at No. 52 on the Singles Chart.

Robinson won his first career Grammy Award for Best Male R&B Vocal Performance at the 30th Grammy Awards in 1988. Song writers Lou Pardini and Jimmy George were nominated for a Grammy Award in the Best R&B Song category the same year.

== Charts ==
Year-end chart (1987)	Position
US Top Pop Singles (Billboard)	87

== Other recordings ==
- Lou Pardini released his version in 1996.
- Andy Williams released a version in 2007 on his album, I Don't Remember Ever Growing Up.
- Filipino singer Jay R covered the song on his 2008 album Soul in Love.
- American jazz & R&B singer Phil Perry covered the song on his 2013 album Mighty to Love.
