= Donald Dean =

American jazz musician

Donald Dean (born June 21, 1937) is a jazz drummer who has worked with Kenny Dorham, Les McCann and others. A collection related to him is led by the Los Angeles Jazz Institute.

He appears, alongside Les McCann and Eddie Harris, on the soul jazz album Swiss Movement, recorded live on June 21, 1969, at The Montreux Jazz Festival.

His grandson Jamael Dean is a musician who has worked, and performed, with Kamasi Washington, Thundercat, Miguel Atwood-Ferguson and Carlos Niño. Jamael is signed to Stones Throw Records on which he released his debut record, Black Space Tapes, in November 2019.

== Discography ==
=== As sideman ===
With Les McCann

- Swiss Movement (Atlantic, 1969)
- Much Les (Atlantic, 1969)
- Comment (Atlantic, 1970)
- Second Movement (Atlantic, 1971)
- Invitation to Openness (Atlantic, 1972)
- Talk to the People (Atlantic, 1972)
- Live at Montreux (Atlantic, 1973)
- Layers (Atlantic, 1973)
- Les Is More (Night, 1991)

With Jimmy Smith

- Bluesmith (Verve, 1972)
- Paid in Full (Mojo, 1974)
- 75 (Mojo, 1975)

With others

- Earl Anderza, Outa Sight (Pacific Jazz, 1962)
- Carmell Jones, Business Meeting (Pacific Jazz, 1962)
- Horace Tapscott, Live (Americana, 1988)
- Horace Tapscott, Why Don't You Listen? (Dark Tree, 2019)

== Sources ==
- Richard Cook & Brian Morton: The Penguin Guide to Jazz Recordings, 8th Edition, London, Penguin, 2006 ISBN 0-14-102327-9
- Leonard Feather & Ira Gitler, The Biographical Encyclopedia of Jazz. Oxford/New York, 1999, ISBN 978-0-19-532000-8
