= Root Down (album) =

Live album by Jimmy Smith
- Released: 1972
- Recorded: February 8, 1972
- Venue: The Bombay Bicycle Club, Los Angeles
- Genre: Jazz-funk
- Length: 41:47; 67:08 (remastered version)
- Label: Verve V-8806

Jimmy Smith chronology
| In a Plain Brown Wrapper (1972) | Root Down (1972) | Bluesmith (1972) |

Root Down is a 1972 live jazz album by Jimmy Smith, released on the Verve label. It was recorded in the Bombay Bicycle Club in Los Angeles on February 8, 1972. It includes the song "Root Down (And Get It)" which was sampled by the Beastie Boys for their song "Root Down."

Root Down peaked at number 24 on the Billboard Top Jazz Album charts.

== Reception ==
Professional ratings
Review scores
| Source | Rating |
|---|---|
| AllMusic | 5/5 stars |
| The Penguin Guide to Jazz | 3.5/4 stars |

AllMusic reviewer Stephen Thomas Erlewine wrote: "...the album captures a performance Smith gave with a relatively young supporting band who were clearly influenced by modern funk and rock. They push Smith to playing low-down grooves that truly cook: 'Sagg Shootin' His Arrow' and 'Root Down (And Get It)' are among the hottest tracks he ever cut...There are times where the pace slows, but the tension never sags, and the result is one of the finest, most exciting records in Smith's catalog. If you think you know everything about Jimmy Smith, this is the album for you."

== Track listing ==
1. "Sagg Shootin' His Arrow" (Jimmy Smith) – 7:09
2. "For Everyone Under the Sun" (Peter Chase) – 5:56
3. "After Hours" (Avery Parrish, Buddy Feyne, Robert Bruce) – 7:45
4. "Root Down (And Get It)" (Smith) – 7:44
5. "Let's Stay Together" (Al Green, Al Jackson Jr., Willie Mitchell) – 6:30
6. "Slow Down Sagg" (Smith) – 6:43

2000 remastered edition (Verve By Request series)

1. "Introduction" (Hidden Track) – 2:07
2. "Sagg Shootin' His Arrow" [Unedited version] – 11:45
3. "For Everyone Under the Sun" – 5:55
4. "After Hours" – 7:51
5. "Root Down (And Get It)" [Unedited version] – 12:39
6. "Let's Stay Together" – 6:27
7. "Slow Down Sagg" [Unedited version] – 10:22
8. "Root Down (And Get It)" [Previously unissued alternative version] – 12:13

== Personnel ==
Musicians

- Jimmy Smith - Hammond B3 organ
- Paul Humphrey - drums
- Wilton Felder - bass guitar
- Buck Clarke - congas, percussion
- Arthur Adams - guitar
- Steve Williams - harmonica

Reissue production

- Hollis King - art direction
- Sherniece Smith - art producer
- Carlos Kase - audio supervisor, producer, research coordination
- Ed Green - engineer
- Jack Hunt
- Mark Smith - producer, research assistant
- Tom Greenwood - producer, research coordination
- John Wriggle
- Eric Miller - producer, supervising editor, supervising engineer
- Bryan Koniarz - production coordination
- Ben Young - research
