= Bucket o' Grease =

Studio album by Les McCann Ltd.
- Released: 1967
- Recorded: December 27 & 28, 1966; Los Angeles, CA
- Genre: Jazz
- Length: 31:50
- Label: Limelight; LM 82043
- Producer: Jerry Ross

Les McCann chronology
Les McCann Plays the Hits (1966)	Bucket o' Grease (1967)	Live at Bohemian Caverns - Washington, DC (1967)

Bucket o' Grease is an album by pianist Les McCann's group Les McCann Ltd., recorded in late 1966 and released on the Limelight label.

== Reception ==
Professional ratings
Review scores
Source	Rating
Allmusic	3/5 stars

Allmusic gives the album 3 stars.

== Track listing ==
All compositions by Jerry Ross and Les McCann except as indicated

1. "Hey Leroy, Your Mama's Callin' You" (Jimmy Castor) - 1:48
2. "Bang! Bang!" (Joe Cuba, Jimmy Sabater) - 2:19
3. "Music to Watch Girls By" (Sid Ramin) - 3:07
4. "Watermelon Man" (Herbie Hancock) - 3:41
5. "La Brea" - 3:53
6. "All" (Marian Grudeff, Nino Oliviero, Raymond Jessel) - 2:43
7. "Red Top" (Gene Ammons, Ben Kynard, Lionel Hampton) - 3:01
8. "Yesterday" (John Lennon, Paul McCartney) - 3:09
9. "Boo-Go-Loo" (Jerry Murray) - 2:51
10. "Bucket O' Grease" - 2:45
11. "Fake Out" - 2:33

== Personnel ==
- Les McCann - piano, electric piano
- Lee Katzman - trumpet, flugelhorn
- Plas Johnson - tenor saxophone, flute
- Lynn Blessing - vibraphone
- Jimmy Georgantones - guitar
- Leroy Vinnegar - bass
- Booker T. Robinson - drums
- Ron Rich, Ric Desilva, Aki Aleong, Joseph Torres - percussion
