= Much Les =

Studio album by Les McCann
- Released: 1969
- Recorded: July 22–24 and November 20, 1968
- Studio: Atlantic Studios and RCA Studios, New York
- Genre: Jazz
- Length: 37:09
- Label: Atlantic; SD 1516
- Producer: Joel Dorn

Les McCann chronology
| Live at Bohemian Caverns - Washington, DC (1967) | Much Les (1969) | Swiss Movement (1969) |

Much Les is an album by jazz pianist Les McCann, recorded in 1968, and was his first released, in 1969, on the Atlantic label.

== Reception ==
Professional ratings
Review scores
| Source | Rating |
|---|---|
| Allmusic | 5/5 stars |

AllMusic gives the album 5 stars stating "One of Les McCann's greatest albums, Much Les encapsulates much of what McCann did best in his early years, while adding a few novel embellishments – like a string section and Latin percussionists – that enhance his core sound. The results are winning, likable, and consistently engaging, making for an underrated classic. ...the program is nicely varied, and the richer, more expanded arrangements serve to highlight – not obscure – the McCann trio's command of the groove. That's what makes Much Les such an enjoyable, essential listen".

"With These Hands" was issued as a single (b/w "Burnin' Coal"), as Atlantic 45-2615, in March 1969.

== Track listing ==
All compositions by Les McCann except as indicated

1. "Doin' That Thing" (Leroy Vinnegar) – 8:32
2. "With These Hands" (Abner Silver, Benny Davis) – 5:35
3. "Burnin' Coal" – 6:36
4. "Benjamin" – 5:45
5. "Love for Sale" (Cole Porter) – 6:34
6. "Roberta" – 8:51

== Personnel ==
- Les McCann – piano, vocals
- Leroy Vinnegar – bass
- Donald Dean – drums
- Willie Bobo – timbales (tracks 1, 3 & 5)
- Victor Pantoja – congas (tracks 1, 3 & 5)
- William Fischer – string arrangement, director (tracks 1, 2, 4 & 6)
- Selwart Clarke – viola, concertmaster (tracks 1, 2, 4 & 6)
- Winston Collymore, Noel DaCosta, Richard Elias, Emanuel Green, Theodore Israel, Warren Laffredo – violin (tracks 1, 2, 4 & 6)
- Ron Carter, Kermit Moore, Harvey Shapiro – cello (tracks 1, 2, 4 & 6)
