= Reice Hamel =

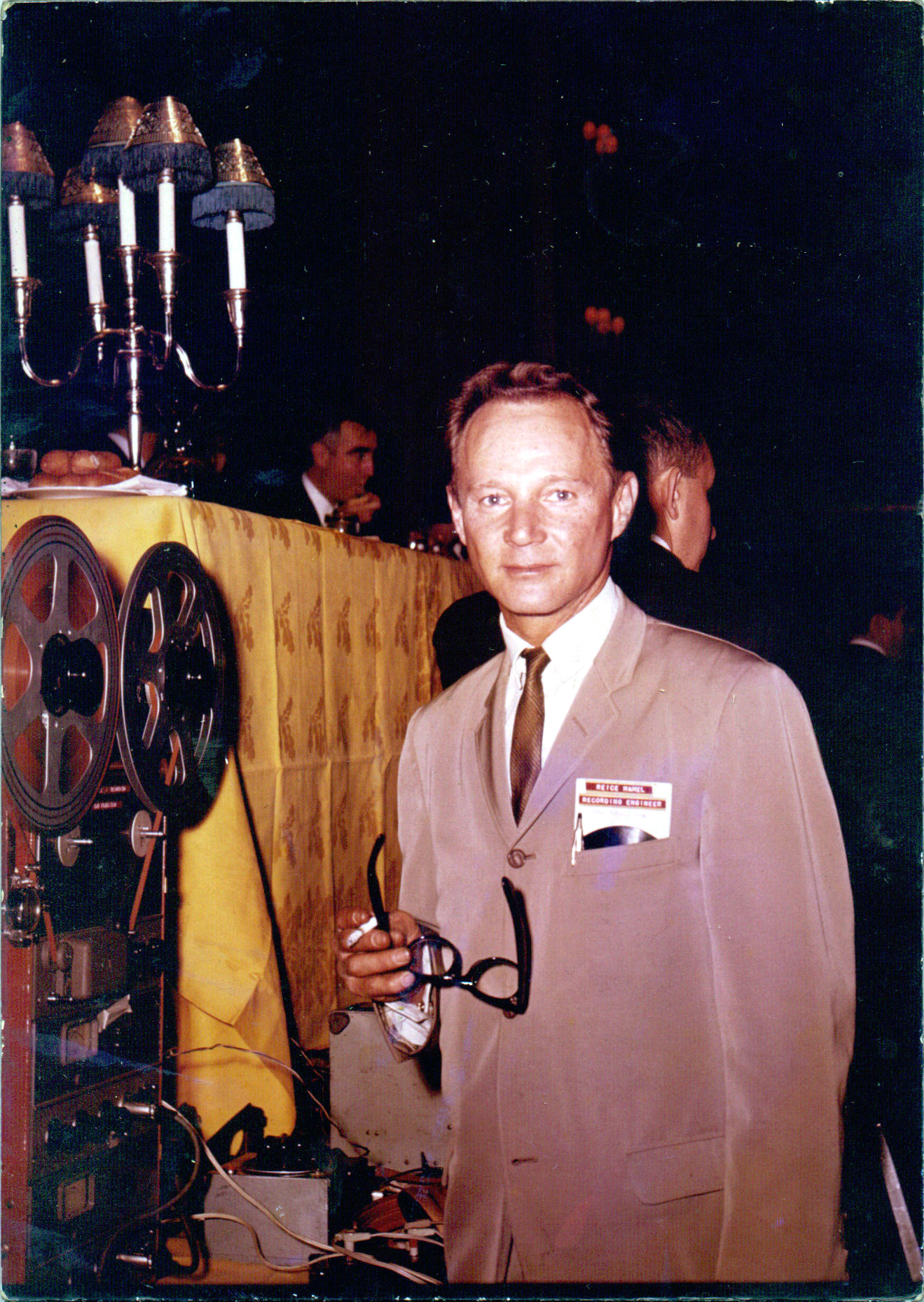
Reice Hamel (1960, San Francisco)

Reice Hamel (June 18, 1920 – October 1, 1986) was an American Audio Recording engineer. He is considered, along with his colleague Wally Heider, to be the pioneer of complex live remote recording. He recorded under the company name, Reice Hamel Recording USA.

== Early Years in New York ==
Reice Hamel was born on the Lower East Side of Manhattan, New York City on June 18, 1920. His mother Freida Bernstein, and Father Leo Hamel, were Jewish immigrants from Austria who came to America in the early 1900s. During World War II, he was a Navy Lieutenant, Chief Radio Officer. After the War, he worked for International Telephone and Telegraph as a field engineer and was also a freelance television technician in Manhattan, NYC.

In 1956, he became interested in audio engineering and magnetic tape recording and decided to try it as a business. He used a modified Ampex 601 tape deck to record his first performance, a Girl Scout round-up in the middle of the Idaho forest.

== Alone in San Francisco ==
Hamel moved west to San Francisco, a city filled with new ideas and talent. In the 1950s, San Francisco was a hotbed of talent and in small nightclubs like the Hungry I, Purple Onion, Jazz Workshop, Curran Theatre, the Cellar, and the Blackhawk. On any given evening there would be comedians, singers, and bands of all types. Reice Hamel began his career as a recording engineer to stars when he was granted the job of recording a well-known Jazz group, the Cannonball Adderley Quintet. The recording took place at the Jazz Workshop in San Francisco.

The record producer Orrin Keepnews of Riverside Records commissioned Reice Hamel on October 18, 1959 to record the two-day session. The recording and subsequent album that resulted became, according to Keepnews, "one of the most exciting, influential and successful live recordings in modern Jazz History ".

The success of the Cannonball recording propelled Reice Hamel into national attention and he was nominated for a Grammy Award for recording excellence. This was the first Grammy Awards and he was the first engineer to be nominated. After all the success, Reice Hamel went back to the workbench and improved his electronic circuits. Ampex Corporation, the manufacturer of his tape deck, used him as a field test engineer to improve the design of tape decks during that era. In 1963, at the Hungry I club, a young teenage singer made her debut, recorded by Reice Hamel, her name was Barbra Streisand. Many of the early recordings that he did in the San Francisco area were done out of his Porsche convertible and later in his custom VW bus mobile recording studio.

== Joan Baez Concerts 1962 ==
The legendary outdoor performances of Joan Baez were captured on tape by Reice Hamel using his custom-designed recording systems. These recordings are of exceptional sound quality and in 1962, Seymour Solomon, of Vanguard Records wrote a letter to thank Reice Hamel for the tapes.

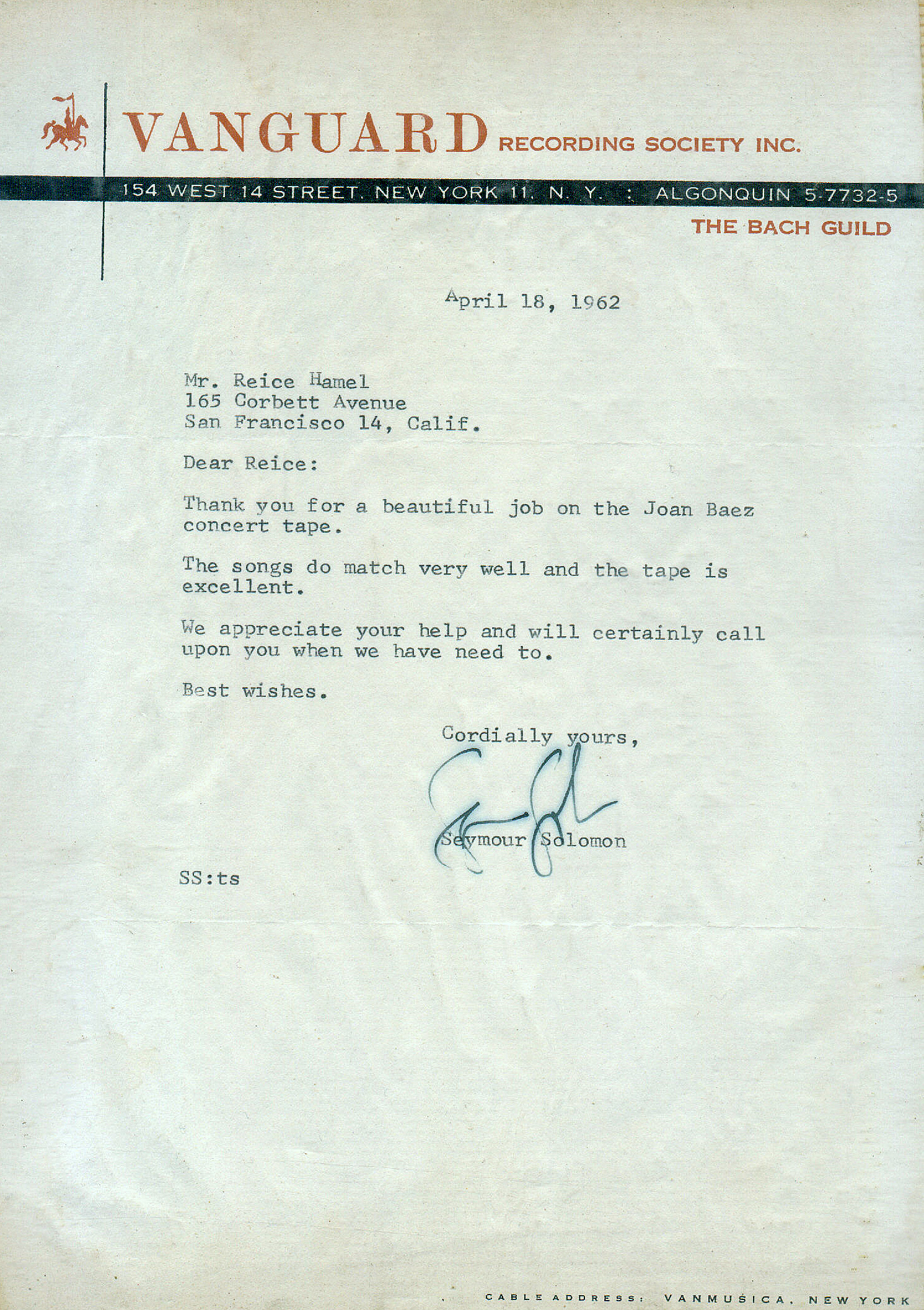
ReiceHamelRecording (16)
