= Wally Heider =

American recording engineer (1922–1989)

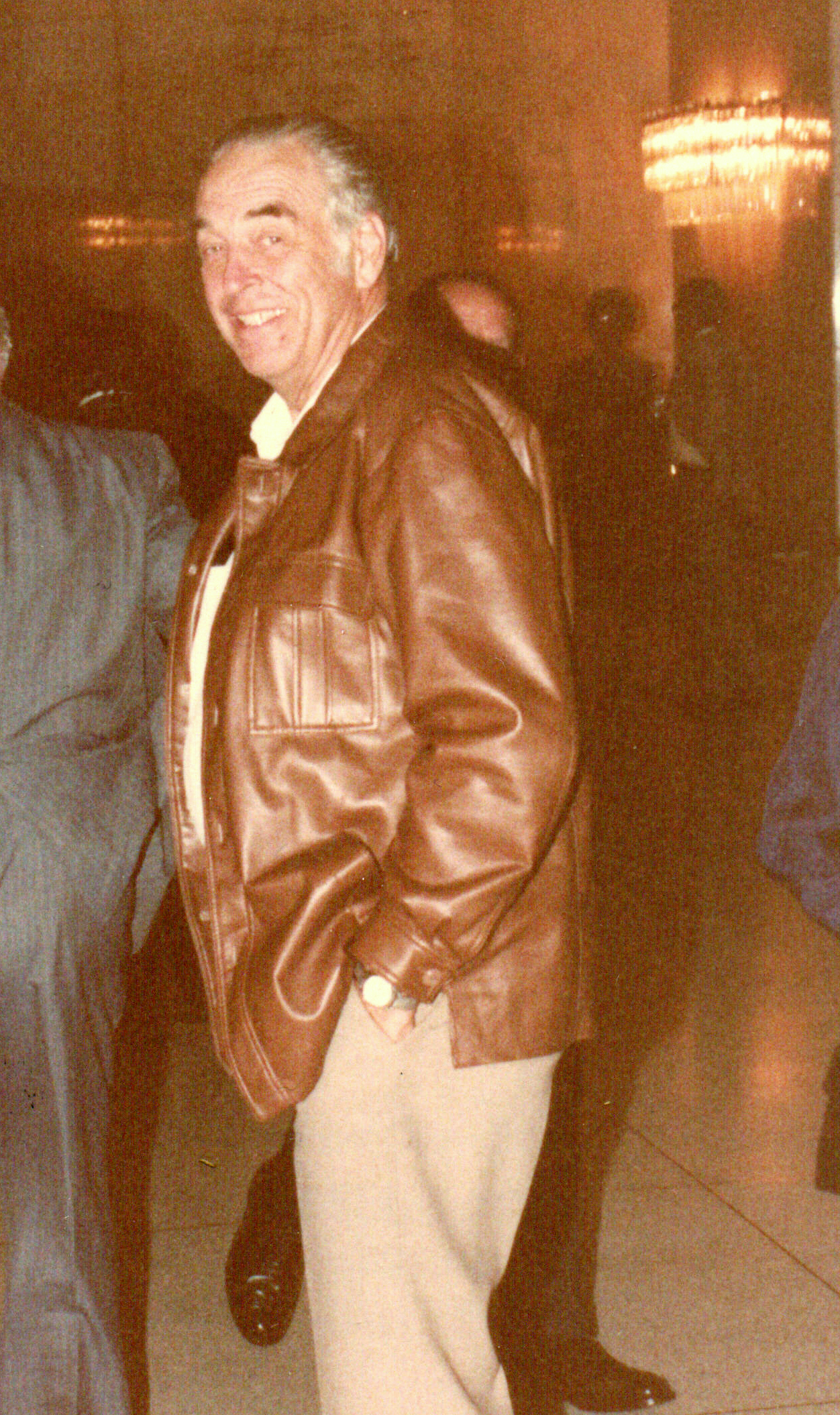
- Heider in 1984
- Born: May 20, 1922; Sheridan, Oregon, U.S.
- Died: March 22, 1989 (aged 66); Valencia, California, U.S.
- Occupation: Recording engineer
- Years active: 1950s–1980s

Wally Heider (May 20, 1922 – March 22, 1989) was an American recording engineer and recording studio owner who refined and advanced the art of studio and remote recording and was instrumental in recording the San Francisco Sound in the late 1960s and early 1970s, recording notable acts including Jefferson Airplane, Crosby, Stills, Nash & Young, Van Morrison, the Grateful Dead, Creedence Clearwater Revival, and Santana.

Heider also amassed a collection of remote recordings of Big Bands broadcasting via radio from the middle 1930s into the 1950s, preserving some of the only known recordings of complete arrangements of many notable artists of the era, including entire sections of arrangements that otherwise had to be cut from recordings made in commercial recording studios, due to timing constraints of recording technology at that time.

== Early life and education ==
Heider was born in Sheridan, Oregon. He attended the University of Oregon music school and played saxophone in a 12-piece band he founded. After bandleaders directed him to turn away from microphones due to his poor playing, he decided to pursue recording instead. Heider earned a law degree from Hastings Law School and worked as an attorney until the mid-1950s.

== Career ==
=== United Recording ===
Heider moved from Oregon to Los Angeles in the late 1950s and was hired by Bill Putnam to work at United Recording as a part-time apprentice, eventually working his way up to apprentice. By 1960, Heider was working as second engineer at United, later taking on the role of chief engineer at Putnam's United Recording Corporation of Nevada (URCON) in Las Vegas, which included both recording studios and a remote recording truck. Heider also leased his mobile recording equipment to United and managed their remote recording business for 18 months.

=== Remote recording ===
Beginning modestly in Los Angeles in 1958 with an Ampex 351 in the back of a station wagon, Heider began to establish remote recording techniques, recording big bands like Woody Herman. By the time Heider's remote recording truck was hired by Capitol Records to record The Beatles at the Hollywood Bowl in 1964, it was a converted 14-foot Dodge box truck, outfitted with a pair of Ampex tape machines and a 12-input, 3-output Universal Audio mixing console built by Bill Putnam. developing remote recording throughout the 1960s and 1970s. Many of Heider's recordings became hits or critical successes. One of them is the classic album Live in Concert by Ray Charles, captured in 1964 at the Shrine Auditorium in Los Angeles. Heider recorded the Monterey Jazz Festival in 1966 and the Monterey Pop Festival in 1967; its many musical acts and the increasing importance of high-quality sound for a concert film signaled a major shift in scale and importance for the remote truck operator.

=== Recording studios ===
Heider established Wally Heider Recording at 1604 N. Cahuenga Boulevard in Hollywood in the early 1960s, recording with musicians like Crosby Stills and Nash and Jefferson Airplane.

After working with Bay Area musicians and doing remote recording at the Monterey Jazz Festival and the Monterey Pop Festival, Heider recognized that musicians involved in the San Francisco Sound were having to travel to Los Angeles or New York to record. In 1969, Heider addressed that need by opening Wally Heider Studios at 245 Hyde Street in San Francisco's Tenderloin District across from the Black Hawk nightclub, where he had recorded a series of Miles Davis's live sessions in the mid '60s.

== Death ==
Heider died of cancer at his daughter's home in Valencia, California, on March 22, 1989, at the age of 66.

== Notable recordings ==
Many of Rolling Stone magazine's Top 500 albums were recorded in Heider's studios including Volunteers by Jefferson Airplane, Everybody Knows This Is Nowhere by Neil Young with Crazy Horse, Déjà Vu by Crosby, Stills, Nash & Young, Electric Warrior by T. Rex, Tupelo Honey by Van Morrison, American Beauty by the Grateful Dead, Green River by Creedence Clearwater Revival, Amazing Grace by Aretha Franklin, Procol Harum Live: In Concert with the Edmonton Symphony Orchestra, and Abraxas by Santana.

=== Big Band era recordings ===
Heider's remote recordings of Big Bands broadcasting via radio from the middle 1930s into the 1950s are a treasure trove of "live" recordings performed by a wide assortment of some of the most notable, (as well as lesser known), big band, jazz and popular artists of the entire period. Many of these broadcast recordings provide some of the only known recordings of complete arrangements by those artists, and include entire sections of arrangements that otherwise had to be cut from recordings made in commercial recording studios, because of the timing constraint that was prevalent for records throughout the entire pre-LP recording era. (Recordings made for commercial release on 10" 78-RPM records could not exceed three minutes and thirty seconds of music, and many jukeboxes were automatically timed to change records at 3:20.)

Heider's initial collection of recordings from this era formed the basis of the Hindsight Records catalogue, acquired from Heider in 1979 by Thomas Gramuglia. Through Heider, Hindsight ended up owning over 9,000 copyrights and masters.

After obtaining the rights to Big Band short films of the 1940s and 1950s originally produced to be shown at movie theaters between double features, Heider founded Swing-Time Video, editing the films and reissuing them on videocassette.
