= Swiss Movement =

Live album by Les McCann and Eddie Harris
- Released: 1969
- Recorded: June 21, 1969
- Venue: Montreux Jazz Festival, Montreux, Switzerland
- Genre: Soul jazz
- Length: 39:06
- Label: Atlantic
- Producer: Nesuhi Ertegün, Bob Emmer

Eddie Harris chronology
High Voltage (1969)	Swiss Movement (1969)	Free Speech (1969)

Les McCann chronology
Much Les (1968)	Swiss Movement (1969)	Comment (1969)

Swiss Movement is a soul jazz live album recorded on June 21, 1969 at the Montreux Jazz Festival in Switzerland by the Les McCann trio, with saxophonist Eddie Harris and trumpeter Benny Bailey. The album was a hit record, as was the accompanying single "Compared to What", with both selling millions of units.

== Reception and influence ==
Professional ratings
Review scores
Source	Rating
Allmusic	5/5 stars
DownBeat	2/5 stars
The Rolling Stone Jazz Record Guide	4/5 stars

The album was nominated for a Grammy Award in the category of best jazz performance, small group. It reached No. 1 on Billboard's jazz album chart, No. 2 on the R&B chart, and No. 29 on the LP chart.

Harvey Pekar, writing for DownBeat in a contemporary review, panned the album as "cliche-ridden".

A Billboard writer commented in 2006 that "what put Montreux on the recorded-live-in-concert map was the legendary Swiss Movement album". Writing in AllMusic, Richie Unterberger calls Swiss Movement "one of the most popular soul jazz albums of all time, and one of the best."

The tapes of this impromptu concert were originally recorded by the festival's organisers and then passed on to Atlantic, who decided to release them after paying a fee of less than $100.

McCann and Harris teamed up again for a follow-up recording, Second Movement, released in 1971.

== Track listing ==
1. "Compared to What" – (Gene McDaniels): 8:41
2. "Cold Duck Time" – (Eddie Harris): 6:31
3. "Kathleen's Theme" – (Les McCann): 5:45
4. "You Got It in Your Soulness" – (Les McCann): 7:08
5. "The Generation Gap" – (Les McCann): 8:45
6. "Kaftan" – (Leroy Vinnegar) – bonus track on the 1996 reissue

== Personnel ==
- Eddie Harris – tenor saxophone
- Les McCann – piano, vocals on "Compared to What"
- Benny Bailey – trumpet
- Leroy Vinnegar – bass
- Donald Dean – drums
