= Lou Pardini =

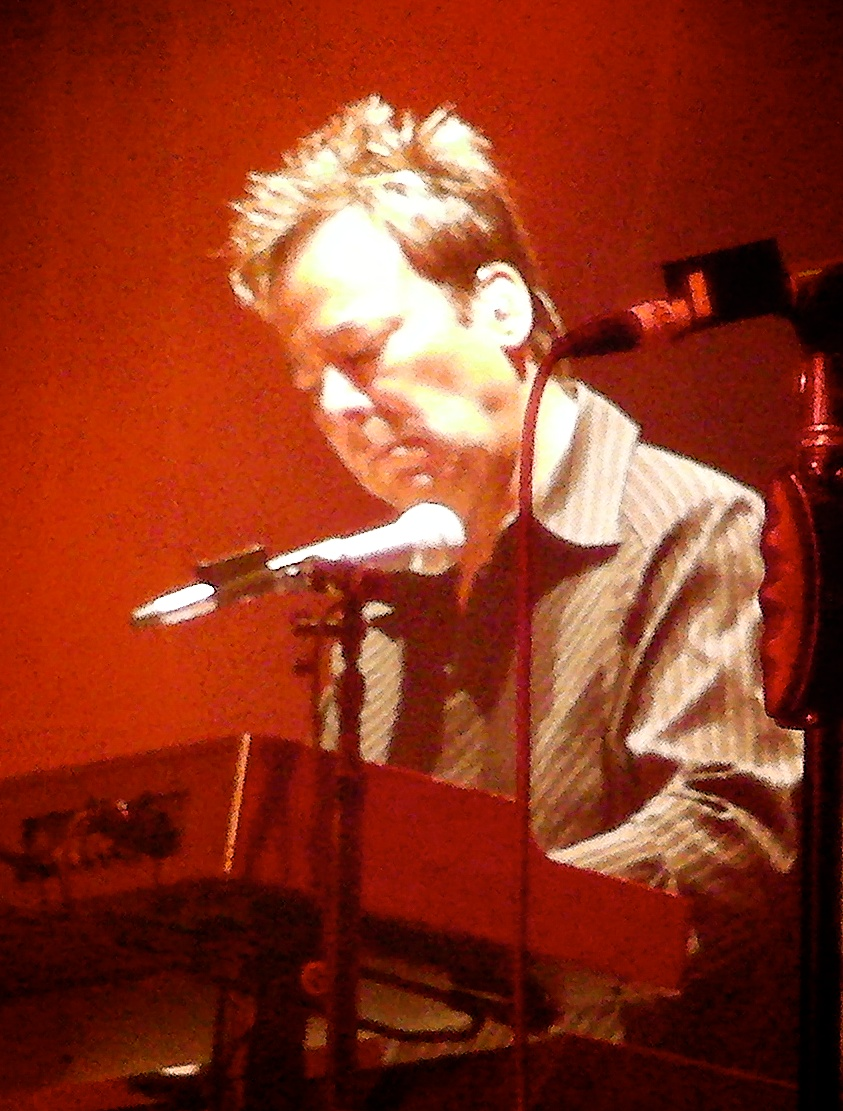
- Lou Pardini, playing keyboards at a 2013 Chicago concert

Background information
- Born: Louis Joseph Pardini; June 5, 1952 (age 74)
- Genres: Progressive rock, jazz fusion, soft rock
- Occupation: Musician
- Formerly of: Chicago
- Website: Official personal website Official Myspace

Lou Pardini (born June 5, 1952) is an American Grammy-nominated keyboardist, songwriter and vocalist who is now best known as a former member of the rock band Chicago. He is known for his work with notable musicians such as Stevie Wonder, Santana, Elton John, Peabo Bryson, Earth, Wind, & Fire and The Doobie Brothers, and he has written hit songs for Patti Austin, Kenny G, The Temptations, and more.

== Current career ==
Lou sang his popular song “I’m Gonna Wait For Your Love” duet with Saxophonist Eric Marienthal's 1989 album was released by Verve Music (Formerly GRP Records) in 1989, and also the single because mostly worldwide including the Philippines. His Grammy-nominated song "Just to See Her", recorded by Smokey Robinson, also won Robinson his first ever Grammy for the Best Male R&B Vocal performance. The song "What Might Have Been" recorded by Pardini on his solo album titled Live and Let Live has also been a popular favorite in Asia, particularly in the Philippines and Japan, and also in Europe.

As a composer and artist, Pardini's credits include a library of music featured on TV and film such as Romance and Cigarettes, written and directed by John Turturro and starring Kate Winslet and James Gandolfini, and the movie Blue, directed by Ryan Minningham.

In August 2009, Pardini answered Bill Champlin's departure as keyboardist and vocalist in the multi-platinum band, Chicago.

It's a huge honor to be a member of a band that I've loved for so many years ... The first time I found myself on stage actually performing Beginnings with the real Chicago, I had an out-of-body experience. I've worked with many great artists and musicians, but it’s another thing entirely to be a part of a legend.

— Lou Pardini

On January 21, 2022, he announced his departure from Chicago in a Facebook group post.
