= Leroy Vinnegar =

American jazz bassist (1928–1999)

- Leroy Vinnegar (1958)

Background information
- Born: July 13, 1928; Indianapolis, Indiana, U.S.
- Died: August 3, 1999 (aged 71) Portland, Oregon, U.S.
- Genres: Jazz
- Occupation: Musician
- Instrument: Double bass

Leroy Vinnegar (July 13, 1928 – August 3, 1999) was an American jazz bassist. Born in Indianapolis, the self-taught Vinnegar established his reputation in Los Angeles during the 1950s and 1960s. His trademark was the rhythmic walking bass line, a steady series of ascending or descending notes, and it brought him the nickname "The Walker". Besides his jazz work, he also appeared on a number of soundtracks and pop albums, notably Van Morrison's 1972 album, Saint Dominic's Preview.

== Music career ==
Vinnegar recorded extensively as a sideman, but also recorded as a leader. He came to public attention in the 1950s as a result of recording with Lee Konitz, André Previn, Stan Getz, Shorty Rogers, Chet Baker, Shelly Manne, Joe Castro, and Serge Chaloff. He played bass on Previn and Manne's My Fair Lady album (1956) and on Eddie Harris and Les McCann's Swiss Movement live album (1969), two of the most commercially successful jazz records ever produced. Vinnegar also performed at the Lighthouse Café in Hermosa Beach, California, and Diggers in East Los Angeles in the late 1950s, with drummer and pianist Don Joham along with other musicians.

Vinnegar along with guitarist Willie Chambers backed Luke "Long Gone" Miles on his Country Born album that was released on World Pacific Records in 1964.

He moved to Portland, Oregon, in 1986. In 1995, the Oregon state legislature honored him by proclaiming May 1 Leroy Vinnegar Day. Vinnegar died of a heart attack, at the age of 71, on August 3, 1999, in a hospital in Portland.

== Discography ==
=== As leader ===
- Leroy Walks! (Contemporary, 1958)
- Leroy Walks Again!! (Contemporary, 1963)
- Jazz's Great "Walker" (Vee Jay, 1964)
- Glass of Water (Legend, 1973)
- The Kid (PBR, 1974; Q-Tape, 2005)
- Walkin' the Basses (Contemporary, 1992)

=== As sideman ===
With Pepper Adams

- Pepper Adams Quintet (Mode, 1956)

With Stan Getz and Lionel Hampton

- Hamp and Getz (Norgran, 1955)

With Chet Baker

- Quartet: Russ Freeman/Chet Baker (Pacific Jazz, 1956)

With Tom Ball and Kenny Sultan

- Who Drank My Beer? (Kicking Mule, 1983)
- Bloodshot Eyes (Flying Fish, 1986)

With Conte Candoli

- West Coast Wailers (Atlantic, 1955) with Lou Levy
- Little Band Big Jazz (Crown, 1960)

With Benny Carter

- Jazz Giant (Contemporary, 1958)
- Swingin' the '20s (Contemporary, 1958)
- Sax ala Carter! (United Artists, 1960)
- BBB & Co. (Swingville, 1962) with Ben Webster and Barney Bigard

With Joe Castro

- Live at Falcon's Lair! (Pablo, 1956)
- Groove Funk Soul (Atlantic, 1959)
- At Falcon's Lair with Joe Castro (1959)

With Serge Chaloff

- Blue Serge (Capitol, 1956)

With Dolo Coker

- Dolo! (Xanadu, 1976)
- California Hard (Xanadu, 1977)
- Third Down (Xanadu, 1977)
- Xanadu in Africa (Xanadu, 1980) with Al Cohn, Billy Mitchell and Frank Butler
- Night Flight to Dakar (Xanadu, 1980) with Al Cohn, Billy Mitchell and Frank Butler

With Buddy Collette

- Nice Day with Buddy Collette (Contemporary, 1957)

With Sonny Criss

- Saturday Morning (Xanadu, 1975)

With The Doors

- Waiting for the Sun (Elektra, 1968)

With Barbara Dane & Earl Hines

- Livin' with the Blues (Dot, 1959)

With Kenny Dorham

- Inta Somethin' (Pacific Jazz, 1961)

With Kenny Drew

- Talkin' & Walkin' (Jazz: West, 1955)
- Home Is Where the Soul Is (Xanadu, 1978)
- For Sure! (Xanadu, 1978)

With Harry Edison

- "Sweets" for the Sweet (Sue, 1964)

With Teddy Edwards

- Teddy Edwards at Falcon's Lair (MetroJazz, 1958)
- It's About Time (Pacific Jazz, 1959)
- Sunset Eyes (Pacific Jazz, 1960)
- Teddy's Ready! (Contemporary, 1960)
- Good Gravy! (Contemporary, 1961)
- Heart & Soul (Contemporary, 1962)
- Young at Heart (Storyville, 1979) with Howard McGhee
- Wise in Time (Storyville, 1979) with Howard McGhee
- Mississippi Lad (Verve/Gitanes, 1991)

With Victor Feldman

- Vic Feldman on Vibes (Mode, 1957)

With Red Garland

- Keystones! (Xanadu, 1977)

With Stan Getz

- West Coast Jazz (Norgran, 1955)
- Hamp and Getz (Verve, 1955)
- Stan Getz and the Cool Sounds (Verve, 1953–55, [1957])
- The Steamer (Verve, 1956)

With Dexter Gordon

- Daddy Plays the Horn (Bethlehem, 1955)
- Dexter Blows Hot and Cool (Dooto, 1955)

With Eddie Harris and Les McCann

- Swiss Movement (Atlantic, 1969)

With Hampton Hawes

- The Sermon (Contemporary, 1958 [1987])
- Something Special (Contemporary, 1976 [1994])

With Elmo Hope

- The Elmo Hope Quintet featuring Harold Land (Pacific Jazz, 1957)

With The Jazz Crusaders

- Live at the Lighthouse '66 (Pacific Jazz, 1966)
- Talk That Talk (Pacific Jazz, 1966)

With Fred Katz

- Fred Katz and his Jammers (Decca, 1959)

With Barney Kessel

- Let's Cook! (Contemporary, 1957 [1962])

With Eric Kloss

- First Class Kloss! (Prestige, 1967)

With Harold Land

- Harold in the Land of Jazz (Contemporary, 1958)

With Gordon Lee

- On the Shoulders of Giants (Unity Label Group, 1994)

With Shelly Manne

- Concerto for Clarinet & Combo (Contemporary, 1955 [1957])
- Swinging Sounds (Contemporary, 1956)
- More Swinging Sounds (Contemporary, 1956)
- Shelly Manne & His Friends (Contemporary, 1956)
- My Fair Lady (Contemporary, 1956)

With Les McCann

- Les McCann Ltd. Plays the Truth (Pacific Jazz, 1960)
- Les McCann Ltd. Plays the Shout (Pacific Jazz, 1960)
- From the Top of the Barrel (Pacific Jazz, 1960 [1967])
- On Time (Pacific Jazz, 1962)
- Les McCann Plays the Hits (Limelight, 1966)
- Bucket o' Grease (Limelight, 1967)
- Much Les (Atlantic, 1968)
- Fish This Week (United Artists, 1973)

With Howard McGhee

- Maggie's Back in Town!! (Contemporary, 1961)
- Young at Heart (Storyville, 1979) with Teddy Edwards
- Wise in Time (Storyville, 1979) with Teddy Edwards

With Frank Morgan

- Frank Morgan (Gene Norman Presents, 1955)

With Van Morrison

- Saint Dominic's Preview (Warner Bros., 1972)

With Gerry Mulligan and Ben Webster

- Gerry Mulligan Meets Ben Webster (Verve, 1959)

With Phineas Newborn, Jr.

- The Great Jazz Piano of Phineas Newborn Jr. (Contemporary, 1963)
- The Newborn Touch (Contemporary, 1964)

With Art Pepper

- The Return of Art Pepper (Jazz: West, 1956)

With Carl Perkins

- Introducing Carl Perkins (Dootone, 1956)

With Randy Porter

- Modern Reflections

With Sonny Rollins

- Sonny Rollins and the Contemporary Leaders (Contemporary, 1958)

With Shorty Rogers

- Martians Come Back! (Atlantic, 1955)
- Way Up There (Atlantic, 1955 [1957])

With Jimmy Smith

- Bluesmith (Verve, 1972)

With Sonny Stitt

- Sonny Stitt Blows the Blues (Verve, 1959)
- Saxophone Supremacy (Verve, 1959)
- Sonny Stitt Swings the Most (Verve, 1959)

With Cedar Walton

- Cedar! (Prestige, 1967)

With Tut Taylor

- 12 String Dobro (World Pacific Records, 1964)

With Jessica Williams

- Encounters (Jazz Focus, 1994)
- Encounters II (Jazz Focus, 1997)

With Don Wilkerson

- The Texas Twister (Riverside, 1960)

With Gerald Wilson

- Portraits (Pacific Jazz, 1964)

With Jack Wilson

- The Two Sides of Jack Wilson (Atlantic, 1964)

With Dylan Cramer

- Remembering Sonny Criss (Nagel Heyer 2011)
