= Les McCann =

American jazz pianist and vocalist (1935–2023)

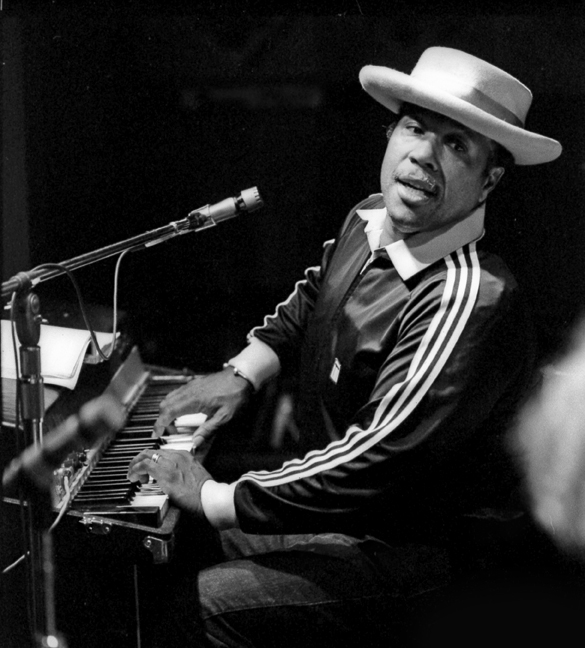
- McCann in 1980

Background information
- Born: Leslie Coleman McCann; September 23, 1935; Lexington, Kentucky, U.S.
- Died: December 29, 2023 (aged 88) Los Angeles, California, U.S.
- Genres: Jazz, soul jazz
- Occupation: Musician
- Instruments: Piano, vocals
- Years active: 1959–2018

Leslie Coleman McCann (September 23, 1935 – December 29, 2023) was an American jazz pianist and vocalist. He is known for his innovations in soul jazz and his 1969 recording of the protest song "Compared to What". His music has been widely sampled in hip hop.

== Early life ==
Leslie Coleman McCann was born in Lexington, Kentucky, on September 23, 1935. He grew up in a musical family with four brothers and one sister, most of whom sang in church choirs. His father was a fan of jazz music and his mother was known to hum opera tunes around the house.

As a youth, McCann played the tuba and drums and performed in his school's marching band. As a pianist, he was largely self-taught. He explained that he received piano lessons for only a few weeks as a six-year-old before his teacher died.

McCann attended Los Angeles City College, which was highly influential to his musical career. At the age of 17, he joined the U.S. Navy in San Diego.

== Career ==
During his service in the Navy, McCann won a singing contest, which led to an appearance on The Ed Sullivan Show. After leaving the Navy, McCann moved to California and played in his own trio. He declined an offer to work in Cannonball Adderley's band so that he could dedicate himself to his own music. The trio's first job was at the Purple Onion club in 1959 accompanying Gene McDaniels.

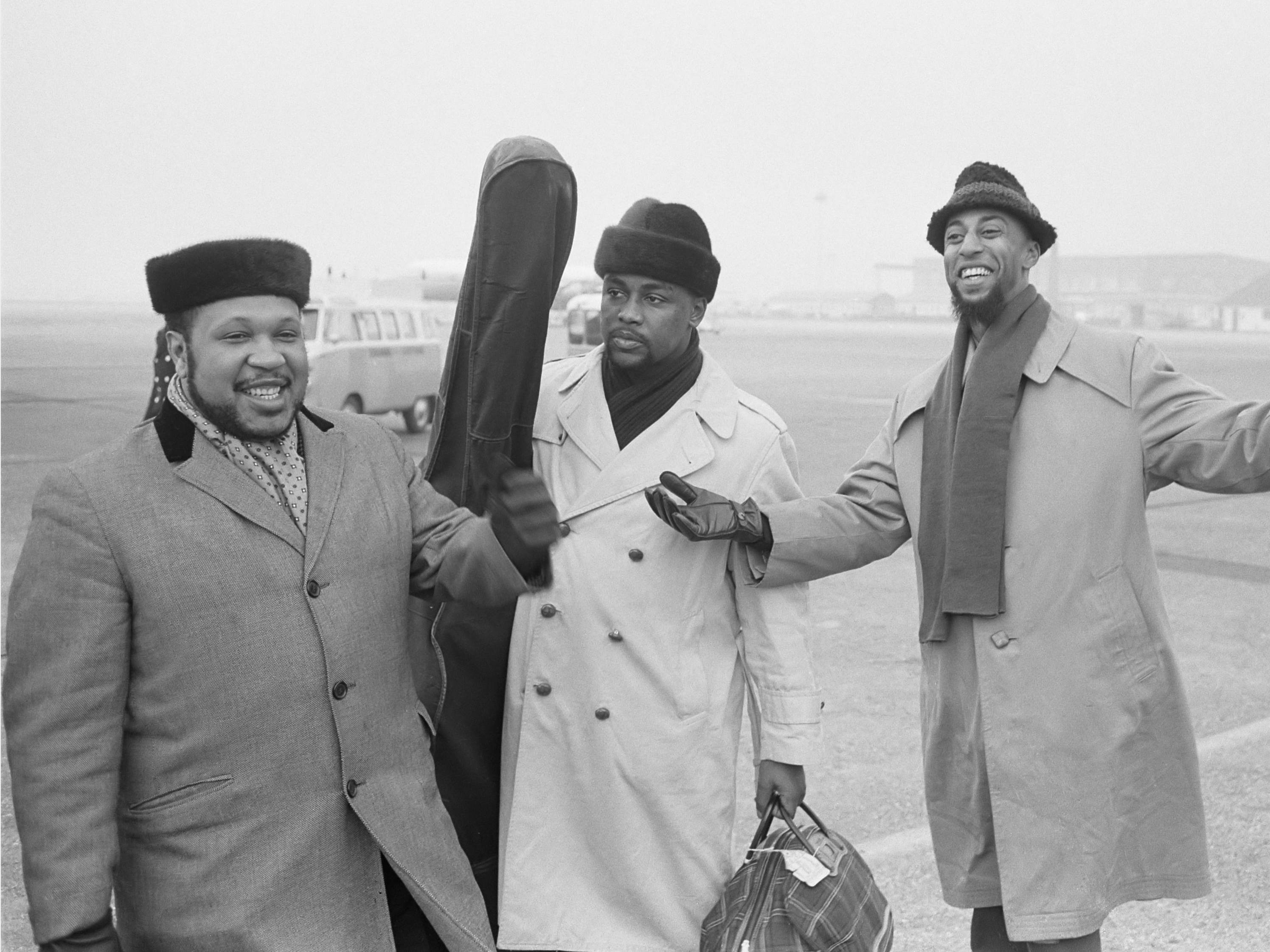
McCann (left) with the Les McCann Trio (Herbie Lewis and Ron Jefferson), 1962

The main part of McCann's career began in the early 1960s, when he recorded as a pianist with his trio for Pacific Jazz. In 1969, Atlantic released Swiss Movement, an album recorded with saxophonist Eddie Harris and trumpeter Benny Bailey earlier at that year's Montreux Jazz Festival. The album contained the song "Compared to What"; both reached the Billboard pop charts. The song, which criticized the Vietnam War, was written by Eugene McDaniels years earlier and recorded and released as a ballad by McCann in 1966 on his album, Les McCann Plays the Hits. Roberta Flack's version appeared as the opening track on her debut album First Take (1969).

After the success of Swiss Movement, McCann, primarily a piano player, emphasized his vocals. He became an innovator in soul jazz, merging jazz with funk, soul and world rhythms. His music was influential for its use of electric piano, clavinet and synthesizer.

In 1971, McCann and Harris were part of a group of soul, R&B and rock performers–including Wilson Pickett, the Staple Singers, Santana and Ike & Tina Turner–who flew to Accra, Ghana, to perform a 14-hour concert for more than 100,000 Ghanaians. The March 6 concert was recorded for the documentary film Soul to Soul. In 2004, the movie was released on DVD with an accompanying soundtrack album.

McCann had a stroke in the mid-1990s, but he returned to music in 2002, when Pump it Up was released, and continued to release music until 2018. He also exhibited his work as a painter and photographer.

== Death ==
McCann died from pneumonia in a Los Angeles hospital on December 29, 2023, at age 88.

== Legacy ==
McCann's recordings have been widely sampled in hip hop music, mostly in the 1990s and 2000s, by nearly 300 acts. These include A Tribe Called Quest, Cypress Hill, De La Soul, the Notorious B.I.G., Sean Combs, Dr. Dre, Snoop Dogg, Nas, Mary J. Blige, the Pharcyde, Eric B. & Rakim, Mobb Deep, Gang Starr and Raekwon.

== Discography ==
=== As leader ===
- Les McCann Ltd. Plays the Truth (Pacific Jazz, 1960)
- Les McCann Ltd. Plays the Shout (Pacific Jazz, 1960; Sunset, 1970)
- Les McCann Ltd. in San Francisco (Pacific Jazz, 1961)
- Pretty Lady (Pacific Jazz, 1961)
- Les McCann Sings with Gerald Wilson (Pacific Jazz, 1961)
- Les McCann Ltd. in New York (Pacific Jazz, 1962)
- Somethin' Special with Richard "Groove" Holmes (Pacific Jazz, 1962)
- On Time (Pacific Jazz, 1962)
- Les McCann Ltd. Plays the Shampoo (Pacific Jazz, 1963)
- The Gospel Truth (Pacific Jazz, 1963)
- Soul Hits (Pacific Jazz, 1963)
- Jazz Waltz with the Jazz Crusaders (Pacific Jazz, 1964)
- McCanna (Pacific Jazz, 1964)
- McCann/Wilson with Gerald Wilson (Pacific Jazz, 1965)
- But Not Really (Limelight, 1965)
- Beaux J. Pooboo (Limelight, 1965)
- Spanish Onions (Pacific Jazz, 1966)
- A Bag of Gold (Pacific Jazz, 1966)
- Live at Shelly's Manne-Hole (Limelight, 1966)
- Les McCann Plays the Hits (Limelight, 1966)
- From the Top of the Barrel (Pacific Jazz, 1967)
- Bucket o' Grease (Limelight, 1967)
- Live at Bohemian Caverns–Washington, D.C. (Limelight, 1967)
- More or Les McCann (World Pacific, 1969)
- Much Les (Atlantic, 1969)
- Swiss Movement with Eddie Harris (Atlantic, 1969)
- New from the Big City (World Pacific, 1970)
- Comment (Atlantic, 1970)
- Second Movement with Eddie Harris (Atlantic, 1971)
- Invitation to Openness (Atlantic, 1972)
- Talk to the People (Atlantic, 1972)
- Live at Montreux (Atlantic, 1973)
- Layers (Atlantic, 1973)
- Another Beginning (Atlantic, 1974)
- Doldinger Jubilee '75 (Atlantic, 1975)
- Hustle to Survive (Atlantic, 1975)
- River High, River Low (Atlantic, 1976)
- Music Lets Me Be (ABC/Impulse!, 1977)
- Change, Change, Change (ABC/Impulse!, 1977)
- The Man (A&M, 1978)
- Tall, Dark & Handsome (A&M, 1979)
- The Longer You Wait (Jam, 1983)
- Music Box (Jam, 1984)
- Road Warriors with Houston Person (Greene Street, 1984)
- Butterfly (Stone, 1988)
- Les Is More (Night, 1990)
- On the Soul Side (MusicMasters, 1994)
- Listen Up! (MusicMasters, 1996)
- Pacifique with Joja Wendt (MusicMasters, 1998)
- How's Your Mother? (32 Jazz, 1998)
- Pump It Up (ESC, 2002)
- Vibrations: Funkin' Around Something Old Something New (Jazz Legend Project) (Leafage Jazz/Pony Canyon, 2003)
- The Shout (American Jazz Classics, 2011) CD reissue with 6 bonus tracks
- 28 Juillet (Fremeaux, 2018)

=== As sideman ===
- Teddy Edwards, It's About Time (Pacific Jazz, 1960)
- Richard "Groove" Holmes, Groove (Pacific Jazz, 1961)
- Richard "Groove" Holmes, Tell It Like It Tis (Pacific Jazz, 1961)
- Lou Rawls, Stormy Monday (Capitol, 1962)
- Stanley Turrentine, That's Where It's At (Blue Note, 1962)
- Clifford Scott, Out Front (Pacific Jazz, 1963)
- Stanley Turrentine, Straight Ahead (Blue Note, 1985)
- Cash McCall, Cash Up Front (Stone, 1988)
- Herbie Mann, Deep Pocket (Kokopelli, 1994)
- Bill Evans, Soul Insider (ESC Records, 2000)
