= Thurman Green =

American jazz trombonist

Thurman Green (August 12, 1940 – June 19, 1997) was an American jazz trombonist. He was a member of the Horace Tapscott Quintet and the Clayton-Hamilton Jazz Orchestra.

Green and Hamiet Bluiett were at the Navy School of Music together in 1962. More than thirty years later, Bluiett produced and performed on Green's only album as a leader, Dance of the Night Creatures on Mapleshade Records. They began recording in 1994, and Green died in 1997 at the age of 57. Mapleshade released the album in 1999.

== Discography ==
- Cross Current (B.J. Records, 1988) as Thurman Green Trio
- Dance of the Night Creatures (Mapleshade, 1999)

=== As sideman ===
With Gerald Wilson

- Live and Swinging (Pacific Jazz, 1967)
- Everywhere (Pacific Jazz, 1968)
- California Soul (Pacific Jazz, 1968)
- Eternal Equinox (Pacific Jazz, 1969)
- Lomelin (Discovery, 1981)
- Jessica (Trend, 1982)
- Calafia (Trend, 1985)
- Jenna (Discovery, 1989)
- State Street Sweet (MAMA, 1995)

With Clayton-Hamilton Jazz Orchestra

- 1990 Groove Shop
- 1991 Heart and Soul
- 1995 Absolutely!

With others

- 1969 Electric Connection, Jean-Luc Ponty
- 1971 Things Ain't What They Used to Be (And You Better Believe It), Ella Fitzgerald
- 1972 Ethiopian Knights, Donald Byrd
- 1974 Adam's Apple, Doug Carn
- 1975 Inner Glow, Bobby Hutcherson
- 1977 Tomorrow Is Here, Willie Bobo
- 1980 California Message, Benny Golson
- 1984 The Poet II, Bobby Womack
- 1987 Before My Time, Lol Coxhill
- 1987 E-bone-ix, Buster Cooper
- 1988 Tribute to Count Basie, Gene Harris
- 1989 Boogie Down, Ernestine Anderson
- 1990 Rhythm, Blues Soul & Grooves, Bobby King
- 1991 Dingo, Miles Davis and Michel Legrand
- 1991 Unforgettable, Natalie Cole
- 1993 Blue Saxophone, Teddy Edwards
- 1995 Afterglow, Dr. John
- 1995 In a Hefti Bag, Frank Capp
- 1996 Their Time Was the Greatest, Louie Bellson
