= Sean Jones (trumpeter) =

American jazz trumpeter (born 1978)

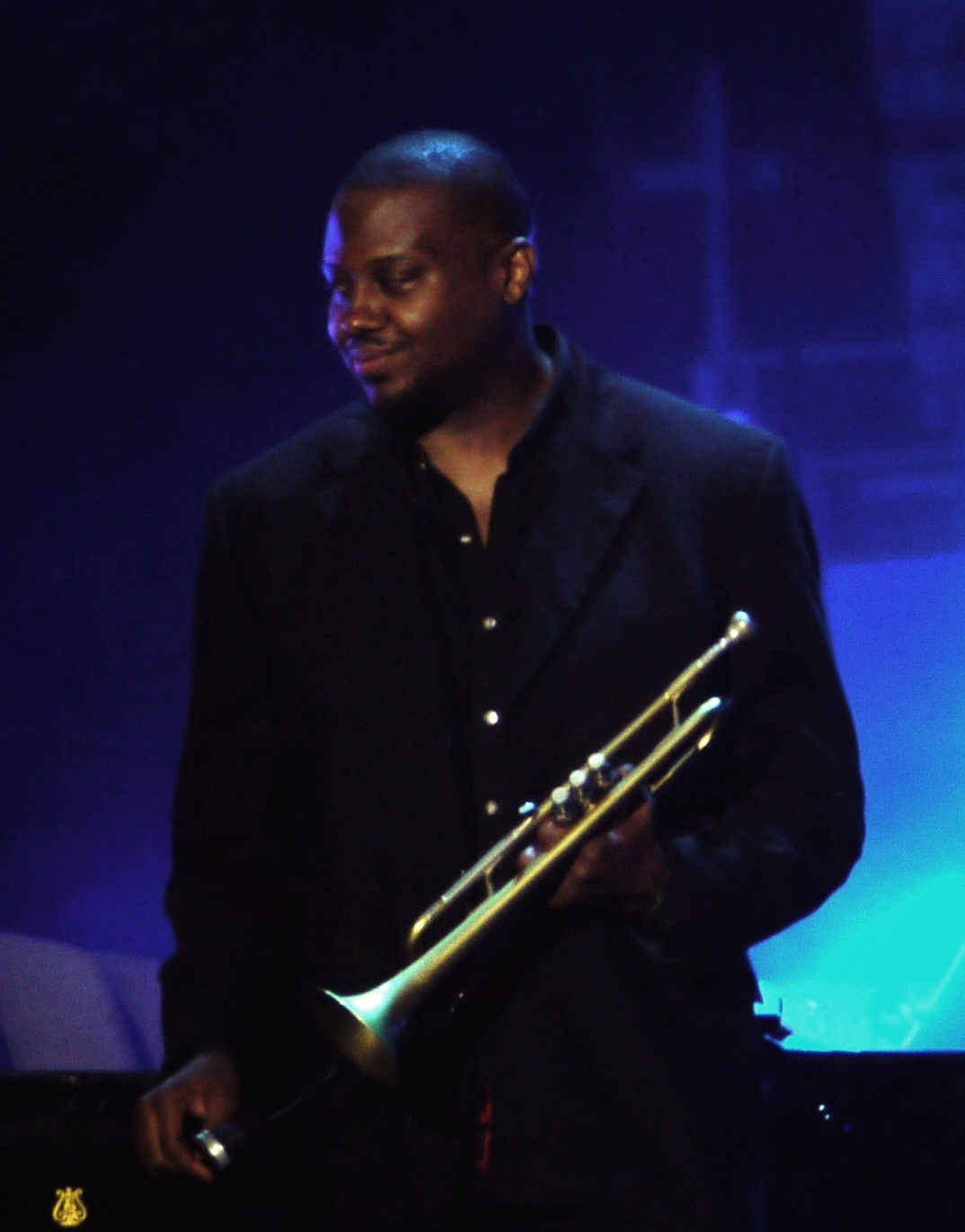
- Jones in 2011

Background information
- Born: May 29, 1978 (age 48); Warren, Ohio, U.S.
- Genre: Jazz
- Occupations: Musician; composer; bandleader; educator
- Instruments: Trumpet; flugelhorn
- Years active: 2002–present
- Label: Mack Avenue
- Education: Rutgers University

Sean Jones (born May 29, 1978, in Warren, Ohio) is an American jazz trumpeter and composer. He was featured on the 2007 Grammy Award–winning album Turned to Blue by Nancy Wilson, and as a bandleader, has released eight albums under the Mack Avenue label. Jones performs with his own groups both nationally and internationally, at music venues and jazz festivals including the Monterey Jazz Festival, Detroit International Jazz Festival, Vail Jazz Festival, and the Montreal International Jazz Festival.

== Biography ==
Among Jones's first musical experiences was the gospel music he heard while attending Saint James' Church of God in Christ in Warren, Ohio, where he sang and performed with the choir. As a beginning musician, Jones started on the drums and switched to trumpet in the fifth grade after his grandmother told him about his grandfather playing the instrument during World War II. Jones developed an interest in jazz around the same time, after receiving two Miles Davis albums from his band instructor, namely Kind of Blue and Tutu.

By the time he entered Warren G. Harding High School, Jones had decided to pursue a career as a professional musician and studied classical trumpet as well as jazz. In 2000, he obtained a master's degree from Rutgers University, where he studied under professor William Fielder, who had also taught Wynton Marsalis, among others. As a session musician, Jones has performed with several notable ensembles and musicians, including Tia Fuller, Gerald Wilson, Joe Lovano, Tom Harrell, Marcus Miller, Jon Faddis, Jimmy Heath, and Frank Foster.

In 2004, Jones had a six-month stint with the Jazz at Lincoln Center Orchestra, after which Marsalis offered him a position with the ensemble as third trumpet, then moved to the lead chair a couple months later. Around the same time, Jones became a music professor at Duquesne University and lived in the Pittsburgh area for several years.

In 2011, he performed "A Tribute to Miles" with Wayne Shorter, Herbie Hancock, Marcus Miller, and Sean Rickman.

Jones was recently selected as the Interim Artistic Director for the Cleveland Jazz Orchestra. He became an associate professor of Jazz Trumpet at Oberlin Conservatory for the 2012–2013 academic year. He was a member of the SFJAZZ Collective from 2015 to 2017. He previously served as head of the Brass Department at Berklee College of Music, and he currently serves as the chair of the jazz studies department of the Peabody Institute at Johns Hopkins University in Baltimore. Jones is also on the board of directors and is president-elect of the Jazz Education Network (JEN).

Jones is currently represented by Unlimited Myles, Inc.

== Awards and nominations ==
- 2006: Downbeat – Rising Star
- 2007: Jazz Journalists Association – Trumpeter of the Year (nominated)
- 2007: JazzTimes Readers' Poll – Best New Artist
- 2007: DownBeat – Rising Star

== Discography ==
=== As leader ===
- 2004: Eternal Journey (Mack Avenue)
- 2005: Gemini (Mack Avenue)
- 2006: Roots (Mack Avenue)
- 2007: Kaleidoscope (Mack Avenue)
- 2009: The Search Within (Mack Avenue)
- 2011: No Need for Words (Mack Avenue)
- 2014: Im*pro*vise: Never Before Seen (Mack Avenue)
- 2017: Live from Jazz at the Bistro (Mack Avenue)

=== As sideman ===
- Charles Fambrough, Live @ Zanzibar Blue (2002)
- Gerald Wilson Orchestra, New York, New Sound (Mack Avenue, 2003)
- Gerald Wilson Orchestra, In My Time (Mack Avenue, 2005)
- Ron Blake, Sonic Tonic (Mack Avenue, 2005)
- Teddy Pantelas Trio, It Makes Me Glad (Tatsou, 2006)
- Nancy Wilson, Turned to Blue (MCG Jazz, 2006)
- Tia Fuller, Healing Space (Mack Avenue, 2007)
- Gerald Wilson Orchestra, Monterey Moods (Mack Avenue, 2007)
- Steve Turre, Rainbow People (HighNote, 2008)
- Gerald Wilson Orchestra, Detroit (Mack Avenue, 2009)
- Ralph Bowen, Dedicated (Posi-Tone, 2009)
- Ralph Bowen, Due Reverence (Posi-Tone, 2010)
- Tia Fuller, Decisive Steps (Mack Avenue, 2010)
- Gerald Wilson Orchestra, Legacy (Mack Avenue, 2011)
- Ernie Krivda, Blues for Pekar (Capri, 2011) – with Ernie Krivda and Dominick Farinacci
- Brandee Younger, Soul Awakening (independent, 2019)
- Emmet Cohen, Uptown in Orbit (Mack Avenue, 2022)

=== Compilations ===
- 2006: Legends & Lions: Blues (Mack Avenue)
- 2006: Legends & Lions: Swoonin' (Mack Avenue)
- 2006: Legends & Lions: Swingin' (Mack Avenue)
- 2007: Compilations (Tri-Valley YMCA)
- 2014: Live from the Detroit Jazz Festival – 2013 (Mack Avenue)
- 2014: It's Christmas on Mack Avenue (Mack Avenue)
