= New York, New Sound =

Studio album by Gerald Wilson Orchestra
- Released: August 25, 2003
- Recorded: February 2003
- Studio: Clinton Recording Studio, NYC
- Genre: Jazz
- Length: 76:29
- Label: Mack Avenue; MAC 1009
- Producer: Stix Hooper

Gerald Wilson chronology
Theme for Monterey (1998)	New York, New Sound (2003)	In My Time (2005)

New York, New Sound is an album by the Gerald Wilson Orchestra recorded in 2003 and released on the Mack Avenue label.

== Reception ==
Professional ratings
Review scores
Source	Rating
AllMusic	3/5 stars
The Penguin Guide to Jazz Recordings	4/4 stars

AllMusic rated the album with 3 stars; in his review, Alex Henderson noted: "Wilson's musical personality is very much in evidence -- and his personality is that of an arranger/bandleader, not a hotshot soloist. Wilson prefers to leave the soloing to other people, which is something he has long had in common with Duke Ellington". In JazzTimes Ira Gitler wrote: "Hats off to the all-star band, but especially Wilson for the intersectional sonic vibrancy and overall dynamics he gave them to work with". On All About Jazz Russell Moon noted: "There is good and bad news here. The good news is that the album is terrific. Many jazz fans will be introduced to Wilson's talent through this album, and will seek more. No doubt Gerald Wilson will be in demand because of this album. The bad news is that the New Sound of New York isn't as good as the old sound of Los Angeles to this listener's ears... So give Gerald Wilson full marks for the courage to take on some of his best work and give it a new visage". The Penguin Guide to Jazz Recordings describes it as “a record any jazz lover should be delighted to hear.”

== Track listing ==
All compositions by Gerald Wilson except where noted.

1. "Milestones" (Miles Davis) - 7:28
2. "Blues for the Count" - 9:55
3. "Equinox" (John Coltrane) - 6:42
4. "Viva Tirado (Mucho Mas)" - 9:14
5. "Teri" - 3:37
6. "Blues for Yna Yna" - 8:08
7. "Theme for Monterey" - 14:51
8. "M Capetillo" - 4:53
9. "Josefina" - 5:16
10. "Nancy Jo" - 6:08

== Personnel ==
- Gerald Wilson - arranger, conductor
- Clark Terry - trumpet, flugelhorn (tracks 2 & 6)
- Jon Faddis (tracks 1, 2, 5, 6, 8, 9 & 10), Frank Greene (tracks 3, 4 & 7), Eddie Henderson, Sean Jones, Jimmy Owens - trumpet
- Luis Bonilla, Benny Powell, Douglas Purviance, Dennis Wilson - trombone
- Jerry Dodgion - alto saxophone, flute
- Jesse Davis - alto saxophone
- Frank Wess - tenor saxophone, flute
- Jimmy Heath - tenor saxophone
- Kenny Barron (tracks 1, 2, 5, 6, 8, 9 & 10), Renee Rosnes (tracks 3, 4 & 7) - piano
- Oscar Castro-Neves (track 8), Anthony Wilson - guitar
- Bob Cranshaw (tracks 2, 3 & 6), Trey Henry (tracks 5, 7 & 9), Larry Ridley (tracks 1, 4, 6, 8 & 10) - bass
- Stix Hooper (tracks 2–4 & 7), Lewis Nash (tracks: 1, 5, 6 & 8–10) - drums
