= Douglas Purviance =

American jazz trombonist (born 1952)

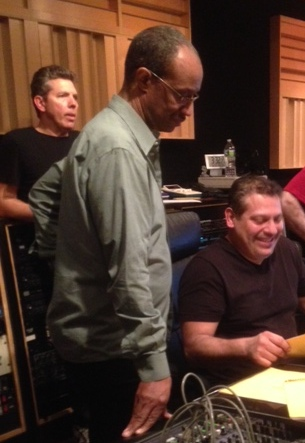
- Purviance (center) listening to playback at Systems Two Recording Studio, Brooklyn, NY, 2014

Background information
- Born: July 18, 1952 (age 74)
- Genres: Jazz
- Occupation: Musician
- Instrument: Trombone
- Years active: 1975–present
- Formerly of: Stan Kenton Orchestra; the Thad Jones/Mel Lewis Orchestra; Carnegie Hall Jazz Band; Mingus Big Band; Vanguard Jazz Orchestra

Douglas Purviance (born July 18, 1952, in Turner Station, Maryland) is an American jazz trombonist. He began his professional career as a member of the Stan Kenton Orchestra, playing bass trombone and tuba from 1975 to 1977. Mostly, he works as a studio session bass trombonist and is not known for improvising.

He graduated from Towson State University in 1975 and obtained a master's degree from the Manhattan School of Music in 1992. He settled in New York City in 1977, playing a variety of commercial and jazz trombone jobs and eventually winning a chair in the Thad Jones/Mel Lewis Orchestra. He was a charter member of the Carnegie Hall Jazz Band and has toured extensively with Slide Hampton, Steve Turre, Dizzy Gillespie, and the Mingus Big Band. He has appeared as an incidental player on hundreds of recordings, notably on Grammy-nominated albums by Joe Henderson and the Vanguard Jazz Orchestra.

On February 8, 2009, he won a Grammy Award as co-producer in the Best Large Jazz Ensemble Album category for Monday Night Live at the Village Vanguard, by the Vanguard Jazz Orchestra. For the same ensemble, he worked as co-producer and trombonist on the Grammy-nominated album OverTime: Music of Bob Brookmeyer (2014), and in the same roles for the album Mists: Charles Ives for Jazz Orchestra (2014).

== Discography ==
=== As sideman ===
With Dizzy Gillespie

- Things to Come (MCG, 2002)
- Dizzy's Business (MCG, 2006)
- I'm BeBoppin' Too (Half Note, 2008)

With Slide Hampton

- World of Trombones (West 54, 1979)
- Dedicated to Diz (Telarc, 1993)
- Slide Plays Jobim (Alleycat, 2002)
- Spirit of the Horn (MCG, 2002)

With Stan Kenton

- Kenton '76 (Creative World, 1976)
- Journey Into Capricorn (Creative World, 1976)
- Live in Europe (Decca, 1977)

With Mel Lewis

- Live in Montreux (MPS, 1981)
- 20 Years at the Village Vanguard (Atlantic, 1986)
- Soft Lights and Hot Music (Musicmasters, 1988)
- The Definitive Thad Jones (Musicmasters, 1989)
- To You: A Tribute to Mel Lewis (Musicmasters, 1991)

With Steve Turre

- Sanctified Shells (Antilles, 1993)
- Rhythm Within (Antilles, 1995)
- Steve Turre (Verve, 1997)
- One4J (Telarc, 2003)

With Vanguard Jazz Orchestra

- Lickety Split (New World, 1997)
- Thad Jones Legacy (New World, 1999)
- Can I Persuade You? (Planet Arts, 2001)
- The Way (Planet Arts, 2004)
- Up from the Skies (Planet Arts, 2006)
- Monday Night Live at the Village Vanguard (Planet Arts, 2008)
- Forever Lasting (Planet Arts, 2011)
- OverTime: Music of Bob Brookmeyer (Planet Arts, 2014)

With Gerald Wilson

- New York, New Sound (Mack Avenue, 2003)
- In My Time (Mack Avenue, 2005)
- Monterey Moods (Mack Avenue, 2007)
- Detroit (Mack Avenue, 2009)
- Legacy (Mack Avenue, 2011)

With others

- Mario Bauza, Tanga (Messidor, 1992)
- Dee Dee Bridgewater, Dear Ella (Verve, 1997)
- Michel Camilo, One More Once (Columbia, 1994)
- Richie Cole, Kush (Heads Up, 1995)
- Robin Eubanks, Different Perspectives (Bamboo, 1988)
- Robin Eubanks, More Than Meets the Ear (ArtistShare, 2015)
- Jon Faddis, Hornucopia (Epic, 1991)
- Tom Harrell, Time's Mirror (RCA Victor, 1999)
- Tom Harrell, Wise Children (Bluebird/Arista, 2003)
- Stefon Harris, The Grand Unification Theory (Blue Note, 2003)
- Jimmy Heath, Turn Up the Heath (Planet Arts, 2006)
- Joe Henderson, Big Band (Verve, 1996)
- Christopher Hollyday, And I'll Sing Once More (Novus, 1992)
- Jane Horrocks, The Further Adventures of Little Voice (Liberty, 2000)
- J. J. Johnson, The Brass Orchestra (Verve, 1997)
- Nino Josele, Espanola (DRO, 2009)
- Christian McBride, The Good Feeling (Mack Avenue, 2011)
- Christian McBride, Bringin' It (Mack Avenue, 2017)
- Christian McBride, For Jimmy, Wes and Oliver (Mack Avenue, 2020)
- Arturo O'Farrill, Una Noche Inolvidable (Palmetto, 2005)
- Arturo O'Farrill, Song for Chico (Zoho, 2008)
- Renee Rosnes, Life on Earth (Blue Note, 2001)
- Sam Rivers, Jazzbuhne Berlin '82 (Repertoire, 1990)
- Gary Smulyan, Blue Suite (Criss Cross, 1999)
- Mel Torme, Recorded Live at the Fujitsu-Concord Jazz Festival in Japan '90 (Concord Jazz, 1991)
- Bebo Valdes, Suite Cubana (Calle 54, 2009)
- Bobby Watson, Tailor Made (Columbia, 1993)
- Frank Wess, Entre Nous (Concord Jazz, 1991)
- Nancy Wilson, Turned to Blue (MCG, 2006)
