= Jackie Kelso =

American jazz saxophonist (1922–2012)

- Born: John Joseph Kelson Jr. February 27, 1922; Los Angeles, California, U.S.
- Died: April 28, 2012 (aged 90) Beverly Hills, California
- Genres: Jazz, rock, pop
- Occupation: Musician
- Instruments: Saxophone, flute, clarinet
- Years active: 1940s–1980s

John Joseph Kelson Jr. (February 27, 1922 – April 28, 2012), known professionally as Jackie Kelso, was an American jazz saxophonist, flautist, and clarinetist.

== Biography ==
Born in Los Angeles, California, Kelson was the eldest child of John Joseph Kelson Sr. and Lillian (née Weinberg) Kelson.

He began taking clarinet lessons at age eight, studying with Caughey Roberts. At fifteen, Jefferson High School classmate Chico Hamilton urged him to take up the alto saxophone, and he made his professional debut with Jerome Myart that same year. By the time he graduated from Jefferson, he was playing with Hamilton, Buddy Collette, and Charles Mingus at clubs on Central Avenue.

In the 1940s he played with Barney Bigard, Marshal Royal, Lucky Thompson, Kid Ory, Benny Carter, Benny Goodman, Lionel Hampton, and Roy Milton. He enlisted in the Navy in October 1942 with Marshal and Ernie Royal, and, after training at Camp Robert Smalls, he was stationed with the Royals with the St Mary's College Pre-Flight School band.

In the 1950s he also performed with Johnny Otis, Billy Vaughan, Nelson Riddle, Bill Berry, Ray Anthony, the Capp-Pierce Juggernaut, Bob Crosby, C.L. Burke, and Duke Ellington. He joined Gene Vincent and His Blue Caps in 1958 and was featured on several of their recordings from that period, including "Say Mama", "She She Little Sheila", and "Ac-Cent-Tchu-Ate the Positive". He worked as a studio musician between 1964 and 1984, in addition to recording with Mercer Ellington and Mink DeVille, touring worldwide with Hampton, Ellington, and Vaughan, and appearing in The Concert for Bangladesh. He also probably provided the uncredited flute solo in the middle of The Left Banke's 1966 hit, "Walk Away Renee".

Kelso semi-retired from music in 1984, but returned to performance in 1995 with the Count Basie Orchestra, where he became a regular in 1998. He reverted to his birth name of Kelson that year as well. He died on April 28, 2012, in Beverly Hills, California, aged 90.

== Discography ==
With David Axelrod

- Earth Rot (Capitol, 1970)
- The Auction (Decca, 1972)
- Heavy Axe (Fantasy, 1974)
- Strange Ladies (MCA, 1977)
- Marchin (MCA, 1980)

With José Feliciano

- Compartments (RCA Victor, 1973)
- For My Love...Mother Music (RCA Victor, 1974)
- Just Wanna Rock 'n' Roll (RCA Victor, 1975)
- Angela (Private Stock, 1976)

With Lionel Hampton

- Aurex Jazz Festival '81 (EastWorld, 1981)
- Leapin' with Lionel (Affinity, 1983)
- Ambassador at Large (Glad-Hamp, 1990)

With Johnny Rivers

- L.A. Reggae (United Artists, 1972)
- Blue Suede Shoes (United Artists, 1973)
- New Lovers and Old Friends (Epic, 1975)

With others

- Arthur Adams, It's Private Tonight (Blue Thumb, 1973)
- Cannonball Adderley, Big Man: The Legend of John Henry (Fantasy, 1975)
- Nat Adderley, Double Exposure (Prestige, 1975)
- Count Basie, Count Plays Duke (Mama, 1998)
- Count Basie, Swing Shift (Mama, 1999)
- Barbi Benton, Something New (Playboy, 1976)
- The Blackbyrds, Flying Start (Fantasy, 1974)
- The Blackbyrds, Unfinished Business (Fantasy, 1976)
- Bobby Blue Bland, His California Album (ABC/Dunhill, 1973)
- David Byrne, Music for the Knee Plays (ECM, 1985)
- Brian Cadd, White On White (Capitol, 1976)
- The Capp-Pierce Juggernaut, Play It Again Sam (Concord Jazz, 1997)
- The Capp-Pierce Juggernaut, Juggernaut Strikes Again! (Concord Jazz, 1982)
- Michel Colombier, Old Fool Back On Earth (Columbia, 1983)
- Christopher Cross, Christopher Cross (Warner Bros., 1979)
- Mike Deasy, Letters to My Head (Capitol, 1973)
- Miles Davis & Michel Legrand, Dingo (Warner Bros., 1991)
- Cliff DeYoung, Cliff DeYoung (MCA, 1975)
- Mink DeVille, Return to Magenta (Capitol, 1978)
- Yvonne Elliman, Rising Sun (RSO, 1975)
- Yvonne Elliman, Yvonne (RSO, 1979)
- The Carpenters, Passage (A&M, 1977)
- Harry Chapin, Portrait Gallery (Elektra, 1975)
- Harry Chapin, Living Room Suite (Elektra, 1978)
- Stephen Cohn, Stephen Cohn (Motown, 1973)
- Natalie Cole, Don't Look Back (Capitol, 1980)
- Alice Coltrane, Eternity (Warner Bros., 1976)
- Patti Dahlstrom, Your Place or Mine (20th Century, 1975)
- Patti Dahlstrom, Livin' It Thru (20th Century, 1976)
- Guy Finley, Ignis Fatuus (Tom Cat, 1975)
- Four Tops, Night Lights Harmony (ABC, 1975)
- Foxy, Party Boys (Dash, 1979)
- The Friends of Distinction, Love Can Make It Easier (RCA Victor, 1973)
- Funk, Inc., Superfunk (Prestige, 1973)
- Funk, Inc. Priced to Sell (Prestige, 1974)
- Jerry Garcia, Garcia (Grateful Dead, 1990)
- Chuck Girard, Chuck Girard (Good News, 1974)
- Albert Hammond, It Never Rains in Southern California (Mums, 1972)
- Gene Harris, Tribute to Count Basie (Concord Jazz, 1988)
- Hampton Hawes, Northern Windows (Prestige, 1974)
- Jim Horn, Through the Eyes of a Horn (Shelter, 1972)
- The Hues Corporation, Not Too Shabby (RCA Victor, 1976)
- The Imperials, One More Song for You (Dayspring, 1979)
- The Imperials, Priority (DaySpring, 1980)
- Jack Jones, What I Did for Love (RCA Victor, 1975)
- Quincy Jones, Quincy's Got a Brand New Bag (Mercury, 1965)
- Kris Kristofferson, Spooky Lady's Sideshow (Monument, 1974)
- James Last, Well Kept Secret (Polydor, 1975)
- Eloise Laws, Eloise (ABC, 1977)
- Joe Liggins, Joe Liggins (Bellaphon, 1979)
- Preston Love, Preston Love (Mexie L 2003)
- Carrie Lucas, Simply Carrie (Soul Train, 1977)
- The Manhattan Transfer, Coming Out (Atlantic, 1976)
- Lee Michaels, 5th (A&M, 1971)
- Liza Minnelli, Tropical Nights (Columbia, 1977)
- The Miracles, Love Crazy (Columbia, 1977)
- Blue Mitchell, The Last Tango Blues (Mainstream, 1973)
- Grover Mitchell, Meet Grover Mitchell (Jazz Chronicles, 1979)
- Ted Neeley, 1974 A. D. (RCA Victor, 1973)
- Oliver Nelson, Skull Session (Flying Dutchman, 1975)
- Wayne Newton, Pour Me a Little More Wine (Chelsea, 1973)
- Nielsen Pearson, Nielsen/Pearson (Capitol, 1980)
- Nigel Olsson, Nigel Olsson (Rocket, 1975)
- Michael Omartian, White Horse (ABC Dunhill, 1974)
- Michael Omartian and Stormie Omartian, The Builder (Myrrh, 1980)
- Shuggie Otis, Here Comes Shuggie Otis (Epic, 1970)
- Shuggie Otis, Inspiration Information (Epic, 1974)
- The Partridge Family, Bulletin Board (Bell, 1973)
- Jim Peterik, Don't Fight the Feeling (Epic, 1976)
- The Plimsouls, The Plimsouls (Planet, 1981)
- Pratt & McClain, Pratt-McClain Dunhill, (ABC, 1974)
- Don Preston, Been Here All the Time (Shelter, 1974)
- John Prine, Common Sense (Atlantic, 1975)
- Gene Redding, Blood Brother (Haven/Capitol, 1974)
- Rhythm Heritage, Disco Derby (MCA, 1979)
- The Righteous Brothers, Give It to the People (Haven/Capitol, 1974)
- D. J. Rogers, The Message Is Still the Same (ARC/Columbia, 1980)
- Lalo Schifrin, Gone with the Wave (Colpix, 1965)
- Neil Sedaka, The Hungry Years (Rocket, 1975)
- Randy Sharp, The First in Line (Nautilus, 1977)
- Side Effect, Side Effect (Fantasy, 1975)
- P. F. Sloan, Raised On (Mums, 1972)
- Tom Snow, Taking It All in Stride (Capitol, 1975)
- Steely Dan, Aja (ABC, 1977)
- Gerald Wilson, Detroit (Mack Avenue, 2009)
- Sarah Vaughan, A Time in My Life (Mainstream, 1971)
- The Ventures, Rock and Roll Forever (United Artists, 1972)
- Zulema, Ms. Z. (Sussex, 1973)
