= Jack Nimitz =

American jazz saxophonist (1930–2009)

Background information
- Born: Jerome Nimitz; January 11, 1930; Washington, D.C.
- Died: June 10, 2009 (aged 79) Los Angeles, California
- Genre: Jazz
- Occupation: Musician
- Instrument: Baritone saxophone
- Years active: 1949–1990s

Jack Nimitz (January 11, 1930 – June 10, 2009) was an American jazz baritone saxophonist, nicknamed "The Admiral" - a reference to Chester Nimitz.

== Career ==
A native of Washington, D.C., Nimitz started on clarinet in his early teens before playing alto saxophone. During the 1950s he played baritone saxophone with Woody Herman, Stan Kenton, and Herbie Mann. He continued to play in big bands in the 1960s with Terry Gibbs and Gerald Wilson in addition to working in film and leading a quintet.

Nimitz was a founding member of Supersax in the early 1970s and remained with the band into the 1990s. During the 1980s and 1990s he was a member of big bands led by Oliver Nelson and Bill Berry. He performed in the sextet of Frank Strazzeri and the sextet of Bud Shank in the 1990s. In 1997 he worked with Buddy Childers at the PizzaExpress Jazz Club in London.

A studio musician for much of his life, Nimitz recorded his first album as leader in the 1990s.

== Death ==
The Jack Nimitz Quintet played its final performance on May 10, 2009, in Northridge, California. Nimitz died in Los Angeles at the age of 79 from complications due to emphysema.

== Discography ==
=== As leader ===
- Live at the Royal Palms Inn Volume 8 with Buddy Childers (Woofy, 1994)
- Confirmation (Fresh Sound, 1995)
- Live at Capozzoli's (Woofy Productions, 1997)

== As sideman ==
With Terry Gibbs

- The Exciting Terry Gibbs Big Band (Verve, 1961)
- Explosion! (Mercury, 1962)
- Flying Home (Volume 3) (Contemporary, 1988)
- The Big Cat (Volume 5) (Contemporary, 1991)

With Woody Herman

- The Woody Herman Band! Part 1 (Capitol, 1954)
- The Woody Herman Band! Part 3 (Capitol, 1954)
- Road Band! (Capitol, 1955)
- The Woody Herman Band! (Capitol, 1955)
- Woody Herman (Metro, 1965)

With Stan Kenton

- Kenton in Hi-Fi (Capitol, 1956)
- Songs for Hip Lovers (Verve, 1957)
- Road Show with June Christy and The Four Freshmen (Capitol, 1959)
- Standards in Silhouette (Verve, 1960)
- Artistry in Bossa Nova (Capitol, 1963)
- Kenton / Wagner (Capitol, 1964)
- Hair (Capitol, 1969)

With Steuart Liebig

- No Train (Cadence, 1997)
- Antipodes (Cadence, 2000)

With Shelly Manne

- My Fair Lady with the Un-original Cast (Capitol, 1964)
- Manne–That's Gershwin! (Capitol, 1965)

With Mark Murphy

- Playing the Field (Capitol, 1960)

With Oliver Nelson

- Sound Pieces (Impulse!, 1966)
- Live from Los Angeles (Impulse!, 1967)
- Stolen Moments (East Wind, 1975)

With Lalo Schifrin

- Music from Mission: Impossible (Dot, 1967)
- Mannix (Paramount, 1968)
- Bullitt (Warner Bros., 1968)

With Diane Schuur

- Timeless (GRP, 1986)
- Pure Schuur (GRP, 1991)
- In Tribute (GRP, 1992)

With Bud Shank

- Bud Shank & the Sax Section (Pacific Jazz, 1966)
- New Gold! (Candid, 1994)
- Plays Harold Arlen (Jimco, 1995)

With Supersax

- Supersax Plays Bird (Capitol, 1973)
- Salt Peanuts Supersax Plays Bird, Volume 2 (Capitol, 1974)
- Supersax Plays Bird with Strings (Capitol, 1975)
- Chasin' the Bird (MPS, 1977)
- Dynamite !! (MPS, 1979)
- Supersax & L.A. Voices Volume 2 (CBS, 1984)
- Stone Bird (Columbia, 1988)

With Gerald Wilson

- You Better Believe It! (Pacific Jazz, 1961)
- Moment of Truth (Pacific Jazz, 1962)
- Portraits (Pacific Jazz, 1964)
- On Stage (Pacific Jazz, 1965)
- Feelin' Kinda Blues (Pacific Jazz, 1965)
- The Golden Sword (Pacific Jazz, 1966)
- Lomelin (Discovery, 1981)
- Jessica (Trend, 1983)
- State Street Sweet (MAMA, 1995)
- Theme for Monterey (MAMA, 1997)

With others

- Gene Ammons, Free Again (Prestige, 1971)
- Paul Anka, The Music Man (United Artists, 1977)
- Gabe Baltazar, Stan Kenton Presents Gabe Baltazar (Creative World, 1979)
- The Beach Boys, 15 Big Ones (Reprise, 1976)
- Max Bennett, Max Bennett Vol. II (Bethlehem, 1957)
- Bill Berry, Hot & Happy (Beez Beez 1974)
- Bill Berry, Hello Rev (Concord Jazz, 1976)
- Ralph Burns, In the Mood (Atlantic, 1987)
- Kenny Burrell, Both Feet on the Ground (Fantasy, 1973)
- Frank Capp, In a Hefti Bag (Concord Jazz, 1995)
- Captain & Tennille, Song of Joy (A&M, 1976)
- June Christy, Bob Cooper, Do-Re-Mi (Capitol, 1961)
- June Christy, Big Band Specials (Capitol, 1962)
- Stanley Clarke, School Days (Nemperor, 1976)
- Nat King Cole, L-O-V-E (Capitol, 1965)
- Natalie Cole, Unforgettable with Love (Elektra, 1991)
- Dick Collins, Horn of Plenty (RCA, 1955)
- Dick Collins, King Richard the Swing Hearted (RCA Victor, 1955)
- Judy Collins, Hard Times for Lovers (Elektra, 1979)
- Willis Conover, House of Sounds (Brunswick, 1954)
- Ron Davies, U. F. O. (A&M, 1973)
- Neil Diamond, Beautiful Noise (Columbia, 1976)
- João Donato, A Bad Donato (Blue Thumb, 1970)
- Cass Elliot, Cass Elliot (RCA Victor, 1972)
- Michael Feinstein, Isn't It Romantic (Elektra, 1988)
- Michael Feinstein, Forever (Elektra, 1993)
- Allyn Ferguson, Pictures at an Exhibition (Framed in Jazz Aeva 1963)
- Clare Fischer, Extension (Pacific Jazz, 1963)
- Clare Fischer, Whose Woods Are These? (Discovery, 1984)
- Clare Fischer, Blues Trilogy (Discovery, 1987)
- Gil Fuller, Gil Fuller & the Monterey Jazz Festival Orchestra featuring Dizzy Gillespie (Pacific Jazz, 1965)
- Urbie Green & Nat Pierce, Old Time Modern (Vanguard, 1973)
- Johnny "Hammond" Smith, Forever Taurus (Milestone, 1976)
- Herbie Hancock, Sunlight (Columbia, 1978)
- Gene Harris, Tribute to Count Basie (Concord Jazz, 1988)
- Johnny Hartman, Unforgettable (Impulse!, 1995)
- Bill Holman, Bill Holman's Great Big Band (Capitol, 1960)
- Richard Holmes, Six Million Dollar Man, (RCA/Flying Dutchman, 1975)
- Shirley Horn, Shirley Horn with Strings Here's to Life (Verve, 1992)
- Milt Jackson, The Impulse Years (ABC/Impulse!, 1974)
- Milt Jackson, Bags' Groove (Quintessence Jazz Series 1979)
- Quincy Jones, This Is How I Feel About Jazz (ABC-Paramount, 1957)
- Quincy Jones, The Color Purple (Qwest, 1986)
- Quincy Jones, Q's Jook Joint (Qwest/Warner Bros., 1995)
- Earl Klugh, Finger Paintings (Blue Note, 1977)
- Peggy Lee, Mirrors (A&M, 1975)
- Vic Lewis, Presents a Celebration of Contemporary West Coast Jazz (Candid, 1994)
- Jon Lucien, Premonition (Columbia, 1976)
- Harvey Mandel, Righteous (Philips, 1969)
- Johnny Mandel, The Jazz Soul of Porgy and Bess (NEC Avenue 1990)
- Herbie Mann, Sultry Serenade (Riverside, 1958)
- Herbie Mann, Let Me Tell You (Milestone, 1973)
- Teena Marie, Emerald City (Epic, 1986)
- Letta Mbulu, There's Music in the Air (A&M, 1977)
- Les McCann, Les McCann Sings (Pacific Jazz, 1961)
- Les McCann, Oh Brother! (Fontana, 1964)
- Jimmy McCracklin, The Stinger Man (Minit, 1969)
- Carmen McRae, Can't Hide Love (Blue Note, 1976)
- Don Menza, Burnin' (M&K Realtime, 1981)
- Charles Mingus, Mingus at Monterey (Jazz Workshop, 1965)
- Sammy Nestico, Dark Orchid (Dark Orchid, 1981)
- Sammy Nestico, Night Flight (Sea Breeze, 1986)
- Anita O'Day, Anita O'Day Swings Cole Porter with Billy May (Verve, 1991)
- Charlie Parker, One Night in Washington (Elektra, Musician, 1982)
- Bill Perkins, On Stage (Pacific Jazz, 1956)
- Bill Perkins, Our Man Woody (Jazz Mark, 1991)
- Nat Pierce, Dick Collins, Charlie Mariano, The Nat Pierce-Dick Collins Nonet/the Charlie Mariano Sextet (Fantasy, 1956)
- Prince, Parade (Paisley Park, 1986)
- Boots Randolph, Boots with Brass (Monument, 1970)
- Helen Reddy, Music, Music (Capitol, 1976)
- Rockie Robbins, You and Me (A&M, 1980)
- Diana Ross, Lady Sings the Blues (Motown, 1972)
- Horace Silver, Silver 'N Wood (Blue Note, 1976)
- Frank Sinatra, Duets (Capitol, 1993)
- The Singers Unlimited, Feeling Free (Pausa, 1980)
- O.C. Smith, Together (Caribou, 1977)
- Frank Strazzeri, Somebody Loves Me (Fresh Sound, 1994)
- Toni Tennille, More Than You Know (Mirage, 1984)
- Frankie Valli, Valli (Private Stock 1976)
- Joe Williams, In Good Company (Verve, 1989)
