= Lewis Nash =

American jazz drummer

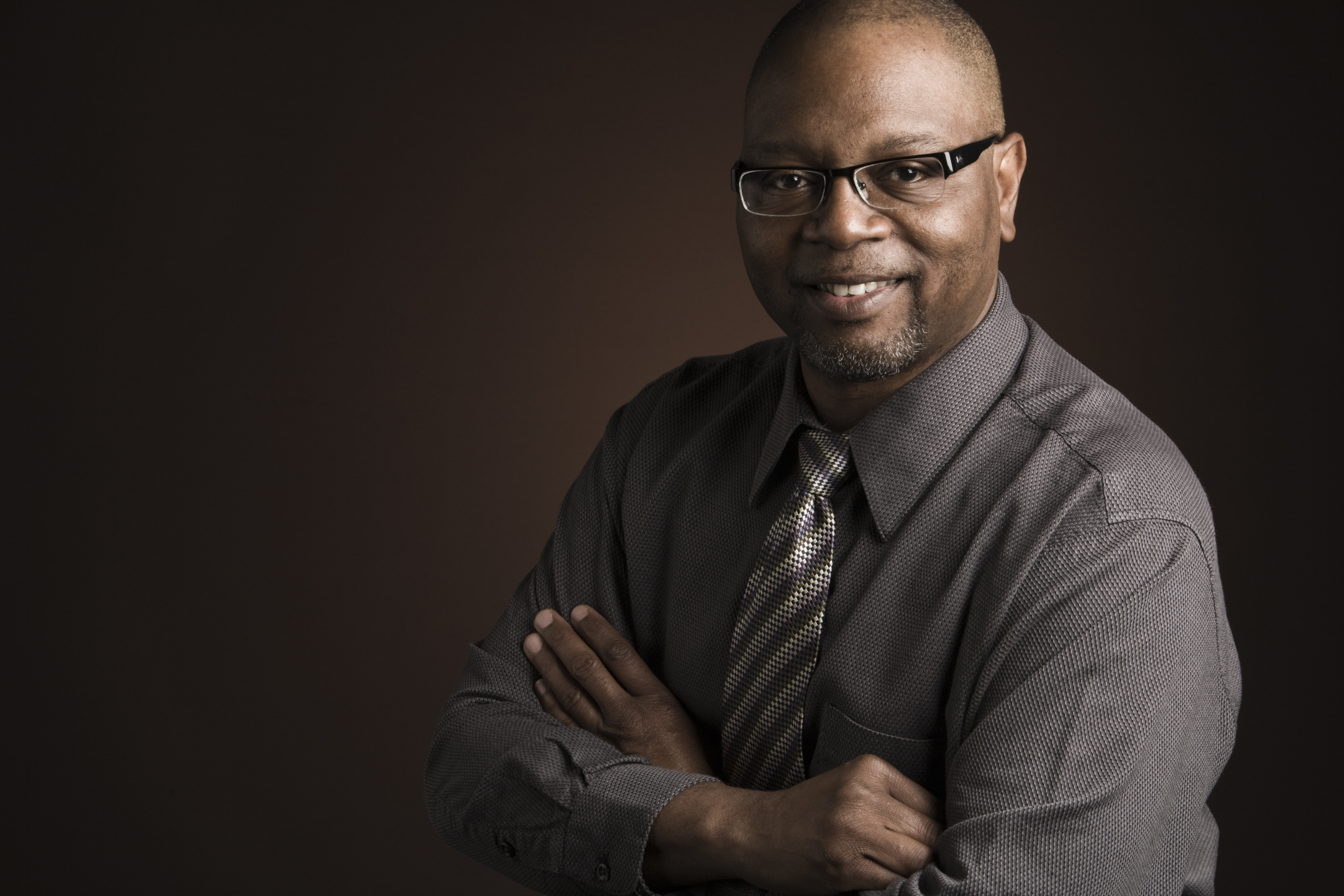
- Nash in 2014

Background information
- Born: December 30, 1958 (age 67); Phoenix, Arizona
- Genres: Jazz
- Occupation: Musician
- Instrument: Drums
- Years active: 1982–present
- Website: www.lewisnashmusic.com

Lewis Nash (born December 30, 1958) is an American jazz drummer. According to Modern Drummer magazine, Nash has one of the longest discographies in jazz and has played on over 400 records, earning him the honor of Jazz's Most Valuable Player by the magazine in its May 2009 issue.

In 2012, The Nash Jazz Club,] opened in Phoenix, AZ. Named after Lewis Nash by Jazz in AZ 501(c)(3), The Nash Jazz Club is dedicated to performances and educational programs that promote jazz education.

In 2017, Nash joined the jazz studies faculty at Arizona State University, where he was named the Bob and Gretchen Ravenscroft Professor of Practice in Jazz. In early 2021, the Lewis Nash Scholarship Endowment was created by the university to be awarded annually to a deserving ASU undergraduate or graduate jazz performance student.

Nash is noted for his adaptability to a vast array of genres, as evidenced by his performances with such different musicians as Tommy Flanagan and Don Pullen. Nash has made 5 recordings as bandleader: Rhythm is My Business (1989), It Don't Mean a Thing (2003 Japanese import) and Stompin' at the Savoy (2005 Japanese import), Lewis Nash and the Bebop All-Stars featuring Frank Wess (2008 Japanese Import), and The Highest Mountain (2012). In 2008, Nash became part of The Blue Note 7, a septet formed that year in honor of the 70th anniversary of Blue Note Records.

== Discography ==
=== As leader ===
- Rhythm Is My Business (Evidence, 1989)
- It Don't Mean a Thing (Pony Canyon, 2003) Japanese import
- Stompin' at the Savoy (Pony Canyon, 2005) Japanese import
- The Highest Mountain (Cellar Live/Planetworks, 2012)
- Duologue with Steve Wilson (MCG Jazz, 2014)

=== As a member ===
- The Blue Note 7, Mosaic: A Celebration of Blue Note Records (Blue Note/EMI, 2009)

=== As sideman ===
With Toshiko Akiyoshi

- Four Seasons (1990)
- Remembering Bud: Cleopatra's Dream (1990)
- Chic Lady (1991)
- Hope (2005)

With Ron Carter

- Eight Plus (Victor (Japan), 1990)
- Mr. Bow-tie (Somethin' Else, 1995)
- The Bass and I (Somethin' Else, 1997)
- So What? (Somethin' Else, 1998)

With Classical Jazz Quartet

- Tchaikovsky's Nutcracker (Vertical, 2001)
- The Classical Jazz Quartet Plays Bach (Vertical, 2002)
- The Classical Jazz Quartet Play Rachmaninov (Kind of Blue, 2006)
- The Classical Jazz Quartet Play Tchaikovsky (Vertical, 2006)
- Christmas (Kind of Blue, 2006)

With Tommy Flanagan

- Beyond the Blue Bird (Timeless, 1990)
- Flanagan's Shenanigans (Storyville, 1993)
- Let's Play the Music of Thad Jones (Enja, 1993)
- Lady Be Good ... For Ella (Groovin' High, 1993)
- Sea Changes (Alfa, 1996)
- Sunset and the Mockingbird (Blue Note, 1997)

With Don Friedman

- Waltz for Debby (Eighty-Eight's, 2003)
- My Favorite Things (Eighty-Eight's, 2004)
- Circle Waltz 21C (Eighty-Eight's, 2010)

With Dizzy Gillespie

- Bird Songs: The Final Recordings (Telarc, 1992)
- To Bird with Love (Telarc, 1992)

With Joe Lovano

- Tenor Legacy (Blue Note, 1993)
- Quartets: Live at the Village Vanguard (Blue Note, 1995)
- 52nd Street Themes (Blue Note, 2000)
- Classic! Live at Newport (Blue Note, 2016)

With Houston Person

- Mellow (HighNote, 2009)
- So Nice (HighNote, 2011)
- Naturally (HighNote, 2012)
- Nice 'n' Easy (HighNote, 2013)
- The Melody Lingers On (HighNote, 2014)
- Something Personal (HighNote, 2015)

With Gerald Wilson

- New York, New Sound (Mack Avenue, 2003)
- In My Time (Mack Avenue, 2005)
- Monterey Moods (Mack Avenue, 2007)
- Detroit (Mack Avenue, 2009)
- Legacy (Mack Avenue, 2011)

With others

- Kenny Barron, Invitation (Criss Cross Jazz, 1991)
- Kenny Burrell, Sunup to Sundown (Contemporary, 1991)
- Benny Carter, Legends (MusicMasters, 1993)
- Roni Ben-Hur, Fortuna (2008)
- Frank Foster, Leo Rising (Arabesque, 1997)
- Sir Roland Hanna, Milano, Paris, New York: Finding John Lewis (Venus, 2002)
- Jimmy Heath, Little Man Big Band (Verve, 1992)
- Eddie Henderson, Inspiration (Milestone, 1994)
- Branford Marsalis, Random Abstract (Columbia, 1987)
- Pat Martino, Think Tank (Blue Note, 2003)
- Charles McPherson, Come Play with Me (Arabesque, 1995)
- Mulgrew Miller, Hand in Hand (1992)
- Tete Montoliu, The Man from Barcelona (Timeless, 1990)
- Frank Morgan, A Lovesome Thing (Antilles, 1991)
- David "Fathead" Newman, Mr. Gentle Mr. Cool (Kokopelli, 1994)
- Chris Potter,Presenting Chris Potter (Criss Cross Jazz, 1993)
- Don Pullen, Random Thoughts (Blue Note, 1990)
- Renee Rosnes, Black Narcissus (M&I Music, 2009)
- Clark Terry, Portraits with Don Friedman, Victor Gaskin (1989)
- Toots Thielemans, Footprints (EmArcy, 1989)
- McCoy Tyner, Illuminations (Telarc, 2004)
- Cedar Walton, Roots (Astor Place, 1997)
- Larry Willis, How Do You Keep the Music Playing? (SteepleChase, 1992)
- Saori Yano, Little Tiny (Nippon Columbia, 2007)
- Dee Dee Bridgewater, Eleanora Fagan (1915–1959): To Billie with Love from Dee Dee Bridgewater (EmArcy, 2010)
- Jane Monheit, Taking a Chance on Love (Sony Music Entertainment, 2004)
