= Hadley Caliman =

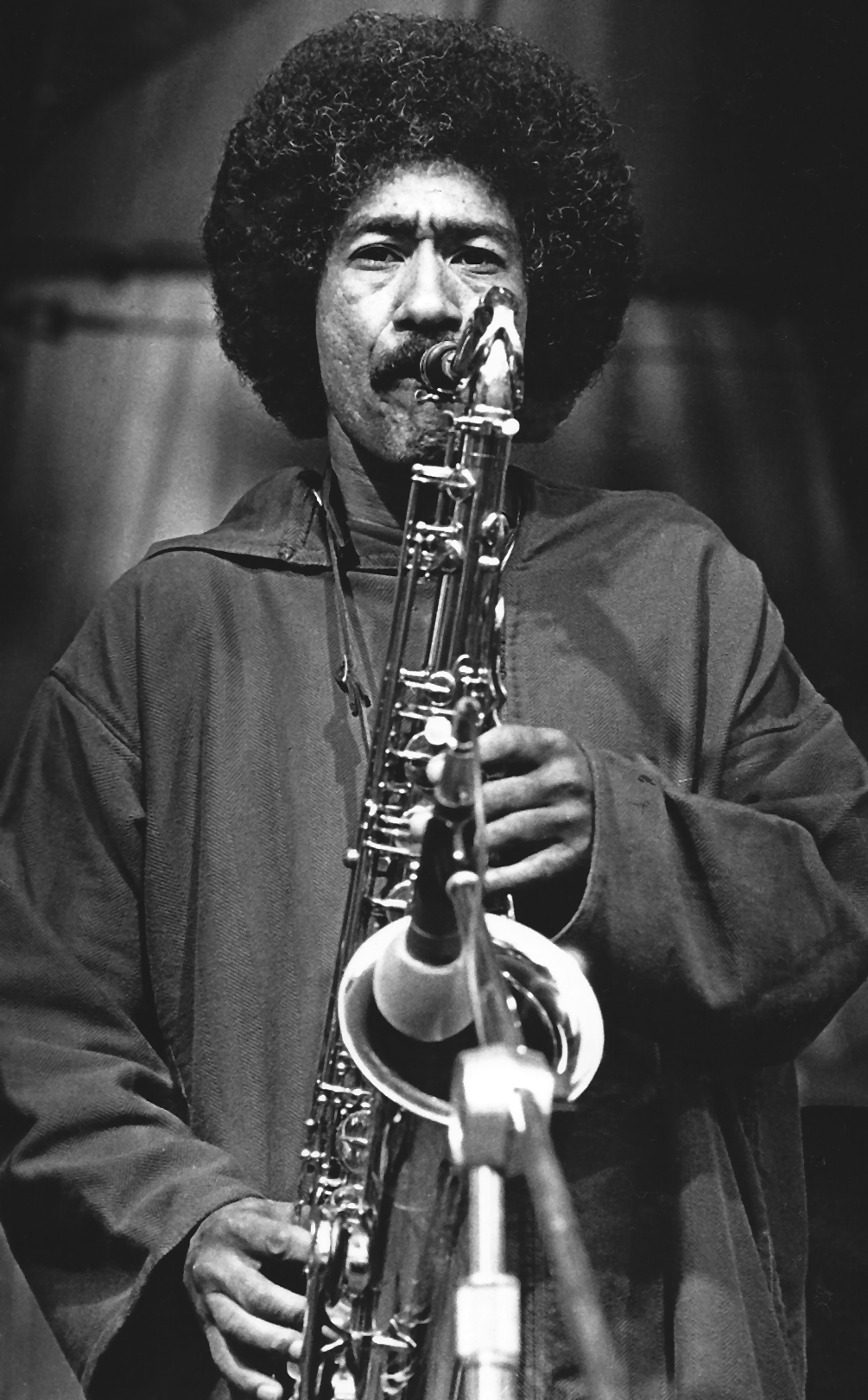
- Caliman in 1978

Background information
- Born: January 12, 1932; Idabel, Oklahoma, U.S.
- Died: September 8, 2010 (aged 78) Seattle, Washington, U.S.
- Genres: Jazz
- Occupation: Musician
- Instruments: Saxophone, flute

Hadley Caliman (January 12, 1932 – September 8, 2010) was an American jazz saxophone and flute player.

== Career ==
Raised by his mother in rural Idabel, Oklahoma until the age of ten, he moved to Los Angeles with his father and studied at Jefferson High School, the same school as saxophonist Dexter Gordon. One of his teachers was trumpeter Art Farmer. He worked with Earl Hines, Carlos Santana, the Grateful Dead, Joe Henderson, Freddie Hubbard, Jon Hendricks, Earl Anderza, In the late 1960s, he was a member of a jazz-rock fusion group led by Ray Draper.

He recorded his first solo album in 1971 before moving to Cathlamet, Washington with his third wife to raise a family. Throughout the 1990s and 2000s, he led quartet and quintet in Seattle. He was on the music faculty at Cornish College of the Arts until his retirement in 2003 and taught private lessons to area musicians. He moved to Seattle, where he lived with his fourth wife and recorded three solo albums after being diagnosed with liver cancer in 2008. He died in September 2010 at the age of 78.

== Discography ==
=== As leader ===
- Hadley Caliman (Mainstream, 1971)
- Iapetus (Mainstream, 1972)
- Projecting (Catalyst, 1976)
- Celebration (Catalyst, 1977)
- Gratitude (Origin, 2008)
- Straight Ahead (Origin, 2010)
- Reunion with Pete Christlieb (Origin, 2010)

=== As sideman ===
With Gerald Wilson

- Live and Swinging (Pacific Jazz, 1967)
- Everywhere (Pacific Jazz, 1968)
- California Soul (Pacific Jazz, 1968)
- Eternal Equinox (World Pacific, 1969)

With others

- Johnny Almond, Hollywood Blues (Deram, 1969)
- Jose Areas, Jose "Chepito" Areas (Columbia, 1974)
- Bobby Bryant, Ain't Doing Too Bad (Cadet, 1967)
- Todd Cochran, Worlds Around the Sun (Prestige, 1972)
- Don Ellis, The New Don Ellis Band Goes Underground (Columbia, 1969)
- Johnny Hammond, Gears (Milestone, 1975)
- Johnny Hammond, Don't Let the System Get You (Milestone, 1978)
- Hampton Hawes, Blues for Walls (Prestige, 1973)
- Eddie Henderson, Heritage (Blue Note, 1976)
- Joe Henderson, Canyon Lady (Milestone, 1975)
- Joe Henderson, Black Miracle (Milestone, 1976)
- Jon Hendricks, Tell Me the Truth (Arista, 1975)
- Freddie Hubbard, Skagly (CBS, 1980)
- Freddie Hubbard, Pinnacle (Resonance, 2011)
- Bobby Hutcherson, Waiting (Blue Note, 1976)
- Bobby Hutcherson, Knucklebean (Blue Note, 1977)
- The Keynotes, Get On That Gospel Train (MPS/BASF 1973)
- Azar Lawrence, Bridge into the New Age (Prestige, 1974)
- Prince Lasha, Firebirds Live at Berkeley Jazz Festival Vol I (Birdseye, 1976)
- Malo, Dos (Warner Bros., 1972)
- Phil Moore, Afro Brazil Oba! (Tower, 1967)
- Julian Priester, Love, Love (ECM, 1974)
- Flora Purim, Stories to Tell (Milestone, 1974)
- Della Reese, One More Time! Recorded Live at the Playboy Club (ABC, 1966)
- Patrice Rushen, Prelusion (Prestige, 1974)
- Patrice Rushen, Before the Dawn (Prestige, 1975)
- Mongo Santamaria, Stone Soul (Columbia, 1969)
- Mongo Santamaria, Afro American Latin (SME, 2000)
- Carlos Santana & Buddy Miles, Carlos Santana & Buddy Miles! Live! (Columbia, 1972)
- Santana, Caravanserai (CBS/Sony 1972)
- Bola Sete, Shebaba (Fantasy, 1971)
- Phoebe Snow, It Looks Like Snow (Columbia, 1976)
- Bill Summers, Cayenne (Prestige, 1977)
- Bill Summers, Feel the Heat (Prestige, 1977)
- Leon Thomas, A Piece of Cake (Palcoscenico, 1980)
- Maxine Weldon, Chilly Wind (Mainstream, 1971)
- Jessica Williams, Joy (Jazz Focus, 1996)

== See also ==
- Notable residents of Idabel, Oklahoma
