= Anthony Wilson (musician) =

American jazz guitarist, arranger and composer

- Born: Anthony Jay Wilson; May 9, 1968; Los Angeles, California, U.S.
- Genres: Jazz
- Occupations: Musician, composer, arranger
- Instrument: Guitar
- Labels: MAMA, Summit, Groove Note
- Website: www.anthonywilsonmusic.com

Anthony Wilson (born May 9, 1968) is an American jazz guitarist, arranger and composer. He is the son of bandleader Gerald Wilson.

== Education and career ==
Born in Los Angeles on May 9, 1968, Wilson received his degree in music composition from Bennington College. He counts Duke Ellington, Gil Evans, Wes Montgomery, Ry Cooder, and T-Bone Walker among his influences. His first album Anthony Wilson was nominated for a Grammy Award and his second album, Goat Hill Junket (1998) also received praise. Albums with his nine-piece band include Adult Themes (MAMA, 1999) and Power of Nine (Groove Note, 2006). Diana Krall and mandolinist Eva Scow appear on the latter.

He has also recorded two trio albums with Hammond organist Joe Bagg and drummer Mark Ferber, Our Gang in 2001 and Savivity in 2005 (both on Groove Note). In 2009 he recorded more organ trio music with Jack of Hearts (again for Groove Note) featuring Larry Goldings on Hammond organ, and alternating drummers Jim Keltner and Jeff Hamilton.

As a composer, he has received commissions from the International Association for Jazz Education, the Henry Mancini Institute, Jazz at Lincoln Center, the Los Angeles Philharmonic Association, luthier John Monteleone, and the Jazz Coalition Commission Fund. His guitar quartet song cycle "Seasons" was composed as a vehicle for Monteleone's quartet of guitars called "The Four Seasons" which were included in the Metropolitan Museum of Art's 2011 exhibition "Guitar Heroes." "Seasons" was released as an audio CD and live performance film DVD set on Wilson's label Goat Hill Recordings in November 2011. Another 2011 album, recorded in Brazil, was Campo Belo (Goat Hill), featuring rising Brazilian music stars André Mehmari (piano and accordion), Edu Ribeiro (drums), and Guto Wirtti (bass).

Wilson arranged and orchestrated Ivan Lins' song "Love Dance" for Barbra Streisand, on her 2009 album Love Is the Answer, produced by Diana Krall. Wilson also played guitar on that album.

Wilson can be heard on recordings by Paul McCartney (Kisses on the Bottom, Concord), Willie Nelson (American Standard, Blue Note), Leon Russell (Life Journey, Universal), Aaron Neville (Nature Boy: The Standards Album, Verve), Al Jarreau (Accentuate the Positive, Verve), Mose Allison (The Way of the World, Anti-), Joe Henry (Fuse, Mammoth), Diane Schuur (Midnight, Concord), Gladys Knight (Before Me, Verve), Kenny Burrell (75th Birthday Bash Live!, Blue Note), Randy Crawford and Joe Sample (No Regrets, PRA), Bobby Hutcherson (Wise One, Kind of Blue), Till Brönner (The Good Life, Verve).

He has been a member of Diana Krall's group since 2001, appearing on albums and DVDs, notably the Grammy-winning Live in Paris.

He recorded the album Nova with Brazilian guitarist Chico Pinheiro which was released in Brazil on Pinheiro's label Buriti and in the US on Wilson's label Goat Hill Recordings.

Wilson can also be heard on a number of his father Gerald Wilson's recordings. Since 1986, he has held the guitar chair with the Gerald Wilson Orchestra. Since his father's death in 2014, Wilson has continued the leadership of the Gerald Wilson Orchestra in performances at the SOKA Jazz Festival (2014) and the Playboy Jazz Festival (2015).

Wilson's main guitar is a custom "Radio Flyer" archtop built by luthier John Monteleone; he has also been seen on videos such as "Live in Paris" playing a blond 1958 Gibson Byrdland. Other frequently played guitars include a 1968 Gibson Les Paul Deluxe, and a 1934 Gibson L-30, and a Fender American Vintage series Telecaster with pickups made by Ron Ellis.

== Discography ==
- Anthony Wilson (Mama, 1997)
- Goat Hill Junket (Mama, 1998)
- Adult Themes (Mama, 1999)
- Our Gang (Groove Note, 2001)
- Savivity (Groove Note, 2005)
- Power of Nine (Groove Note, 2006)
- Nova with Chico Pinheiro (Goat Hill, 2007)
- Jack of Hearts (Groove Note, 2009)
- Campo Belo (Goat Hill, 2010)
- Seasons: Live at the Metropolitan Museum of Art (Goat Hill, 2011)
- Frogtown (Goat Hill, 2016)
- Songs and Photographs (Goat Hill, 2018)
- The Plan of Paris (Goat Hill, 2022)
- Hackensack West (Cohearant, 2024)

With Jacintha

- Autumn Leaves (Groove Note, 1999)
- Lush Life (Groove Note, 2001)
- Love Flows Like a River (Harmony, 2005)
- Jacintha Goes to Hollywood (Groove Note, 2007)

With Diana Krall

- Live in Paris (Verve, 2002)
- The Girl in the Other Room (Verve, 2004)
- Live at the Montreal Jazz Festival (Verve, 2004)
- Christmas Songs (Verve, 2005)
- From This Moment On (Verve, 2006)
- Quiet Nights (Verve, 2009)
- Turn Up the Quiet (Verve, 2017)
- This Dream of You (Verve, 2020)

With Gerald Wilson

- Calafia (Trend, 1985)
- Jenna (Discovery, 1989)
- State Street Sweet (MAMA/Summit, 1995)
- Theme for Monterey (MAMA/Summit, 1998)
- New York, New Sound (Mack Avenue, 2003)
- Monterey Moods (Mack Avenue, 2007)
- Detroit (Mack Avenue, 2009)
- Legacy (Mack Avenue, 2011)

With others

- Mose Allison, The Way of the World (Anti-, 2010)
- Herb Alpert, The Christmas Wish (Herb Alpert Presents, 2017)
- Eden Atwood, Waves (Groove Note, 2002)
- Chris Botti, To Love Again (Columbia, 2005)
- Chris Botti, December (Columbia, 2006)
- Till Bronner, The Good Life (Masterworks, 2016)
- Michael Buble, It's Time (143/Reprise, 2005)
- Kenny Burrell, 75th Birthday Bash Live! (Blue Note, 2007)
- Terri Lyne Carrington, More to Say (E1, 2009)
- Pete Christlieb, For Heaven's Sake (CARS, 1999)
- Randy Crawford, Feeling Good (EmArcy, 2006)
- Randy Crawford, No Regrets (PRA/EmArcy, 2008)
- Lorraine Feather, Cafe Society (Sanctuary, 2003)
- Melody Gardot, Sunset in the Blue (Verve, 2020)
- Richard Galliano, Sentimentale (Resonance, 2014)
- Joe Henry, Fuse (Mammoth/Edel, 1999)
- Bobby Hutcherson, Wise One (Kind of Blue, 2009)
- Al Jarreau, Accentuate the Positive (Verve, 2004)
- Norah Jones, ...Featuring (Blue Note, 2010)
- Gladys Knight, Before Me (Verve, 2006)
- Charles Lloyd, Ocean (Blue Note, 2022)
- Paul McCartney, Kisses on the Bottom (Hear Music/MPL, 2012)
- Miranda Sex Garden, Suspiria (Mute, 1993)
- Gaby Moreno & Van Dyke Parks, Spangled! (Nonesuch, 2019)
- Josh Nelson, Let It Go (Omagatoki, 2007)
- Josh Nelson, The Sky Remains (Origin, 2017)
- Willie Nelson, American Classic (Blue Note, 2009)
- Aaron Neville, Nature Boy (Verve, 2003)
- Vanessa Paradis, Live (Remark, 1994)
- Dave Pike, Bophead (Ubiquity, 1998)
- Leon Russell, Life Journey (Universal, 2014)
- Diane Schuur, Midnight (Concord, 2003)
- Kandace Springs, Indigo (Blue Note, 2018)
- Curtis Stigers, Baby Plays Around (Concord, 2001)
- Curtis Stigers, Secret Heart (Concord, 2002)
- Donald Vega, With Respect to Monty (Resonance, 2015)
