= State Street Sweet =

Studio album by Gerald Wilson Orchestra
- Released: 1995
- Recorded: 1994
- Genre: Jazz
- Length: 56:25
- Label: MAMA; MMF 1010
- Producer: Douglas Evans and Gerald Wilson

Gerald Wilson chronology
Jenna (1989)	State Street Sweet (1995)	Theme for Monterey (1997)

State Street Sweet is an album by the Gerald Wilson Orchestra recorded in 1994 and released on the MAMA label.

== Reception ==
Professional ratings
Review scores
Source	Rating
AllMusic	4.5/5 stars
The Penguin Guide to Jazz Recordings	3.5/4 stars

AllMusic rated the album with 4½ stars; in his review, Scott Yanow noted: "this edition of the Gerald Wilson Orchestra is quite strong but it is the leader's colorful and distinctive arrangements that give the band its personality. Recommended".

== Track listing ==
All compositions by Gerald Wilson except where noted.

1. "State Street Sweet" - 2:46
2. "Lake Shore Drive" - 6:04
3. "Lighthouse Blues" - 7:48
4. "Come Back to Sorrento" (Ernesto De Curtis) - 5:19
5. "The Serpent" - 4:03
6. "The Feather" - 5:54
7. "Caprichos" - 6:28
8. "Jammin' in C" - 8:47
9. "Carlos" - 6:35
10. "Nancy Jo" - 2:21

== Personnel ==
- Gerald Wilson - arranger, conductor
- Ron Barrows (track 9), Bob Clark (tracks 3, 4 & 6–9), George Graham (tracks 1–5 & 10), Tony Lujan (tracks: 1, 2 & 5–10), Bobby Shew (tracks 3 & 6–9), Frank Szabo (tracks 1–5 & 10), Snooky Young -trumpet
- Thurman Green (tracks 1–5 & 10), Alex Iles (tracks 6–9), Charlie Loper, Ira Nepus - trombone
- Maurice Spears - bass trombone
- John Stephens, Randall Willis - alto saxophone
- Plas Johnson (track 4), Carl Randall, Louis Taylor - tenor saxophone
- Jack Nimitz - baritone saxophone
- Brian O'Rourke - piano
- Eric Otis (tracks 3 & 7), Anthony Wilson - guitar
- Trey Henry - bass
- Mel Lee - drums
