= California Soul (album) =

Studio album by Gerald Wilson Orchestra
- Released: 1968
- Recorded: August 7 & 16 and September 2, 1968
- Studio: Liberty Studios, Hollywood, CA
- Genre: Jazz
- Label: Pacific Jazz; ST 20135
- Producer: Richard Bock

Gerald Wilson chronology
Everywhere (1968)	California Soul (1968)	Eternal Equinox (1968)

California Soul is an album by the Gerald Wilson Orchestra recorded in 1968 and released on the Pacific Jazz label.

== Reception ==
Professional ratings
Review scores
Source	Rating
AllMusic	2/5 stars

AllMusic gave the album a rating of 2 stars. In his review, Scott Yanow criticized the album, stating that it was one of Gerald Wilson's weakest releases on Pacific Jazz, primarily due to the commercial material."

== Track listing ==
All compositions by Gerald Wilson except as indicated

1. "California Soul" (Nickolas Ashford, Valerie Simpson) - 4:06
2. "Light My Fire" (The Doors) - 5:00
3. "Channel Island" - 5:05
4. "Lullaby from Rosemary's Baby" (Krzysztof Komeda) - 2:47
5. "Sunshine of Your Love" (Eric Clapton, Jack Bruce, Pete Brown) - 2:49
6. "Russian River" - 5:20
7. "Yesterlove" (Al Cleveland, Smokey Robinson) - 3:57
8. "Down Here on the Ground" (Gale Garnett, Lalo Schifrin) - 4:45
9. "El Presidente" - 4:10
- Recorded at Liberty Studios in Hollywood, CA on August 7, 1968 (tracks 3 & 9), August 16, 1968 (tracks 1, 4 & 7) and September 2, 1968 (tracks 2, 5, 6 & 8).

== Personnel ==
- Gerald Wilson - arranger, conductor
- Bobby Bryant (tracks 2, 5, 6 & 8), Larry McGuire (tracks 2, 3, 5, 6, 8 & 9), Ollie Mitchell (tracks 1, 4 & 7), Alex Rodriguez (tracks 2, 3, 5, 6, 8 & 9), Tony Rusch (tracks 2, 3, 5, 6, 8 & 9), Dalton Smith (tracks 1, 4 & 7) - trumpet
- Thurman Green, Lester Robertson, Frank Strong - trombone
- Mike Wimberly - bass trombone
- Art Maebe - French horn, tuba (tracks 3 & 9)
- David Duke (tracks 2, 5, 6 & 8), George Hyde (tracks 1, 4 & 7), Jim McGee (tracks 1, 4 & 7) - French horn
- Ramon Bojorquez, Henry DeVega - alto saxophone
- Anthony Ortega - alto saxophone, flute, piccolo
- Hadley Caliman, Harold Land - tenor saxophone
- Bill Perkins - tenor saxophone, flute (tracks 1, 4 & 7)
- Richard Aplanalp - baritone saxophone
- Alan Beutler - alto saxophone, baritone saxophone (tracks 2, 3, 5, 6, 8 & 9)
- William Green - flute, piccolo (tracks 2, 3, 5, 6, 8 & 9)
- Pete Terry - bass clarinet, bassoon
- Bobby Hutcherson - vibraphone
- Tommy Flanagan (tracks 3 & 9), Jimmy Rowles, Mike Wofford (tracks 1, 4 & 7) - piano, organ, electric harpsichord
- Mike Anthony - guitar
- Stanley Gilbert - double bass (tracks 2, 3, 5, 6, 8 & 9)
- Wilton Felder - electric bass
- Carl Lott - drums
- Hugh Anderson, Joe Porcaro - percussion
