= Snooky Young =

American jazz trumpeter (1919–2011)

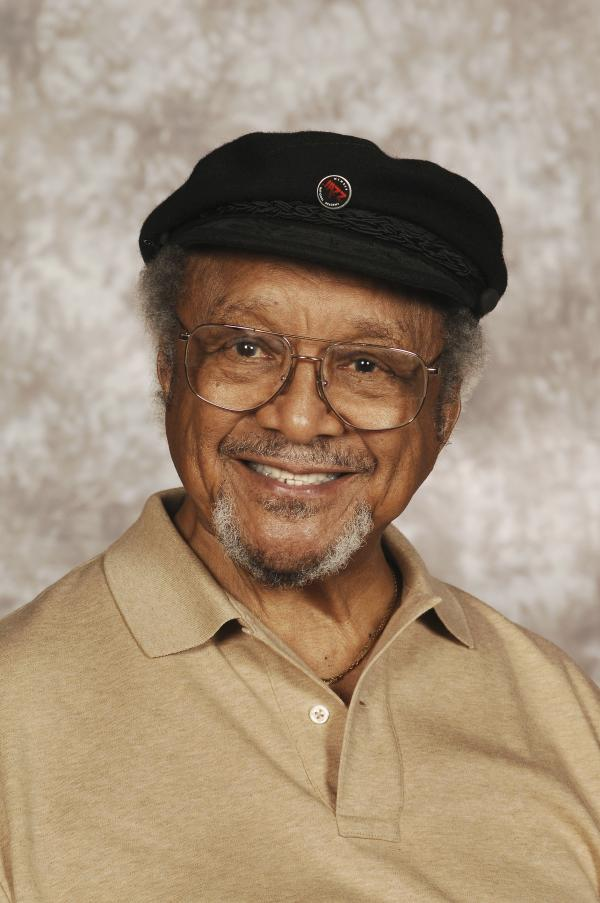

Background information
- Born: February 3, 1919; Dayton, Ohio, U.S.
- Died: May 11, 2011 (aged 92) Newport Beach, California, U.S.
- Genres: Jazz
- Instruments: Trumpet; flugelhorn
- Labels: Master Jazz; Concord Jazz
- Formerly of: Clayton-Hamilton Jazz Orchestra; Thad Jones/Mel Lewis Big Band; B. B. King; Jimmie Lunceford Orchestra; The Tonight Show Band; The Count Basie Orchestra

Eugene Edward "Snooky" Young (February 3, 1919 – May 11, 2011) was an American jazz trumpeter. He was known for his mastery of the plunger mute, with which he was able to create a wide range of sounds.

== Biography ==
Young was lead trumpeter of the Jimmie Lunceford band from 1939 to 1942. He played with Count Basie (three stints totalling eight years), Gerald Wilson and Lionel Hampton, among others, and was an original member of the Thad Jones/Mel Lewis Big Band.

His longest engagement was with NBC, where, as a studio trumpeter, he joined The Tonight Show Band in 1967 and remained with them until 1992, when the band was replaced by a new, smaller group.

He was part of the touring ensemble, the "Now Generation Brass", that traveled with Doc Severinsen, which included other jazz greats such as reed man Lew Tabackin, drummer Ed Shaughnessy, and saxophonist and arranger Tommy Newsom, as well as singer Robert Ozn. Young went on to performing live concert dates, corporate events, and headlining shows in the main rooms of Las Vegas. The one-nighters usually occurred on Fridays, Saturdays, or Sundays, as Severinsen was committed to The Tonight Show on weeknights.

For the Las Vegas gigs, the nucleus of Severinsen's touring band (Young, conductor Steve Thoma, and drummer Paul Line) would commute to Vegas nightly, leaving Van Nuys Airport around 6pm via Lear jet, arriving in Las Vegas by 7pm. A limousine would transport the musicians directly backstage, where they would dress and prepare for an 8pm and midnight show. Then it was back to the airport for the ride back to Los Angeles, where Severinsen and Young had their NBC gig, and Steve Thomas and Paul Line were undertaking studio sessions daily.

Young performed nightly with Severinsen, and he was featured prominently for several solos, as well as a trumpet version of "Dueling Banjos". He continued to perform in Los Angeles, appearing on the 1976 Coconut Grove recording Bobby Bland and B.B. King Together Again...Live and again on King's 2008 album One Kind Favor.

He was one of the horn players that accompanied the rock group the Band on their 1972 live album Rock of Ages.

Young recorded only three albums under his own name. The 1971 album, Boys from Dayton, featured Norris Turney on alto sax, Booty Wood on trombone, Richard Tee on piano and organ, and Cornell Dupree on guitar. His 1978 album with altoist Marshal Royal, Snooky and Marshal's Album, featured pianist Ross Tompkins, rhythm guitarist Freddie Green, bassist Ray Brown and drummer Louie Bellson. Horn of Plenty features Ross Tompkins on piano, John Collins on guitar, Ray Brown on bass, and Jake Hanna on drums.

He received a NEA Jazz Masters Award for 2009 on October 17, 2008, at the Lincoln Center in New York City.

Throughout the years, Young recorded and performed with Gerald Wilson (a friend since their Lunceford days) and his Orchestra. Until 2010, he was still playing and recording with the Clayton-Hamilton Jazz Orchestra.

He died of a respiratory ailment in Newport Beach at the age of 92.

Harry "Sweets" Edison considered Ed Lewis and Snooky Young "the two greatest first trumpet players" he ever played with.

== Discography ==
=== As leader/co-leader ===
- 1971: Boys from Dayton
- 1978: Snooky and Marshal's Album (with Marshal Royal)
- 1979: Horn of Plenty

=== As sideman ===
- 1957: The Atomic Mr. Basie - Count Basie (Roulette) aka Basie and E=MC^{2}
- 1958: Basie Plays Hefti - Count Basie (Roulette)
- 1958: Sing Along with Basie - Joe Williams, Lambert, Hendricks & Ross and the Basie Band (Roulette)
- 1959: Basie One More Time - Count Basie (Roulette)
- 1959: Breakfast Dance and Barbecue - Count Basie (Roulette)
- 1959: In Person! - Tony Bennett and the Count Basie Orchestra.
- 1959: The Genius of Ray Charles - Ray Charles
- 1959: Everyday I Have the Blues - Joe Williams with the Count Basie Orchestra (Roulette)
- 1959: Dance Along with Basie - Count Basie (Roulette)
- 1959: Like Basie! - Paul Quinichette (United Artists)
- 1960: Not Now, I'll Tell You When - Count Basie (Roulette)
- 1960: The Count Basie Story - Count Basie (Roulette)
- 1960: Kansas City Suite - Count Basie (Roulette)
- 1961: The Legend - Count Basie (Roulette)
- 1962: Listen to Art Farmer and the Orchestra - Art Farmer (Mercury)
- 1962: Big Bags - Milt Jackson (Riverside)
- 1962: Down Home - Sam Jones (Riverside)
- 1962: That's How I Love the Blues! - Mark Murphy (Riverside)
- 1962: Impressions of Phaedra - Oliver Nelson (United Artists Jazz)
- 1962: The Complete Town Hall Concert - Charles Mingus (Blue Note)
- 1963: Any Number Can Win – Jimmy Smith
- 1963: For Someone I Love - Milt Jackson (Riverside)
- 1964: New Fantasy - Lalo Schifrin (Verve)
- 1964: My Kinda Groove - Herbie Mann (Atlantic)
- 1964: The Cat - Jimmy Smith (Verve)
- 1964: Great Scott!! - Shirley Scott
- 1964: Quincy Jones Explores the Music of Henry Mancini - Quincy Jones (Mercury)
- 1965: Quincy Plays for Pussycats - Quincy Jones (Mercury)
- 1965: Ray Brown / Milt Jackson - Milt Jackson and Ray Brown (Verve)
- 1965: Once a Thief and Other Themes - Lalo Schifrin (Verve)
- 1965: Jazz Dialogue - Modern Jazz Quartet (Atlantic)
- 1965: Wrapped Tight - Coleman Hawkins
- 1966: Gotta Travel On – Ray Bryant (Cadet)
- 1966: Oliver Nelson Plays Michelle - Oliver Nelson
- 1966: Moody and the Brass Figures - James Moody
- 1966: Happenings - Hank Jones and Oliver Nelson
- 1966: Our Mann Flute - Herbie Mann
- 1966: Spanish Rice - Clark Terry and Chico O'Farrill
- 1966: Encyclopedia of Jazz - Oliver Nelson
- 1966: The Sound of Feeling - Oliver Nelson
- 1966: The Total J.J. Johnson - J. J. Johnson (RCA Victor)
- 1966: Blue Notes - Johnny Hodges
- 1966: Lonesome Traveler – Ray Bryant (Cadet)
- 1966: Slow Freight – Ray Bryant (Cadet)
- 1967: The Spirit of '67 - Pee Wee Russell and Oliver Nelson
- 1967: Don't Sleep in the Subway - Johnny Hodges
- 1967: The Board of Directors - Count Basie with The Mills Brothers
- 1968: Silver Cycles - Eddie Harris
- 1968: Blues - The Common Ground - Kenny Burrell (Verve)
- 1968: Giblet Gravy - George Benson
- 1968: Up Above the Rock – Ray Bryant (Cadet)
- 1969: I've Gotta Be Me – Tony Bennett
- 1969: Soul '69 - Aretha Franklin (Atlantic)
- 1969: Mr. Blues Plays Lady Soul - Hank Crawford (Atlantic)
- 1969: Blues in Orbit - Gil Evans (Enja)
- 1969: Yusef Lateef's Detroit - Yusef Lateef (Atlantic)
- 1969: Central Park North (album) - Thad Jones / Mel Lewis Jazz Orchestra (Solid State)
- 1970: 3 Shades of Blue - Johnny Hodges (Flying Dutchman)
- 1970: Consummation - Thad Jones / Mel Lewis Jazz Orchestra (Blue Note Records)
- 1971: Plastic Dreams - Modern Jazz Quartet (Atlantic)
- 1971: Wild Horses Rock Steady - Johnny Hammond (Kudu)
- 1971: Stand by Me (Whatcha See Is Whatcha Get) - Bernard Purdie (Mega)
- 1972: Help Me Make it Through the Night - Hank Crawford (Kudu)
- 1972: Suite for Pops - Thad Jones / Mel Lewis Jazz Orchestra (A&M Horizon)
- 1972: Rock of Ages - The Band
- 1972: Can't Buy a Thrill - Steely Dan
- 1973: Enter the Dragon (soundtrack) - Lalo Schifrin
- 1974: Northern Windows - Hampton Hawes (Prestige)
- 1974: Brasswind - Gene Ammons (Prestige)
- 1974: Waitress in a Donut Shop - Maria Muldaur
- 1975: The San Francisco Concert - Hubert Laws (CTI)
- 1975: The Louis Bellson Explosion - Louis Bellson (Pablo)
- 1975: Black Miracle - Joe Henderson (Milestone)
- 1975: Ellington Is Forever, Ellington Is Forever Volume Two - Kenny Burrell (Fantasy)
- 1976: How Can You Live Like That? - Eddie Harris (Atlantic)
- 1976: Can't Hide Love - Carmen McRae (Blue Note)
- 1976: Time Is Running Out - Brass Fever (Impulse!)
- 1976: Bobby Bland and B.B. King Together Again...Live
- 1976: Everything Must Change - Randy Crawford
- 1976: Beautiful Noise - Neil Diamond
- 1976: Hawthorne Nights – Zoot Sims (Pablo)
- 1977: King Size - B.B. King
- 1980: Heritage – Kenny Burrell (AudioSource)
- 1981: Lomelin - Gerald Wilson's Orchestra of the 80's (Discovery)
- 1982: Jessica - Gerald Wilson's Orchestra of the 80's (Trend)
- 1983: Mostly Blues...and Some Others - Count Basie (Pablo)
- 1984: Calafia - Gerald Wilson's Orchestra of the 80's (Trend)
- 1988: Tribute to Count Basie - The Gene Harris All Star Big Band
- 1989: Jenna - Gerald Wilson's Orchestra of the 90's (Discovery)
- 1989: Crossroads - Tracy Chapman
- 1994: State Street Sweet - Gerald Wilson Orchestra (MAMA)
- 1997: Theme for Monterey - Gerald Wilson Orchestra (MAMA)
- 2008: One Kind Favor - B. B. King
