= Eternal Equinox =

Studio album by Gerald Wilson Orchestra
- Released: 1969
- Recorded: June 2 & 3, 1969; Liberty Studios, Hollywood, CA
- Genre: Jazz
- Label: Pacific Jazz; ST 20160
- Producer: Richard Bock

Gerald Wilson chronology
California Soul (1968)	Eternal Equinox (1969)	Lomelin (1981)

Eternal Equinox is an album by the Gerald Wilson Orchestra recorded in 1969 which became his last released on the Pacific Jazz label.

== Reception ==
Professional ratings
Review scores
Source	Rating
AllMusic	4.5/5 stars

AllMusic rated the album with 4½ stars.

== Track listing ==
All compositions by Gerald Wilson except as indicated

1. "Equinox" (John Coltrane) – 4:55
2. "Aquarius" (Galt MacDermot, Gerome Ragni, James Rado) – 3:01
3. "Pisces" – 4:05
4. "Scorpio Rising" – 4:35
5. "Celestial Soul" – 4:19
6. "Baby, Baby Don't Cry" (Al Cleveland, Terry Johnson, Smokey Robinson) – 3:00
7. "Yes, Me and Now" – 3:54
8. "Bluesnee" – 5:28
- Recorded at Liberty Studios in Hollywood, CA on June 2, 1969 (tracks 1, 2 & 5) and June 3, 1969 (tracks 3 & 6–8).

== Personnel ==
- Gerald Wilson – arranger, conductor
- Jay Daversa (tracks 1–3 & 5–8), Paul Hubinon, Larry McGuire, William Peterson (track 4), Tony Rusch (track 4) – trumpet
- Thurman Green, Lester Robinson (tracks 1–3 & 5–8), Frank Strong – trombone
- Alexander Thomas (tracks 1–3 & 5–8), Mike Wimberly (track 4) – bass trombone
- Arthur Maebe – French horn (tracks 1–3 & 5–8)
- William Green – flute, piccolo (tracks 1–3 & 5–8)
- Anthony Ortega – alto saxophone, flute
- Henry DeVega (tracks 1–3 & 5–8), Bud Shank (track 4) – alto saxophone
- Hadley Caliman, Harold Land – tenor saxophone (tracks 1–3 & 5–8)
- Ernie Watts – tenor saxophone, flute, piccolo (tracks 1–3 & 5–8)
- Richard Aplanalp – baritone saxophone
- Bobby Hutcherson – vibraphone (tracks 1–3 & 5–8)
- George Duke – piano
- Richard "Groove" Holmes – organ (tracks 1–3 & 5–8)
- Jean-Luc Ponty – violin (track 4)
- Wilbert Longmire – guitar (track 4)
- Bob West – electric bass
- Paul Humphrey (track 4), Carl Lott (tracks 1–3 & 5–8) – drums
- William Marshall – vocals (track 6)
