= Live and Swinging =

Live album by Gerald Wilson Orchestra
- Released: 1967
- Recorded: March 31 and April 1, 1967; Marty's on the Hill, Los Angeles, CA
- Genre: Jazz
- Label: Pacific Jazz; PJ 10118
- Producer: Richard Bock

Gerald Wilson chronology
The Golden Sword (1966)	Live and Swinging (1967)	Everywhere (1968)

Live and Swinging (subtitled The Gerald Wilson Orchestra Plays Standards and Blues) is a live album by the Gerald Wilson Orchestra recorded in 1967 and released on the Pacific Jazz label.

== Reception ==
Professional ratings
Review scores
Source	Rating
AllMusic	4/5 stars

AllMusic rated the album with 4 stars.

== Track listing ==
All compositions by Gerald Wilson except as indicated

1. "Paper Man" (Charles Tolliver) - 6:46
2. "I Should Care" (Axel Stordahl, Paul Weston, Sammy Cahn) - 3:27
3. "I Got It Bad (and That Ain't Good)" (Duke Ellington, Paul Francis Webster) - 4:10
4. "The "It's" Where It's At" - 5:38
5. "Blues for a Scorpio" - 5:52
6. "Li'l Darlin'" (Neal Hefti) - 5:17
7. "Misty" (Erroll Garner, Johnny Burke) - 3:03
8. "Viva Tirado" - 7:46
- Recorded at Marty's on the Hill in Los Angeles, CA on March 31, 1967 (tracks 2, 3 & 7) and April 1, 1967 (tracks 1, 4-6 & 8)

== Personnel ==
- Gerald Wilson - arranger, conductor
- Gary Barone, Dick Forrest, Larry McGuire, Al Porcino, Alex Rodriguez, Charles Tolliver - trumpet
- Mike Barone, Thurman Green, Lester Robinson - trombone
- Don Switzer - bass trombone
- Ramon Bojorquez, Anthony Ortega - alto saxophone
- Hadley Caliman, Harold Land - tenor saxophone
- Howard Johnson - baritone saxophone, tuba
- Phil Moore III - piano
- Jack Wilson - organ
- Buddy Woodson - bass
- Carl Lott - drums
