= Tribute to Count Basie =

1988 album by The Gene Harris All Star Big Band

Studio album by The Gene Harris All Star Big Band
- Released: 1988
- Recorded: March-June 1987
- Venue: Evergreen Studios
- Genres: Jazz; big band
- Length: 40:50
- Label: Concord Jazz
- Producer: Bennett Rubin

Gene Harris chronology
The Gene Harris Trio Plus One (1986)	Tribute to Count Basie (1988)	Listen Here! (1989)

Tribute to Count Basie is a 1988 studio album recorded by American jazz ensemble The Gene Harris All Star Big Band and released through Concord Jazz. The album includes covers of songs by American jazz musician Count Basie and other artists, as well as original material written in Basie's style. It was nominated for the Grammy Award for Best Large Jazz Ensemble Album at the 31st Annual Grammy Awards in 1989.

== Production and release ==
The project originated when bass musician Ray Brown and producer Bennett Rubin began discussing the creation of a tribute album to Basie. According to Rubin, Harris was selected to lead the band as he was a noted blues pianist who Brown and Rubin believed would be well suited to recording in Basie's style. Other musicians such as Snooky Young and Marshal Royal were invited to participate based on their association with Basie's bands in the past.

In describing the style of Tribute to Count Basie, jazz critic Nat Hentoff wrote that the album's aim "is to celebrate the 'spirit' of Count Basie" and that Harris "interweaves here the colors of the blues in much of what he plays." Hentoff also noted the presence of soloists such as Plas Johnson and Conte Candoli on the album, which he described as "essential, of course, to the Basie way of music".

Tribute to Count Basie was recorded over two sessions that took place in March and June 1987 at Evergreen Studios in Burbank, California. The album was released in 1988 by Concord Jazz, and was published on CD, LP record, and cassette.

== Live performances ==
Harris and the All Star Big Band performed songs from the album on 16 June 1988 at the Loa jazz club in Santa Monica, California. A. James Liska of the Los Angeles Times praised the performance, writing that the band "captured the spirit and precision swing for which Basie was noted".

== Reception ==
Professional ratings
Review scores
Source	Rating
AllMusic	3/5 stars
The Penguin Guide to Jazz	3/4 stars

Tribute to Count Basie was generally well received. Scott Yanow of AllMusic wrote that "Harris' 16-piece orchestra does bring back the spirit of Basie's band in spots", but considered the music to be "a bit predictable". Richard Cook and Brian Morton, writing in The Penguin Guide to Jazz on CD, LP & Cassette, noted that the album was "a very truthful kind of tribute to Basie's band", awarding it three out of four stars.

The album was nominated for the Grammy Award for Best Large Jazz Ensemble Album at the 31st Annual Grammy Awards in 1989, but lost to Bud and Bird by Gil Evans.

== Track listing ==
All tracks are arranged by Frank Wess, except where noted.

No.	Title	Length
1.	"Captain Bill (Note: Arrangement by John Clayton)"	3:56
2.	"Night Mist Blues"	7:35
3.	"Swingin' the Blues (Note: Arrangement by Mickey Tucker)"	4:17
4.	"When Did You Leave Heaven"	4:29
5.	"Blues for Pepper"	4:52
6.	"Blue and Sentimental"	4:33
7.	"Riled Up"	4:31
8.	"The Masquerade is Over"	6:59
9.	"Dejection Blues"	5:02
Total length:		46:50

== Personnel ==
Credits are adapted from the album's liner notes.

=== Musicians ===
- Gene Harris - piano
- Jon Faddis - trumpet
- Snooky Young - trumpet (Note: Only performs on "Swingin' the Blues", "Dejection Blues", and "When Did You Leave Heaven")
- Conte Candoli - trumpet
- Frank Szabo - trumpet
- Bobby Bryant - trumpet
- Charlie Loper - trombone
- Bill Watrous - trombone (Note: Only performs on "Captain Bill", "Night Mist Blues", "Blue and Sentimental", "Riled Up", and "The Masquerade is Over")
- Thurman Green - trombone
- Garnett Brown - trombone
- Bill Reichenbach Jr. - bass trombone
- Marshal Royal - alto saxophone
- Bill Green - alto saxophone
- Jackie Kelso - alto saxophone (Note: Erroneously credited as "Jackie Kelson")
- Bob Cooper - tenor saxophone
- Plas Johnson - tenor saxophone
- Jack Nimitz - baritone saxophone
- Herb Ellis - guitar
- Ray Brown - bass
- James Leary - bass
- Jeff Hamilton - drums

=== Production and recording ===
- Bennett Rubin - producer
- Danny Wallin - recording engineer
- Phil Edwards - recording engineer, remix engineer
- Rick Winquist - assistant engineer
- George Horn - mastering
- Tom Burgess - art direction
- David Fischer - cover photograph
