= Theme for Monterey =

Studio album by Gerald Wilson Orchestra
- Released: March 24, 1998
- Recorded: November 24 & 25, 1997
- Studio: Capitol (Hollywood)
- Genre: Jazz
- Length: 63:15
- Label: MAMA; MMF 1021
- Producer: Douglas Evans

Gerald Wilson chronology
State Street Sweet (1994)	Theme for Monterey (1998)	New York, New Sound (2003)

Theme for Monterey is an album by the Gerald Wilson Orchestra, recorded in 1997 and released on the MAMA label.

== Reception ==
Professional ratings
Review scores
Source	Rating
AllMusic	4.5/5 stars
The Penguin Guide to Jazz Recordings	4/4 stars

AllMusic's Scott Yanow noted: "In 1997, bandleader/arranger Gerald Wilson was commissioned by the Monterey Jazz Festival to write an original piece to be performed at that year's festival. Wilson's goal was to compose a melody that the audience would leave the venue singing to themselves. He succeeded by casting his 'Theme for Monterey' in five different styles, with his big band interpreting the theme in a variety of moods—as a ballad, a Latin romp, a medium-tempo piece and a shouting conclusion... Highly recommended". In JazzTimes, Bill Bennett wrote: "Throughout, Wilson's dense orchestrations hinge on sharp accents and grand sweep and provide surging support for strong solos".

== Track listing ==
All compositions by Gerald Wilson except where noted.

1. "Theme for Monterey: Romance" - 6:29
2. "Theme for Monterey: Lyon's Roar" - 12:18
3. "Theme for Monterey: The Lone Cypress" - 9:30
4. "Theme for Monterey: Spanish Bay" - 8:49
5. "Theme for Monterey: Cookin' on Cannery Row" - 6:51
6. "Summertime" (George Gershwin, Ira Gershwin, DuBose Heyward) - 13:27
7. "Anthropology" (Charlie Parker, Dizzy Gillespie) - 5:51

== Personnel ==
- Gerald Wilson - arranger, conductor
- Ron Barrows, Oscar Brashear, Carl Saunders, Snooky Young, Dave Krimsley - trumpet
- Leslie Benedict, George Bohanon, Isaac Smith - trombone
- Louis Taylor - soprano saxophone
- Scott Mayo - soprano saxophone, alto saxophone, tenor saxophone
- Randall Willis - alto saxophone, tenor saxophone
- Carl Randall - tenor saxophone
- Jack Nimitz - baritone saxophone
- Brian O'Rourke - piano
- Eric Veliotes, Anthony Wilson - guitar
- Trey Henry - bass
- Mel Lee - drums
