= Moment of Truth (Gerald Wilson album) =

Studio album by Gerald Wilson Big Band
- Released: 1962
- Recorded: August 27, and September 1962; Pacific Jazz Studios, Los Angeles, CA
- Genre: Jazz
- Length: 33:30
- Label: Pacific Jazz; PJ 61
- Producer: Richard Bock

Gerald Wilson chronology
You Better Believe It! (1961)	Moment of Truth (1962)	Portraits (1964)

Moment of Truth is an album that the Gerald Wilson Big Band recorded in 1962 and released on the Pacific Jazz label.

== Reception ==
Professional ratings
Review scores
Source	Rating
AllMusic	4.5/5 stars
Record Collector	4/5 stars

AllMusic rated the album with 4½ stars; in his review, Scott Yanow said: "Gerald Wilson's Pacific Jazz albums of the 1960s were arguably the most significant of his career. ...Recommended".

== Track listing ==
All compositions by Gerald Wilson except as indicated

1. "Viva Tirado" - 5:40
2. "Moment of Truth" - 4:15
3. "Patterns" - 5:54
4. "Teri" - 2:54
5. "Nancy Joe" - 2:37
6. "Milestones" (Miles Davis) - 5:30
7. "Latino" - 5:00
8. "Josefina" - 4:18
9. "Emerge" (Lester Robertson) - 3:22

== Personnel ==
- Gerald Wilson - arranger and conductor
- John Audino, Jules Chaiken, Freddie Hill, Carmell Jones, Al Porcino (tracks 6–9) - trumpet
- Lou Blackburn, Bob Edmondson, Lester Robertson (tracks 6–9), Frank Strong (tracks 6–9) - trombone
- Bob Knight - bass trombone
- Joe Maini - alto saxophone
- Bud Shank - alto saxophone, flute
- Teddy Edwards, Harold Land - tenor saxophone
- Jack Nimitz (tracks 6–9), Don Raffell - baritone saxophone
- Jack Wilson - piano
- Joe Pass - guitar
- Jimmy Bond - bass
- Mel Lewis - drums
- Modesto Duran - congas (tracks 1 & 7)
