= Lomelin =

Studio album by Gerald Wilson Orchestra of the 80's
- Released: 1981
- Recorded: March 13 & 14, 1981
- Studio: T.T.G. Studio 1, Los Angeles, CA
- Genre: Jazz
- Label: Discovery; DS-833
- Producer: Albert Marx

Gerald Wilson chronology
| Eternal Equinox (1969) | Lomelin (1981) | Jessica (1982) |

Lomelin is an album by the Gerald Wilson Orchestra, recorded in 1981 and released on the Discovery label.

== Reception ==
Professional ratings
Review scores
| Source | Rating |
|---|---|
| AllMusic | 4/5 stars |

AllMusic rated the album with 4 stars; in his review, Scott Yanow noted: "Wilson's arranging style was essentially the same as it had been in the 1960s and his large big band featured many alumni plus some other younger L.A.-based jazzmen... The music is straight-ahead with plenty of solo space."

== Track listing ==
All compositions by Gerald Wilson.

1. "Lomelin" - 9:05
2. "Ay-Ee-En (Anthony Eric Nichols)" - 7:15
3. "See You Later" - 6:37
4. "You Know" - 7:30
5. "Triple Chase" - 6:10
6. "Blues for Zubin" - 8:20

== Personnel ==
- Gerald Wilson - arranger, conductor
- Bobby Bryant, Rick Baptist, Snooky Young, Oscar Brashear - trumpet, flugelhorn
- Jimmy Cleveland, Garnett Brown, Thurman Green - trombone
- Maurice Spears - bass trombone
- Jerome Richardson - flute, piccolo, alto saxophone, soprano saxophone, tenor saxophone
- Buddy Collette, Henry de Vega, Roger Hogan - alto saxophone, flute, piccolo
- Ernie Watts, Harold Land - tenor saxophone, flute
- Jack Nimitz - baritone saxophone
- Mike Wofford - piano
- Harold Land, Jr. - electric piano
- Robert Conti, Shuggie Otis - guitar
- Johnny Williams - bass
- Paul Humphrey - drums, percussion
