= Portraits (Gerald Wilson album) =

Studio album by Gerald Wilson Orchestra
- Released: 1964
- Recorded: December 2, 1963 and January 8, 1964
- Studio: Pacific Jazz Studios, Los Angeles, CA
- Genre: Jazz
- Length: 37:33
- Label: Pacific Jazz; PJ 80
- Producer: Richard Bock

Gerald Wilson chronology
Moment of Truth (1962)	Portraits (1964)	McCann/Wilson (1964)

Portraits is an album by the Gerald Wilson Orchestra recorded in late 1963 and early 1964 and released on the Pacific Jazz label.

== Reception ==
Professional ratings
Review scores
Source	Rating
AllMusic	4/5 stars

AllMusic rated the album with 4 stars; in his review, Scott Yanow said: "this was a very impressive unit although now somewhat underrated".

== Track listing ==
All compositions by Gerald Wilson except as indicated

1. "So What" (Miles Davis) - 5:55
2. "Caprichos" - 6:55
3. "Paco" - 6:10
4. "Ravi" - 5:53
5. "Aram" - 3:43
6. "'Round Midnight" (Thelonious Monk) - 5:10
7. "Eric" - 3:11

== Personnel ==
- Gerald Wilson - arranger and conductor
- Jules Chaikin, Freddie Hill, Carmell Jones, Nat Meeks, Al Porcino - trumpet
- Bob Edmondson, John Ewing, Lew McCreary (tracks 2, 5 & 7), Lester Robertson (tracks 1, 3, 4 & 6) - trombone
- Don Switzer - bass trombone
- Bud Shank - flute (track 2)
- Joe Maini, Jimmy Woods - alto saxophone
- Teddy Edwards, Harold Land - tenor saxophone
- Jack Nimitz - baritone saxophone
- Jack Wilson - piano
- Joe Pass - guitar
- Dave Dyson (tracks 2, 5 & 7), Leroy Vinnegar (tracks 1, 3, 4 & 6) - bass
- Chuck Carter - drums
