= Everywhere (Gerald Wilson album) =

Studio album by Gerald Wilson Orchestra
- Released: 1968
- Recorded: December 4, 1967 and January 2, 1968; Liberty Studios, Hollywood, CA
- Genre: Jazz
- Label: Pacific Jazz; PJ 10132
- Producer: Richard Bock

Gerald Wilson chronology
Live and Swinging (1967)	Everywhere (1968)	California Soul (1968)

Everywhere is an album by the Gerald Wilson Orchestra recorded in late 1967 and early 1968 and released on the Pacific Jazz label.

== Reception ==
Professional ratings
Review scores
Source	Rating
AllMusic	3/5 stars

AllMusic rated the album with 3 stars; in his review, Scott Yanow noted: "None of the individual tunes or performances on this out of print set caught on (nor would any make it into Wilson's greatest-hits collections), but the overall music is pleasing and swinging".

== Track listing ==
All compositions by Gerald Wilson except as indicated

1. "Everywhere" - 4:19
2. "Out of This World" (Harold Arlen, Johnny Mercer) - 5:36
3. "Pretty Polly" (Michel Legrand, Don Black) - 2:30
4. "M. Capetillo" - 2:42
5. "Little Bit of Soul" - 3:50
6. "Do I Love You" (Richard Rodgers, Oscar Hammerstein II) - 2:53
7. "Del Olivar" - 4:53
8. "Mini Waltz" - 4:47
- Recorded at Liberty Studios in Hollywood, CA on December 4, 1967 (tracks 1, 4, 5 & 7) and January 2, 1968 (tracks 2, 3, 6 & 8).

== Personnel ==
- Gerald Wilson - arranger, conductor
- Gary Barone (tracks 2, 3, 6 & 8), Bobby Bryant (tracks 2, 3, 6 & 8), Dick Forrest, Steve Huffsteter (tracks 1, 4, 5 & 7), Bill Mattison (tracks 1, 4, 5 & 7), Alex Rodriguez - trumpet
- Thurman Green, Lester Robertson, Frank Strong - trombone
- Mike Wimberly - bass trombone
- William Green - flute, piccolo
- Ramon Bojorquez, Henry DeVega (tracks 2, 3, 6 & 8) - alto saxophone
- Anthony Ortega - alto saxophone, flute, alto flute
- Hadley Caliman, Harold Land - tenor saxophone
- Richard Aplanalp - baritone saxophone
- Bobby Hutcherson - vibraphone
- Jack Wilson - piano, organ
- Joe Pass - guitar
- Stanley Gilbert (tracks 2, 3, 6 & 8), Buddy Woodson (tracks 1, 4, 5 & 7) - bass
- Frank Butler (tracks 2, 3, 6 & 8), Carl Lott (tracks 1, 4, 5 & 7) - drums
- Moises Obligacion - congas (tracks 1, 4, 5 & 7)
- Hugh Anderson - percussion
