= Monterey Moods =

Studio album by Gerald Wilson Orchestra
- Released: September 25, 2007
- Recorded: 2007
- Studio: Legacy Recording, Studio A, NYC
- Genre: Jazz
- Length: 59:29
- Label: Mack Avenue; MAC 1039
- Producer: Al Pryor

Gerald Wilson chronology
In My Time (2005)	Monterey Moods (2007)	Detroit (2009)

Monterey Moods is an album by the Gerald Wilson Orchestra recorded in 2007 and released on the Mack Avenue label.

== Reception ==
Professional ratings
Review scores
Source	Rating
AllMusic	4/5 stars
The Guardian	3/5 stars
All About Jazz	4/5 stars
The Penguin Guide to Jazz Recordings	3/4 stars

AllMusic rated the album with 4 stars; in his review, Michael G. Nastos noted: "The music is for the most part punchy, vital, and alive with the spirit of the breezy, ocean-splashed, spacious West Coast... It's easy to hear Wilson at the peak of his very formidable powers, and this recording is highly recommended for those who enjoy the modern mainstream big-band sound of now". The Guardian's review by John Fordham said "Gerald Wilson has confirmed the awesome firepower he still commands - both as a writer and a hirer of some of the best soloists". In JazzTimes Thomas Conrad wrote: "This album lacks the sweep and majesty of Wilson’s best recordings of the ’60s and ’70s, but the charts are graceful, the section work is clean, and the joy is real". On All About Jazz Jack Bowers noted: "the 89-year-old dean of American Jazz composers has scored another triumph, saluting the festival's golden anniversary with a picturesque seven-part suite, Monterey Moods, that musically epitomizes the scope and character of that annual event".

== Track listing ==
All compositions by Gerald Wilson except where noted.

1. "Monterey Moods Suite":
  1. "Allegro" - 6:12
  2. "Jazz Swing Waltz" - 9:09
  3. "Ballad" - 7:09
  4. "Latin Swing" - 11:36
  5. "Blues" - 10:00
  6. "Bass Solo" - 2:27
  7. "Hard Swing" - 1:40
2. "I Concentrate on You" (Cole Porter) - 6:00
3. "The Mini Waltz" - 5:26

== Personnel ==
- Gerald Wilson - arranger, conductor
- Hubert Laws - flute
- Jon Faddis, Frank Greene, Sean Jones, Jimmy Owens, Terell Stafford - trumpet, flugelhorn
- Jay Ashby, Luis Bonilla, Douglas Purviance, Dennis Wilson - trombone
- Antonio Hart, Steve Wilson - alto saxophone, soprano saxophone, flute
- Ron Blake, Kamasi Washington - tenor saxophone
- Renee Rosnes - piano
- Anthony Wilson - guitar
- Peter Washington, Todd Coolman - bass
- Lewis Nash - drums
