= Detroit (Gerald Wilson album) =

Studio album by Gerald Wilson Orchestra
- Released: September 28, 2009
- Recorded: 2009; New York and Los Angeles
- Genre: Jazz
- Length: 62:47
- Label: Mack Avenue; MAC 1049
- Producer: Al Pryor

Gerald Wilson chronology
Monterey Moods (2007)	Detroit (2009)	Legacy (2011)

Detroit is an album by the Gerald Wilson Orchestra recorded in 2009 and released on the Mack Avenue label.

== Reception ==
Professional ratings
Review scores
Source	Rating
AllMusic	4/5 stars
All About Jazz	5/5 stars

AllMusic rated the album with 4 stars; in his review, Michael G. Nastos noted: "A quite spirited and energetic music is heard here from the 90-year-old Wilson, whose charm and wit would rival anyone many decades his junior. It's a swinging affair molded in the traditional big-band visage of Count Basie, Ernie Wilkins, or early Quincy Jones, with Wilson's deft touch for embellishing the blues". In JazzTimes Owen Cordle wrote: "Wilson’s chord progressions, chord voicings and rhythmic figures for the ensemble are strong characteristics of his writing. He also has a flair for atmospheric themes. One could quibble about the combo-esque strings of solos and the scarcity of ensemble interludes. Nevertheless, his writing style continues to serve him well". On All About Jazz Robert J. Robbins noted: "Gerald Wilson's six-movement "Detroit Suite" demonstrates that after nearly seven decades in the music business, the nonagenarian composer and arranger still has a great deal to offer in terms of musical creativity".

== Track listing ==
All compositions by Gerald Wilson.

1. "Blues on Belle Isle" - 5:30
2. "Cass Tech" - 8:47
3. "Detroit" - 6:40
4. "Miss Gretchen" - 7:07
5. "Before Motown" - 7:12
6. "The Detroit River" - 8:47
7. "Everywhere" - 12:32
8. "Aram" - 6:12

== Personnel ==
- Gerald Wilson - arranger, conductor
- Los Angeles Band (tracks 1–6):
  - Jeff Kaye, Rick Baptist, Winston Bird, Ron Barrows - trumpet
  - Eric Jorgensen, Les Benedict, Mike Wimberly, Shaunte Palmer - trombone
  - Carl Randall, Kamasi Washington, Jackie Kelso, Louis Van Taylor, Randall Willis, Terry Laudry - reeds
  - Brian O' Rourke - piano
  - Trey Henry - bass
  - Mell Lee - drums
  - Special guests: Sean Jones - trumpet, flugelhorn and Anthony Wilson - guitar
- New York Band (tracks 7 & 8):
  - Jon Faddis, Frank Greene, Sean Jones, Jimmy Owens, Terrell Stafford - trumpet
  - Dennis Wilson, Luis Bonilla, Jay Ashby, Douglas Purviance - trombone
  - Steve Wilson, Antonio Hart, Ron Blake, Kamasi Washington, Ronnie Cuber - reeds
  - Renee Rosnes - piano
  - Peter Washington - bass
  - Anthony Wilson - guitar
  - Lewis Nash - drums
  - Special guest: Hubert Laws - flute
