= Equinox (composition) =

Composition by John Coltrane

from the album Coltrane's Sound
- Released: June 1964
- Recorded: October 24 & 26, 1960
- Studio: Atlantic, New York City
- Genre: Jazz
- Length: 8:33
- Label: Atlantic
- Composer: John Coltrane
- Producer: Nesuhi Ertegün

"Equinox" is a minor blues jazz standard by American jazz saxophone player and composer John Coltrane. It was originally released on Coltrane's Sound played in C^{#} minor with a slow swing feel. However, it is usually played in C minor.

== Name ==
Coltrane's wife Naima named the song "Equinox". The equinox occurs twice a year, when the tilt of the Earth's axis is inclined neither away from nor towards the Sun. Coltrane was born September 23, 1926, that year's autumn equinox.

The release of "Equinox" was delayed until 1964, when Atlantic issued Coltrane's Sound. Before Coltrane recorded the tune, he had performed it live, including a session with Miles Davis' rhythm section and the 1960 Monterey Jazz Festival. Other Atlantic recordings of "Equinox" were lost in a 1978 warehouse fire before they were released. Unlike "Naima" and "My Favorite Things", "Equinox" would not become part of Coltrane's repertoire.

Coltrane's attitude in writing "Equinox" was described by Dr. Lewis Porter: "Coltrane was a serious blues player and his blues pieces reflect the desire to get back to a primal mood, and away from the emotionally lighter, harmonically more complicated and complex blues of the boppers."

== Original recording ==
"Equinox" is introduced by McCoy Tyner (piano) and Elvin Jones (drums) with a Latin rhythmic passage; this shifts into the slower tempo of the main theme. Coltrane then enters on tenor, his playing slow and pensive. The theme is repeated twice, after which Coltrane proceeds with an improvisation of unusual emotional depth - reminiscent of a preacher exhorting his congregation. Elvin Jones makes dramatic use of drum rolls and cymbal crashes throughout to maintain the sense of mystery, while McCoy Tyner complements with a light feel.

== Form and lead sheet ==
"Equinox" is a 12-bar minor blues with a 14-bar introduction. The head is played twice before and after the solos.

‖:	C#m	|	F#m	|	:‖
‖:	C#m	|	C#m	|	C#m	|	C#m	:‖
‖:	C#m7	|	C#m7	|	C#m7	|	C#m7	|
|	F#m7	|	F#m7	|	C#m7	|	C#m7	|
|	A7	|	G#7	|	C#m7	|	C#m7	:|

== Cover versions ==
"Equinox" has been covered by:

- Larry Coryell, John Scofield and Joe Beck on album Tributaries (Novus Records, 1979).
- Jaco Pastorius on live album Live in New York City, Volume Four: Trio...2 (Big World Music, 1992).
- Gerald Wilson Orchestra on album Eternal Equinox (Pacific Jazz Records, 1969).
- Rhoda Scott on live recording Rhoda Scott - Live at the Olympia (1972).
- Hubert Laws on album Wild Flower (1972).
- Pharoah Sanders on album Oh Lord, Let Me Do No Wrong (1987).
- Dave Valentin on album Primitive Passions (1996).
- Liquid Soul on album Liquid Soul (1996).
- Jessica Williams on album Equinox (2007).
- Clutch on album Slow Hole to China: Rare and Unreleased (2009).
- Ronnie Earl (guitar) on albums Still River (1993) and Just For Today (2013).
- Eddie Daniels on album Nepenthe (GRP, 1990)
- Gil Scott-Heron on album Spirits (1994).
- Joel Ross on album nublues (2024)
