= Legacy (Gerald Wilson album) =

Studio album by Gerald Wilson Orchestra
- Released: June 20, 2011
- Recorded: 2011
- Studio: Avatar (New York, New York)
- Genre: Jazz
- Length: 49:51
- Label: Mack Avenue; MAC 1056
- Producer: Al Pryor

Gerald Wilson chronology
Detroit (2009)	Legacy (2011)

Legacy is an album by the Gerald Wilson Orchestra recorded in 2011 and released on the Mack Avenue label.

== Reception ==
Professional ratings
Review scores
Source	Rating
AllMusic	4.5/5 stars
All About Jazz	4.5/5 stars

AllMusic rated the album with 4½ stars; in his review, Ken Dryden noted: "This outstanding recording adds to the already substantial discography of the great Gerald Wilson". In JazzTimes Bill Beuttler wrote: "Gerald Wilson’s new album, Legacy, is aptly titled. His son Anthony Wilson and grandson Eric Otis each contribute a composition to the project, which is anchored by Wilson’s own seven-part suite "Yes Chicago Is…", a celebration of his home through much of the 1940s. Wilson, who turns 93 in September, conducted a standout band of 20 for the session". On All About Jazz Raul D'Gama Rose noted: "Aside from the sophistication of the music—putting it in a stellar region all its own—Wilson digs ever so deeply into his own heart and soul, and finds the magical element of the blues in its most visceral and elemental form. That and the almost vanishing aspect of great jazz: swing".

== Track listing ==
All compositions by Gerald Wilson except where noted.

1. "Variation on a Theme by Igor Stravinsky" - 3:34
2. "Virgo" (Anthony Wilson) - 9:58
3. "Variations on Clair de Lune" - 7:35
4. "Variation on a Theme by Giacomo Puccini" - 6:20
5. "September Sky" (Eric Otis) - 7:05
6. "Yes Chicago Is...(Suite):"
  1. "A Jazz Mecca" - 2:09
  2. "A Night at the El Grotto" - 3:42
  3. "Riffin' at the Regal" - 1:55
  4. "Cubs, Bears, Bulls, and White Sox" - 3:09
  5. "47th St. Blues" - 1:06
  6. "Blowin' in the Windy City" - 1:01
  7. "A Great Place to Be" - 2:17

== Personnel ==
- Gerald Wilson - arranger, conductor
- Frank Greene, Freddie Hendrix, Sean Jones, Tony Lujan, Jeremy Pelt - trumpet, flugelhorn
- Luis Bonilla, Alan Ferber, Dennis Wilson - trombone
- Douglas Purviance - bass trombone
- Antonio Hart, Dick Oatts - alto saxophone, flute
- Ron Blake, Kamasi Washington - tenor saxophone
- Gary Smulyan - baritone saxophone
- Renee Rosnes - piano
- Anthony Wilson - guitar
- Peter Washington - bass
- Lewis Nash - drums
