= You Better Believe It! =

1961 studio album by Gerald Wilson Orchestra

Studio album by Gerald Wilson Orchestra
- Released: 1961
- Recorded: September 9 & 30, 1961; Pacific Jazz Studios, Los Angeles, California
- Genre: Jazz
- Length: 33:30
- Label: Pacific Jazz; PJ 34
- Producer: Richard Bock

Gerald Wilson chronology
You Better Believe It! (1961)	Moment of Truth (1962)

You Better Believe It! is an album by jazz musician and bandleader Gerald Wilson. Recorded in 1961 for the Pacific Jazz label, it featuring a 17-piece orchestra, the music is arranged, directed and mainly composed by Wilson. The orchestra is made up of West Coast-based musicians such as Richard "Groove" Holmes, Harold Land, and Carmell Jones.

== Reception ==
Professional ratings
Review scores
Source	Rating
AllMusic	4/5 stars

AllMusic rated the album with 4 stars; in his review, Joe Viglion said: "The 17-piece orchestra performs like a trio or quartet, each musician knowing where to be and when to execute, so the tension shifts and the moods change as subtle instrumentation slides in track by instrumental track. Shifting from quiet to quickly dramatic, the ideas keep flowing from Wilson's creative fount ".

== Track listing ==
All compositions by Gerald Wilson except as indicated

1. "Blues for Yna Yna" - 6:51
2. "Jeri" - 3:40
3. "Moody Blue" - 3:05
4. "Straight Up and Down" - 3:49
5. "The Wailer" - 7:16
6. "You Better Believe It" (Richard "Groove" Holmes, Gerald Wilson) - 5:16
7. "Yvette" - 3:33

== Personnel ==
- Gerald Wilson - arranger and conductor
- John Audino, Carmell Jones, Al Porcino (tracks 2, 3, 6 & 7), Jack Trainor (tracks 2, 3, 6 & 7), Ray Triscari (tracks 1, 4 & 5), Jimmy Zito (tracks 1, 4 & 5) - trumpet
- Bob Edmondson, John Ewing, Lester Robertson (tracks 1, 4 & 5), Frank Strong (tracks 2, 3, 6 & 7) - trombone
- Kenny Shroyer - bass trombone
- Buddy Collette - clarinet, alto saxophone, flute
- Harry Klee (tracks 1, 4 & 5), Joe Maini (tracks 2, 3, 6 & 7) - alto saxophone
- Walter Benton (tracks 2, 3, 6 & 7), Teddy Edwards, Harold Land (tracks 1, 4 & 5) - tenor saxophone
- Jack Nimitz (tracks 1, 4 & 5) Don Raffell (tracks 2, 3, 6 & 7) - baritone saxophone
- Richard "Groove" Holmes - organ
- Gene Edwards - guitar (tracks 2, 3, 6 & 7)
- Jimmy Bond - bass
- Mel Lewis - drums
