= Hadley Caliman (album) =

Studio album by Hadley Caliman
- Released: 1971
- Recorded: 1971 in NYC
- Genre: Jazz
- Length: 31:05
- Labels: Mainstream; MRL 318
- Producer: Bob Shad

Hadley Caliman chronology
Hadley Caliman (album) (1971)	Iapetus (1972)

Hadley Caliman is the debut album recorded by American saxophonist Hadley Caliman in 1971 for the Mainstream label.

== Reception ==
Professional ratings
Review scores
Source	Rating
AllMusic	4/5 stars

AllMusic states "Despite the fact that this isn't the most fully confident release in Caliman's Mainstream catalog it is noteworthy for introducing a very solid and creative voice on the tenor horn ... If it has any real faults, it's ultimately that the leader proves too democratic at his own expense. This serves as an introduction to a fine re-appraisal of one of jazz's more forgotten talents".

== Track listing ==
All compositions by Hadley Caliman except where noted.

1. "Cigar Eddie" – 6:25
2. "Comencio" – 7:40
3. "Little One" – 4:44
4. "Blues for L. L." (Larry Vuckovich) – 8:40
5. "Kickin' on the Inside" – 4:50
6. "Longing" (Vuckovich) – 2:46

== Personnel ==
- Hadley Caliman – tenor saxophone, flute
- Larry Vuckovich – piano
- John White Jr. – guitar
- Bill Douglas – bass
- Clarence Becton – drums
