= Jenna (album) =

Studio album by Gerald Wilson's Orchestra of the 90's [sic]
- Released: 1989
- Recorded: June 27 & 28, 1989
- Studio: Sage & Sound Recording, Hollywood, CA
- Genre: Jazz
- Length: 60:15
- Label: Discovery; DSCD-964
- Producer: Albert Marx

Gerald Wilson chronology
Calafia (1984)	Jenna (1989)	State Street Sweet (1994)

Jenna is an album by Gerald Wilson's Orchestra of the 90's [sic] recorded in 1989 and released on the Discovery label.

== Reception ==
Professional ratings
Review scores
Source	Rating
AllMusic	4.5/5 stars

AllMusic rated the album with 4½ stars; in his review, Scott Yanow noted: "This CD is an excellent all-round showcase for both Gerald Wilson's arrangements and his superior big band".

== Track listing ==
All compositions by Gerald Wilson except where noted.

1. "Love for Sale" (Cole Porter) - 4:13
2. "Jenna" - 9:46
3. "Carlos" - 5:19
4. "Back to the Roots" - 5:01
5. "The Wailer" - 4:28
6. "Blues for Yna Yna" - 6:53
7. "B-Bop & the Song" - 5:19
8. "Couldn't Love, Couldn't Cry" - 2:34
9. "Yarddog Mazurka" - 3:14
10. "48 Years Later" - 3:20
11. "Lunceford Special" (Jimmie Lunceford) - 3:33
12. "Margie" (Con Conrad, J. Russel Robinson, Benny Davis) - 3:12
13. "Flying Home" (Lionel Hampton, Benny Goodman, Sid Robin) - 3:23

== Personnel ==
- Gerald Wilson - arranger, conductor
- Rick Baptist, Ronald Barrows, Oscar Brashear, Robert Clark, Snooky Young - trumpet
- Luis Bonilla, Thurman Green, Charles Loper - trombone
- Maurice Spears - bass trombone
- Daniel House, Carl Randall, John Stephens, Louis Taylor Jr. - saxophones
- Randall Willis - baritone saxophone, alto saxophone
- Michael Cain - piano
- Anthony Wilson - guitar
- Stanley Gilbert - bass
- Mel Lee - drums
