= In My Time (Gerald Wilson album) =

Studio album by Gerald Wilson Orchestra
- Released: September 26, 2005
- Recorded: 2005
- Studio: Right Track Recording, NYC
- Genre: Jazz
- Length: 75:08
- Label: Mack Avenue; MAC 1025
- Producer: Al Pryor

Gerald Wilson chronology
New York, New Sound (2003)	In My Time (2005)	Monterey Moods (2007)

In My Time is an album by the Gerald Wilson Orchestra, recorded in 2005 and released on the Mack Avenue label.

== Reception ==
Professional ratings
Review scores
Source	Rating
All About Jazz	5/5 stars
AllMusic	4.5/5 stars
The Penguin Guide to Jazz Recordings	4/4 stars

AllMusic rated the album with 4½ stars; in his review, Scott Yanow noted: "it is the enthusiastic arranger/bandleader who takes honors with his consistently inventive writing and (one imagines) enthusiastic conducting. Highly recommended". In JazzTimes, Harvey Siders wrote: "while his concerted writing may be dense, it also swings fluidly. ...this is remarkably youthful vim and vigor for an 87-year-old". On All About Jazz, Marcia Hillman noted: "The octogenerian leader pays no attention to the numbers in his age. The music he writes, arranges and conducts is fresh and vital. This is big band music at its best, full of energy and excitement". The Penguin Guide to Jazz Recordings describe the album as having “power directed by invention and softened by sheer musicality.”

== Track listing ==
All compositions by Gerald Wilson except where noted.

1. "Sax Chase" - 10:22
2. "The Diminished Triangle: Dorian" - 7:27
3. "The Diminished Triangle: Ray's Vision at the U" - 4:25
4. "The Diminished Triangle: Blues for Manhattan" - 8:47
5. "Lomelin" - 7:45
6. "A.E.N." - 10:26
7. "Musette" - 5:48
8. "So What" (Miles Davis) - 11:09
9. "Love for Sale" (Cole Porter) - 5:05
10. "Jeri" - 3:54

== Personnel ==
- Gerald Wilson - arranger, conductor
- Jon Faddis, Eddie Henderson, Sean Jones (tracks 2–5, 8 & 9), Jimmy Owens, Jeremy Pelt (tracks 1, 6, 7 & 10), Mike Rodriguez - trumpet
- Luis Bonilla, Benny Powell, Dennis Wilson - trombone
- Douglas Purviance - bass trombone
- Jerry Dodgion - alto saxophone, soprano saxophone, flute
- Steve Wilson - alto saxophone, flute
- Dustin Cicero - alto saxophone
- Ron Blake - tenor saxophone, flute
- Kamasi Washington - tenor saxophone
- Gary Smulyan - baritone saxophone
- Renee Rosnes - piano
- Russell Malone - guitar
- Peter Washington - bass
- Lewis Nash - drums
