= Anthony Wilson (album) =

Studio album by Anthony Wilson
- Released: July 1, 1997
- Genre: Jazz
- Label: MAMA

Anthony Wilson is an album by jazz guitarist Anthony Wilson.

== Background ==
This was Wilson's debut album. He commented that using a nonet meant that the album "is a record of experimentation, of me finding a sound. I love this instrumentation. It preserves the sound of a small band, but it can sound big when I want it to".

== Music and recording ==
Seven of the 10 tracks are Wilson originals. He also wrote all of the arrangements, except for "The Parisian Knights", which he transcribed from the original Lucky Thompson recording. The album was released on July 1, 1997, by MAMA Records.

== Reception ==
Professional ratings
Review scores
Source	Rating
AllMusic	4.5/5 stars

The AllMusic reviewer concluded that, "overall, this is a highly enjoyable effort, a strong start to Anthony Wilson's career." It was nominated for a Grammy Award in the Best Large Jazz Ensemble category.

== Track listing ==
1. "Fargas Shuffle" – 6:51
2. "The Parisian Knights" – 5:59
3. "Karaoke" – 10:09
4. "Leila" – 7:02
5. "The New Fawn-Do!" – 8:29
6. "Southern Gentleman" – 9:20
7. "Pachinko" – 4:47
8. "Do Nothin' Till You Hear from Me" – 7:15
9. "Monsignor" – 7:11
10. "Remington Ride" – 6:59

== Personnel ==
- Anthony Wilson – guitar
- Carl Saunders – trumpet
- Ira Nepus – trombone
- Louis Taylor – reeds
- Pete Christlieb – tenor sax
- Jack Nimitz – baritone sax
- Brad Mehldau – piano
- Danton Boller – bass
- Willie Jones, III – drums
- Bennie Wallace – tenor sax (track 6)
