= Don Raffell =

American musician and educator(1919–2003)

- Don Raffell on far right in the Charlie Spivak sax section, 1941

Background information
- Born: Donald Howard Raffell; April 26, 1919; Washington, D.C., U.S.
- Died: March 24, 2003 (aged 83) Sherman Oaks, California
- Genres: Jazz, big band, swing
- Occupation: Musician
- Instruments: Saxophone, clarinet
- Formerly of: The Tonight Show Band

Don Raffell (born Donald Howard Raffell; Apr 26, 1919 – Mar 24, 2003) was an American saxophonist, woodwind doubler (multireedist), studio musician and educator. Raffell recorded on hundreds of records, movies, and T.V shows dating from the 1940s all the way through the 1990s. His career as a studio musician was long and stylistically diverse having started in the big band era and playing all the way up through rock n' roll and other modern pop era acts. He had a long time close professional association with arranger and conductor Nelson Riddle.

== Early life ==
Don Raffell was born and raised in a musical family in Washington D.C. where both he and his brother took up musical instruments. He learned the clarinet and then moved onto the saxophone and flute, he learned to play trumpet and flugelhorn also. Early on his greatest influence on the saxophone was Lester Young and then later Stan Getz.

== Professional career ==
Raffell got his first start with the Charlie Spivak orchestra in 1940 where he would meet long-time friend and professional colleague, trombonist and arranger Nelson Riddle. During the 1940s and early 1950s Raffell would tour and record extensively with Spivak and then later with the Artie Shaw Orchestra with whom he recorded on several of the bands famous RCA recordings. He would move to Los Angeles in the mid-1940s after the Spivak band had made an appearance on the 1944 Betty Grable movie Pin Up Girl. Raffell also toured and recorded with numerous other big bands/acts of the time to include Benny Goodman, Sonny Burke, Johnny Burke, Charlie Barnet, Louis Armstrong, Ray Conniff, and Mel Torme. His tenure with the Burke Orchestra was the most positive for him of any of the touring bands from that era. Raffell eventually settled in the city of Sherman Oaks in Los Angeles County near the studio music scene of Burbank and Hollywood.

=== Studio work and Nelson Riddle ===
Raffell moved away from touring big bands and started to work as both a reed doubler and arranger for Skitch Henderson and Les Brown in the late 1950s on The Steve Allen Show after production had moved to Los Angeles from New York in 1956. He eventually became one of the main woodwind doublers on numerous sessions for Nelson Riddle and is in the reed/saxophone section on many recordings for Capitol Records with Ella Fitzgerald, Frank Sinatra, Dean Martin, Nat King Cole, Judy Garland, Peggy Lee, Johnny Mathis, Rosemary Clooney and Keely Smith among many others. His close association with Nelson Riddle also lead him to work on TV shows such as the 1960s Batman TV series and the ABC Lennon Sisters variety hour (1969–1970), among others. Though long-time friends with Riddle, Raffell had a falling out with the arranger during studio sessions in the 1960s due to both musicians' strong personalities. Raffell played in the sax section for the Johnny Carson Tonight Show Band when it moved to NBC's Burbank studios in the late 1960s; Raffell held the tenor sax chair for a number of years eventually taken over by reedman Ernie Watts.

=== Style ===
As a jazz saxophonist Raffell's natural style was patterned after Lester Young and Stan Getz; his solos on records of Sammy Davis Jr. and Anita O'Day show this side of his playing. Raffell is also heard on early R&B, pop, rock n' roll records of groups like The Platters where he achieves sounds more like Earl Bostic with growls and scoops (barwalking saxophone) which is a complete switch from Young and Getz. Raffell's versatility as a soloist was impressive and wide ranging. He is probably most well known for his recordings for Time-Life Records where he impersonates Stan Getz and Herschel Evans. He also recorded and performed with jazz artists Gerald Wilson, Mel Torme and Nancy Wilson throughout the 1960s and Singers Unlimited during the 1970s; Raffell is on numerous Grammy nominated, winning recordings.

== As educator ==
Throughout Raffell's music career he kept a private music studio at his home in Sherman Oaks; he was well known in Los Angeles as one of the main woodwind and jazz artists to study with. Students who studied with him include David Binney, Roger Ingram, Luis Bonilla, and Jack Cooper.

== Partial discography ==
=== As sideman ===
- 1940 - 1942 All releases, Charlie Spivak
- 1946 Eastside Jump, Ray Coniff (Atomic)
- 1946 I Got the Sun in the Morning, Artie Shaw (Bluebird/RCA)
- 1946 The Mad Monk, Johnny Burke (Atomic)
- 1949 Mel Torme with Sonny Burke (Capitol)- singles
- 1951 Mambo Jambo Sonny Burke (Decca)
- 1951 Mel Torme with Hal Mooney (Musicraft)- singles
- 1951 What Does It Take/Lazy Day/Baby Doll/Lady Bug (singles), Ella Fitzgerald with Sonny Burke (Decca)
- 1953 The Progressive Mr. DeFranco (Norgran)
- 1954 Four Platters and One Lovely Dish, The Platters (Bear Family)
- 1955 Louis Armstrong with the Sonny Burke Orchestra, Louis Armstrong (Decca)
- 1956 A Swingin' Affair!, Frank Sinatra (Capitol)
- 1957 It's All Over but the Swingin', Sammy Davis Jr. (MCA)
- 1957 The Jolson Story Al Jolson and the Andrews Sisters with Vic Schoen (Decca)
- 1961 You Better Believe It!, Gerald Wilson (World Pacific)
- 1962 Moment of Truth, Gerald Wilson (World Pacific)
- 1962 Business Meetin', Carmell Jones (World Pacific)
- 1962 The Jazz Soul Of Doctor Kildare, Harry Betts (Choreo Records)
- 1965/(2000) Un-issued material The Complete Pacific Jazz: Gerald Wilson (Mosaic)
- 1967 Presenting Milton Delugg and "the Tonight Show" Big Band (RCA)
- 1971 The Swing Era: 1930-1936 (Time-Life)
- 1971 The Swing Era: 1942-1944 (Time-Life)
- 1972 The Swing Era: 1936-1945 (Time-Life)
- 1972 As You Remember Them: Great Instrumentals: Volume 1-8 (Time-Life)
- 1973 The Swing Era: Curtain Call: The Sounds Of Swing (Time-Life Records)
- 1975 Southern Memoir, Bing Crosby (Infinity)
- 1975 I Get a Kick Out of You, Anita O'Day (Evidence)
- 1976 Patty Weaver Sings..., Patty Weaver (RE/SE)
- 1977 Music from New York, New York, Bill Tole (Courtney)
- 1980 Feeling Free, Singers Unlimited (Universal)
- 1984 A Song for You, Anita O'Day (Storyville)
- 1990 Noni Bernardi Big Band - Video (NTSC Video)
- 1998 Big Band Memories, Bill Tole (Courtney)
