= Calafia (album) =

Studio album by Gerald Wilson Orchestra of the 80's
- Released: 1985
- Recorded: November 29 & 30, 1984
- Studio: Monterey Sound Studios, Glendale, CA
- Genre: Jazz
- Length: 58:34
- Label: Trend; TR-537
- Producer: Albert Marx

Gerald Wilson chronology
| Jessica (1982) | Calafia (1985) | Jenna (1989) |

Calafia is an album by Gerald Wilson's Orchestra of the 80's recorded in 1984 and released on the Trend label.

== Reception ==
Professional ratings
Review scores
| Source | Rating |
|---|---|
| AllMusic | 4/5 stars |

AllMusic rated the album with 4 stars; in his review, Scott Yanow noted: "Gerald Wilson's big band recordings were always quite consistent, featuring his distinctive arrangements and some of Los Angeles' top hard bop soloists of the era... A fine, underrated effort".

== Track listing ==
All compositions by Gerald Wilson.

1. "Prince Albert" – 6:08
2. "Calafia" – 5:20
3. "Eloy" – 5:49
4. "The Redd Foxx" – 4:38
5. "3/4 for Mayor Tom" – 6:58
6. "Viva Tirado '85" – 9:17

== Personnel ==
- Gerald Wilson – arranger, conductor
- Al Aarons, Rick Baptist, Oscar Brashear, Snooky Young –trumpet
- Garnett Brown, Buster Cooper, Thurman Green, Maurice Spears – trombone
- Red Callender tuba
- Roger Hogan, Harold Land, Anthony Ortega, John Stephens, Henry de Vega, Ernie Watts – saxophones
- Milcho Leviev – piano
- Stanley Gilbert – bass
- Paul Humphrey – drums
