= Gerald Wilson =

American jazz trumpeter (1918–2014)

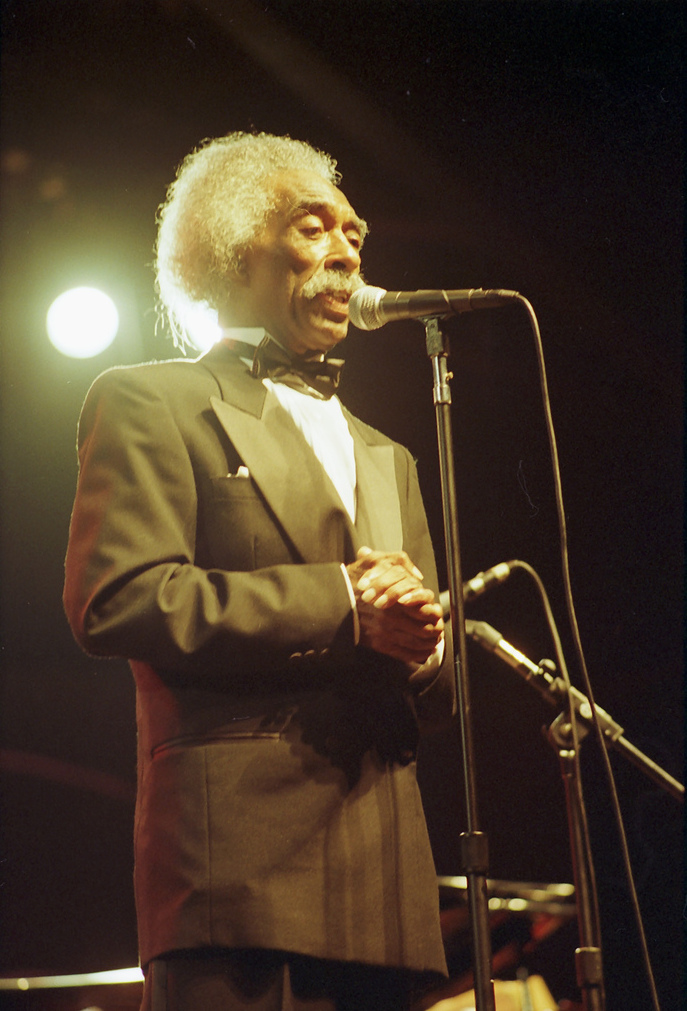
- Wilson in 2005

Background information
- Born: Gerald Stanley Wilson; September 4, 1918; Shelby, Mississippi, U.S.
- Died: September 8, 2014 (aged 96) Los Angeles, California, U.S.
- Genres: Jazz, pop
- Occupations: Musician, composer, bandleader
- Instrument: Trumpet
- Years active: 1938–2012
- Labels: Capitol, Pacific Jazz, Discovery, Mack Avenue

Gerald Stanley Wilson (September 4, 1918 – September 8, 2014) was an American jazz trumpeter, big band bandleader, composer, arranger, and educator. Born in Mississippi, he was based in Los Angeles from the early 1940s. He arranged music for Duke Ellington, Sarah Vaughan, Ray Charles, Julie London, Dizzy Gillespie, Ella Fitzgerald, Benny Carter, Lionel Hampton, Billie Holiday, Dinah Washington, and Nancy Wilson.

== Early life ==
Wilson was born in Shelby, Mississippi, and at the age of 16 moved to Detroit, Michigan, where he graduated from Cass Technical High School (one of his classmates was saxophonist Wardell Gray). He joined the Jimmie Lunceford orchestra in 1939, replacing its trumpeter and arranger, Sy Oliver. While with Lunceford, Wilson contributed songs to the band, including "Hi Spook" and "Yard-dog Mazurka", the first influenced by Ellington's recording of "Caravan" and the latter an influence on Stan Kenton's "Intermission Riff".

During World War II, Wilson also performed for a brief time with the U.S. Navy, with Clark Terry, Willie Smith and Jimmy Nottingham. Around 2005, many of the members of the band reunited as The Great Lakes Experience Big Band" with Wilson conducting. making a guest appearance at the invitation of Clark Terry. Wilson also played and arranged for the bands of Benny Carter.

== Career ==
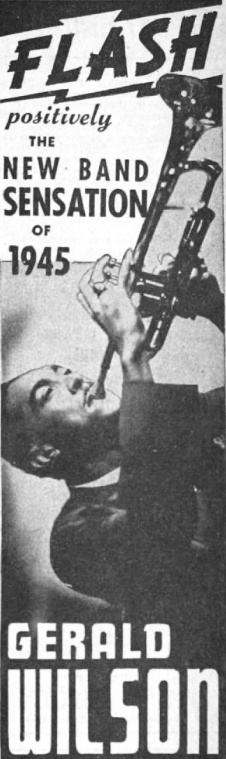
Advertisement for Gerald Wilson and His Orchestra, 1945

Wilson formed his own band, with some success in the mid-1940s. Wilson and His 20-Pc. Recording Orchestra performed at the twelfth Cavalcade of Jazz held at Wrigley Field in Los Angeles which was produced by Leon Hefflin, Sr. on September 2, 1956. Also performing that day were Dinah Washington, The Mel Williams Dots, Julie Stevens, Little Richard, Chuck Higgin's Orchestra, Willie Hayden & Five Black Birds, The Premiers, Bo Rhambo, and Jerry Gray and his Orchestra.

In 1960, he formed a Los Angeles-based band that began a series of critically acclaimed recordings for the Pacific Jazz label. His 1968 album California Soul featured a title track written by Ashford & Simpson, as well as a version of The Doors' hit "Light My Fire". Musicians in the band at various times included lead trumpeter Snooky Young, trumpet soloist Carmell Jones and saxophonists Bud Shank, Joe Maini, Harold Land, Teddy Edwards, and Don Raffell. The rhythm section included guitarist Joe Pass, Richard Holmes (organist), vibists Roy Ayers and Bobby Hutcherson, and drummers Mel Lewis and Mel Lee.

Wilson's wife of more than 50 years, Josefina Villasenor Wilson, is Mexican-American, and a number of his compositions showed his love of Spanish/Mexican themes, especially "Viva Tirado", which later became a hit for the rock band El Chicano. With his wife, Wilson had three daughters (Jeri, Lillian (Teri) and Nancy Jo), his son Anthony (who is the guitarist for Diana Krall), and a number of grandchildren, all of whom have songs composed for them—his compositions were often inspired by his family members.

Wilson continued leading bands and recording in later decades for the Discovery and MAMA labels. Recent musicians included Luis Bonilla, Rick Baptist, Randall Willis, Wilson's son-in-law Shuggie Otis and son Anthony Wilson (both guitarists); his grandson Eric Otis also played on such recordings. Wilson continued to record Spanish-flavored compositions, notably the bravura trumpet solos "Carlos" (named for Mexican matador Carlos Arruza, and recorded three times over the years, featuring trumpeters Jimmy Owens, Oscar Brashear, and Ron Barrows) and "Lomelin" (also named for a matador—Antonio Lomelin—and recorded twice, with solos by Oscar Brashear and Jon Faddis).

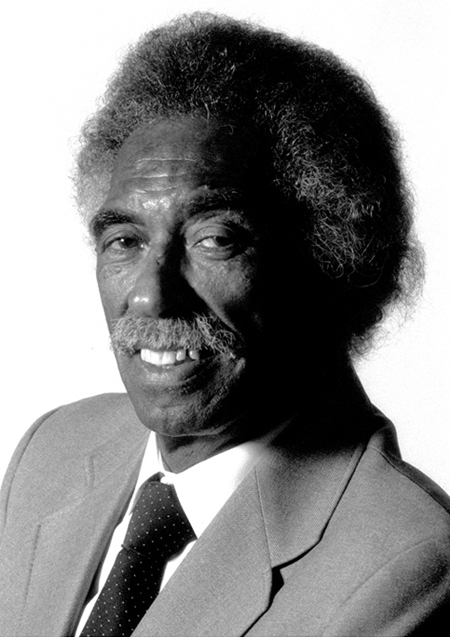
Gerald Wilson at Bach Dancing & Dynamite Society, Half Moon Bay, California, January 24, 1988

The National Endowment for the Arts named Wilson an NEA Jazz Master in 1990. In 1998 Wilson received a commission from the Monterey Jazz Festival for an original composition, resulting in "Theme for Monterey", which was performed at that year's festival. In later years, he formed orchestras on the West and East coasts, each with local outstanding musicians. He also made special appearances as guest conductor, including with the Carnegie Hall Jazz Band (now the Jon Faddis Jazz Orchestra of New York), the Lincoln Center Jazz Orchestra, the Chicago Jazz Ensemble and European radio jazz orchestras, conducting the BBC Big Band in 2005. He hosted an innovative show, in the 1970s, on KBCA in Los Angeles, which was co-hosted by Dennis Smith, where he played "...music of the past, the present, and the future."

Wilson was a member of the faculty at California State University, Los Angeles and the University of California, Los Angeles, for many years recently winning a "teacher of the year" award. In the 1970s he also served on the faculty at California State University, Northridge, where he taught Jazz History to wide acclaim among the student body, and has also taught at Cal Arts in Los Angeles.

In February 2006, Wynton Marsalis and the Lincoln Center Jazz Orchestra performed his music with Gerald Wilson conducting. He had a unique style of conducting: "Garbed in well tailored suits, his long white hair flowing, Wilson shaped the music with dynamic movements and the elegant grace of a modern dancer." Asked about his style of conducting by Terry Gross on the NPR show Fresh Air in 2006, he replied, "It's different from any style you've ever seen before. I move. I choreograph the music as I conduct. You see, I point it out, everything you're to listen to."

In June 2007, Wilson returned to the studio with producer Al Pryor and an all-star big band to record a special album of compositions commissioned and premiered at the Monterey Jazz Festival for the festival's 50th anniversary. Wilson had helped lead celebrations of the festival's 20th and 40th anniversary with his specially commissioned works (1998's Grammy-nominated album Theme for Monterey). The album Monterey Moods was released on Mack Avenue Records in September 2007. In September 2009, Wilson conducted his eight-movement suite "Detroit", commissioned by the Detroit Jazz Festival to mark its 30th anniversary. The work includes a movement entitled "Cass Tech" in honor of his high school alma mater. In 2011, his last recording was the Grammy-nominated Legacy.

== Death ==
Wilson died at his home in Los Angeles, California, on September 8, 2014, four days after his 96th birthday, after a brief illness that followed a bout of pneumonia, which had hospitalized him.

== Awards and honors ==
- 1990 NEA Jazz Masters Award
- 1996 Library of Congress Gerald Wilson archive of his life's work
- 1997 American Jazz Award: Best Arranger and Best Big Band
- 2008 Monterey Jazz Festival Jazz Legends Award
- 2012 Los Angeles County Museum of Art/Los Angeles Jazz Society L.A. Jazz Treasure Award

Grammy nominations

Year	Nominee / work	Award	Result
1963	"Tell Me the Truth" (track for Nancy Wilson)	Best Background arrangement (behind vocalists or instrumentalist)	Nominated
1964	"Paco" (track)	Best Original Jazz Composition	Nominated
1995	State Street Sweet (album)	Best Large Ensemble Jazz Performance	Nominated
1998	Theme For Monterey (album)	Best Large Ensemble Jazz Performance	Nominated
1998	"Romance" (track)	Best Instrumental Composition	Nominated
2003	New York, New Sound (album)	Best Large Ensemble Jazz Album	Nominated
2011	Legacy (album)	Best Large Ensemble Jazz Album	Nominated

Grammy Award-nominated and -winning singles or albums contributed to

Year	Grammy category	Album or Single	Primary artist	Label	Role/Content composed or arranged	Honor
1959	Best Musical Composition First Recorded and Released in 1959 (more than 5 minutes duration)	Anatomy of a Murder (Soundtrack album)	Duke Ellington	Columbia	trumpet/instrumentalist on all tracks	Won
1959	Best Sound Track Album	Anatomy of a Murder (Soundtrack album)	Duke Ellington	Columbia	trumpet/instrumentalist on all tracks	Won
1959	Best Performance by a Dance Band	Anatomy of a Murder (Soundtrack album)	Duke Ellington	Columbia	trumpet/instrumentalist on all tracks	Won
1963	Album of the Year	Modern Sounds in Country and Western Music (album)	Ray Charles	ABC-Paramount	arranger - Bye Bye Love/Just A Little Lovin'/Careless Love/Hey, Good Lookin'	Nominated
1999	Grammy Hall of Fame	Modern Sounds in Country and Western Music (album)	Ray Charles	ABC-Paramount	arranger - Bye Bye Love/Just A Little Lovin'/Careless Love/Hey, Good Lookin'	Won

== Discography ==
=== As leader ===
- 1945–46 – The Chronological Gerald Wilson and His Orchestra, 1945-46 (Classics, 1998)
- 1946–54 – The Chronological Gerald Wilson and His Orchestra, 1946-54 (Classics, 2007)
- 1950–54 – Big Band Modern (The Jazz Factory, 2006) Contains the reissue of Big Band Modern (Audio Lab, 1959) plus a bonus of seven previously unissued live tracks recorded 1950.
- 1961–69 – The Complete Pacific Jazz Recordings (Mosaic, 2000 [5-CD boxset]) Contains all ten Pacific Jazz recordings listed below.
- 1961 – You Better Believe It! (Pacific Jazz, 1961)
- 1962 – Moment of Truth (Pacific Jazz, 1962)
- 1963–64 – Portraits (Pacific Jazz, 1964)
- 1965 – On Stage (Pacific Jazz, 1965)
- 1965 – Feelin' Kinda Blues (Pacific Jazz, 1966)
- 1966 – The Golden Sword (Pacific Jazz, 1966)
- 1967 – Live and Swinging (Pacific Jazz, 1967)
- 1968 – Everywhere (Pacific Jazz, 1968)
- 1968 – California Soul (Pacific Jazz, 1968)
- 1969 – Eternal Equinox (Pacific Jazz, 1969)
- Lomelin (Discovery, 1981)
- Jessica (Trend, 1982 [1983])
- Calafia (Trend, 1984 [1985])
- Jenna (Discovery, 1989 [1990])
- State Street Sweet (MAMA Foundation/Summit, 1994)
- Suite Memories (MAMA Foundation, 1996)
- Theme for Monterey (MAMA Foundation/Summit, 1997)
- New York, New Sound (Mack Avenue, 2003)
- In My Time (Mack Avenue, 2005)
- Monterey Moods (Mack Avenue, 2007)
- Detroit (Mack Avenue, 2009)
- Legacy (Mack Avenue, 2011)

=== As co-leader/arranger ===
- 1961 – Les McCann, Les McCann Sings (Pacific Jazz, 1961)
- 1962 – Nancy Wilson, Broadway – My Way (Capitol, 1963)
- 1964 – Nancy Wilson, How Glad I Am (Capitol, 1964)
- 1964 – Les McCann & Gerald Wilson, McCann/Wilson (Pacific Jazz, 1965)
- 1965 – Julie London, Feeling Good (Liberty, 1965)
- 1965 – Sarah Vaughan, Sarah Sings Soulfully (Roulette, 1965)
- 1969 – Jean-Luc Ponty, Electric Connection (World Pacific, 1969)

=== As sideman ===
With Count Basie

- The Count (RCA Camden, 1958)
- Shoutin' Blues 1949 (Bluebird, 1993)

With Ray Charles

- Modern Sounds in Country and Western Music (ABC-Paramount, 1962) also arranger
- Modern Sounds in Country and Western Music Volume Two (ABC-Paramount, 1962) also arranger

With Buddy Collette

- Man of Many Parts (Contemporary, 1956)
- Buddy's Best (Dooto, 1958)
- Polynesia (Music & Sound, 1959)

With Curtis Counce

- Carl's Blues (Contemporary, 1960)
- Sonority (Contemporary, 1989)

With Duke Ellington

- Dance to the Duke! (Capitol, 1954)
- Anatomy of a Murder (Columbia, 1959)
- Swinging Suites by Edward E. and Edward G. (Columbia, 1960)
- Piano in the Background (Columbia, 1962)

With Jimmie Lunceford

- Lunceford Special (Columbia, 1956) reissued in 1967
- The Chronological Jimmie Lunceford & His Orchestra 1939-1940 (Classics, 1991)

With Jimmy Witherspoon

- Singin' the Blues (World Pacific, 1959)
- 'Spoon (Reprise, 1961)
- Roots (Reprise, 1962)

With others

- Kenny Burrell, 75th Birthday Bash Live! (Blue Note/EMI, 2006)
- Red Callender, The Lowest (MetroJazz, 1958)
- Bobby Darin, You're the Reason I'm Living (Capitol, 1963)
- Little Esther, Better Beware (Charly, 1990)
- Neal Hefti, Jazz Pops (Reprise, 1962)
- Carmell Jones, Business Meetin' (Pacific Jazz, 1962)
- Tricky Lofton & Carmell Jones, Brass Bag (Pacific Jazz, 1962)
- Googie Rene, Romesville! (Class, 1959)
- Leroy Vinnegar, Leroy Walks! (Contemporary, 1958)
