= Gene Harris =

American jazz pianist

Background information
- Born: Eugene Haire; September 1, 1933; Benton Harbor, Michigan, U.S.
- Died: January 16, 2000 (aged 66) Boise, Idaho, U.S.
- Genres: Jazz, blues, soul jazz
- Occupation: Musician
- Instruments: Piano, keyboards, Hammond B3
- Years active: 1955–2000
- Labels: Blue Note, Concord Jazz
- Website: www.boisestate.edu/geneharris/

Gene Harris (born Eugene Haire, September 1, 1933 – January 16, 2000) was an American jazz pianist known for his warm sound and blues and gospel-infused style, known as soul jazz.

From 1956 to 1970, he played in The Three Sounds trio with bassist Andy Simpkins and drummer Bill Dowdy. During this time, The Three Sounds recorded regularly for Blue Note and Verve Records.

Harris retired to Boise in the late 1970s, but continued to perform regularly at the Idanha Hotel. The double-bassist Ray Brown convinced him to go back on tour in the early 1980s. Harris played with the Ray Brown Trio and then led his own groups, recording mostly on Concord Records, until his death from kidney failure in 2000. The singer Niki Haris is his daughter.

== Discography ==
=== As leader/co-leader ===
Year recorded	Title	Label	Year released	Personnel/Notes
1958	Introducing the 3 Sounds	Blue Note	1959	With The Three Sounds: Andy Simpkins (bass), Bill Dowdy (drums)
1958– 1959	Bottoms Up!	Blue Note	1959	With The Three Sounds: Andy Simpkins (bass), Bill Dowdy (drums)
1959	LD + 3	Blue Note	1959	With The Three Sounds: Andy Simpkins (bass), Bill Dowdy (drums); plus Lou Donaldson (alto sax)
1959	Good Deal	Blue Note	1960	With The Three Sounds: Andy Simpkins (bass), Bill Dowdy (drums)
1960	Blue Hour	Blue Note	1961	With The Three Sounds: Andy Simpkins (bass), Bill Dowdy (drums); plus Stanley Turrentine (tenor sax)
1960	Moods	Blue Note	1961	With The Three Sounds: Andy Simpkins (bass), Bill Dowdy (drums)
1960	Feelin' Good	Blue Note	1961	With The Three Sounds: Andy Simpkins (bass), Bill Dowdy (drums)
1960	Here We Come	Blue Note	1962	With The Three Sounds: Andy Simpkins (bass), Bill Dowdy (drums)
1960	It Just Got to Be	Blue Note	1963	With The Three Sounds: Andy Simpkins (bass), Bill Dowdy (drums)
1961	Hey There	Blue Note	1962	With The Three Sounds: Andy Simpkins (bass), Bill Dowdy (drums)
1961– 1962	Babe's Blues	Blue Note	1986	With The Three Sounds: Andy Simpkins (bass), Bill Dowdy (drums)
1962	Out of This World	Blue Note	1966	With The Three Sounds: Andy Simpkins (bass), Bill Dowdy (drums)
1962	Black Orchid	Blue Note	1964	With The Three Sounds: Andy Simpkins (bass), Bill Dowdy (drums)
1959, 1962	Standards	Blue Note	1998	With The Three Sounds: Andy Simpkins (bass), Bill Dowdy (drums)
1962	Blue Genes	Verve	1963	With The Three Sounds: Andy Simpkins (bass), Bill Dowdy (drums)
1962	Anita O'Day & the Three Sounds	Verve	1963	With The Three Sounds: Andy Simpkins (bass), Bill Dowdy (drums); plus Anita O'Day (vocals)
1962	The Three Sounds Play Jazz on Broadway	Mercury	1963	With The Three Sounds: Andy Simpkins (bass), Bill Dowdy (drums)
1963	Some Like It Modern	Mercury	1963	With The Three Sounds: Andy Simpkins (bass), Bill Dowdy (drums)
1964	Live at the Living Room	Mercury	1964	With The Three Sounds: Andy Simpkins (bass), Bill Dowdy (drums); in concert
1965	Three Moods	Limelight	1965	With The Three Sounds: Andy Simpkins (bass), Bill Dowdy (drums); plus some tracks with trombones added and some with strings added, all arranged by Julian Lee
1965	Beautiful Friendship	Limelight	1965	With The Three Sounds: Andy Simpkins (bass), Bill Dowdy (drums); plus some tracks with horns or strings arranged by Julian Lee
1966	Today's Sounds	Limelight	1966	With The Three Sounds: Andy Simpkins (bass), Kalil Madi (drums); in concert
1966	Vibrations	Blue Note	1967	With The Three Sounds: Andy Simpkins (bass), Kalil Madi (drums)
1967	Live at The Lighthouse	Blue Note	1967	With The Three Sounds: Andy Simpkins (bass), Donald Bailey (drums); in concert
1968	Coldwater Flat	Blue Note	1968	With The Three Sounds: Andy Simpkins (bass), Donald Bailey (drums); plus Oliver Nelson Orchestra
1968	Elegant Soul	Blue Note	1968	With The Three Sounds: Andy Simpkins (bass), Carl Burnett (drums); plus orchestra
1969	Soul Symphony	Blue Note	1969	With The Three Sounds: Henry Franklin (bass), Carl Burnett (drums); plus orchestra
1970	Live at the 'It Club'	Blue Note	1996	With The Three Sounds: Henry Franklin (bass), Carl Burnett (drums); in concert
1970	Live at the 'It Club' Volume 2	Blue Note	2000	With The Three Sounds: Henry Franklin (bass), Carl Burnett (drums); in concert
1971	The 3 Sounds	Blue Note	1971	With Monk Higgins (organ), Fred Robinson and Albert Vescovo (guitar), Luther Hughes (electric bass), Carl Burnett (drums), Bobbye Porter Hall (conga), Paul Humphrey (percussion); plus unknown (vocals)
1972	Gene Harris of the Three Sounds	Blue Note	1972	With Sam Brown and Cornell Dupree (guitar), Ron Carter (bass), Freddie Waits (drums), Johnny Rodriguez (conga), Omar Clay (percussion, vibes)
1973	Yesterday, Today & Tomorrow	Blue Note	1973	Trio, with Johnny Hatton (bass, electric bass), Carl Burnett (drums, percussion)
1974	Astral Signal	Blue Note	1975	With various personnel (see listing's page)
1975	Nexus	Blue Note	1975	With various personnel (see listing's page)
1976	In a Special Way	Blue Note	1976	With various personnel (see listing's page)
1977	Tone Tantrum	Blue Note	1977	With various personnel (see listing's page)
1981	Live at Otter Crest	Jazzizz; Bosco; Concord	1981	Trio, with John Heard (bass), Jimmie Smith (drums); in concert
1982	Hot Lips	JAM	1982	Quartet, with Ron Escheté (guitar), John Heard (bass), Jimmie Smith (drums)
1984?	Nature's Way	JAM	1984	Quartet, with Ron Escheté (guitar), Luther Hughes (bass), Paul Humphrey (drums)
1985	The Gene Harris Trio Plus One	Concord	1986	Quartet, with Ray Brown (bass), Mickey Roker (drums), plus Stanley Turrentine (tenor sax); in concert
1987	Tribute to Count Basie	Concord	1988	With big band (Gene Harris All Star Big Band)
1989?	Listen Here!	Concord	1989	Quartet, with Ron Escheté (guitar), Ray Brown (bass), Jeff Hamilton (drums)
1989	Live at Town Hall, N.Y.C.	Concord	1989	With big band (Philip Morris Superband); in concert
1990	At Last with Scott Hamilton	Concord	1990	Quintet, with Scott Hamilton (tenor sax), Herb Ellis (guitar), Ray Brown (bass), Harold Jones (drums)
1990	World Tour 1990	Concord	1991	With big band (Philip Morris Superband); in concert
1991	Black and Blue	Concord	1991	Quartet, with Ron Escheté (guitar), Luther Hughes (bass), Harold Jones (drums)
1992	Like a Lover	Concord	1992	Quartet, with Ron Escheté (guitar), Luther Hughes (bass), Harold Jones (drums)
1992	Gene Harris at Maybeck	Concord	1993	Solo piano; in concert
1992	Brotherhood	Concord	1995	Quartet, with Ron Escheté (guitar), Luther Hughes (bass), Paul Humphrey (drums)
1993?	A Little Piece of Heaven	Concord	1993	Quartet, with Ron Escheté (guitar), Luther Hughes (bass), Paul Humphrey (drums); in concert
1994?	Funky Gene's	Concord	1994	Quartet, with Ron Escheté (guitar), Luther Hughes (bass), Paul Humphrey (drums)
1995	It's the Real Soul	Concord	1996	Quintet, with Ron Escheté (guitar), Luther Hughes (bass), Paul Humphrey (drums), plus Frank Wess (tenor sax, flute); in concert
1996?	In His Hands	Concord	1997	With Jack McDuff (organ), Ron Escheté (guitar), Luther Hughes (bass), Paul Humphrey (drums); plus Niki Haris and Curtis Stigers (vocals)
1996?	Down Home Blues	Concord	1997	With Jack McDuff (organ), Ron Escheté (guitar), Luther Hughes (bass), Paul Humphrey (drums); plus Niki Haris and Curtis Stigers (vocals)
1996	Live in London	Resonance	2008	Quartet, with Jim Mullen (guitar), Andrew Cleyndert (bass), Martin Drew (drums); in concert
1996	Another Night in London	Resonance	2010	Quartet, with Jim Mullen (guitar), Andrew Cleyndert (bass), Martin Drew (drums); in concert
1998?	Live with The Philip Morris All-Stars	Concord	1998	With Sweets Edison (trumpet), Stanley Turrentine (tenor sax), Kenny Burrell (guitar); plus Ernie Andrews (vocals)
1998	Alley Cats	Concord	1999	With Ernie Watts (tenor sax, alto sax), Red Holloway (tenor sax), Jack McDuff (organ), Frank Potenza (guitar), Luther Hughes (bass), Paul Kreibich (drums); plus Niki Haris (vocals); in concert

Compilations

- The Best of The Three Sounds (with The Three Sounds) (Blue Note, 1993)
- Gene Harris: The Concord Jazz Heritage Series (Concord, 1998)
- The Blue Note Years (with The Three Sounds) (Blue Note, 1999)
- Gene Harris: The Best of the Concord Years (Concord, 2000)[2CD]
- The Complete Blue Hour Sessions (The Three Sounds with Stanley Turrentine) (Blue Note, 2000)[2CD]
- Big Band Soul (with the Gene Harris Superband) (Concord, 2002)[2CD] – contains Live At Town Hall, N.Y.C. + World Tour 1990
- Swingin' the Blues (Recall, 2002)[2CD]
- Ballad Essentials (Concord, 2003)
- Live From New York To Tokyo (with the Ray Brown Trio) (Concord, 2003)[2CD] – live contains The Red Hot Ray Brown Trio + Bam Bam Bam
- Instant Party (Concord, 2004)

=== As a member ===
- The Blue Note All-Stars, Blue Note Live at The Roxy (Blue Note, 1976) – live
- Concord Jazz All Stars, The 20th Concord Festival All-Stars (Concord, 1988)

=== As sideman ===
With The Ray Brown Trio

- Soular Energy (Concord, 1985) – rec. 1984
- Don't Forget the Blues (Concord, 1986)
- The Red Hot Ray Brown Trio (Concord, 1987) – live rec. 1985 at the Blue Note
- Bam Bam Bam (Concord, 1989) – live at the Fujitsu-Concord Jazz Festival
- Black Orpheus (Evidence, 1989)
- Mr. Blue (Denon, 1989) – also with Takashi Ohi
- Summer Wind: Live at The Loa (Concord, 1990) – live rec. 1988
- Moore Makes 4 (Concord, 1990) – also with Ralph Moore
- Three Dimensional (Concord, 1991)
- Georgia on My Mind (All Art [Japan], 1991)

With others

- Nat Adderley, Branching Out (Riverside, 1958)
- James Clay, A Double Dose of Soul (Riverside, 1960)
- Melvin Rhyne, Organ-izing (Jazzland, 1960)
- various artists, 'S Wonderful: Concord Jazz Salutes Ira Gershwin (Concord, 1979)
- Milt Jackson Quartet, Soul Route (Pablo, 1984) – rec. 1983
- Ernestine Anderson, When the Sun Goes Down (Concord, 1984)
- Benny Carter, A Gentleman and His Music (Concord, 1985)
- Junko Mine, Love Me Tender (All Art [Japan], 1986)
- B.B. King, Live at The Apollo (GRP, 1990) – live
- various artists, Concord Jazz Festival: Live 1990 (Concord, 1990) – live
- various artists, Concord Jazz Festival: Live 1990, Third Set (Concord, 1990) – live
- various artists, A Concord Jazz Christmas (Concord, 1991)
- various artists, Jazz Celebration: Tribute to Carl Jefferson (Concord, 1992)
- various artists, Fujitsu-Concord 25th Jazz Festival (Concord, 1993)
- various artists, Fujitsu-Concord 26th Jazz Festival (Concord, 1994)
- Mary Stallings, I Waited for You (Concord, 1994)
- Frank Wess, It's the Real Soul (Concord, 1996)
- Jack McDuff, Down Home Blues (Concord, 1997)
- Niki Haris, Dreaming A Dream (BMG, 1997)
- Marian McPartland, Just Friends (Concord, 1998)

== Honors ==
- The Gene Harris bandshell in Boise's Ann Morrison park is named in his honor.
- The Gene Harris Jazz Festival is an annual event in Boise that brings together the best of Boise jazz and education in memory of the city's most famous jazz musician.
