= Branching Out =

Studio album by Nat Adderley
- Released: December 1958
- Recorded: September 1958
- Studio: Reeves Sound Studios, New York City
- Genre: Jazz
- Length: 39:52
- Label: Riverside; RLP 12-285
- Producer: Orrin Keepnews

Nat Adderley chronology
To the Ivy League from Nat (1956)	Branching Out (1958)	Much Brass (1956)

The Three Sounds chronology
Introducing the 3 Sounds (1958)	Branching Out (1958)	Bottoms Up! (1959)

Branching Out is an album by jazz cornetist Nat Adderley, released on the Riverside label and featuring performances by Adderley with Johnny Griffin, and the Three Sounds.

== Reception ==
The AllMusic review by Scott Yanow states: "Adderley and Griffin made for an exciting frontline". The Penguin Guide to Jazz states: "Branching Out is an attractive enough set, but Griff doesn't seem the right saxophone-player for the gig, too noisy and rapid-fire".

Professional ratings
Review scores
Source	Rating
AllMusic	4/5 stars
The Penguin Guide to Jazz	3/4 stars

== Track listing ==
All compositions by Nat Adderley except as indicated

1. "Sister Caroline" - 5:51
2. "Well, You Needn't" (Thelonious Monk) - 8:26
3. "Don't Get Around Much Anymore" (Duke Ellington, Bob Russell) - 4:36
4. "I Got Plenty O' Nuttin'" (George Gershwin, Ira Gershwin, DuBose Heyward) - 5:02
5. "Branching Out" (Harold Mabern) - 6:50
6. "I Never Knew I Could Love Anybody (Like I'm Loving You)" (Raymond B. Egan, Roy Marsh, Thomas Pitts) - 4:44
7. "Warm Blue Stream" (Sara Cassey, Dotty Wayne) - 4:23

== Personnel ==
- Nat Adderley – cornet
- Johnny Griffin - tenor saxophone
- Gene Harris - piano
- Andy Simpkins - bass
- Bill Dowdy - drums
