= The 3 Sounds (album) =

Studio album by Gene Harris
- Released: 1971
- Recorded: July 26–27 and August 3, 1971
- Genre: Jazz
- Length: 36:48
- Label: Blue Note
- Producer: George Butler

Gene Harris chronology
Live at the 'It Club' (1970)	The 3 Sounds (1971)	Gene Harris of the Three Sounds (1972)

The 3 Sounds is an album by American pianist Gene Harris recorded in 1971 and released on the Blue Note label. Although it is titled after Harris' group The Three Sounds, the album is a transitional effort. Carl Burnett, the drummer from The Three Sounds, is present. Making his first appearance with Harris is bassist Luther Hughes, who would become the regular bassist of the Gene Harris Quartet in the 1990s.

== Reception ==
The Allmusic review awarded the album 3 stars.

Professional ratings
Review scores
Source	Rating
Allmusic	3/5 stars

== Track listing ==
All tracks are written by Monk Higgins except as indicated.

No.	Title	Writer(s)	Length
1.	"I'm Leaving"		5:30
2.	"Your Love Is Just Too Much"		2:44
3.	"Did You Think"		3:28
4.	"Put on Train"		5:50
5.	"You Got to Play the Game"		5:40
6.	"What's the Answer"		3:32
7.	"Eleanor Rigby"	John Lennon, Paul McCartney	6:52
8.	"Hey Girl"		3:12

- Recorded at United Artists Studios, West Hollywood, California on July 26 (tracks 1–3, 6 & 8), July 27 (tracks 4 & 5) and August 3 (track 7), 1971.

== Personnel ==
- Gene Harris - piano
- Monk Higgins - organ, arranger
- Fred Robinson, Albert Vescovo - guitar
- Luther Hughes - electric bass
- Carl Burnett - drums
- Bobbye Porter Hall - conga
- Paul Humphrey - percussion
- Unidentified vocals
