= Hey There (album) =

Studio album by The Three Sounds
- Released: 1962
- Recorded: August 13, 1961
- Studio: Van Gelder Studio, Englewood Cliffs, NJ
- Genre: Jazz
- Length: 35:46; 78:03 (SHM-CD)
- Label: Blue Note; BST 84102
- Producer: Alfred Lion

The Three Sounds chronology
Blue Hour (1960)	Hey There (1962)	Babe's Blues (1961-62)

Hey There is an album by jazz group The Three Sounds featuring performances recorded in 1961 and released on the Blue Note label. In March 2015, it was released for the first time on SHM-CD in Japan, featuring all the pieces recorded at an August 13, 1961 session, including the previously unissued "Billy Boy" and the tracks from Babe's Blues (except for "Babe's Blues", recorded in 1962 and included on the SHM-CD of Black Orchid).

== Reception ==
The Allmusic review by Stephen Thomas Erlewine awarded the album 3 stars stating "Hey There! finds the Three Sounds keeping themselves slightly in check, turning in snappy, concise versions of jazz and pop standards, as well as jumping originals from Gene Harris... Their technical prowess is better heard on records where they stretch out a bit more, but Hey There! is another artist record from the most consistently entertaining artist on Blue Note's roster".

Professional ratings
Review scores
Source	Rating
Allmusic	3/5 stars

== Track listing ==
1. "Sermonette" (Cannonball Adderley, Jon Hendricks)
2. "You Are My Sunshine" (Jimmie Davis, Charles Mitchell)
3. "Little Girl Blue" (Lorenz Hart, Richard Rodgers)
4. "Dap's Groove" (Gene Harris)
5. "Hey There" (Richard Adler, Jerry Ross)
6. "Nothin' But the Blues" (Gene Harris)
7. "Stompin' at the Savoy" (Benny Goodman, Andy Razaf, Edgar Sampson, Chick Webb)
8. "Street of Dreams" (Sam M. Lewis, Victor Young)
9. "The Masquerade Is Over" (Herbert Magidson, Allie Wrubel)

=== 2015 Japanese SHM-CD ===
1. "Sermonette" - 3:05
2. "You Are My Sunshine" - 3:05
3. "Little Girl Blue" - 5:19
4. "Dap's Groove" - 3:18
5. "Hey There" - 3:21
6. "Nothin' But the Blues" - 5:02
7. "Stompin' at the Savoy" - 4:55
8. "Street of Dreams" - 3:17
9. "The Masquerade Is Over" - 4:24
10. "Billy Boy" (Traditional) - 4:14
11. "Wait a Minute" (Gene Harris) - 2:18
12. "Work Song" (Nat Adderley) - 3:23
13. "Blue Daniel" (Gene Harris) - 3:46
14. "Sweet and Lovely" (Gus Arnheim, H. Tobias, Jules LeMare) - 7:25
15. "Shiny Stockings" (Frank Foster) - 3:14
16. "Walking the Floor Over You" (Ernest Tubb) - 2:47
17. "Between the Devil and the Deep Blue Sea" (Harold Arlen, Ted Koehler) - 3:37
18. "Stairway to the Stars" (Matty Malneck, Mitchell Parish, Frank Signorelli) - 6:41
19. "Lazy Cat" (Gene Harris) - 4:52

== Personnel ==
- Gene Harris - piano
- Andrew Simpkins - bass
- Bill Dowdy - drums
