= Live at the Lighthouse (The Three Sounds album) =

Live album by The Three Sounds
- Released: November 1967
- Recorded: June 9–10, 1967
- Venue: Lighthouse Club, Hermosa Beach, CA
- Genre: Jazz
- Length: 67:18
- Label: Blue Note
- Producer: Dick Bock

The Three Sounds chronology
Vibrations (1966)	Live at the Lighthouse (1967)	Coldwater Flat (1967)

Live at the Lighthouse is a live album by jazz group The Three Sounds featuring performances recorded in 1967 at the Lighthouse Club in California and released on the Blue Note label.

== Reception ==
The Allmusic review by Stephen Thomas Erlewine awarded the album 4 stars stating "The music on Live at the Lighthouse is hotter than some of their studio recordings, pulsating with energy and good feelings, demonstrating that they had worked out any of the problems that hampered Vibrations. It's their finest set since Black Orchid". The All About Jazz review by C. Andrew Hovan stated "Live at the Lighthouse captures The Three Sounds at or near their peak and in one of only three live performances ever caught on tape. Let's cherish it".

Professional ratings
Review scores
Source	Rating
Allmusic	4/5 stars

== Track listing ==
All compositions by Gene Harris except as indicated

1. "Still I'm Sad" (Jim McCarty, Paul Samwell-Smith) - 2:53
2. "Crying Time" (Buck Owens) - 2:31
3. "June Night (Just Give Me a June Night, the Moonlight and You)" (Abel Baer, Cliff Friend) - 7:08
4. "I Thought About You" (Johnny Mercer, Jimmy Van Heusen) - 5:54
5. "I Held My Head in Shame" - 2:56
6. "Summertime" (George Gershwin, Ira Gershwin, DuBose Heyward) - 4:58
7. "Makin' Bread Again" - 3:44
8. "Here's That Rainy Day" (Johnny Burke, Van Heusen) - 4:30
9. "Blues March" (Benny Golson) - 3:50
10. "Takin' It Easy" - 2:15 Bonus track on CD reissue
11. "Drown in My Own Tears" (Henry Glover) - 3:35 Bonus track on CD reissue
12. "Why (Am I Treated So Bad)" (Roebuck Staples) - 2:59 Bonus track on CD reissue
13. "Never Say Yes" (Nat Adderley) - 7:17 Bonus track on CD reissue
14. "River Shallow" (André Previn, Dory Previn) - 4:15 Bonus track on CD reissue
15. "Sunny" (Bobby Hebb) - 4:25 Bonus track on CD reissue
16. "Bad, Bad Whiskey" (Maxwell Davis, Amos Milburn) - 2:01 Bonus track on CD reissue
17. "C Jam Blues" (Barney Bigard, Duke Ellington) - 2:07 Bonus track on CD reissue

- Recorded at the Lighthouse Club in Hermosa Beach, California on June 9 & 10, 1967

== Personnel ==
- Gene Harris - piano, organ
- Andrew Simpkins - bass
- Donald Bailey - drums
