= Send In the Clowns (1981 Sarah Vaughan album) =

Send in the Clowns

Studio album by Sarah Vaughan
- Released: 1981
- Recorded: February 16–17, May 16, 1981
- Studio: Group IV Recording Studio, Hollywood, California
- Genre: Vocal jazz
- Length: 39:51
- Label: Pablo Today
- Producer: Norman Granz

Sarah Vaughan chronology
Songs of the Beatles (1981)	Send in the Clowns (1981)	Crazy and Mixed Up (1982)

Send in the Clowns is a 1981 studio album by Sarah Vaughan, accompanied by the Count Basie Orchestra.

This was Vaughan's third album with the Count Basie Orchestra, her previous two were No Count Sarah (1958) and Count Basie/Sarah Vaughan (1961).

== Reception ==
Professional ratings
Review scores
Source	Rating
AllMusic	3/5 stars
The Rolling Stone Jazz Record Guide	4/5 stars

The AllMusic review by Scott Yanow said that it was an "enjoyable date...the arrangements by Sammy Nestico and Allyn Ferguson unfortunately do not leave much room for any of the Basie sidemen to solo, but Sassy is in superb form".

== Track listing ==
1. "I Gotta Right to Sing the Blues" (Harold Arlen, Ted Koehler) - 5:04
2. "Just Friends" (John Klenner, Sam M. Lewis) - 3:23
3. "If You Could See Me Now" (Tadd Dameron, Carl Sigman) - 4:50
4. "Ill Wind" (Arlen, Koehler) - 4:01
5. "When Your Lover Has Gone" (Einar Aaron Swan) - 2:38
6. "Send in the Clowns" (Stephen Sondheim) - 6:22
7. "I Hadn't Anyone Till You" (Ray Noble) - 4:08
8. "All the Things You Are" (Oscar Hammerstein II, Jerome Kern) - 3:50
9. "Indian Summer" (Al Dubin, Victor Herbert) - 3:31
10. "From This Moment On" (Cole Porter) - 2:32

== Personnel ==
- Sarah Vaughan - vocals
- Andy Simpkins - double bass
- George Gaffney - piano
- Sammy Nestico, Allyn Ferguson - arranger
- The Count Basie Orchestra:
- Bobby Plater, Danny Turner - alto saxophone
- Eric Dixon, Kenny Hing - tenor saxophone
- Johnny Williams - baritone saxophone
- Sonny Cohn, Willie Cook, Frank Szabo, Bob Summers, Dale Carley - trumpet
- Mitchell "Bootie" Wood, Dennis Wilson, Grover Mitchell - trombone
- Bill Hughes - bass trombone
- Freddie Green - guitar
- Harold Jones - drums
