= Gene Harris of the Three Sounds =

Studio album by Gene Harris
- Released: 1972
- Recorded: June 29–30, 1972
- Studio: A&R Studios, New York City
- Genre: Jazz-funk
- Label: Blue Note
- Producer: Wade Marcus

Gene Harris chronology
The 3 Sounds (1971)	Gene Harris of the Three Sounds (1972)	Yesterday, Today & Tomorrow (1973)

Gene Harris of the Three Sounds is an album by American pianist Gene Harris recorded in 1972 and released on the Blue Note label. Although the title refers to Harris' group The Three Sounds the album is usually recognised as a solo effort as none of the other original members of the group participated in the recording.

== Reception ==
The Allmusic review awarded the album 2½ stars.

Professional ratings
Review scores
Source	Rating
Allmusic	2.5/5 stars

== Track listing ==
1. "Django" (John Lewis)
2. "Lean on Me" (Bill Withers)
3. "A Day in the Life of a Fool" (Luiz Bonfá, Carl Sigman)
4. "John Brown's Body" (Traditional; arranged by Wade Marcus)
5. "Listen Here" (Eddie Harris)
6. "Emily" (Johnny Mandel, Johnny Mercer)
7. "Killer Joe" (Benny Golson)
8. "C Jam Blues" (Barney Bigard, Duke Ellington)

- Recorded at A&R Studios in New York City on June 29 (tracks 1, 3 & 4) and June 30 (tracks 2 & 5-7), 1972.

== Personnel ==
Musicians

- Gene Harris - piano
- Sam Brown, Cornell Dupree - guitar
- Ron Carter - bass
- Freddie Waits - drums
- Johnny Rodriguez - conga
- Omar Clay - percussion, vibes
- Wade Marcus - arranger

Production

- George Butler - executive producer
- Don Hahn - recording
