= Here We Come =

Here We Come may refer to:

- Here We Come (A1 album), 1999
- Here We Come (The Three Sounds album), 1960
- "Here We Come" (song), 1998 single by Timbaland
- "Here We Come", a song on the album Irv Gotti Presents: The Inc.
- "Here We Come", a song by Mondo Generator from the 2003 album A Drug Problem That Never Existed
