= Another Night in London =

1996 live album by Gene Harris

Live album by Gene Harris
- Released: 2010
- Recorded: May 1996
- Genre: Jazz
- Label: Resonance Records

Gene Harris chronology
Live in London (2008)	Another Night in London (2010)

Another Night in London is a live jazz album recorded in 1996 by pianist Gene Harris. It was released in 2010 on the Resonance Records label as a follow-up to their best-selling album of 2008 Live in London.

== Track listing ==
1. "Sweet Georgia Brown"
2. "Meditation"
3. "That's All"
4. "Oh, Lady Be Good"
5. "This Masquerade"
6. "Georgia On My Mind"

== Personnel ==
- Gene Harris - Piano
- Jim Mullen - Guitar
- Andrew Cleyndert - Bass
- Martin Drew - Drums
