= Look Out! (Stanley Turrentine album) =

Studio album by Stanley Turrentine
- Released: November 1960
- Recorded: June 18, 1960
- Genre: Jazz
- Length: 54:21
- Label: Blue Note 4039
- Producer: Alfred Lion

Stanley Turrentine chronology
Stan "The Man" Turrentine (1960)	Look Out! (1960)	Blue Hour (1960)

Professional ratings
Review scores
Source	Rating
Allmusic	4.5/5 stars

Look Out! is an album by jazz saxophonist Stanley Turrentine featuring his earliest recordings as a leader on the Blue Note label performed by Turrentine with Horace Parlan, George Tucker and Al Harewood.

== Reception ==
The Allmusic review by Steve Leggett awarded the album 4½ stars and states "Although he is best known for his bluesy soul-jazz outings, tenor saxophonist Stanley Turrentine's first Blue Note session as a leader was a much more traditional bop affair, and the resulting album... shows as much artful restraint as it does groove. Not that this is a bad thing, since it allows Turrentine's big, clear tone to shine through in all its muscular sweetness, giving Look Out! a wonderful and flowing coherence".

== Track listing ==
All compositions by Stanley Turrentine except as indicated

1. "Look Out" - 7:07
2. "Journey into Melody" (Robert Farnon) - 4:52
3. "Return Engagement" (Horace Parlan) - 4:40
4. "Little Sheri" - 7:46
5. "Tiny Capers" (Clifford Brown) - 4:56
6. "Minor Chant" - 6:17

Bonus tracks on CD reissue in 1987:

7. "Little Sheri" [45 Version] - 5:36
8. "Tin Tin Deo" (Gil Fuller, Chano Pozo) - 6:15
9. "Yesterdays" (Jerome Kern, Otto Harbach) - 6:52

- Recorded at Van Gelder Studio, Englewood Cliffs, NJ on June 18, 1960.

== Personnel ==
- Stanley Turrentine - tenor saxophone
- Horace Parlan - piano
- George Tucker - bass
- Al Harewood - drums

=== Production ===
- Alfred Lion - producer
- Reid Miles - design
- Rudy Van Gelder - engineer
- Francis Wolff - photography
