= Pierce Street Jazz =

Unique jazz music series in Southern California

Pierce Street Jazz (PSJ) is a free, straight-ahead jazz concert series held on the campus of La Sierra University in Riverside, California, United States.

== History ==
The origin of PSJ at La Sierra University can be traced to the summer of 2009 when the director of the summer program and the university provost invited Henry “The Skipper” Franklin, a local bass player, to organize an ensemble for a few concerts in the campus Student Center. Franklin agreed, invited a pianist and drummer to join him in a trio, and, with guest soloists, delivered several performances.

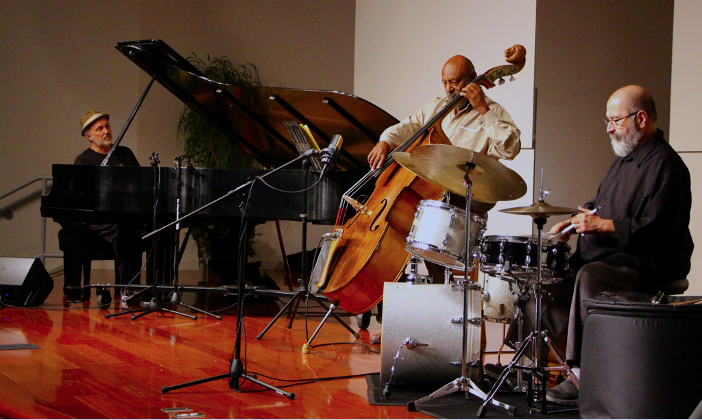
PSJ Trio: Saunders, Franklin, Bando

After the summer events, the director and provost persuaded Franklin to continue the concerts, called PSJ, in the Alumni Center, located on Pierce Street. With several, free Wednesday evening concerts each quarter, PSJ continued in this venue for over four years. By 2013 having outgrown the Alumni Center, PSJ moved to the Troesh Conference Center in the Zapara School of Business, its loctation ever since.

In time, Franklin developed a de facto house trio with Theo Saunders on piano and Ramon Banda on drums. After Banda's death in 2019, Marvin “Smitty” Smith or Yayo Morales have usually filled that role. These musicians and many of the guest soloists have regularly performed in the Friday night jazz events at the Los Angeles County Museum of Art (LACMA) in Los Angeles.

== Guest Soloists ==
Over the years, the trio has hosted many regional and national soloists, including the following selection:

- Fuasi Abdul-Khaliq (saxophone)
- Bob Boss (guitar)
- Bobby Bradford (trumpet)
- Gilbert Castellanos (trumpet)
- Carol Chaikin (saxophone)
- Mayuto Correa (percussion)
- Mon David (vocal)
- Dale Fielder (saxophone)
- Gary Foster (saxophone)
- Holly Hofmann (flute)
- Rumi Inoue (flute)
- Azar Lawrence (saxophone)
- Nick Mancini (vibraphone)
- Chuck Manning (saxophone)
- Barbara Morrison (vocal)
- Charles Owens (saxophone)
- John Payne (guitar)
- Ron Stout (trumpet)
- Justin Thomas (vibraphone)
- Dwight Trible (vocal)
- Louis Van Taylor (saxophone)
- Javier Vergara (saxophone)
- Doug Webb (saxophone)
- Sherry Williams (vocal)
- Teodross Avery (saxophone)

== Importance ==
In a region where straight-ahead jazz music was once popular, PSJ helps to preserve this musical genre in Riverside, while introducing it to students. Local and regional media not only acknowledge this but also carry notices of the events, e.g., The Press-Enterprise of Riverside; the City of Riverside; KSGN radio; performing arts LIVE; City News Group; WAVY; Hipster Sanctuary; Redlands Community News; Jazz Clubs; Jazz Near You; and Spectrum magazine.

== See also ==
- Vinny Golia (woodwinds)
- Jacques Lesure (guitar)
- Phil Ranelin (trombone)
- Nolan Shaheed (trumpet and flugelhorn)
- Rickey Woodard (saxophone)
