= Live at the Living Room =

Live album by The Three Sounds
- Released: 1964
- Recorded: 1964
- Venue: The Living Room, Cincinnati, OH
- Genre: Jazz
- Length: 39:46
- Label: Mercury; MG 20921/SR 60921
- Producer: Quincy Jones

The Three Sounds chronology
| Some Like It Modern (1963) | Live at the Living Room (1964) | Three Moods (1965) |

Live at the Living Room is a live album by The Three Sounds which was recorded in Cincinnati in 1964 and released on the Mercury label.

== Reception ==
Professional ratings
Review scores
| Source | Rating |
|---|---|
| AllMusic | 3/5 stars |

Allmusic's Scott Yanow noted, "This Mercury LP finds the trio mostly sticking to bluesy material, plus a couple of Oscar Peterson tunes ... every song sounds a bit like the blues on this hard-to-find set".

== Track listing ==
All compositions by Gene Harris except where noted

1. "Mississippi Mud" (Harry Barris) − 2:28
2. "Once in a Lifetime" (Anthony Newley, Leslie Bricusse) − 2:42
3. "Hymn to Freedom" (Oscar Peterson, Harriett Hamilton) − 3:46
4. "Glory of Love" − 4:05
5. "Blues for My Baby" − 4:20
6. "Green's" − 3:15
7. "Blues" − 5:44
8. "Willow Weep for Me" (Ann Ronell) − 6:25
9. "Blues for Big Scotia" (Peterson) − 3:01

== Personnel ==
- Gene Harris − piano
- Andy Simpkins − bass
- Bill Dowdy − drums
