= George Gaffney =

American jazz pianist

George Gaffney (c.1941 – December 4, 2002) was an American jazz pianist, noted as an accompanist for vocalists. Gaffney listed Bud Powell, Horace Silver, Bill Evans, Tommy Flanagan and Hank Jones as his major influences. Gaffney said of his playing that "...in each solo, you can play a line or a chord that has the effect of pulling the carpet out from under the listener, that will give some deeper emotional meaning to it all."

== Life ==
Born in New York City, Gaffney started studying the piano at the age of 10, but played the trombone by time he entered the United States Marine Corps in 1958. Gaffney left the Marines in 1961, and resumed playing the piano on his return to New York. Gaffney became noted as a backer and arranger for Jazz vocalists, and moved to the Chicago area in the late 1960s. It was during the 1960s that Gaffney first met Jazz vocalist Sarah Vaughan, when he was musical director of the Playboy Club in Lake Geneva, Wisconsin.

Gaffney moved to California in the early 1970s and began to work as a studio musician and accompanist. Working in television, his most notable musical work was for Moonlighting starring Bruce Willis and Cybill Shepherd. For his work on Moonlighting he was twice nominated for the Primetime Emmy Award for Outstanding Musical Direction.

Gaffney served as Sarah Vaughan's accompanist and musical director from 1980 to 1990, the last decade of Vaughan's life. He said of working Vaughan that it was like "soaring with the eagles...She allowed complete musical freedom, given the context. You can hear her on record, but to really hear her, you had to sit next to her on the piano bench, feel the floor vibrate as she sang, hear her fill the room."

After Vaughan's death he worked as Engelbert Humperdinck's musical director in Las Vegas, and as an orchestrator for Rita Moreno. Gaffney also accompanied Peggy Lee, Carmen McRae, Buddy Greco and Ernie Andrews.

Gaffney died from complications from a stroke in Los Angeles in 2002. He is survived by three children and five grandchildren.

== Discography ==
With Marlena Shaw

- Marlena Shaw Live at Montreux (Live, Blue Note Records, 1973)

With Sarah Vaughan

- Gershwin Live! (With the Los Angeles Philharmonic, live, CBS, 1982)
- Send in the Clowns (With the Count Basie Orchestra, Pablo Records, 1981)
