= The Planet Is Alive...Let It Live! =

The Planet Is Alive...Let it Live!

Studio album by Sarah Vaughan
- Released: June 30, 1984
- Recorded: 1984
- Studio: Tonhalle Düsseldorf, Düsseldorf
- Genre: Vocal jazz
- Length: 38:46
- Label: Kokopelli

Sarah Vaughan chronology
Gershwin Live! (1982)	The Planet Is Alive...Let it Live! (1984)	Brazilian Romance (1987)

The Planet Is Alive...Let it Live! is a 1984 studio album by Sarah Vaughan, of the poetry of Pope John Paul II translated by Gene Lees.

In 1995 the album was reissued on CD as The Mystery of Man.

== Reception ==
Professional ratings
Review scores
Source	Rating
Allmusic	1.5/5 stars

The AllMusic review by Scott Yanow awarded the album one and a half stars and said that:

"Unfortunately, despite the best efforts of everyone involved, the results often sound rather ponderous...The best pieces are the two original ones by Lees ("The Mystery of Man" and "Let It Live") but otherwise this is a difficult set to sit through, not only from the jazz standpoint (the impressive all-stars who are in the orchestra are largely wasted) but musically; everything is too serious and a bit pompous. Skip."

== Track listing ==
1. "The Mystery of Man" (Francy Boland, Gene Lees) - 4:08
2. "The Mystery of Man" - 0:48
3. "The Actor" (Tito Fontana, Sante Palumbo, Karol Wojtyla) - 3:56
4. "The Mystery of Man" - 0:26
5. "Girl Disappointed in Love" (Fontana, Palumbo, Wojtyla) - 4:24
6. "The Mystery of Man" - 1:09
7. "The Madeleine" (Fontana, Palumbo, Wojtyla) - 2:10
8. "The Mystery of Man" (Chorus and Instrumental) - 3:15
9. "The Black" (Fontana, Palumbo, Wojtyla) - 2:58
10. "The Mystery of Man" - 0:48
11. "The Children" (Fontana, Palumbo) - 4:27
12. "Let It Live" (Lees, Lalo Schifrin) - 1:01
13. "The Armaments Worker" (Fontana, Palumbo, Wojtyla) - 5:14
14. "Toward the Light" (Boland) - 0:34
15. "Let It Live" - 3:28

== Personnel ==
- Sarah Vaughan - vocals
- Lalo Schifrin - arranger, conductor
