= Brazilian Romance =

Studio album by Sarah Vaughan
- Released: 1987
- Recorded: January, February, 1987
- Genre: Bossa nova, Vocal jazz
- Length: 35:26
- Label: Columbia
- Producer: Sérgio Mendes

Sarah Vaughan chronology
The Planet Is Alive...Let it Live! (1984)	Brazilian Romance (1987)

Professional ratings
Review scores
Source	Rating
Allmusic	3/5 stars
New Musical Express	5/10

Brazilian Romance is a 1987 studio album by Sarah Vaughan.

This was Vaughan's last album, though she later contributed to Quincy Jones' 1989 Back on the Block. Brazilian Romance was Vaughan's third album of Brazilian music, following Copacabana (1979) and I Love Brazil! (1977)

Vaughan was nominated for the Grammy Award for Best Jazz Vocal Performance, Female at the 30th Annual Grammy Awards for her performance on this album.

== Track listing ==
1. "Make This City Ours Tonight" ("Cançâo do sal") (Tracy Mann, Milton Nascimento) – 2:57
2. "Romance" (Danilo Caymmi, Mann, Paulo César Pinheiro) – 3:30
3. "Love and Passion" ("Amor e Paixão") (Mann, Nascimento) – 3:58
4. "So Many Stars" (Marilyn Bergman, Alan Bergman, Sérgio Mendes) – 4:07
5. "Photograph" ("Tati, a Garota") (Dori Caymmi, Mann, Paulo César Pinheiro) – 2:31
6. "Nothing Will Be as It Was" ("Nada Será Como Antes)" (Ronaldo Bastos, Nascimento, René Vicent) – 4:44
7. "It's Simple" (Caymmi, Mann, Pinheiro) – 2:58
8. "Obsession" (Caymmi, Mann, Gilson Peranzzetta) – 3:09
9. "Wanting More" ("O que se Sabe da Cor") (Fernando Leporace, Mann) – 3:54
10. "Your Smile" ("Estrela da Terra") (Caymmi, Pinheiro, Wolf) – 3:08

== Personnel ==
- Sarah Vaughan – vocal
- Milton Nascimento – vocal duet on "Love and Passion"
- George Duke – piano, keyboards
- Alphonso Johnson – bass guitar
- Dann Huff – guitar
- Dori Caymmi – guitar, arrangements
- Carlos Vega – drums
- Paulinho da Costa – percussion
- Hubert Laws – flute solo on "Obsession"
- Tom Scott – lyricon solo on "Love and Passion", tenor saxophone solo on "Make This City Ours Tonight"
- Ernie Watts – alto saxophone solo on "Nothing Will Be as It Was"
- Marcio Montarroyos – flugelhorn solo on "Romance", trumpet solo on "Make This City Ours Tonight"
- Chuck Domanico – acoustic bass on "Photograph"
- Siedah Garrett, Gracinha Leporace, Kate Markowitz – background vocals on "Your Smile"
- Gordon Marron, Barry Socher, Wilbert Nuttycombe, Robert Sanov, Jay Rosen, Shari Zippert, Ronald Folson, Irving Geller, Jean Hugo, Connie Kupka, Arthur Zadinsky, Bill Hybel, Marilyn Graham, Joseph Goodman, R. Hill - violin
- Kenneth Burward-Hoy, Gareth Nuttycombe, Marilyn H. Baker, Herschel Wise - viola
- Suzie Katayama, Larry Corbett, David Speltz, Todd Hemenway - cello
- Gayle Levant – harp
- Allen Sides - Mixing Engineer
