= Copacabana (Sarah Vaughan album) =

Studio album by Sarah Vaughan
- Released: 1979
- Recorded: 1979
- Genre: Bossa nova, vocal jazz
- Length: 35:59
- Label: Pablo Today
- Producer: Aloísio de Oliveira

Sarah Vaughan chronology
The Duke Ellington Songbook, Vol. 2 (1979)	Copacabana (1979)	Songs of The Beatles (1981)

Copacabana is a 1979 album by Sarah Vaughan. It was Vaughan's second album of bossa nova following I Love Brazil!; her third album of Brazilian music, Brazilian Romance followed in 1987.

== Reception ==
Professional ratings
Review scores
Source	Rating
AllMusic	2/5 stars
Los Angeles Times	3.5/5 stars
The Penguin Guide to Jazz Recordings	4/4 stars
The Rolling Stone Album Guide	4/5 stars

Although the contemporaneous review by Los Angeles Times jazz critic Leonard Feather was somewhat mixed, he did not fault the featured artist:

That this set does not reach the consistent heights of its predecessor, "I Love Brazil," cannot be blamed on Vaughan. The difference lies in the accompaniment, which this time is spotty. Who needs that unison choir background on "Smiling Hour"? Vaughan is not Mitch Miller. The simplistic percussion on "Bonita" could be a metronome. Still, Hélio Delmiro's guitar, an unidentified cello and the incomparable Vaughan contralto applied to "Dindi," "Gentle Rain" and Jobim's "Double Rainbow" (English lyrics by Gene Lees) elevate this to 3½ stars.

The Penguin Guide to Jazz Recordings awarded the album a maximum four-star rating, and commented that the bossa nova and samba repertoire on it was "unexpectedly strong for Vaughan".

== Track listing ==
1. "Copacabana" (Joao DeBarro, Alberto Ribeiro) - 3:39
2. "The Smiling Hour (Abre Alas)" (Ivan Lins, Vítor Martins, Louis Oliveira) - 4:19
3. "To Say Goodbye (Pra Dizer Adeus)" (Hall, Lobo, Neto) - 3:49
4. "Dreamer (Vivo Sonhando)" (Antônio Carlos Jobim, Gene Lees) - 3:41
5. "Gentle Rain" (Luiz Bonfá, Matt Dubey) - 2:50
6. "Tetê" (Boscoli, Ray Gilbert, Menescal) - 4:41
7. "Dindi" (Gilbert, Jobim) - 5:32
8. "Double Rainbow (Chovendo Na Roseira)" (Jobim, Lees) - 3:34
9. "Bonita" (Lees, Gilbert, Jobim) - 3:54

== Personnel ==
Performance

- Sarah Vaughan - vocals
- Hélio Delmiro - guitar
- Andy Simpkins - double bass
- Wilson DasNeves - drums
- Grady Tate
- Edson Frederico - arranger

Production

- Luiz Garrido - photography
- Tamaki Beck - mastering
- Aloísio de Oliveira - producer
