= Blue Hour =

Studio album by Stanley Turrentine with The Three Sounds
- Released: March 1961
- Recorded: June 29 & December 16, 1960
- Studio: Van Gelder Studio, Englewood Cliffs, NJ
- Genre: Jazz
- Length: 37:30 original LP; 84:25 The Complete Sessions
- Label: Blue Note; BST 84057
- Producer: Alfred Lion

Stanley Turrentine chronology
Look Out! (1960)	Blue Hour (1961)	Comin' Your Way (1961)

The Three Sounds chronology
It Just Got to Be (1960)	Blue Hour (1961)	Hey There (1961)

Blue Hour is a collaboration album by jazz saxophonist Stanley Turrentine and The Three Sounds recorded in 1961 for the Blue Note label and performed by Turrentine with Gene Harris, Andrew Simpkins and Bill Dowdy. The album was reissued in 2000 with an additional disc of unreleased recordings, as Blue Hour: The Complete Sessions (Blue Note 24586).

== Reception ==
Professional ratings
Review scores
Source	Rating
Allmusic	4.5/5 stars
The Penguin Guide to Jazz Recordings	3/4 stars

The album was awarded 4½ stars by Michael Erlewine of Allmusic. The 2000 2CD Reissue was awarded 3 stars and described as "a very relaxed and bluesy release".

== Track listing ==
Original LP

1. "I Want a Little Girl" (Murray Mencher, Billy Moll) – 7:03
2. "Gee Baby, Ain't I Good to You" (Andy Razaf, Don Redman) – 5:20
3. "Blue Riff" (Gene Harris) – 6:26
4. "Since I Fell for You" (Buddy Johnson) – 8:46
5. "Willow Weep for Me" (Ann Ronell) – 9:55

Bonus tracks on Blue Hour: The Complete Sessions CD 2:

1. "Blues in the Closet" (Pettiford) – 5:00
2. "Just in Time" (Comden, Green, Styne) – 5:40
3. "Gee Baby, Ain't I Good to You" [Alternate Take] – 5:33
4. "Where or When" (Hart, Rodgers) – 7:00
5. "Blue Hour" (Gene Harris) – 5:14
6. "There Is No Greater Love" (Jones, Symes) – 8:24
7. "Alone Together" (Dietz, Schwartz) – 4:40
8. "Strike up the Band" (George Gershwin, Ira Gershwin) – 5:24

Recorded on December 16, 1960 (original LP & CD 2 tracks 1–3) and June 29, 1960 (CD 2 tracks 4–8).

== Personnel ==
- Stanley Turrentine – tenor saxophone
- Gene Harris – piano
- Andrew Simpkins – bass
- Bill Dowdy – drums

=== Production ===
- Alfred Lion – producer
- Reid Miles – design
- Rudy Van Gelder – audio engineer
- Francis Wolff – photography
