= It Just Got to Be =

Studio album by The Three Sounds
- Released: June 1963
- Recorded: December 13–14, 1960; Van Gelder Studio, Englewood Cliffs
- Genre: Jazz
- Length: 38:27 original LP; 47:28 CD reissue
- Label: Blue Note; BST 84120
- Producer: Alfred Lion

The Three Sounds chronology
Here We Come (1960)	It Just Got to Be (1963)	Blue Hour (1960)

It Just Got to Be is an album by the jazz group The Three Sounds with performances recorded in 1960. It was released on the Blue Note label in 1963. It was reissued on CD only in Japan, with two bonus tracks.

== Reception ==
The Allmusic review by Stephen Thomas Erlewine awarded the album 3 stars stating, "The performances throughout the record are predictably swinging and enjoyable, even if they find the trio taking no stylistic chances. That lack of adventure doesn't matter, though — the Three Sounds excel at making unpretentious, unabashedly enjoyable mainstream jazz, and there's something endearing about their ability to produce a body of work of consistently high quality".

Professional ratings
Review scores
Source	Rating
Allmusic	3/5 stars

== Track listing ==
All compositions by Gene Harris except as indicated

1. "One for Renee" - 3:04
2. "Stella by Starlight" (Washington, Young) - 5:32
3. "It Just Got to Be" - 5:15
4. "If I Were a Bell" (Loesser) - 5:36
5. "Blue 'n' Boogie" (Gillespie, Frank Paparelli) - 5:20
6. "The Nearness of You" (Carmichael, Washington) - 5:49
7. "Real Gene" - 3:35
8. "South of the Border" (Kennedy, Carr) - 4:16

Bonus tracks on CD reissue:

9. "Girl Next Door" - 4:35
10. "This Is the Way 'Tis" - 4:26

Recorded on December 13 (3–4, 8) and December 14 (1–2, 5–7), 1960.

== Personnel ==
- Gene Harris - piano
- Andrew Simpkins - double bass
- Bill Dowdy - drums
