= Soul Symphony =

Studio album by The Three Sounds
- Released: 1969
- Recorded: August 26 & 28, 1969
- Studio: Liberty Studios, West Hollywood, California
- Genre: Jazz
- Length: 43:54
- Label: Blue Note
- Producer: Monk Higgins, Dee Ervin

The Three Sounds chronology
Elegant Soul (1968)	Soul Symphony (1969)	Live at the 'It Club' (1970)

Soul Symphony is the final album by jazz group The Three Sounds featuring performances with an orchestra arranged and conducted by Monk Higgins recorded in 1969 and released on the Blue Note label.

== Reception ==
The Allmusic review by Thom Jurek awarded the album 3 stars stating "Soul Symphony is far from a throwaway; it's a deeply grooved-out tough record with all of the Three Sounds magic on full view, and is highly recommended to any fan of soul-jazz or beat hunting".

Professional ratings
Review scores
Source	Rating
Allmusic	3/5 stars

== Track listing ==
All compositions by Monk Higgins except as indicated

1. "Soul Symphony" - 25:55
2. "Repeat After Me" - 6:43
3. "Upper Four Hundred" (Dee Ervin, Higgins) - 4:04
4. "Popsicle Pimp" (Ervin, Higgins) 2:57
5. "Black Sugar" (Ervin, Higgins) - 4:15

- Recorded at Liberty Studios in West Hollywood, California on August 26 (tracks 2–6) and August 27 (track 1), 1969

== Personnel ==
- Gene Harris - piano
- Henry Franklin - bass
- Carl Burnett - drums
- Monk Higgins - arranger, conductor
- David Duke, Art Maebe - french horn
- Buddy Collette - flute, alto flute
- Fred Robinson - guitar
- Alan Estes - percussion
- Unidentified string section led by Jim Getzof (track 1) and Sid Sharp (tracks 2–6)
- Alex Brown, Mamie Galore, Clydie King - backing vocals
