= LD+3 =

Studio album by Lou Donaldson with the 3 Sounds
- Released: Early October 1959
- Recorded: February 18, 1959
- Studio: Van Gelder Studio; Hackensack, New Jersey
- Genre: Jazz
- Length: 38:22
- Label: Blue Note; BLP 4012
- Producer: Alfred Lion

Lou Donaldson chronology
Light-Foot (1959)	LD+3 (1959)	The Time Is Right (1959)

The 3 Sounds chronology
Introducing the 3 Sounds (1958)	LD+3 (1959)	Bottoms Up! (1959)

LD+3 is an album by American jazz saxophonist Lou Donaldson with the Three Sounds—consisting of rhythm section Gene Harris, Andrew Simpkins, and Bill Dowdy—recorded on February 18, 1959, and released on Blue Note later that year.

== Reception ==
Professional ratings
Review scores
Source	Rating
AllMusic	4.5/5 stars
DownBeat	3/5 stars

The AllMusic review by Stephen Thomas Erlewine states, "Donaldson is at a fiery peak, spinning out Bird-influenced licks that nevertheless illustrate that he's developed a more rounded, individual style of his own. The Three Sounds are equally as impressive, working bop rhythms with a dexterity that their first albums only hinted at. That high standard is maintained throughout the album, one of the finest in either of their catalogs. Albums like this and Blues Walk established Donaldson's reputation as a first-rate alto saxophonist, since he flaunts a full, robust tone, a fondness for melody, and nimble solos over the course of the record. LD + 3 is pretty much straight bop and hard bop, with little of the soul-jazz the two artists would later explore, but this collection of swinging standards, bop staples, and a pair of Donaldson originals ranks as one of Lou's finest straight bop sessions."

== Track listing ==
All compositions by Lou Donaldson, except as noted.

=== Side 1 ===
1. "Three Little Words" (Bert Kalmar, Harry Ruby) – 6:20
2. "Smooth Groove" – 5:51
3. "Just Friends" (John Klenner, Lewis) – 5:11
4. "Blue Moon" (Hart, Rodgers) – 3:04

=== Side 2 ===
1. "Jump Up" – 6:33
2. "Don't Take Your Love from Me" (Henry Nemo) – 5:50
3. "Confirmation" (Parker) – 5:33

== Personnel ==
=== Lou Donaldson with the Three Sounds ===
- Lou Donaldson – alto saxophone
- Gene Harris – piano
- Andrew Simpkins – bass
- Bill Dowdy – drums

=== Technical personnel ===
- Alfred Lion – producer
- Rudy Van Gelder – recording engineer, mastering
- Reid Miles – design
- Francis Wolff – photography
- Jack Maher – liner notes
