= Henry Franklin =

American jazz double bassist (born 1940)

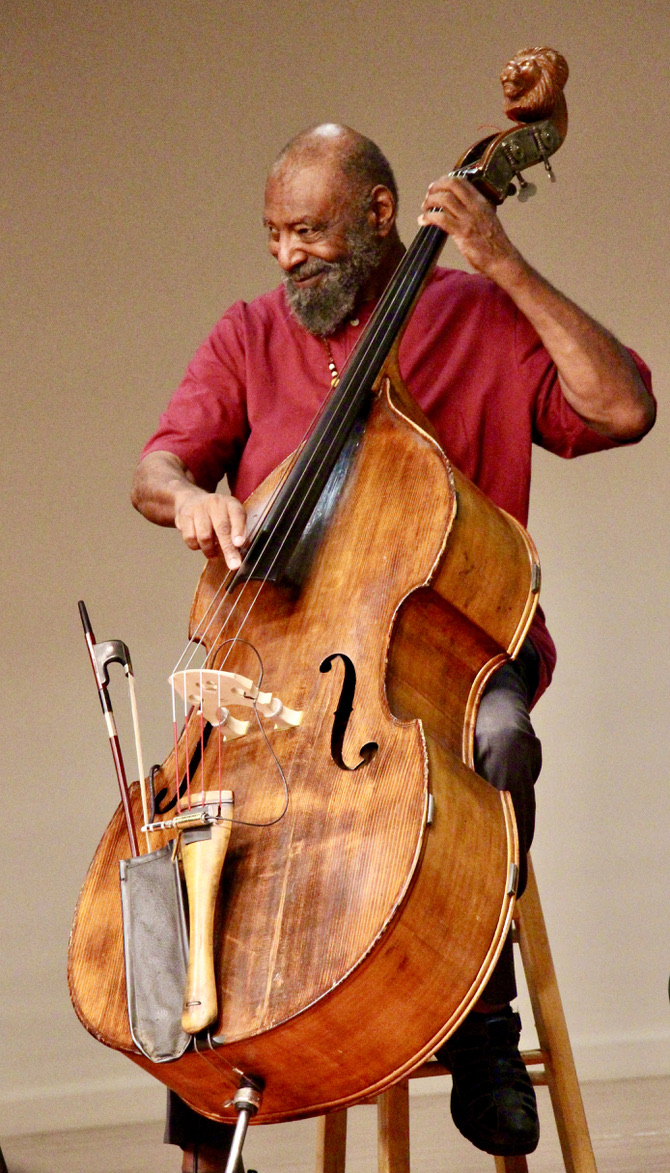
- Franklin at Pierce Street Jazz - 2014

Background information
- Born: October 1, 1940 (age 85); Los Angeles, California
- Genres: Jazz
- Occupation: Musician
- Instrument: Double bass
- Years active: 1960–present
- Labels: Beezwax; Black Jazz; Catalyst; Daagnim; Daggerboard; Jazz Is Dead; Resurgent; Skipper Productions; WJ3

Henry "Skipper" Franklin (born Henry Carl Franklin on October 1, 1940) is an American jazz double bassist.

== Career ==
Franklin played on Hugh Masekela's 1968 number one single, "Grazing in the Grass," as well as with Masekela's band at the Monterey International Pop Festival in June 1967. In addition, Franklin played and recorded with Gene Harris and the Three Sounds, Hampton Hawes, Freddie Hubbard, Bobbi Humphrey, Willie Bobo, Archie Shepp, O.C. Smith, Count Basie, Stevie Wonder, Al Jarreau, Curtis Amy, Teddy Edwards, and Sonny Criss. Franklin's recording—composed by Sanifu Al Hall, Jr.— "Soft Spirit" was featured on the Breakbeat compilation Tribe Vibes as it had been sampled by the musical group A Tribe Called Quest.

Encouraged by his father, Sammy Franklin, a jazz trumpeter and bandleader, he studied with Al McKibbon and George Morrow, while listening to Paul Chambers and Doug Watkins.

While attending the Manual Arts High School in Los Angeles, he played with his first professional band – the Roy Ayers Latin Jazz Quintet. About that time, Franklin worked with Harold Land and Hampton Hawes. Years later, he toured Europe with Hawes and recorded five albums with him. In Los Angeles, Franklin also played with Don Cherry, and Billy Higgins.

In 1968, after Henry's year-long tour of the East Coast playing with Willie Bobo and working gigs with Archie Shepp, Lamont Johnson, Beaver Harris and Roswell Rudd on his days off, Hugh Masekela heard him play and made him an offer. Three and a half years later, the two collaborated on Grazing in the Grass. In 1972, Franklin released his debut album The Skipper through Black Jazz Records. Music critic, Tom Hull, described it as "adventurous postbop."

He continued touring during the next several years, working internationally with O.C. Smith, The Three Sounds, Freddie Hubbard, and Count Basie. Franklin collected a gold record with Stevie Wonder on Journey Through The Secret Life of Plants. Collaborating with John Carter and Bobby Bradford, Franklin produced two albums: Self-Determination Music and Secrets. He performed on five albums with Dennis Gonzales, John Purcell and William Richardson and also played extensively with Pharoah Sanders, Joe Williams, Sonny Rollins, Bobby Hutcherson, Sonny Fortune and Milt Jackson.

For over a decade until 2011, Franklin played a regular, five-night-per-week gig at The Mission Inn, in Riverside, CA. In the summer of 2009, the director of the summer program and the provost of La Sierra University in Riverside partnered with Franklin to provide some on-campus, summer jazz concerts. These continued in the fall, eventually becoming a regular campus concert series, "Pierce Street Jazz" (PSJ). Still organized and headlined by Franklin, PSJ continues to feature well-known local and national jazz musicians as guests performing with the regular house trio. For many years he has also been a regular performer in the Friday night jazz events at the Los Angeles County Museum of Art (LACMA) in Los Angeles and at Jazz in the Pines, an annual, summer jazz festival in Idyllwild, CA.

Franklin's disc, Henry Franklin: JID014, was released in Sep 2022 – the 14th by Adrian Younge and Ali Shaheed Muhammad on the Jazz Is Dead label. In his review, Chris May considers the album to be the label's “most satisfying disc to date” and one that has “done Franklin proud.” In 2023, this album won the 54th NCAAP Image Award for "Outstanding Jazz Album - Instrumental."

He also published a jazz bass player's method book entitled, Bassically Yours. Originally released in 1975 in printed form, it is now available only as an online .pdf download. The book, with melody lines and chords, contains 225 tunes, including many standards by such notables as Miles Davis, Bud Powell, Sonny Rollins, Bill Evans, Freddie Hubbard, Cole Porter, John Coltrane, Duke Ellington, McCoy Tyner and others, including, of course, the Skipper.

== Discography ==
Throughout his career, Franklin has appeared on more than 160 albums, many of which he produced. The following is a selection of these:

=== As leader ===
- The Skipper (Black Jazz, 1972)
- The Skipper at Home (Black Jazz, 1974)
- Tribal Dance (Catalyst, 1977)
- We Came to Play (Daagnim, 1985)
- Bassic Instincts (Skipper Productions, 1996)
- The Hunter (Skipper Productions, 1998)
- Bass Encounters (Skipper Productions, 2000)
- Sakura with Steve Katsuyama, Tony Austin (WJ3, 2002)
- Ears Wide Open with Marc Seales, Steve Clover (Beezwax, 2003)
- Colemanology with Marc Seales, Steve Clover (Beezwax, 2004)
- Three Card Molly (Resurgent, 2004)
- All God's Children (Skipper Productions, 2005)
- Music to the 5th Power (Skipper Productions, 2006)
- If We Should Meet Again (Skipper Productions, 2007)
- O, What a Beautiful Morning! (Skipper Productions, 2008)
- Home Cookin' (Skipper Productions, 2009)
- Shanghai with Bob Mocarsky (Skipper Productions, 2011)
- The Soul of the World (Skipper Productions, 2011)
- June Night (Skipper Productions, 2012)
- Two Views (Skipper Productions, 2015)
- Showers of Blessings (Skipper Productions, 2021)
- Karibu (released as Henry Franklin: JID014) (Jazz Is Dead, 2022)

=== With 3 More Sounds (group) ===
- The Happiness of Pursuit (Skipper Productions, 2015)
- High Voltage (Tribute to McCoy Tyner) (Skipper Productions, 2016)
- Ghetto Princes (Tribute to Gene Harris) (Skipper Productions, 2019)
- Live at the Gardenia Club (Skipper Productions, 2020)
- 3 More Sounds Play Ray Charles (Skipper Productions, 2022)
- Going to New Orleans (Tribute to Fats Domino) (Skipper Productions, 2026)

=== As sideman ===
With Donald Byrd

- Live: Cookin' with Blue Note at Montreux (1973)

With John Carter and Bobby Bradford

- Self Determination Music (Flying Dutchman, 1970)
- Secrets (Revelation, 1972)

With Daggerboard

- Daggerboard & The Skipper (Wide Hive, 2022)

With Dennis González

- Little Toot (Silkheart, 1986)
- Stefan (Silkheart, 1987)
- Debengi Debengi (Silkheart, 1988)

With Hampton Hawes

- A Little Copenhagen Night Music (Freedom, 1971)
- Live at the Montmartre (Black Lion, 1971)
- Live in Montreux (JAS, 1971)
- This Guy's in Love with You (Freedom, 1971)
- Blues for Walls (Prestige, 1973)

With Bobbi Humphrey

- Live at Montreux (Blue Note, 1973)

With Calvin Keys

- Proceed with Caution (Black Jazz, 1971)
- Shawn-Neeq (Black Jazz, 1973)
- Blue Keys (Wide Hive, 2022)

With Hugh Masekela

- Hugh Masekela Is Alive and Well at the Whisky (Uni, 1967)
- The Promise of a Future (Uni, 1968)
- Masekela (uncredited) (Uni, 1969)

With Julian Priester

- Love, Love (ECM, 1973)

With Freddie Redd

- Straight Ahead! (Interplay, 1977)

With Sonny Rollins

- Live in New York at Philharmonic Hall (1972)

With Woody Shaw

- Song of Songs (Contemporary, 1972)

With The Three Sounds

- Soul Symphony (Blue Note, 1969)
- Live at the 'It Club', Volumes 1 and 2 (Blue Note, 1971)

With Phil Woods

- Phil Woods Quartet (1974)

== Assessments ==
=== The Bass ===
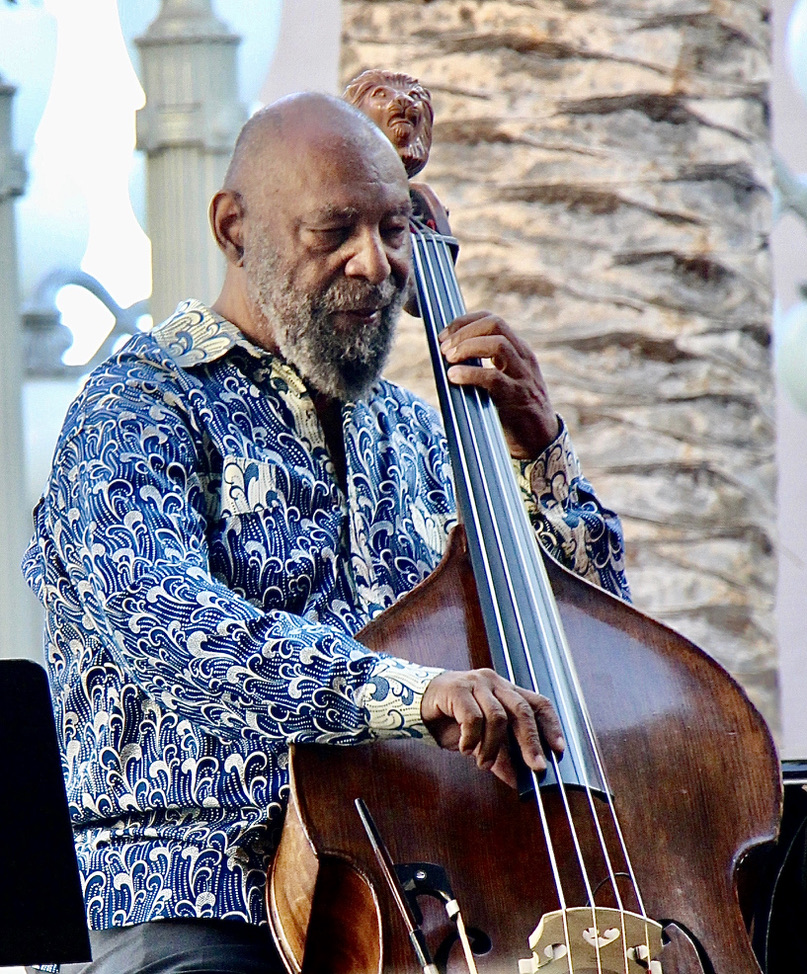
LACMA - 2014

Here is a lyrical assessment of the double bass and its role in Jazz:

Laying in the bouquet of any jazz ensemble, of any era, playing any style, is the bass. Sturdy and stoic, but also capable of providing the emotional crux, the bass is an essential unit, a compass on which the rest of the ensemble relies on, the provider of the heartbeat, the rhythm, the feel. The conjurer of traditions, the conductor of an elastic orchestra, writing symphonies in real time.

=== The Bassist ===
Here is an assessment of the bassist, Henry Franklin:

There is one such maestro whose own legacy, much like their instrument, has been obscured while remaining ever present. Through a closer listen it becomes evident that the music and career of Henry "The Skipper" Franklin is among the most luminous of any jazz artist....Recognized by his peers and contemporaries, Franklin's entry for Jazz Is Dead gives the living legend his flowers and recognizes the contributions The Skipper has made as one of jazz's most influential heartbeats.
