= Today's Sounds =

Live album by The Three Sounds
- Released: 1966
- Recorded: February 1966
- Venues: London House, Chicago, IL
- Genre: Jazz
- Length: 39:16
- Labels: Limelight; LM 82037/LS 86037
- Producer: Jack Tracy

The Three Sounds chronology
| Beautiful Friendship (1965) | Today's Sounds (1966) | Vibrations (1966) |

Today's Sounds is a live album by The Three Sounds which was recorded at the London House in Chicago in 1966 and released on the Limelight label.

== Reception ==
Professional ratings
Review scores
| Source | Rating |
|---|---|
| Allmusic | 2.5/5 stars |

Allmusic's Ken Dryden noted, "The group's brief sojourn onto the label marked a turn to a more rock and pop influence in their repertoire, as is evident in many of the poor choices for this live recording, made at the London House in Chicago in early 1966. ... Most fans will likely prefer the Three Sounds' earlier Blue Note releases or Harris' many outstanding quartet recordings during his long association with Concord ".

== Track listing ==
All compositions by Gene Harris except where noted

1. "Downtown" (Tony Hatch) − 3:12
2. "Gee, Baby, Ain't I Good to You" (Andy Razaf, Don Redman) − 5:00
3. "The Way I Feel" − 4:18
4. "The Good Life" (Sacha Distel, Jack Reardon) − 4:50
5. "Mohair Sam" (Dallas Frazier) − 2:03
6. "Simple Simon" − 3:15
7. "A.M. Blues" (Ray Brown) − 4:53
8. "Old Folks" (Dedette Lee Hill, Willard Robison) − 7:32
9. "Goodnight Ladies" (Edwin Pearce Christy) − 4:13

== Personnel ==
- Gene Harris − piano
- Andy Simpkins − bass
- Kalil Madi − drums
