= To the Ivy League from Nat =

Studio album by Nat Adderley
- Released: 1956
- Recorded: July 12, 18 & 23, 1956
- Genre: Jazz
- Label: EmArcy

Nat Adderley chronology
Introducing Nat Adderley (1955)	To the Ivy League from Nat (1956)	Branching Out (1958)

To the Ivy League from Nat is an album by jazz cornetist Nat Adderley released on the EmArcy label featuring performances by Adderley with his brother Cannonball Adderley, Junior Mance, Sam Jones/Al McKibbon, and Charles "Specs" Wright with arrangements by Ernie Wilkins. The album was later released as part of the Cannonball Adderley compilation Sophisticated Swing: The EmArcy Small Group Sessions in 1995.

== Reception ==
The Allmusic review awarded the album four stars.

Professional ratings
Review scores
Source	Rating
Allmusic	4/5 stars

== Track listing ==
Compositions by Nat Adderley except as indicated

1. "Room 251" [aka Number 251] (Jaki Byard) - 2:45
2. "Sam's Tune" (Sam Jones) - 3:32
3. "Sam's Tune" [alternate take] (Jones) - 3:06 Bonus track on CD
4. "Bimini" - 3:40
5. "The Fat Man" (Jerome Richardson) - 3:30
6. "Sermonette" (Julian "Cannonball" Adderley) - 3:36
7. "Jackleg" (Samuel Hurt) - 3:50
8. "The Nearness of You" (Hoagy Carmichael, Ned Washington) - 6:21
9. "Rattler's Groove" - 3:25
10. "Hayseed" - 3:06
11. "Hoppin' John" (Nat Adderley, Julian "Cannonball" Adderley) - 4:38 Bonus track on CD
12. "Yesterdays" (Jerome Kern, Otto Harbach) - 2:53 Bonus track on CD

- Recorded in New York City on July 12 (tracks 4, 6, 10 & 11), 18 (tracks 1, 7 & 9), & 23 (tracks 2, 3, 5, 8 & 12), 1956

== Personnel ==
- Nat Adderley – cornet
- Cannonball Adderley – alto saxophone
- Junior Mance – piano
- Sam Jones – bass (tracks 3–11), cello (tracks 2 & 3)
- Al McKibbon – bass (tracks 1–3)
- Charles "Specs" Wright – drums
