= Feelin' Good (The Three Sounds album) =

Studio album by The Three Sounds
- Released: Early September 1961
- Recorded: June 28, 1960
- Studio: Van Gelder Studio, Englewood Cliffs, NJ
- Genre: Jazz
- Length: 38:51
- Label: Blue Note; BST 84072
- Producer: Alfred Lion

The Three Sounds chronology
Moods (1960)	Feelin' Good (1961)	Here We Come (1960)

Feelin' Good is an album by jazz group The Three Sounds featuring performances recorded in 1960 and released on the Blue Note label. It was released on CD only in Japan.

== Reception ==
Professional ratings
Review scores
Source	Rating
Allmusic	4.5/5 stars

The Allmusic review by Stephen Thomas Erlewine awarded the album 4 stars stating "An appropriate title for an utterly charming set from the Three Sounds. The trio works familiar territory on Feelin' Good, playing a set of swinging hard bop and classy soul-jazz, but there's a definite spark in the air... It captures the Three Sounds at a peak, which means Feelin' Good is an excellent example of early soul-jazz".

== Track listing ==
1. "When I Fall in Love" (Heyman, Young) - 4:56
2. "Parker's Pad" (Gene Harris) - 3:37
3. "Blues After Dark" (Golson) - 3:45
4. "I Got It Bad (and That Ain't Good)" (Ellington) - 6:21
5. "Straight, No Chaser" (Monk) - 6:41
6. "I Let a Song Go Out of My Heart" (Duke Ellington, Irving Mills) - 4:08
7. "It Could Happen to You" (Burke, Van Heusen) - 5:31
8. "Two Bass Hit" (Lewis, Gillespie) - 3:52

== Personnel ==
- Gene Harris - piano
- Andrew Simpkins - bass
- Bill Dowdy - drums
