= Much Brass =

Studio album by Nat Adderley
- Released: 1959
- Recorded: March 23 & 27, 1959
- Genre: Jazz
- Length: 39:46
- Label: Riverside

Nat Adderley chronology
Branching Out (1958)	Much Brass (1959)	Work Song (1960)

Much Brass is an album by jazz cornetist Nat Adderley released on the Riverside label featuring performances by Adderley's Sextet with Slide Hampton, Wynton Kelly, Sam Jones, Laymon Jackson, and Albert Heath.

== Reception ==
The Allmusic review awarded the album 4 stars. The Penguin Guide to Jazz awarded the album 3 stars, stating: "Some interesting arrangements here, presumably largely the work of Hampton, and some delicately interwoven playing which largely belies the bluster implied in the title.... Not immediately identifiable as a 'typical' Nat Adderley record, but a beautiful statement all the same."

Professional ratings
Review scores
Source	Rating
Allmusic	4/5 stars
The Penguin Guide to Jazz	3/4 stars

== Track listing ==
All compositions by Nat Adderley except as indicated

1. "Blue Concept" (Gigi Gryce) - 7:37
2. "Little Miss" (Buddy DeSylva, George Gershwin) - 4:28
3. "Israel" (Johnny Carisi) - 3:53
4. "What Next?" - 3:20
5. "Moving" - 5:03
6. "Blue Brass Groove" (Nat Adderley, Julian "Cannonball" Adderley) - 5:39
7. "Accents" - 5:40
8. "Sometimes I Feel Like a Motherless Child" (Traditional) - 4:06

- Recorded in New York City on March 23 & 27, 1959

== Personnel ==
- Nat Adderley – cornet
- Slide Hampton – tuba (track 1), trombone (tracks 2–7)
- Wynton Kelly – piano
- Sam Jones – bass (tracks 2–8), cello (track 1)
- Laymon Jackson – bass (track 1), tuba (tracks 2–8)
- Albert Heath – drums
