= Live in London (Gene Harris album) =

Live album by Gene Harris
- Released: 2008
- Recorded: May 1996
- Venue: The Pizza Express, London, England
- Genre: Jazz
- Label: Resonance Records
- Producer: George Klabin

Gene Harris chronology
Alley Cats (1998)	Live in London (2008)	Another Night in London (2010)

Live in London is a jazz album recorded in 1996 by jazz pianist Gene Harris.

== Track listing ==
1. "There Is No Greater Love" (Symes, Jones) - 13:26
2. "Blue Monk" (Monk) - 11:18
3. "My Funny Valentine" (Rodgers, Hart) - 6:08
4. "In a Mellow Tone" (Ellington) - 15:18
5. "Misty" (Erroll Garner) 9:07
6. "Blues Closer" (Gene Harris) 7:22

== Personnel ==
- Gene Harris - Piano
- Jim Mullen - Guitar
- Andrew Cleyndert - Bass
- Martin Drew - Drums
- Pierre Paul - Engineer
- Andrew Cleyndert - Engineer
- George Klabin - Executive Producer
- Pierre Paul - Mastered By
