= Stan "The Man" Turrentine =

Studio album by Stanley Turrentine
- Released: 1962
- Recorded: January 1960; New York City
- Genre: Jazz
- Length: 34:17
- Label: Time; Time 52086

Stanley Turrentine chronology
Stan "The Man" Turrentine (1962)	Look Out! (1960)

Tiger Tail Cover

Stan "The Man" Turrentine is the debut album recorded in 1960 by jazz saxophonist Stanley Turrentine originally released on the Time label in 1962, and subsequently re-released on Mainstream as Tiger Tail.

== Reception ==
Professional ratings
Review scores
Source	Rating
Allmusic	3/5 stars
The Rolling Stone Jazz Record Guide	4/5 stars

The Allmusic review by Michael Erlewine states "This tends to be uptempo and mainstream. It lacks the distinctive Turrentine sound that later albums show.".

== Track listing ==
All compositions by Stanley Turrentine except as indicated

1. "Let's Groove" - 6:01
2. "Sheri" - 4:49
3. "Stolen Sweets" (Wild Bill Davis) - 5:20
4. "Mild Is the Mood" - 4:59
5. "Minor Mood" - 5:10
6. "Time After Time" (Sammy Cahn, Jule Styne) - 3:17
7. "My Girl Is Just Enough Woman for Me" (Dorothy Fields, Al Hague) - 4:41

== Personnel ==
- Stanley Turrentine - tenor saxophone
- Sonny Clark (tracks 2, 4 & 7), Tommy Flanagan (tracks 1, 3, 5 & 6) - piano
- George Duvivier - bass
- Max Roach - drums
