= Moods (The Three Sounds album) =

Studio album by The Three Sounds
- Released: February 1961
- Recorded: June 28, 1960; Van Gelder Studio, Englewood Cliffs
- Genre: Jazz blues
- Length: 42:13
- Label: Blue Note; BST 84044
- Producer: Alfred Lion

The Three Sounds chronology
Good Deal (1959)	Moods (1961)	Feelin' Good (1960)

Moods is an album by jazz group The Three Sounds released in 1961 on the Blue Note label. It was recorded the same day Feelin' Good was recorded.

== Reception ==
Professional ratings
Review scores
Source	Rating
Allmusic	4/5 stars

The Allmusic review by Stephen Thomas Erlewine awarded the album 4 stars stating "The Three Sounds open their signature sound a bit on the romantic Moods. They retain the same light touch that made their early albums so enjoyable, but they add more textures to the mix... on the whole, Moods is an endearing collection of appealing mainstream jazz".

== Track listing ==
1. "Love for Sale" (Porter) - 6:37
2. "Things Ain't What They Used to Be" (Mercer Ellington) - 8:54
3. "On Green Dolphin Street" (Bronisław Kaper, Ned Washington) - 5:37
4. "Loose Walk" (Sonny Stitt) - 4:55
5. "Li'l Darlin'" (Neal Hefti) - 4:52
6. "I'm Beginning to See the Light" (Ellington, George, Hodges, James) - 2:29
7. "Tammy's Breeze" (Gene Harris) - 4:28
8. "Sandu" (Clifford Brown) - 4:21

== Personnel ==
- Gene Harris - piano
- Andrew Simpkins - bass
- Bill Dowdy - drums
