= Coldwater Flat =

1968 studio album by The Three Sounds, Oliver Nelson

Studio album by The Three Sounds
- Released: August/September 1968
- Recorded: April 10–12, 1968
- Studio: Liberty Studios, West Hollywood, CA
- Genre: Jazz
- Label: Blue Note
- Producer: Jack Tracy

The Three Sounds chronology
Live at the Lighthouse (1967)	Coldwater Flat (1968)	Elegant Soul (1968)

Oliver Nelson chronology
Soulful Brass (1968)	Coldwater Flat (1968)	Soulful Brass 2 (1969)

Coldwater Flat is an album by jazz group The Three Sounds featuring performances with an orchestra arranged by Oliver Nelson recorded in 1968 and released on the Blue Note label.

== Reception ==
The Allmusic review by Stephen Thomas Erlewine awarded the album 3 stars stating "One of the primary attractions of the Three Sounds' sound was its simplicity and their ability to find so much variation within the trio format. That magic is somewhat lost with the orchestra, which tends to overwhelm the trio. More than anything, that is what prevents Coldwater Flat from ranking among the group's finest efforts, but the glossy production has its appealing moments as well, and the record does function well as pleasant background music, even if it veers too close to easy listening to be true jazz".

Professional ratings
Review scores
Source	Rating
Allmusic	3/5 stars

== Track listing ==
1. "Lonely Bottles" (Quincy Jones)
2. "The Look of Love" (Burt Bacharach, Hal David)
3. "Georgia" (Hoagy Carmichael, Stuart Gorrell)
4. "Grass Is Greener" (Howlett Smith, Spence Maxwell)
5. "Coldwater Flat" (Phil Moore)
6. "Last Train to Clarksville" (Boyce and Hart)
7. "My Romance" (Lorenz Hart, Richard Rodgers)
8. "I Remember Bird" (Leonard Feather)
9. "Do Do Do (What Now Is Next)" (Gail Fisher Levy, Nat Adderley)
10. "Star Trek" (Gene Harris)
  - Recorded at Liberty Studios in West Hollywood, California on April 10 (tracks 2–4 & 8), April 11 (tracks 1, 5–7 & 9), and April 12 (track 10), 1968

== Personnel ==
- Gene Harris - piano, organ
- Andrew Simpkins - bass
- Donald Bailey - drums
- Oliver Nelson - arranger
- Bobby Bryant, Conte Candoli, Buddy Childers, Freddy Hill, Melvin Moore - trumpet
- Lou Blackburn, Milt Bernhart, Billy Byers, Pete Myers - trombone
- Ernie Tack - bass trombone
- Anthony Ortega, Frank Strozier - alto saxophone
- Plas Johnson, Jay Migliori, Tom Scott - tenor saxophone
- Bill Green - baritone saxophone
- Lou Singer - timpani
- Ken Watson - percussion
