= Anita O'Day & the Three Sounds =

Studio album by Anita O'Day & The Three Sounds
- Released: 1963
- Recorded: October 12, 13, 14 & 15, 1962
- Studio: Van Gelder Studio, Englewood Cliffs, NJ
- Genre: Jazz
- Length: 38:08
- Label: Verve; V/V6 8514
- Producer: Creed Taylor

Anita O'Day chronology
Time for 2 (1962)	Anita O'Day & the Three Sounds (1963)	Incomparable! (1964)

The Three Sounds chronology
Blue Genes (1963)	Anita O'Day & the Three Sounds (1963)	The Three Sounds Play Jazz on Broadway (1963)

Anita O'Day & the Three Sounds is an album by vocalist Anita O'Day and The Three Sounds recorded for the Verve label in late 1962.

== Reception ==
Professional ratings
Review scores
Source	Rating
Allmusic	4.5/5 stars

The Allmusic review by Bruce Eder stated: "This strange (and strangely compelling) album is the most controversial of all O'Day's Verve Records releases, popular among O'Day's hardcore fans for the showcase that the Three Sounds' near-minimalist accompaniment affords her singing ... while O'Day sings five songs. She is amazingly restrained and low-key throughout most of her work here ... she seems uninspired in terms of any inventiveness, with long stretches of silence where one would have expected her to improvise. What is here is fine ... but there's amazingly little life to the procedings [sic]."

== Track listing ==
1. "When the World Was Young" (Philippe-Gérard, Johnny Mercer) – 3:30
2. "Someday My Prince Will Come" (Frank Churchill, Larry Morey) – 4:21
3. "All Too Soon" (Duke Ellington, Carl Sigman) – 3:15
4. "My Heart Stood Still" (Richard Rodgers, Lorenz Hart) – 3:33
5. "My Ship" (Kurt Weill, Ira Gershwin) – 4:30
6. "Leave It to Me" (Donn Trenner) – 5:12
7. "Whisper Not" (Benny Golson, Leonard Feather) – 2:52
8. "Blues by Five" (The Three Sounds) – 4:36
9. "(Fly Me to the Moon) In Other Words" (Bart Howard) – 3:44
10. "You and the Night and the Music" (Arthur Schwartz, Howard Dietz) – 2:35

== Personnel ==
- Anita O'Day − vocals (tracks 1, 3, 5, 7, 9 & 10)
- Gene Harris – piano
- Andrew Simpkins – bass
- Bill Dowdy – drums
- Roy Eldridge − trumpet (track 7)
