= Gershwin Live! =

Live album by Sarah Vaughan
- Released: 1982
- Recorded: February 1–2, 1982
- Venue: Dorothy Chandler Pavilion, Los Angeles
- Genre: Vocal jazz
- Length: 61:02
- Label: Columbia
- Producer: Steven Epstein

Sarah Vaughan chronology
| Crazy and Mixed Up (1982) | Gershwin Live! (1982) | The Planet Is Alive...Let it Live! (1984) |

Professional ratings
Review scores
| Source | Rating |
|---|---|
| Allmusic | 2.5/5 stars |
| The Rolling Stone Jazz Record Guide | 2/5 stars |

Gershwin Live! is a 1982 live album by Sarah Vaughan, of music composed by George Gershwin, accompanied by the Los Angeles Philharmonic, conducted by Michael Tilson Thomas. The album was arranged by Marty Paich.

Vaughan's performance won her the Grammy Award for Best Jazz Vocal Performance, Female at the Grammy Awards of 1983.

== Track listing ==
1. Overture: Porgy and Bess Medley: "Summertime"/"It Ain't Necessarily So" (George Gershwin, DuBose Heyward, Ira Gershwin)/"I Loves You, Porgy" (G. Gershwin, I. Gershwin, D. Heyward) – 7:52
2. Medley: "But Not for Me"/"Our Love Is Here to Stay"/"Embraceable You"/"Someone To Watch Over Me" – 9:39
3. "Sweet and Low Down" – 3:36
4. "Fascinating Rhythm" – 4:04
5. "Do It Again" (Buddy DeSylva, G. Gershwin) – 5:29
6. "My Man's Gone Now" (G. Gershwin, I. Gershwin, Heyward) – 5:51
7. "The Man I Love" – 10:03
8. Medley: "Nice Work If You Can Get It"/"They Can't Take That Away from Me"/"'S Wonderful"/"Swanee"/"Strike Up the Band" – 6:56
9. Encore: "I've Got a Crush on You"/"A Foggy Day" –– 7:35

All songs composed by George Gershwin, with lyrics by Ira Gershwin, unless otherwise noted.

== Personnel ==
- Sarah Vaughan – vocals
- George Gaffney – piano
- Andy Simpkins – double bass
- Harold Jones – drums
- The Los Angeles Philharmonic – other instruments
- Michael Tilson Thomas – piano, conductor, co-arranger on "The Man I Love"
- Marty Paich – arranger
