= Crazy and Mixed Up =

Studio album by Sarah Vaughan
- Released: 1982
- Recorded: March 1–2, 1982
- Genre: Jazz
- Length: 33:19
- Label: Pablo Today
- Producer: Sarah Vaughan

Sarah Vaughan chronology
Songs of the Beatles (1981)	Crazy and Mixed Up (1982)	Gershwin Live! (1982)

Crazy and Mixed Up is a 1982 studio album by the American jazz singer Sarah Vaughan.

Vaughan was nominated for the Grammy Award for Best Jazz Vocal Performance, Female at the 26th Annual Grammy Awards for her performance on this album.

== Reception ==
Professional ratings
Review scores
Source	Rating
AllMusic	4.5/5 stars
The Penguin Guide to Jazz Recordings	4/4 stars
The Rolling Stone Jazz Record Guide	5/5 stars

Reviewing the album for AllMusic, Scott Yanow wrote that "...even if the results are not all that unique, her voice is often in near-miraculous form. ...Sassy sounds in prime form, on such songs as 'I Didn't Know What Time It Was', 'Autumn Leaves', 'The Island' and 'You Are Too Beautiful'. It is hard to believe, listening to her still-powerful voice on this CD reissue, that she had already been a recording artist for 40 years". The Penguin Guide to Jazz Recordings considers the album to be possibly Vaughan’s best for the Pablo label.

== Track listing ==
1. "I Didn't Know What Time It Was" (Richard Rodgers, Lorenz Hart) – 4:02
2. "That's All" (Alan Brandt, Bob Haymes) – 4:04
3. "Autumn Leaves" (Joseph Kosma, Johnny Mercer, Jacques Prévert) – 5:36
4. "Love Dance" (Ivan Lins, Vítor Martins, Paul Williams) – 3:29
5. "The Island" (Alan Bergman, Marilyn Bergman, Lins, Martins) – 4:30
6. "Seasons" (Roland Hanna) – 5:20
7. "In Love in Vain" (Jerome Kern, Leo Robin) – 3:09
8. "You Are Too Beautiful" (Rodgers, Hart) – 3:36

== Personnel ==
- Sarah Vaughan – vocals
- Roland Hanna – piano
- Joe Pass – guitar
- Andy Simpkins – double bass
- Harold Jones – drums
