= Mary Stallings =

American singer

- Born: August 16, 1939 (age 87); San Francisco, California, U.S.
- Genres: Vocal jazz
- Occupation: Singer
- Years active: 1950s–present
- Labels: Concord Jazz, Maxjazz, Half Note, HighNote
- Website: www.marystallingsjazz.com

Mary Stallings (born August 16, 1939) is an American jazz vocalist and mother of soul singer Adriana Evans.

== Biography ==
One of eleven children, Mary Stallings was born in San Francisco, California. She grew up in the neighborhood of Laurel Heights, singing in the black gospel choir of the First African Methodist Episcopal Zion Church. By her teens, Stallings began singing in San Francisco night clubs such as the Hungry i, The Purple Onion, and El Matador. She performed with Ben Webster, Cal Tjader, Earl Hines, Red Mitchell, Teddy Edwards, and the Montgomery brothers (Wes, Monk, and Buddy).

Before graduating from high school, she joined R&B singer Louis Jordan's Tympani Five. In the early 1960s, she performed with Dizzy Gillespie at the Black Hawk nightclub in San Francisco and with Gillespie at the 1965 Monterey Jazz Festival.

She collaborated with vibraphonist Cal Tjader on the album Cal Tjader Plays, Mary Stallings Sings for Fantasy Records. Engagements in Tokyo, Manila and Bangkok ensued, along with work up and down the West Coast. She spent a year in the late 1960s performing in Nevada with Billy Eckstine and toured South America with Gillespie's band in 1965 and 1966. From 1969–1972, she had a three-year residency as singer for the Count Basie Orchestra. In 1972, in semi-retirement, she gave birth to her only child, R&B singer Adriana Evans.

Stallings returned to singing at the end of the 1980s and came to the attention of the national jazz audience with the 1994 release of I Waited for You for Concord Jazz with pianist Gene Harris's quartet, featuring Ron Escheté (guitar), Luther Hughes (bass), and Paul Humphrey (drums). Her album Spectrum (1995) features pianist Gerald Wiggins, Ron Escheté (guitar), Andy Simpkins (bass), and Paul Humphrey (drums). Trumpeter Harry "Sweets" Edison contributes to six tunes. In Manhattan Moods (1997), Stallings is backed by pianist Monty Alexander, bassist Ben Wolfe and drummer Clyd Lucas, while Hendrik Meurkens adds harmonica work on two tracks and plays vibes on "He Was Too Good to Me." Dick Oatts plays flute on "How High the Moon" and "He Was." Though often thought as a Dinah Washington disciple, Stallings's emulation of Billie Holiday shows up on "Ghost of a Chance" and "You Go to My Head."

Remember Love (2005) was produced by Geri Allen, who also plays piano and organ. The album peaked at No. 23 on the Billboard chart.

Mary Stallings has played at the Monterey Jazz Festival in 1965, 1995, 2003 and 2013. The San Francisco Jazz Festival 2001, 2004, and 2006 was backed by the 15-piece Marcus Shelby Jazz Orchestra with pianist Geri Allen She performed in 2005 with Clark Terry at the Blue Note Jazz Club in New York. The 2007 Georgia's Savannah Music Festival accompanied by the Eric Reed Trio with Wycliffe Gordon. Jazz at Lincoln Center (2007), The Birth of Cool, highlighted Stalling's interpretation of the Billie Holiday standards "Pennies from Heaven" and "Laughing at Life."

== Awards ==
- 2006 SFJAZZ Beacon Award

== Discography ==
- Cal Tjader Plays, Mary Stallings Sings (Fantasy, 1962; CD reissue: OJC, 2005)
- Fine And Mellow (Clarity, 1990)
- I Waited For You (Concord, 1994) - with Gene Harris
- Spectrum (Concord, 1996) - with Gerald Wiggins
- Manhattan Moods (Concord, 1997) - with Monty Alexander
- Trust Your Heart (Clarity, 2000) - recorded 1990
- Live At The Village Vanguard (MAXJAZZ, 2001) - with Eric Reed
- Remember Love (Half Note, 2005) - with Geri Allen
- Dream (HighNote, 2010) - with Eric Reed
- Don't Look Back (HighNote, 2012) - with Eric Reed
- But Beautiful (HighNote, 2013) - with Eric Reed
- Feelin' Good (HighNote, 2015) - with Bruce Barth
- Songs Were Made to Sing (Smoke Sessions, 2019)
