= Good Deal =

Studio album by the 3 Sounds
- Released: March 1960
- Recorded: May 20, 1959
- Studio: Van Gelder Studio; Hackensack, New Jersey
- Genre: Jazz
- Length: 41:52
- Label: Blue Note; BLP 4020
- Producer: Alfred Lion

The Three Sounds chronology
Bottoms Up! (1959)	Good Deal (1960)	Moods (1960)

Good Deal is the third album by American jazz trio The 3 Sounds recorded on May 20, 1959 and released on Blue Note the following year.

== Release history ==
Like the majority of the band's albums, it has been released on CD only in Japan, as a limited edition.

== Reception ==
Professional ratings
Review scores
Source	Rating
AllMusic	3/5 stars

The AllMusic review by Stephen Thomas Erlewine stated: "Good Deal is a typically fine record from the Three Sounds, who were beginning to hit their stride when this session was recorded in May 1959. Like most of their records, it's laidback — even when the group works a swinging tempo, there's a sense of ease that keeps the mood friendly, relaxed and mellow".

== Track listing ==
All compositions by Gene Harris, except as indicated

=== Side 1 ===
1. "Robbins Nest" – 6:15 (Illinois Jacquet, Charles Thompson)
2. "Don't Blame Me" (Fields, McHugh) – 5:16
3. "St. Thomas" (Sonny Rollins) – 4:23
4. "Down the Track" – 5:27

=== Side 2 ===
1. "Tracy's Blues" – 3:38
2. "That's All" (Alan Brandt, Haymes) – 6:00
3. "Satin Doll" (Ellington, Mercer, Strayhorn) – 5:55
4. "Soft Winds" (Henderson, Frank Royal) – 4:58

== Personnel ==
=== The 3 Sounds ===
- Gene Harris – piano
- Andrew Simpkins – bass
- Bill Dowdy – drums

=== Technical personnel ===
- Alfred Lion – producer
- Rudy Van Gelder – recording engineer, mastering
- Reid Miles – design
- Francis Wolff – photography
- Ira Gitler – liner notes
