= Vibrations (The Three Sounds album) =

Studio album by The Three Sounds
- Released: End of January 1967
- Recorded: October 25, 1966
- Studio: Van Gelder Studio, Englewood Cliffs, NJ
- Genre: Jazz
- Length: 37:13
- Label: Blue Note; BST 84248

The Three Sounds chronology
Today's Sounds (1966)	Vibrations (1967)	Live at the Lighthouse (1967)

Vibrations is an album by jazz group The Three Sounds featuring performances recorded in 1966 and released on the Blue Note label.

== Reception ==
The Allmusic review by Stephen Thomas Erlewine awarded the album 3 stars stating "Vibrations doesn't make the first rank of Three Sounds records because the performances are a little stiff, and the infrequent organ sounds a little awkward. There are certainly plenty of good things here -- and there are more good than bad things -- but Vibrations primarily offers the kind of pleasures that are only meaningful to dedicated fans".

Professional ratings
Review scores
Source	Rating
Allmusic	3/5 stars

== Track listing ==
1. "The Frown" (Gene Harris) - 3:29
2. "Fever" (Eddie Cooley, Davenport) - 2:36
3. "Let's Go Get Stoned" (Joey Armstead, Ashford, Simpson) - 3:13
4. "Something You Got" (Chris Kenner) - 2:36
5. "Yeh Yeh" (Grant, Hendricks, Patrick) - 3:54
6. "It Was a Very Good Year" (Drake) - 2:44
7. "The Lamp Is Low" (de Rose, Parish, Ravel, Shefter) - 5:05
8. "Yours Is My Heart Alone" (Ludwig Herzer, Lehár, Löhner) - 4:02
9. "Django" (Lewis) - 5:30
10. "Charade" (Mancini, Mercer) - 4:04

== Personnel ==
- Gene Harris - piano, organ
- Andrew Simpkins - bass
- Kalil Madi - drums
