= Work Song (Nat Adderley album) =

Studio album by Nat Adderley
- Released: 1960
- Recorded: January 25 & 27, 1960
- Genre: Jazz, hard bop
- Label: Riverside

Nat Adderley chronology
Much Brass (1959)	Work Song (1960)	That's Right! (1960)

Work Song is an album by jazz cornetist Nat Adderley, recorded in January 1960 and released on the Riverside label. It features Adderley with Bobby Timmons, Wes Montgomery, Sam Jones, Percy Heath, Keter Betts and Louis Hayes in various combinations from a trio to a sextet, with the unusual sound of pizzicato cello to the fore on some tracks.

The title tune was given lyrics and covered the same year by Oscar Brown Jr. on his album sin & soul and has become a standard in both vocal and instrumental forms. It has also been covered in French by Claude Nougaro as "Sing Sing song".

== Reception ==
The album is recognised as one of Adderley's finest. The AllMusic review by Scott Yanow called it a "near-classic" and stated that "Nat Adderley is heard throughout in peak form, playing quite lyrically. Highly recommended". The Penguin Guide to Jazz awarded the album 4 stars, stating: "Work Song is the real classic, of course, laced with a funky blues feel but marked by some unexpectedly lyrical playing." Colin Larkin awarded the album 4 stars (excellent) in The Virgin Encyclopedia of 60s Music, calling it "a brilliant amalgam of the soul jazz".

Professional ratings
Review scores
Source	Rating
AllMusic	4.5/5 stars
The Penguin Guide to Jazz	4/4 stars
The Rolling Stone Jazz Record Guide	3/5 stars
The Virgin Encyclopedia of 60s Music	4/5 stars

== Track listing ==
All compositions by Nat Adderley except where noted.

1. "Work Song" (Nat Adderley, Oscar Brown Jr) – 4:15
2. "Pretty Memory" (Bobby Timmons) – 3:54
3. "I've Got a Crush on You" (George Gershwin, Ira Gershwin) – 2:55
4. "Mean to Me" (Fred E. Ahlert, Roy Turk) – 5:01
5. "Fallout" – 4:54
6. "Sack of Woe" (Julian Adderley) – 4:28
7. "My Heart Stood Still" (Lorenz Hart, Richard Rodgers) – 6:25
8. "Violets for Your Furs" (Tom Adair, Matt Dennis) – 3:50
9. "Scrambled Eggs" (Sam Jones) – 3:20

- Recorded at Reeves Sound Studios in New York City on January 25, 1960 (tracks 2, 4, 5 & 7) and January 27, 1960 (tracks 1, 3, 6, 8 & 9)

== Personnel ==
- Nat Adderley – Cornet
- Wes Montgomery – guitar
- Bobby Timmons – piano (tracks 1, 2, 5, 6 & 9)
- Percy Heath – bass (tracks 1, 6 & 9)
- Keter Betts – bass (tracks 2, 4 & 5), cello (tracks 7)
- Sam Jones – bass (tracks 3, 7 & 8), cello (tracks 1, 2, 5, 6 & 9)
- Louis Hayes – drums (tracks 1, 2, 4-7 & 9)
