= Babe's Blues =

Album by The Three Sounds

Studio album by The Three Sounds
- Released: 1986
- Recorded: August 13, 1961 and March 8, 1962
- Studio: Van Gelder Studio, Englewood Cliffs, NJ
- Genre: Jazz
- Length: 42:37
- Label: Blue Note; BST 84434
- Producer: Alfred Lion

The Three Sounds chronology
Hey There (1961)	Babe's Blues (1986)	Out of This World (1962)

Babe's Blues is an album by jazz group The Three Sounds featuring performances recorded in 1961 with one additional track from 1962 but not released on the Blue Note label until 1986. The title track is a composition by Randy Weston.

== Reception ==
The Allmusic review by Scott Yanow awarded the album 4 1/2 stars, stating: "The popular Three Sounds perform mostly standards on the album, infusing their swinging music with funk, soul, and sincere feeling". The All About Jazz review by Douglas Payne stated: "Harris, aided by smooth, sympathetic bassist Andy Simpkins and subtle drummer Bill Dowdy, are in top form here, like a hip hotel lounge band with a wicked sense of the blues. Harris plumbs his specialty throughout, wresting the blues out of even the most mundane of tunes".

Professional ratings
Review scores
Source	Rating
Allmusic	4.5/5 stars

== Track listing ==
All compositions by Gene Harris except as indicated

1. "Babe's Blues" (Randy Weston) - 4:37
2. "Wait a Minute" - 2:17
3. "Work Song" (Nat Adderley) - 3:23
4. "Blue Daniel" - 3:46
5. "Sweet and Lovely" (Gus Arnheim, H. Tobias, Jules LeMare) - 7:25
6. "Shiny Stockings" (Frank Foster) - 3:14
7. "Walking the Floor Over You" (Ernest Tubb) - 2:46
8. "Between the Devil and the Deep Blue Sea" (Harold Arlen, Ted Koehler) - 3:37
9. "Stairway to the Stars" (Matty Malneck, Mitchell Parish, Frank Signorelli) - 6:41
10. "Lazy Cat" - 4:51

Recorded on August 13, 1961 (2–10) and March 8, 1962 (1).

== Personnel ==
- Gene Harris - piano
- Andrew Simpkins - bass
- Bill Dowdy - drums
