= Andy Simpkins =

American jazz bassist (1932–1999)

- Born: Andrew Simpkins; April 29, 1932; Richmond, Indiana
- Died: June 2, 1999 (aged 67) Los Angeles, California
- Genres: jazz
- Instrument: bassist
- Formerly of: The 3 Sounds

Andrew Simpkins (April 29, 1932 – June 2, 1999) was an American jazz bassist.

Born in Richmond, Indiana, he first became known as a member of the group The Three Sounds, with which he performed from 1956 to 1968. After that, until 1974, he was a member of pianist George Shearing's group, and from 1979 to 1989 toured with singer Sarah Vaughan. Throughout and after that time, during which he settled in Los Angeles, Simpkins became respected as a top-quality bassist and widely known as a solid and reliable studio musician. He performed with singers Carmen McRae and Anita O'Day, instrumentalists Gerald Wiggins, Monty Alexander, Buddy DeFranco, Don Menza, and Stéphane Grappelli, and many others. He recorded three albums as a leader. He also played acoustic bass on the 1997 covers album In a Metal Mood: No More Mr. Nice Guy by artist Pat Boone.

Simpkins died of stomach cancer in Los Angeles.

== Discography ==
With The Three Sounds

- 1958: Introducing the 3 Sounds
- 1958: Branching Out with Nat Adderley
- 1959: Bottoms Up!
- 1959: LD + 3 with Lou Donaldson
- 1959: Good Deal
- 1960: Moods
- 1960: Feelin' Good
- 1960: Here We Come
- 1960: It Just Got to Be
- 1960: Blue Hour with Stanley Turrentine
- 1961: Hey There
- 1961: Babe's Blues
- 1962: Out of This World
- 1962: Black Orchid
- 1962: Blue Genes
- 1962: Anita O'Day & the Three Sounds with Anita O'Day
- 1963: The Three Sounds Play Jazz on Broadway
- 1963: Some Like It Modern
- 1964: Live at the Living Room
- 1964: Three Moods
- 1965: Beautiful Friendship
- 1966: Today's Sounds
- 1966: Vibrations
- 1967: Live at the Lighthouse
- 1968: Coldwater Flat
- 1968: Elegant Soul
- 1998: Standards

With Pat Boone

- In a Metal Mood: No More Mr. Nice Guy (Hip-O, 1997)

With Kenny Burrell

- Up the Street, 'Round the Corner, Down the Block (Fantasy, 1974)
- Heritage (AudioSource, 1980)

With Benny Carter

- My Kind of Trouble (Pablo, 1989)

With Natalie Cole

- Unforgettable... with Love (Elektra, 1991)

With Teddy Edwards

- Blue Saxophone (Verve, 1993)

With Victor Feldman

- Merry Olde Soul (Riverside, 1961)

With Barbara Morrison

- Visit Me (Chartmaker, 1999)

With Robert Palmer

- Ridin' High (EMI, 1992)

With Lalo Schifrin

- Ins and Outs (Palo Alto, 1982)

With George Shearing and Stéphane Grappelli

- The Reunion (MPS, 1976)

With Mary Stallings

- Spectrum (Concord, 1996)

With The Temptations

- For Lovers Only (Motown, 1995)

With Toni Tennille

- More Than You Know (Mirage, 1984)
- Do It Again (USA Music Group, 1988)

With Sarah Vaughan

- The Duke Ellington Songbook, Vol. 1 (Pablo, 1979)
- Copacabana (Pablo, 1979)
- Send in the Clowns (Pablo, 1981)
- Crazy and Mixed Up (Pablo, 1982)
- Gershwin Live! (Columbia, 1982)

With Joe Williams and George Shearing

- The Heart and Soul of Joe Williams and George Shearing (Sheba, 1971)
