= Out of This World (The Three Sounds album) =

Studio album by The Three Sounds
- Released: April 1966
- Recorded: February 4 and March 7–8, 1962
- Genre: Jazz
- Length: 40:50
- Label: Blue Note
- Producer: Alfred Lion

The Three Sounds chronology
Babe's Blues (1961-62)	Out of This World (1966)	Black Orchid (1962)

Out of This World is an album by jazz group The Three Sounds featuring performances recorded in 1962 and released on the Blue Note label.

== Reception ==
The Allmusic review by Stephen Thomas Erlewine awarded the album 4 stars stating "Out of This World relies less on originals than before, concentrating on standards which sound startlingly fresh. It's the loose, flexible groove that's the key... It's hard to sound this light and easy, and the Three Sounds pull it off with grace".

Professional ratings
Review scores
Source	Rating
Allmusic	4/5 stars

== Track listing ==
All compositions by Gene Harris except as indicated

1. "Girl of My Dreams" (Sunny Clapp) - 3:00
2. "Out of the Past" - 6:30 (Benny Golson)
3. "Just in Time" (Betty Comden, Adolph Green, Jule Styne) - 6:15
4. "I'll Be Around" (Alec Wilder) - 3:40
5. "My Silent Love" (Edward Heyman, Dana Suesse) - 7:00
6. "Sanctified Sue" - 3:35
7. "Out of This World" (Harold Arlen, Johnny Mercer) - 6:30
8. "You Make Me Feel So Young" (Mack Gordon, Josef Myrow) - 4:20
9. "Over the Rainbow" (Harold Arlen, Yip Harburg) - 4:51 Bonus track on CD reissue
10. "I'll Be Around" [Long Version] (Wilder) - 7:02 Bonus track on CD reissue

- Recorded at Rudy Van Gelder Studio, Englewood Cliffs, New Jersey on February 4 (tracks 1, 3 & 7), March 7 (tracks 4 & 8–10), and March 8 (tracks 2, 5 & 6), 1962

== Personnel ==
- Gene Harris - piano
- Andrew Simpkins - bass
- Bill Dowdy - drums
