= Here We Come (The Three Sounds album) =

Studio album by The Three Sounds
- Released: February 1962
- Recorded: December 13–14, 1960
- Studio: Van Gelder Studio, Englewood Cliffs. NJ
- Genre: Jazz
- Length: 38:42
- Label: Blue Note; BST 84088
- Producer: Alfred Lion

The Three Sounds chronology
Feelin' Good (1960)	Here We Come (1962)	It Just Got to Be (1960)

Here We Come is an album by jazz group The Three Sounds, featuring performances recorded in 1960 and released on the Blue Note label.

== Reception ==
Professional ratings
Review scores
Source	Rating
Allmusic	3/5 stars

The Allmusic review by Stephen Thomas Erlewine awarded the album 3 stars, stating "Here We Come is a typically classy and entertaining collection from the Three Sounds... overall the album has a warm, relaxed vibe that makes the romanticism particularly welcoming."

== Track listing ==
1. "Now's the Time" (Parker) - 5:43
2. "Summertime" (George Gershwin, Ira Gershwin, DuBose Heyward) - 5:34
3. "Here We Come" (Gene Harris) - 4:36
4. "Just Squeeze Me" (Duke Ellington, Lee Gaines) - 4:20
5. "Broadway" (Billy Bird, Teddy McRae, Henri Woode) - 3:55
6. "Our Love Is Here to Stay" (Gershwin) - 4:23
7. "Poinciana" (Bernier, Nat Simon) - 5:28
8. "Sonnymoon for Two" (Rollins) - 4:43

Recorded on December 13 (tracks 2, 3, 7 & 8) and December 14 (tracks 1 & 4–6), 1960

== Personnel ==
- Gene Harris - piano
- Andrew Simpkins - bass
- Bill Dowdy - drums
