= Bill Dowdy =

American drummer

- Born: August 15, 1932; Osceola, Arkansas, United States
- Died: May 12, 2017 (aged 84)
- Genres: Jazz
- Occupation(s): Musician, teacher
- Instrument(s): Drums, piano
- Years active: 1949-1970s
- Formerly of: The Three Sounds; Lester Young; Lou Donaldson; Nat Adderley; Johnny Griffin; Anita O'Day; Sonny Stitt

Bill Dowdy (August 15, 1932 – May 12, 2017) was an American jazz musician and teacher. He was the drummer with the jazz trio, The Three Sounds. The Three Sounds recorded over ten jazz albums from the 1950s through the early 1970s and played with Lester Young, Lou Donaldson, Nat Adderley, Johnny Griffin, Anita O'Day and Sonny Stitt among others.

== Biography ==
Bill Dowdy was born in Osceola, Arkansas. He moved with his family to Benton Harbor, Michigan when he was six months old. At a young age he would beat on things as if he were playing the drums, an indication of his future musical career. In high school he learned to play the piano and the drums. He had a group called Club 49 Trio in 1949 which group played on the radio in Chicago.

After Dowdy started his own music group, he moved to Battle Creek and joined a band before being drafted by the Army. Afterwards he moved to Chicago and took private lessons to improve his musical skills. Over time Dowdy became a professional drummer, eventually playing with many blues bands. Dowdy continued traveling, from New York to Los Angeles, and from Canada to the south. His idols included Gene Krupa, Max Roach, and Roy Haynes.

Dowdy died on May 12, 2017.

== Discography ==
With The Three Sounds

- 1958: Introducing the 3 Sounds (Blue Note)
- 1958: Branching Out (Blue Note) with Nat Adderley
- 1959: Bottoms Up! (Blue Note)
- 1959: LD + 3 (Blue Note) with Lou Donaldson
- 1959: Good Deal (Blue Note)
- 1960: Moods (Blue Note)
- 1960: Feelin' Good (Blue Note)
- 1960: Here We Come (Blue Note)
- 1960: It Just Got to Be (Blue Note)
- 1960: Blue Hour (Blue Note) with Stanley Turrentine
- 1961: Hey There (Blue Note)
- 1961: Babe's Blues (Blue Note)
- 1962: Out of This World (Blue Note)
- 1962: Black Orchid (Blue Note)
- 1959/62: Standards released 1998
- 1962: Blue Genes (Verve)
- 1963: Anita O'Day & the Three Sounds (Verve)
- 1963: The Three Sounds Play Jazz on Broadway (Mercury)
- 1963: Some Like It Modern (Mercury)
- 1964: Live at the Living Room (Mercury)
- 1965: Three Moods (Limelight)
- 1965: Beautiful Friendship (Limelight)

== Notes ==
- The Encyclopedia of Jazz. Leonard G. Feather. 1984. P. 185.
- The Giants of Jazz Piano. Backbeat Books. 2001. P. 184–186. "(History of the Three Sounds)"
