= Beautiful Friendship (The Three Sounds album) =

Studio album by The Three Sounds
- Released: 1965
- Recorded: July and August 1965
- Studio: Los Angeles, CA
- Genre: Jazz
- Length: 30:09
- Label: Limelight; LM 82026/LS 86026
- Producer: Jack Tracy

The Three Sounds chronology
Three Moods (1963)	Beautiful Friendship (1965)	Today's Sounds (1966)

Beautiful Friendship is an album by The Three Sounds which was recorded in California in 1965 and released on the Limelight label.

== Reception ==
Professional ratings
Review scores
Source	Rating
AllMusic	2/5 stars

AllMusic's Ken Dryden noted, "This strangely packaged LP gives no indication that the trio is actually augmented by additional musicians, most of whom are unidentified, though Bud Shank, Buddy Collette and Larry Bunker are mentioned briefly in Leonard Feather's liner notes. Although this was the second collaboration between leader Gene Harris and arranger Julian Lee, it is far more commercial sounding than the group's earlier recordings for Blue Note. ... Harris shows brief flashes of inspiration at the piano, but Lee's rather dated charts and the lack of choice material make this long out of print LP one that even the most ardent fans of the Three Sounds can safely bypass".

== Track listing ==
1. "Shortnin' Bread" (James Whitcomb Riley) − 3:03
2. "Theme from Skyscraper" (Jimmy Van Heusen, Sammy Cahn) − 2:38
3. "It's a Blue World" (Chet Forrest, Bob Wright) − 3:15
4. "That Man" (Lonnie Hewitt) − 2:25
5. "Hittin' Another Jug" (Gene Harris) − 2:37
6. "Beautiful Friendship" (Donald Kahn, Stanley Styne) − 3:07
7. "Cute" (Neil Hefti) − 3:45
8. "She's Too Far Above Me" (David Heneker) − 3:04
9. "Hot Cha" (Willie Woods) − 2:05
10. "The Following Sea" (Jeri Sullivan) − 4:10

== Personnel ==
- Gene Harris − piano
- Andy Simpkins − bass
- Bill Dowdy − drums
- Additional unidentified musicians arranged by Julian Lee
