= Three Moods =

Studio album by The Three Sounds
- Released: 1965
- Recorded: February 24–25 and March 24–25, 1965
- Studio: Radio Recorders, Los Angeles, CA
- Genre: Jazz
- Length: 36:17
- Label: Limelight; LM 82014/LS 86014
- Producer: Jack Tracy

The Three Sounds chronology
Live at the Living Room (1964)	Three Moods (1965)	Beautiful Friendship (1965)

Three Moods is an album by The Three Sounds which was recorded in Los Angeles in 1965 and released on the Limelight label.

== Reception ==
Professional ratings
Review scores
Source	Rating
Allmusic	2/5 stars

Allmusic's Ken Dryden noted, "When the Three Sounds briefly left Blue Note for Limelight in the mid-'60s, there was a noticeable drop in the quality of their albums. This LP gives no indication from the cover that most tracks have additional strings or brass. ... The only memorable tracks recorded during these sessions feature the trio without any additional musicians ... There are many better recordings by the Three Sounds".

== Track listing ==
All compositions by Gene Harris except where noted

1. "Change Partners" (Irving Berlin) − 4:20
2. "Invitation" (Bronisław Kaper, Paul Francis Webster) − 4:27
3. "The Second Time Around" (Jimmy Van Heusen, Sammy Cahn) − 3:26
4. "The Night Has a Thousand Eyes" (Jerry Brainin, Buddy Bernier) − 4:03
5. "You've Changed" (Bill Carey, Carl Fischer) − 3:06
6. "What Now My Love" (Gilbert Bécaud, Carl Sigman) − 3:50
7. "Hittin' the Jug" (Richard Carpenter) − 3:50
8. "John Brown's Body" (Traditional) − 4:04
9. "Justerini" − 2:20
10. "Our Theme" − 3:07

== Personnel ==
- Gene Harris − piano
- Andy Simpkins − bass
- Bill Dowdy − drums
- Milt Bernhart, Gil Falco, Lew McCreary, George Oliver, Tommy Shepherd, Kenny Shroyer − trombone (tracks 6–9)
- Leonard Atkins, Harry Bluestone, Sam Caplan, John DeVoogdt, Lou Kievman, Alfred Lustgarten, Alexander Neiman, Kurt Reher, Joseph Saxon, Darrel Terwilliger − strings (tracks 1–4)
- Julian Lee – arranger
