= Blue Genes (album) =

Studio album by The Three Sounds
- Released: 1963
- Recorded: October 12, 13, 14 & 15, 1962
- Studio: Van Gelder Studio, Englewood Cliffs, NJ
- Genre: Jazz
- Length: 29:16
- Label: Verve; V/V6 8513
- Producer: Creed Taylor

The Three Sounds chronology
Standards (1959/62)	Blue Genes (1963)	Anita O'Day & the Three Sounds (1963)

Blue Genes is an album by The Three Sounds recorded for the Verve label in late 1962.

Professional ratings
Review scores
Source	Rating
Allmusic	4.5/5 stars
New Record Mirror	3/5 stars

== Track listing ==
1. "Mr. Wonderful" (Jerry Bock, George David Weiss, Larry Holofcener) − 5:28
2. "Autumn in New York" (Vernon Duke) − 5:54
3. "Love Somebody" (William E. Curry) − 4:08
4. "Blue Genes" (Gene Harris) − 3:46
5. "Red Sails in the Sunset" (Hugh Williams, Jimmy Kennedy) − 3:37
6. "In a Mellow Tone" (Duke Ellington) − 4:55
7. "Gina, My Love" (Harris) − 3:00
8. "Whims of Chamberland" (Paul Chambers) − 3:53

== Personnel ==
- Gene Harris - piano
- Andrew Simpkins - bass
- Bill Dowdy - drums
