= Introducing the 3 Sounds =

Studio album by the 3 Sounds
- Released: December 1958
- Recorded: September 16 & 18, 1958
- Studio: Van Gelder Studio; Hackensack, New Jersey
- Genre: Jazz
- Length: 38:05 (LP); 67:29 (CD)
- Label: Blue Note; BLP 1600
- Producer: Alfred Lion

The 3 Sounds chronology
Introducing the 3 Sounds (1958)	LD+3 (1959)

Introducing the 3 Sounds is the debut album by American jazz piano trio The 3 Sounds, recorded on September 16 & 18, 1958 and released on Blue Note in December that year. The trio features Gene Harris, Andrew Simpkins and Bill Dowdy.

== Background ==
The CD reissue includes five bonus tracks and one alternate take originally issued in Japan as Introducing the 3 Sounds Volume 2. It was a continuation of the Blue Note 1500 series being numbered 1600. A few other albums were made intended for release as 1601, 1602, etc., but were not released at the time. Blue Note albums resumed with BLP (8)4001, (8)4002, etc., the 8 designating stereo.

== Reception ==
Professional ratings
Review scores
Source	Rating
AllMusic	5/5 stars
DownBeat	0/5 stars

The AllMusic review by Stephen Thomas Erlewine states:

The Three Sounds never really deviated from the sound they established on Introducing, but that's one of the things that is so remarkable—they were fully formed on their very first album. Even if it was a peak, it wasn't the only peak in their career. They would often match the heights of this album, but this debut remains a shining jewel in their catalog, and the way to become acquainted with their sound.

== Track listing ==
All tracks are written by Gene Harris, except as noted.

Side 1
No.	Title	Writer(s)	Date recorded	Length
1.	"Tenderly"	Walter Gross, Jack Lawrence	September 16, 1958	4:36
2.	"Willow Weep for Me"	Ann Ronell	September 16, 1958	4:42
3.	"Both Sides"		September 16, 1958	4:41
4.	"Blue Bells"		September 18, 1958	4:25

Side 2
No.	Title	Writer(s)	Date recorded	Length
1.	"It's Nice"		September 16, 1958	4:39
2.	"Goin' Home"	Traditional	September 18, 1958	3:54
3.	"Woody 'n' You"	Gillespie	September 18, 1958	7:12
4.	"'O Sole Mio"	Giovanni Capurro, Eduardo di Capua	September 18, 1958	3:56

CD reissue bonus tracks
No.	Title	Writer(s)	Date recorded	Length
9.	"Bobby"		September 16, 1958	4:26
10.	"Mo-Ge"		September 16, 1958	4:25
11.	"It Might as Well Be Spring"	Hammerstein II, Rodgers	September 18, 1958	6:33
12.	"Soft Touch"		September 16, 1958	3:43
13.	"Don't Get Around Much Anymore"	Ellington	September 18, 1958	4:39
14.	"Goin' Home" (alternate take)		September 18, 1958	5:38

== Personnel ==
=== The 3 Sounds ===
- Gene Harris – piano, celeste ("Blue Bells", "Goin' Home")
- Andrew Simpkins – bass
- Bill Dowdy – drums

=== Technical personnel ===
- Alfred Lion – producer
- Rudy Van Gelder – recording engineer, mastering
- Reid Miles – design
- Francis Wolff – photography
- Leonard Feather – liner notes
