= Elegant Soul =

Studio album by The Three Sounds
- Released: September 21, 1968
- Recorded: September 19–20, 1968
- Genre: Jazz-funk
- Length: 36:27
- Label: Blue Note
- Producer: Monk Higgins, Dee Ervin

The Three Sounds chronology
Coldwater Flat (1968)	Elegant Soul (1968)	Soul Symphony (1969)

Elegant Soul is an album by jazz group The Three Sounds featuring performances with an orchestra arranged by Monk Higgins recorded in 1968 and released on the Blue Note label.

== Reception ==
The Allmusic review by Thom Jurek awarded the album 3½ stars stating "Elegant Soul was -- and could even be currently -- dismissed with a casual listen as lightweight pop with a compelling rhythmic sense. But that would be selling it way short. This album warrants close listening to discern all that's happening in its production and arrangements. Whether it's on the dancefloor, for sampling, for feel-good or deep listening, or for finger-popping, it satisfies on all levels".

Professional ratings
Review scores
Source	Rating
Allmusic	3.5/5 stars

== Track listing ==
1. "Elegant Soul" (Virginia P. Bland) - 3:15
2. "Do It Right Now" (Bland) - 6:20
3. "Sittin' Duck" (Monk Higgins) - 9:18
4. "(Sock It to Me) Harper Valley P.T.A." (Tom T. Hall) - 2:48
5. "Sugar Hill" (Dee Ervin, Miles Grayson) - 2:48
6. "African Sweets" (Ervin) - 4:30
7. "Black Gold" (Grayson) - 3:29
8. "Book of Slim" (Higgins) - 3:26
9. "Walls of Respect" (Gene Harris, Higgins) - 3:13
- Recorded at RPM Studios, Los Angeles, California on September 19 (tracks 3, 4 & 8) and September 20 (tracks 1, 2, 5–7 & 9), 1968

== Personnel ==
- Gene Harris - piano, organ
- Andrew Simpkins - bass
- Carl Burnett, Paul Humphrey - drums
- Monk Higgins - arranger, conductor
- Jim Horn - flute
- Bob Jung - reeds
- Dave Burk, Jesse Erlich, Henry Felber, Ron Fulsom, Louis Kievman, William Kurash, Leonard Malarsky, Ralph Schaeffer, Albert Steinberg, Tibor Zelig - violin
- Phil Goldberg, Leonard Selic - viola
- Jerry Kessler - cello
- Alan Estes - vibes
- Al Vescovo - guitar
- Dee Ervin, Miles Grayson - percussion
