= Live at the 'It Club' =

Live album by Gene Harris and The Three Sounds
- Released: 1996
- Recorded: March 6, 1970
- Venues: The 'It Club', Hollywood, CA
- Genre: Jazz
- Length: 58:15
- Labels: Blue Note; B1-35338
- Producer: Monk Higgins

The Three Sounds chronology
Soul Symphony (1963)	Live at the 'It Club' (1996)	Live at the 'It Club' Volume 2 (1996)

Live at the 'It Club' is a live album by Gene Harris and The Three Sounds which was recorded in California in 1970 but not released on the Blue Note label until 1996.

== Reception ==
Professional ratings
Review scores
Source	Rating
AllMusic	3/5 stars

Allmusic's Stephen Thomas Erlewine noted, "Live At the "It Club" shows the Three Sounds pulling out funky, gritty rhythms out of their basic bluesy hard-bop sound. The group's funky influences are most noticeable in the rhythm section of drummer Carl Burnette and bassist Henry Franklin, who had been playing with Harris for only a short time when this set was recorded. The rhythm section pushes Harris, making the music loose and swinging -- the groove matters more than anything on the album. Occasionally, the energy of the Three Sounds lags, but Live at the "It Club" is an enjoyable piece of grooving soul-jazz".

== Track listing ==
All compositions by Gene Harris except where noted

1. "Funky Pullett" (Monk Higgins) − 7:40
2. "I'm Still Sad" − 8:45
3. "On Green Dolphin Street" (Bronisław Kaper, Ned Washington) − 7:20 Additional track on CD release
4. "Baby Man" (Higgins) − 5:20
5. "Love for Sale" (Cole Porter) − 8:00
6. "Sittin' Duck" (Higgins) − 7:30
7. "Tammy's Breeze" − 5:40 Additional track on CD release
8. "John Brown's Body" (Traditional) − 8:00 Additional track on CD release

== Personnel ==
- Gene Harris − piano
- Henry Franklin − bass
- Carl Burnett − drums
