= Standards (The Three Sounds album) =

Studio album by The Three Sounds
- Released: 1998
- Recorded: October 8, 1959; February 4 and June 27–28, 1962
- Studio: Van Gelder Studio, Englewood Cliffs, NJ
- Genre: Jazz
- Length: 61:09
- Label: Blue Note
- Producer: Alfred Lion

The Three Sounds chronology
| Black Orchid (1964) | Standards (1998) | Blue Genes (1962) |

Standards is an album by jazz group The Three Sounds collecting performances recorded in 1959 and 1962 and originally released on the Blue Note label in 1998.

== Reception ==
Professional ratings
Review scores
| Source | Rating |
|---|---|
| Allmusic | 3/5 stars |
| The Penguin Guide to Jazz Recordings | 3/4 stars |

The Allmusic review by Scott Yanow stated: "The fact that the music is not in general as funky as usual may be why producer Alfred Lion did not release with the sessions when they were recorded. However, although not essential, the playing is enjoyable on its own terms". On All About Jazz, C. Michael Bailey said "Standards is full of Gene Harris' good-natured, hand-over-hand rolling blues playing. ... Harris is the star supported ably by Simpkins and Dowdy. While being the premier jazz-blues pianist, Harris' music is never dark or sinister. Gene Harris' music is always about sunshine and brightness".

== Track listing ==
1. "Makin' Whoopee" (Walter Donaldson, Gus Kahn) – 4:19
2. "Cry Me a River" (Arthur Hamilton) – 6:19
3. "Witchcraft" (Cy Coleman, Carolyn Leigh) – 6:26
4. "Again" (Lionel Newman, Dorcas Cochran) – 5:59
5. "Sometimes I'm Happy" (Vincent Youmans, Irving Caesar) – 5:16
6. "Stay as Sweet as You Are" (Harry Revel, Mack Gordon) – 3:09
7. "The Best Things in Life Are Free" (Ray Henderson, Lew Brown, Buddy DeSylva) – 4:57
8. "Red Sails in the Sunset" (Hugh Williams, Jimmy Kennedy) – 4:34
9. "Alone Together" (Arthur Schwartz, Howard Dietz) – 6:23
10. "Lights Out" (Billy Hill) – 5:47
11. "Thinking of You" (Harry Ruby, Bert Kalmar) – 4:37
12. "Goodnight, Ladies" (Edwin Pearce Christy) – 3:23
- Recorded at Van Gelder Studio in Englewood Cliffs, NJ on October 10, 1959 (tracks 9–12), February 4, 1962 (tracks 1 & 5), June 27, 1962 (tracks 2, 4, 7 & 8) and June 28, 1962 (tracks 3 & 6)

== Personnel ==
- Gene Harris - piano
- Andrew Simpkins - bass
- Bill Dowdy - drums
