= Some Like It Modern =

Studio album by The Three Sounds
- Released: 1963
- Recorded: July 17–18, 1963
- Studio: A & R Studios, New York City
- Genre: Jazz
- Length: 33:53
- Label: Mercury; MG 20839/SR 60839
- Producer: Quincy Jones

The Three Sounds chronology
The Three Sounds Play Jazz on Broadway (1962)	Some Like It Modern (1963)	Live at the Living Room (1964)

Some Like It Modern is an album by The Three Sounds which was recorded in New York in 1963 and released on the Mercury label.

Professional ratings
Review scores
Source	Rating
Allmusic	3/5 stars

== Track listing ==
All compositions by Gene Harris except where noted

1. "Caesar and Cleopatra" (Alex North) − 2:48
2. "After Hours" (Avery Parrish) − 2:45
3. "On the Sunny Side of the Street" (Jimmy McHugh, Dorothy Fields) − 2:58
4. "Mr. Lucky" (Henry Mancini) − 2:47
5. "I'm Gettin' Sentimental Over You" (George Bassman, Ned Washington) − 3:10
6. "Rat Down Front" − 3:10
7. "Lazy River" (Hoagy Carmichael, Sidney Arodin) − 2:12
8. "Sentimental Journey" (Les Brown, Ben Homer, Bud Green) − 3:29
9. "There's Something Nice About the Rain" − 2:35
10. "Let's Dance" (Gregory Stone, Josef Bonime, Fanny Baldridge) − 2:32
11. "Elbows and Armpits" − 5:13

== Personnel ==
- Gene Harris − piano
- Andy Simpkins − bass
- Bill Dowdy − drums
