= Songs of the Beatles =

Studio album by Sarah Vaughan
- Released: April 9, 1981
- Recorded: 1977
- Genres: Pop, R&B
- Length: 43:45
- Label: Atlantic
- Producers: Marty Paich and David Paich

Sarah Vaughan chronology
| Copacabana (1979) | Songs of the Beatles (1981) | Send in the Clowns (1981) |

Professional ratings
Review scores
| Source | Rating |
|---|---|
| AllMusic | 3/5 stars |
| Los Angeles Times | 3.5/5 stars |
| The Rolling Stone Jazz Record Guide | 1/5 stars |

Songs of the Beatles is a 1981 album by Sarah Vaughan, recorded in 1977 but not released for four years due to a recording contract problem. It contains songs written and originally performed by the Beatles, with contemporaneous pop and jazz arrangements. On "Something" Vaughan was accompanied by the Brazilian singer and musician Marcos Valle.

== Reception ==
On balance, Los Angeles Times jazz writer Leonard Feather is favorable in his assessment, awarding the album three and a half stars, notwithstanding some ill-advised commercial trimmings:

Recorded several years ago, inexplicably shelved and now belatedly released, this is neither the ill-advised venture one might fear nor a vital part of musical history. Produced and arranged by the father and son team of Marty and David Paich, it has its moments of superior Vaughan, notably on "Eleanor Rigby" and "Here, There and Everywhere." What went wrong is mostly the fault of the producers: overdressed arrangements ("Fool on the Hill"); overdubbed background singers of which Vaughan was not even made aware; a tiresome tenor sax and rigid rhythm on "Come Together." For the most part, though, on the strength of her indomitable musicianship and the inherent virtues of some of the tunes, Vaughan overcomes.

== Track listing ==
All songs written by Lennon–McCartney unless otherwise noted:

Side A

1. "Get Back" – 2:55
2. "And I Love Her" – 4:08
3. "Eleanor Rigby" – 3:48
4. "The Fool on the Hill" – 4:15
5. "You Never Give Me Your Money" – 2:48
6. "Come Together" – 3:22

Side B

1. "I Want You (She's So Heavy)" – 3:31
2. "Blackbird" – 3:34
3. "Something" (George Harrison) – 4:16
4. "Here, There and Everywhere" – 2:49
5. "The Long and Winding Road" – 3:08
6. "Yesterday" – 4:02
7. "Hey Jude" – 1:09

== Personnel ==
Recorded in 1977:

- Sarah Vaughan - vocals
- Bill Thedford, Perry Morgan, Jim Gilstrap - background vocals
- Marcos Valle - vocals on track 9
- David Hungate - bass guitar
- Bob Magnusson - string bass on track 5
- Michael Lang - keyboards
- Lee Ritenour, Dean Parks, Louie Shelton - guitar
- Steve Porcaro - synthesizer
- Jon Smith - tenor saxophone on tracks 6, 7
- Toots Thielemans - harmonica
- Jeff Porcaro - percussion, drums
- Bobbye Hall, Joe Porcaro, Steve Forman - percussion
- Marty Paich, David Paich - arranger, keyboards, producer
