= Bottoms Up! =

Studio album by The 3 Sounds
- Released: July/August 1959
- Recorded: September 16 & 28, 1958; February 11, 1959
- Studio: Van Gelder Studio; Hackensack, New Jersey
- Genre: Jazz
- Length: 39:43
- Label: Blue Note; BLP 4014
- Producer: Alfred Lion

The 3 Sounds chronology
LD+3 (1958)	Bottoms Up! (1959)	Good Deal (1959)

Bottoms Up! is the second album by American jazz trio The 3 Sounds, recorded on September 16 & 28, 1958 and February 11, 1959 and released on Blue Note in 1959.

== Reception ==
Professional ratings
Review scores
Source	Rating
AllMusic	3/5 stars

The AllMusic review by Scott Yanow states, "Pianist Gene Harris, bassist Andy Simpkins and drummer Bill Dowdy are in top form performing their brand of funky jazz, which left plenty of room for inventive solos along with the percolating grooves... Well worth searching for."

== Track listing ==
Side 1
No.	Title	Writer(s)	Date recorded	Length
1.	"Bésame Mucho"	Consuelo Velázquez	February 11, 1959	4:02
2.	"Angel Eyes"	Matt Dennis	September 16, 1958	5:10
3.	"Time After Time"	Sammy Cahn, Jule Styne	September 28, 1958	4:51
4.	"Love Walked In"	George Gershwin, Ira Gershwin	February 11, 1959	6:05

Side 2
No.	Title	Writer(s)	Date recorded	Length
1.	"I Could Write a Book"	Lorenz Hart, Richard Rodgers	February 11, 1959	4:52
2.	"Jinne Lou"	Gene Harris	February 11, 1959	4:54
3.	"Nothing Ever Changes My Love for You"	Marvin Fisher, Jack Segal	February 11, 1959	3:06
4.	"Falling in Love with Love"	Hart, Rodgers	September 16, 1958	6:43

== Personnel ==
=== The 3 Sounds ===
- Gene Harris – piano, celeste ("Jinne Lou")
- Andrew Simpkins – bass
- Bill Dowdy – drums

=== Technical personnel ===
- Alfred Lion – producer
- Rudy Van Gelder – recording engineer, mastering
- Reid Miles – design
- Francis Wolff – photography
- Leonard Feather – liner notes
