= The Three Sounds Play Jazz on Broadway =

Studio album by The Three Sounds
- Released: 1963
- Recorded: December 14–15, 1962
- Studio: Studio A of Conway Recorders, Hollywood, CA
- Genre: Jazz
- Length: 39:05
- Label: Mercury; MG 20776/SR 60776
- Producer: Quincy Jones

The Three Sounds chronology
Anita O'Day & the Three Sounds (1962)	The Three Sounds Play Jazz on Broadway (1963)	Some Like It Modern (1963)

The Three Sounds Play Jazz on Broadway is an album by The Three Sounds performing jazz versions of Broadway show tunes from No Strings, Stop the World – I Want to Get Off, Camelot, How to Succeed in Business Without Really Trying, Oliver! and The Sound of Music which was recorded in Los Angeles in late 1962 and released on the Mercury label.

Professional ratings
Review scores
Source	Rating
Allmusic	4/5 stars

== Track listing ==
1. "The Sweetest Sounds" (Richard Rodgers) − 2:44
2. "Gonna Build a Mountain" (Anthony Newley, Leslie Bricusse) − 2:13
3. "If Ever I Would Leave You" (Frederick Loewe, Alan Jay Lerner) − 3:00
4. "You Don't Tell Me" (Rodgers) − 2:51
5. "Once in a Lifetime" (Newley, Bricusse) − 3:30
6. "I Believe in You" (Frank Loesser) − 4:13
7. "What Kind of Fool Am I?" (Newley, Bricusse) − 2:53
8. "Someone Nice Like You" (Newley, Bricusse) − 3:43
9. "I'd Do Anything" (Lionel Bart) − 3:13
10. "Climb Ev'ry Mountain" (Rodgers, Oscar Hammerstein II) − 3:00
11. "Who Will Buy?" (Bart) − 3:40
12. "As Long As He Needs Me" (Bart) − 3:05

== Personnel ==
- Gene Harris − piano
- Andy Simpkins − bass
- Bill Dowdy − drums
