= Black Orchid (album) =

Studio album by The Three Sounds
- Released: April 1964
- Recorded: February 4, 1962 (#10, 12–13, 15); March 7, 1962 (#1–4 & 6); March 8, 1962 (#5, 7–8); June 27, 1962 (#9, 11)
- Studio: Van Gelder Studio, Englewood Cliffs, NJ
- Genre: Jazz
- Length: 42:37 original LP; 74:02 1998 CD reissue 69:53 2015 CD reissue
- Label: Blue Note; BST 84155
- Producer: Alfred Lion

The Three Sounds chronology
Out of This World (1962)	Black Orchid (1964)	Standards (1959/62)

Black Orchid is an album by jazz group The Three Sounds featuring performances recorded in 1962 and released on the Blue Note label. The 1998 limited CD reissue features another seven unissued tracks recorded at different sessions. It was also issued in Japan in 2015, on SHM-CD, featuring different bonus tracks recorded at the same sessions.

== Reception ==
The Allmusic review by Stephen Thomas Erlewine awarded the album 4 stars, stating "It displays their knack for deftly swinging uptempo numbers, light blues and sensitive standards. If anything, it swings a little harder and is a little more soulful than some of its predecessors".

Professional ratings
Review scores
Source	Rating
Allmusic	4/5 stars
The Penguin Guide to Jazz Recordings	3/4 stars

== Track listing ==
All compositions by Gene Harris except as noted

1. "Black Orchid" (Cal Tjader) - Erroneously credited to (Neal Hefti) - 5:25
2. "A Foggy Day" (Gershwin, Gershwin) - 6:46
3. "For All We Know" (Coots, Lewis) - 5:31
4. "Oh Well, Oh Well" - 3:45
5. "At Last" (Gordon, Warren) - 5:37
6. "Secret Love" (Sammy Fain, Paul Francis Webster) - 5:44
7. "Don't Go, Don't Go" - 5:08
8. "Saucer Eyes" (Weston) - 4:41

Bonus tracks on 1998 CD reissue:

9. "You Dig It" - 5:41
10. "Nature Boy" (eden ahbez) - 4:11
11. "Theme From M Squad" (Count Basie) - erroneously credited to (Carter) - 4:15
12. "Azule Serape" (Feldman) - 4:22
13. "For Dancers Only" (Oliver, Raye, Schoen) - 3:52
14. "Back Home" - 3:27
15. "Tadd's Delight" (Dameron) - 5:37

=== 2015 SHM-CD reissue ===
1. "Black Orchid" (Cal Tjader) - Erroneously credited to (Neil Hefti) - 5:24
2. "A Foggy Day" (Gershwin, Gershwin) - 6:44
3. "For All We Know" (Coots, Lewis) - 5:29
4. "Oh Well, Oh Well" - 3:43
5. "At Last" (Gordon, Warren) - 5:34
6. "Secret Love" (Fain) - 5:42
7. "Don't Go, Don't Go" - 5:05
8. "Saucer Eyes" (Weston) - 4:40

Bonus tracks

9. "Babe's Blues" (Randy Weston) - 4:37
10. "Over the Rainbow" (Harburg, Arlen) - 4:55
11. "Tadd's Delight" (Dameron) - 5:40
12. "Azule Serape" (Feldman) - 4:20
13. "For Dancers Only" (Oliver, Raye, Schoen) - 3:51
14. "Nature Boy" (Ahbez) - 4:09

== Personnel ==
- Gene Harris - piano
- Andrew Simpkins - bass
- Bill Dowdy - drums
