= The 3 Sounds =

American jazz piano trio

- Genres: Soul jazz Hard bop Post-bop
- Labels: Riverside; Blue Note; Verve; Mercury; Limelight
- Past members: Gene Harris; Andrew Simpkins; Bill Dowdy

The 3 Sounds (also known as The Three Sounds) was an American jazz piano trio that formed in 1956 and disbanded in 1973.

The band formed in Benton Harbor, Michigan, United States, as the Four Sounds. The original lineup consisted of Gene Harris on piano, Andrew Simpkins on double bass and Bill Dowdy on drums, along with saxophonist Lonnie "The Sound" Walker, who dropped out the following year. The group moved to Washington and then New York, where, as the Three Sounds, they cut a record for Riverside Records, before signing an exclusive contract with Blue Note.

Between 1958 and 1962, the group released nine albums for Blue Note. They toured nationally during this period, building a large following in jazz clubs across the country. The trio played and recorded with the likes of saxophonists Lester Young, Lou Donaldson, Stanley Turrentine and Sonny Stitt, cornet player Nat Adderley, singer Anita O'Day, and guitarist Bucky Pizzarelli, among others.

== Samples in hip hop ==
Part of the Three Sounds song "Put On Train", from the 1971 Gene Harris album The 3 Sounds, was the prominent background sample in the hip hop group Beastie Boys' song "What Comes Around" on their 1989 album Paul's Boutique.

== Discography ==
=== 1958 – 1962: Blue Note years ===
Year	Catalog number	Title	Date recorded	Notes
1959	BLP 1600	Introducing the 3 Sounds	1958-09-16, -18	
1959	BLP 4012	LD + 3	1959-02-18	with Lou Donaldson
1959	BLP 4014	Bottoms Up!	1958-09-16, -28, 1959-02-11	
1960	BLP 4020	Good Deal	1959-05-20	
1961	BLP 4044	Moods	1960	
1961	BLP 4057	Blue Hour	1960	with Stanley Turrentine
1961	BLP 4072	Feelin' Good	1960	
1962	BLP 4088	Here We Come	1960	
1962	BLP 4102	Hey There	1961	
1963	BLP 4120	It Just Got to Be	1960	
1964	BLP 4155	Black Orchid	1962	
1966	BLP 4197	Out of This World	1962	
1986	BST 84434	Babe's Blues	1961, 1962	
1998	N/A	Standards	1959, 1962	

=== 1962: Verve year ===
Year	Catalog number	Title	Date recorded	Notes
1963	V-8513	Blue Genes	1962	
1963	V-8514	Anita O'Day & the Three Sounds	1962	with Anita O'Day

=== 1962 – 1964: Mercury years ===
Year	Catalog number	Title	Date recorded	Notes
1963	MG 20776	The Three Sounds Play Jazz on Broadway	1962	
1963	MG 20839	Some Like It Modern	1963	
1964	MG 20921	Live at the Living Room	1964	live

=== 1965 – 1966: Limelight years ===
Year	Catalog number	Title	Date recorded	Notes
1965	LM 82014	Three Moods	1965	with arrangements by Julian Lee
1965	LM 82026	Beautiful Friendship	1965	with arrangements by Julian Lee
1966	LM 82037	Today's Sounds	1966-02	live; with Kalil Madi replacing Bill Dowdy on drums

=== 1967 – 1970: Return to Blue Note ===
Year	Catalog number	Title	Date recorded	Personnel/Notes
1967	BLP 4248	Vibrations	1966	Andy Simpkins (bass), Kalil Madi (drums)
1967	BLP 4265	Live at The Lighthouse	1967	Andy Simpkins (bass), Donald Bailey (drums); live
1968	BST 84285	Coldwater Flat	1968	Andy Simpkins (bass), Donald Bailey (drums); plus Oliver Nelson Orchestra
1968	BST 84301	Elegant Soul	1968	Andy Simpkins (bass), Carl Burnett (drums); plus orchestra
1969	BST 84341	Soul Symphony	1969	Henry Franklin (bass), Carl Burnett (drums); plus orchestra
1996	N/A	Live at the 'It Club'	1970	Henry Franklin (bass), Carl Burnett (drums); live
2000	N/A	Live at the 'It Club' Volume 2	1970	Henry Franklin (bass), Carl Burnett (drums); live (Source:)
