= Paul Humphrey (American musician) =

American jazz and R&B drummer (1935–2014)

- Born: Paul Nelson Humphrey; October 12, 1935; Detroit, U.S.
- Died: January 31, 2014 (aged 78)
- Genres: R&B, crossover jazz, jazz
- Occupation: Musician
- Instrument: Drums
- Years active: 1950s–2014

Paul Nelson Humphrey (October 12, 1935 – January 31, 2014) was an American jazz and R&B drummer.

== Biography ==
Humphrey was born in Detroit and began playing drums at age eight, taking private lessons in Detroit. In high school he played baritone horn, trombone and drums in the school band. Upon graduation he entered the U.S. Navy and studied under Kenneth J. Abendschein, touring the world and playing with many jazz figures of 1950s.

After discharge from the service, he worked as a session drummer in New York for Wes Montgomery, John Coltrane, Les McCann, Kai Winding, Jimmy Smith, Charles Mingus, Joe Williams, Lee Konitz, Blue Mitchell, Gene Ammons and the Harry James Band (replacing Buddy Rich). He moved to Los Angeles and joined the Harry "Sweets" Edison group with Tommy Flanagan and Frank Delarossa. He recorded with Larry Williams and Johnny "Guitar" Watson and toured and recorded with Marvin Gaye, The Four Tops, The Supremes, Tony Orlando, Jerry Garcia, Burt Bacharach, Diahann Carroll, Sammy Davis Jr. and Bill Medley. In late 1974, he toured with Jerry Garcia, Merl Saunders, Martin Fierro and John Kahn, succeeding Bill Kreutzmann and preceding Ron Tutt as drummer for the configuration later named Legion of Mary.

As a bandleader, he recorded under the name Paul Humphrey and the Cool Aid Chemists with keyboardist Clarence MacDonald, guitarist David T. Walker, and bassist Phil Upchurch. The album was produced by Gabriel Mekler and engineered by Dave Hassinger. In 1971 this band had two hits, "Cool Aid" (US No. 29, US R&B Singles No. 14) and "Funky L.A." (US No. 109, US R&B Singles No. 45).

Humphrey was one of the drummers on Marvin Gaye's album Let's Get It On. He also recorded with Steely Dan, Frank Zappa, Jimmy Smith, Al Kooper, Jackie DeShannon, Natalie Cole, Albert King, Quincy Jones, Dusty Springfield, Jean-Luc Ponty, Michael Franks, Maria Muldaur, Marc Bolan and many others.

Humphrey was the featured drummer for the Lawrence Welk orchestra and Welk television show from 1976 to 1982.

== Discography ==
=== As leader ===
- Supermellow (Blue Thumb, 1973)
- America, Wake Up (Blue Thumb, 1974)
- Paul Humphrey and the Cool-Aid Chemists (Lizard, 1971)
- Cochise (ABC, 1974)
- The Drum Session (Philips, 1975)
- The Drum Session Vol. 2 (Philips, 1977)
- Me and My Drums (Stanson, 1979)
- Paul Humphrey Sextet (Discovery, 1981)

=== As sideman ===
With Mel Brown

- Chicken Fat (Impulse!, 1967)
- The Wizard (Impulse!, 1968)
- Eighteen Pounds of Unclean Chitlins and Other Greasy Blues Specialities (ABC, 1973)

With Ron Eschete

- Mo' Strings Attached (Jazz Alliance, 1993)
- Rain or Shine (Concord, 1995)
- Soft Winds (Concord, 1996)

With Four Tops

- Keeper of the Castle (Dunhill, 1972)
- Main Street People (Dunhill, 1973)
- Meeting of the Minds (Dunhill, 1974)
- Back Where I Belong (Motown, 1983)

With Eddie Harris

- The Reason Why I'm Talking S--t (Atlantic, 1976)
- That Is Why You're Overweight (Atlantic, 1976)
- How Can You Live Like That? (Atlantic, 1977)

With Gene Harris

- The 3 Sounds (Blue Note, 1971)
- Nature's Way (Jam & Tapes, 1984)
- A Little Piece of Heaven (Concord, 1993)
- Funky Gene's (Concord, 1994)
- Brotherhood (Concord, 1995)
- It's the Real Soul (Concord, 1996)
- In His Hands (Concord, 1997)

With Richard "Groove" Holmes

- Welcome Home (World Pacific, 1968)
- Workin' On a Groovy Thing (World Pacific, 1969)
- X-77 (World Pacific, 1969)

With Quincy Jones

- Smackwater Jack (A&M, 1971)
- $ (Reprise, 1972)
- Body Heat (A&M, 1974)
- I Heard That!! (A&M, 1976)

With Charles Kynard

- Reelin' with the Feelin' (Prestige, 1969)
- Woga (Mainstream, 1972)
- Your Mama Don't Dance (Mainstream, 1973)

With Les McCann

- The Gospel Truth (Pacific, 1963)
- Soul Hits (Pacific, 1964)
- Spanish Onions (Pacific, 1964)
- McCanna (Pacific, 1964)
- McCann/Wilson (Pacific, 1964)
- But Not Really (Limelight, 1965)
- Beaux J. Pooboo (Limelight, 1965)
- A Bag of Gold (Pacific, 1966)
- Live at Shelly's Manne-Hole (Limelight, 1966)
- Live at Bohemian Caverns - Washington, DC (Limelight, 1967)
- Another Beginning (Atlantic, 1974)
- River High River Low (Atlantic, 1976)

With Blue Mitchell

- Bantu Village (Blue Note, 1969)
- Collision in Black (Blue Note, 1969)
- The Last Tango = Blues (Mainstream, 1973)
- Booty (Mainstream, 1974)

With Freddy Robinson

- The Coming Atlantis (World Pacific, 1969)
- Hot Fun in the Summertime (Liberty, 1970)
- At the Drive-in (Enterprise, 1972)

With T-Bone Walker

- Super Black Blues (BluesTime, 1969)
- Every Day I Have the Blues (Bluestime, 1969)
- Stormy Monday Blues (BluesWay, 1968)
- Dirty Mistreater (BluesWay, 1973)
- Very Rare (Reprise, 1973)

With Gerald Wilson

- Eternal Equinox (World Pacific, 1969)
- Lomelin (Discovery, 1981)
- Jessica (Trend, 1983)
- Calafia (Trend, 1985)

With others

- The 5th Dimension, Living Together, Growing Together (Bell, 1973)
- Arthur Adams, It's Private Tonight (Blue Thumb, 1973)
- Monty Alexander, Alexander the Great (Pacific, 1965)
- Monty Alexander, Spunky (Pacific, 1965)
- Gene Ammons, Free Again (Prestige, 1972)
- Blackalicious, Blazing Arrow (MCA, 2002)
- Bobby Bryant, The Jazz Excursion into Hair (World Pacific, 1969)
- Charles Brown, So Goes Love (Verve, 1998)
- Solomon Burke, Electronic Magnetism (MGM, 1971)
- Kenny Burrell, 'Round Midnight (Fantasy, 1972)
- David Byrne, Music for "The Knee Plays" (ECM, 1985)
- Terry Callier, Fire on Ice (Elektra, 1978)
- Merry Clayton, Gimme Shelter (Ode, 1970)
- Merry Clayton, Merry Clayton (Ode, 1971)
- Joe Cocker, With a Little Help from My Friends (A&M, 1969)
- Joe Cocker, Joe Cocker! (A&M, 1969)
- Natalie Cole, Thankful (Capitol, 1977)
- Al Jazzbo Collins, A Lovely Bunch of Al Jazzbo Collins and the Bandidos (Impulse!, 1967)
- Bill Cosby, Bill Cosby Presents Badfoot Brown and the Bunions Bradford Funeral Marching Band (Sussex, 1972)
- Jack Daugherty, The Class of Nineteen Hundred and Seventy One (A&M, 1971)
- Jackie DeShannon, Laurel Canyon (Imperial, 1969)
- Ron Elliott, The Candlestickmaker (Warner Bros., 1969)
- England Dan & John Ford Coley, Fables (A&M, 1972)
- José Feliciano, Just Wanna Rock 'n' Roll (RCA Victor, 1975)
- Michael Franks, Michael Franks (Brut, 1973)
- Jerry Garcia, Pure Jerry: Keystone Berkeley, September 1, 1974 (Jerry Made, 2004)
- Jerry Garcia, Garcia Live Volume 18 (ATO, 2022)
- Snuff Garrett, Classical Country (Ranwood, 1976)
- Marvin Gaye, Let's Get It On (Tamla, 1973)
- Niki Haris, Dreaming a Dream (BMG, 1997)
- Steve Harley, Hobo with a Grin (EMI, 1978)
- Richie Havens, Richard P. Havens, 1983 (Verve Forecast, 1968)
- Wings Hauser, Your Love Keeps Me Off the Streets (RCA, 1975)
- Dale Hawkins, L.A., Memphis & Tyler, Texas (Columbia, 1969)
- Edwin Hawkins, Children (Buddah, 1971)
- Monk Higgins, Dance to the Disco Sax of Monk Higgins (Buddah, 1974)
- Z. Z. Hill, Keep On Lovin' You (United Artists, 1975)
- Red Holloway, Live at the 1995 Floating Jazz Festival (Chiaroscuro, 1997)
- Red Holloway, Coast to Coast (Milestone, 2003)
- Craig Hundley, Craig Hundley Trio Plays with the Big Boys (World Pacific, 1969)
- Milt Jackson, Memphis Jackson (ABC, 1970)
- Milt Jackson, The Impulse Years (ABC, 1974)
- Etta James, Time After Time (RCA Victor, 1995)
- Plas Johnson, Evening Delight (Carell Music, 1999)
- Pete Jolly, Seasons (A&M, 1970)
- Gloria Jones, Windstorm (Capitol, 1978)
- Carol Kaye, Picking Up On the E-String (Groove Attack, 1995)
- Raymond Louis Kennedy, Raymond Louis Kennedy (Cream, 1970)
- Stan Kenton, Hair (Capitol, 1969)
- Sarah Kernochan, Beat Around the Bush (RCA, 1974)
- Albert King, Albert (Utopia, 1976)
- Clydie King, Direct Me (Lizard, 1970)
- Al Kooper, New York City (You're a Woman) (Columbia, 1971)
- Al Kooper, A Possible Projection of the Future / Childhood's End (Columbia, 1972)
- Hubert Laws, A Hero Ain't Nothin' but a Sandwich (Columbia, 1978)
- Mark LeVine, Pilgrim's Progress (Hogfat, 1968)
- Bob Lind, Since There Were Circles (Capitol, 1971)
- Gloria Lynne, Happy and in Love (Canyon, 1970)
- Marilyn McCoo & Billy Davis Jr., Marilyn & Billy (Columbia, 1978)
- Jimmy McCracklin, The Stinger Man (Minit, 1969)
- Carmen McRae, Fine and Mellow Live at Birdland West (Concord, 1988)
- Mike Melvoin, The Plastic Cow Goes Moooooog (Dot, 1969)
- Montgomery Brothers, The Montgomery Brothers in Canada (Vocalion, 1963)
- Wes Montgomery, Wes' Best (Fantasy, 1967)
- Barbara Morrison, Love Is a Four-Letter Word (Esoteric, 1984)
- Barbara Morrison, Visit Me (Chartmaker, 1999)
- Geoff Muldaur, Is Having a Wonderful Time (Reprise, 1975)
- Maria Muldaur, Waitress in a Donut Shop (Reprise, 1974)
- Joe Pass, Better Days (Gwyn, 1971)
- Brenda Patterson, Brenda Patterson (Playboy, 1973)
- Jean-Luc Ponty, Electric Connection (World Pacific, 1969)
- Dory Previn, Mythical Kings and Iguanas (United Artists, 1971)
- Dory Previn, Reflections in a Mud Puddle/Taps Tremors and Time Steps (United Artists, 1971)
- Herman Riley, Herman (Jam & Tapes, 1984)
- The Sandpipers, A Gift of Song (A&M, 1971)
- Merl Saunders, You Can Leave Your Hat On (Fantasy, 1976)
- Clifford Scott, Out Front! (Pacific, 1963)
- Bobby Short, Guess Who's in Town (Atlantic, 1987)
- Norman Simmons, In Private (Savant, 2004)
- Jimmy Smith, Root Down (Verve, 1972)
- Rockie Robbins, Rockie Robbins (A&M, 1979)
- Spike Robinson, Jusa Bit 'o' Blues Volume 1 (Capri, 1989)
- Evie Sands, Any Way That You Want Me (Rev-Ola, 1970)
- Soul Generation, Beyond Body and Soul (Ebony, 1972)
- Otis Spann, Sweet Giant of the Blues (BluesTime, 1970)
- Dusty Springfield, Cameo (ABC, 1973)
- Mary Stallings, I Waited for You (Concord, 1994)
- Mary Stallings, Spectrum (Concord, 1996)
- Steely Dan, Aja (ABC, 1977)
- Maxine Sullivan, At Vine St. Live (DRG, 1992)
- Sam Taylor, The Tunnel of My Mind (GRT, 1969)
- T. Rex, Dandy in the Underworld (EMI, 1977)
- Cal Tjader, Last Bolero in Berkeley (Fantasy, 1973)
- Big Joe Turner, Otis Spann and T-Bone Walker, Super Black Blues (BluesTime, 1969)
- Stanley Turrentine, Flipped Flipped Out (Canyon, 1970)
- Stanley Turrentine, Stanley Turrentine (UpFront, 1971)
- The Valentine Brothers, Valentine Brothers (MCA, 1979)
- David T. Walker, David T. Walker (Ode, 1973)
- David T. Walker, Joe Sample, Soul Food Cafe (Invitation, 1989)
- Johnny "Big Moose" Walker, Rambling Woman (BluesWay, 1970)
- Ernie Watts, The Wonder Bag (Vault, 1970)
- Tim Weisberg, Tim Weisberg (A&M, 1972)
- Maxine Weldon, Chilly Wind (Mainstream, 1971)
- Maxine Weldon, Right On (Mainstream, 1971)
- Lawrence Welk, Nadia's Theme (Ranwood, 1976)
- Gerald Wiggins, Soulidarity (Concord, 1996)
- Jimmy Witherspoon, Handbags and Gladrags (ABC, 1971)
- Jimmy Witherspoon, Rockin' L.A. (Fantasy, 1989)
- Frank Zappa, Hot Rats (Bizarre, 1969)
