= Spunky (album) =

Studio album by Monty Alexander
- Released: 1965
- Recorded: 1964–1965
- Studio: World Pacific, Los Angeles; Plaza Sound, New York
- Genre: hard bop
- Length: 33:10
- Label: Pacific Jazz
- Producer: Richard Bock

Monty Alexander chronology
Alexander the Great (1964)	Spunky (1965)	Zing! (1968)

Professional ratings
Review scores
Source	Rating
AllMusic	2.5/5 stars
Billboard	4/4 stars
Colin Larkin	4/5 stars

Spunky is a studio album released by Monty Alexander in 1965 on Pacific Jazz LP record ST-20094 (stereo) and PJ-10094 (mono).

== Track listing ==
No.	Title	Length
1.	"Spunky" (Monty Alexander)	2:39
2.	"Naturally" (Nat Adderley)	3:35
3.	"Jamaican Shake" (Monty Alexander)	2:25
4.	"Heartstrings" (Milt Jackson)	3:33
5.	"Taggie's Tune" (Junior Mance)	4:14
6.	"Rattlesnake" (Monty Alexander)	2:30
7.	"Whisper Not" (Benny Golson)	3:58
8.	"I'm an Old Cowhand" (Johnny Mercer)	2:32
9.	"Little Children of Peru" (Scott Turner)	2:50
10.	"Spirit of Foo Foo" (Monty Alexander)	4:45
Total length:		33:10

== Personnel ==
- Monty Alexander: piano (all tracks)
- Victor Gaskin: bass (all but 4, 6)
- Paul Humphrey: drums (all but 4, 6)
- Bob Cranshaw: bass (tracks 4, 6)
- Bruno Carr: drums (tracks 4, 6)
- Gene Bertoncini: guitar (tracks 4, 6)
- Scott Turner: guitar (track 9)
