= Beaux J. Pooboo =

Studio album by Les McCann Ltd.
- Released: 1965
- Recorded: July–August 1965; Los Angeles, CA
- Genre: Jazz
- Length: 40:30
- Label: Limelight; LM 82025/LS 86025
- Producer: Luchi de Jesus and Hal Mooney

Les McCann chronology
But Not Really (1965)	Beaux J. Pooboo (1965)	Live at Shelly's Manne-Hole (1966)

Beaux J. Pooboo is an album by pianist Les McCann recorded in 1965 and released on the Limelight label.

== Reception ==
Professional ratings
Review scores
Source	Rating
Allmusic	3/5 stars

Allmusic gives the album 3 stars stating "Les McCann's second album for Limelight is loaded with his mid-60s trademarks – the deep-down gospel rhythmic feeling and amen responses, the insistent McCann piano tremolos and wide-screen chording, a leisurely excursion into the blues ("Les McNasty"), and party time all around".

== Track listing ==
All compositions by Les McCann except as indicated

1. "The Grabber" (Monty Alexander) – 3:45
2. "Les McNasty" – 6:07
3. "Green Green Rocky Road" – 2:44
4. "Send Me Love" – 4:19
5. "This Could Be the Start of Something" (Steve Allen) – 3:10
6. "The Great City" (Curtis Lewis) – 3:30
7. "Beaux J. Pooboo" – 5:11
8. "Bat Man" – 4:47
9. "Roll 'Em Pete" (Big Joe Turner, Pete Johnson) – 4:32
10. "Old Folks" (Dedette Lee Hill, Willard Robison) – 2:25

== Personnel ==
- Les McCann – piano, vocals
- Vince Corrao – guitar
- Victor Gaskin – bass
- Paul Humphrey – drums
