= Collision in Black =

Studio album by Blue Mitchell
- Released: Early April 1969
- Recorded: September 9, 11–12, 1968
- Studio: RPM Studios, Los Angeles
- Genre: Jazz
- Length: 37:06
- Label: Blue Note; BST 84300
- Producer: Monk Higgins, Dee Ervin

Blue Mitchell chronology
Heads Up! (1967)	Collision in Black (1969)	Bantu Village (1969)

Collision in Black is an album by American trumpeter Blue Mitchell which features compositions and arrangements by Monk Higgins recorded in 1968 and released on the Blue Note label in 1969.

== Reception ==
Billboard felt the album should sell well.

Professional ratings
Review scores
Source	Rating
Allmusic	4/5 stars

The Allmusic review awarded the album 4 stars.

== Track listing ==
All compositions by Monk Higgins except as indicated

1. "Collision in Black" - 3:02
2. "Deeper in Black" (Peggy Grayson) - 3:26
3. "Jo Ju Ja" (Virginia P. Bland) - 3:18
4. "Blue on Black" - 2:55
5. "Swahilli Suite" - 2:58
6. "Monkin' Around" - 3:38
7. "Keep Your Nose Clean" (Bland) - 3:25
8. "I Ain't Jivin'" (Bland) - 2:45
9. "Digging in the Dirt" - 3:27
10. "Who Dun It?" - 2:56
11. "Kick It" (Bland) - 2:28
12. "Keep Your Soul Together" - 2:48

== Personnel ==
- Blue Mitchell - trumpet
- Monk Higgins - tenor saxophone, piano, organ, arrangement
- Jim Horn, Ernie Watts - flute
- Anthony Ortega - tenor saxophone
- Dick "Slyde" Hyde, Jack Redmond - trombone
- Al Vescovo - guitar
- Miles Grayson - piano, percussion
- Dee Ervin - organ, percussion
- Bob West - electric bass
- Paul Humphrey - drums
- John Cyr - percussion
