= The Original Jam Sessions 1969 =

Studio album by Quincy Jones & Bill Cosby
- Released: June 22, 2004
- Recorded: July–September, 1969
- Studio: Warner Brothers/Seven Arts, Burbank, California
- Genre: Jazz
- Length: 52:43
- Label: Concord
- Producer: Quincy Jones

Quincy Jones & Bill Cosby chronology
Basie and Beyond (2000)	The Original Jam Sessions 1969 (2004)	Q: Soul Bossa Nostra (2010)

Professional ratings
Review scores
Source	Rating
Allmusic	4/5 stars

The Original Jam Sessions 1969 is an album by Quincy Jones and Bill Cosby that was released in 2004. The album was recorded as backing music for The Bill Cosby Show in 1969.

== Track listing ==
#	Title	Guest(s)	Time
1	"Hikky-Burr (Kincaid Kinfolk)"		5:58
2	"Groovy Gravy"		8:14
3	"Oh Happy Day"	Edwin Hawkins	4:20
4	"Jimmy Cookin' On Top (Interlude)"		1:42
5	"Toe Jam"		7:49
6	"Jive Den"		3:13
7	"Eubie Walkin'"		7:00
8	"Monty, Is That You"	Monty Alexander	6:44
9	"The Drawing Room (Interlude)"		0:54
10	"Hikky-Burr"	Cosby	3:47

=== Hidden tracks ===
#	Title	Time
11	"Hikky-Burr"	3:01

== Personnel ==
- Quincy Jones – Composer, musical director
- Bill Cosby – Vocals
- Arthur Adams – Guitar
- Eddie Harris – Tenor saxophone
- Ernie Watts – Tenor saxophone
- Clare Fischer – Piano
- Les McCann – Piano
- Monty Alexander – Piano
- Joe Sample – Fender Rhodes piano
- Jimmy Smith – Hammond B-3 organ
- Milt Jackson – Vibraphone
- Victor Feldman – Vibraphone
- Ray Brown – Bass
- Carol Kaye – Electric bass
- John Guerin – Drums
- Paul Humphrey – Drums
- Jimmy Cleveland – Trombone
- Marvin Stamm – Trumpet
