= Bantu Village =

Studio album by Blue Mitchell
- Released: September 16, 1969
- Recorded: May 22–23, 1969
- Genre: Jazz
- Label: Blue Note

Blue Mitchell chronology
Collision in Black (1968)	Bantu Village (1969)	Blue Mitchell (1971)

Bantu Village is an album by American trumpeter Blue Mitchell which features arrangements by Monk Higgins recorded and released on the Blue Note label in 1969.

== Reception ==
Professional ratings
Review scores
Source	Rating
Allmusic	4/5 stars

The Allmusic review awarded the album 4 stars.

== Track listing ==
All compositions by Dee Ervin and Monk Higgins except as indicated

1. "H.N.I.C." (Blue Mitchell, Dee Ervin, Monk Higgins) - 5:18
2. "Flat Backing" - 4:18
3. "Na Ta Ka" (Fred Robinson) - 3:56
4. "Heads Down" - 5:19
5. "Bantu Village" - 3:46
6. "Blue Dashiki" (Robinson) - 4:51
7. "Bush Girl" (Virginia P. Bland, Dee Ervin) - 3:03
- Recorded at RPM Studios, Los Angeles, California on May 22 (tracks 2, 4 & 6) and May 23 (tracks 1, 3, 5 & 7), 1969.

== Personnel ==
- Blue Mitchell, Bobby Bryant - trumpet
- Monk Higgins - piano, percussion, conducting, arrangement
- Buddy Collette - flute
- Bill Green - flute, alto saxophone
- Plas Johnson - tenor saxophone
- Charlie Loper - trombone
- Freddy Robinson, Al Vescovo - guitar
- Dee Ervin - piano, percussion
- Bob West (tracks 2, 4 & 6) - bass
- Wilton Felder (tracks 1, 3, 5 & 7) - electric bass
- John Guerin (tracks 2, 4 & 6), Paul Humphrey (tracks 1, 3, 5 & 7) - drums
- King Errisson (tracks 1, 3, 5 & 7), Alan Estes (tracks 2, 4 & 6) - conga
