= On Stage (Gerald Wilson album) =

Studio album by Gerald Wilson Orchestra
- Released: 1965
- Recorded: January 13 and March 10, 1965
- Studio: Capitol (Hollywood); Pacific Jazz (Los Angeles)
- Genre: Jazz
- Label: Pacific Jazz; PJ 88
- Producer: Richard Bock

Gerald Wilson chronology
McCann/Wilson (1964)	On Stage (1965)	Feelin' Kinda Blues (1965)

On Stage is an album by the Gerald Wilson Orchestra recorded in 1965 and released on the Pacific Jazz label.

== Reception ==
Professional ratings
Review scores
Source	Rating
AllMusic	4/5 stars

AllMusic rated the album with 4 stars; in his review, Scott Yanow said: "Arranger Gerald Wilson led one of the finest big bands of the 1960s. This out of print LP features the L.A. orchestra in top form although, since it is a studio album, its title is inaccurate".

== Track listing ==
All compositions by Gerald Wilson except as indicated

1. "Los Moros de Espana" - 3:05
2. "Who Can I Turn To?" (Leslie Bricusse, Anthony Newley) - 2:50
3. "Ricardo" - 4:30
4. "Musette" - 2:34
5. "In the Limelight" - 5:47
6. "Lighthouse Blues" - 7:25
7. "El Viti" - 3:50
8. "Lately" (Lester Robertson) - 3:42
9. "Perdido" (Juan Tizol) - 4:26
- Recorded at Capitol Studios on January 13, 1965 (tracks 1, 4, 6 & 9) and Pacific Jazz Studios on March 10, 1965 (tracks 2, 3, 5, 7 & 8) in Hollywood, CA. The album is also known as In The Limelight

== Personnel ==
- Gerald Wilson - arranger, conductor, trumpet
- Bobby Bryant (tracks 2, 3, 5, 7 & 8), Jules Chaikin, Freddie Hill, Nat Meeks, Melvin Moore, Al Porcino (tracks 1, 4, 6 & 9) - trumpet
- Bob Edmondson, John Ewing, Lester Robertson - trombone
- Don Switzer (tracks 1, 4, 6 & 9), Ernie Tack (tracks 2, 3, 5, 7 & 8) - bass trombone
- Bud Shank - alto saxophone, flute (tracks 1, 4, 6 & 9)
- Anthony Ortega - alto saxophone
- Curtis Amy (tracks 1, 4, 6 & 9), Teddy Edwards, Harold Land - tenor saxophone
- Jack Nimitz - baritone saxophone
- Roy Ayers - vibraphone
- Phil Moore III - piano
- Jack Wilson - piano, organ (tracks 2, 3, 5, 7 & 8)
- Joe Pass - guitar
- Victor Gaskin (tracks 2, 3, 5, 7 & 8), Herbie Lewis (tracks 1, 4, 6 & 9) - bass
- Chuck Carter - drums
