= Fifty Foot Hose =

American underground rock band

- Origin: San Francisco, California, United States
- Genre: Psychedelic rock
- Years active: 1967–1970, 1995–present
- Labels: Limelight, Mercury, Big Beat, Weasel Disc

Fifty Foot Hose is an American psychedelic rock band that formed in San Francisco in the late 1960s, and reformed in the 1990s. They were one of the first bands to fuse rock and experimental music. Like a few other acts of the time (most notably The United States of America), they consciously tried to combine the contemporary sounds of rock with electronic instruments and avant-garde compositional ideas.

== 1960s – original group ==
The original group comprised three core members: founder and bassist Louis "Cork" Marcheschi, guitarist David Blossom, and vocalist Nancy Blossom, augmented by Kim Kimsey (drums) and Larry Evans (guitar).

Cork Marcheschi (born 1945) grew up in Burlingame, California. In his teens, he performed with the Ethix, who played R&B music in clubs around San Francisco and in Las Vegas, and released one experimental and wildly atonal single, "Bad Trip", in 1967, with the intention that the record could be played at any speed. Interested in the ideas of experimental composers like Edgard Varèse, John Cage, Terry Riley, and George Antheil, he constructed his own custom-made electronic instrument from a combination of elements like theremins, fuzzboxes, a cardboard tube, and a speaker from a World War II bomber.

David and Nancy Blossom brought both psychedelic and jazz influences to the band. Together, the trio recorded a demo which led to a deal with Limelight Records, a subsidiary of Mercury Records. They released one album, Cauldron, in December 1967. It contained eleven songs, including "Fantasy", "Red the Sign Post" and "God Bless the Child", a cover of a Billie Holiday number. It was an intriguing mix of jazzy psychedelic rock tunes with fierce and advanced electronic sound effects. "I don't know if they are immature or premature", said critic Ralph J. Gleason.

The record sold few copies at the time, although the group had a small but intense following in San Francisco and also toured with other acts including Blue Cheer, Chuck Berry and Fairport Convention, when the band was augmented by Robert Goldbeck (bass). They broke up in late 1969, when most of its members joined the musical Hair, Nancy Blossom becoming the lead in the San Francisco production and later singing in Godspell. Larry Evans returned to his hometown of Muncie, Indiana, where he fronted several club groups until his death in 2008.

== 1990s – reformation ==
Interest in Fifty Foot Hose resurfaced in the 1990s, as they became recognized as precursors to the electronic rock sounds of groups like Pere Ubu, Chrome and Throbbing Gristle, and Cauldron was reissued on CD. By this time, Marcheschi had become a respected sculptor, specializing in public work using neon, plastic, and kinetic characteristics.

In 1995, Marcheschi reformed the group for live performances in San Francisco, with a new set of musicians. These performances led to the release of the album Live & Unreleased, which was followed in 1997 by a new studio album, Sing Like Scaffold. On the latter album, Fifty Foot Hose essentially comprised Marcheschi (on echolette, twin audio generators, squeaky stick, white noise generator, theremin, spark gap, and saw blades), Walter Funk III (jokers Ulysses and Cupid constructed by Fred 'Spaceman' Long, Bug (Tom Nunn), vocoder, Hologlyphic Funkaliser, and other electronix), Reid Johnston (guitube, guitar, tools, horns, harmonium, hardware, bikewheel), Lenny Bove (bass, electronics, vocals), Elizabeth Perry (vocals), and Dean Cook (drums).

Funk and Johnston subsequently formed the avant-garde electronic band Kwisp, the first of whose two albums also featured Marcheschi.

In 2006, Marcheschi, Funk, Johnston, and Konstantine Baranov (producer of Sing Like Scaffold), known as CWRK Musical Environments, installed a public sound installation in an atrium in Hong Kong.

== Discography ==
- Cauldron (1968, Limelight Records)
- ...Live... And Unreleased (1997, Captain Trip Records)
- Ingredients (1997, Del Val)
- Sing Like Scaffold (1998, Weasel Disc Records)
