= Live from Los Angeles =

Live album by Oliver Nelson
- Released: 1967
- Recorded: June 2–4, 1967
- Venue: Marty's on the Hill, Los Angeles, CA
- Genre: Jazz
- Length: 38:37
- Label: Impulse! A 9153
- Producer: Bob Thiele

Oliver Nelson chronology
The Kennedy Dream (1967)	Live from Los Angeles (1967)	Jazzhattan Suite (1967)

Live from Los Angeles is an album by American jazz composer/arranger Oliver Nelson featuring performances recorded in 1967 for the Impulse! label.

== Reception ==
Professional ratings
Review scores
Source	Rating
Allmusic	2/5 stars
The Penguin Guide to Jazz Recordings	2.5/4 stars

The initial Billboard magazine review from February 1968 wrote that:

"Here's a driving high flying record from start to finish. It's jazz at its exciting best as Nelson's arranging conducting and zippy sax work lead real quality playing...".

The Allmusic review by Douglas Payne awarded the album 2 stars stating:

"Oliver Nelson's live recordings don't seem as sharp as his studio stuff. Good playing, though, from a good group of West Coasters, but nothing exciting happens".

== Track listing ==
All compositions by Oliver Nelson except as indicated

1. "Miss Fine" – 4:13
2. "Milestones" (Miles Davis) – 8:32
3. "I Remember Bird" (Leonard Feather) – 5:40
4. "Night Train" (Jimmy Forrest, Lewis P. Simpkins, Oscar Washington) – 4:49
5. "Guitar Blues" – 4:21
6. "Down by the Riverside" – 8:49
7. "Ja-Da" (Bob Carleton) – 2:13

- Recorded at Marty's On The Hill in Los Angeles, California on June 2, 1967 (track 1), June 3, 1967 (track 2) and June 4, 1967 (tracks 3–7).

== Personnel ==
- Oliver Nelson – soprano saxophone, arranger, conductor
- Buddy Childers, Bobby Bryant, Freddy Hill, Conte Candoli – trumpet
- Billy Byers, Pete Myers, Lou Blackburn, Ernie Tack – trombone
- Frank Strozier, Gabe Baltazar – alto saxophone
- Tom Scott, Bill Perkins – tenor saxophone
- Jack Nimitz – baritone saxophone
- Frank Strazzeri – piano
- Mel Brown – guitar (tracks 4 & 5)
- Monty Budwig – bass
- Ed Thigpen – drums
