= With Respect to Nat =

Studio album by Oscar Peterson
- Released: 1965
- Recorded: October 28 – November 13, 1965
- Genre: Vocal jazz, Jazz
- Length: 33:10
- Label: Mercury, Limelight, Verve (reissue)
- Producer: Jack Tracy

Oscar Peterson chronology
Eloquence (1965)	With Respect to Nat (1965)	Put On a Happy Face (1966)

With Respect to Nat - Oscar Peterson Sings and Plays Nat King Cole is a 1965 studio album by jazz pianist Oscar Peterson, recorded in tribute to Nat King Cole, who had died earlier that year. Peterson sings on all tracks except "Easy Listening Blues".

With Respect to Nat is the second album to feature Peterson singing, following Romance: The Vocal Styling Of Oscar Peterson, from 1954. A third, The Personal Touch was released in 1980.

== Reception ==
Professional ratings
Review scores
Source	Rating
AllMusic	4.5/5 stars
The Penguin Guide to Jazz Recordings	3/4 stars
The Rolling Stone Jazz Record Guide	2/5 stars

For AllMusic, critic Scott Yanow wrote, "Peterson, who rarely ever sang, is very effective on the well-rounded program, whether being backed by a big band (arranged by Manny Albam) on half of the selections or re-creating both the spirit of the Nat King Cole Trio and his own group of the late '50s during a reunion with guitarist Herb Ellis and bassist Ray Brown."

== Track listing ==
1. "When My Sugar Walks Down the Street" (Gene Austin, Jimmy McHugh, Irving Mills) – 2:18
2. "It's Only a Paper Moon" (Harold Arlen, Yip Harburg, Billy Rose) – 2:29
3. "Walkin' My Baby Back Home" (Fred E. Ahlert, Roy Turk) – 2:31
4. "Sweet Lorraine" (Cliff Burwell, Mitchell Parish) – 3:31
5. "Unforgettable" (Irving Gordon) – 2:37
6. "Little Girl" (Francis Henry, Matt Hyde) – 2:35
7. "Gee, Baby, Ain't I Good to You" (Andy Razaf, Don Redman) – 2:56
8. "Orange Colored Sky" (Milton DeLugg, William Stein) – 2:12
9. "Straighten Up and Fly Right" (Nat King Cole, Irving Mills) – 2:25
10. "Calypso Blues" (Clifford Carmen, Cole, Don George) – 3:34
11. "What Can I Say After I Say I'm Sorry?" (Walter Donaldson, Abe Lyman) – 2:39
12. "Easy Listening Blues" (Nadine Robinson) – 3:23

== Personnel ==
- Oscar Peterson — piano, vocals
- Hank Jones — piano
- Ray Brown, Richard Davis — double bass
- Herb Ellis, Barry Galbraith — guitar
- Mel Lewis — drums
- Wayne Andre, Jimmy Cleveland, J. J. Johnson — trombone
- Tony Studd — bass trombone
- Seldon Powell — alto flute, tenor saxophone
- Jerome Richardson — bass flute, tenor saxophone
- John Frosk, Joe Newman — trumpet
- Ernie Royal, Danny Stiles — trumpet, flugelhorn
- Phil Woods — alto saxophone
- Manny Albam — arranger, conductor
