= Alexander the Great (Monty Alexander album) =

Live album by Monty Alexander
- Released: 1965
- Recorded: 1964; The Esquire Theater, Los Angeles, CA
- Genre: Jazz
- Labels: Pacific Jazz; PJ 86
- Producer: Richard Bock

Monty Alexander chronology
Alexander the Great (1965)	Spunky (1965)

Alexander the Great is an album by pianist Monty Alexander (born 1944) recorded in 1964 for the Pacific Jazz label.

== Reception ==
Professional ratings
Review scores
Source	Rating
AllMusic	4/5 stars

AllMusic rated the album with 4 stars and reviewer Scott Yanow noted: "Even at that early stage (age 20), Alexander had very impressive technique and his Oscar Peterson-influenced style was starting to become distinctive".

== Track listing ==
1. "John Brown's Body" (Traditional) - 5:30
2. "Jitterbug Waltz" (Fats Waller) - 3:59
3. "Comin' Home Baby" (Ben Tucker) - 5:45
4. "If I Were a Bell" (Frank Loesser) - 6:18
5. "The Grabber" (Monty Alexander) - 5:30
6. "Autumn Leaves" (Joseph Kosma, Johnny Mercer) - 5:59
7. "I've Never Been in Love Before" (Loesser) - 5:30
8. "Blues for Jilly" (Alexander) - 4:40

== Personnel ==
- Monty Alexander - piano
- Victor Gaskin - bass
- Paul Humphrey - drums
