= Spanish Onions =

Live album by Les McCann
- Released: 1966
- Recorded: 1964; Esquire Theatre, Los Angeles, CA
- Genre: Jazz
- Length: 39:44
- Label: Pacific Jazz; PJ 10097
- Producer: Richard Bock

Les McCann chronology
Jazz Waltz (1963)	Spanish Onions (1966)	A Bag of Gold (1960-64)

Spanish Onions is an album by pianist Les McCann recorded in 1964 at a concert at the Esquire Theater in Los Angeles, CA., and released on the Pacific Jazz label in 1966.

== Reception ==
Professional ratings
Review scores
Source	Rating
Allmusic	4/5 stars

Allmusic gives the album 4 stars.

== Track listing ==
All compositions by Les McCann except as indicated

1. "El Soulo" - 3:16
2. "Lavande" - 6:40
3. "Spanish Onions" - 8:50
4. "Get Them Grits" - 4:30
5. "I Am in Love" (Cole Porter) - 5:30
6. "Arabella" - 5:43
7. "Maxie's Farewell" - 5:15

== Personnel ==
- Les McCann - piano
- Victor Gaskin - bass
- Paul Humphrey - drums
