= Extra Soul Perception =

Studio album by Monk Higgins
- Released: 1969
- Recorded: 1968 – early 1969
- Genre: Jazz
- Labels: Solid State; SS 18046
- Producers: Monk Higgins, Dee Ervin

Monk Higgins chronology
MacArthur Park (1967/1968)	Extra Soul Perception (1969)	Little Mama (1972)

Extra Soul Perception is an album by American saxophonist Monk Higgins recorded in 1968 and released on the Solid State label.

Professional ratings
Review scores
Source	Rating
Allmusic	3.5/5 stars

== Track listing ==
All compositions by Monk Higgins except where noted

1. "Extra Soul Perception" – 2:35
2. "The Look of Slim" – 3:00
3. "A Good Thing" (Dee Ervin) – 2:30
4. "Watermelon Man" (Herbie Hancock) – 3:10
5. "Straight Ahead" (Vee Pea) – 2:40
6. "Canadian Sunset" (Eddie Heywood, Norman Gimbel) – 3:56
7. "Collision in Black" – 4:00
8. "Just Around the Corner" (Pea) – 2:58
9. "Little Green Apples" (Bobby Russell) – 2:25
10. "Poker Chips" (Pea) – 3:08
11. "Sittin' Duck" – 3:00
12. "Doing It to Deff" – 2:50

== Personnel ==
- Monk Higgins – tenor saxophone, organ, arranger
- Bill Peterson – trumpet, flugelhorn
- Thomas Scott – trumpet
- David Duke – French horn
- Jim Horn – flute
- Miles Grayson – piano, percussion
- Arthur Adams, Freddy Robinson, Albert Vescovo – guitar
- Bob West, Ron Brown – electric bass
- John Guerin – drums
- Dee Ervin – percussion, organ
- Alan Estes – vibraphone, percussion
- Jerry Williams – congas
- Strings directed by Sidney Sharp

== Legacy ==
"Little Green Apples" was sampled in Gang Starr's "Code of the Streets", Gang Starr included Keith Elam and Christopher Edward Martin
