= I Am in Love =

1953 song written by Cole Porter

"I Am in Love" is a 1953 popular song written by Cole Porter, for his musical Can-Can, where it was introduced by Peter Cookson.

== Notable recordings ==
- Nat King Cole - His 1953 single release reached No. 19 in the Billboard chart. Cole re-recorded the song in stereo and it was included on his album The Nat King Cole Story (1961).
- Ella Fitzgerald - Ella Fitzgerald Sings the Cole Porter Songbook (1956)
- Eddie Fisher - As Long as There's Music (1958).
- Shelly Manne and His Men - At the Black Hawk 3 (1959)
- Peggy Lee - Latin ala Lee! (1960)
- Johnny Mathis - The Rhythms and Ballads of Broadway (1960)
- Vic Damone - On the Street Where You Live (1964).
- Les McCann - recorded a version for his live 1966 album Spanish Onions.
