= Soulful Brass =

Studio album by Oliver Nelson and Steve Allen
- Released: 1968
- Recorded: March 15 & 18, 1968
- Genre: Jazz
- Length: 36:11
- Label: Impulse!
- Producer: Bob Thiele

Oliver Nelson chronology
Jazzhattan Suite (1967)	Soulful Brass (1968)	Coldwater Flat (1968)

Soulful Brass is an album by American jazz composer/arranger Oliver Nelson and pianist/entertainer Steve Allen featuring performances recorded in 1968 for the Impulse! label.

== Reception ==
The Allmusic review by Douglas Payne awarded the album 1½ stars, stating: "Not one of Nelson's most memorable: watered-down arrangements and pop tunes framing Allen's electronic harpsichord noodling".

Professional ratings
Review scores
Source	Rating
Allmusic	1.5/5 stars

== Track listing ==
All compositions by Steve Allen except as indicated

1. "Torino" (Lou Garisto) - 2:03
2. "Sound Machine" (Steve Allen, S. Clayton) - 3:40
3. "Goin' Out of My Head / Can't Take My Eyes off You" (Teddy Randazzo, Bobby Weinstein / Bob Crewe, Bob Gaudio) - 2:50
4. "Spooky" (Mike Sharpe, Harry Middlebrook) - 3:43
5. "125th Street & 7th Avenue" (Oliver Nelson) - 3:55
6. "Green Tambourine" (Paul Leka, Shelly Pinz) - 2:28
7. "(Sittin' On) The Dock of the Bay" (Otis Redding, Steve Cropper) - 2:32
8. "Goin' Great" (Stan Applebaum) - 3:11
9. "Things I Should Have Said" (Steve Allen, David Allen) - 2:46
10. "Go Fly A Kite" - 2:30
11. "Melissa" - 3:59
12. "Last Night (Was a Bad Night)" - 2:34

- Recorded in Los Angeles, California, on March 15, 1968 (tracks 1, 4, 6, 8, 9, 11 & 12), and March 18, 1968 (tracks 2, 3, 5, 7 & 10)

== Personnel ==
- Steve Allen - electric harpsichord, piano
- Oliver Nelson - arranger, conductor
- Bobby Bryant - trumpet
- Tom Scott - tenor saxophone
- Roger Kellaway - piano
- Barney Kessel - guitar
- Larry Bunker, Jimmy Gordon - drums

Ron Carter - bass Britt Woodman - trombone Grady Tate - drums

- Other unknown musicians
