= Jim Horn =

American saxophonist (born 1940)

- Born: James Ronald Horn; November 20, 1940 (age 85); Los Angeles, California, U.S.
- Occupations: Musician; saxophonist
- Instruments: Saxophone; flute; piccolo; oboe; cor anglais; clarinet; bassoon; recorder
- Formerly of: The Wrecking Crew
- Website: jimhornmusic.com

James Ronald Horn (born November 20, 1940) is an American saxophonist, woodwind player, and session musician.

== Biography ==
Horn was born in Los Angeles, and after replacing saxophonist Steve Douglas in 1959, he toured with member Duane Eddy for five years, playing sax and flute on the road, and in the recording studio. Along with Bobby Keys and Jim Price he became one of the most in-demand horn session players of the 1970s and 1980s.

Horn played on solo albums by three members of the Beatles, forming a long association with George Harrison after appearing at the latter's Concert for Bangladesh benefit in 1971. Horn toured with John Denver on and off from 1978 to 1993. He also played with Denver in concert occasionally after the Wildlife Concert in 1995.

He played flute on the original studio recording of "Going Up the Country" by Canned Heat, reproduced in the film Woodstock. Horn played flute and saxophone on the Beach Boys' album Pet Sounds, and played flute on the Rolling Stones' album Goats Head Soup. Horn also collaborated with Don Williams on at least two songs and toured with Williams for two years.

In 2007, Horn was inducted into the Musicians Hall of Fame and Museum in Nashville as a member of the Wrecking Crew.

In 1961 Jim's sister, Kathie, married Mike Deasy, a noted session guitarist who also did much work with the Wrecking Crew.

== Artists with whom Horn has collaborated ==
- The 5th Dimension – "Up, Up and Away", "Aquarius/Let the Sunshine In"
- Aaron Neville
- Alan James – "Sweet Baby You", "Where It's At" on album Break The Ice (1991)
- Badfinger - Badfinger
- Barbra Streisand
- The Beach Boys – Pet Sounds – "Good Vibrations"
- Billy Joel
- Boz Scaggs – Memphis
- Buffalo Springfield – "Broken Arrow" (clarinet)
- Burton Cummings – "My Own Way to Rock" (Saxophone)
- Canned Heat – "Going Up the Country" (flute)
- Captain & Tennille – Song of Joy – "1954 Boogie Blues"
- The Carpenters – Carpenters
- Chi Coltrane
- Christopher Cross – "Ride Like the Wind"
- David Gates
- Deborah Allen
- Delaney & Bonnie
- Delbert McClinton – Never Been Rocked Enough
- Diana Ross
- Dizzy Gillespie – Free Ride
- Duane Eddy
- Elton John – "Little Jeannie" (alto)
- Elvis Presley – "Roustabout" (film)
- Frank Sinatra – "Strangers in the Night" (flute)
- Garth Brooks – "One Night a Day"
- George Benson – "Turn Your Love Around"
- George Harrison – 1971 The Concert for Bangladesh – 1974 Dark Horse Tour – "Cloud Nine" – "Got My Mind Set On You"– 1975 Extra Texture – "You".
- Glen Campbell -- "Wichita Lineman" (flute)
- Glenn Frey – "The One You Love" (ending tenor saxophone solo)
- Hank Williams, Jr. – "Monday Night Football Theme" – BORN TO BOOGIE
- Harry Chapin
- Harry Nilsson – Pussy Cats
- Herbie Hancock – "Man-Child"
- Harpo (Swedish singer)
- Ike and Tina Turner - "River Deep – Mountain High" (baritone)
- Jeff Lynne – Armchair Theatre
- Jim Salestrom
- John Denver
- Johnny Rivers – "Poor Side of Town"
- Joni Mitchell
- Jose Feliciano – "Light My Fire" and LP Feliciano!
- Joy of Cooking – Castles
- Kenny Chesney – As of July 2009, Horn is on tour with Kenny Chesney's Sun Carnival Tour. Horn has composed and arranged the horn sections for Chesney for the past several years.
- Leon Russell – "Lady Blue"
- Linda Ronstadt
- Lionel Richie
- Little Richard
- The Mamas & the Papas – notably "Creeque Alley"
- Michael Jackson
- Mink DeVille – Sportin' Life
- Molly Hatchet - The Deed Is Done
- Monk Higgins - Extra Soul Perception
- Neil Sedaka – Sedaka's Back
- Paul McCartney
- Pete Huttlinger
- Ringo Starr – "Don't Go Where the Road Don't Go"
- Rita Coolidge
- Ronnie Milsap – Lost in the Fifties Tonight
- Roy Orbison
- Seals & Crofts – Summer Breeze
- Shawn Phillips – "Italian Phases" (soprano saxophone)
- Shooter Jennings – Played and arranged horns on album "The Wolf" (2007)
- Spiral Starecase – "More Today Than Yesterday" (baritone)
- Steely Dan – The Royal Scam
- Steve Cropper and Booker T. & the M.G.'s – MEMPHIS (with Kioshiro) – 1992 Tour
- Steve Taylor – "I Blew Up the Clinic Real Good"
- Stevie Wonder "Ebony Eyes"
- The Righteous Brothers – "You've Lost That Lovin' Feelin'" (baritone)
- The Rolling Stones – Goat's Head Soup
- Todd Rundgren - Something/Anything?
- Tom Petty
- Toto – "Rosanna", "Africa"
- Traveling Wilburys – Volume 1, Volume 3
- Van Dyke Parks – Song Cycle
- Vince Gill – "I Can't Tell You Why"
- Warren Zevon – Excitable Boy (tenor)
- Wynonna

== Studio albums ==
- Through the Eyes of a Horn (1972) Shelter Records
- Jim's Horns (1973) Shelter Records
- Neon Nights (1989) Warner Bros Records
- Work It Out (1990)
- Children of the Universe (2012) self-released, CD Baby
