= McCann/Wilson =

Studio album by Les McCann with the Gerald Wilson Orchestra
- Released: 1965
- Recorded: 1964; Pacific Jazz Studios, Los Angeles, CA
- Genre: Jazz
- Length: 30:50
- Labels: Pacific Jazz; PJ 91
- Producer: Richard Bock

Les McCann chronology
McCanna (1964)	McCann/Wilson (1965)	But Not Really (1965)

Gerald Wilson chronology
Portraits (1964)	McCann/Wilson (1964)	On Stage (1965)

McCann/Wilson is an album by pianist Les McCann with the Gerald Wilson Orchestra recorded in 1964 and released on the Pacific Jazz label.

== Reception ==
Professional ratings
Review scores
Source	Rating
Allmusic	3/5 stars

Allmusic gives the album 3 stars.

== Track listing ==
All compositions by Les McCann except as indicated

1. "Could Be" - 6:06
2. "Stragler" - 2:36
3. "Restin' in Jail" - 3:53
4. "Bailor the Wailor" - 3:05
5. "Maleah" - 4:00
6. "Lot of Living to Do" (Charles Strouse, Lee Adams) - 4:58
7. "Kathleen's Theme" - 2:58
8. "Gus Gus" - 3:14

== Personnel ==
- Les McCann - piano
- Teddy Edwards - tenor saxophone
- Dennis Budimir - guitar
- Victor Gaskin - bass
- Paul Humphrey - drums
- The Gerald Wilson Orchestra arranged and conducted by Gerald Wilson
