= Jazz Blues Fusion =

Live album by John Mayall
- Released: 1972
- Recorded: November–December 1971
- Venue: Boston Music Hall, Hunter College
- Genre: Jazz blues
- Label: Polydor
- Producer: John Mayall

John Mayall chronology
Memories (1971)	Jazz Blues Fusion (1972)	Moving On (1973)

Professional ratings
Review scores
Source	Rating
Christgau's Record Guide	C−

Jazz Blues Fusion is a live album by John Mayall. The first side is from a gig in Boston at the Boston Music Hall on 18 November 1971, and the second side was selected from two concerts at Hunter College, New York, on 3 and 4 December 1971.

== Track listing ==
Original release

All songs by John Mayall

1. "Country Road" - 6:55
2. "Mess Around" - 2:40
3. "Good Time Boogie" - 8:20
4. "Change Your Ways" - 3:25
5. "Dry Throat" - 6:20
6. "Exercise in C Major for Harmonica" - 8:10
7. "Got to Be This Way" - 6:15

== Charts ==
Chart (1972)	Peak position
Australia (Kent Music Report)	39

== Personnel ==
- Freddy Robinson - lead guitar
- Larry Taylor - bass guitar
- John Mayall - vocals, piano, guitar, harmonica
- Ron Selico - drums
- Blue Mitchell - trumpet
- Clifford Solomon - alto & tenor saxophone
