= Cauldron (Fifty Foot Hose album) =

Studio album by Fifty Foot Hose
- Released: 1968
- Recorded: 1967
- Studios: Columbia Recording, San Francisco
- Genres: Psychedelic rock; experimental rock; electronic rock
- Length: 36:45
- Labels: Limelight (original US release); Mercury (original UK release); Big Beat (1996 UK CD reissue)
- Producer: Dan Healy

Professional ratings
Review scores
Source	Rating
AllMusic	4.5/5 stars
Tiny Mix Tapes	5/5 stars
Trouser Press	(favourable)

Cauldron is the first album from San Francisco-based psychedelic rock band Fifty Foot Hose. The album features a variety of homemade synths formed by the hands of bassist Louis "Cork" Marcheschi.

== Music ==
According to BrooklynVegan: "Here is maybe one of the weirdest and strangest records to come out at the time and that’s saying a lot. You would never believe listening to this record that it crept out of San Francisco; it sounds a million miles away from every other band from there. It’s a heady mixture going on here. Everything from straight ahead rock to blues to psych to soul to folk to avant-garde tape manipulation. And there are the weird electronic sounds interspersed between the songs, all the work of one Louis Marcheschi who created the synths from scratch." The album also contains elements of psychedelic soul and blues folk music.

== Legacy ==
According to BrooklynVegan, "the album was all but ignored at the time and [...] the original group disbanded and never made another album."

== Track listing ==
1. "And After" (Cork Marcheschi) 2:05
2. "If Not This Time" (David Blossom) 3:40
3. "Opus 777" (Marcheshi) 0:22
4. "The Things That Concern You" (Larry Evans) 3:25
5. "Opus 11" (Marcheschi) 0:22
6. "Red the Sign Post" (Blossom, Ted Roswicky) 2:55
7. "For Paula" (Marcheschi) 0:24
8. "Rose" (Blossom) 5:03
9. "Fantasy" (Blossom) 10:08
10. "God Bless the Child" (Billie Holiday) 2:42
11. "Cauldron" (Marcheschi, Blossom, Kim Kimsey) 4:55

== Personnel ==
- Nancy Blossom: vocals
- David Blossom: guitars, piano, Kalimba
- Larry Evans: guitars, vocals
- Cork Marcheschi: audio generators, theremin, electronics, siren
- Terry Hansley: electric bass
- Kim Kimsey: drums, percussion
