= Mr. Joy =

Studio album by Paul Bley
- Released: 1968
- Recorded: May 10–12, 1968
- Studio: Audio Recording Inc. Seattle and the University of Washington, Seattle
- Genre: Jazz
- Length: 40:51
- Label: Limelight LS 86060

Paul Bley chronology
Virtuosi (1967)	Mr. Joy (1968)	Paul Bley with Gary Peacock (1963-68)

Mr. Joy is an album led by jazz pianist Paul Bley recorded in the studio and in concert in Seattle in 1968 and released on the Limelight label.

== Reception ==
Professional ratings
Review scores
Source	Rating
Allmusic	4/5 stars
Tom Hull – on the Web	A−

Allmusic awarded the album 4 stars stating: "in the case of this particular recording the more concise performances have proven to be like mother of pearl found on the beach".

== Track listing ==
1. "Only Lovely" (Paul Bley) - 6:20
2. "Kid Dynamite" (Annette Peacock) - 3:10
3. "Nothing Ever Was, Anyway" (Peacock) - 5:44
4. "El Cordobes" (Peacock) - 6:04
5. "Ramblin'" (Ornette Coleman) - 4:44
6. "Touching" (Peacock) - 4:49
7. "Blood" (Peacock) - 6:10
8. "Mr. Joy" (Peacock) - 3:50

== Personnel ==
- Paul Bley - piano
- Gary Peacock - bass
- Billy Elgart - drums
