= Live at Shelly's Manne-Hole =

Live album by Les McCann Ltd.
- Released: 1966
- Recorded: December 31, 1965; Shelly's Manne-Hole, Hollywood, CA
- Genre: Jazz
- Length: 39:55
- Label: Limelight; LM 82036
- Producer: Jack Tracy

Les McCann chronology
Beaux J. Pooboo (1965)	Live at Shelly's Manne-Hole (1966)	Les McCann Plays the Hits (1966)

Live at Shelly's Manne-Hole is an album by pianist Les McCann recorded on New Year's Eve 1965 at Shelly's Manne-Hole and released on the Limelight label.

== Reception ==
Professional ratings
Review scores
Source	Rating
Allmusic	4/5 stars

Allmusic gives the album 4 stars stating "This album is one of the best from this artist's early acoustic days".

== Track listing ==
All compositions by Les McCann except as indicated

1. "She Broke My Heart (And I Broke Her Jaw)" - 4:23
2. "I'll Be On Home" - 5:00
3. "All Alone" (Irving Berlin) - 4:04
4. "My Friends" - 5:15
5. "I Could Have Danced All Night" (From My Fair Lady) (Frederick Loewe, Alan Jay Lerner) - 3:32
6. "That Was the Freak That Was" - 5:35
7. "Young and Foolish" (From Plain and Fancy) (Albert Hague, Arnold B. Horwitt) - 6:47
8. "How's Your Mother (Theme)" - 2:38

== Personnel ==
- Les McCann - piano
- Victor Gaskin - bass
- Paul Humphrey - drums
