= Yard Movement =

Studio album by Monty Alexander
- Released: 1996
- Recorded: 1995
- Genre: Jazz, reggae
- Label: Island Jamaica Jazz

Monty Alexander chronology
Many Rivers to Cross (1995)	Yard Movement (1996)	Echoes of Jilly's (1996)

Yard Movement is an album by the Jamaican American musician Monty Alexander, released in 1996. Alexander supported the album with a UK tour that included Ernest Ranglin; Alexander also undertook a North American tour. With Ranglin's Below the Baseline, Yard Movement was the first album from Island Records' Island Jamaica Jazz label. The album peaked at No. 25 on the Official Jazz & Blues Albums Chart. Alexander subsequently formed a band he named Yard Movement.

== Production ==
Three songs were recorded at the 1995 Montreux Jazz Festival. "Exodus" is a combination of the "Theme of Exodus" with Bob Marley's "Exodus". Lennox "Boogsie" Sharpe played steelpan on "Crying". "Regulator" was inspired by Nat Adderley's "Work Song". Ernest Ranglin played lead guitar on Yard Movement.

== Critical reception ==
Professional ratings
Review scores
Source	Rating
AllMusic	3.5/5 stars
The Guardian	3/4 stars
The Penguin Guide to Jazz on CD	3/4 stars

The St. Louis Post-Dispatch wrote that "a technical bravado and engaging emotionalism mark the eight compositions of Yard Movement, Alexander favoring ripening glissandos to achieve his notable effects." The Guardian determined that Yard Movement "does capture much of the infectious appeal of his live shows, shows how effectively his improvising can avoid repetition when he's hot, and presents a crisp and energetic band." The South Wales Evening Post noted that the album "demonstrates his early musical influences and social experiences." The Houston Chronicle opined that Alexander "sounds like an herbally fortified cocktail pianist gone mad," and listed the album among the best of 1996.

AllMusic wrote: "Essentially smooth bop laid in over heavy reggae basslines, the tracks on Yard Movement ... work surprisingly well, grooving and shifting directions with a deceptive ease, and Ranglin's bright, bubbly guitar is a continual delight throughout."

== Track listing ==
No.	Title	Length
1.	"Exodus": a. "1st Movement – Theme from the Movie Exodus"; b. "2nd Movement – Movement of Jah People"
2.	"Regulator"
3.	"Crying"
4.	"Moonlight City"
5.	"Love Notes"
6.	"Momento"
7.	"Strawberry Hill"
8.	"Sneaky Steppers"
