= Merry Clayton (album) =

Studio album by Merry Clayton
- Released: 1971
- Studio: A&M, Hollywood
- Genre: Soul, Funk
- Label: Ode Records
- Producer: Lou Adler

Merry Clayton chronology
Celebration (1971)	Merry Clayton (1971)	Keep Your Eye On the Sparrow (1975)

Merry Clayton is the third studio album by American soul singer Merry Clayton, released in 1971 on the Ode Records label.

== Reception ==
AllMusic Guide's editorial board gave Merry Clayton four out of five stars and have noted it as an album pick in her catalogue. Billboard called the music "excellent" with "potential to be a monster" commercial success.

== Track listing ==
Side one
No.	Title	Writer(s)	Length
1.	"Southern Man"	Neil Young	3:15
2.	"Walk On In"	Carole King	2:44
3.	"After All This Time"	Carole King	3:09
4.	"Love Me Or Let Me Be Lonely"	Anita Poree, Jerry Peters, Skip Scarborough	3:32
5.	"A Song For You"	Leon Russell	4:15
6.	"Sho'Nuff"	Billy Preston, Joe Greene	2:44

Side two
No.	Title	Writer(s)	Length
7.	"Steamroller"	James Taylor	3:44
8.	"Same Old Story"	Carole King	4:50
9.	"Light On The Hill"	Richard Jones	2:40
10.	"Grandma's Hands"	Bill Withers	3:30
11.	"Whatever"	Leon Ware	2:40

== Personnel ==
- Merry Clayton – vocals
- Wilton Felder – bass
- Paul Humphrey – drums
- David T. Walker – guitar
- Billy Preston, Carole King, Clarence McDonald, Jerry Peters, Joe Sample – keyboards
- Abigail Haness, Jerry Peters, Merry Clayton, Patrice Holloway, James Cleveland – backing vocals
- Curtis Amy – saxophone
- Lou Adler – production
- Jim McCrary – photography
- Hank Cicalo – engineering

== Chart performance ==
Merry Clayton topped out at number 180 on the Billboard 200 and spent 11 weeks on the chart and reached 36 during nine weeks on the Soul charts (later renamed Top R&B/Hip-Hop Albums).
