= Don Robertson (composer) =

American composer (born 1942)

Don Robertson (born 1942) is an American composer.

Don Robertson was born in 1942 in Denver, Colorado, and began studying music with conductor and pianist Antonia Brico at age 3. He attended the University of Colorado, the Juilliard School of Music, and the Institute of Ethnomusicology at UCLA, and has studied composition privately with composer Morton Feldman, counterpoint with Leonard Stein, tabla with Swapan Chaudhuri and Shankar Ghosh, and ragas with David Trasoff.

As one of the first wave of U.S. students of North Indian classical music, he wrote Tabla: A Rhythmic Introduction to Indian Music, published by Peer-Southern International in 1968. At that time he also discovered the base chord for negative music that he named the duochord. Using techniques that were based on this discovery, Robertson recorded his first album on Limelight Records the following year. Titled Dawn (a play on his name and a reference to the dawning of a new age), it has been called the first album of what would later become the new-age music genre. The album, produced by Abe "Voco" Kesh (who also produced rock band Blue Cheer, which some critics consider the first heavy metal band), also incorporated music based on the duochord along with some of the first heavy metal music recorded. Dawn featured positive music on side one of the album, and negative music on side two. A collage, created by Robertson for the back cover, was intended to represent the polarization of dark and light in the U.S.

Robertson recorded his second new-age album Celestial Ascent in 1979 and released it on his DBR Music label into the burgeoning new-age genre. Purchasing synthesizer keyboards the following year, he recorded Resurrection, his first album of pop-classical music. Robertson began giving concerts shared with composer and multi-instrumentalist Constance Demby and recorded new-age composer Aeoleah's first album called Inner Sanctum in his home studio in 1980. Following this, he purchased one of the first digital music computers, the Synclavier II, and recorded his first two albums of digital classical music: Digital Symphony No. 1: Anthem, and Digital Symphony No. 2: Starmusic. By 2003, he had composed and created his Digital Symphonies 3 through 8. Robertson's acoustic classical works include Kopavi, a ballet for orchestra and chorus, the Southern Wind string quartet, and the Jubilation Mass for orchestra and chorus. He is also the author of the music website DoveSong.com that went online in March, 1997.

Robertson is the grandson of Howard S. Robertson, one of the Denver Tramway company's presidents. He wrote a three volume history of the company.

His desire to move from instrumental to vocal music resulted in the 2002 book Songwriting for Dummies written with his wife Mary Ellen Bickford and songwriter Jim Peterik. In 2008, he released his first album of pop-classical songs called Songs of Love and Joy. Robertson and his wife live in Nashville, Tennessee.
