= Eloquence (Oscar Peterson album) =

Live album by Oscar Peterson
- Released: 1965
- Recorded: May 29, 1965
- Venue: Tivoli Gardens Concert Hall, Copenhagen, Denmark
- Genre: Jazz
- Length: 40:49
- Label: Limelight
- Producer: Fred Burkhardt

Oscar Peterson chronology
| I/We Had a Ball (1965) | Eloquence (1965) | With Respect to Nat (1965) |

Eloquence is a live album by jazz pianist Oscar Peterson and his trio, released in 1965.

Eloquence was the Oscar Peterson trio's last album with drummer Ed Thigpen.

== Reception ==
Professional ratings
Review scores
| Source | Rating |
|---|---|
| Allmusic | 3/5 stars |

Writing for AllMusic, critic Scott Yanow wrote "The music heard during this "live from Copenhagen" concert is excellent... Peterson is in particularly strong form on "Misty," "Django," a cooking "Autumn Leaves" and "Moanin'."

== Track listing ==
1. "Children's Tune" (Oscar Peterson) – 1:09
2. "Younger Than Springtime" (Oscar Hammerstein II, Richard Rodgers) – 5:29
3. "Misty" (Johnny Burke, Erroll Garner) – 6:41
4. "Django" (John Lewis) – 7:21
5. "The Smudge" (Peterson) – 5:07
6. "Autumn Leaves" (Joseph Kosma, Johnny Mercer, Jacques Prévert) – 6:42
7. "Moanin'" (Bobby Timmons) – 6:07
8. "Lovers' Promenade" (Peterson) – 2:26

== Personnel ==
- Oscar Peterson – piano
- Ray Brown – double bass
- Ed Thigpen – drums
