= Charlie Parker 10th Memorial Concert =

Live album by Various artists
- Recorded: March 27, 1965 at Carnegie Hall
- Genre: Jazz
- Length: 73:06
- Label: Limelight Records

The Charlie Parker 10th Memorial Concert was recorded March 27, 1965, 10 years after the death of Charlie Parker, at Carnegie Hall in New York City. Its A&R director was Bobby Scott and it was released on Limelight Records the same year. It has yet to be reissued on CD.

It also marks Dave Lambert's final recordings.

Bud Powell played "'Round Midnight" at the concert, but this track was released separately on the album Ups'n Downs.

== Track listing ==
=== Side 1 ===
1. "Um-Hmm! (Ode to Yard)" (7:00)

- Dizzy Gillespie
- James Moody
- Kenny Barron
- Chris White
- Rudy Collins

2. "Groovin' High" (5:50)

Same personnel except Moody play alto sax

3. "Now's the Time" (13:16)

- Roy Eldridge
- Coleman Hawkins
- C. C. Siegel (J. J. Johnson pseudonym)
- Billy Taylor
- Tommy Potter
- Roy Haynes

=== Side 2 ===
4. "Blues for Bird" (4:05)

- Lee Konitz, unaccompanied alto sax solo

5. "Donna Lee" (2:42)

- Dave Lambert
- Billy Taylor
- Tommy Potter
- Roy Haynes

6. " Medley: Bird Watcher/Disorder at the Border" " (11:50)

Solo order on this track
Billy Taylor, Tommy Potter, Kenny Dorham, Lee Konitz, C. C. Siegel, Dizzy Gillespie
