= Victor Gaskin =

American jazz bassist (1934–2012)

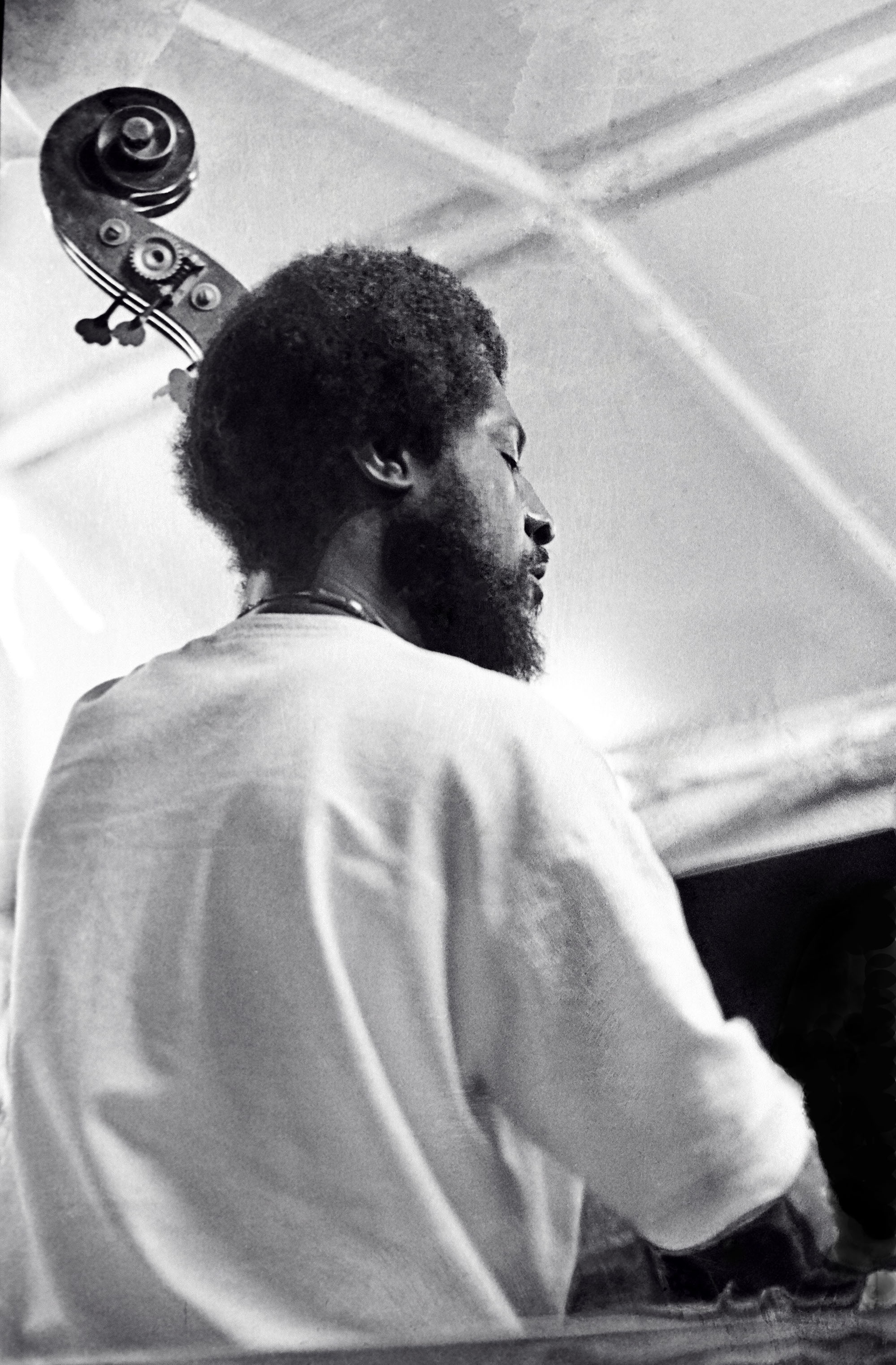
- Gaskin at a Jazzmobile concert in Rochester, New York, 1977

Background information
- Born: Roderick Victor Gaskin; November 23, 1934; The Bronx, New York, U.S.
- Died: July 14, 2012 (aged 77) Frederiksted, Saint Croix, U.S. Virgin Islands
- Genres: Jazz; West Coast jazz
- Occupation: Musician
- Instrument: Double bass
- Formerly of: The Jazz Crusaders; Cannonball Adderley; Duke Ellington; Billy Taylor

Roderick Victor Gaskin (November 23, 1934 – July 14, 2012) was an American jazz bassist.

== Biography ==
Gaskin was born in the Bronx, New York, and moved to Los Angeles in 1962. He began playing with Paul Horn and Red Mitchell and went on to become one of many bassists for the Jazz Crusaders. He also recorded with Curtis Amy and Dupree Bolton before becoming a part of the West Coast jazz scene, accompanying Buddy Collette, Shelly Manne, and Bud Shank.

Between 1966 and 1970, he was a member of Cannonball Adderley's groups, and, in 1970, recorded with Duke Ellington's octet, quintet, quartet and trio.

He started playing with the Billy Taylor Trio in the late 1970s, continuing until 1993, as well as with Johnny Hartman and Hank Jones.

Between 1994 and 2001, Gaskin resided in Singapore and performed regularly at the Four Seasons Hotel with Boni de Souza & Friends for a Sunday Jazz Brunch program. They were pioneers of the Sunday Jazz Brunch scene in Singapore, setting the trend for other similar hotel offerings for years to come. During Gaskin's stay in Singapore, he was also featured on two jazz albums produced by de Souza. The first was a Latin jazz–infused CD featuring Wendy Low (flute), de Souza (piano), Gaskin (bass), and Sanip Ismail (drums). The second release was Eau de Vie, featuring original compositions by de Souza as well as alternative arrangements of jazz standards which featured Gaskin, Farid Ali (guitar), de Souza, Low, and Ismail, with various guest musicians.

Gaskin died on July 14, 2012, aged 77, in Frederiksted, U.S. Virgin Islands.

== Discography ==
With Cannonball Adderley

- Cannonball in Japan (Capitol, 1966)
- Mercy, Mercy, Mercy! Live at "The Club" (Capitol, 1967)
- 74 Miles Away (Capitol, 1967)
- In Person (Capitol, 1968)

With Les McCann

- McCanna (Pacific Jazz, 1964)
- McCann/Wilson (Pacific Jazz, 1965) – with the Gerald Wilson Orchestra
- But Not Really (Limelight, 1965)
- Beaux J. Pooboo (Limelight, 1965)
- Spanish Onions (Pacific Jazz, 1966)
- A Bag of Gold (Pacific Jazz, 1966)
- Live at Shelly's Manne-Hole (Limelight, 1966)
- Live at Bohemian Caverns – Washington, D.C. (Limelight, 1967)

With Billy Taylor

- Live at Storyville (West 54, 1977)
- The Jazzmobile Allstars (Taylor Made, 1989) – with Frank Wess, Jimmy Owens, Ted Dunbar, and Bobby Thomas
- Dr T (GRP, 1992) – featuring Gerry Mulligan

With others

- Monty Alexander, Alexander the Great (Pacific Jazz, 1965)
- Curtis Amy and Dupree Bolton, Katanga! (Pacific Jazz, 1963)
- Hal Galper, The Guerilla Band (Mainstream, 1971)
- Hal Galper, Wild Bird (Mainstream, 1972)
- Johnny Hartman, Once in Every Life (Bee Hive, 1980)
- Paul Horn, Profile of a Jazz Musician (Columbia, 1962)
- The Jazz Crusaders, The Jazz Crusaders at the Lighthouse (Pacific Jazz, 1962)
- The Jazz Crusaders, The Thing (Pacific Jazz, 1965)
- Herbie Mann and Tamiko Jones, A Mann & a Woman (Atlantic, 1967)
- John Mayall, Moving On (Polydor, 1972)
- John Mayall, Ten Years Are Gone (Polydor, 1973)
- Susannah McCorkle, As Time Goes By (CBS/Sony, 1986)
- Oliver Nelson, Swiss Suite (Flying Dutchman, 1972)
- Buddy Terry, Awareness (Mainstream, 1971)
- Clark Terry, Portraits (Chesky, 1989)
- Leon Thomas, Gold Sunrise on Magic Mountain (Mega / Flying Dutchman, 1971)
- Larry Willis, Inner Crisis (Groove Merchant, 1973)
- Gerald Wilson, On Stage (Pacific Jazz, 1965)
- Attila Zoller, Gypsy Cry (Embryo, 1969)
- Boni de Souza, Busy Doing Something (BDS Music, 1998)
- Boni de Souza, Eau de Vie (BDS Music, 2000)
