= But Not Really =

Studio album by Les McCann Ltd.
- Released: 1965
- Recorded: December 1964; Radio Recorders, Hollywood, CA
- Genre: Jazz
- Length: 39:55
- Label: Limelight; LM/LS 86016
- Producer: Jack Tracy

Les McCann chronology
McCann/Wilson (1965)	But Not Really (1965)	Beaux J. Pooboo (1965)

But Not Really is an album by pianist Les McCann recorded in 1964 and released on the Limelight label.

== Reception ==
Professional ratings
Review scores
Source	Rating
Allmusic	4/5 stars

Allmusic gave the album 4 stars stating "For fans of McCann's piano work, there are few recordings that showcase it better -- in the studio at least -- than But Not Really".

== Track listing ==
All compositions by Les McCann except as indicated.

1. "But Not Really" - 5:14
2. "A Little Three-Four" - 5:00
3. "Our Delight" (Tadd Dameron) - 3:37
4. "Sweetie" (Ernie Freeman) - 6:35
5. "We're on the Move Now" - 3:22
6. "Jack V. Schwartz" - 4:19
7. "Little Freak" - 2:48
8. "Yours Is My Heart Alone" (Franz Lehár, Fritz Löhner-Beda, Ludwig Herzer) - 9:00

== Personnel ==
- Les McCann - piano
- Victor Gaskin - bass
- Paul Humphrey - drums
