= Jazzhattan Suite =

Compilation album by Oliver Nelson

Studio album by Oliver Nelson
- Released: 1968
- Recorded: November 13–14, 1967
- Studio: Capitol (New York City)
- Genre: Jazz
- Length: 32:20
- Label: Verve; V6-8731
- Producer: Esmond Edwards

Oliver Nelson chronology
Live from Los Angeles (1967)	Jazzhattan Suite (1968)	Soulful Brass (1968)

Professional ratings
Review scores
Source	Rating
Allmusic	4.5/5 stars

Jazzhattan Suite is a big band jazz album composed and arranged by Oliver Nelson and performed by the Jazz Interactions Orchestra. It was recorded in late 1967 and released in 1968 on Verve Records.

== Track listing ==
1. "A Typical Day in New York " - 4:45
2. "The East Side/The West Side" - 4:12
3. "125th and 7th Avenue" - 6:38
4. "A Penthouse Dawn" - 3:09
5. "One for Duke" - 5:26
6. "Complex City" - 8:10

Recorded on November 13 (#2–6) and November 14 (#1), 1967.

== Personnel ==
- Oliver Nelson - arranger
- Joe Newman - conductor, trumpet
- Burt Collins, Ray Copeland, Ernie Royal, Marvin Stamm - trumpet
- Jimmy Cleveland, Paul Faulise, Benny Powell, Wayne Andre - trombone
- Ray Alonge, Jim Buffington - French horn
- Don Butterfield - tuba
- Phil Woods - alto saxophone, clarinet
- Jerry Dodgion - alto saxophone, clarinet, flute
- George Marge - tenor saxophone, flute, clarinet
- Zoot Sims - tenor saxophone
- Danny Bank - baritone saxophone, flute, bass clarinet
- Patti Bown - piano
- Ron Carter, George Duvivier - bass
- Ed Shaughnessy - drums
- Bobby Rosengarden - percussion, vibes
