= McCanna =

Studio album by Les McCann Ltd.
- Released: 1964
- Recorded: 1964; Atlantic Studios, New York, NY
- Genre: Jazz
- Length: 33:03
- Label: Pacific Jazz; PJ 84
- Producer: Richard Bock

Les McCann chronology
A Bag of Gold (1960-64)	McCanna (1964)	McCann/Wilson (1965)

McCanna is an album by pianist Les McCann recorded in 1964 and released on the Pacific Jazz label.

== Reception ==
Professional ratings
Review scores
Source	Rating
Allmusic	3/5 stars

Allmusic gives the album 3 stars.

== Track listing ==
All compositions by Les McCann except as indicated

1. "McCanna" - 4:32
2. "St. James Infirmary" (Joe Primrose) - 3:58
3. "It Had Better Be Tonight" (Henry Mancini, Johnny Mercer) - 3:45
4. "Que Rico" (Ralph Dollimore) - 2:45
5. "Zulu" - 2:25
6. "Basuto Baby" - 3:03
7. "Falling in Love with Love" (Richard Rodgers, Lorenz Hart) - 5:55
8. "Narobi Nights" - 4:46
9. "Shaam-Pu II" - 3:37

== Personnel ==
- Les McCann - piano
- Victor Gaskin - bass
- Paul Humphrey - drums
- Willie Correa - bongos, congas, timbales
