= A Bag of Gold =

Live album by Les McCann
- Released: 1966
- Recorded: August 3, 1960, October 30 or 29, 1963 and 1964; Rex Productions Studio and Pacific Jazz Studios, Hollywood, CA and the Esquire Theatre, Los Angeles, CA
- Genre: Jazz
- Length: 37:35
- Label: Pacific Jazz; PJ 10107
- Producer: Richard Bock

Les McCann chronology
Spanish Onions (1964)	A Bag of Gold (1966)	McCanna (1964)

A Bag of Gold is a live album by pianist Les McCann recorded in 1960-64 and released on the Pacific Jazz label.

== Reception ==
Professional ratings
Review scores
Source	Rating
Allmusic	3/5 stars

Allmusic gives the album 3 stars.

== Track listing ==
All compositions by Les McCann

1. "The Shampoo" - 8:41
2. "(Shades of) Spanish Onions" - 2:55
3. "The Shout" - 5:35
4. "Gone On and Get That Church" - 3:40
5. "Fish This Week" - 2:40
6. "Kathleen's Theme" - 3:31
7. "The Truth" - 6:45
8. "We'll See Yaw'll After While Ya Heah" - 3:48

== Personnel ==
- Les McCann - piano
- Paul Chambers (tracks 5 & 6), Victor Gaskin (tracks 1–3), Herbie Lewis (tracks 4, 7 & 8) - bass
- Paul Humphrey (tracks 1–3, 5 & 6), Ron Jefferson (tracks 4, 7 & 8) - drums
