= Monty Alexander =

Jamaican pianist (born 1944)

The Honourable Monty Alexander OJ CD
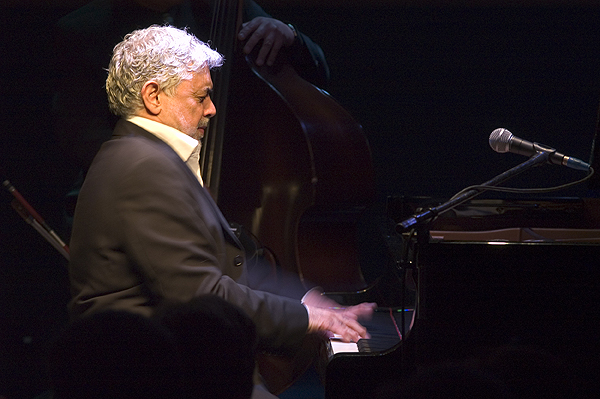
- Alexander performing at Ronnie Scott's, London, in 2006

Background information
- Born: Montgomery Bernard Alexander; 6 June 1944 (age 82); Kingston, Jamaica
- Genres: Jazz, reggae, hard bop, straight-ahead jazz
- Occupation: Musician
- Instruments: Piano, melodica, vocals
- Years active: 1958–present
- Labels: Pacific Jazz, RCA, Verve, MPS, Motéma Music
- Website: montyalexander.com

Montgomery Bernard "Monty" Alexander OJ CD (born 6 June 1944) is a Jamaican American jazz pianist. His playing has a Caribbean influence and bright swinging feeling, with a strong vocabulary of bebop jazz and blues rooted melodies. He was influenced by Louis Armstrong, Duke Ellington, Erroll Garner, Nat King Cole, Oscar Peterson, Ahmad Jamal, Les McCann, and Frank Sinatra. Alexander also sings and plays the melodica. He is known for his surprising musical twists, bright rhythmic sense, and intense dramatic musical climaxes. His recording career has covered many of the well-known American songbook standards, jazz standards, pop hits, and Jamaican songs from his original homeland. Alexander has resided in New York City for many years and performs frequently throughout the world at jazz festivals and clubs.

== Biography ==
Alexander was born on 6 June 1944 in Kingston, Jamaica. He discovered the piano when he was four years old and seemed to have a knack for picking melodies out by ear. His mother sent him to classical music lessons at the age of six and he became interested in jazz piano at the age of 14. Monty boarded at DeCarteret College in Mandeville, then continued his education and musical prowess at Jamaica College. He began playing in clubs, and on recording sessions by Clue J & His Blues Blasters, subbing for Aubrey Adams, whom he describes as his hero, when he was unable to play. Two years later, Alexander directed a dance orchestra (Monty and the Cyclones) and played in the local clubs covering much of the 1960s early rock and pop dance hits. Performances at the Carib Theatre in Jamaica by Louis Armstrong and Nat King Cole left a strong impression on the young pianist.

Alexander and his family moved to Miami, Florida, in 1961, where he played in various nightclubs. One night Monty was brought to the attention of Frank Sinatra and Frank's friend Jilly Rizzo. They were there to see the act in the next room, a Sinatra imitator. Somebody suggested they also check out the kid playing piano in the front room bar, "He's swinging the room pretty good" they said. Thus, Monty was invited to New York City in 1962 to become the house pianist for Jilly Rizzo's night club and restaurant simply called "Jilly's." In addition to performing with Frank Sinatra there, Alexander also met and became friends with bassist Ray Brown and vibist Milt Jackson. He also became friendly with Miles Davis, both men sharing a love of watching boxing matches.

In Los Angeles, in 1964, Alexander recorded his first album, Alexander the Great, for Pacific Jazz, at the age of 20. The album was very energetic and upbeat, with the climax tune being "Blues for Jilly". He recorded with Milt Jackson in 1969, with Ernest Ranglin in 1974 and in Europe the same year with Ed Thigpen. Alexander toured regularly in Europe and recorded there, mostly with his classic trio for MPS Records. He also toured around 1976 with the steelpan player Othello Molineaux. In the mid-1970s, he formed a group consisting of John Clayton on bass and Jeff Hamilton on drums, creating a stir on the jazz-scene in Europe. Their most famous collaboration is Montreux Alexander, recorded during the Montreux Jazz Festival in July 1976.

A year later in 1977, Alexander recorded again with Milt Jackson on the LP Soul Fusion. Jackson used Alexander's trio (with bassist John Clayton and drummer Jeff Hamilton, future big-band co-leaders) for the Pablo recorded LP which was later issued on CD through Original Jazz Classics. Much of the material is obscure (including Jackson's three originals), with Stevie Wonder's "Isn't She Lovely" being the only jazz standard on the album.

Alexander has also played with several singers, among them Ernestine Anderson and Mary Stallings, as well as with other important leaders (Dizzy Gillespie, Benny Golson, Jimmy Griffin and Frank Morgan). In his successive trios, Alexander has played frequently with musicians associated with Oscar Peterson: Herb Ellis, Ray Brown, Mads Vinding, Ed Thigpen and Niels-Henning Ørsted Pedersen. Alexander formed a reggae band in the 1990s, featuring all Jamaican musicians. He has released several reggae albums, including Yard Movement (1996), Stir It Up (1999, a collection of Bob Marley songs), Monty Meets Sly & Robbie (2000), and Goin' Yard (2001). He collaborated again with Ranglin in 2004 on the album Rocksteady.

== Personal life ==
Alexander married the American jazz guitarist Emily Remler in 1981. They divorced in 1985. Alexander lives in Manhattan and is married to Italian jazz singer Caterina Zapponi.

== Awards and honours ==
- Musgrave Medal, Institute of Jamaica, 2000
- Best Live Performance Album, Independent Music Awards, Harlem-Kingston Express, 2012
- Grammy-nominated 2011 CD, Harlem-Kingston Express
- 2014 Soul Train Award-nominated followup, Harlem-Kingston Express, Vol. 2: The River Rolls On, both released on Motéma Records
- 2017 Alexander was conferred with the Order of Griffin-Distinguished Alumnus Award by the Jamaica College Old Boys Association of New York.
- In January 2023, Alexander was appointed a Member of the Order of Jamaica (OJ).

== Discography ==
=== As leader/co-leader ===
Recording date	Title	Label	Year released	Notes
1964	Alexander the Great	Pacific Jazz	1965	Trio, with Victor Gaskin (bass), Paul Humphrey (drums); in concert
1964– 1965	Spunky	Pacific Jazz	1965	Most tracks trio, with Victor Gaskin (bass), Paul Humphrey (drums); some tracks quartet, with Gene Bertoncini (guitar), Bob Cranshaw (bass), Bruno Carr (drums)
1967	Zing!	RCA Victor	1968	Some tracks trio, with Bob Cranshaw (bass), Al Foster (drums); some tracks trio, with Victor Gaskin (bass), Roy McCurdy (drums)
1969–07	This is Monty Alexander	Verve	1969	With orchestra arranged and conducted by Johnny Pate
1970?	Taste of Freedom	MGM	1970	With orchestra arranged and conducted by Johnny Pate
1971–06	Here Comes the Sun	MPS	1972	Quartet, with Eugene Wright (bass), Duffy Jackson (drums), Montego Joe (congas)
1971–12	We've Only Just Begun	MPS	1972	Trio, with Eugene Wright (bass), Bobby Durham (drums); in concert
1973–06	Perception!	MPS	1974	Trio, with Eugene Wright (bass), Bobby Durham (drums)
1974?	Rass!	MPS	1974	Septet, with Ernest Ranglin (lead guitar), Clarence Wears (guitar), Clifton "Jackie" Jackson (electric bass), Sparrow Martin (drums), Noel Seale (congas), Denzil "Pops" Laing (percussion)
1974–10	Love and Sunshine	MPS	1975	Quartet, with Ernest Ranglin (guitar), Eberhard Weber (bass), Kenny Clare (drums)
1974–10	Unlimited Love - Live & In Concert	MPS	1976	Quartet, with Ernest Ranglin (guitar), Eberhard Weber (bass), Kenny Clare (drums); in concert; also released as Monty Strikes Again
1976–05	The Way It Is	MPS	1979	Trio, with John Clayton (bass), Jeff Hamilton (drums)
1976–06	Montreux Alexander - Live! at the Montreux Festival	MPS	1977	Trio, with John Clayton (bass), Jeff Hamilton (drums); in concert
1977–03	Live in Holland	Polydor	1988	Trio, with John Clayton (bass), Jeff Hamilton (drums); in concert
1977–07	Soul Fusion	Pablo	1978	Co-led with Milt Jackson; in concert
1977–09	Cobilimbo	MPS	1978	Sextet, with Vincent Taylor (steel drums), Ernest Ranglin (guitar), Andy Simpkins (bass), Frank Gant (drums), Charles Campell (congas)
1977–09	Estade	MPS	1977	Quartet, with Ernest Ranglin (guitar), Andy Simpkins (bass), Charles Campell (congas)
1978?	Live at Ronnie Scott's	CBS	1978	Trio, with Steve Rodney (bass), Frank Gant (drums)
1978–06	Jamento	Pablo	1978	Septet, with Vince Charles (steel drums), Ernest Ranglin (guitar), Andy Simpkins (bass), Roger Bethelmy (drums), Duffy Jackson (drums), Larry McDonald (percussion)
1979–01	In Tokyo	Pablo	1979	Trio, with Andy Simpkins (bass), Frank Gant (drums)
1979–08	Facets	Concord	1980	Trio, with Ray Brown (bass), Jeff Hamilton (drums)
1979–09	Just In Time	Live At EJ's	1996	Trio, with Bob Maize (bass), Frank Gant (drums)
1979–10	So What?	Black & Blue	1979	Solo piano
1980–03	Ivory & Steel	Concord	1980	Sextet, with Othello Molineaux and Len "Boogsie" Sharpe (steel drums), Gerald Wiggins [sic] (bass), Frank Gant (drums), Robert Thomas Jr. (percussion)
1980–08	Trio	Concord	1981	Trio, with Herb Ellis (guitar), Ray Brown (bass)
1980–10	Solo	Jeton	1980	Solo piano
1980–12	Monty Alexander – Ernest Ranglin	MPS	1981	Duo, with Ernest Ranglin
1981–05	Fingering	Atlas	1981	Trio, with Ray Brown (bass), Shelly Manne (drums)
1982–03	Triple Treat	Concord	1982	Trio, with Herb Ellis (guitar), Ray Brown (bass)
1982–03	Overseas Special	Concord	1984	Trio, with Herb Ellis (guitar), Ray Brown (bass); in concert
1982–12	Look Up	Atlas	1983	Trio, with Andy Simpkins (bass), Duffy Jackson (drums)
1983–03	Reunion in Europe	Concord	1984	Trio, with John Clayton (bass), Jeff Hamilton (drums); in concert
1983–03	The Duke Ellington Song Book	MPS/Verve	1984	Duo, with John Clayton (bass)
1984–11	Caribbean Duet	Harmonic	1985	Duo, with Michel Sardaby (piano); in concert
1985?	Full Steam Ahead	Concord	1985	Trio, with Ray Brown (bass), Frank Gant (drums)
1985–10	Friday Night	Limetree	1987	Quartet, with Reggie Johnson (bass), Ed Thigpen (drums), Robert Thomas Jr. (percussion); in concert
1985–10	Saturday Night	Limetree	1988	Quartet, with Reggie Johnson (bass), Ed Thigpen (drums), Robert Thomas Jr. (percussion); in concert
1985–10	The River	Concord Jazz	1990	Trio, with John Clayton (bass), Ed Thigpen (drums)
1985–11, 1985–12	Threesome	Soul Note	1986	Trio, with Niels-Henning Ørsted Pedersen (bass), Grady Tate (drums, vocals)
1986–04	Li'l Darlin'	Lob	1988	Trio, with John Clayton (bass), Jeff Hamilton (drums)
1986–12	To Nat, With Love	Zanda	1987	Sextet, with Harry "Sweets" Edison (trumpet), John Collins (guitar), John Clayton (bass), Jeff Hamilton (drums), Robert Thomas Jr. (percussion); in concert
1987–06	Triple Treat II	Concord Jazz	1988	Most tracks trio, with Herb Ellis (guitar), Ray Brown (bass); some tracks quartet, with John Frigo (violin) added; in concert
1987–06	Triple Treat III	Concord Jazz	1989	Most tracks trio, with Herb Ellis (guitar), Ray Brown (bass); some tracks quartet, with John Frigo (violin) added; in concert
1988–02, 1988–03	Jamboree	Concord Picante	1988	Septet, with Othello Molineaux and Leo "Boogsie" Sharp (steel drums), Marshall Wood (bass), Bernard Montgomery (electric bass), Marvin "Smitty" Smith (drums), Robert Thomas Jr. (percussion)
1991–03	Live at the Cully Select Jazz Festival	Limetree	1991	Trio, with Lynn Seaton (bass), Duffy Jackson (drums); in concert
1992–06	Caribbean Circle	Chesky	1992	
1994–09	Steamin'	Concord	1995	Trio, with Ira Coleman (bass), Dion Parson (drums)
1994–09	Monty Alexander at Maybeck	Concord	1995	Solo piano; in concert
1995–02	Many Rivers To Cross	Meldac	1995	With Ernest Ranglin
1995	Yard Movement	Island	1996	With Ernest Ranglin
1996–05	To the Ends of the Earth	Concord Picante	1996	Alexander's Ivory & Steel band
1996–12	Echoes of Jilly's	Concord Jazz	1997	Trio, with John Patitucci (bass), Troy Davis (drums)
1999?	Stir It Up: The Music of Bob Marley	Telarc	1999	
1999–12	Monty Meets Sly and Robbie	Telarc Jazz	2000	With Sly Dunbar, Robbie Shakespeare
2000–10	Goin' Yard	Telarc Jazz	2001	In concert
2002–03, 2002–04	My America	Telarc Jazz	2002	
2003?	Impressions in Blue	Telarc	2003	Trio, with Hassan Shakur (bass), Mark Taylor (drums)
2003–06	Rocksteady	Telarc	2004	With Ernest Ranglin
2004–05	Live at the Iridium	Telarc	2005	Most tracks trio, with Hassan Shakur (bass), Mark Taylor (drums); some tracks quartet, with Robert Thomas Jr. (percussion) added; in concert
2005?	Concrete Jungle: The Music of Bob Marley	Telarc	2006	
2008?	The Good Life: Monty Alexander Plays the Songs of Tony Bennett	Chesky	2008	Trio, with Lorin Cohen (bass), George Fludas (drums)
2008?	Calypso Blues: The Songs of Nat King Cole	Chesky	2009	Trio, with Lorin Cohen (bass), George Fludas (drums)
2006 – 2010–06	Harlem-Kingston Express	Motéma	2011	In concert
2007 – 2010	Uplift	Jazz Legacy	2011	Most tracks trio, with Hassan Shakur (bass), Herlin Riley (drums); some tracks trio, with Hassan Shakur (bass), Frits Landesbergen (drums); in concert
2010–09	Love Me Tender	Venus	2011	Trio, with Hassan Shakur (bass), Willie Jones III (drums)
1988 – 2013	Harlem-Kingston Express, Vol. 2: The River Rolls On	Motéma	2014	
2011 – 2013?	Uplift 2	Jazz Legacy	2013	Most tracks trio, with John Clayton (bass), Jeff Hamilton (drums); some tracks trio, with Hassan Shakur (bass), Frits Landesbergen (drums); in concert
2017?	Road Dog	MACD	2017	This is Monty Alexander's own label
2019?	Wareika Hill: Rasta-Monk Vibrations	MACD	2019	

=== Compilations ===
Year recorded	Title	Label	Notes
1998	The Concord Jazz Heritage Series	Concord	
2000	Ballad Essentials	Concord	
2000	Island Grooves	Concord	Compilation of Jamboree + Ivory & Steel
2002	Triple Scoop	Concord	Compilation of Triple Treat + Triple Treat II + Triple Treat III
2003	Straight Ahead	Concord	Compilation of Overseas Special + Trio
2004	Steaming Hot	Concord	Compilation of Full Steam Ahead + Steamin'
2005	Jazz Calypso: Monty Alexander Caribbean Best	JVC	
2007	Alexander The Great: Monty Swings On MPS	MPS /Universal	4-CD set; compilation of 'Here Comes The Sun', 'We've Only Just Begun', 'Perception!', 'Love And Sunshine', 'Unlimited Love', 'The Way It Is'

=== As sideman ===
With Ernest Ranglin

- Ranglypso (MPS, 1974)
- Below the Bassline (Island, 1996)
- Rocksteady (Telarc, 2004)
- Order of Distinction (Milk River Music, 2009)

With Milt Jackson

- That's the Way It Is (Impulse!, 1970) – live rec. 1969
- Just the Way It Had to Be (Impulse!, 1970) – live rec. 1969
- Montreux '77 with Ray Brown (Pablo Live, 1977) – live
- A London Bridge (Pablo, 1982)
- Mostly Duke (Pablo, 1982)
- Memories of Thelonious Sphere Monk (Pablo, 1982)

With Ray Brown

- Montreux '77 with Milt Jackson (Pablo Live, 1977) – live
- Live at the Concord Jazz Festival (Concord, 1979) – live
- Summerwind (Jeton, 1981)[2LP]
- A Ray Brown 3 (Concord, 1983)
- Ray Brown, Monty Alexander, & Russell Malone (Telarc, 2002)
- Walk On (Telarc, 2003)

With others

- 1969 Quincy Jones and Bill Cosby, The Original Jam Sessions 1969 (Concord)
- 1971 Quincy Jones, Smackwater Jack (A&M)
- 1977 Dizzy Gillespie, Montreux '77: Dizzy Gillespie Jam (Pablo Live)
- 1979 Phyllis Hyman, Somewhere in My Lifetime (Arista)
- 1980 Marshal Royal, Royal Blue (Concord Jazz)
- 1981 Ernestine Anderson, Never Make Your Move Too Soon (Concord Jazz) – rec. 1980
- 1983 Dieter Goal, Goal (Corona Music Jazz) – rec. 1982
- 1986 Jimmy Smith, Go for Whatcha' Know (Blue Note)
- 1987 Barney Kessel, Spontaneous Combustion (Contemporary)
- 1989 Lee "Scratch" Perry, Chicken Scratch (Heartbeat)
- 1990 Howard Alden, Snowy Morning Blues (Concord Jazz)
- 1991 Natalie Cole, Unforgettable... with Love (Elektra)
- 1994 Benny Golson, That's Funky (Meldac Jazz)
- 1994 The Skatalites, Hi-Bop Ska! (Shanachie)
- 1996 Clifton Anderson, Landmarks (Milestone)
- 1996 Mary Stallings, Manhattan Moods (Concord Jazz)
- 1996 Toots Thielemans, Verve Jazz Masters #59 (Verve) – compilation
- 2000 Clark Terry, One on One (Chesky) – rec. 1999
- 2000 Caterina Zapponi, Universal Lovesongs (Inak)
- 2002 Kristian Jørgensen, Meeting Monty (Stunt)
- 2003 V.A., A Tribute to Charlie Parker - Birdmen & Birdsongs Volume 1 (Storyville Films)[DVD-Video]
- 2004 Harvey Mason, With All My Heart (BMG)
- 2006 Chuck Redd, Chuck Redd Remembers Barney Kessel: Happy All the Time (Arbors)
- 2008 Tony Bennett, A Swingin' Christmas (Featuring The Count Basie Big Band) (Columbia)
- 2010 Bucky Pizzarelli, Back in the Saddle Again (Arbors)
- 2010 Hilary Kole, You Are There: Duets (Justin Time) – rec. 2006–2010
- 2011 Etienne Charles, Kaiso (Culture Shock Music)
- 2011 Grace Kelly and Phil Woods, Man With the Hat (Pazz Productions)

== Filmography ==
- Al Di Meola, Stanley Clarke, Jean-Luc Ponty – Live at Montreux (1994)
- New Morning – The Paris Concert (2008)

== See also ==
- List of jazz pianists
