= Merry Clayton =

American soul and gospel singer (b. 1948)

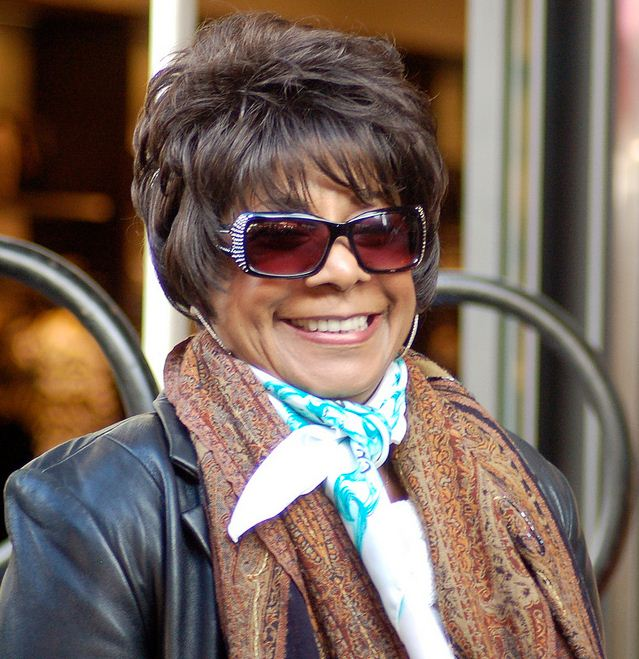
- Clayton in 2012

Background information
- Born: December 25, 1948 (age 77); New Orleans, Louisiana, U.S.
- Genres: Soul, gospel
- Occupation: Singer
- Years active: 1962–present
- Labels: Ode/A&M; MCA Records; Motown Gospel/Universal

Merry Clayton (born December 25, 1948) is an American soul and gospel singer. She contributed vocals to numerous tracks and worked with many major recording artists for decades, including a duet with Mick Jagger on the Rolling Stones song "Gimme Shelter". Clayton is prominently featured in 20 Feet from Stardom, the Oscar-winning documentary about background singers and their contributions to the music industry.

== Early life ==
Clayton was born in Gert Town, New Orleans, Louisiana, and she was named "Merry" because she was born on Christmas Day. She is the daughter of Eva B. Clayton and the Reverend A.G. Williams, Sr.

Clayton was raised in New Orleans and spent much of her time in New Zion Baptist Church, her father's parish. After moving to Los Angeles, she met members of the Blossoms, who convinced her to pursue a music career.

== Career ==
Clayton's voice as a backing singer can be heard on songs by Pearl Bailey, Phil Ochs, Burt Bacharach, Tom Jones, Joe Cocker, Linda Ronstadt, Carole King, Tori Amos and on several tracks from Neil Young's debut album. Clayton is credited as having recorded with Elvis Presley, but her name does not appear in Elvis's sessionographies.

=== 1960s ===
Clayton began her recording career in 1962 at the age of 14. She first sang "Who Can I Count On?" as a duet with Bobby Darin on his album You're the Reason I'm Living. In 1963, she recorded the first released version of "The Shoop Shoop Song (It's in His Kiss)", the same year that Betty Everett's version reached the top 10 on the Billboard Hot 100. Early in her career, Clayton performed with Ray Charles (as one of the Raelettes). At the time, Charles was the only artist her father would allow her to see at a live performance.

Clayton is best known for her 1969 duet with Mick Jagger on the Rolling Stones song "Gimme Shelter" (on some releases her name is misspelled as "Mary"). According to Jagger, the collaboration happened partially by chance: Jagger stated that the band thought "it'd be great to have a woman come do the...chorus." They called Clayton "randomly" in the middle of the night in Los Angeles, and she showed up to the studio "in curlers" and contributed her parts in a few takes, which Jagger remarked was "pretty amazing." Clayton performed her parts while pregnant, soon afterward suffering a miscarriage. Clayton was the band's second choice for the part: The Stones had asked Bonnie Bramlett to sing on the song, but Bramlett's husband Delaney Bramlett refused to let her perform with the Stones.

=== 1970s ===
In 1970, Clayton recorded her own version of "Gimme Shelter", and it became the title track of her debut solo album, released that year. Her solo version peaked at No. 73 on the pop charts. Her version was the first of five singles under her name to enter the Billboard Hot 100. The same year, she performed a live version of "Lift Every Voice and Sing" for the soundtrack for the Robert Altman film Brewster McCloud, and she contributed vocals to Nicolas Roeg's film Performance.

In 1971, she co-wrote the song "Sho' Nuff" about her mother.

In 1972, she starred as the original Acid Queen in the first London production of The Who's Tommy.

In 1973, Clayton featured prominently on Ringo Starr's "Oh My My", which reached Billboard's Top 10 the following year. With her frequent partner Clydie King, Clayton sang backing vocals on Lynyrd Skynyrd's "Sweet Home Alabama".

In the mid-1970s Clayton sang on The Blackbyrds' R&B hit "Rock Creek Park" and continued to release solo albums throughout the next decade.

=== 1980s ===
Clayton's soundtrack work continued into the 1980s, including "You're Always There When I Need You", the title track for the 1980 film The Nude Bomb, and the song "Yes" from Dirty Dancing, which hit No. 45 on the Hot 100.

In the mid-1980s, Clayton was in the gospel group Brilliance, formed by Della Reese. They released an album on Atlanta International Records in 1986.

In 1987, Clayton co-starred with Ally Sheedy in the film Maid to Order. The same year, she played the character Verna Dee Jordan in the final season of Cagney & Lacey.

In 1989, Clayton recorded a cover version of "Almost Paradise" with Eric Carmen.

=== 1990s and later years ===
In 1994, Clayton sang backing vocals and the "Man with the Golden Gun" bridge for Tori Amos's hit "Cornflake Girl".

In 2006, Clayton provided backing vocals for Sparta's album Threes on the songs "Atlas" and "Translations". In 2013, she released The Best of Merry Clayton, a compilation of her favorite songs.

Clayton was featured in the documentary film 20 Feet from Stardom (2013), which premiered at the Sundance Film Festival, and won the Oscar for best documentary at the 86th Academy Awards. 20 Feet from Stardom also won the 2015 Grammy Award for Best Music Film, with the award being presented to the featured artists and the production crew for the film.

In 2014, Clayton provided vocals for G. Love & Special Sauce's album Sugar, and in 2015, she was featured on two tracks of Coldplay's album A Head Full of Dreams.

In 2021, her solo album Beautiful Scars was released.

== Personal life ==
Clayton was married to jazz artist Curtis Amy from 1970 until his death in 2002. Their son, Kevin Amy, has also pursued a musical career. Her brother is Little Feat percussionist Sam Clayton.

In 1969, Clayton had a miscarriage upon returning home from recording "Gimme Shelter", according to the Los Angeles Times.

On June 16, 2014, Clayton was critically injured and almost died after being involved in a car crash in Los Angeles, that caused both of her legs to be amputated at the knees due to her suffering "profound trauma to her lower extremities".

== Discography ==
=== Studio albums ===
Year	Album	Label	Peak chart positions	
Year	Album	Label	US	US R&B
1970	Gimme Shelter	Ode	—	—
1971	Celebration	Ode	—	—
1971	Merry Clayton	Ode	180	36
1975	Keep Your Eye on the Sparrow	Ode	146	50
1979	Emotion	MCA Records	—	—
1994	Miracles	CGI	—	—
2021	Beautiful Scars	Motown Gospel/Ode/Universal	—	—
"—" denotes releases that did not chart

=== Compilation albums ===
Year	Album	Label	Peak chart positions	
Year	Album	Label	US	US R&B
2013	The Best of Merry Clayton	Ode/Epic/SME	—	61
"—" denotes releases that did not chart

=== Singles (selected) ===
Year	Single	Peak chart positions					Album
Year	Single	US	US R&B	AUS	UK	CAN	Album
1970	"Gimme Shelter"	73	—	—	—	63	Gimme Shelter
1970	"Country Road"	103	—	—	—	—	Gimme Shelter
1972	"After All This Time"	71	42	—	—	—	Merry Clayton
1973	"Oh No Not My Baby"	72	30	49	—	—	Non-album song
1975	"Keep Your Eye on the Sparrow"	45	42	—	—	71	Keep Your Eye on the Sparrow
1980	"Emotion"	—	53	—	—	—	Emotion
1988	"Yes"	45	79	—	70	77	Dirty Dancing: Original Soundtrack from the Vestron Motion Picture
"—" denotes releases that did not chart

== Filmography ==
Year	Film	Role
1984	Blame It on the Night	herself
1987	Maid to Order	Audrey James
2013	20 Feet from Stardom	herself
