= Limelight Records =

American jazz record label (founded 1962)

- Parent company: Mercury Records
- Founded: 1962
- Country of origin: United States

Limelight Records was a jazz record label and subsidiary of Mercury Records started in 1962. The catalogue included music by Art Blakey, Dizzy Gillespie, Earl Hines, Milt Jackson, Gerry Mulligan, and Oscar Peterson.

Originally headed by Quincy Jones, its activities were directed by the producer Jack Tracy. Though mainly a jazz label, it also released rock, experimental, electronic, and Indian music.

The label's masters are now controlled by Verve Records and The Island Def Jam Music Group, which has reissued some of the Limelight releases on CD.

The Limelight label was renowned for releasing artistically ambitious gatefold albums with full-colour full-page illustrated inserts, sometimes with die-cut pages, making each album a unique visual as well as audio document.

== Discography ==
=== Albums ===
#	Artist	Album
86001	Blakey, Art	'S Make It
86002	Various Artists	I/We Had a Ball
86003	Baker, Chet	Baby Breeze
86004	Mulligan, Gerry	Butterfly with Hiccups
86005	Gibbs, Terry	El Nutto
86006	Jackson, Milt	In a New Setting
86007	Gillespie, Dizzy	Jambo Caribe
86008	Kirk, Roland	I Talk with the Spirits
86009	Adderley, Cannonball & John Coltrane	Cannonball and Coltrane
86010	Peterson, Oscar	Canadiana Suite
86011/12	Brown, Clifford	The Immortal Clifford Brown
86013	Dolphy, Eric	Last Date
86014	Three Sounds, The	Three Moods
86015	Mingus, Charles	Mingus Revisited
86016	McCann, Les	But Not Really
86017	Various Artists	Charlie Parker 10th Memorial Concert
86018	Blakey, Art	Soul Finger
86019	Baker, Chet	Baker's Holiday
86020	Hines, Earl	Grand Reunion 1
86021	Mulligan, Gerry	If You Can't Beat 'Em, Join 'Em!
86022	Gillespie, Dizzy	The New Continent
86023	Peterson, Oscar	Eloquence
86024	Jackson, Milt	Milt Jackson at the Museum of Modern Art
86025	McCann, Les	Beaux J. Pooboo
86026	Three Sounds, The	Beautiful Friendship
86027	Kirk, Roland	Rip Rig and Panic
86028	Hines, Earl	Grand Reunion 2
86029	Peterson, Oscar	With Respect to Nat
86030	Mulligan, Gerry	Feelin' Good
86031	McCann, Les	Beaux J. Pooboo
86032	Adderley, Cannonball & Nat	Them Adderleys
86033	Kirk, Roland	Slightly Latin
86034	Blakey, Art	Buttercorn Lady
86035	Peterson, Oscar	With Respect to Nat
86036	McCann, Les	Live at Shelly's Manne-Hole
86037	Three Sounds, The	Today's Sounds
86038	Blakey, Art	Hold On, I'm Coming
86039	Peterson, Oscar	Blues Etude
86040	Mulligan, Gerry	Something Borrowed - Something Blue
86041	McCann, Les	Les McCann Plays the Hits
86042	Gillespie, Dizzy	The Melody Lingers On
86043	McCann, Les	Bucket o' Grease
86044	Peterson, Oscar	Soul Español
86045	Jackson, Milt	Born Free
86046	McCann, Les	Live at Bohemian Caverns - Washington, DC
86047	Various Artists	Images Fantastiques
86048	Various Artists	Panorama Electronique
86049	Henry, Pierre	Le Voyage
86050	Dissevelt, Tom & Kid Baltan	Songs of the Second Moon
86051	The Percussions Of Strasbourg	The Percussions of Strasbourg
86052	Hambraeus, Bengt	Constellations and Interferences
86053	Bhattacharya, Deben	Classical Ragas of India
86054	Mecki Mark Men	Mecki Mark Men
86055	Badings & Raaijmakers	Evolutions and Contrasts
86056	Khan, Lateef Ahmed	Ragas: Streams of Light – Three North Indian Ragas
86057	Various Artists	Santur, Tunbuk, and Tar: Music and Drum Rhythms from Iran
86058	White, Ruth	Seven Trumps from the Tarot Card/Pinions
86059	Henry, Pierre	Variations for a Door and a Sigh
86060	Bley, Paul	Mr. Joy
86061	Various Artists	Response/Electronic Music from Norway
86062	Fifty Foot Hose	Cauldron
86063	Sound of Feeling, The	Spleen
86064	Percussions of Strasbourg, The	Signals
86065	Henry, Pierre	Mass for Today/The Green Queen
86066	White, Ruth	Flowers of Evil
86067	Robertson, Don	Dawn
86068	Mecki Mark Men	Running in the Summernight
86069	Beaver & Krause	Ragnarok - Electronic Funk
86070	Electronic Concept Orchestra, The	Moog Groove
86071	Jackson, Melvin	Funky Skull
86072	Electronic Concept Orchestra, The	Electric Love
