= Abu Talib (musician) =

American blues musician (1939–2009)

- Born: Fred Leroy Robinson; February 24, 1939; Memphis, Tennessee, U.S.
- Died: October 8, 2009 (aged 70) Lancaster, California, U.S.
- Genres: R&B, blues
- Occupation: Musician
- Instrument: Guitar
- Years active: 1956–94
- Labels: Queen, Checker, Pacific Jazz, Enterprise

Abu Talib (born Fred Leroy Robinson; February 24, 1939 – October 8, 2009) was an American blues and R&B guitarist.

== Career ==
Born to an African American family in Memphis, Tennessee, he was raised in the state of Arkansas and moved to Chicago, Illinois, in 1956. Inspired as a guitarist by Joe Willie Wilkins, he first recorded that year, backing harmonica player Birmingham Jones. In 1958, he began touring with Little Walter, and after seeing a jazz band perform was inspired to learn music formally at the Chicago School of Music. He also began working with Howlin' Wolf, recording with him such notable blues classics as "Spoonful", "Back Door Man" and "Wang Dang Doodle". In the mid-1960s, he played with R&B singers Jerry Butler and Syl Johnson, before joining Ray Charles' band in Los Angeles. While there, he recorded the instrumental "Black Fox", which became a minor pop hit reaching No. 56 on the Billboard Hot 100 and No. 29 on the R&B chart.

In the early 1970s, he worked with English blues bandleader John Mayall, playing on the album Jazz Blues Fusion, and recorded LPs with trumpeter Blue Mitchell. He also recorded two albums in his own name - At The Drive In and Off The Cuff, on which he was supported by Joe Sample and Wilton Felder of The Crusaders - for Enterprise, a subsidiary of Stax Records. He also worked with Earl Gaines and Jimmy Rogers in the 1950s and 1960s, Monk Higgins and Stanley Turrentine in the 1970s, and Bobby Bland in the 1980s. In addition to his studio and touring collaborations, Talib also recorded solo, re-emerging in 1994 with an album of his own compositions, The Real Thing at Last.

== Personal life ==
Talib converted to Islam in 1975 and changed his name to Abu Talib.

He had seven children with his first wife, Mary, who predeceased him. He remarried and had a daughter with his second wife, Zakiyyah.

On October 8, 2009, Talib died of cancer in Lancaster, California. He was 70.

== Discography ==
=== Singles ===
- 1962: "The Buzzard/The Hawk" - Queen
- 1966: "The Creeper/Go-Go-Girl" - Checker
- 1968: "The Coming Atlantis/Before Six" - World Pacific
- 1968: "The Oogum Boogum Song/Black Fox" - World Pacific
- 1968: "I Likes Yah/Stinger" - Cobblestone
- 1970: "Carmalita/Stone Stallion" - Liberty
- 1977: "I Like to Dance/Kneebone" - ICA

=== Albums ===
- 1968: The Coming Atlantis (later entitled Black Fox) World Pacific
- 1968: Hot Fun in the Summertime World Pacific/Liberty
- 1971: At the Drive-In - Enterprise/Polydor/P-Vine
- 1973: Off the Cuff - Enterprise/P-Vine
- 1994: The Real Thing at Last - Son Pat
- 1999: Bluesology - Ace

=== Collaborations ===
With Monk Higgins

- 1968: Extra Soul Perception - Solid State

With Milt Jackson

- 1969: Memphis Jackson - Impulse!

With John Mayall

- 1972: Jazz Blues Fusion - Polydor
- 1973: Moving On - Polydor
- 1973: Ten Years Are Gone - Polydor

With Blue Mitchell

- 1969: Bantu Village -Blue Note
- 1972: Blues' Blues - Mainstream
- 1973: Graffiti Blues - Mainstream

== Filmography ==
- Moon Over Harlem (1939)
- Boarding House Blues (1948)
- Killer Diller (1948)

== Bibliography ==
- The Freddy Robinson - Abu Talib Story by Bill Dahl. Blues & Rhythm - The Gospel Truth No. 145 (Christmas 1999), pp. 8 – 13
