= Bobby Bryant (musician) =

- Born: May 19, 1934; Hattiesburg, Mississippi, United States
- Died: June 10, 1998 (aged 64) Los Angeles, California, United States
- Genres: Jazz
- Occupation: Musician
- Instruments: Trumpet, flugelhorn
- Labels: Chess, Cadet, World Pacific Jazz
- Formerly of: Charles Mingus; Oliver Nelson; Gerald Wilson; Clayton-Hamilton Jazz Orchestra

Bobby Bryant (May 19, 1934 – June 10, 1998) was an American jazz trumpeter and flugelhornist.

== Biography ==
Bryant was born in Hattiesburg, Mississippi, and played saxophone in his youth. He moved to Chicago in 1952, where he studied at the Cosmopolitan School of Music until 1957. Remaining in the city until 1960, he played with Red Saunders, Billy Williams, and other ensembles. He relocated to New York City in 1960 and then Los Angeles in 1961, where he became a fixture on the West Coast jazz scene. He led his own groups in addition to playing with Vic Damone, Charles Mingus, Oliver Nelson, Gerald Wilson, Frank Capp/Nat Pierce, and the Clayton-Hamilton Jazz Orchestra. He also worked as a studio musician and a music educator.

Perhaps his most famous solo was in the song "L-O-V-E" recorded with Nat King Cole in 1964.

Bryant had sustained health problems in the 1990s which reduced his activity to part-time. He died in Los Angeles of a heart attack at the age of 64.

== Discography ==
=== As leader ===
- Big Band Blues (Vee-Jay, 1961 [1974])
- Ain't Doing Too B-A-D, Bad (Cadet, 1967)
- Earth Dance (Pacific Jazz, 1969)
- The Jazz Excursion into "Hair" (Pacific Jazz, 1969)
- Swahili Strut (Cadet, 1971)

=== As arranger ===
With Gene Ammons

- Free Again (Prestige, 1971)

With Peggy Lee

- A Natural Woman (Capitol, 1969)

=== As sideman ===
With Brass Fever

- Time Is Running Out (Impulse!, 1976)

With Earth, Wind & Fire

- I Am (Columbia, 1979)

With Clare Fischer

- Manteca! (Pacific Jazz, 1965)

With Benny Golson

- Killer Joe (Columbia, 1977)

With The Gene Harris All Star Big Band

- Tribute to Count Basie (Concord Jazz, 1988)

With Eddie Harris

- How Can You Live Like That? (Atlantic, 1976)

With Richard "Groove" Holmes

- Six Million Dollar Man, (RCA/Flying Dutchman, 1975)

With Quincy Jones

- Roots (A&M, 1977)

With Stan Kenton

- Kenton / Wagner (Capitol, 1964)

With B. B. King

- L.A. Midnight (ABC, 1972)

With Blue Mitchell

- Bantu Village (Blue Note, 1969)

With Oliver Nelson

- Sound Pieces (Impulse!, 1966)
- Live from Los Angeles (Impulse!, 1967)
- Soulful Brass with Steve Allen (Impulse!, 1968)
- Black, Brown and Beautiful (Flying Dutchman, 1969)
- Skull Session (Flying Dutchman, 1975)
- Stolen Moments (East Wind, 1975)

With Lalo Schifrin

- More Mission: Impossible (Paramount, 1968)
- Mannix (Paramount, 1968)
- Gypsies (Tabu, 1978)

With Horace Silver

- Silver 'n Brass (Blue Note, 1975)

With The Three Sounds

- Coldwater Flat (Blue Note, 1968)

With Gerald Wilson

- On Stage (Pacific Jazz, 1965)
- Feelin' Kinda Blues (Pacific Jazz, 1965)
- Everywhere (Pacific Jazz, 1968)
- California Soul (Pacific Jazz, 1968)

With Jimmy Witherspoon

- Baby, Baby, Baby (Prestige, 1963)
