= Monk Higgins =

American saxophonist (1930–1986)

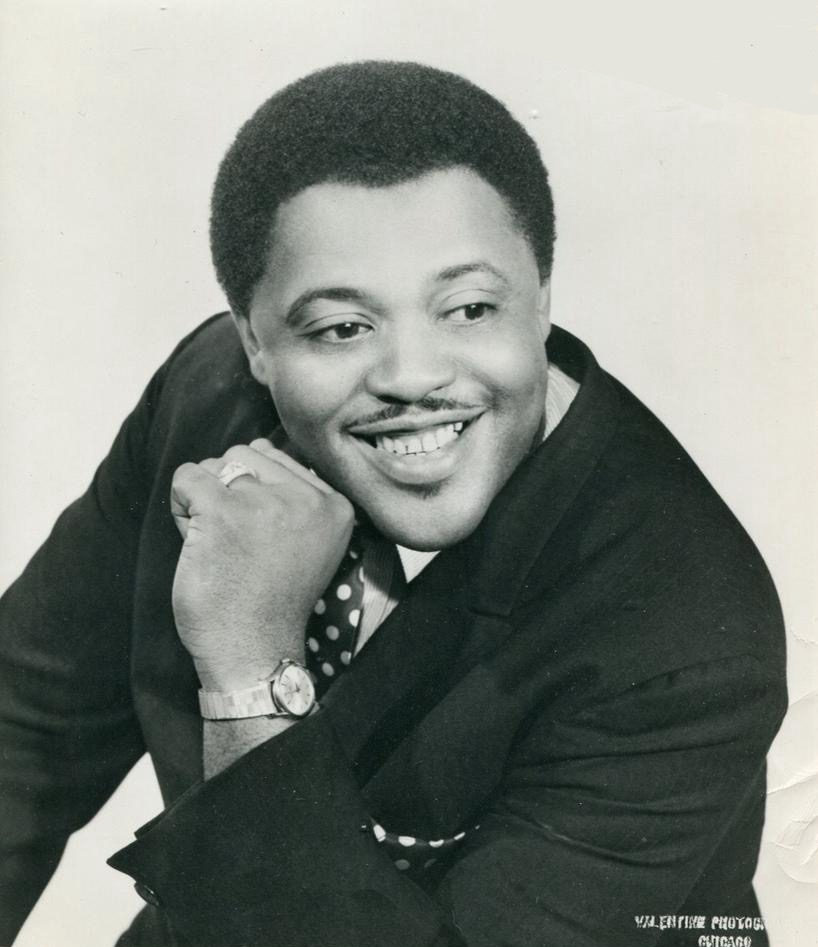
- Higgins c. 1967

Background information
- Born: Milton James Bland; October 3, 1930; Menifee, Arkansas, U.S.
- Died: July 3, 1986 (aged 55) Los Angeles, California, U.S.
- Genres: R&B, blues, crossover, jazz
- Occupation: Musician
- Instrument: Tenor Saxophone
- Years active: 1962–1986
- Labels: One-derful, Satellite, St. Lawrence, Chess, Canyon, Blue Note, UA, Solid State, Buddah

Milton James Bland (October 3, 1930 – July 3, 1986), better known as Monk Higgins, was an American composer, producer, arranger, tenor saxophonist, keyboardist, and music executive born in Menifee, Arkansas.

== Biography ==
Milton James Bland was born to J.T. Bland (March 15, 1906 - February 7, 1958) and Alma Howell (June 8, 1899 - June 9, 1964), along with his sister, Violet Rose Bland (January 17, 1932 - August 29, 1986)

He attended Arkansas State University and majored in music theory and orchestration. He was 6'3" and played football at ASU, and later in life turned down an offer to coach football at the school. After ASU, he taught high school music in Hayti, Missouri before he continued his studies at the Chicago School of Music. He also earned a living as a social worker and a school teacher. In 1962, he joined the artists and repertoire department of One-derful Records.

In 1965, Bland moved to Dick Simon's Satellite Record Company where he was the director of A&R and the principal producer. Chess Records was their distributor. He also wrote arrangements with Burgess Gardner and became one of the architects of Chicago's hard-soul sound. He worked briefly at Chess Records in 1967. He worked with Holly Maxwell at Star Records and Junior Wells at Bright Star. In the mid 60s, Milton Bland adopted the moniker "Monk Higgins". He would use it for the bulk of his career; although, he did resume use of his birth name towards the end of his life.

Higgins's biggest hits were the instrumental tracks "Who-Dun-It?" (which reached #30 on the US R&B chart in 1966), and "Gotta Be Funky" (#22 on the US R&B chart in 1972). His instrumental "Ceatrix Did It" (1967) was the sign-off song for soul-DJ 'Dr. Rock' on WMPP, East Chicago Heights, Illinois. Higgins worked with a variety of musicians including Gene Harris, Bobby Bland, The Chi-Lites, Junior Wells, Freddy Robinson, Muddy Waters, Cash McCall, Etta James, Blue Mitchell and The 3 Sounds.

Higgins' 1967 move to Los Angeles was prompted by the offer to orchestrate strings for Nina Simone's Gifted & Black. He soon began working on other projects like Stanley Turrentine's Flipped-Flipped Out and The 3 Sounds' Elegant Soul. He wrote most of the material for Blue Mitchell's Collision in Black and also released a solo album, Monk Higgins in MacArthur Park (1968) .

In 1970, Higgins formed his own label named Stonegood. In 1975, he composed the music for the Pam Grier film Sheba, Baby. In the 70s, he worked extensively in television advertising. Higgins wrote jingles for Toyota and Mogen David. In 1976, he joined Al Bell's newly formed label Independent Corp. of America.

In the 80s, his band 'The Specialties' were the featured artists at Marla Gibb's jazz club in Los Angeles.

His wife, Virginia P. Bland (b. October 12, 1931), was also a composer. They married on June 15, 1959. She was often credited as "Vee Pea" on his records. They had three daughters: Joan Elizabeth Bland (b. February 12, 1969), Janesse Paula Bland (b. January 12, 1970), and June Gerria Bland (b. September 29, 1971). On July 3, 1986, Higgins died from a respiratory ailment at Centinela Hospital in Inglewood, California. He is buried at Inglewood Park Cemetery.

== Discography ==
=== As leader ===
45 rpm singles

- "Sawdust" / "The Fat Man" (Earth 500, 1965)
- "Mister Luckee" / "Ain't That Hateful" (Satellite 2010, 1966)
- "Who-Dun-It?" / "These Days Are Filled With You" (St. Lawrence 1013, 1966)
- "Now That's Sayin' Sumpin'" / "Easy Does It" (St. Lawrence 1016, 1966)
- "What Fah" / "Ceatrix Did It" (St. Lawrence 1022, 1966)
- "Different Strokes (For Different Folks)" / "How Come?" (Chess 1998, 1967)
- "Comin' Up The Middle" / "Monkin' Around" (Chess 2025, 1967)
- "Yesterday" / "The Look Of Love" (Chess 2034, 1967)
- "Mac Arthur Park" / "Vee Pea" (Dunhill 4139, 1968)
- "Watermelon Man" / "Extra Soul Perception" (Solid State 2525, 1968)
- "I'll Still Be There" / "Baby You're Right" (Sack 711, 1970)
- "Arkansas Yard Bird" / "I'll Still Be There" (Sundi 317, 1971)
- "Gotta Be Funky" / "Big Water Bed" (United Artists 50897, 1972)
- "Treat Her Like A Lady" / "Two In One" (United Artists 50936, 1972)

LP albums

- Mac Arthur Park (Dunhill 50036, 1968)
- Extra Soul Perception (Solid State 18046, 1969)
- Heavyweight (United Artists 5592, 1972)
- Little Mama (United Artists LA005, 1972)
- Dance to the Disco Sax of Monk Higgins (Buddah 5619, 1974)
- Sheba, Baby (Buddah 5634, 1975) with Alex Brown
- Live in Mac Arthur Park (Buddah, 1975)

=== As producer and sideman ===
- Etta James. Call My Name (1967); producer.
- Blue Mitchell. Collision in Black (1968); producer, composer, arranger, tenor saxophone, piano, organ.
- The Three Sounds. Elegant Soul (1968); producer, composer, arranger, conductor.
- Jimmy McCracklin. The Stinger Man (1969); producer, composer, arranger, conductor, piano, organ.
- Blue Mitchell. Bantu Village (1969); composer, arranger, conductor, piano, percussion.
- Freddy Robinson. The Coming Atlantis (1969); producer, conductor, arranger, organ.
- The 3 Sounds. Soul Symphony (1969); producer, composer, arranger, conductor.
- Freddy Robinson. Hot Fun In The Summertime (1970); producer, conductor, arranger.
- Gene Harris. The 3 Sounds (1971); composer, arranger, organ.
- Freddy Robinson. Off the Cuff (1973); producer, arranger, conductor, electric piano.
- Bobby Bland, Come Fly With Me (1978); producer, arranger.
- Bobby Bland, I Feel Good, I Feel Fine (1979); producer, conductor, arranger.
- Bobby Bland, Sweet Vibrations (1980); producer, conductor, arranger, piano.
- Bobby Bland, Try Me, I'm Real (1981); producer, piano.
- Bobby Bland, Tell Mr. Bland (1983); producer, conductor, arranger, percussion.‡
- Who-Dun-It, You're a Winner (1985); producer, conductor, tenor saxophone.+

+As Milton Bland ‡As both Milton Bland and Monk Higgins

== In popular culture ==
In 1987, "One Man Band (Plays All Alone)", from Higgins' 1974 LP Dance to the Disco Sax, was featured on the breakbeat series Ultimate Breaks and Beats (SBR 517).

Higgin's 1969 cover of "Little Green Apples" on Extra Soul Perception was sampled in Gang Starr's "Code of the Streets" (1994).

For "Bad Boy No Go a Jail" on the Clockers soundtrack, Mega Banton sampled Higgins' "Sittin' Duck" from Elegant Soul by The 3 Sounds.

Higgins received renewed attention in 2024 after Mustard sampled two songs from his 1968 LP MacArthur Park: the title track and a cover of Ray Charles' "I Believe to My Soul". Mustard used the samples in beats he sold to Kendrick Lamar. A snippet of "MacArthur Park" appears in Lamar's "TV Off", and the horn fanfares in "I Believe to My Soul" form one of the audio signatures in "Not Like Us".

== See also ==
- Jazz
- Jazz funk
- R&B
- Soul music
