= Shirley Horn discography =

Artist discography

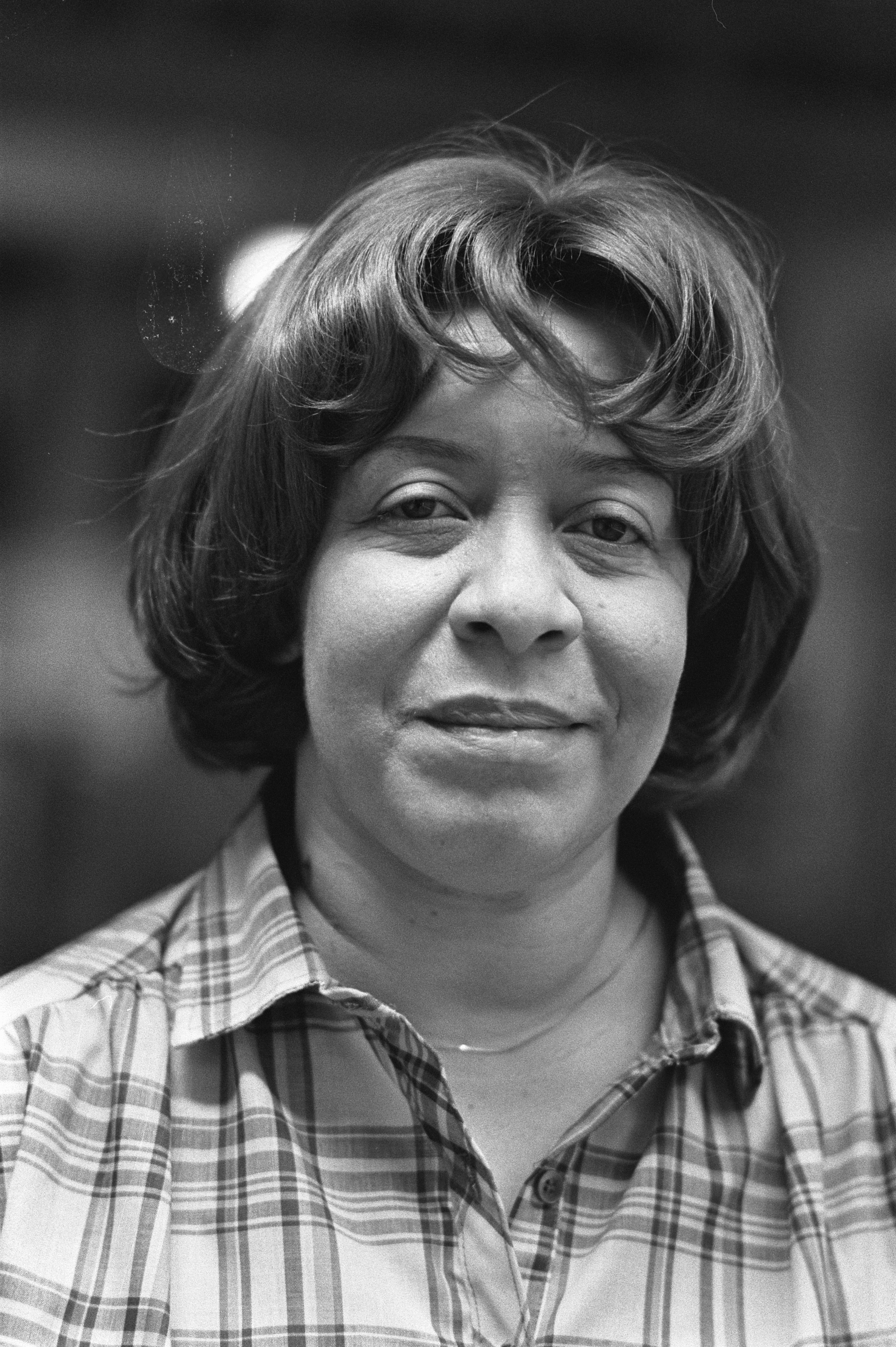
- Horn in 1981
- Studio albums: 17
- Live albums: 8
- Compilation albums: 8
- Singles: 4
- Video albums: 2

The discography of American jazz singer and pianist Shirley Horn includes seventeen studio albums, eight live albums, eight compilations, two video albums, four singles and five promotional singles.

== Albums ==
=== Studio albums ===
Title	Details	Peak chart positions	
Title	Details	US Jazz	US Trad. Jazz
Embers and Ashes	Released: 1960; Label: Stere-O-Craft; Formats: LP	—	—
Loads of Love	Released: March 1963; Label: Mercury Records; Formats: LP, CD, digital download	—	—
Shirley Horn with Horns	Released: December 1963; Label: Mercury Records; Formats: LP, CD, digital download	—	—
Travelin' Light	Released: 1965; Label: ABC-Paramount Records; Formats: LP, CD, digital download	—	—
Where Are You Going	Released: 1973; Label: Perception Records; Formats: LP, Stereo 8	—	—
A Lazy Afternoon	Released: 1979; Label: SteepleChase Records; Formats: LP, CD, digital download	—	—
All of Me	Released: April 7, 1987; Label: CBS Records; Formats: LP, CD	—	—
Softly	Released: 1988; Label: Audiophile Records; Formats: CD, LP	—	—
Close Enough for Love	Released: June 1989; Label: Verve Records; Formats: CD, LP, cassette, digital download	—	5
You Won't Forget Me	Released: February 1991; Label: Verve Records; Formats: CD, cassette, digital download	—	1
Here's to Life	Released: May 12, 1992; Label: Verve Records; Formats: CD, cassette, digital download	47	1
Light Out of Darkness (A Tribute to Ray Charles)	Released: September 21, 1993; Label: Verve Records; Formats: CD, cassette, digital download	19	2
The Main Ingredient	Released: February 27, 1996; Label: Verve Records; Formats: CD, digital download	23	7
Loving You	Released: February 11, 1997; Label: Verve Records; Formats: CD, digital download	12	4
I Remember Miles	Released: June 9, 1998; Label: Verve Records; Formats: CD, cassette, digital download	15	5
You're My Thrill	Released: March 13, 2001; Label: Verve Records; Formats: CD, digital download	14	8
May the Music Never End	Released: June 24, 2003; Label: Verve Records; Formats: CD, digital download	22	10
"—" denotes items which did not chart in that country.

=== Live albums ===
Title	Details	Peak chart positions	
Title	Details	US Jazz	US Trad. Jazz
Live at the Village Vanguard	Released: 1961; Label: Can-Am Records; Formats: LP	—	—
All Night Long	Released: July 1981; Label: SteepleChase Records; Formats: LP, CD, digital download	—	—
Violets for Your Furs	Released: 1981; Label: SteepleChase Records; Formats: LP, CD, digital download	—	—
The Garden of the Blues	Released: 1985; Label: SteepleChase Records; Formats: LP, CD, digital download	—	—
I Thought About You	Released: 1987; Label: Verve Records; Formats: LP, CD, cassette, digital download	—	10
I Love You, Paris	Released: September 1994; Label: Verve Records; Formats: CD, cassette, digital download	22	4
Live at the 1994 Monterey Jazz Festival	Released: August 5, 2008; Label: Monterey Jazz Festival Records; Formats: CD, digital download	—	—
Live at the 4 Queens	Released: September 16, 2016; Label: Resonance Records; Formats: CD, digital download	20	12
"—" denotes items which did not chart in that country.

=== Compilation albums ===
Title	Details	Peak chart positions	
Title	Details	US Jazz	US Trad. Jazz
Shirley Horn	Released: 1992; Label: Gitanes Jazz Productions; Formats: CD, cassette	—	—
At Northsea	Released: 1996; Label: SteepleChase Records; Formats: CD	—	—
Jazz 'Round Midnight	Released: January 27, 1998; Label: Verve Records; Formats: CD, digital download	—	—
Ultimate	Released: May 25, 1999; Label: Verve Records; Formats: CD, digital download	—	—
Quiet Now: Come a Little Closer	Released: 1999; Label: Verve Records; Formats: CD, digital download	—	—
But Beautiful: The Best of Shirley Horn	Released: October 11, 2005; Label: Verve Records; Formats: CD, digital download	20	8
The Swingin' Shirley Horn	Released: November 13, 2009; Label: Verve Records; Formats: CD, digital download	—	—
Shirley Horn With Friends	Released: May 4, 2018; Label: Verve Records; Formats: CD, digital download	—	—
"—" denotes items which did not chart in that country.

=== Video albums ===
Title	Details
Here's to Life	Released: 1992; Label: PolyGram Video; Formats: VHS, LD
Live at the Village Vanguard	Released: 2007; Label: Image Entertainment; Formats: DVD

=== Other albums ===
Title	Details
In Good Company (Joe Williams album)	Released: 1989; Label: Verve; track 8, Shirley Horn, piano and vocals: "Too Good to Be True"
Marian McPartland's Piano Jazz With Guest Shirley Horn	Released: February 28, 2006; Label: The Jazz Alliance; Formats: CD, digital download

== Singles ==
Title	Year	Album
"Wild Is The Wind" "Mountain Greenery"	1961	Embers and Ashes
"Do It Again" "Wild Is Love"	1962	Loads of Love
"For Love Of Ivy" "Have You Tried To Forget"	1968	For Love Of Ivy
"Hit the Road Jack" "Makin' Whoopie"	1993	Light Out of Darkness (A Tribute to Ray Charles)

=== Promotional singles ===
Title	Year	Album
"Travelin' Light" "Some Of My Best Friends Are The Blues"	1965	Travelin' Light
"If You Want Love" "The Spell You Spin"	1968	Non album single
"Don't Let The Sun Catch You Cryin'" "You Won't Forget Me"	1991	You Won't Forget
"Here's To Life" "Return To Paradise"	1992	Here's To Life
"How Am I To Know?" "If You Love Me"	1992	Here's To Life
