= Close Enough for Love =

Close Enough for Love may refer to:

- "Close Enough for Love" (song), a 1979 jazz standard written by Johnny Mandel and Paul Williams
- Close Enough for Love (Peggy Lee album), 1979
- Close Enough for Love (Andy Williams album), 1986
- Close Enough for Love (Shirley Horn album), 1989
- Close Enough for Love (Fleurine album), 1999
- Close Enough for Love, a 1991 album by Mike Metheny
