= You're My Thrill =

You're My Thrill may refer to:

- "You're My Thrill" (song), a 1933 popular song written by Jay Gorney and Sidney Clare
- You're My Thrill (Doris Day album), 1949
- You're My Thrill (Shirley Horn album), 2001
- You're My Thrill (Elaine Dame album), 2014
