= Steve Williams (jazz drummer) =

American jazz drummer (born 1956)

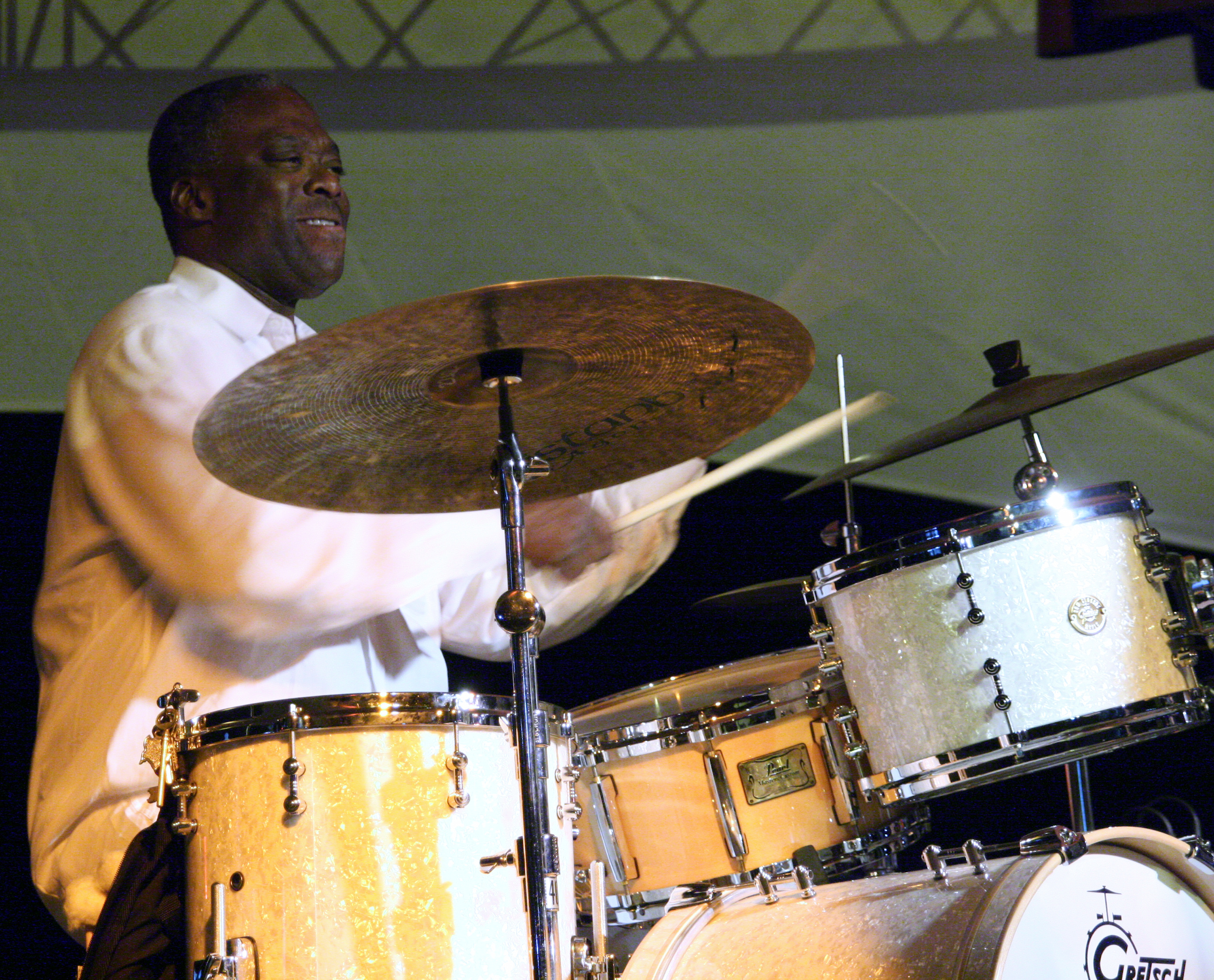
- Williams in 2008

Background information
- Born: Stephen Edward Williams; January 7, 1956 (age 70); Rochester, New York, U.S.
- Genres: Jazz
- Occupation: Drummer
- Years active: 1980–present
- Label: Elabeth
- Website: abrushfire.com

Stephen Edward Williams (born January 7, 1956) is an American jazz drummer.

== Discography ==
As leader

- 2006: New Incentive (Elabeth)

With Shirley Horn

- 1985: The Garden of the Blues
- 1987: All of Me
- 1987: I Thought About You
- 1988: Softly
- 1989: Close Enough for Love
- 1991: You Won't Forget Me
- 1992: Here's to Life
- 1993: Light Out of Darkness (A Tribute to Ray Charles)
- 1994: I Love You, Paris
- 1996: The Main Ingredient
- 1997: Loving You
- 1998: I Remember Miles
- 2001: You're My Thrill
- 2003: May the Music Never End
- 2005: But Beautiful

With others

- 1988: Code Violations – Gary Thomas
- 1989: Masters from Different Worlds – Clifford Jordan and Ran Blake
- 1989: In Good Company – Joe Williams
- 1990: Sarah: Dedicated to You – Carmen McRae
- 1991: For My Lady – Toots Thielemans
- 1992: Glengarry Glen Ross (soundtrack) – Various
- 1995: Ramona – Jeffery Smith
- 1996: Monterey Jazz Festival – 40 Legendary Years – Various
- 1997: Ballads from the Black Sea – Datevik
- 1998: American Rhapsody – Vienna Art Orchestra
- 1999: Trio+Strings – John Hicks
- 2000: Sketches of James – Various
- 2000: The Face of Love – Eugene Maslov
- 2000: The Legacy Lives On – The Legacy Band
- 2008: Wild Is Love – Jamie Broumas
- 2013: A Beautiful Friendship: Remembering Shirley Horn – Mark Murphy
- 2017: Swingin' on A Star – Tardo Hammer
- 2024: Right Now! – Tardo Hammer
