= Softly (Shirley Horn album) =

Studio album by Shirley Horn
- Released: 1988
- Recorded: November 1987
- Studio: Mapleshade, Baltimore
- Genre: Jazz
- Length: 51:50
- Label: Audiophile
- Producer: Joel E. Siegel

Shirley Horn chronology
All of Me (1987)	Softly (1988)	Close Enough for Love (1989)

Professional ratings
Review scores
Source	Rating
AllMusic	4/5 stars
Encyclopedia of Popular Music	3/5 stars

Softly is a studio album by American singer and pianist Shirley Horn, released in 1988 by Audiophile Records. The album was recorded in October 1987 and was her only release for Audiophile. The producer was Joel E. Siegel.

In 2018, the album was reissued on limited edition vinyl by ORG Music. A different cover was used for the design, and song "How Long Has This Been Going On" was also excluded.

== Track listing ==
No.	Title	Writer(s)	Length
1.	"Since I Fell for You"	Buddy Johnson	7:13
2.	"You're My Thrill"	Jay Gorney; Sidney Clare	4:20
3.	"How Long Has This Been Going On?"	George Gershwin; Ira Gershwin	7:05
4.	"My, How the Time Goes By"	Carolyn Leigh; Cy Coleman	5:12
5.	"Summer (Estate)"	Bruno Brishetti; Bruno Martino; Joel E. Siegel	8:38
6.	"Forget Me"	Valerie Parks Brown	3:37
7.	"I Watch You Sleep"	Siegel; Richard Rodney Bennett	6:35
8.	"Softly, as I Leave You"	Giorgio Calabrese; Hal Shaper; Antonio De Vita	3:00
9.	"Dindi"	Aloysio De Oliveira; Antônio Carlos Jobim; Ray Gilbert	6:10
Total length:			51:50

== Personnel ==
- Shirley Horn – vocals, piano
- Charles Ables – bass
- Steve Williams – drums
- Pierre Sprey – engineering
- George H. Buck, Jr. – executive producer
- Don Jarvis – mastering
- Joel E. Siegel – producer
