= But Beautiful: The Best of Shirley Horn =

Greatest hits album by Shirley Horn
- Released: October 11, 2005
- Recorded: 1987–2005
- Genre: Jazz
- Length: 63:01
- Label: Verve

Shirley Horn chronology
May the Music Never End (2003)	But Beautiful: The Best of Shirley Horn (2005)	The Swingin' Shirley Horn (2009)

Professional ratings
Review scores
Source	Rating
All About Jazz	4.5/5 stars
AllMusic	4/5 stars
The Austin Chronicle	4/5 stars
Encyclopedia of Popular Music	4/5 stars

But Beautiful: The Best of Shirley Horn is a greatest hits album by American jazz singer and pianist Shirley Horn, released on October 11, 2005, by Verve Records. The album, among other things, also contains three live recordings made at the Au Bar in New York in January 2005.

== Track listing ==
No.	Title	Writer(s)	Length
1.	"I Just Found Out About Love"	Harold Adamson; Jimmy McHugh	2:27
2.	"You Won't Forget Me"	Kermit Goell; Fred Spielman	7:10
3.	"You Don't Know Me"	Eddy Arnold; Cindy Walker	2:58
4.	"The Great City"	Curtis Lewis	2:05
5.	"Fever"	Eddie Cooley; John Davenport	4:45
6.	"If You Love Me"	Marguerite Monnot; Geoffrey Parsons	6:04
7.	"A Time for Love"	Johnny Mandel; Paul Francis Webster	6:45
8.	"Come Dance with Me"	Sammy Cahn; James Van Heusen	2:51
9.	"Nice 'n' Easy" (Live)	Alan Bergman; Michael Keith; Lew Spence	4:53
10.	"But Beautiful"	Johnny Burke; Van Heusen	4:42
11.	"Here's to Life"	Artie Butler; Phyllis Molinary	5:37
12.	"Jelly, Jelly" (Live)	Billy Eckstine; Duke Henderson; Earl Hines	4:54
13.	"Loads of Love" (Live)	Richard Rodgers	3:07
14.	"I Didn't Know What Time It Was" (Live)	Lorenz Hart; Rodgers	4:43
Total length:			63:01

== Charts ==
Chart performance for But Beautiful: The Best of Shirley Horn
Chart (2005)	Peak position
US Top Jazz Albums (Billboard)	20
US Top Traditional Jazz Albums (Billboard)	8
