= Stuff Smith =

American jazz violinist (1909–1967)

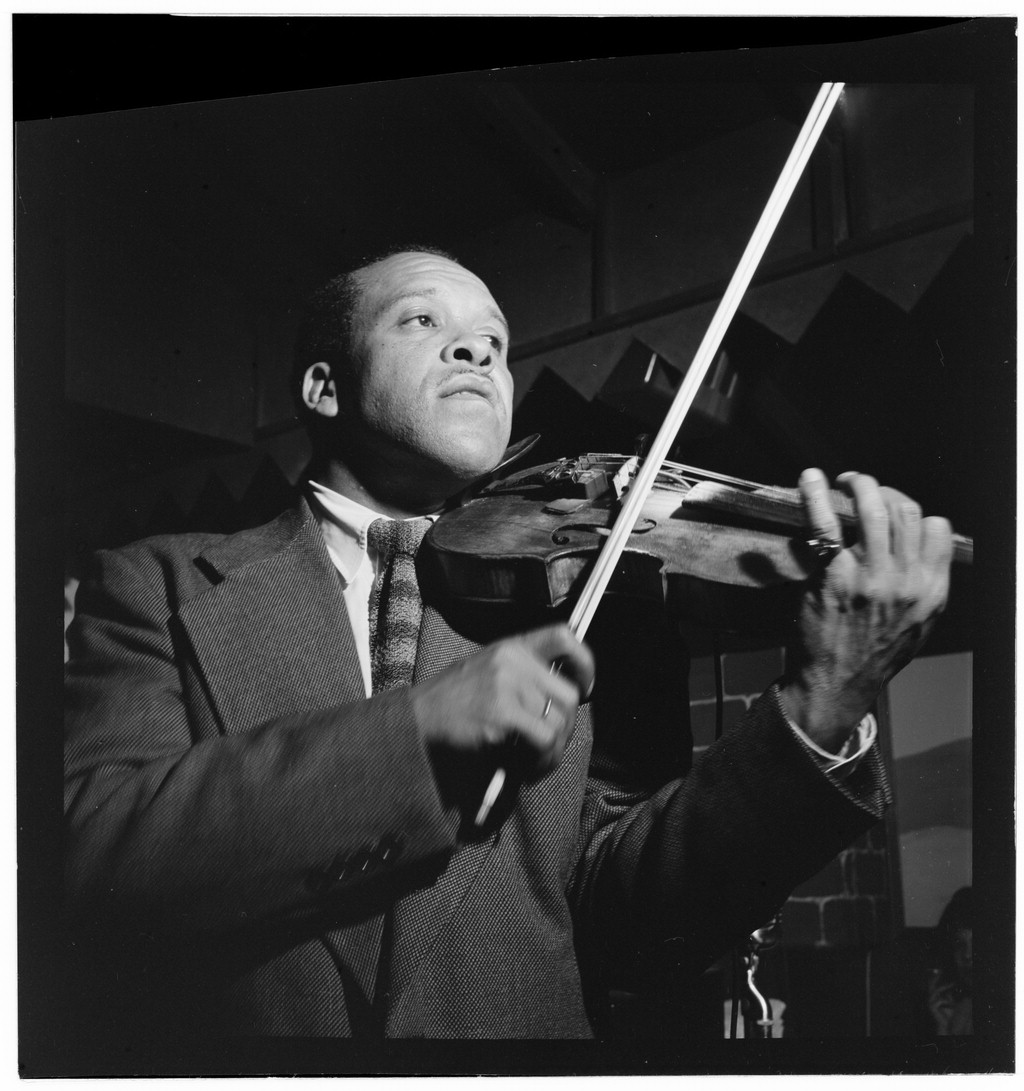
- Stuff Smith by William P. Gottlieb

Background information
- Born: Hezekiah Leroy Gordon Smith; August 14, 1909; Portsmouth, Ohio, U.S.
- Died: September 25, 1967 (aged 58) Munich, Germany
- Genre: Jazz
- Occupations: Musician, singer
- Instrument: Violin
- Years active: 1920s–1967

Hezekiah Leroy Gordon Smith (August 14, 1909 – September 25, 1967), better known as Stuff Smith, was an American jazz violinist. He is well known for the song "If You're a Viper" (the original title was "You'se a Viper").

Smith was, along with Stéphane Grappelli, Michel Warlop, Svend Asmussen, Frans Poptie, Ray Nance, Eddie South, and Joe Venuti, one of jazz music's preeminent violinists of the swing era.

== Biography ==
Hezekiah Leroy Gordon Smith was born on August 14, 1909, in Portsmouth, Ohio, and studied violin with his father. Smith cited Louis Armstrong as his primary influence and inspiration to play jazz, and like Armstrong, was a vocalist as well as instrumentalist. In the 1920s, he played in Texas as a member of Alphonse Trent's band. After moving to New York City he performed regularly with his sextet at the Onyx Club starting in 1935, and also with Coleman Hawkins, Charlie Parker, Dizzy Gillespie, and later, Sun Ra.

After being signed to Vocalion Records in 1936, he had a hit with "I'se a Muggin'" and was billed as Stuff Smith and His Onyx Club Boys. He recorded for Vocalion in 1936, Decca in 1937, and Varsity in 1939–1940.

He is featured in several numbers on the Nat King Cole Trio album, After Midnight.

Part of Smith's performance at what is considered the first outdoor jazz festival, the 1938 Carnival of Swing on Randall's Island, turned up unexpectedly on audio engineer William Savory's discs, which were self-recorded off the radio at the time, then long-sequestered. Some newsreel footage survived but no audio of the festival was thought to have survived until the discs were acquired in 2012 by Loren Schoenberg, executive director of the National Jazz Museum in Harlem.

Smith was critical of the bebop movement, although his own style represented a transition between swing and bebop. He is credited as being the first violinist to use electric amplification techniques on a violin. He was one of the writers of the song "It's Wonderful" (1937), which was often performed by Louis Armstrong and Ella Fitzgerald throughout their careers. Smith moved to Copenhagen in 1965, and then performed actively in Europe. His later years were littered with health problems and spells in hospital, with his heavy consumption of alcohol resulting in parts of his stomach and liver being removed. He died at the age of 58 in Munich in 1967. He is buried at Klakring Cemetery in Jutland, Denmark.

Stuff Smith is one of the 57 jazz musicians photographed in the 1958 portrait A Great Day in Harlem.

Around 1965, Smith recorded about six minutes of themes intended for a violin concerto. In 2026, composer Dave Soldier and violin soloist Curtis Stewart created "Stuff Smith's Unfinished Violin Concerto", an 18-minute expansion on the themes with the Prague Filmharmonic conducted by Adam Klemens.

== Discography ==
Stuff Smith at AllMusic

=== As leader ===
- Stuff Smith (Verve, 1957)
- Dizzy Gillespie and Stuff Smith (Verve, 1957)
- Have Violin, Will Swing (Verve, 1958)
- Cat On A Hot Fiddle (Verve, 1959)
- Sweet Swingin' Stuff (20th Century Fox, 1959)
- Cat on a Hot Fiddle (Verve, 1960)
- Herb Ellis & Stuff Smith Together! (Epic, 1963)
- Stuff and Steff, with Stephane Grappelli (Barclay, 1966)
- Violin Summit with Stephane Grappelli, Svend Asmussen, Jean-Luc Ponty, (SABA, 1967)
- Black Violin (MPS, 1972)
- Violins No End, with Stephane Grappelli (Pablo, 1984)
- The 1943 Trio (Circle, 1988)
- Live at the Montmartre (Storyville, 1988)
- Live in Paris (France's Concert, 1965/1988)
- Hot Violins, with Svend Asmussen, Kenny Drew Trio, Poul Olsen (Storyville, 1991)
- Stuff Smith – 1939-1944 compilation (Classics, 1999)
- Late Woman Blues, with Henri Chaix Trio (Storyville, 2001)
- The Complete 1944 Rosenkrantz Apartment Transcription Duets (AB Fable, 2002)
- 1944-46: Studio, Broadcast, Concert & Apartment Performances (AB Fable, 2002)
- 1944 & 1945 Performances (AB Fable, 2004)
- Swingin' Stuff (Storyville, 2005)
- Five Fine Violins: Celebrating 100 Years (Storyville, 2010)
- 1937 (AB Fable, 2010)

=== As sideman ===
With Ella Fitzgerald

- Ella Fitzgerald Sings the Duke Ellington Songbook Volume One (Verve, 1975)
- The Duke Ellington Songbook, Volume Two: The Small Group Sessions (Verve, 1982)

With Dizzy Gillespie

- Dee Gee Days: The Savoy Sessions (Savoy, 1976)
- Dizzy Gillespie (Dee Gee, 1952)
- The Champ (Savoy, 1956)
- School Days (Regent, 1957)

With Sun Ra

- Deep Purple (Saturn, 1973)
- Dreams Come True (Saturn, 1973)
- Sound Sun Pleasure!! (Evidence, 1991)

With others

- Nat King Cole, After Midnight (Capitol, 1956)
- Roy Eldridge, Count Basie Orchestra, Americans in Sweden (Jazz Society, 1983)
- Earl Hines, Hine's Tunes (France's Concert, 1987)
- Gene Krupa, Charlie Ventura, Town Hall Concert Vol. 2 (London, 1974)
- Carmen McRae, Sessions, Live (Calliope, 1976)
- Red Nichols, Sessions, Live (Calliope, 1976)
- Ben Webster, Ben and the Boys (Jazz Archives, 1976)
- Dave Soldier, Vipers at the Onyx, Stuff Smith's Unfinished Violin Concerto, with violinist Curtis Stewart and the Prague Filmharmonic conducted by Adam Klemens (Bright Shiny Things, 2026)
