= I Love You, Paris =

Live album by Shirley Horn
- Released: 1994
- Recorded: Théâtre du Châtelet, Paris, France, March 7, 1992
- Genre: Vocal jazz
- Length: 1:14:22
- Label: Verve
- Producer: Shirley Horn, Sheila Mathis, Richard Seidel

Shirley Horn chronology
Light out of Darkness (1993)	I Love You, Paris (1994)	The Main Ingredient (1996)

I Love You, Paris is a 1992 live album by Shirley Horn, recorded at the Théâtre du Châtelet in Paris.

== Reception ==
Professional ratings
Review scores
Source	Rating
Allmusic	4/5 stars
The Penguin Guide to Jazz Recordings	3/4 stars

The Allmusic review by Richard S. Ginell stated: "Horn is in peak form throughout this program, often sounding exquisite and using silence and pauses quite expertly...Highly recommended".

I Love You, Paris was nominated for Best Jazz Vocal Performance in the 37th Annual Grammy Awards.

== Track listing ==
1. "Wouldn't It Be Loverly" (Alan Jay Lerner, Frederick Loewe) – 6:23
2. "Just in Time" (Jule Styne, Betty Comden, Adolph Green) – 3:13
3. "He Was Too Good to Me" (Lorenz Hart, Richard Rodgers) – 4:51
4. "Do It Again" (Buddy DeSylva, George Gershwin) – 8:17
5. "Old Country" (Curtis Reginald Lewis, Nat Adderley) – 5:37
6. "It's Easy to Remember (And So Hard to Forget)" (Hart, Rodgers) – 6:39
7. "All Through the Night" (Cole Porter) – 2:32
8. "L.A. Breakdown" (Larry B. Marks) – 6:47
9. "I Loves You Porgy / Here Comes de Honey Man" (G. Gershwin, I. Gershwin, DuBose Heyward) – 9:45
10. "A Song for You / Goodbye" (Leon Russell)/(Gordon Jenkins) – 12:54
11. "That Old Devil Called Love" (Doris Fisher, Allan Roberts) – 7:33

== Personnel ==
Musicians

- Shirley Horn – piano, vocals
- Charles Ables – bass guitar
- Steve Williams – drums, percussion

Production

- Shirley Horn – producer
- Jean-Philippe Allard – recording coordinator
- Margery Greenspan – art direction, artwork
- Pier Alessandri – assistant engineer
- Suzanne Dyer
- Richard Parsons
- Rene Weis
- Sheila Mathis – associate producer
- Alain Cluzeau – engineer
- Richard Seidel – executive producer
- Daniel Vong – illustrations
- Joel E. Siegel – liner notes, producer
- Dan Kincaid – mastering
- Dave Baker – mixing
- Alexis Gargarino – photography
- Nate Herr – product manager
