= I Thought About You (Shirley Horn album) =

Live album by Shirley Horn
- Released: 1987
- Recorded: May 12–13, 1987, Vine St. Bar and Grill, Hollywood
- Genre: Vocal jazz
- Length: 52:54
- Label: Verve

Shirley Horn chronology
Softly (1987)	I Thought About You (1987)	Close Enough for Love (1989)

I Thought About You is a 1987 live album by Shirley Horn, her first album for Verve Records.

== Reception ==
Professional ratings
Review scores
Source	Rating
Allmusic	4.5/5 stars
The Penguin Guide to Jazz Recordings	3/4 stars

In the opinion of Allmusic reviewer Scott Yanow: "This live set...was Shirley Horn's 'comeback' album after many years in which she purposely maintained a low profile as she raised her daughter. Typical of Horn's music ever since, she sings intimate ballads with her trio...and plays very effective piano behind her vocals".

== Track listing ==
1. "Something Happens to Me" (Marvin Fisher, Jack Segal) – 3:41
2. "The Eagle and Me" (Harold Arlen, E. Y. Harburg) – 3:10
3. "I Got It Bad (and That Ain't Good)" (Duke Ellington, Paul Francis Webster) – 4:58
4. "Love Is Here to Stay" (George Gershwin, Ira Gershwin) – 3:33
5. "Isn't It Romantic?" (Richard Rodgers, Lorenz Hart) – 6:02
6. "Estate (Summer)" (Bruno Brighetti, Bruno Martino, Joel E. Siegel) – 7:42
7. "Nice 'n' Easy" (Lew Spence, Alan Bergman, Marilyn Bergman) – 4:54
8. "I Thought About You" (Jimmy Van Heusen, Johnny Mercer) – 5:59
9. "The Great City" (Curtis Reginald Lewis) – 2:52
10. "I Wish I Didn't Love You So" (Frank Loesser) – 5:26
11. "Corcovado (Quiet Nights of Quiet Stars)" (Antonio Carlos Jobim, Gene Lees) – 11:56

== Personnel ==
Performance

- Shirley Horn – piano, vocals
- Charles Ables – bass guitar
- Steve Williams – drums

Production

- Ellie Hughes – art direction, design
- Tom Hughes
- Nick Dofflemeyer – assistant engineer
- Richard Seidel – consultant
- Larry Walsh – editing
- David Kreisberg – engineer, producer
- Ron Berinstein – executive producer
- Sherry Rayn Barnett – photography
- Miriam Cutler & Swing Street – producer
