= The Main Ingredient (disambiguation) =

The Main Ingredient is an American soul and R&B group.

The Main Ingredient may also refer to:

- The Main Ingredient (Pete Rock & CL Smooth album), 1994
- The Main Ingredient (Shirley Horn album), 1995
- "The Main Ingredient" (Luke Cage), an episode of Luke Cage
