= Embers and Ashes =

Studio album by Shirley Horn
- Released: 1960
- Genre: Vocal jazz
- Length: 52:54
- Label: Stere-O-Craft
- Producer: Buddy Smith

Shirley Horn chronology
Embers and Ashes (1960)	Shirley Horn Live at the Village Vanguard (1961)

Singles from Embers and Ashes
- 1. "Wild Is the Wind"

Professional ratings
Review scores
Source	Rating
AllMusic	3/5 stars
Encyclopedia of Popular Music	3/5 stars
The Virgin Encyclopedia of Jazz	3/5 stars

Embers and Ashes is the debut studio album by jazz vocalist and pianist Shirley Horn, released in 1960 by Stere-O-Craft Records.

In the same year, the album fell into the hands of trumpeter Miles Davis, who invited Horn to perform with him at the Village Vanguard jazz club, setting the club's management a condition: either he would perform with Horn, or he would not at all. After the performance, Horn was noticed and offered to sign a contract by representatives of Mercury Records.

== Track listing ==
Side A
No.	Title	Writer(s)	Length
1.	"Like Someone in Love"	Jimmy Van Heusen; Johnny Burke	2:27
2.	"He Never Mentioned Love"	Curtis Reginald Lewis	3:59
3.	"Softly, as in a Morning Sunrise"	Sigmund Romberg; Oscar Hammerstein II	3:21
4.	"I Thought About You"	Van Heusen; Johnny Mercer	2:58
5.	"Mountain Greenery"	Richard Rodgers; Lorenz Hart	2:11
6.	"God Bless the Child"	Arthur Herzog, Jr.; Billie Holiday	3:35

Side B
No.	Title	Writer(s)	Length
1.	"Blue City"	Lewis	3:30
2.	"Day by Day"	Axel Stordahl; Paul Weston; Sammy Cahn	2:30
3.	"If I Should Lose You"	Leo Robin; Ralph Rainger	3:15
4.	"Wild Is the Wind"	Dmitri Tiomkin; Ned Washington	3:37
5.	"Come Rain or Come Shine"	Harold Arlen; Mercer
6.	"Just in Time"	Jule Styne; Betty Comden; Adolph Green	2:05

== Personnel ==
- Shirley Horn – vocals, piano
- Joe Benjamin – double bass
- Lewis Packer - double bass on "Day by Day"
- Herbie Lovelle – drums
- Harry T. "Stump" Saunders - drums on "Day by Day"
