= Cat on a Hot Fiddle =

Studio album by Stuff Smith
- Released: 1960
- Recorded: August 7, 1959, Edgewood Recording Studios, Washington D.C.
- Genre: Jazz
- Length: 44:42
- Label: Verve
- Producer: Norman Granz

Stuff Smith chronology
Sweet Swingin' Stuff (1959)	Cat on a Hot Fiddle (1960)	Live at the Montmartre (1965)

Professional ratings
Review scores
Source	Rating
Allmusic	4/5 stars
The Penguin Guide to Jazz Recordings	3/4 stars
Tom Hull	B+

Cat on a Hot Fiddle is a 1960 studio album by Stuff Smith. This album featured the recording debut of Shirley Horn.

== Track listing ==
1. "Undecided" (Sid Robins, Charlie Shavers) – 2:41
2. "The Man I Love" (George Gershwin, Ira Gershwin) – 3:45
3. "Oh, Lady Be Good!" (G. Gershwin, I. Gershwin) – 2:21
4. "Nice Work if You Can Get It" (G. Gershwin, I. Gershwin) – 4:06
5. "Take the "A" Train" (Billy Strayhorn) – 4:13
6. "Blue Violin" (Andy Razaf, Stuff Smith) – 3:06
7. "They Can't Take That Away from Me" (G. Gershwin, I. Gershwin) – 5:09
8. "Somebody Loves Me" (Buddy DeSylva, G. Gershwin, Ballard MacDonald) – 3:42
9. "'S Wonderful" (G. Gershwin, I. Gershwin) – 3:45
10. "Nice and Warm" (Smith) – 3:17
11. "Strike Up the Band" (G. Gershwin, I. Gershwin) – 2:52

== Personnel ==
- Stuff Smith - violin, vocals
- Shirley Horn - piano
- Paul "Scooby" Smith
- Red Mitchell - double bass
- Sid Bulkin - drums
- Harry Saunders
