= Shirley Horn with Horns =

1963 studio album by Shirley Horn

Studio album by Shirley Horn
- Released: 1963
- Recorded: December 15–16, 1963, A&R Studios, New York City
- Genre: Vocal jazz
- Length: 52:54
- Label: Mercury; SR 60835
- Producer: Quincy Jones

Shirley Horn chronology
Loads of Love (1963)	Shirley Horn with Horns (1963)	Travelin' Light (1965)

Shirley Horn with Horns is a 1963 studio album by Shirley Horn, featuring arrangements by Quincy Jones, Billy Byers, Thad Jones and Don Sebesky.

== Reception ==
Professional ratings
Review scores
Source	Rating
AllMusic	3/5 stars

The AllMusic review by Scott Yanow awarded the album three stars and said that "...Horn does not play piano at all, sticking exclusively to vocals, and she had less control over the interpretations (being persuaded to sing some songs at faster-than-usual tempos) than she would later on...although the overall music is enjoyable, Horn would have much preferred to be the pianist behind her own vocals".

== Track listing ==
1. "On the Street Where You Live" (Alan Jay Lerner, Frederick Loewe) – 2:15
2. "The Great City" (Curtis Reginald Lewis) – 2:02
3. "That Old Black Magic" (Harold Arlen, Johnny Mercer) – 2:33
4. "Mack the Knife" (Marc Blitzstein, Bertolt Brecht, Kurt Weill) – 3:00
5. "Come Dance with Me" (Sammy Cahn, Jimmy Van Heusen) – 2:13
6. "Let Me Love You" (Bart Howard) – 3:04
7. "After You've Gone" (Henry Creamer, Turner Layton) – 2:59
8. "Wouldn't It Be Loverly" (Lerner, Loewe) – 3:39
9. "Go Away Little Boy" (Gerry Goffin, Carole King) – 3:26
10. "I'm in the Mood for Love" (Dorothy Fields, Jimmy McHugh) – 2:47
11. "The Good Life" (Sacha Distel, Jack Reardon) – 3:14
12. "In the Wee Small Hours of the Morning" (Bob Hilliard, David Mann) – 3:20

== Personnel ==
- Shirley Horn – vocals
- Four trumpets
- Jimmy Cleveland – trombone
- Three trombones
- Four French horns
- Jimmy Jones – piano
- Bobby Scott
- Quincy Jones – arranger (tracks 4, 8), conductor
- Billy Byers – arranger (tracks 1, 6–7, 10–12)
- Thad Jones – arranger (tracks 2, 5)
- Don Sebesky – arranger (tracks 3, 9)
