= You Won't Forget Me (album) =

Studio album by Shirley Horn
- Released: 1991
- Recorded: June 12, August 13, 1990
- Genre: Vocal jazz
- Length: 71:11
- Label: Verve
- Producer: Richard Seidel, Joel E. Siegel

Shirley Horn chronology
| Close Enough for Love (1988) | You Won't Forget Me (1991) | Here's to Life (1994) |

Professional ratings
Review scores
| Source | Rating |
|---|---|
| The Penguin Guide to Jazz Recordings | 3.5/4 stars |

You Won't Forget Me is a 1991 studio album by Shirley Horn.

Miles Davis made his last appearance as a sideman on this album.

You Won't Forget Me was the first jazz number 1 album in Horn's career.

== Track listing ==
1. "The Music That Makes Me Dance" (Bob Merrill, Jule Styne) - 6:32
2. "Come Dance with Me" (Sammy Cahn, Jimmy Van Heusen) - 2:47
3. "Don't Let the Sun Catch You Cryin'" (Joe Greene) - 5:58
4. "Beautiful Love" (Haven Gillespie, Wayne King, Egbert Van Alstyne, Victor Young) - 3:38
5. "Come Back to Me" (Burton Lane, Alan Jay Lerner) - 3:43
6. "Too Late Now" (Burton Lane, Alan Jay Lerner) - 6:00
7. "I Just Found Out About Love" (Harold Adamson, Jimmy McHugh) - 2:24
8. "It Had to Be You" (Isham Jones, Gus Kahn) - 6:49
9. "Soothe Me" (Greene) - 3:31
10. "Foolin' Myself" (Jack Lawrence, Peter Tinturin) - 2:46
11. "If You Go" (Michel Emer, Geoff Parsons) - 8:57
12. "You Stepped Out of a Dream" (Nacio Herb Brown, Gus Kahn) - 3:44
13. "You Won't Forget Me" (Kermit Goell, Fred Spielman) - 7:12
14. "All My Tomorrows" (Sammy Cahn, Jimmy Van Heusen) - 6:22

== Personnel ==
Musicians

- Shirley Horn - piano, vocals, arranger
- Charles Ables - bass guitar (tracks 1–3,6–8,11,13–14), guitar (track 12)
- Steve Williams - drums (tracks 1–3,6–8,11,13–14)
- Buster Williams - bass (tracks 5,10,12)
- Billy Hart - drums (tracks 5,10,12)
- Toots Thielemans - guitar (track 4), harmonica (tracks 4,9)
- Wynton Marsalis - trumpet (track 3)
- Branford Marsalis - tenor saxophone (track 8)
- Buck Hill - tenor saxophone (track 10)
- Miles Davis - trumpet (track 13)

Production

- Richard Seidel - producer
- The Bays - art direction
- Alli - art direction, design
- Joe Martin - assistant engineer
- Julio Peña
- Dave Baker - engineer, mixing
- Stanley Crouch - liner notes
- Bob Ludwig - mastering
- Frank Ockenfels - photography
- Joel E. Siegel
- Pierre M. Sprey - technical assistance
