= You're My Thrill (Shirley Horn album) =

Studio album by Shirley Horn
- Released: March 13, 2001
- Recorded: 2001?
- Genre: Jazz
- Length: 37:45
- Label: Verve
- Producer: Johnny Mandel, Tommy LiPuma

Shirley Horn chronology
I Remember Miles (1998)	You're My Thrill (2001)	May the Music Never End (2003)

You're My Thrill is a 2001 studio album by Shirley Horn, arranged by Johnny Mandel.

== Reception ==
Professional ratings
Review scores
Source	Rating
Allmusic	4/5 stars
The Penguin Guide to Jazz Recordings	3.5/4 stars

The Allmusic review by Richard S. Ginell stated: "Mandel's orchestrations are paragons of subtlety, sometimes creeping almost imperceptibly like a slow moving fog upon Horn's trio. Like his singer, Mandel respects the value of silence and space; they're a well matched pair, their different ideas of timing dovetail together neatly. Though some of us would have wanted Horn and her jazzmen to stretch out more on the small group tracks, they do serve effectively as breathers, or intermezzos, in between the languorous collaborations with Mandel".

== Track listing ==
1. "You're My Thrill" (Jay Gorney, Sidney Clare) – 4:45
2. "The Best Is Yet to Come" (Cy Coleman, Carolyn Leigh) – 2:37
3. "Solitary Moon" (Marilyn Bergman, Alan Bergman, Johnny Mandel) – 5:06
4. "Sharing the Night with the Blues" (Emmanuel Logan) – 3:00
5. "I Got Lost in His Arms" (Irving Berlin) – 4:52
6. "The Rules of the Road" (Coleman, Leigh) – 3:37
7. "My Heart Stood Still" (Lorenz Hart, Richard Rodgers) – 4:39
8. "You'd Better Love Me (While You May)" (Timothy Gray, Hugh Martin) – 1:58
9. "The Very Thought of You" (Ray Noble) – 5:14
10. "Why Don't You Do Right?" (Kansas Joe McCoy) – 2:45
11. "All Night Long" (Shirley Horn, Curtis Reginald Lewis) – 7:44

== Personnel ==
=== Performance ===
- Shirley Horn – piano, vocals
- Charles Ables – double bass
- Brian Bromberg – bass (track 2,4,6,8,10)
- Chuck Domanico – bass (track 3)
- Steve Schaeffer – drums (track 3)
- Steve Williams – drums, percussion
- Dori Caymmi – guitar (track 3)
- Russell Malone – guitar
- Alan Broadbent – piano (track 3)
- Carl Saunders – trumpet
- Larry Bunker – vibraphone
- Johnny Mandel – arranger, conductor, producer
