= Where Are You Going (album) =

Studio album by Shirley Horn
- Released: 1973
- Genre: Jazz
- Label: Perception PLP 31
- Producer: Boo Frazier

Shirley Horn chronology
Travelin' Light (1965)	Where Are You Going (1973)	A Lazy Afternoon (1978)

Where Are You Going is a 1973 album by Shirley Horn.

The album was reissued with Dizzy Gillespie's 1969 album The Real Thing on CD in 1996. Billboard magazine featured the album as a "Radio Action and Pick LP" in their February 17, 1973 issue.

== Track listing ==
1. "Where Are You Going" – 4:19
2. "Something Happens to Me" (Marvin Fisher, Jack Segal) – 2:11
3. "Come on Home" – 2:23
4. "Do It Again" (Buddy DeSylva, George Gershwin) – 7:02
5. "The Eagle and Me" (Harold Arlen, E.Y. "Yip" Harburg) – 2:50
6. "Taste of Honey" (Bobby Scott, Ric Marlow) – 5:39
7. "L.A. Breakdown" (Larry Marks) – 4:48
8. "Consequences of a Drug Addict Role" (Shirley Horn) – 6:00

== Personnel ==
- Shirley Horn – piano, vocals
- Al Gafa – guitar
- Marshall T. Harris – double bass
- Bernard Sweetney – drums
- Boo Frazier – producer
