= Close Enough for Love (Andy Williams album) =

Studio album by Andy Williams
- Released: 1986
- Recorded: September 22–24, 1986
- Studio: AIR Recording Studios, London
- Genre: Vocal pop; Traditional pop
- Length: 44:10
- Label: Atco
- Producer: Jeremy Lubbock

Andy Williams chronology
Greatest Love Classics (1984)	Close Enough for Love (1986)	I Still Believe in Santa Claus (1990)

Close Enough for Love is the thirty-ninth studio album by American pop singer Andy Williams, released in 1986 by Atco Records. Williams writes in the liner notes: "This is essentially a ‘live’ album. Our objective was to get real performances from both the orchestra and myself, as opposed to the sometimes sterile perfection of countless overdubs and tracking sessions. To my amazement, we used the first takes on most of the songs. The excitement of first hearing Jeremy's arrangements affected me so, that I found a quality in my singing that wasn't there in later takes."

The phrase "Romantic Music from the Movies" on the back of the CD booklet conveys the theme of the album, with half of the songs dating from the decade previous to its release and the other half going back to the era of traditional pop. Williams even updates the title songs from two of his albums, "Moon River" and "Days of Wine and Roses", with what, for 1986, were very modern adult contemporary arrangements. The one selection that didn't originate on the big screen was the 1944 jazz standard "'Round Midnight", which had recently been part of the soundtrack of the film of the same name.

Williams told an interviewer at the time that he was excited the album was being released by Atco. "It's a label for rock 'n' rollers, but they're very excited about the album. They're going to promote it like they promote Twisted Sister," Williams said. "They think I can have a hit."

== Reception ==
Professional ratings
Review scores
Source	Rating
The Encyclopedia of Popular Music	3/5 stars

Billboard described the album as "a little perspective", and noted "it reprised two of his big hits".

== Track listing ==
=== Side one ===
1. "How Do You Keep the Music Playing?" from Best Friends (Alan Bergman, Marilyn Bergman, Michel Legrand) - 4:36
2. "Moon River" from Breakfast at Tiffany's (Henry Mancini, Johnny Mercer) - 4:10
3. "Change Partners" from Carefree (Irving Berlin) - 4:06
4. "Lucky to Be Me" from On the Town (Betty Comden, Adolph Green) - 4:04
5. "My Funny Valentine" from Babes in Arms (Lorenz Hart, Richard Rodgers) - 3:56

=== Side two ===
1. "Days of Wine and Roses" from Days of Wine and Roses (Henry Mancini, Johnny Mercer) - 4:14
2. "Through the Eyes of Love" from Ice Castles (Marvin Hamlisch, Carole Bayer Sager) - 4:46
3. "Close Enough for Love" from Agatha (Johnny Mandel, Paul Williams) - 3:46
4. "The Music of Goodbye" from Out of Africa (John Barry, Alan Bergman, Marilyn Bergman) - 4:32
5. "'Round Midnight" (Bernie Hanighen, Thelonious Monk, Cootie Williams) - 5:44

== Personnel ==
Adapted from the liner notes.

Musicians

- Trevor Bastow - keyboards
- Nigel Black - French horn
- Jeffrey Bryant - French horn
- John Chambers - percussion
- Harry Fisher - drums
- Tristan Fry - percussion
- Paul Hart - keyboards
- Chris Karan - drums, percussion
- Duncan Lamont - tenor sax solos
- Jeremy Lubbock - keyboards ("How Do You Keep the Music Playing?", "Moon River", "My Funny Valentine", "'Round Midnight")
- Andy MacIntosh - alto sax solos
- Mike Moran - keyboards
- John Pigneguy - French horn
- Frank Ricotti - percussion
- Ray Russell - electric guitar
- Paul Westwood - bass
- Sean Whittle - keyboards
- Andy Williams - vocals

=== Production ===
- Jeremy Lubbock - producer, arranger (with acknowledgments), conductor (except as noted)
- John Lubbock - conductor ("How Do You Keep the Music Playing?", "Moon River", "'Round Midnight")
- David Foster - arranger acknowledgment ("How Do You Keep the Music Playing?")
- Larry Williams - arranger acknowledgment ("The Music of Goodbye")
- Johnny Mandel - arranger acknowledgment ("Close Enough for Love")
- John Arrias - engineer, mixer
- Aaron Denson - assistant engineer
- John Powell - assistant engineer
- Steve Jackson - assistant engineer
- Matt Howe - mixing assistant
- Barry Diament - CD mastering
- Bernie Grundman - LP mastering
- George Hamer - contractor
- Jack Rothstein - concertmaster
- Kenneth Sillito - concertmaster
- Richard Studt - concertmaster
- Aaron Rapoport - cover photo
- Bob Defrin - art direction
