= I Thought About You =

1939 song by Jimmy Van Heusen and Johnny Mercer

"I Thought About You" is a 1939 popular song composed by Jimmy Van Heusen with lyrics by Johnny Mercer.

== Background ==
It was one of three collaborations Van Heusen and Mercer wrote for the Mercer-Morris publishing company started by Mercer and former Warner Bros. publisher Buddy Morris. The other two were called "Blue Rain" and "Make with the Kisses". "I Thought About You" was by far the most popular of the songs.

The lyrics were inspired by Mercer's train trip to Chicago. The first line is: "I took a trip on a train." Mercer said about the song:

"I can remember the afternoon that we wrote it. He [Van Heusen] played me the melody. I didn't have any idea, but I had to go to Chicago that night. I think I was on the Benny Goodman program. And I got to thinking about it on the train. I was awake, I couldn't sleep. The tune was running through my mind, and that's when I wrote the song. On the train, really going to Chicago."

Mercer wrote other songs about trains, including "Blues in the Night" (1940) and "On the Atchison, Topeka and the Santa Fe" (1946).

== Recordings ==
- Bob Berg – In the Shadows
- Kenny Burrell with Coleman Hawkins – Bluesy Burrell (1962)
- Uri Caine – Live at the Village Vanguard (2003)
- Miles Davis – Someday My Prince Will Come (1961)
- Stan Getz with Kenny Barron – Voyage
- Benny Goodman with Mildred Bailey – 1939
- Johnny Hartman - And I Thought About You (1959)
- Billie Holiday with Bobby Tucker – Recital (1954)
- Shirley Horn - I Thought About You (1987)
- Branford Marsalis with Kenny Kirkland – Random Abstract
- Carmen McRae – The Great American Songbook (1972)
- Diane Schuur and Johnny Smith
- Frank Sinatra – Songs for Swingin' Lovers! (1956)
- Mel Tormé and Cleo Laine - Nothing Without You (1992)
- David Bowie – "I Took a Trip on a Gemini Spaceship" from Heathen (2002)
- Dinah Washington recorded the song for her 1959 album What a Diff'rence a Day Makes!
- Nancy Wilson – But Beautiful (1969)

== See also ==
- List of 1930s jazz standards
