= Carnival of Swing =

The Carnival of Swing was a music festival that took place on 29 May 1938 on Randall's Island, New York. It is considered the first outdoor jazz festival. Performing at the concert were twenty-five swing bands, including the Duke Ellington and Count Basie orchestras, and Stuff Smith. Though newsreel footage of the event exists, no audio recordings were thought to have survived until radio recordings known as the Savory Collection were acquired by the National Jazz Museum in Harlem.

The event reportedly lasted five hours and forty-five minutes. It was attended by "23,400 assorted jitterbugs and alligators - more conservatively known as swing music enthusiasts". Lines of police and park officers were in place to protect the musicians from over-enthusiastic fans.
