= Day Dream =

Jazz standard written in 1939

Song
- Written: 1939
- Published: 1941 by Robbins Music
- Composer(s): Billy Strayhorn
- Lyricist(s): John Latouche

"Day Dream" is a jazz standard composed by Billy Strayhorn with lyrics by John Latouche and written in 1939. It was first recorded by saxophonist Johnny Hodges and his ensemble on November 2, 1940. Duke Ellington was credited as co-composer on the label of the original 78 RPM release, though he is not generally considered to be one of the song's creators.

== Background ==
On March 23, 1939, Duke Ellington and his orchestra boarded the SS Île de France for a spring tour of Europe. Strayhorn was working for Ellington at the time but was allowed to remain at his Harlem residence. Thus, he had nearly seven weeks to work on new compositions and arrangements. "Day Dream" was composed during this time.

== Notable recordings ==
=== By Johnny Hodges ===
- Day Dream / Junior Hop (Bluebird 11021, 1940)
- Memories Of Ellington (Norgran, 1954)
- Johnny Hodges with Billy Strayhorn and the Orchestra (Verve, 1962)

=== By Duke Ellington ===
- The Carnegie Hall Concerts: January 1943 (released 1977)
- Duke Ellington Presents... (1956), Duke Ellington's Jazz Violin Session (recorded 1963, released 1976)
- ...And His Mother Called Him Bill (1968)

=== By others ===
- Ella Fitzgerald – Ella Fitzgerald Sings the Duke Ellington Songbook (1957)
- Jo Stafford – Jo + Jazz (1960)
- Rita Moss – Daydream 7-inch EP (Rozell) (1959)
- Billy Strayhorn – The Peaceful Side (1961)
- Thad Jones – The Danish Radio Big Band and Eclipse (1978)
- Sarah Vaughan – The Duke Ellington Songbook, Vol. 1 (1979)
- Betty Carter – Feed the Fire (1993)
- June Christy – The Misty Miss Christy (1956), Day Dreams (1995)
- Chet Baker – Chet Baker Sings and Plays from the Film "Let's Get Lost" (1998)
