= Live at the 4 Queens =

Live album by Shirley Horn
- Released: September 16, 2016
- Recorded: May 2, 1988
- Venue: Four Queens Hotel, Las Vegas
- Genre: Jazz
- Length: 52:38
- Label: Resonance
- Producer: Zev Feldman

Shirley Horn chronology
The Swingin' Shirley Horn (2009)	Live at the 4 Queens (2016)	Shirley Horn with Friends (2018)

Professional ratings
Review scores
Source	Rating
All About Jazz	5/5 stars
The Guardian	4/5 stars

Live at the 4 Queens is a live album by American singer and pianist Shirley Horn. The album was recorded at the Four Queens Hotel in Las Vegas on May 2, 1988. In 2016, the album was released by Resonance Records. Also at the same time, a documentary film was released on the artist's life and career.

== Track listing ==
No.	Title	Writer(s)	Length
1.	"Hi-Fly"	Randy Weston	6:30
2.	"You'd Be So Nice to Come Home To"	Cole Porter	4:03
3.	"Meditation (Meditação)"	Norman Gimbel; Antônio Carlos Jobim; Newton Mendonça	9:12
4.	"The Boy from Ipanema"	Gimbel; Jobim; Mendonça	5:27
5.	"Isn't It Romantic?"	Lorenz Hart; Richard Rodgers	10:14
6.	"Lover Man (Oh, Where Can You Be?)"	Jimmy Davis; Roger Ramirez; James Sherman	5:28
7.	"Something Happens to Me"	Marvin Fisher; Jack Segal	3:23
8.	"Just for a Thrill"	Lil Hardin Armstrong; Don Raye	5:10
9.	"Blues for Big Scotia"	Oscar Peterson	3:11
Total length:			52:38

== Personnel ==
- Shirley Horn – piano, vocals
- Charles Ables – bass guitar
- Steve Williams – drums, percussion

== Charts ==
Chart performance for Live at the 4 Queens
Chart (2016)	Peak position
US Top Jazz Albums (Billboard)	20
US Top Traditional Jazz Albums (Billboard)	12
