= Day Dreams (June Christy album) =

Compilation album by June Christy
- Released: 2012
- Genre: Jazz
- Label: Capitol

June Christy chronology
Uncollected June Christy Volume Two (1987)	Day Dreams (2012)	Through the Years (1995)

Day Dreams is an album collecting examples of American jazz vocalist June Christy's 78-rpm and 45-rpm recordings from the 1940s and 1950s, mostly from her pre-Something Cool days.

== Track listing ==
1. "I Let a Song Go Out of My Heart" (Duke Ellington, Henry Nemo, John Redmond, Irving Mills) - 2:44
2. "If I Should Lose You" (Ralph Rainger, Leo Robin) - 2:45
3. "Day Dream" (Billy Strayhorn, Duke Ellington, John La Touche) - 2:44.
4. "Little Grass Shack" (Bill Cogswell, Tommy Harrison & Johnny Noble) - 3:03
5. "Skip Rope" (Sidney Lippman, Sylvia Dee) - 2:48
6. "I'll Bet You Do" (Lorenzo Pack) - 2:59
7. "The Way You Look Tonight" (Jerome Kern, Dorothy Fields) - 2:47
8. "Everything Happens to Me" (Matt Dennis, Tom Adair) - 3:00
9. "I'll Remember April" (Gene de Paul, Patricia Johnston, Don Raye) - 3:14
10. "Get Happy" (Harold Arlen, Ted Koehler) - 2:43
11. "Somewhere (If Not In Heaven)" (Kenny Burrell) - 3:06
12. "A Mile Down The Highway (There's A Toll Bridge)" (David Mann, Bob Hilliard) - 2:25
13. "Do It Again" (George Gershwin, Buddy DeSylva) - 2:54
14. "He Can Come Back Anytime He Wants To" (Johnny Lehman) - 2:51
15. "Body and Soul" (Johnny Green, Edward Heyman, Robert Sour, Frank Eyton) - 3:35
16. "You're Blasé" (Ord Hamilton, Bruce Sievier) - 3:39
- Tracks 1, 2 and 3 with Frank De Vol's Orchestra, recorded Los Angeles 3 March 1947, tracks 4, 5 and 6 recorded 31 March 1947.
- Tracks 7 and 8 with Bob Cooper's Orchestra, recorded Los Angeles 28 March 1949.
- Tracks 9, 10 and 11 with Pete Rugolo's Orchestra, recorded Los Angeles 29 September 1949.
- Tracks 12, 13 and 14 with Shorty Rogers and His Giants, recorded Los Angeles 11 September 1950
- Tracks 15 and 16 with Stan Kenton, piano, recorded Los Angeles 19 May 1955 (previously unissued).
