= All Night Long (Shirley Horn album) =

Live album by Shirley Horn
- Released: 1981
- Recorded: July 10–12, 1981
- Genre: Vocal jazz
- Length: 42:20
- Label: SteepleChase
- Producer: Nils Winther

Shirley Horn chronology
A Lazy Afternoon (1978)	All Night Long (1981)	Violets for Your Furs (1981)

Professional ratings
Review scores
Source	Rating
AllMusic	3/5 stars
The Penguin Guide to Jazz	3.5/4 stars

All Night Long is a 1981 album by Shirley Horn recorded at the North Sea Jazz Festival. All Night Long is a companion to Violets for Your Furs, which was also from the North Sea Jazz Festival in 1981. It was released by the Danish record label SteepleChase.

The album was recorded in July 1981. In addition to Horn on piano and vocals, the musicians are Charles Ables on bass, and Billy Hart on drums.

== Track listing ==
1. "You'd Be So Nice to Come Home To" (Cole Porter)- 3:35
2. "Someone Like That in Your Life" (Buck Hill, Dayon) - 4:15
3. "How Insensitive" (Antonio Carlos Jobim) - 7:50
4. "Good for Nothing Joe" (Rube Bloom, Ted Koehler) - 5:35
5. "Git Rid of Monday" (Jimmy Heath) - 4:05
6. "All Night Long" (Curtis Lewis) - 7:50
7. "If I Had You" (Ted Shapiro, Jimmy Campbell, Reg. Connelly) - 4:50
8. "Meditation" (Antonio Carlos Jobim) - 4:20
9. "When Your Lover Has Gone" (Einar A. Swan) - 3:12
10. "If Dreams Come True" (Benny Goodman, Irving Mills, Edgar Sampson) - 2:53

== Personnel ==
- Shirley Horn – vocals, piano
- Charles Ables – bass
- Billy Hart – drums
