= I Still Believe in Santa Claus =

Studio album by Andy Williams
- Released: 1990
- Recorded: 1990
- Genre: Christmas; traditional pop; vocal pop
- Length: 32:29
- Label: Curb
- Producer: Michael Lloyd

Andy Williams chronology
Close Enough for Love (1986)	I Still Believe in Santa Claus (1990)	Nashville (1991)

Professional ratings
Review scores
Source	Rating
Allmusic	3/5 stars

I Still Believe in Santa Claus is a Christmas album by American pop singer Andy Williams that was released by Curb Records in 1990. It was his fourth solo album of Christmas music, following The Andy Williams Christmas Album (1963), Merry Christmas (1965) and Christmas Present (1974). As with the 1965 LP, this album focuses exclusively on 20th-century compositions, including two new songs: "Christmas Needs Love to Be Christmas" and "My Christmas Vow (This Is My Promise)", the latter of which Williams describes in the liner notes as "a new lyric set to an old Hawaiian melody".

== Track listing ==
1. "Santa Claus Is Coming to Town" (J. Fred Coots, Haven Gillespie) – 3:21
2. "Christmas Needs Love to Be Christmas" (Tim James, Steven McClintock) – 3:05
3. "Blue Christmas" (Bill Hayes, Jay Johnson) – 3:09
4. "The Christmas Waltz" (Sammy Cahn, Jule Styne) – 2:26
5. "My Christmas Vow (This Is My Promise)" (Mack David, Charles E. King) – 2:18
6. "I Saw Mommy Kissing Santa Claus" (Tommie Connor) – 3:14
7. "I'll Be Home for Christmas" (Kim Gannon, Walter Kent, Buck Ram) – 3:02
8. "What Are You Doing New Year's Eve?" (Frank Loesser) – 3:42
9. Medley – 3:58
  a. "When You Wish upon a Star" from Pinocchio (Leigh Harline, Ned Washington)
  b. "Toyland" from Babes in Toyland (Victor Herbert, Glen MacDonough)
10. "Happy Christmas (War Is Over)" (John Lennon, Yoko Ono) – 4:14

== Song information ==
"Toyland" originated in the 1903 operetta Babes in Toyland. "Santa Claus Is Coming to Town" by George Hall & the Hotel Taft Orchestra with Sonny Schuyler on vocal is the only recording of the song to have charted in conjunction with its publication in 1934, reaching number 12. "When You Wish upon a Star" won the Academy Award for Best Original Song for its inclusion in the 1940 film Pinocchio and had separate renditions make the charts that same year by Cliff Edwards, Horace Heidt, Guy Lombardo, and Glenn Miller, and Bing Crosby's recording of "I'll Be Home for Christmas" spent two weeks at number three upon its first release in 1943.

In 1949, recordings of "Blue Christmas" by Russ Morgan, Ernest Tubb, and Hugo Winterhalter made the Billboard charts. That same year marked the first charting of "What Are You Doing New Year's Eve?", thanks to The Orioles. 1952 saw the release of "I Saw Mommy Kissing Santa Claus", with versions by Molly Bee, Jimmy Boyd, and Spike Jones all making the charts that holiday season. Frank Sinatra's recording of "The Christmas Waltz" was released in 1954, and John Lennon and Yoko Ono's "Happy Christmas (War Is Over)" first made Billboard's Christmas Singles chart in 1971.

== Personnel ==
Adapted from the album credits.

- Dennis Belfield - bass
- Stuart Blumberg - trumpet
- Ernie Carlson - trombone
- Dan Higgins - sax, clarinet and flute
- John Hobbs - piano
- Molly Jacman - background vocals
- Angie Jaree - background vocals
- Joey Johnson - background vocals
- Laurence Juber - guitar
- Peter Kent - string direction
- Paul Leim - drums
- Gail Levant - harp
- Michael Lloyd - percussion and synths
- Robert Martin - percussion and synths
- Cassie Miller - background vocals
- Amanda Williams - background vocals
- Andy Williams - vocals, background vocals
- Jason Williams - background vocals
- Richard B. Williams - background vocals

=== Production ===
- Michael Lloyd - producer, mixer
- Ken Thorne - arranger
- Dan Nebenzal - engineer, mixer
- John Valentino - assistant engineer
- Darryl Dobson - assistant mixer
- Craig Johnson - assistant mixer
- Don Griffin/West LA Music - recording musical instruments
- Debbie Lytton - production coordinator
- J. Katz Photography - photography
- Neuman, Walker & Associates - art direction/design

== Bibliography ==
- Whitburn, Joel (1986), Joel Whitburn's Pop Memories, 1890-1954, Record Research Inc., ISBN 0-89820-083-0
- Whitburn, Joel (2004), Christmas in the Charts (1920-2004), Record Research Inc., ISBN 0-89820-161-6
- Wiley, Mason; Bona, Damien (1996), Inside Oscar: The Unofficial History of the Academy Awards, Ballantine Books, ISBN 0-345-40053-4
