= Greatest Love Classics =

Studio album by Andy Williams
- Released: 1984
- Recorded: June 1984; July 1984; August 1984
- Studio: Abbey Road Studios & CBS Studios, London
- Genre: Classical
- Length: 45:45
- Label: EMI
- Producer: Nicky Graham; Tony Hiller

Andy Williams chronology
Let's Love While We Can (1980)	Greatest Love Classics (1984)	Close Enough for Love (1986)

Professional ratings
Review scores
Source	Rating
The Encyclopedia of Popular Music	3/5 stars

Greatest Love Classics is the thirty-eighth studio album by American pop singer Andy Williams, released in 1984 by EMI Records. Williams writes in the liner notes: "All through my life I have known and loved the great classic melodies and wished I could sing them. So when Tony Hiller and Nicky Graham contacted me with some of these melodies set to lyrics, they immediately caught my imagination."

Although the album did not make it onto the Billboard 200 chart in the US, it did enter the UK album chart on October 27, 1984, and reached #22 during its 10 weeks there. On November 12, 1984, it was awarded with Silver certification for sales of 60,000 units as well as Gold certification for sales of 100,000 units in the UK by the British Phonographic Industry.

== Track listing ==
All titles arranged and adapted by Tony Hiller & Nicky Graham; all lyrics by Hiller & Graham; original concept by Hiller.

=== Side one ===
1. "Romeo and Juliet" (based on Romeo and Juliet's fantasy overture by Tchaikovsky) - 3:36
2. "Love Made Me a Fool" (based on Rhapsody on a Theme of Paganini (opus 43) Variation 18 by Rachmaninoff) - 3:28
3. "Vino de Amor" (based on Romance Anonimo) - 3:35
4. "A Different Light" (based on "Barcarolle" by Tchaikovsky) - 3:55
5. "Another Winter's Day" (based on "Clair de lune" by Debussy) - 3:55
6. "The Vision" (based on "The Swan" from The Carnival of the Animals by Saint-Saëns) - 2:31
7. "Journey's End" (based on the Adagio of Spartacus and Phrygia from Spartacus by Khachaturian) - 3:28

=== Side two ===
1. "A Twist of Fate" (based on "Serenade" by Schubert) - 3:08
2. "Home" (based on Nocturne in E-flat major, Op. 9, No. 2 by Chopin) - 4:16
3. "Brave New World" (based on Sonata Pathétique by Beethoven) - 2:46
4. "She'll Never Know" (based on "Für Elise" by Beethoven) - 3:01
5. "In My World of Illusion" (based on "Poème" by Fibich) - 3:44
6. "Words" (based on "Ode to Joy" by Beethoven) - 4:31

== Personnel ==
From the liner notes for the original album:

- Andy Williams - vocals
- Nicky Graham - producer
- Tony Hiller - producer
- John Kurlander - engineer
- Steve Rooke - mastering
- Mike Ross - engineer
- Del Newman - orchestrations (except as noted)
- John Cameron - orchestrations ("Romeo and Juliet", "The Vision", "Brave New World", "Words")
- John Coleman - orchestration ("She'll Never Know")
- Brian Aris - cover photo
- Cream - design

=== Musicians ===
All tracks feature the Royal Philharmonic Orchestra led by Raymond Cohen except "Another Winter's Day" featuring Stuart Calvert on piano and "Vino de Amor" featuring Carmelo Luggeri and Terry Taylor on guitars. John McCarthy directed the Ambrosian Opera Chorus on "Words". Also featured on various tracks are:

- Geoffrey Eales - piano
- Herbie Flowers - bass
- Bob Jenkins - drums
- Felix Krish - bass
- Ian Lynn - piano
- Barry Morgan - drums
- Ronnie Price - piano
- Paul Westwood - bass
