= Sarah: Dedicated to You =

Studio album by Carmen McRae
- Released: 1991
- Recorded: 1991
- Studio: Clinton Recording Studio, New York City
- Genre: Vocal jazz
- Length: 56:27
- Label: Novus
- Producer: Larry Clothier

Carmen McRae chronology
Carmen Sings Monk (1988)	Sarah: Dedicated to You (1991)

Sarah: Dedicated to You is a 1991 studio album by Carmen McRae, with the Shirley Horn trio. The album was recorded in tribute to McRae's friend and fellow jazz singer Sarah Vaughan, and was McRae's last recording.

== Reception ==
Professional ratings
Review scores
Source	Rating
AllMusic	4.5/5 stars

The AllMusic review by John Bush says

“McRae brings back the spirit (and some of the phrasing) of Sarah Vaughan while still sounding very much like herself. This very well-conceived tribute is a classic of its kind and a perfect swan song for Carmen McRae.”

== Track listing ==
1. "Poor Butterfly" (John Golden, John Raymond Hubbell) - 3:58
2. "I've Got the World on a String" (Harold Arlen, Ted Koehler) - 3:25
3. "Misty" (Johnny Burke, Erroll Garner) - 4:10
4. "Wonder Why" (Nicholas Brodszky, Sammy Cahn) - 2:46
5. "Send in the Clowns" (Stephen Sondheim) - 3:51
6. "Black Coffee" (Sonny Burke, Paul Francis Webster) - 6:21
7. "Tenderly" (Walter Gross, Jack Lawrence) - 5:22
8. "The Best Is Yet to Come" (Cy Coleman, Carolyn Leigh) - 2:30
9. "I Will Say Goodbye" (Eddie Bacri, Michel Legrand, Alan and Marilyn Bergman) - 2:38
10. "The Lamp Is Low" (Mitchell Parish, Peter De Rose, Maurice Ravel) - 3:02
11. "It's Magic" (Sammy Cahn, Jule Styne) - 4:58
12. "Dedicated to You" (Cahn, Saul Chaplin, Hy Zaret) - 6:02
13. "I'll Be Seeing You" (Sammy Fain, Irving Kahal) - 4:54
14. "Sarah" (Carroll Coates) - 3:49

Bonus tracks on 2003 compact disc release

13. "If You Could See Me Now" (Tad Dameron, Carl Sigman) - 4:59
14. "Wave" (Antonio Carlos Jobim) - 4:04
15. "Embraceable You" (George Gershwin, Ira Gershwin) - 7:41
16. "Sarah" (Alternate Lyric) - 3:36

== Personnel ==
- Carmen McRae - vocals

The Shirley Horn trio

- Shirley Horn - piano
- Charles Ables - electric bass
- Steve Williams - drums
