= You're My Thrill (song) =

1933 popular song

Song
- Released: 1933
- Composer: Jay Gorney
- Lyricist: Sidney Clare

"You're My Thrill" is a 1933 popular song, composed by Jay Gorney, with lyrics by Sidney Clare. It was introduced in the film Jimmy and Sally (1933).

== Recorded versions ==
- Ward Silloway (1933)
- Al Bowlly with Lew Stone and His Band (1934)
- Lena Horne with Charlie Barnet and his Orchestra (1941)
- Mary Ann McCall with orchestra directed by Phil Moore (1948)
- Doris Day with John Rarig & Orchestra for her album You're My Thrill (1949).
- Billie Holiday (1950)
- Julie London arranged and conducted by Russ Garcia – Make Love to Me (1956)
- Peggy Lee – Black Coffee (1956),Moments Like This (1993)
- Kenny Drew – This Is New (1957)
- Harry James – arranged by J. Hill – Harry's Choice (1958) (Capitol Records – ST 1093)
- Pepper Adams – 10 to 4 at the 5 Spot (1958)
- Marti Barris (1959)
- Max Roach with Abbey Lincoln (1959) (on The Complete Mercury Max Roach Plus Four Sessions, released 2000)
- Ella Fitzgerald – Clap Hands, Here Comes Charlie! (1961)
- Nat "King" Cole – recorded on November 12, 1958 and later released on a compilation album. The Unforgettable Nat King Cole Sings the Great Songs (1966).
- Abbey Lincoln – Talking to the Sun (1983)
- Chet Baker – Baker's Holiday (1965)
- Chet Baker – Chet Baker Sings and Plays from the Film Let's Get Lost (1988)
- Shirley Horn – Softly (1988), You're My Thrill (2001)
- Maria Muldaur – Jazzabelle (1995)
- The Blackeyed Susans - Spin the Bottle (1997)
- Robert Palmer with orchestra arranged and conducted by Clare Fischer – Don't Explain (1990)(reissued in 1992 on Ridin' High)
- Joni Mitchell – Both Sides Now (2000)
- Jeremy Steig – Flute on the Edge (2005)
- Amel Larrieux – Lovely Standards (2007)
- Holly Cole – Holly Cole (2007)
- Diana Krall – Quiet Nights (2009)
- Fourplay with Anita Baker – Let's Touch the Sky (2010)
- Anjulie (2011)
- Sylvia Brooks – Restless (2012)
- Jamala – The Guide (2014)
- Cécile McLorin Salvant — Dreams and Daggers (2017)
