= Jeffery Smith (musician) =

American singer

- Born: 14 September 1955
- Died: September 2012 (aged 56–57)
- Genres: Jazz
- Occupation: Musician
- Instrument: Singing
- Label: Verve Records
- Formerly of: Claude Bolling Big Band

Jeffery Smith (14 September 1955 – 2012) was a baritone jazz vocal recording artist, perhaps best known for his albums on Verve, among them his distinctive debut release produced by Shirley Horn, and his self-produced records, including Down Here Below and A Little Sweeter, which was praised in a full page review in TIME as being "the most vital album of the year".

Jeffery Smith's musical career included two world tours and four albums with the Claude Bolling Big Band, performances at Jazz at Lincoln Center with Wynton Marsalis and the Jazz at Lincoln Center Orchestra, in tribute to Louis Armstrong, and collaborations with a wide variety of artists including Dianne Reeves, Kenny Barron, Regina Carter, Joe Lovano, Dee Dee Bridgewater and TK Blue. Smith was also the founder and director of Tri-Loxodonta Productions, a not-for-profit music organization cultivating jazz in upstate New York.

At age 17 moved from New York to San Diego where he spent fifteen years. He worked in theater and television at the time. He moved back to New York in 1983 He moved to Paris, France in September 1991 wanting to change his life.

== Discography ==
- Ramona with Shirley Horn (Gitane/Verve, 1995)
- A Little Sweeter (Verve, 1997)
- Down Here Below (Verve, 1999)
