= May the Music Never End =

Studio album by Shirley Horn
- Released: June 24, 2003
- Recorded: February 3–5, 2003
- Genre: Jazz
- Label: Verve
- Producer: Shirley Horn

Shirley Horn chronology
You're My Thrill (2001)	May the Music Never End (2003)

May the Music Never End is a 2003 studio album by Shirley Horn, it was Horn's last studio album.

== Reception ==
Professional ratings
Review scores
Source	Rating
Allmusic	4/5 stars
The Penguin Guide to Jazz Recordings	4/4 stars

The Allmusic review by Tim Sendra commented: "Horn's trademark sound is the sparse, languid torch song, with atmospheric piano chords and her gentle and soulful vocals caressing the notes as she slowly lets them ease into the listener's ear. ..If it is indeed her swan song, then she went out the same way she came in: as a true classic". At the time of the album's recording, Horn had stopped playing piano for health-related reasons, and George Mesterhazy played piano on most of the album's tracks. Ahmad Jamal played piano on two tracks, "Maybe September" and "This Is All I Ask". Horn was able to resume playing the piano in public performances in 2004, and her final recordings, made in January 2005 at Au Bar in New York City, feature Horn accompanying herself at the piano.

== Track listing ==
1. "Forget Me" (Valerie Parks Brown) – 3:30
2. "If You Go Away" (Jacques Brel, Rod McKuen) – 4:49
3. "Yesterday" (John Lennon, Paul McCartney) – 4:14
4. "Take Love Easy" (Duke Ellington, John Latouche) – 5:12
5. "Never Let Me Go" (Ray Evans, Jay Livingston) – 5:17
6. "Watch What Happens" (Norman Gimbel, Michel Legrand) – 3:29
7. "Ill Wind" (Harold Arlen, Ted Koehler) – 7:09
8. "Maybe September" (Evans, Percy Faith, Livingston) – 7:10
9. "Everything Must Change" (Bernard Ighner) – 5:01
10. "This Is All I Ask" (Gordon Jenkins) – 6:43
11. "May the Music Never End" (Artie Butler, Norman Martin) – 5:07

== Personnel ==
- Shirley Horn – vocals
- Roy Hargrove – trumpet on "Take Love Easy" and "Ill Wind"
- Ed Howard – double bass
- Ahmad Jamal – piano on "Maybe September" and "This Is All I Ask"
- George Mesterhazy – piano, arrangements
- Steve Williams – drums
