= The Garden of the Blues =

Live album by Shirley Horn Trio
- Released: 1985
- Recorded: November 16, 1984
- Venue: Florida Memorial College, Miami, FL
- Genre: Jazz
- Length: 36:36
- Label: SteepleChase SCS 1203
- Producer: Nils Winther

Shirley Horn chronology
Violets for Your Furs (1981)	The Garden of the Blues (1985)	All of Me (1986)

The Garden of the Blues is a live album by jazz vocalist/pianist Shirley Horn, performing the compositions of Curtis Lewis, which was recorded in Florida in 1984 and released on the Danish SteepleChase label.

== Reception ==
Professional ratings
Review scores
Source	Rating
AllMusic	4/5 stars
The Penguin Guide to Jazz Recordings	3/4 stars

In his review for AllMusic, Ken Dryden commented: "Horn is in top form throughout the concert, with her soft, thoughtful vocals accompanied by her sensitive and sometimes swinging piano".

== Track listing ==
All compositions by Curtis Lewis except where noted

1. Introduction – 0:24
2. "He's Gone Again" (Curtis Lewis, Curley Hamner, Gladys Hampton) – 6:10
3. "Old Country" (Lewis, Nat Adderley) – 4:59
4. "Roaming Lover" – 5:19
5. "The Garden of the Blues Suite: Blue City" – 5:48
6. "The Garden of the Blues Suite: What Would a Woman Do?" – 4:48
7. "The Garden of the Blues Suite: He Never Mentioned Love" – 6:57
8. "The Garden of the Blues Suite: The Great City" – 3:56

== Personnel ==
- Shirley Horn – vocals, piano
- Charles Ables – electric bass
- Steve Williams – drums
