= Loving You (Shirley Horn album) =

Studio album by Shirley Horn
- Released: 1997
- Recorded: 1997
- Genre: Jazz
- Length: 53:27
- Label: Verve 314 537 022-2
- Producer: Jean-Philippe Allard, Richard Seidel, Shirley Horn

Shirley Horn chronology
The Main Ingredient (1996)	Loving You (1997)	I Remember Miles (1998)

Loving You is a 1997 album by the jazz pianist and singer Shirley Horn.

The album peaked at 4 on the Billboard Top Jazz Albums chart.

== Reception ==
Professional ratings
Review scores
Source	Rating
Allmusic	2.5/5 stars
The Penguin Guide to Jazz Recordings	3.5/4 stars

Scott Yanow reviewed the album for Allmusic and wrote: "De-emphasizing her piano, Horn sings one very slow ballad after another. The intimate music...has very little variety and should be listened to in small doses. Horn's singing is full of subtle emotion and sensuality...but no real surprises occur and the consistently dreamy mood has the potential to become quite sleepy".

== Track listing ==
1. "Loving You" (Artie Butler, Norman Martin) – 4:21
2. "The Man You Were" (Albert Van Dam, Martin Hall) – 4:11
3. "Dreamy" (Erroll Garner, Sydney Shaw) – 4:03
4. "Someone to Light up My Life" (Antônio Carlos Jobim, Gene Lees, Vinícius de Moraes) – 4:36
5. "In the Dark" (Lil Green) – 5:17
6. "Should I Surrender (Adam Ross, William Landau, Douglas E. Powell, Shirley Horn" – 4:06
7. "Love Dance" (Ivan Lins, Vítor Martins, Paul Williams) – 5:36
8. "Kiss and Run" (Rene Denoncin, William Engvick, Jack Ledru) – 4:48
9. "The Island" (Alan and Marilyn Bergman, Lins, Martins) – 7:55
10. "It Amazes Me" (Cy Coleman, Carolyn Leigh) – 2:36
11. "(All of a Sudden) My Heart Sings" (Harold Rome, Jean Marie Blanvillain, Henry Herpin) – 5:58

== Personnel ==
- Shirley Horn – piano, vocals
- Alex Acuña – percussion
- George Mesterhazy – guitar, keyboards, piano, MIDI orchestrations
- Steve Novosel – double bass
- Steve Williams, Terrence "Bearwolf" Williams – drums
