= Violets for Your Furs (album) =

Live album by Shirley Horn
- Released: 1981
- Recorded: July 10–12, 1981
- Genre: Vocal jazz
- Length: 45:59
- Label: SteepleChase
- Producer: Scott Winther

Shirley Horn chronology
All Night Long (1981)	Violets for Your Furs (1981)	The Garden of the Blues (1984)

Violets for Your Furs is a 1981 live album by Shirley Horn recorded at the North Sea Jazz Festival.

== Reception ==
Professional ratings
Review scores
Source	Rating
AllMusic	4/5 stars

The AllMusic review by Scott Yanow stated: "This lesser-known set is up to the same level as Shirley Horn's best-selling Verve sets. Recommended."

== Track listing ==
1. "Love Is Here to Stay" (George Gershwin, Ira Gershwin) - 3:27
2. "Georgia on My Mind" (Hoagy Carmichael, Stuart Gorrell) - 7:25
3. "Gee, Baby, Ain't I Good to You" (Andy Razaf, Don Redman) - 3:40
4. "Lover Man (Oh, Where Can You Be?)" (Jimmy Davis, Roger ("Ram") Ramirez, James Sherman) - 5:18
5. "Violets for Your Furs" (Tom Adair, Matt Dennis) - 4:56
6. "Baby Won't You Please Come Home" (Charles Warfield, Clarence Williams) - 4:14
7. "My Man" (Jacques Charles, Channing Pollack, Albert Willemetz, Maurice Yvain) - 10:16
8. "More Than You Know" (Edward Eliscu, Billy Rose, Vincent Youmans) - 4:18
9. "I Didn't Know What Time It Was" (Lorenz Hart, Richard Rodgers) - 2:25

== Personnel ==
- Shirley Horn - piano, vocals
- Charles Ables - electric bass
- Billy Hart - drums
