= Light Out of Darkness (A Tribute to Ray Charles) =

Studio album by Shirley Horn
- Released: 1993
- Recorded: April 30 and May 1–3, 1993
- Studio: Clinton Recording Studios, New York City
- Genre: Vocal jazz
- Length: 62:53
- Label: Verve
- Producer: Shirley Horn, Sheila Mathis, Richard Seidel, Lynn Butterer

Shirley Horn chronology
Here's to Life (1992)	Light Out of Darkness (A Tribute to Ray Charles) (1993)	I Love You, Paris (1994)

Light Out of Darkness (A Tribute to Ray Charles) is a 1993 studio album by Shirley Horn, recorded in tribute to Ray Charles.

== Reception ==
Professional ratings
Review scores
Source	Rating
AllMusic	4/5 stars
The Penguin Guide to Jazz Recordings	3.5/4 stars

According to the AllMusic review by Scott Yanow: "Horn sounds nothing like Charles, but she sometimes captures his spirit...While emphasizing ballads, as one always expects, this is a fun set that includes more medium-tempo tunes than usual for a Shirley Horn set".

== Track listing ==
1. "Hit the Road Jack" (Percy Mayfield) – 3:11
2. "Just a Little Lovin'" (Eddy Arnold, Zeke Clements) – 4:07
3. "You Don't Know Me" (Arnold, Cindy Walker) – 2:58
4. "Drown in My Own Tears" (Henry Glover) – 5:04
5. "Hard Hearted Hannah" (Milton Ager, Charles Bates, Bob Bigelow, Jack Yellen) – 3:36
6. "Georgia on My Mind" (Hoagy Carmichael, Stuart Gorrell) – 5:20
7. "Makin' Whoopee" (Walter Donaldson, Gus Kahn) – 3:54
8. "Bein' Green" (Joe Raposo) – 3:16
9. "Bye Bye Love" (Felice and Boudleaux Bryant) – 5:26
10. "The Sun Died" (Ray Charles, Hubert Giraud, Anne Gregory, Pierre Delanoë) – 5:39
11. "How Long Has This Been Going On?" (George Gershwin, Ira Gershwin) – 4:01
12. "If You Were Mine" (James Lewis) – 3:25
13. "I Got a Man" (Charles, Renald Richard) – 3:25
14. "Just for a Thrill" (Lil Armstrong, Don Raye) – 4:25
15. "Light Out of Darkness" (Charles, Rick Ward) – 5:25

== Personnel ==
Performance

- Shirley Horn – piano, vocals, producer
- Gary Bartz – alto saxophone
- Charles Ables – guitar, electric bass
- Tyler Mitchell – double bass
- Steve Williams – drums
- The Hornettes – vocal ("Hit the Road Jack")

Production

- Dave Baker – engineer, mixing
- Lynn Butterer – assistant producer, post production assistant, pre-production assistant
- Suzanne Dyer – assistant engineer
- Robert Friedrich – assistant engineer
- Nate Herr – production coordination
- Jimmy Katz – photography
- Dan Kincaid – mastering
- Michael Klotz – design
- Sheila Mathis – production coordination
- Richard Seidel – executive producer
- Camille Tominaro – project coordinator
