= I Remember Miles (Shirley Horn album) =

Studio album by Shirley Horn
- Released: June 9, 1998
- Recorded: December 5–7, 1997
- Genre: Vocal jazz
- Length: 52:54
- Label: Verve
- Producer: Shirley Horn, Richard Seidel, Sheila Mathis

Shirley Horn chronology
Loving You (1997)	I Remember Miles (1998)	You're My Thrill (2001)

I Remember Miles is a 1998 studio album by Shirley Horn, recorded in tribute to Miles Davis. The album cover illustration was a drawing Davis had once done of them both.

Horn's performance on this album won her the Grammy Award for Best Jazz Vocal Performance at the 41st Grammy Awards.

== Reception ==
Professional ratings
Review scores
Source	Rating
AllMusic	3/5 stars
The Penguin Guide to Jazz Recordings	3.4/4 stars

The AllMusic review by Richard S. Ginell stated: "Horn's understated, laconic, deceptively casual ballad manner is a natural fit for the brooding Miles persona, and she doesn't have to change a thing in this relaxed, wistfully sung, solidly played collection...In a sad way, the very idea of a Miles tribute is an oxymoronic denial of the ever-restless spirit of this genius who didn't believe in looking backwards. But Shirley Horn certainly serves the man's sensitive side well".

== Track listing ==
1. "My Funny Valentine" (Lorenz Hart, Richard Rodgers) – 5:33
2. "I Fall in Love Too Easily" (Sammy Cahn, Jule Styne) – 5:39
3. "Summertime" (George Gershwin, Ira Gershwin, DuBose Heyward) – 4:59
4. "Baby Won't You Please Come Home" (Charles Warfield, Clarence Williams) – 7:21
5. "This Hotel" (Johnny Keating, Richard Quine) – 3:37
6. "I Got Plenty o' Nuttin'" (Gershwin, Gershwin, Heyward) – 3:39
7. "Basin Street Blues" (Williams) – 5:28
8. "My Man's Gone Now" (Gershwin, Gershwin, Heyward) – 10:39
9. "Blue in Green" (Miles Davis, Bill Evans, Al Jarreau) – 5:59

== Personnel ==
Performers

- Shirley Horn – piano, vocals, producer
- Ron Carter – bass guitar
- Roy Hargrove – flugelhorn, trumpet
- Toots Thielemans – harmonica
- Buck Hill – tenor saxophone
- Charles Ables – double bass
- Steve Williams – drums, percussion
- Al Foster

Production

- Chika Azuma – artwork, design
- Sheila Mathis – assistant producer
- Dave Baker – engineer, mixing
- Ira Gitler – liner notes
- Duncan Stanbury – mastering
- Richard Seidel – producer
- Camille Tominaro – production coordination
