= National Jazz Museum in Harlem =

Museum in New York City

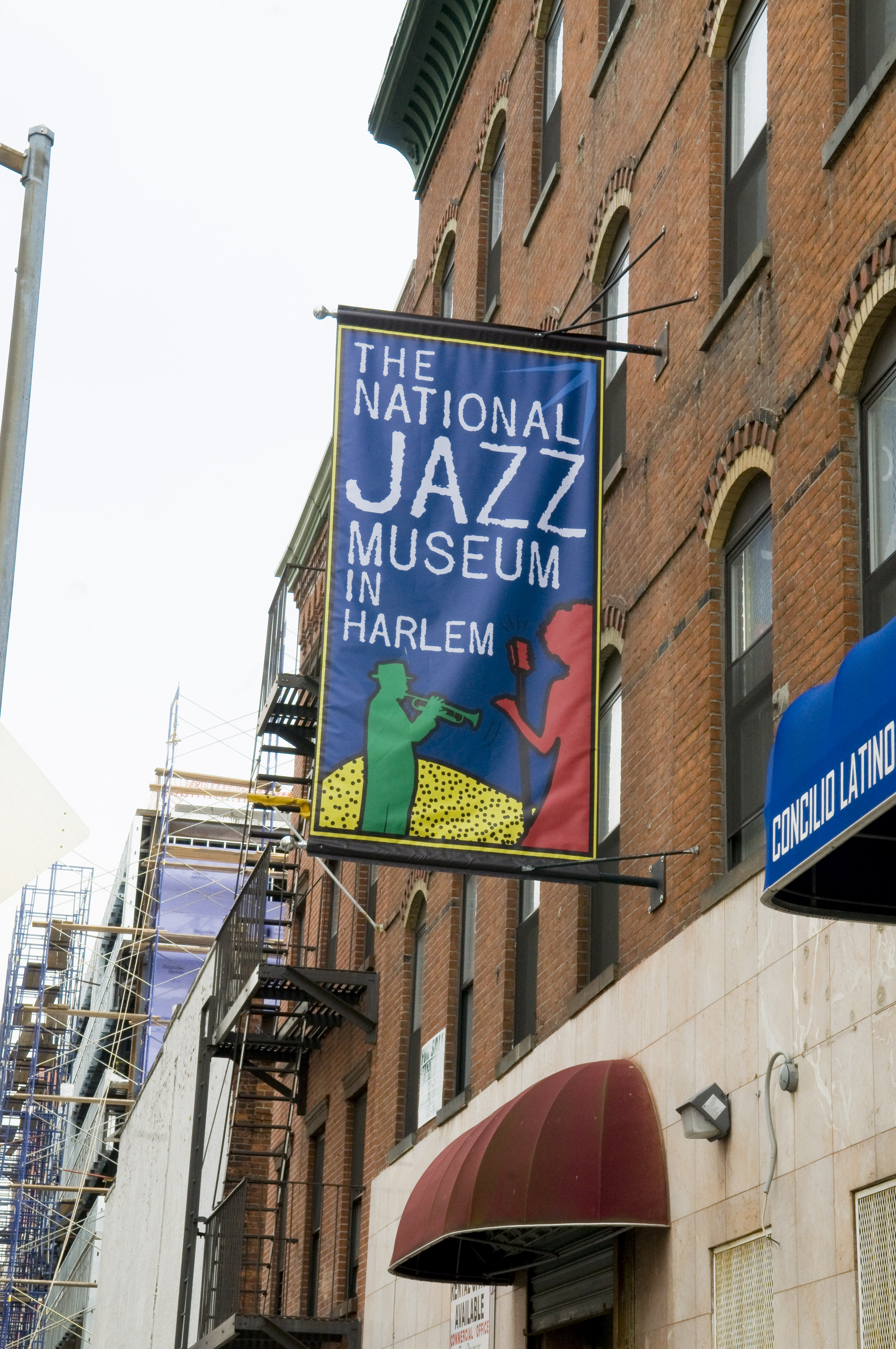
- Established: 1996
- Location: 58 West 129th Street; Manhattan, NY 10027
- Coordinates: 40.8055°N 73.9380°W
- Directors: Executive Director Tracy Hyter-Suffern, Artistic Directors Jonathan Batiste and Christian McBride
- Public transit access: Subway: at 125th Street; Bus: Bx15, M1, M7, M60, M100, M101, M102
- Website: www.jazzmuseuminharlem.org

The National Jazz Museum in Harlem is dedicated to preservation and celebration of the jazz history, culture and music of Harlem, Manhattan, New York City. The museum was founded in 1996 by Leonard Garment, then Counsel to two U.S. presidents and an accomplished jazz saxophonist, Abraham David Sofaer, former U.S. district judge who gave the initial gift in honor of his brother-in-law Richard J. Scheuer, Jr., and matching funds from the Upper Manhattan Empowerment Zone, Harlem Community Development Corporation. For more than 15 years, the museum was in East Harlem at 104 East 126th Street.

On February 1, 2016, the museum re-opened in a new space at 58 West 129th Street in Central Harlem with approximately 1900 square feet of exhibition space.

== Programs and exhibits ==
The National Jazz Museum in Harlem's Visitors Center has featured exhibits such as The Ghosts of Harlem by American music producer, photographer and author Hank O'Neal. The exhibit included images of Harlem jazz legends that O'Neal had the chance to interview and photograph for his book of the same name. The museum also houses books, recordings, and documentaries for guests to enjoy as well as changing Artist is Residence exhibits that feature local artists from various creative genres who are inspired by jazz.

The museum hosts program events such as the Harlem Speaks lecture series and Jazz for Curious Listeners sessions in which jazz novices and experts listen and learn about rare jazz recordings. The museum partners with other museums such as the International Salsa Museum, community organizations and businesses to host events at jazz venues, galleries and other spaces easily accessible by the public. -->

Multi-Grammy winner, bassist, bandleader and composer Christian McBride is the founding artistic director of the museum and has influenced programming since 2002. They span and synthesize straight-ahead, experimental, free-leaning jazz, funk, soul, Latin, hip hop and rhythm and blues. His celebrated groups include Inside Straight, The Christian McBride Big Band, The Christian McBride Trio, Christian McBride’s New Jawn, and A Christian McBride Situation.

Multi-Grammy winner, Bandleader, multi-instrumentalist, songwriter and composer Jon Batiste has worked with the museum since 2008 when he helped create Jazz Is: Now! with which his Stay Human band played and "he deconstructed jazz, walking people through the theory and history of the music, often with the help of guests." Batiste was named associate artistic director of the museum in 2012.

== The Savory Collection ==
In August 2010, the National Jazz Museum in Harlem acquired nearly 1,000 discs of recorded radio broadcasts made by audio engineer William Savory in the midst of the swing era in the 1930s. The collection includes performances by best selling jazz artists Louis Armstrong, Billie Holiday, and Benny Goodman. Savory had access to bigger, slower-playing aluminum and acetate records and he was able to record much longer clips, capturing extended live shows and jam sessions that many thought would be lost forever. The recordings were digitized by Brooklyn-based recording engineer Doug Pomeroy, a specialist in audio restoration. The transformation involved cleaning, correcting pitch, removing extraneous noise, mixing and mastering. The Savory Collection was being made available for purchase for a limited time. Portions of the collection are available for digital download through iTunes. As of December 2017 four volumes are available. In 2022, Mosaic Records released a limited-edition 6-CD set with selections from the collection.

== See also ==
- List of music museums
