= Loads of Love =

Studio album by Shirley Horn
- Released: 1963
- Recorded: September 13 & 15, 1962, New York City
- Genre: Vocal jazz
- Length: 52:54
- Label: Mercury

Shirley Horn chronology
| Shirley Horn live at the Village Vanguard (1961) | Loads of Love (1963) | Shirley Horn with Horns (1963) |

Loads of Love is a 1963 jazz studio album by Shirley Horn, arranged by Jimmy Jones. Prestigious musicians collaborated on the album, including Gerry Mulligan, Kenny Burrell, Al Cohn, and Hank Jones.

== Reception ==
Professional ratings
Review scores
| Source | Rating |
|---|---|
| AllMusic | 3/5 stars |

The Allmusic review by Scott Yanow awarded the album three stars and said: "...Horn does not play piano at all, sticking exclusively to vocals, and she had less control over the interpretations (being persuaded to sing some songs at faster-than-usual tempos) than she would later on...although the overall music is enjoyable, Horn would have much preferred to be the pianist behind her own vocals."

== Track listing ==
1. "Wild Is Love" (Raymond Rasch, Dorothy Wayne) – 1:48
2. "Loads of Love" (Richard Rodgers) – 2:27
3. "My Future Just Passed" (George Marion, Jr., Richard Whiting) – 2:44
4. "There's a Boat Dat's Leavin' Soon for New York" (George Gershwin, Ira Gershwin, DuBose Heyward) – 2:45
5. "Ten Cents a Dance" (Lorenz Hart, Rodgers) – 4:27
6. "Only the Lonely" (Sammy Cahn, Jimmy Van Heusen) – 3:09
7. "The Second Time Around" (Cahn, Van Heusen) – 3:15
8. "Do It Again" (Buddy DeSylva, George Gershwin) – 2:57
9. "It's Love" (Leonard Bernstein, Betty Comden, Adolph Green) – 2:05
10. "That's No Joke" (Joe Bailey) – 2:41
11. "Love for Sale" (Cole Porter) – 3:52
12. "Who Am I?" (Jule Styne, George Brown, Walter Bullock) – 2:50

== Personnel ==
- Shirley Horn – vocals
- Jerome Richardson – flute, woodwind
- Frank Wess – flute, tenor saxophone
- Al Cohn – tenor saxophone
- Gerry Mulligan – baritone saxophone
- Joe Newman – trumpet
- Ernie Royal
- Kenny Burrell – guitar
- Hank Jones – piano
- Jimmy Jones – piano, arranger, conductor
- Milt Hinton – double bass
- Osie Johnson – drums
- Gene Orloff – violin
