= Here's to Life =

Studio album by Shirley Horn
- Released: 1992
- Recorded: September 1991
- Genre: Vocal jazz
- Label: Verve
- Producer: Johnny Mandel

Shirley Horn chronology
You Won't Forget Me (1991)	Here's to Life (1992)	Light Out of Darkness (A Tribute to Ray Charles) (1992)

Professional ratings
Review scores
Source	Rating
Allmusic	2.5/5 stars
The Penguin Guide to Jazz Recordings	3/4 stars

Here's to Life is a 1992 studio album by Shirley Horn, arranged by Johnny Mandel (also the composer of three of the songs on the album), who received a Grammy Award for Best Instrumental Arrangement Accompanying Vocal(s) on this album.

The title track "Here's to Life" became Horn's signature song. The music was written by Artie Butler and the poignant lyrics were written by Phyllis Molinary. The lyric is known, world-wide, as one of her finest works and the song is considered a "modern day jazz standard."

"If You Love Me" is her interpretation of the passionate "Hymne à l'amour", made famous by Edith Piaf.

"Summer" is the first English version of the Italian standard "Estate". Horn ordered English lyrics after hearing Joao Gilberto's version, which spread the song's worldwide fame.

== Track listing ==
1. "Here's to Life" (Artie Butler, Phyllis Molinary) – 5:37
2. "Come a Little Closer"/"Wild Is the Wind" (John Wallowitch)/(Dimitri Tiomkin, Ned Washington) – 7:27
3. "How Am I to Know?" (Jack King, Dorothy Parker) – 3:23
4. "A Time for Love" (Johnny Mandel, Paul Francis Webster) – 6:45
5. "Where Do You Start?" (Alan Bergman, Marilyn Bergman, Johnny Mandel) – 4:36
6. "You're Nearer" (Lorenz Hart, Richard Rodgers) – 3:32
7. "Return to Paradise" (Tiomkin, Washington) – 5:09
8. "Isn't It a Pity?" (George Gershwin, Ira Gershwin) – 5:47
9. "Quietly There" (Morgan Ames, Johnny Mandel) – 6:09
10. "If You Love Me" (Marguerite Monnot, Geoff Parsons) – 6:02
11. "Summer (Estaté)" (Bruno Brighetti, Bruno Martino, Joel E. Siegel) – 7:38

== Personnel ==
- Shirley Horn – vocals, piano
- Charles Ables – bass
- Steve Williams - drums
- Johnny Mandel - arranger, conductor
- Wynton Marsalis - trumpet (tracks 4 & 9)
- Richard Todd, French horn, (track 1)
