= William Savory =

British-American audio engineer (1916–2004)

William Alcott Savory (June 11, 1916 – February 11, 2004) was an audio engineer known for his extensive private recordings of important jazz musicians in the 1930s, and for his contributions to recording technology. A musician who developed an interest in sound engineering, Savory began building his own recording devices in the mid-1930s. Savory was involved with the team led by Columbia Records engineer William S. Bachman that succeeded in bringing the first 33⅓ rpm long-playing record albums to market in 1948.

== Biography ==
Savory was born William Alcott Savory of French and Italian parents aboard the ocean liner Mauretania. He played the piano and the saxophone. He grew up in New Jersey and Southern California. He was married to Helen Ward, a former singer in Benny Goodman's band.

Savory specialized in transcribing live performances off the air for radio networks and advertisers, and recorded a large number of radio broadcasts which featured American jazz musicians, classical musicians, and spoken word broadcasts in the 1930s. The radio recordings of the live broadcasts, made before the introduction of tape, were known to only a handful of people until they were acquired by the National Jazz Museum in Harlem in 2010. They were recorded on 12- or 16-inch discs, made of raw aluminum or lacquer coated aluminum (incorrectly called "acetates"). Because they were recorded at speeds of 33⅓ rpm, Savory was able to record longer performances than were previously available on 10-inch 78 rpm shellac discs, which could capture only about three minutes of music.

A master of the art of disc cutting, Savory made the first transfers from disk to tape to LP master. Among these were the on-site recordings of Benny Goodman's historic January 16, 1938 concert at Carnegie Hall in New York City, which has been described by critic Bruce Eder as "the single most important jazz or popular music concert in history." He also developed the technique for cutting the masters of 78 rpm recordings that were being transferred to the new format.

During World War II, Savory was assigned to the Naval Research Laboratory, helped to develop radar for all-weather fighter aircraft, and served as a test and combat pilot. Savory later worked as a defense contractor in the Washington, D.C., area, on electronic communications and surveillance devices designed to pick up audio and data signals. According to his son, Eugene Desavouret, Savory was “a spook" (agent), connected with the CIA."

The National Jazz Museum has begun digitizing recordings of performances by Louis Armstrong, Benny Goodman, Billie Holiday, Count Basie, Coleman Hawkins, Lester Young, Bunny Berigan, Harry James and many others. However, the copyright status of the collection is unclear because there was no arrangement for distribution of copies in contracts between performers and radio stations in the 1930s, according to June M. Besek, executive director of the Kernochan Center for Law, Media and the Arts at the Columbia University School of Law.
