= Close Enough for Love (Shirley Horn album) =

Studio album by Shirley Horn
- Released: 1989
- Recorded: November 14–16, 1988 A&R Recording, New York City
- Genre: Vocal jazz
- Length: 52:54
- Label: Verve
- Producer: Ron Berinstein, Richard Seidel

Shirley Horn chronology
I Thought About You (1987)	Close Enough for Love (1989)	You Won't Forget Me (1991)

Close Enough for Love is a 1989 studio album by Shirley Horn. It was her second album on the Verve Records label.

== Reception ==
Professional ratings
Review scores
Source	Rating
Allmusic	4.5/5 stars
The Penguin Guide to Jazz Recordings	3.5/4 stars

In his review for Allmusic, Scott Yanow wrote: "Performing with her usual trio...and guest tenor Buck Hill on five of the 13 tracks, Horn is heard in definitive form throughout these studio sessions."

== Track listing ==
1. "A Beautiful Friendship" (Donald Kahn, Stanley Styne) – 3:42
2. "I Got Lost in His Arms" (Irving Berlin) – 4:15
3. "Baby, Baby All the Time" (Bobby Troup) – 2:40
4. "Close Enough for Love" (Johnny Mandel, Paul Williams) – 4:44
5. "This Can't Be Love" (Lorenz Hart, Richard Rodgers) – 2:45
6. "I Wanna Be Loved" (Johnny Green, Edward Heyman, Billy Rose) – 4:29
7. "Come Fly with Me" (Sammy Cahn, Jimmy Van Heusen) – 4:00
8. "Once I Loved (O Amor en Paz)" (Vinícius de Moraes, Ray Gilbert, Antonio Carlos Jobim) – 6:50
9. "But Beautiful" (Johnny Burke, Van Heusen) – 4:32
10. "Get Out of Town" (Cole Porter) – 2:42
11. "Memories of You" (Eubie Blake, Andy Razaf) – 7:23
12. "It Could Happen to You" (Burke, Van Heusen) – 2:48
13. "So I Love You" (Carroll Coates) – 3:15

== Personnel ==
Performance

- Shirley Horn – piano, vocals
- Buck Hill – tenor saxophone (tracks 1, 6–7, 11–12)
- Charles Ables – bass guitar
- Steve Williams – drums, percussion

Production

- Seth Rothstein – production manager
- Mitchell Kanner – art direction
- Blaise Sires – assistant engineer
- Dave Baker – engineer
- Ron Berinstein – executive producer
- Joel E. Siegel – liner notes
- Joe Brescio – mastering
- David Conrad – photography
- Jeffrey Krein
- Richard Seidel – producer
- Pierre M. Sprey – technical assistance
