= A Lazy Afternoon (Shirley Horn album) =

Studio album by Shirley Horn Trio
- Released: 1979
- Recorded: July 9, 1978
- Genre: Jazz
- Length: 42:27
- Label: SteepleChase SCS 1111
- Producer: Nils Winther

Shirley Horn chronology
Where Are You Going (1972)	A Lazy Afternoon (1979)	All Night Long (1981)

A Lazy Afternoon is a studio album by jazz vocalist/pianist Shirley Horn, which was recorded in 1978 and released on the Danish SteepleChase label.

== Reception ==
Professional ratings
Review scores
Source	Rating
AllMusic	3.5/5 stars
The Penguin Guide to Jazz Recordings	3.5/4 stars

In his review for AllMusic, Ken Dryden called it "a fine studio set" additionally commenting: "An always effective vocalist who provided her own top-notch accompaniment on piano, Horn's almost conversational style of singing works very well whether she is swinging an oldie like 'I'm Old Fashioned' or delivering a lush, infectious interpretation of a ballad like 'A Lazy Afternoon'."

== Track listing ==
1. "I'm Old Fashioned" (Jerome Kern, Johnny Mercer) – 2:43
2. "There's No You" (Hal Hopper, Tom Adair) – 6:14
3. "New York's My Home" (Gordon Jenkins) – 2:46
4. "Why Did I Choose You?" (Michael Leonard, Herbert Martin) – 6:13
5. "Take a Little Time to Smile" (Dave Barbour, Peggy Lee) – 2:59
6. "A Lazy Afternoon" (Jerome Moross, John La Touche) – 4:52
7. "The Gentle Rain" (Luiz Bonfá, Matt Dubey) – 9:56
8. "Gra'ma's Hands" (Bill Withers) – 3:10
9. "I'll Go My Way by Myself" (Arthur Schwartz, Howard Dietz) – 3:17

== Personnel ==
- Shirley Horn – vocals, piano
- Buster Williams – bass
- Billy Hart – drums
