= Close Enough for Love (song) =

"Close Enough for Love" was the theme song from the 1979 film Agatha starring Dustin Hoffman and Vanessa Redgrave. The song has since become a jazz standard. The singer of the original version that ran to the end credits of the film was Patti Brooks. It was composed by Johnny Mandel with lyrics by Paul Williams.

It was the title song on albums by Peggy Lee in 1979 and Andy Williams in 1986. Other notable recordings of the song are by Tony Bennett, Stan Getz, Monty Alexander, Lena Horne, Shirley Horn, Dianne Reeves and Marian McPartland.

== See also ==
- List of jazz standards
