= Do It Again (George Gershwin and Buddy DeSylva song) =

1922 popular song

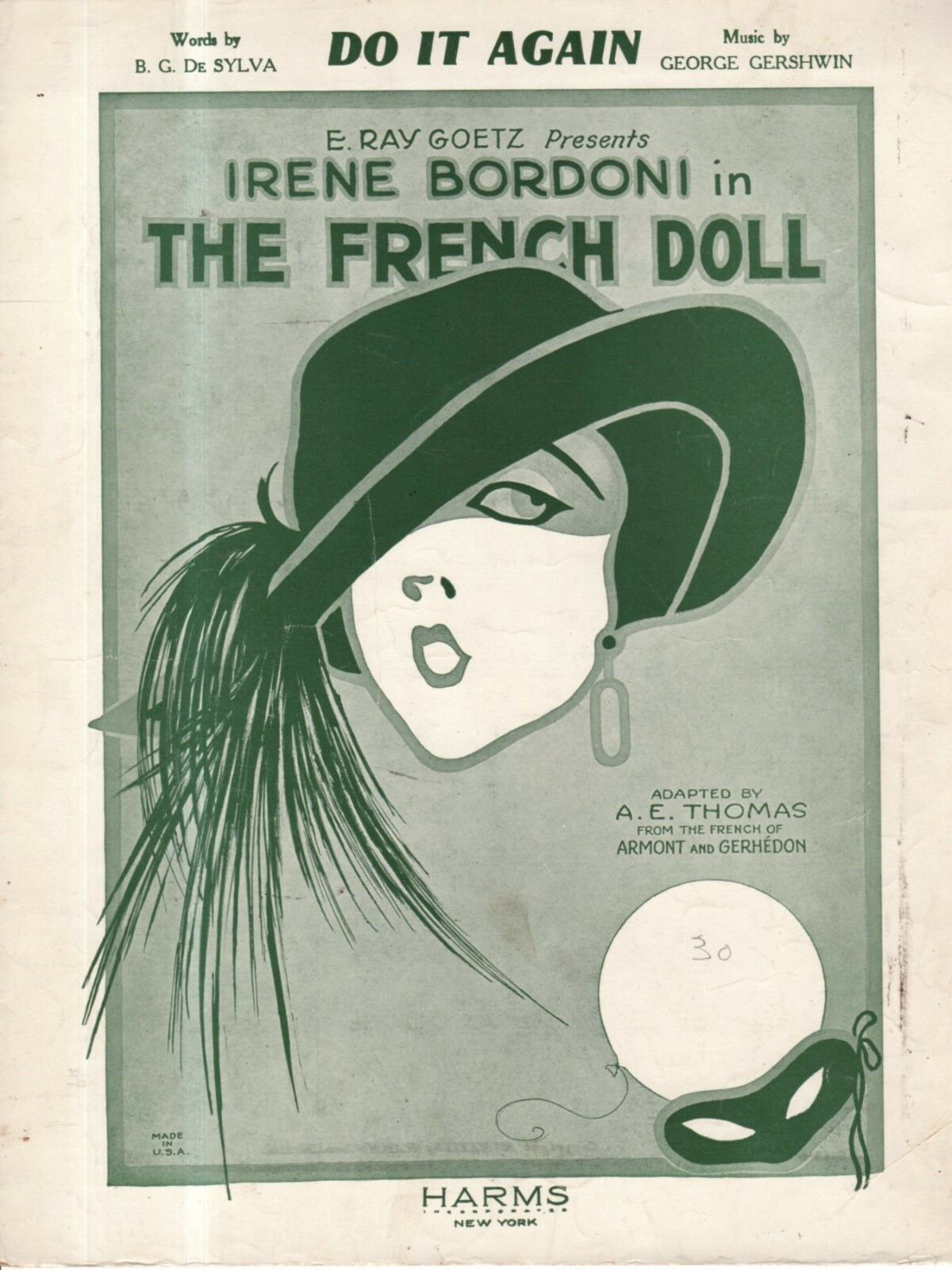

Song
- Language: English
- Composer: George Gershwin
- Lyricist: Buddy DeSylva

Audio sample
- Recording of Do It Again, performed by the Paul Whiteman Orchestra (1922): file; help

"Do It Again" is an American popular song by composer George Gershwin and lyricist Buddy DeSylva. The song premiered in the 1922 Broadway show The French Doll, as performed by actress Irène Bordoni.

== Background ==
Gershwin recounted the origin of the song in 1934:

I was in the office of Max Dreyfus, my publisher, one day when Buddy DeSylva walked in. DeSylva said jokingly to me, "George, let's write a hit!" I matched him by saying, "O.K.!" I sat down at the piano, and began playing a theme which I was composing on the spot... Buddy listened for a few minutes and then began chanting this title—"Oh, Do It Again!," which he had just fitted to my theme.

Gershwin began playing the song, described as "innocently sensual", at parties. Upon hearing the song, Irène Bordoni insisted that she perform the song in her show. "Do It Again" first appeared in the Broadway play The French Doll, adapted by A.E. Thomas from a French play by Paul Armont and Marcel Gerbidon, which premiered on February 20, 1922 at the Lyceum and ran for a total of 120 performances.

== Construction ==
In Edward Jablonski's book Gershwin: With a New Critical Discography, he writes that "Do It Again" has "bar-to-bar modulations, distinctive harmonies and un-Tin Pan Alley long-lined melody that mark it as one of Gershwin's finest creations."

== Success ==
Bordoni, the actress who performed the song in The French Doll, earned praise and success with the song's premiere. Alice Delysia's performance of the song (retitled as "Please Do It Again") in the 1922 London revue Mayfair and Montmartre was also well received. That same year, the Paul Whiteman Orchestra's recording found success and helped forge an "auspicious association" between the bandleader and Gershwin. While Bordoni never recorded the song, Delysia did in 1933. Other notable performances include Marilyn Monroe's 1952 live rendition before thousands of marines at Camp Pendleton in Southern California, which caused a "near riot", as well as the version that appears on Judy Garland's 1961 live album Judy at Carnegie Hall.

== Notable recordings ==
- June Christy – 78 rpm single, with Shorty Rogers and His Giants, recorded September 11, 1950 in Los Angeles (1950), Day Dreams, Blue Note/Capitol CD compilation (reissued 1995), Cool Christy Proper Records CD compilation (reissued 2002)
- Sarah Vaughan – Sarah Vaughan Sings George Gershwin (1958) and Gershwin Live! (1982)
- April Stevens – Teach Me Tiger (1960)
- Judy Garland – Judy at Carnegie Hall (1961, reissued many times since)
- Julie London – Whatever Julie Wants (1961) (reissued 2012)
- Shirley Horn – Loads of Love (1963)
- Carol Channing – Thoroughly Modern Millie film soundtrack (LP 1967), (CD 1992)
- Nancy Wilson – But Beautiful (1969)
- Michael Feinstein – Michael & George: Feinstein Sings Gershwin (1998)
- Diana Krall – When I Look in Your Eyes (1999)
- George Gershwin – The Essential George Gershwin (2002)
- Linda Eder – By Myself: The Songs of Judy Garland (2005)
- Rufus Wainwright – Rufus Does Judy at Carnegie Hall and Rufus! Rufus! Rufus! Does Judy! Judy! Judy!: Live from the London Palladium, concert album and DVD (2007)
- Mark Isham and Kate Ceberano – Bittersweet (2009)

== See also ==
- List of 1920s jazz standards
- List of compositions by George Gershwin
