= Travelin' Light (Shirley Horn album) =

1965 studio album by Shirley Horn

Studio album by Shirley Horn
- Released: 1965
- Recorded: February 9, October 19, 1965
- Studio: Bell Sound (New York City)
- Genre: Vocal jazz
- Length: 52:54
- Label: ABC-Paramount Records
- Producer: Johnny Pate

Shirley Horn chronology
Shirley Horn with Horns (1963)	Travelin' Light (1965)	Where Are You Going (1973)

Travelin' Light is a 1965 studio album by Shirley Horn.

== Reception ==
Professional ratings
Review scores
Source	Rating
AllMusic	3.5/5 stars

The AllMusic review by Scott Yanow awarded the album four stars and said that "the main star throughout is Horn. Not all of the material is equally strong and none of the very concise dozen performances clocks in at even three minutes, so this is not an essential session. But Shirley Horn fans and completists will want the generally enjoyable vocal date."

== Track listing ==
1. "Trav'lin' Light" (Johnny Mercer, Jimmy Mundy, Trummy Young) – 2:47
2. "Sunday in New York" (Carroll Coates, Peter Nero) – 1:40
3. "I Could Have Told You" (Carl Sigman, Jimmy Van Heusen) – 2:58
4. "Big City" (Marvin L. Jenkins) – 2:00
5. "I Want to Be with You" (Lee Adams, Charles Strouse) – 2:49
6. "Some of My Best Friends Are the Blues" (Al Byron, Woody Harris) – 2:22
7. "Someone You've Loved" (Johnny Pate) – 2:56
8. "Don't Be on the Outside" (Sidney Wyche, George Kelly, Mayme Watts) – 2:48
9. "You're Blasé" (Ord Hamilton, Bruce Sievier) – 2:22
10. "Yes, I Know When I've Had It" (Pate) – 2:17
11. "Confession" (Howard Dietz, Arthur Schwartz) – 2:26
12. "And I Love Him" (John Lennon, Paul McCartney) – 2:29

== Personnel ==
Performance

- Shirley Horn – piano, vocals
- Joe Newman – trumpet
- Jerome Richardson – flute, tenor saxophone
- Frank Wess - flute, alto and tenor saxophones
- Kenny Burrell – guitar
- Marshall Hawkins – bass
- Bernard Sweetney – drums

Production

- Johnny Pate – brass arrangements (#2,4,8,10), producer
- Hollis King, Dan Serrano – art direction
- Sharon Franklin – assistant
- Andy Baltimore – creative director
- Dave Grusin – executive producer, producer (GRP Records CD reissue)
- Larry Rosen (GRP Records CD reissue)
- Alba Acevedo – graphic design
- James Gavin – liner notes
- Chuck Stewart – photography
- Joseph Doughney, Michael Landy – post-production, producer
- Michael Pollard – producer, production coordination
- Sonny Mediana – production director
- Michael Cuscuna – reissue producer
