= Sidney Clare =

American comedian, dancer and composer (1892–1972)

- Born: August 15, 1892; New York City, New York, U.S.
- Died: August 29, 1972 (aged 80); Los Angeles, California, U.S.
- Occupations: Comedian, dancer, composer
- Spouse: Myrtle Hammerstad

Sidney Clare (August 15, 1892 – August 29, 1972) was an American comedian, dancer and composer. His best-known songs include "On the Good Ship Lollipop" (introduced by Shirley Temple), "You're My Thrill" (recorded by Billie Holiday), and "Please Don't Talk About Me When I'm Gone" (featured in the cartoon One Froggy Evening).

In 1929, Clare wrote his first full film score for Street Girl. He did the film scores for Tanned Legs, Transatlantic Merry-Go-Round, Sing and Be Happy, Hit the Deck, Jimmy and Sally, Bright Eyes, The Littlest Rebel and Rascals.

The Oxford English Dictionary credits Clare with the earliest usage of the term "rock and roll" in 1934 on the soundtrack for the movie Transatlantic Merry-Go-Round. In the early 1940s Clare and several of his fellow hitmakers formed a sensational revue called Songwriters on Parade, performing all across the Eastern seaboard on the Loew's and Keith circuits. He was inducted into the Songwriters Hall of Fame in 1970.

== Selective list of songs ==
- "On the Good Ship Lollipop"
- "What Do You Mean by Loving Somebody Else?"
- "I'm Missin' Mammy's Kissin"
- "Weep No More My Mammy"
- "Oo-Oo Ernest"
- "The Shy Violet"
- "A New Kind of Man"
- "Ma! He's Making Eyes at Me" (with Con Conrad)
- "Big Butter and Egg Man"
- "Me and the Boyfriend"
- "We’re Back Together Again"
- "Then I’ll Be Happy"
- "Miss Annabelle Lee"
- "One Sweet Letter From You"
- "Lovable and Sweet"
- "My Dream Memory"
- "Keeping Myself for You"
- "You're My Thrill"
- "I’ve Got You on Top of My List"
- "It Was A Night in June"
- "Please Don't Talk About Me When I'm Gone"
- "I'd Climb the Highest Mountain (If I Knew I'd Find You)"
