= The Main Ingredient (Shirley Horn album) =

Studio album by Shirley Horn
- Released: 1996
- Recorded: May 15–18, 1995
- Studio: Shirley Horn's home, Washington, D.C.
- Genre: Vocal jazz
- Length: 55:31
- Label: Verve
- Producer: Shirley Horn

Shirley Horn chronology
I Love You, Paris (1994)	The Main Ingredient (1996)	Loving You (1997)

The Main Ingredient is a 1995 album by Shirley Horn.

== Reception ==
Professional ratings
Review scores
Source	Rating
AllMusic	4/5 stars
The Penguin Guide to Jazz	3.5/4 stars

The AllMusic review by Scott Yanow said: "This Shirley Horn CD is a little unusual, as it was recorded at her home. The four sessions utilized some of her favorite musicians... As usual, virtually all of the songs are taken at slow tempos, with 'All or Nothing at All' given a definitive treatment". The Penguin Guide to Jazz commented that the guest musicians added variety, but that the best track was the trio rendition of "The Look of Love".

== Track listing ==
1. "Blues for Sarge" (Ronald R. Dawson) – 4:16
2. "The Look of Love" (Burt Bacharach, Hal David) – 5:22
3. "Keepin' Out of Mischief Now" (Andy Razaf, Fats Waller) – 3:46
4. "The Meaning of the Blues" (Bobby Troup, Leah Worth) – 7:55
5. "Here's Looking at You" (Carroll Coates) – 3:27
6. "You Go to My Head" (John Frederick Coots, Haven Gillespie) – 9:08
7. "Fever" (Eddie Cooley, John Davenport) – 4:42
8. "Come in from the Rain" (Melissa Manchester, Carole Bayer Sager) – 4:50
9. "Peel Me a Grape" (Dave Frishberg) – 2:55
10. "All or Nothing at All" (Arthur Altman, Jack Lawrence) – 7:10

== Personnel ==
- Shirley Horn – piano, vocals
- Joe Henderson – tenor saxophone
- Buck Hill
- Roy Hargrove – flugelhorn
- Charles Ables – guitar, electric bass
- Steve Novosel – double bass
- Billy Hart – drums
- Elvin Jones – drums
- Steve Williams – drums
