= Johnny Mandel =

American musician, composer, and arranger (1925–2020)

- Born: John Alfred Mandel; November 23, 1925; New York City, New York, U.S.
- Died: June 29, 2020 (aged 94); Ojai, California, U.S.
- Education: Manhattan School of Music; Juilliard School
- Occupations: Composer; arranger; multi-instrumentalist
- Relatives: Miles Goodman (cousin)
- Musical career
- Genres: Pop; film music; jazz; folk
- Instruments: Piano; trombone; bass trumpet
- Years active: 1938–2020

John Alfred Mandel (November 23, 1925 – June 29, 2020) was an American composer, multi-instrumentalist, and arranger of popular songs, film music and jazz. The musicians he worked with include Count Basie, Frank Sinatra, Peggy Lee, Anita O'Day, Barbra Streisand, Tony Bennett, Diane Schuur and Shirley Horn. He won five Grammy Awards, from 17 total nominations; his first nomination was for his debut film score for the multi-nominated 1958 film I Want to Live!. In 2011, he was named a Jazz Master by the National Endowment for the Arts.

Among his other film accolades, Mandel also won an Academy Award for Best Original Song for "The Shadow of Your Smile" from The Sandpiper (1965), and was nominated three times each for a Primetime Emmy Award and a Golden Globe Award. He received the Grammy Trustees Award for his contributions to the music industry, in 2018.

== Early life and education ==
Mandel was born in the borough of Manhattan in New York City on November 23, 1925. His father, Alfred, was a garment manufacturer who ran Mandel & Cash; his mother, Hannah (Hart-Rubin), had aimed to be an opera singer and discovered her son had perfect pitch at the age of five. His family was Jewish. They moved to Los Angeles in 1934, after his father's business collapsed during the Great Depression.

Mandel was given piano lessons, but switched to the trumpet and later the trombone. He studied at the Manhattan School of Music and the Juilliard School.

== Career ==
=== Musician ===
In 1943, he played the trumpet with jazz violinist Joe Venuti. The following year, he worked with Billy Rogers and played trombone in the bands of Boyd Raeburn, Jimmy Dorsey, Buddy Rich, Georgie Auld and Chubby Jackson. In 1949 he accompanied the singer June Christy in the orchestra of Bob Cooper. From 1951 until 1953 he played and arranged music in Elliot Lawrence's orchestra, and in 1953 with Count Basie. He subsequently resided in Los Angeles, where he played the bass trumpet for Zoot Sims.

=== Composer and arranger ===
A 1944 Band graduate of New York Military Academy, in Cornwall-on-Hudson, New York, he wrote jazz compositions including "Not Really the Blues" for Woody Herman in 1949, "Hershey Bar" (1950) and "Pot Luck" (1953) for Stan Getz, "Straight Life" (1953) and "Low Life" (1956) for Count Basie, as well as "Tommyhawk" (1954) for Chet Baker.

Mandel performed an interpretation of Erik Satie's "Gnossiennes #4 and #5" on the piano for the film Being There (1979).

He won the Grammy Award for Best Instrumental Arrangement Accompanying Vocal(s) in 1981 for Quincy Jones's song Velas, and again in 1991 for Natalie Cole and Nat King Cole's "Unforgettable", and one year later once more for Shirley Horn's album Here's to Life.

In 2004, Mandel arranged Tony Bennett's album The Art of Romance. Bennett and Mandel had collaborated before on Bennett's The Movie Song Album (1966), for which Mandel arranged and conducted his songs "Emily" and "The Shadow of Your Smile", and was also the album's musical director.

Johnny Mandel, A Man and His Music, featuring The DIVA Jazz Orchestra and vocalist Ann Hampton Callaway was recorded live at Jazz at Lincoln Center's Dizzy's Club Coca-Cola in May 2010, and released by Arbors Records in March 2011.

In 2012, he worked on one of Paul McCartney's most recent songs at the time, "My Valentine". He provided the song with a new and original arrangement. It appeared on McCartney's expanded version of his album Kisses on the Bottom in November of that year.

=== Film and television scores ===
Mandel composed, conducted and arranged the music for numerous movie sound tracks. His earliest credited contribution was to I Want to Live! in 1958, which was nominated for three Grammy Awards. His other compositions include "Suicide Is Painless" (theme song for the movie and TV series M*A*S*H), "Close Enough for Love", "Emily" and "A Time for Love" (nominated for an Academy Award). "Emily" was a favorite of pianist Bill Evans and alto saxophonist Paul Desmond, both of whom included it in live performances until they died, and Evans included it in a duo recording with Tony Bennett.

Mandel wrote numerous film scores, including the score of The Sandpiper. The love theme for that film, "The Shadow of Your Smile", which he co-wrote with Paul Francis Webster, won the 1965 Academy Award for Best Original Song and the Grammy Award for Song of the Year in 1966.

== Honors ==
Mandel was awarded an honorary doctorate from Berklee College of Music in 1993. He was inducted to the Songwriters Hall of Fame in 2010. He was a recipient of the 2011 NEA Jazz Masters Award. He subsequently received The Grammy Trustees Award in 2018, which is awarded by The Recording Academy to "individuals who, during their careers in music, have made significant contributions, other than performance, to the field of recording".

== Personal life ==
Mandel married Lois Lee in 1959, and Martha Blanner in 1972, and had a daughter, Marissa, born in 1976. Mandel was also the cousin of fellow film composer Miles Goodman.

=== Death ===
Mandel died on June 29, 2020, at his home in Ojai, California. He was 94, and suffered from a heart ailment.

== Selected works ==
=== Compositions ===
- "A Christmas Love Song" (lyrics by Alan Bergman & Marilyn Bergman)
- "Close Enough for Love" (lyrics by Paul Williams)
- "Emily" (lyrics by Johnny Mercer)
- "Little Did I Dream" (lyrics by David Frishberg)
- "The Shadow of Your Smile" (lyrics by Paul Francis Webster)
- "Suicide Is Painless" (lyrics by Mike Altman)
- "Summer Wishes, Winter Dreams" (lyrics by Alan Bergman & Marilyn Bergman)
- "A Time for Love" (lyrics by Paul Francis Webster)
- "Where Do You Start?" (lyrics by Alan Bergman & Marilyn Bergman)
- "You Are There" (lyrics by Dave Frishberg)
- "The Moon Song" (aka "Solitary Moon")

=== Arrangements ===
- 1956: Hoagy Sings Carmichael by Hoagy Carmichael
- 1960 Jo + Jazz by Jo Stafford
- 1960: Ring-a-Ding-Ding! by Frank Sinatra
- 1962: I Dig the Duke! I Dig the Count! by Mel Tormé
- 1966: "Emily" and "The Shadow of Your Smile" from The Movie Song Album by Tony Bennett
- 1975: "Mirrors" by Peggy Lee
- 1979: "Coolsville" and "Company" from Rickie Lee Jones by Rickie Lee Jones
- 1981: "Velas" from The Dude by Quincy Jones
- 1991: "Mona Lisa", "Smile", "Lush Life", "That Sunday That Summer", "Too Young", "Our Love is Here to Stay", "Unforgettable" from Unforgettable... with Love by Natalie Cole
- 1992: Here's to Life by Shirley Horn
- 1992: "God Bless the Child" and "Body and Soul" from In Tribute by Diane Schuur
- 1992: The Christmas Album by Manhattan Transfer
- 1993: "Will You Be There" by Michael Jackson
- 1995: Pearls by David Sanborn
- 1999: When I Look in Your Eyes by Diana Krall
- 2001: You're My Thrill by Shirley Horn
- 2003: "Summer Wind" ,"That's All (1952 song)" by Michael Buble
- 2004: The Art of Romance by Tony Bennett
- 2009: Love Is the Answer by Barbra Streisand

=== Filmography ===
Johnny Mandel composed and/or arranged music for the following motion pictures or television programs:

- 1958: I Want to Live!
- 1960: The 3rd Voice
- 1961: The Lawbreakers
- 1963: Drums of Africa
- 1964: The Americanization of Emily
- 1965: The Sandpiper
- 1965: Mister Roberts (TV series; 1 episode)
- 1966: Harper
- 1966: An American Dream
- 1966: The Russians Are Coming, the Russians Are Coming
- 1966: Bob Hope Presents the Chrysler Theatre (TV series; 2 episodes)
- 1967: Point Blank
- 1968: Pretty Poison
- 1969: Heaven with a Gun
- 1969: That Cold Day in the Park
- 1969: Some Kind of a Nut
- 1970: M*A*S*H
- 1970: The Man Who Had Power Over Women
- 1972: M*A*S*H (TV series)
- 1972: Journey Through Rosebud
- 1972: Molly and Lawless John
- 1973: The Last Detail
- 1973: Summer Wishes, Winter Dreams
- 1974: W
- 1975: Escape to Witch Mountain
- 1976: Freaky Friday
- 1976: The Sailor Who Fell from Grace with the Sea
- 1979: Agatha
- 1979: Being There
- 1979: The Baltimore Bullet
- 1980: Too Close for Comfort (TV series; 2 episodes)
- 1980: Caddyshack
- 1982: Deathtrap
- 1982: Lookin' to Get Out
- 1982: The Verdict
- 1986: Amazing Stories (TV series; 1 episode)
- 1989: Brenda Starr

=== Discography ===
- 1953: Dance Session with Count Basie (Clef)
- 1966: Quietly There, Bill Perkins Quintet (Riverside)
- 1958: A Sure Thing: David Allen Sings Jerome Kern (Pacific Jazz)
- 2011: Johnny Mandel, A Man and His Music, with The DIVA Jazz Orchestra and Ann Hampton Callaway (Arbors)

== Awards and nominations ==
Award	Year	Category	Work	Result	Ref.
Academy Awards	1966	Best Original Song	"The Shadow of Your Smile" (from The Sandpiper)	Won	
Academy Awards	1967	Best Original Song	"A Time for Love" (from An American Dream)	Nominated	
Golden Globe Awards	1966	Best Original Score	The Sandpiper	Nominated	
Golden Globe Awards	1966	Best Original Song	"The Shadow of Your Smile" (from The Sandpiper)	Nominated	
Golden Globe Awards	1973	Best Original Song	"Take Me Home" (from Molly and Lawless John)	Nominated	
Grammy Awards	1959	Best Sound Track Album or Recording of Original Cast From a Motion Picture or Television	I Want to Live!	Nominated	
Grammy Awards	1959	Best Performance by an Orchestra or Instrumentalist with Orchestra	I Want to Live!	Nominated	
Grammy Awards	1959	Best Instrumental Composition	Title theme (from I Want to Live!)	Nominated	
Grammy Awards	1966	Best Score Soundtrack for Visual Media	The Sandpiper	Won	
Grammy Awards	1966	Best Arrangement, Instrumental or A Cappella	"The Shadow of Your Smile" (from The Sandpiper)	Nominated	
Grammy Awards	1971	Best Score Soundtrack for Visual Media	M*A*S*H	Nominated	
Grammy Awards	1977	Best Instrumental Composition	"Midnight Soul Patrol"	Nominated	
Grammy Awards	1982	Best Arrangement, Instrumental or A Cappella	"Velas"	Won	
Grammy Awards	1992	Best Arrangement, Instrumental and Vocals	"Unforgettable"	Won	
Grammy Awards	1993	Best Arrangement, Instrumental and Vocals	"Here's to Life"	Won	
Grammy Awards	1994	Best Arrangement, Instrumental and Vocals	"Some Enchanted Evening"	Nominated	
Grammy Awards	1995	Best Arrangement, Instrumental and Vocals	"Young at Heart"	Nominated	
Grammy Awards	2000	Best Arrangement, Instrumental and Vocals	"In the Wee Small Hours of the Morning"	Nominated	
Grammy Awards	2000	Album of the Year	When I Look in Your Eyes	Nominated	
Grammy Awards	2002	Best Arrangement, Instrumental and Vocals	"You're My Thrill"	Nominated	
Primetime Emmy Awards	1986	Outstanding Music Composition for a Limited or Anthology Series, Movie or Special	A Letter to Three Wives	Nominated	
Primetime Emmy Awards	1987	Outstanding Music Composition for a Limited or Anthology Series, Movie or Special	LBJ: The Early Years	Nominated	
Primetime Emmy Awards	1988	Outstanding Music Composition for a Limited or Anthology Series, Movie or Special	Foxfire	Nominated	

== See also ==
- List of jazz arrangers
- List of music arrangers
