= Joel E. Siegel =

Professor Of English and Film Studies

- Born: June 25, 1940; Washington, Pennsylvania
- Died: March 11, 2004; Washington, D.C.
- Occupations: Lyricist, Author, Film critic, Music Producer, English Professor

Joel E. Siegel (1940 – 11 March 2004) was a professor of English and film studies at Georgetown University, a film and music critic, a music producer, and a lyricist. He won the 1993 Grammy Award for Best Album Notes together with Buck Clayton and Phil Schaap for their work on the notes for the Billie Holiday box set, The Complete Billie Holiday on Verve (1945-1959).

Siegel received his bachelor's degree from Cornell University in 1962 and his master's degree and doctorate in English from Northwestern University. Siegel wrote for JazzTimes, Washingtonian, Washington Newsworks, "Washington Calendar Magazine," Washington City Paper, and Washington Tribune. He was the author of a 1973 study of movie producer Val Lewton, Val Lewton: The Reality of Terror.

He acted as producer for albums of Shirley Horn and Patti Wicks.

He taught at Georgetown University until 1998. He resided in Arlington, Virginia. He died at age 63 of spinal meningitis. He was survived by his parents, Sherman and Miriam Danzinger Siegel, and a sister, Judith Siegel-Baum. He was openly gay.
