= Curtis Reginald Lewis =

American composer (1918–1969)

Curtis Reginald Lewis (August 29, 1918 – May 23, 1969) was an American composer of popular songs, many of which have become jazz standards. He was born in Fort Worth, Texas, grew up in Chicago, and came to New York City in the 1940s. Lewis subsequently became one of the first black composers and lyricists to own a music publishing company on Broadway in the early 1950s.

He died in Kew Gardens, New York. Having served in the United States Army during World War II (from August 22, 1942, discharged as a Staff Sergeant December 2, 1945), his body was interred at the Long Island National Cemetery, Farmingdale, NY.

== Selected compositions ==
- "All Night Long"

Shirley Horn; Album: All Night Long (1981)
Billie Holiday
George Shearing Quintet with Nancy Wilson; Album: The Swingin's Mutual!
Freddie Roach; Album: Brown Sugar
Aretha Franklin; Album: Sweet Bitter Love
Sonny Criss; Album: Crisscraft (Muse, 1975)
Sandy Graham; Album: Sandy Graham
Elkie Brooks; Album: No More the Fool: The Collection
Rolf Delfos, Marijn Wijnands; Album: Complete Boulevard of Broken Dreams
Beverley Staunton, Album: Here's to You
Mary Stallings; Album: Live at the Village Vanguard
Mary Stallings; Album: San Francisco Jazz Festival
Dylan Cramer; Album: All Night Long (2001)
Nancy Wilson; Album: Lady Sings the Blues
Joe Sample, Randy Crawford; Album: Feeling Good
Diana Krall; Album: Only Trust Your Heart (1995)

- "All Soul"
- "Blue City"

Shirley Horn; Album: Embers And Ashes (1960)
Shirley Horn; Album: The Garden of the Blues (1984)

- "Fortune Teller, Marion Keene" (1955)
- "Garden of the Blues Suite, The"
- "Great City, The"

Shirley Horn; Album: The Garden of the Blues (1984)

- "He Never Mentioned Love"

Shirley Horn; Album: Embers And Ashes (1960)
Shirley Horn; Album: The Garden of the Blues (1984)

Claire Martin; Album: He Never Mentioned Love (2007)
Sarah Vaughan; Album: The Complete Sarah Vaughan On Mercury Vol. 4 - 1963–1967

- "He’s Gone Again"

Shirley Horn; Album: The Garden of the Blues (1984)

- "Now or Never" — Billie Holiday (music), Curtis R. Lewis (words)
- "Old Country"

Shirley Horn; Album: The Garden of the Blues (1984)

- "Roaming Lover"

Shirley Horn; Album: The Garden of the Blues (1984)

- "Today I Sing the Blues"
- "What Would a Woman Do?"

Shirley Horn; Album: The Garden of the Blues (1984)

- "You Oughta Be Mine"

== Selected albums ==
The Garden of the Blues Shirley Horn sings Curtis Lewis, Steeple Chase Records

== Film and TV ==
- Blown Away (1994): song, All Night Long
