= Shirley Horn =

American jazz singer and pianist (1934–2005)

- Publicity photo from 1961

Background information
- Born: Shirley Valerie Horn; May 1, 1934; Washington, D.C., U.S.
- Died: October 20, 2005 (aged 71)
- Genres: Jazz, blues
- Occupation: Musician
- Instruments: Vocals, piano
- Years active: 1959–2004
- Labels: Stere-o-craft (1960); Mercury (1963); ABC-Paramount (1965); Perception (1972); SteepleChase (1978-81); CBS (1985); Verve (1987-2005)
- Formerly of: Miles Davis; Charles Ables; Steve Williams

Shirley Valerie Horn (May 1, 1934 – October 20, 2005) was an American jazz singer and pianist. She collaborated with many jazz musicians including Miles Davis, Dizzy Gillespie, Toots Thielemans, Ron Carter, Carmen McRae, Wynton Marsalis and others. She was most noted for her ability to accompany herself with nearly incomparable independence and ability on the piano while singing, something described by arranger Johnny Mandel as "like having two heads", and for her rich, lush voice, a smoky contralto, which was described by noted producer and arranger Quincy Jones as "like clothing, as she seduces you with her voice".

== Biography ==
Shirley Horn was born on May 1, 1934, and raised in Washington, D.C. Encouraged by her grandmother, an amateur organist, Horn began piano lessons at the age of four. Aged 12, she studied piano and composition at Howard University, later graduating from there in classical music. Horn was offered a place at the Juilliard School, but her family could not afford to send her there. Horn formed her first jazz piano trio when she was 20. Horn's early piano influences were Erroll Garner, Oscar Peterson and Ahmad Jamal, and moving away from her classical background, Horn later said that "Oscar Peterson became my Rachmaninov, and Ahmad Jamal became my Debussy." She then became enamored with the U Street jazz area of Washington (largely destroyed in the 1968 riots), sneaking into jazz clubs before she was of legal age.

According to jazz journalist James Gavin, the small New York City record label Stere-O-Craft discovered Horn in Washington, D.C., and brought her to New York, to record her first album, 1960's Embers and Ashes. Horn had recorded with violinist Stuff Smith in Washington, D.C., in 1959, as a pianist in one of the rhythm sections featured on Cat on a Hot Fiddle. Unfortunately for Horn, Verve Records did not include her name on the album's list of backing musicians, and the experience did not raise her professional profile. (A later reissue of Stuff Smith's Verve recordings on Mosaic Records documented Horn's participation and included three Horn vocal performances of George Gershwin songs that were left off the album.)

Horn's Embers and Ashes record attracted the attention of jazz trumpeter Miles Davis, who praised Horn publicly and invited her to play intermission sets during his performances at the Village Vanguard. Davis's praise had particular resonance in two respects: because he was highly respected as a musician, and because he rarely offered public praise for fellow musicians at that time. A 1961 live performance recorded in St. Louis' Gaslight Square district was eventually released on LP under the title "Live" at the Village Vanguard. (A later CD reissue of this material was released under the title At the Gaslight Square 1961).

By 1962, Horn had attracted the attention of Mercury Records vice-president (and jazz arranger) Quincy Jones, who signed Horn to Mercury. On her two Mercury LPs, Horn was placed in a traditional pop setting with medium-sized jazz orchestra, and on neither album did she play piano. According to jazz journalist James Gavin, a third Mercury LP was recorded but never issued, and as of 1993, the tapes for that album were presumed to be lost. Horn's final LP of the 1960s was 1965's Travelin' Light, recorded for ABC-Paramount. She was popular with jazz critics, but did not achieve significant popular success.

Though she had recorded a song by The Beatles, And I love him (And I love her), on Travelin' Light, Horn for the most part resisted efforts to remake her into a popular singer in the mid-1960s, later saying of such attempts "I will not stoop to conquer." From the late-1960s to the late 1970s, she was semi-retired from music, staying in Washington, D.C., to raise her daughter Rainy with her husband, Sheppard Deering (whom she had married in 1955), and largely limiting her music to local performances. She made one album in 1972 for Perception Records, but the record received little notice, and Horn did not tour to promote it.

In 1978, Horn's career got a boost when SteepleChase Records of Denmark tracked her down in Washington, D.C., and offered to record her with drummer Billy Hart, (whom Horn had known for many years) and bassist Buster Williams. The resulting album, A Lazy Afternoon was the first of a total of four Horn albums released by SteepleChase between 1978 and 1984. Horn also began to play engagements in North America and Europe, including the North Sea Jazz Festival, where two of her albums were recorded.

In 1986, Horn signed a one-record deal with CBS-Sony for the Japanese market and released All of Me, a studio session recorded in New York City with her regular rhythm section, plus guest Frank Wess on three tracks. By early 1987, Verve Records was pursuing a recording contract with her, and in May of that year, the live album I Thought About You, her first for Verve, was recorded in Hollywood. Horn recorded one further session for an independent jazz label (1987's Softly, for Audiophile Records), then returned to Verve. She released a total of 11 studio and live albums for Verve during her lifetime (additional compilation albums added to this total). Horn's most commercially successful years were spent with Verve, and the label helped her find a large international audience.

Miles Davis made a rare appearance as a backing musician on Horn's 1991 album, You Won't Forget Me. Although she preferred to perform in small settings, such as her trio, she also recorded with orchestras, as on the 1992 album Here's to Life, the title song of which became her signature song. A video documentary of Horn's life and music was released at the same time as "Here's To Life" and shared its title. At the time, arranger Johnny Mandel commented that Horn's piano skill was comparable to that of Bill Evans. A follow-up was made in 2001, named You're My Thrill.

Horn worked with the same rhythm section for 25 years: Charles Ables (electric bass) and Steve Williams (drums). Don Heckman wrote in the Los Angeles Times (February 2, 1995) about "the importance of bassist Charles Ables and drummer Steve Williams to Horn's sound. Working with boundless subtlety, following her every spontaneous twist and turn, they were the ideal accompanists for a performer who clearly will tolerate nothing less than perfection".

Her albums Here's to Life, Light Out of Darkness (A Tribute to Ray Charles) and I Love You, Paris all reached number one on the Billboard jazz chart.

A breast cancer survivor, she had been battling diabetes when she died of complications from the condition, aged 71. She is interred at Ft. Lincoln Cemetery near Washington, D.C. Since her death, concert recordings of Horn have been released on CD and DVD by Resonance Records and Image Entertainment.

== Awards and honors ==
Horn was nominated for nine Grammy Awards during her career, winning the Grammy Award for Best Jazz Vocal Performance at the 41st Grammy Awards for I Remember Miles, a tribute to her friend and mentor (the album's cover featuring a Miles Davis drawing of them both).

She was officially recognized by the 109th US Congress for "her many achievements and contributions to the world of jazz and American culture", and performed at The White House for several U.S. presidents. Horn was awarded an honorary Doctor of Music degree from the Berklee College of Music in 2002.

She was awarded the National Endowment for the Arts Jazz Masters Award in 2005 (the highest honors that the United States bestows upon jazz musicians).

== Discography ==
=== As leader ===
- Embers and Ashes (Stere-o-Craft, 1961) – recorded in 1960
- Loads of Love (Mercury, 1963) – recorded in 1962
- Shirley Horn with Horns (Mercury, 1963)
- Travelin' Light (ABC-Paramount, 1965)
- Where Are You Going (Perception, 1973)
- A Lazy Afternoon (SteepleChase, 1979) – recorded in 1978
- All Night Long (SteepleChase, 1981) – live
- Violets for Your Furs (SteepleChase, 1982) – live
- The Garden of the Blues (SteepleChase, 1985) – live recorded in 1984
- I Thought About You (Verve, 1987) – live
- All of Me (CBS/Sony, 1987)
- Softly (Audiophile, 1988)
- Close Enough for Love (Verve, 1989)
- You Won't Forget Me (Verve, 1991)
- Here's to Life (Verve, 1992)
- Light Out of Darkness (A Tribute to Ray Charles) (Verve, 1993)
- I Love You, Paris (Verve, 1994) – live recorded in 1992
- The Main Ingredient (Verve, 1996) – recorded in 1995
- Loving You (Verve, 1997)
- I Remember Miles (Verve, 1998) – recorded in 1997
- You're My Thrill (Verve, 2001)
- May the Music Never End (Verve, 2003)
- Live at the 1994 Monterey Jazz Festival (Concord, 2008) – live
- Live at the 4 Queens (Resonance, 2016) – live

=== As guest ===
- Benny Carter, Benny Carter Songbook (MusicMasters, 1996) – recorded in 1995
- Bill Charlap, Stardust (Blue Note, 2003) – recorded in 2001
- Benny Golson, One Day, Forever (Arkadia Jazz, 2001) – recorded in 1996–2000
- Charlie Haden, The Art of the Song (Verve, 1999)
- Quincy Jones, For Love of Ivy (ABC, 1968) – Soundtrack
- Carmen McRae, Sarah: Dedicated to You (BMG/Novus, 1991) *piano only
- Oscar Peterson, A Tribute to Oscar Peterson – Live at the Town Hall (Telarc, 1997) – live recorded in 1996
- Jeffery Smith, Ramona (Gitanes/Verve, 1995)
- Stuff Smith, Cat on a Hot Fiddle (Verve, 1960) – recorded in 1959
- Clark Terry Quintet, Live on QE2 (Chiaroscuro, 2001) – live
- Toots Thielemans, For My Lady (EmArcy, 1991)
- Joe Williams, In Good Company (Verve, 1989)
- Marian McPartland's Piano Jazz with Guest Shirley Horn (Jazz Alliance, 2006) – recorded in 1984
- Wynton Marsalis, Tune in Tomorrow (Columbia, 1990)

=== DVD-Video ===
- Live at the Village Vanguard (Lucy II, 2006)

== See also ==
- List of jazz arrangers
