= Out of the Blues: The Best of David Bromberg =

Compilation album by David Bromberg
- Released: 1977
- Genre: Folk rock
- Label: Columbia

David Bromberg chronology
Reckless Abandon (1977)	Out of the Blues: The Best of David Bromberg (1977)	Bandit in a Bathing Suit (1978)

Out of the Blues: The Best of David Bromberg is a compilation album by American multi-instrumentalist and singer-songwriter David Bromberg, released by Columbia Records in 1977.

== Critical reception ==
Professional ratings
Review scores
Source	Rating
Allmusic	3/5 stars

On Allmusic, Stephen Thomas Erlewine said, "Out of the Blues: Best of David Bromberg is a solid ten-track collection that features many highlights from Bromberg's '70s recordings, including both originals... and covers.... It's a good summation of his prime period and, therefore, a good introduction to his music."

Billboard wrote, "A 'best' package with some live sets dating back as far as 1972. Traces the development and influences of Bromberg's style with a collage of blues, country, funky r&b, and jazz all punctuated by some fine guitar picking."

== Track listing ==
=== Side one ===
1. "The Holdup" (David Bromberg, George Harrison) – 3:02
2. "Send Me to the 'Lectric Chair" [live] (George Brooks) – 4:52
3. "The Joke's on Me" (Bromberg) – 3:31
4. "Mr. Bojangles" [live] (Jerry Jeff Walker) – 7:25
5. "The New Lee Highway Blues" (Bromberg) – 5:40

=== Side two ===
1. "Suffer to Sing the Blues" (Bromberg) – 4:54
2. "Kansas City" [live] (Jerry Leiber and Mike Stoller)– 3:57
3. "Demon in Disguise" (Bromberg) – 5:05
4. "(What a) Wonderful World" (Sam Cooke, Herb Alpert, Lou Adler) – 3:23
5. "Sharon" (Bromberg) – 6:05

== Original albums ==
The songs on Out of the Blues: The Best of David Bromberg were excerpted from the following albums.

- David Bromberg (1972) – "Suffer to Sing the Blues"
- Demon in Disguise (1972) – "Mr. Bojangles", "Demon in Disguise", "Sharon"
- Wanted Dead or Alive (1974) – "The Holdup", "Send Me to the 'Lectric Chair", "The New Lee Highway Blues", "Kansas City"
- Midnight on the Water (1975) – "The Joke's on Me", "(What a) Wonderful World"
