= Use Me (David Bromberg album) =

Studio album by David Bromberg
- Released: July 12, 2011
- Genres: Folk rock, blues
- Length: 46:19
- Label: Appleseed

David Bromberg chronology
Live: New York City 1982 (2008)	Use Me (2011)	Only Slightly Mad (2013)

Use Me is an album by David Bromberg. It was released by Appleseed Recordings on July 12, 2011.

Most of the tracks on Use Me were written and produced by musical associates of Bromberg, who also perform the songs with him. These collaborating artists and bands are Dr. John, Vince Gill, Levon Helm, John Hiatt, Keb' Mo', Tim O'Brien, Linda Ronstadt, Los Lobos, Widespread Panic, and the Butcher Bros.

== Critical reception ==
Professional ratings
Review scores
Source	Rating
AllMusic	3.5/5 stars
American Songwriter	3.5/5 stars
Rolling Stone	3/5 stars
Roughstock	4/5 stars

In AllMusic, Rick Anderson wrote, "Guitarist and fiddler David Bromberg is a legend in roots music circles, a genuine guitar virtuoso and session ace whose quirky mystique has been burnished by periodic withdrawals from the public eye... The aptly titled Use Me is the result of an unusual collaborative effort: Bromberg contacted some of his favorite songwriters... and asked them to write songs for him. The result is a completely entertaining and at times thrilling program of material in a wide variety of styles... Singing has never been Bromberg's strong suit, but over the years he has learned to make the most of his limited vocal instrument... There's a pervasive sense of mutual affection and musical respect throughout this album that makes it a pleasure to listen to even in those moments when its other elements don't quite come together perfectly."

In Roughstock, Stormy Lewis said, "David Bromberg is one of the most prolific and famous musicians that most people have never heard of. He spent most of the 1970's wandering the country with his musician friends, folks like Jerry Jeff Walker and George Harrison, leaving behind underexposed albums in his wake.... Use Me is an interesting album, that puts a spin on the idea of a "with friends" album. Instead of the traditional duets, Bromberg asked many of his friends to either select or write a song for him, and then produce the track on the album. The result is a diverse collection of songs that span the depth and breadth of the rough collection of styles that make up Americana.... Use Me is a cleverly crafted album that shows the breadth of David Bromberg's talent while allowing him to make music with a dozen of his friends. Over all, it is a solid collection of songs that make up an entertaining album. As can be expected, the quality of the track depends on the guest and the ease with which they can pull Bromberg into their chosen styles."

In Rolling Stone, Will Hermes wrote, "This former Bob Dylan sideman would like you to know he has other talented pals. Here he asks a bunch of them... to pen songs or pick covers, then join him in the studio.... If the most memorable songs here are the titular Bill Withers classic and his own 'Tongue' ('You best get your tongue out of my mouth / Because I'm kissing you goodbye!'), Bromberg still makes every track shine, like the A-list session man he's always been."

Writing in American Songwriter, Lynn Margolis said, "When David Bromberg decided it was time to once again climb out from behind his violin-store counter and back into the studio, he made a few phone calls.... Inspired by a suggestion from his wife, Bromberg went a step further and asked most of these artists to write a song for him, then produce him playing it.... Just about every track on here contains at least some A-list session players, all of whom easily hold their own against Bromberg’s outsized guitar and dobro talents."

In Relix, Jeff Tamarkin wrote, "Use Me is a vastly more entertaining and exciting recording [than Bromberg's previous album, Try Me One More Time]. "Old Neighborhood" — with Widespread Panic — is full of swampy dueling guitars, while "Lookout Mountain Girl", with assistance from Vince Gill, is an update of the kind of acoustic brilliance that Bromberg cut his teeth on. Hell, he's even singing better than ever!"

In the Milwaukee Journal Sentinel, John M. Gilbertson said, "On Hiatt's easy-strolling "Ride On Out a Ways", Los Lobos' Tex-Mex waltz "The Long Goodbye" and Vince Gill and Guy Clark's cheerfully two-stepping "Lookout Mountain Girl", Bromberg casually throws out riffs and licks that nevertheless stick. Even his singing, which is thinner and weaker than his other skills, expresses the charming nonchalance of a guy who never has to worry about the company he keeps."

== Track listing ==
1. "Tongue" (David Bromberg) – 3:31
2. "Ride On Out a Ways" (John Hiatt) – 3:45
3. "Bring It With You When You Come" (Gus Cannon) – 3:39
4. "Blue Is Fallin'" (Tim O'Brien) – 4:08
5. "You Don't Wanna Make Me Mad" (Mac Rebennack) – 4:31
6. "Diggin' in the Deep Blue Sea" (Kevin Moore, Gary Nicholson) – 5:44
7. "The Long Goodbye" (David Hidalgo, Louie Pérez) – 3:32
8. "Old Neighborhood" (Michael Houser, John Bell, John Hermann, Dave Schools, Domingo Ortiz, Todd Nance) – 3:58
9. "It's Just a Matter of Time" (Brook Benton, Belford Hendricks, Clyde Otis) – 3:09
10. "Lookout Mountain Girl" (Vince Gill) – 3:53
11. "Use Me" (Bill Withers) – 6:28

== Personnel ==
=== Musicians ===
- "Tongue" – with Levon Helm
- "Ride On Out a Ways" – with John Hiatt
- "Bring It With You When You Come" – with Levon Helm
- "Blue is Fallin'" – with Tim O'Brien
- "You Don't Wanna Make Me Mad" – with Dr. John
- "Diggin' in the Deep Blue Sea" – with Keb' Mo'
- "The Long Goodbye" – with Los Lobos
- "Old Neighborhood" – with Widespread Panic
- "It's Just a Matter of Time" – with Linda Ronstadt
- "Lookout Mountain Girl" – with Vince Gill
- "Use Me" – produced by the Butcher Bros.

=== Production ===
- Producers: Each track was produced by the collaborating musical artist, except "Tongue" and "Bring It With You When You Come" which were produced by Larry Campbell.
- Executive producers: David Bromberg, Mark McKenna
- Recording and mixing: Marc Moss, except "Tongue" and "Bring It With You When You Come" recorded by Justin Guip, "Lookout Mountain Girl" recorded by Drew Bollman, and "Use Me" recorded and mixed by Phil Nicolo and Joe Nicolo
- Mastering: Richard Dodd
- Design: Christina Galbiati
- Photos: Jim McGuire, Marc Moss, Good Footage Productions, Bob Taylor
