= Live: New York City 1982 =

Live album by David Bromberg Quartet
- Released: July 14, 2008
- Recorded: 1982
- Genre: Bluegrass, folk
- Length: 71:00
- Label: Appleseed

David Bromberg chronology
Try Me One More Time (2007)	Live: New York City 1982 (2008)	Use Me (2011)

Live: New York City 1982 is an album by the David Bromberg Quartet. As the title indicates, it was recorded live in New York City in 1982. It was released by Appleseed Recordings on July 14, 2008.

On Live: New York City 1982, David Bromberg and his band – Gene Johnson, Jeff Wisor, and Butch Amiot – play bluegrass and folk songs using various combinations of acoustic guitar, mandolin, fiddle, and bass guitar. The tunes are all covers, except for one original, "The New Lee Highway Blues".

== Critical reception ==
Professional ratings
Review scores
Source	Rating
Allmusic	3.5/5 stars
Philadelphia Daily News	A−

On AllMusic, Jeff Tamarkin said, "A listen to this ambiguously titled disc — nowhere does it say exactly where in New York City or when in 1982 the live performance took place — confirms repeatedly that Bromberg was a whiz as an instrumentalist. As a vocalist, less so, but his coterie of loyalists never held that against him, and there is a charm to his ragged singing that befits the down-home-ness of the pickin'.... Bromberg and his three support players (wielding various acoustic stringed instruments) keep the level of virtuosity high."

In the Philadelphia Daily News, Jonathan Takiff wrote, "West Chester-based Appleseed Recordings' latest serving is an amazing concert date by the David Bromberg Quartet, Live: New York City 1982.... [Bromberg] showed such variety he proved a folk festival unto himself, leading a jumping little string band... Sonic quality ain't all that, but the performances are killer."

In The Bluegrass Special, David McGee wrote, "No mere relic of an earlier time by a younger artist at his peak, the David Bromberg Quartet's Live: New York City 1982, previously available only years ago in a limited edition, has been remastered to a brilliant, pristine clarity by Marc Moss, the better to serve an evening of instrumental virtuosity alternately incendiary and sensitive, and soulful vocal meditations in blues and country.... Live: New York City 1982 captures a blessed night of music making by four gifted, deeply soulful musicians."

On Blogcritics, David Bowling said, "The vocals are more than competent, but it is the instrumental interplay that is spectacular. The opening ten-minute medley gives each group member the opportunity to shine and fit their sound together. Bromberg is at home on both the mandolin and fiddle and he melds with the other members of the group creating an ebb and flow of sound. Whether it is one mandolin and two fiddles or two fiddles and one mandolin playing together, the sound is full and harmonious.... In the final analysis, Live: New York City 1982 is a feast of sound and song, mostly within a bluegrass setting."

On Folk and Acoustic Music Exchange, Mike Jurkovic wrote, "Be it Bob Dylan's as-of-then-unreleased, Desire-era country waltz "Wallflower", or more traditional bluegrass fare as the rollicking "Stay All Night" or the classic "Dark Hollow", the superior musicianship and intuitive interplay that has defined not only Bromberg solo but his band excursions is on full glorious display throughout LNYC 1982."

In Green Man Review, David Kidney wrote, "This live album has been remastered and sounds darn good. There's some fine picking and vocalizing, and the songs are fun to listen to. It could serve as a workshop for up-and-coming pickers. Slow it down and try to play along, then gradually speed it up. If you can keep up, you'll be much improved by the end."

Rambles.net said, "This recording is exactly as advertised: guitar/mandolin/fiddle master David Bromberg's string band (long since extinct) at its hottest... As such things go, Live is a lot of fun, if not always an exercise in subtlety... From the sound of things, all concerned — wherever they were standing in relation to the stage — were having a good time that night. I'm not a huge fan of live albums, but this is undoubtedly among the better ones..."

== Track listing ==
1. "Don't Let Your Deal Go Down", including fiddle tune medley – 10:21
  - "Red Apple Rag" (Traditional, arranged and adapted by David Bromberg)
  - "Blackberry Blossom" (Traditional, arranged and adapted by Bromberg)
  - "Turkey in the Straw" (Traditional, arranged and adapted by Bromberg)
  - "Dixie Hoedown" (Jim McReynolds, Jesse McReynolds)
  - "Bill Cheatem" (Traditional, arranged and adapted by Bromberg)
  - "June Apple" (Traditional, arranged and adapted by Bromberg)
2. "Wallflower" (Bob Dylan) – 3:25
3. "Stay All Night" (Tommy Duncan) – 3:15
4. "Ookpik Waltz" (Frankie Rodgers) – 5:38
5. "When I Was a Cowboy" (Ralph McTell) – 3:54
6. "Dark Hollow" (Bill Browning) – 5:47
7. "The Creeper's Blues" (Furry Lewis) – 5:49
8. "Midnight Hour Blues" (Leroy Carr) – 4:44
9. Medley – 4:35
  - "Sally Gooden" (Traditional, arranged and adapted by Bromberg)
  - "Old Joe Clark" (Traditional, arranged and adapted by Bromberg)
  - "Wheel Hoss" (Bill Monroe)
10. "On Our Last Date" (Conway Twitty, Floyd Cramer) – 5:05
11. "Fairfax County" (David Massengill) – 6:17
12. "The New Lee Highway Blues" (Bromberg) – 7:42
13. "Workin' on a Building" (Traditional, arranged and adapted by Bromberg) – 4:20

== Personnel ==
=== David Bromberg Quartet ===
- David Bromberg – guitar, mandolin, fiddle, vocals
- Gene Johnson – mandolin, fiddle, vocals
- Robert "Butch" Amiot – bass, vocals
- Jeff Wisor – fiddle, mandolin, vocals

=== Production ===
- House engineer: Larry Droppa
- Monitor engineer: David Callahan
- Remastering engineer: Marc Moss
- Packaging: Christina Galbiati
- Liner notes: David Bromberg
