= How Late'll Ya Play 'Til? =

Studio album / Live album by David Bromberg
- Released: 1976
- Genre: Folk rock
- Label: Fantasy
- Producer: Steve Burgh, David Bromberg

David Bromberg chronology
Midnight on the Water (1975)	How Late'll Ya Play 'Til? (1976)	Reckless Abandon (1977)

How Late'll Ya Play 'Til? is an album by David Bromberg. His fifth album, it was released by Fantasy Records in 1976 as a two-disc LP.

How Late'll Ya Play 'Til? was recorded in California. The first disc was recorded at Fantasy Studios in Berkeley, the Record Plant in Sausalito, and Cherokee Studios in Los Angeles. The second disc was recorded live, on June 18 and 19, 1976, at the Great American Music Hall in San Francisco.

The album was released on CD as two separate titles. How Late'll Ya Play 'Til? Volume 1: Live contains all six tracks from the second disc of the double LP, along with two additional tracks, "Loaded and Laid" and "Make Me a Pallet", that were not on the LP release. How Late'll Ya Play 'Til? Volume 2: Studio contains all eleven tracks from the first disc, along with three added tracks — "Kitchen Girl," "Long Afternoons" and "Nashville Again".

== Critical reception ==
Professional ratings
Review scores
Source	Rating
Allmusic (LP record)	3/5 stars
Allmusic (Volume 1)	4/5 stars
Allmusic (Volume 2)	3/5 stars

When the album was released, Billboard wrote, "...in his first LP for Fantasy [Bromberg] is taking a solid commercial shot at presenting his specialized style in the most elegant support package possible. This is a twin-disk set, evenly divided between live and studio cuts. Bromberg's virtuoso guitar picking and insinuating voice is backed with a horn group that comes on like a cross between the Dirt Band and Springsteen's E-St. group. The leader flashes brightly through his own tongue-in-cheek originals and raunchy blues ballads by the likes of Blind Willie McTell or Robert Johnson. A well-thought-out fan winner."

Reviewing the record for Allmusic, William Ruhlmann said, "Bromberg's band, with two horns and a fiddle player, is capable of playing just about any style of popular music, and most of them are here on a double album, half recorded in the studio and half live. (Fantasy has also issued the two discs separately.) The standout inclusion is Bromberg's "Will Not Be Your Fool", which became his onstage showstopper from here on out."

In Allmusic's review of the Volume 1: Live CD, Richard Foss wrote, "David Bromberg has been such an effective sideman for so long, it could be possible to not notice what a wonderful entertainer the man is when he is at center stage. How Late'll Ya Play 'Til?, Vol. 1 catches Bromberg and a crack band having a fine time on mostly humorous tunes. Of course, Bromberg does play guitar throughout the album, but the real attraction here is his bluesy vocal turns and his razor-sharp comedic timing. Though "Will Not Be Your Fool" is his signature piece and is very well performed here, the highlight is the incredible "Bullfrog Blues"."

== Track listing ==
=== LP disc one – CD Volume 2: Studio ===
LP side 1:

1. "Danger Man II" (David Bromberg) – 3:40
2. "Get Up and Go" / fiddle tunes (Bromberg / traditional, arranged by Bromberg) – 4:46
3. "Summer Wages" (Ian Tyson) – 3:53
4. "Dallas Rag" / "Maple Leaf Rag" (arranged by David Laibman / arranged by Bromberg) – 1:43
5. "Whoopee Ti Yi Yo" (traditional, arranged by Bromberg) – 2:55
6. "Young Westley" (Mary McCaslin) – 3:10

LP side 2:

7. "Dyin' Crapshooter's Blues" (Willie McTell) – 3:38
8. "Bluebird" (Bromberg) – 2:09
9. "Idol with a Golden Head" (Jerry Leiber, Mike Stoller) – 3:47
10. "Chubby Thighs" (Steve Burgh) – 4:20
11. "Kaatskill Serenade" (Bromberg) – 4:40

CD bonus tracks:

12. "Kitchen Girl" (traditional) – 2:12
13. "Long Afternoons" (Paul Siebel) – 4:10
14. "Nashville Again" (Siebel) – 3:29

=== LP disc two – CD Volume 1: Live ===
LP side 3:

1. "Sloppy Drunk" (Bromberg) – 4:05
2. "Bullfrog Blues" (Bromberg, Terwilliger) – 16:06

LP side 4:

3. "Sweet Home Chicago" (Robert Johnson) – 3:54
4. "Come On in My Kitchen" (Johnson) – 3:10
5. "Will Not Be Your Fool" (Bromberg) – 7:59
6. "Such a Night" (Mac Rebennack) – 4:41

CD bonus tracks:

7. "Loaded and Laid" (David McKenzie) – 3:19
8. "Make Me a Pallet" (Joe Parish) – 6:07

== Personnel ==
=== Musicians ===
- David Bromberg – electric guitar, acoustic guitar, mandolin, vocals
- Lem Burger – electric guitar
- Steve Burgh – guitar
- Cam and Bert Cheese – electric guitar
- Hank DeVito – pedal steel guitar
- Peter Ecklund – trumpet, mellophone, cornet
- Dick Fegy – electric guitar, banjo, tenor banjo, mandolin
- John Firmin – tenor saxophone, soprano saxophone, baritone saxophone, clarinet
- Le Grand Fromage – guitar, acoustic guitar, vocals
- Nathan Gershman – cello
- Brantley Kearns – fiddle, electric fiddle, mandolin, vocals
- Phil Kearns – vocals
- George Kindler – fiddle
- Bernie Leadon – vocals
- Curt Linberg – trombone
- Hugh McDonald – bass, vocals
- Steve Mosley – drums, vocals
- Alex Nieman – viola
- Herb Pedersen – vocals
- Mac Rebennack – piano
- Jim Rothermel – recorder
- Jane Sharp – vocals
- Phoebe Snow – vocals
- Evan Stover – fiddle

=== Production ===
- Steve Burgh – producer
- David Bromberg – producer
- Phil Kaffel – recording engineer, sides 1 and 2
- Tom Flye – recording engineer, sides 3 and 4
- Rich Ehrman – assistant recording engineer, sides 3 and 4
- Doug Rider – additional recording
- Warren Dewey – remix
- George Tutko – remix assistant
- Lee Hulko – mastering
- Phil Carroll – art direction
- Lance Anderson – design
- Phil Bray – photography
