= Try Me One More Time (album) =

Studio album by David Bromberg
- Released: February 27, 2007
- Genre: Folk, blues
- Length: 47:57
- Label: Appleseed
- Producer: Nancy Josephson

David Bromberg chronology
The Player: A Retrospective (1998)	Try Me One More Time (2007)	Live: New York City 1982 (2008)

Try Me One More Time is an album by David Bromberg. It was released by Appleseed Recordings on February 27, 2007. It was Bromberg's first studio album in almost 18 years, since 1989's Sideman Serenade.

On Try Me One More Time, Bromberg sings and plays acoustic guitar, unaccompanied by other musicians. The tracks include 15 cover tunes, plus one original composition, the title cut.

Try Me One More Time received a 2008 Grammy Award nomination in the category of Best Traditional Folk Album.

== Critical reception ==
Professional ratings
Review scores
Source	Rating
AllMusic	3.5/5 stars
The Music Box	2.5/5 stars

In Rolling Stone, David Fricke wrote enthusiastically, "The fluid, orchestral invention of Bromberg's fingerpicking — his original calling card on pivotal late-Sixties and Seventies sessions for Jerry Jeff Walker ("Mr. Bojangles") and Bob Dylan (New Morning) — is in undiminished bloom, invigorating sturdy old blues and ballads by Robert Johnson, Reverend Gary Davis and Elizabeth Cotten, among others. A recent surprise is Bromberg's singing. His old, shaky rodeo-hand yelp — which had its eccentric charm — has settled into a rippling Fred Neil-like baritone that, when the going gets rough in 'Levee Camp Moan', brings warm, reassuring comfort."

In AllMusic, Jeff Tamarkin was more reserved, saying, "An all-acoustic, solo set of blues and folk tunes... the album feels intimate, honest and earthy, and of course the guitar playing is never less than masterful. But Bromberg hadn't released a new album in a long 17 years when Try Me One More Time hit, and because of that it's an underwhelming return. There is no denying that Bromberg, who basically gave up the road and the studio at the dawn of the '90s in order to become a violin maker, possesses an innate love for the roots Americana that populates his comeback album. And on its own merits, it's a satisfying enough listen — he sounds perfectly comfortable within the familiar domain of this material. But therein lies the disappointment: he's too comfortable.... Bromberg's Delta-style guitar work is, as always, note-perfect (the two instrumentals are a treat and his slide playing is sweet), but fans already know he can do that with his eyes closed."

Writing in The Music Box, John Metzger said, "As anyone who closely follows the acoustic side of the roots music scene is aware, David Bromberg is a severely under-appreciated performer. His skills on guitar, in particular, are remarkable.... It's clear that Bromberg not only has a genuine affinity for the material but also knows its history inside and out. Yet, his heart just doesn't seem to be into it.... Throughout the set, the warm intimacy that is established by his solo arrangements is undone by the lack of passion in his vocals.... Still, there is a quiet beauty that lurks beneath the surface of the collection, and it comes to the forefront on the instrumentals 'Buck Dancer's Choice' and 'Hey Bub'. In the end, though, there's little on Try Me One More Time that leaves much of a lasting impression."

== Track listing ==
1. "Try Me One More Time" (David Bromberg) – 3:14
2. "Kind Hearted Woman" (Robert Johnson) – 3:45
3. "Big Road" (Tommy Johnson) – 2:53
4. "It Takes a Lot to Laugh, It Takes a Train to Cry" (Bob Dylan) – 4:27
5. "Buck Dancer's Choice" (traditional) – 1:52
6. "I Belong to the Band" (Reverend Gary Davis) – 3:32
7. "Moonshiner" (traditional) – 1:27
8. "Shake Sugaree" (Elizabeth Cotten) – 3:09
9. "Hey Bub" (traditional) – 1:35
10. "Love Changing Blues" (Blind Willie McTell) – 3:07
11. "When First unto This Country" (traditional) – 3:01
12. "Levee Camp Moan" (traditional) – 2:16
13. "Trying to Get Home" (Davis) – 3:58
14. "East Virginia" (traditional) – 3:44
15. "Windin' Boy" (traditional) – 3:17
16. "Lonesome Roving Wolves" (traditional) – 1:56

== Personnel ==
Musicians:

- David Bromberg – acoustic guitar, vocals

Production:

- Nancy Josephson – producer; cover art
- Marc Moss – engineer
- David Glasser – mastering
- Rick Neidig – photographs
