= Only Slightly Mad =

Studio album by David Bromberg Band
- Released: September 24, 2013
- Genre: Folk, folk-rock, blues
- Length: 62:03
- Label: Appleseed
- Producer: Larry Campbell

David Bromberg chronology
Use Me (2011)	Only Slightly Mad (2013)	The Blues, the Whole Blues, and Nothing But the Blues (2016)

Only Slightly Mad is an album by the David Bromberg Band. It was released by Appleseed Recordings on September 24, 2013.

Writing about the album in The Philadelphia Inquirer, Steve Klinge said, "Bromberg recorded Only Slightly Mad, released by West Chester's Appleseed Recordings, with producer Larry Campbell, who played guitar in Dylan's touring band from 1997 to 2004, and who now runs the studio of the late Levon Helm. Bromberg originally intended to do an album of Chicago blues-style songs, but at Campbell's encouragement, the project turned into what Bromberg calls 'an old-fashioned David Bromberg album with everything in the world on it.' It's a broad mix of blues, bluegrass, folk, and gospel, mostly originals and a few choice covers, with moments of ironic humor, extemporaneous sermonizing, and deeply personal confessions, including a pair of love songs addressed to his wife, Nancy Josephson, the former leader of the Angel Band."

== Critical reception ==
In American Songwriter, Lee Zimmerman said, "Bromberg doesn't just vary his template, he shakes it up completely. Aside the album's final three selections, all its entries are covers, songs spanning Big Bill Broonzy and Blind Willie Johnson to David Wiffen, Floyd Cramer and Conway Twitty. To his credit, Bromberg manages to take ownership of them all... Other songs find him even farther afield; the fiddle frenzy and mandolin plucking that marks the 'Cattle in the Cane / Forked Deer / Monroe's Hornpipe' medley have him turning towards trad, while 'I'll Rise Again' veers towards gospel, not the most likely route for a good Jewish boy from Philly. Given the album's self-effacing title, Bromberg's ambitions are easily understood. That's part of the reason why Only Slightly Mad is so crazy good."

On Twangville, Bill Wilcox wrote, "For Only Slightly Mad, Bromberg returned to the formula that made his 1970s albums so great — which is to say there is no formula at all. From blues to bluegrass to rhythm and blues, Bromberg does it all, and his new album covers the full range of his musical interests.... It's all old fashioned fun with the humor and musicianship fans came to expect from Bromberg in his prime — a prime that is apparently ongoing."

== Track listing ==
1. "Nobody's Fault but Mine" (Blind Willie Johnson) – 4:46
2. "Keep On Drinkin'" (Big Bill Broonzy, arranged by David Bromberg) – 3:49
3. "Drivin' Wheel" (David Wiffen) – 6:49
4. "I'll Take You Back" (Rick Estrin, Donald Woodruff) – 8:33
5. Medley – 5:07
  - "The Strongest Man Alive" (Bromberg)
  - "Maydelle's Reel" (Kelly Lancaster)
  - "Jenny's Chickens" (Traditional, arranged by Bromberg and Larry Campbell)
6. "Last Date" (Floyd Cramer, Conway Twitty) – 6:18
7. "Nobody Knows the Way I Feel This Mornin'" (Tom Delaney, Pearl Delaney) – 6:35
8. "The Fields Have Turned Brown" (Carter Stanley) – 3:56
9. Medley – 4:42
  - "Cattle in the Cane" (Traditional, arranged by Bromberg)
  - "Forked Deer" (Traditional, arranged by Bromberg)
  - "Monroe's Hornpipe" (Bill Monroe)
10. "I'll Rise Again" (Bromberg) – 3:51
11. "World of Fools" (Bromberg) – 3:18
12. "You've Got to Mean It Too" (Bromberg) – 4:08

== Personnel ==
David Bromberg Band

- David Bromberg – electric guitar, acoustic guitar, mandolin, lead vocals
- Mark Cosgrove – electric guitar, acoustic guitar, mandolin, backing vocals
- Nate Grower – fiddle
- Butch Amiot – bass, backing vocals
- Josh Kanusky – drums
- John Firmin – tenor saxophone, clarinet
- Peter Ecklund – trumpet

Additional musicians

- Larry Campbell – electric guitar, acoustic guitar, pedal steel guitar, National guitar
- Harvey Tibbs – trombone
- Brian Mitchell – keyboards
- John Sebastian – harmonica
- John McEuen – banjo
- Johnny Duke – electric guitar
- John Roberts – vocals
- Tony Barrand – vocals
- Nancy Josephson – vocals
- Kathleen Weber – vocals
- Amy Helm – vocals
- Teresa Williams – vocals

Production

- Produced by Larry Campbell
- Recording and mixing: Justin Guip
- Mastering: Richard Dodd
- Studio assistance: Michael Russo
- Additional engineering: Eric Masse
- Photography: Jim McGuire
- Package layout, design: Christina Galbiati
