= Uncle Earl discography =

Discographies of American artists

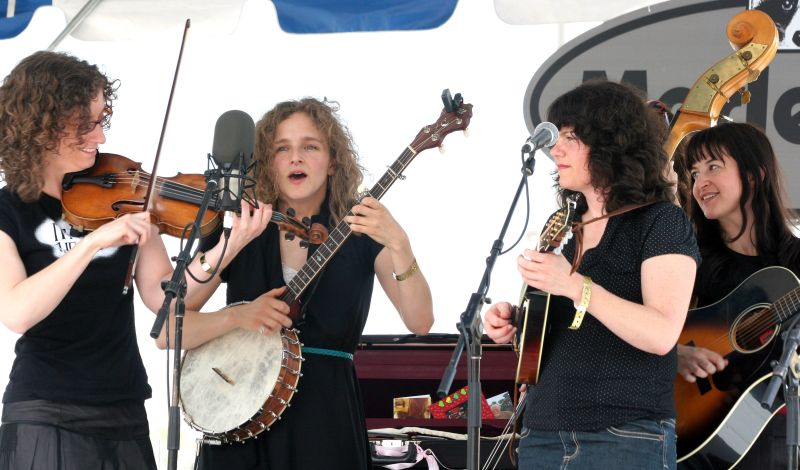
- Studio albums: 2
- EPs: 2

The following is the discography of Uncle Earl, an American folk band. The group has released two EPs and two albums, including 2004's Going to the Western Slope EP and Raise a Ruckus EP, 2005's She Waits for Night album on Rounder Records, and 2007's Waterloo, TN album also on Rounder Records.

== Discography ==
=== Albums ===
She Went Upstairs... - January 2002 (Jo Serrapere)

- Tracks:
1. Charlie He's a Good Ol' Man
2. The Blackest Crow
3. Orphan Train
4. Dream My Girl
5. Rubber Dolly
6. Where the Soul of Man Never Dies
7. Baby
8. Lost Child
9. Over in the Glory Land
10. The Fox
11. Snow White Dove
12. Freight Train

She Waits For Night - July 2005 (Rounder Records)

- Tracks:
1. Walkin' in My Sleep
2. There Is A Time
3. Sugar Babe
4. Warfare
5. Pale Moon
6. Booth Shot Lincoln
7. Willie Taylor
8. Sullivan's Hollow
9. How Long
10. Old Bunch of Keys
11. Sleepy Desert
12. Divine
13. Ida Red
14. Take These Chains

Waterloo, Tennessee - March 2007 (Rounder Records)

- Tracks:
1. Black-Eyed Susie - (trad., arr. Uncle Earl)
2. The Last Goodbye - (Ted Piney & Uncle Earl)
3. One True - (Kristin Andreassen, Eric Merrill & Abigail Washburn)
4. Wish I Had My Time Again - (trad., words & arr. Uncle Earl)
5. My Little Carpenter (trad., arr. Uncle Earl)
6. My Epitaph - (Ola Belle Reed)
7. Buonaparte - (public domain, arr. Uncle Earl)
8. Bony on the Isle of St. Helena - (trad., arr. Uncle Earl)
9. Sisters of the Road - (Rayna Gellert, arr. Uncle Earl)
10. Streak o' Lean, Streak o' Fat (a.k.a. Hongshao Rou) - (music: trad., words: Abigail Washburn & Jon Campbell, arr. Uncle Earl)
11. D & P Blues - (Uncle Earl)
12. The Birds Were Singing of You - (A. P. Carter)
13. Wallflower - (Bob Dylan)
14. Drinker Born - (Rayna Gellert, arr. Uncle Earl)
15. Easy in the Early ('Til Sundown) - (Kristin Andreassen & Uncle Earl)
16. I May Never - (K.C. Groves, Carol Groves & Uncle Earl)

=== EPs ===
Going to the Western Slope-EP - July 2004 (Uncle Earl)

- Tracks:
1. Coffee's Cold - Tater Patch
2. Pale Moon
3. Backstep Cindy
4. Going to the West
5. Coon Dog
6. Keys to the Kingdom

Raise A Ruckus (EP) - December 2004 (Uncle Earl)

- Tracks:
1. Raise a Ruckus
2. Stacker Lee
3. Little Annie
4. Julianne Johnson
5. Walker
6. Keys To The Kingdom
7. The Izze Jingle

== See also ==
- Old-time music
