= Psychedelic Psoul =

Studio album by The Freak Scene
- Released: March 1967
- Recorded: 1967
- Genre: Psychedelic rock
- Length: 31:21
- Label: Columbia
- Producer: Rusty Evans

The Freak Scene chronology
Psychedelic Moods (1966)	Psychedelic Psoul (1967)

Psychedelic Psoul is the sole studio album by the American rock band the Freak Scene released on Columbia Records in March 1967. The album would be the earliest to use the term "psychedelic soul".

== History ==
After the release of the album, Psychedelic Moods, five months prior, lead member Rusty Evans reassembled the studio-only group known as the Deep to expand on the aspects of the previous effort. Among the material, the band included abnormal sound effects, fuzz guitar motifs, and utilization of tape manipulation, which was most relevant on the instrumental piece, "Grok!". In addition, Psychedelic Psoul incorporated Middle-eastern influences, most notably in the tracks "A Million Grains of Sand,” “Rose of Smiling Faces” and “My Rainbow Life", all of which Evans first experimented with while recording the New York rock outfit, the Third Bardo.

Psychedelic Psoul was released in March 1967 on Columbia Records. Since the Freak Scene was one of the few psychedelic musical acts on the label, the release received much more exposure than its predecessor, but, as a consequence of the band not touring to promote it, the album failed to chart. In 2008, Psychedelic Psoul was released on compact disc by P-Vine Records.

== Track listing ==
1. "A Million Grains of Sand - 2:39
2. "...When in the Course of Human Events (Draft Beer, Not Students)" - 1:50
3. "Interpolitation: We Shall Overcome" - 1:44
4. "Rose of Smiling Faces" - 4:16
5. "Behind the Mind" - 2:18
6. "The Subway Ride Thru Inner Space" - 2:43
7. "Butterfly Dream" - 1:38
8. "My Rainbow Life" - 2:51
9. "The Center of My Soul" - 2:26
10. "Watered Down Soul" - 2:37
11. "Red Roses Will Weep" - 2:20
12. "Mind Bender" - 2:28
13. "Grok!" - 1:31

== Personnel ==
Note: The personnel have been identified, but no source confirms all of their roles in the album.

- Rusty Evans - lead vocals, lead guitar
- David Bromberg - rhythm guitar, bass guitar, backing vocals
- Mark Barkan - percussion, backing vocals
- Joseph Keushgenian - drums
- David Richard Blackhurst
- Caroline Blue
- Arthur Geller
- Lenny Pogan
