= Wallflower World Tour =

2015–16 concert tour by Diana Krall

- Tour by Diana Krall
- Associated album: Wallflower
- Start date: February 25, 2015
- End date: July 23, 2016
- Legs: Four
- No. of shows: 55 in North America; 23 in Europe; 6 in Asia; 114 total

Diana Krall concert chronology
- Glad Rag Doll Tour (2012–13); Wallflower World Tour (2015–16); Turn up the Quiet World Tour (2017–18)

The Wallflower World Tour was a concert tour by Canadian singer and songwriter Diana Krall, in support of her twelfth studio album, Wallflower (2015). The tour began in Boston on February 25, 2015, and included dates in North America, Europe, and Asia.

== Personnel ==
- Diana Krall (piano, vocals)
- Anthony Wilson (guitar)
- Dennis Crouch (bass)
- Stuart Duncan (fiddle)
- Karriem Riggins (drums)
- Patrick Warren (keyboards)

== Tour dates ==
Date	City	Country	Venue
First North American leg
February 25, 2015	Boston	United States	Shubert Theatre
February 26, 2015	North Bethesda	United States	Strathmore
February 28, 2015	Atlantic City	United States	Circus Maximus
March 1, 2015	Brookville	United States	Tilles Center
March 2, 2015	Red Bank	United States	Count Basie Theatre
March 4, 2015	Providence	United States	Providence Performing Arts Center
March 5, 2015	Portsmouth	United States	The Music Hall
March 6, 2015	Wallingford	United States	Oakdale Theatre
March 7, 2015	Wilkes-Barre	United States	F.M. Kirby Center
March 10, 2015	Buffalo	United States	Center for the Arts, University at Buffalo
March 11, 2015	Wilmington	United States	Grand Opera House
March 12, 2015	Port Chester	United States	Capitol Theatre
March 14, 2015	New York City	United States	Beacon Theatre
April 2, 2015	Red Bank	United States	Count Basie Theatre
April 6, 2015	West Palm Beach	United States	Kravis Center
April 8, 2015	Tallahassee	United States	Ruby Diamond Auditorium
April 9, 2015	Clearwater	United States	Capitol Theater
April 10, 2015	Clearwater	United States	Capitol Theater
April 12, 2015	Melbourne	United States	King Center
April 13, 2015	Jacksonville	United States	Jacoby Symphony Hall
April 14, 2015	Miami	United States	Adrienne Arsht Center
April 16, 2015	Sarasota	United States	Van Wezel Hall
April 17, 2015	Fort Myers	United States	Barbara Mann Hall
April 19, 2015	Atlanta	United States	Atlanta Symphony Hall
April 20, 2015	Birmingham	United States	Alys Robinson Stephens Center
April 21, 2015	Nashville	United States	Ryman Auditorium
April 23, 2015	North Charleston	United States	North Charleston Coliseum
April 24, 2015	Raleigh	United States	Duke Energy Center
April 25, 2015	Greenville	United States	Peace Center
May 11, 2015	Edmonton	Canada	Northern Alberta Jubilee Auditorium
May 12, 2015	Kelowna	Canada	Prospera Place
May 13, 2015	Vancouver	Canada	Orpheum
May 15, 2015	Calgary	Canada	Southern Alberta Jubilee Auditorium
May 16, 2015	Saskatoon	Canada	TCU Place
May 17, 2015	Regina	Canada	Conexus Arts Centre
May 19, 2015	Winnipeg	Canada	Centennial Concert Hall
May 20, 2015	Thunder Bay	Canada	Thunder Bay Community Auditorium
May 22, 2015	Toronto	Canada	Massey Hall
May 23, 2015	Toronto	Canada	Massey Hall
May 24, 2015	Hamilton	Canada	Hamilton Place Theatre
May 26, 2015	London	Canada	Budweiser Gardens
May 27, 2015	Kitchener	Canada	Centre In The Square
May 29, 2015	Montreal	Canada	Salle Wilfrid-Pelletier
May 30, 2015	Windor	Canada	Caesars Windsor
May 31, 2015	Ottawa	Canada	National Arts Centre
June 2, 2015	Montreal	Canada	Salle Wilfrid-Pelletier
June 19, 2015	Rochester	United States	Kodak Hall at Eastman Theatre
June 21, 2015	Lenox	United States	Koussevitzky Music Shed
July 18, 2015	Cohasset	United States	South Shore Music Circus
July 19, 2015	Hyannis	United States	Cape Cod Melody Tent
July 21, 2015	Binghamton	United States	Anderson Center
July 23, 2015	Pittsburgh	United States	Heinz Hall
July 24, 2015	Philadelphia	United States	Mann Center
July 25, 2015	Vienna	United States	Wolf Trap National Park
July 27, 2015	Knoxville	United States	Tennessee Theatre
July 28, 2015	Louisville	United States	The Kentucky Center
July 30, 2015	Kettering	United States	Fraze Pavilion
August 1, 2015	Interlochen	United States	Interlochen Center for the Arts
August 3, 2015	Grand Rapids	United States	Meijer Gardens
August 4, 2015	Fort Wayne	United States	Embassy Theatre
August 5, 2015	Indianapolis	United States	Clowes Memorial Hall
August 7, 2015	Minneapolis	United States	Orpheum Theatre
August 8, 2015	Milwaukee	United States	Riverside Theater
August 12, 2015	Morrison	United States	Red Rocks Amphitheatre
August 14, 2015	Park City	United States	Newpark Town Center
August 15, 2015	Reno	United States	Grand Sierra Resort
August 16, 2015	Oakland	United States	Fox Oakland Theatre
August 18, 2015	Santa Rosa	United States	Wells Fargo Center for the Arts
August 19, 2015	Saratoga	United States	Mountain Winery
August 21, 2015	Phoenix	United States	Phoenix Symphony Hall
August 22, 2015	Indio	United States	Fantasy Springs Resort Casino
August 23, 2015	Temecula	United States	Pechanga Resort and Casino
August 24, 2015	San Diego	United States	Humphrey's
August 28, 2015	Los Angeles	United States	Hollywood Bowl
August 29, 2015	Los Angeles	United States	Hollywood Bowl
August 30, 2015	Santa Barbara	United States	Santa Barbara Bowl
European leg
September 22, 2015	Madrid	Spain	Barclaycard Center
September 24, 2015	Lisbon	Portugal	MEO Arena
September 26, 2015	Barcelona	Spain	CCIB
September 28, 2015	Birmingham	United Kingdom	Symphony Hall, Birmingham
September 30, 2015	London	United Kingdom	Royal Albert Hall
October 1, 2015	London	United Kingdom	Royal Albert Hall
October 3, 2015	Lyon	France	Amphithéâtre
October 4, 2015	Düsseldorf	Germany	Mitsubishi Electric Halle
October 5, 2015	Hamburg	Germany	Congress Center Hamburg
October 7, 2015	Stuttgart	Germany	Liederhalle
October 8, 2015	Frankfurt	Germany	Alte Oper
October 9, 2015	Rotterdam	Netherlands	De Doelen
October 11, 2015	Brussels	Belgium	Bozar
October 12, 2015	Luxembourg City	Luxembourg	Philharmonie Luxembourg
October 14, 2015	Paris	France	Olympia
October 15, 2015	Paris	France	Olympia
October 16, 2015	Zürich	Switzerland	Hallenstadion
October 18, 2015	Munich	Germany	Gasteig
October 19, 2015	Berlin	Germany	Tempodrom
October 20, 2015	Warsaw	Poland	Torwar Hall
October 21, 2015	Vienna	Austria	Wiener Stadthalle
October 23, 2015	Tbilisi	Georgia	Tbilisi Opera and Ballet Theatre
October 27, 2015	Istanbul	Turkey	Zorlu Center
Second North American leg
November 12, 2015	New Orleans	United States	Saenger Theatre
November 13, 2015	Houston	United States	Hobby Center
November 14, 2015	Grand Prairie	United States	Verizon Theatre
November 15, 2015	Oklahoma City	United States	Civic Center Music Hall
November 17, 2015	San Antonio	United States	Majestic Theatre
November 18, 2015	Austin	United States	Moody Theater
November 19, 2015	Fayetteville	United States	Walton Arts Center
November 21, 2015	Kansas City	United States	Arvest Bank Theatre
December 5, 2015	Costa Mesa	United States	Segerstrom Center
Asian leg
January 24, 2016	Hong Kong	Hong Kong	AsiaWorld–Arena
February 15, 2016	Kuala Lumpur	Malaysia	Petronas Philharmonic Hall
February 16,17, 2016	Singapore	Singapore	Esplanade Concert Hall
February 19, 2016	Bangkok	Thailand	Siam Paragon
February 21, 2016	Seoul	South Korea	Sejong Center
February 24, 2016	Tokyo	Japan	Hitomi Kinen Kōdō
February 25, 2016	Tokyo	Japan	Hitomi Kinen Kōdō
February 29, 2016	Osaka	Japan	Grand Cube
March 2, 2016	Taipei	Taiwan	National Theater & Concert Hall
Second European leg
June 30, 2016	Budapest	Hungary	Béla Bartók National Concert Hall
July 2, 2016	Vienna	Austria	Konzerthaus Wien
July 3, 2016	Prague	Czech Republic	Kongresové centrum
July 6, 2016	Paris	France	L'Olympia
July 8, 2016	Rotterdam	Netherlands	North Sea Jazz Festival
July 9, 2016	Perugia	Italy	Umbria Jazz Festival
July 11, 2016	Naples	Italy	Arena Flegrea
July 19, 2016	Sète	France	Théâtre de la Mer
July 22, 2016	Lisbon	Portugal	Campo Pequeno
July 23, 2016	Porto	Portugal	Porto Multiusos de Gondomar

== Set list ==
=== Regular appearance ===
1. "We Just Couldn't Say Goodbye"
2. "There Ain't No Sweet Man That's Worth the Salt of My Tears"
3. "Just Like a Butterfly That's Caught in the Rain"
4. "On the Sunny Side of the Street"
5. "So Nice"
6. "East of the Sun (and West of the Moon)"
7. "Temptation"
8. "Let's Face the Music and Dance"
9. "The Frim-Fram Sauce"
10. "A Case of You"
11. "Exactly Like You"
12. "Wallflower"
13. "If I Take You Home Tonight"
14. "Desperado"

=== Occasional appearance/Encore ===
1. "Let It Rain"
2. "How Deep Is the Ocean?"
3. "You Call It Madness"
4. "'S Wonderful"
5. "I've Got You Under My Skin"
6. "Wide River to Cross"
7. "'Deed I Do"
8. "Boulevard of Broken Dreams"
