= Psychedelic soul =

Music genre

- Other names: Black rock; psychedelic funk
- Stylistic origins: Soul; psychedelic rock; rhythm and blues
- Cultural origins: Mid to late 1960s, United States
- Derivative forms: Funk rock; cinematic soul; neo-psychedelia; disco

Other topics
- Progressive soul; psychedelic funk; psychedelic pop

Psychedelic soul (originally called black rock or conflated with psychedelic funk) is a form of soul music which emerged in the United States in the late 1960s. The style saw African-American soul musicians embrace elements of psychedelic rock, including its production techniques, instrumentation, effects units such as wah-wah and phasing, and drug influences. It came to prominence in the late 1960s and continued into the 1970s, playing a major role in the development of funk and disco.

Pioneering acts working in the genre included Sly and the Family Stone, Isaac Hayes, the Temptations, the Chambers Brothers, and Parliament-Funkadelic.

== Etymology ==
In 1967, New York band the Freak Scene used the phrase "psychedelic soul" as the title of their debut album, Psychedelic Psoul, stylized as "psoul". However, the term "psychedelic soul" to refer to a style of music would be coined the following year in 1968. In 1972, British magazine Beat Instrumental wrote a piece on the Temptations, stating that when Dennis Edwards replaced David Ruffin in 1968, the group began branching out into "what was then christened 'psychedelic soul' by the media."

== History ==
=== Origins ===
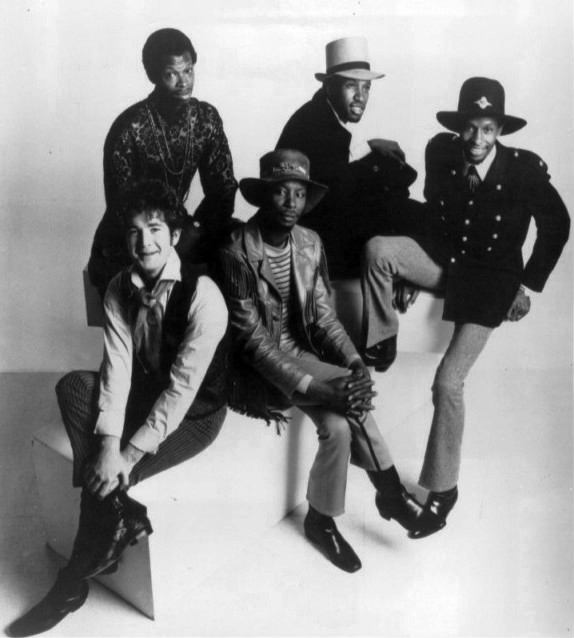
The Chambers Brothers in 1970

Following the lead of Jimi Hendrix as he moved from soul to psychedelic rock, the psychedelic subculture of the 1960s began to have a widespread impact on African-American musicians, particularly the stars of the Motown label. Influenced by the civil rights movement, this style had a darker and more political edge than much contemporary psychedelic rock. The Temptations and their producer Norman Whitfield moved from a relatively light vocal group into more hard-edged and topical material like "Cloud Nine" (1968), "Runaway Child, Running Wild" (1969), and "Psychedelic Shack" (1969). Sly and the Family Stone also helped pioneer the sound with songs like "Dance to the Music" (1968), "Everyday People" (1968) and "I Want to Take You Higher" (1969), which combined psychedelic rock with funk and emphasized distorted electric guitar and strong basslines.

=== Relationship with Afrofuturism ===
Afrofuturism is an artistic movement that envisions creative black futures where black people are thriving leaders often involving science fiction and fantasy. Psychedelic soul arose in the 1960s during the Civil Rights Movement and cultural upheaval allowed black people to think about futures different from the ones that already existed. Afrofuturism was embedded in some of the earliest examples of psychedelic soul, particularly in George Clinton’s Parliament Funkadelic. Clinton's alter ego was named Star-Child and the band was known for its outer space imagery, both in the music and on stage. Contemporary artists like Janelle Monáe carry on the legacy of Afrofuturism in psychedelic soul with albums like Dirty Computer, which adds themes of gender and sexuality to the genre’s original themes of race, technology, and identity.

=== Development ===
Other Motown acts soon followed into psychedelic territory, including the Supremes with "Reflections" (1967), "Love Child" (1968), and "Stoned Love" (1970). Psychedelic influences could also be heard in the early 1970s work of Stevie Wonder and Marvin Gaye's 1971 album What's Going On. Acts that broke through with psychedelic soul included the Chambers Brothers with "Time Has Come Today" (1966, but charting in 1968), Arthur Brown with "Fire" (1968), the 5th Dimension with a cover of Laura Nyro's "Stoned Soul Picnic" (1968), Edwin Starr with "War" (1970), and the Undisputed Truth with "Smiling Faces Sometimes" (1971).

George Clinton's interdependent Funkadelic and Parliament ensembles and their various spin-offs took influence from Detroit rock groups including MC5 and the Stooges, using extended distorted guitar solos and psychedelic sound effects coupled with surreal imagery and stage antics forming part of an Afrofuturist overarching mythology, leading to three US top ten singles, and three platinum albums. Shuggie Otis' 1974 album Inspiration Information emerged too late to take advantage of the style's peak of popularity, but later found acclaim when it was reissued in 2001.

=== Decline and influence ===
While psychedelic rock began to waver at the end of the 1960s, psychedelic soul's popularity continued into the 1970s and declined only towards the end of the decade. Isaac Hayes and Curtis Mayfield added orchestral instrumentation to psychedelic soul, creating a style known as cinematic soul which became a predecessor to disco. Artists which began in psychedelic soul such as Earth, Wind & Fire, Kool & the Gang, and the Ohio Players incorporated its sounds into funk and disco.

=== Modern artists ===
Nicknamed the Queen of Neo Soul, Erykah Badu is influenced by R&B, soul, and hip-hop genres. She won BET’s Video of the Year award in 2003 and the Grammy Award for Best R&B Album in 1998, among many others, and she remains a notable soul influence for many musicians today.

Bilal Sayeed Oliver rose to fame with his popular R&B single “Soul Sista” and attended The New School for Jazz and Contemporary Music in New York City . Led by

Eric Burton, the Black Pumas are an American psychedelic soul band and have been nominated seven times for a Grammy Award .

Janelle Monáe Robinson is well known for her futuristic approach to R&B and soul music, drawing on Afrofuturism and funk influences throughout her work. She has received multiple Grammy Award nominations, including Best Contemporary R&B Album, Album of the Year as a featured artist, and Best Urban/Alternative Performance, just to name a few .

Adrian Younge is an American composer and producer known for his soul sound infused with jazz and hip-hop. He has collaborated with artists such as Kendrick Lamar, Ghostface Killah, and Ali Shaheed Muhammad. He is the founder of the record label Linear Labs and continues to shape modern soul through his innovative production style .

Kali Uchis is well known for her blend of soul, R&B, and Latin pop. She first gained attention with her breakout EP Por Vida and her collaborations with artists like Tyler the Creator. She has won a Grammy Award for Best Dance/Electronic Recording, earned multiple chart-topping songs in both English and Spanish, and is recognized today as a global pop-soul musician .

== See also ==
- Category:Psychedelic soul songs
- Psychedelic pop
- Neo-psychedelia
- Black Rock Coalition
- Afro-punk
- Black Music Project
- Psychedelic Soul: 10 of the best
