= Stealin', Stealin =

"Stealin', Stealin'"

Single by Memphis Jug Band
- A-side: "Whitewash Station Blues"
- Released: 1929
- Recorded: September 15, 1928
- Studio: Memphis, Tennessee
- Genre: Blues
- Label: Victor
- Songwriter: Will Shade

"Stealin" (also called "Stealin', Stealin'") is an American blues song from the 1920s. It originated with jug bands, but gained wider popularity after several 1960s contemporary folk musicians recorded it. Although various artists have recorded different verses, the chorus has remained consistent:

Stealin', stealin', pretty mama don't you tell on me
I'm stealin' back to my same old used to be

== Origins ==
The lines "If you don’t believe I love you, look what a fool I’ve been / If you don’t believe I’d fall for you, look what a hole I’m in" were recorded by the New Orleans jazz musician Clarence Williams in 1921 and again by Leona Williams in 1922 as "If You Don't Believe I Love You, Look What a Fool I've Been".

Gus Cannon claimed to have written the opening line, "Put your arms around me like a circle 'round the sun". Consequently, Cannon is sometimes credited with authorship of the song. However, this line does not appear in any of his recorded songs, but does appear in the folk song "I Know You Rider" and may actually predate Cannon. "She's a married woman, but she comes to see me all the time" is another lyric associated with Gus Cannon, which appeared in his "Minglewood Blues" recorded January 30, 1928.

== Memphis Jug Band ==
The song was first recorded by the Memphis Jug Band as "Stealin', Stealin'". The recording session took place on September 15, 1928, in Memphis, Tennessee, and featured Will Shade on harmonica, Charlie Burse lead vocal and guitar, Ben Ramey on harmony vocal and kazoo, and Jab Jones on jug. Victor Records released it as a single in 1929, with Shade listed as the songwriter. The song is included on several compilation albums.

== Grateful Dead ==
"Stealin'" was recorded by the San Francisco, California-based psychedelic rock band the Grateful Dead early in their career. Known as the "Scorpio Sessions", a limited release in July 1966 by Scorpio Records included Henry Thomas's "Don't Ease Me In". On October 21, 2002, the sessions appeared on the band's twelve-CD box set The Golden Road (1965-1973).

Jerry Garcia also recorded the song with friend and collaborator David Grisman, which appeared on the album Shady Grove in 1996, and on the compilation album, Acoustic Disc 100% Handmade Music, Volume 3 in 1997.. Grisman's son Sam Grisman in turn recorded it as the first track on the album Temple Cabin Sessions Vol. I in 2023.

== Album appearances ==
- Dave Van Ronk and the Ragtime Jug Stompers, Dave Van Ronk, 1960
- Great White Wonder II, Bob Dylan, 1970
- Little Games, the Yardbirds, 1967
- Running Down the Road, Arlo Guthrie, 1969 (also appears in the 1971 film Two-Lane Blacktop)
- Reckless Abandon, The David Bromberg Band, 1977
- Temple Cabin Sessions Volume I, Sam Grisman Project, 2023
