= Psychedelic Moods =

Studio album by The Deep
- Released: November 1966
- Recorded: August 19–20, 1966
- Studio: Cameo-Parkway Studios, Philadelphia, PA
- Genre: Psychedelic rock; garage rock
- Length: 29:43
- Label: Cameo-Parkway
- Producer: The Deep, Mark Barkan

The Deep chronology
Psychedelic Moods (1966)	Psychedelic Psoul (1967)

Psychedelic Moods is the debut album by American rock band The Deep released on Cameo-Parkway Records in November 1966. The album included guitarist David Bromberg and was later recognized as one of the earliest albums to use the term "psychedelic" in its title.

== Background ==
In 1966, musician Rusty Evans, who had originally been a rockabilly singer and a member of the Greenwich Village folk revival scene, was inspired by the San Francisco sound and their psychedelic posters to produce an album centered on the psychedelic experience. Evans pitched the idea to Mark Barkan, who accepted, leading to the formation of a studio-only group called the Deep, which included guitarist David Bromberg. Shortly afterwards, Barkan had the band signed to Cameo-Parkway Records to record the album, where they became labelmates to Question Mark and The Mysterians. The album, released in November 1966, was one of the earliest to include the word "psychedelic" in its title. This was around the same time as the Blues Magoos' Psychedelic Lollipop, but came after the 13th Floor Elevators' The Psychedelic Sounds of the 13th Floor Elevators, which had been released in October.

== Recording and production ==
The Deep completed the album in its entirety at Cameo-Parkway Studios, Philadelphia in a two-day process that commenced on August 19, and concluded on August 20, 1966. On a budget of $1,200, a considerably lower margin than what was usually funded for a typical album, the band co-produced the sessions with Barkan. From New York City, the Deep traveled to Philadelphia to record the album. Six songs were previously written before the move, with six additional compositions being penned along the way to the studio to provide enough material for a full LP. Recording took place in a darkened studio, reportedly while the group was under the influence of LSD. Numerous sound effects were utilized, the overall sound of the tracks have been described as "very strange, full of weird sound effects, haunting vocals, and acid-soaked lyrics". With the sessions becoming increasingly erratic, the drummer unexpectedly departed, but the instrumentals were complete, so further drum tracks did not have to be recorded. Following the drummer's exit, fuzz reverse guitar, chimes, and abnormal bullfrog sounds were overdubbed onto the tracks.

== Critical reception ==
Professional ratings
Review scores
Source	Rating
AllMusic	2.5/5 stars

Psychedelic Moods (subtitled A Mind Expanding Phenomena) was released in November 1966. In a retrospective review, Richie Unterberger stated "It's hard to tell whether these sessions -- replete with fuzzy guitars, hallucinatory (and often silly) free-association lyrics, and ominous melodies -- were intended seriously or not. Occasional folk-rock-ish tunes (some with male-female vocal duets) offer respite from the general chaos of some not untalented musicians doing their best to be psychedelically wild and crazy. Collectors should be aware that the version of the best song, "Trip #76," included here is for some reason much thinner and worse than the one issued on the psychedelic reissue compilation Echoes of Time."

Following the completion of the album, Barkan's lawyer sent the tapes to Dick James, publisher of The Beatles. James made an offer for the rights to distribute the album, but the band declined on the assumption it would become a hit. Upon release, Psychedelic Moods failed to achieve the success the band anticipated. The lack of copies sold was, in part, due to the unforeseen success of Question Mark and the Mysterians' hit, "96 Tears", and Cameo-Parkway Records' poor circulation of the album.

Collectables Records re-released the album in 1996 as a part of a series of outtakes, and previously unreleased material focusing on the Deep.

== Track listing ==
All tracks are written by The Deep.

No.	Title	Length
1.	"Color Dreams"	2:39
2.	"Pink Ether"	2:23
3.	"When Rain Is Black"	2:13
4.	"It's All a Part of Me"	2:57
5.	"Turned On"	2:28
6.	"Psychedelic Moon"	2:45
7.	"Shadows on the Wall"	3:15
8.	"Crystal Nite"	1:43
9.	"Trip #76"	2:39
10.	"Wake Up and Find Me"	2:22
11.	"Your Choice to Choose"	1:55
12.	"On Off – Off On"	2:24
Total length:		29:43

== Personnel ==
Note: The personnel have been identified, but no source confirms all of their roles in the album.

- Rusty Evans - lead vocals, lead guitar
- David Bromberg - rhythm guitar, bass guitar, backing vocals
- Mark Barkan - percussion, backing vocals
- David Richard Blackhurst
- Caroline Blue
- Arthur Geller
- Lenny Pogan
