= Reckless Abandon (David Bromberg album) =

Studio album by David Bromberg Band
- Released: 1977
- Genre: Folk rock
- Label: Fantasy
- Producer: Jim Price

David Bromberg chronology
How Late'll Ya Play 'Til? (1976)	Reckless Abandon (1977)	Out of the Blues: The Best of David Bromberg (1977)

Reckless Abandon is a folk rock album by American musician David Bromberg. His sixth album, it was released by Fantasy Records as a vinyl LP in 1977. It was released by Fantasy on CD in 1998, combined with Bromberg's subsequent album, Bandit in a Bathing Suit.

The panel cartoon album cover was drawn by B. Kliban.

== Critical reception ==
Professional ratings
Review scores
Source	Rating
Allmusic	3/5 stars

On Allmusic, William Ruhlmann wrote, "By billing this album to the David Bromberg Band, Bromberg signals that the listener can expect to hear more than just his adenoidal voice and variety of acoustic instruments. But then, that just means it's as eclectic as most David Bromberg albums. The lead-off track "I Want to Go Home" has a blues-rock feel; horns wail into a Dixieland swarm during the old folk tune "Stealin'"; and then comes a medley of old-timey country tunes played on banjo, mandolin, and guitar. That's just the first three tracks..."

Audio magazine said, "Reckless Abandon demonstrates David's ever-growing confidence and improvement as vocalist and bandleader. Despite [some] flaws, this is still his best-recorded and best-played studio effort."

== Track listing ==
Side one

1. "I Want to Go Home" (David Bromberg) – 3:06
2. "Stealin' (Gus Cannon) – 3:50
3. Medley – 3:03
  - "Sally Goodin" (Traditional, arranged by Bromberg)
  - "Old Joe Clark" (Traditional, arranged by Bromberg)
  - "Wheel Hoss" (Bill Monroe)
4. "Child's Song" (Murray McLauchlan) – 4:42
5. "Mrs. Delion's Lament" (Jim Ringer) – 4:28

Side two

1. Medley – 3:16
  - "Battle of Bull Run" (source Frank Warner, arranged by Bromberg)
  - "Paddy on the Turnpike" (Traditional, arranged by Dick Fegy)
  - "Rover's Fancy" (Traditional, arranged by Bromberg)
2. "What a Town" (Rick Danko, Bobby Charles) – 3:17
3. "Baby Breeze" (Bromberg, Hugh McDonald, Heard) – 3:01
4. "Beware, Brother Beware" (Morry Lasco, Dick Adams, Fleecie Moore) – 7:36
5. "Nobody's Fault but Mine" (Blind Willie Johnson) – 3:48

== Personnel ==
David Bromberg Band

- David Bromberg – guitar, electric guitar, slide guitar, dobro, mandolin, vocals
- Dick Fegy – guitar, electric guitar, mandolin, banjo, violin
- George Kindler – violin, mandolin
- Curt Linberg – trombone
- John Firmin – tenor saxophone, clarinet, piccolo, pennywhistle
- Hugh McDonald – bass, vocals
- Lance Dickerson – drums, vocals

Additional musicians

- Steve Madaio – trumpet
- Chuck Findley – trumpet
- Darrell Leonard – trumpet
- Trevor Lawrence – tenor saxophone
- Jim Price – trombone, vocals
- Peggy Sandvig – piano
- Steve Forman – percussion
- Daniel Moore – vocals
- Matthew Moore – vocals

Production

- Produced by Jim Price
- Music arranged by Jim Price and David Bromberg
- Engineering: Joe Tuzen
- Additional engineering: Steve Williams, Carla Frederick, Steve Barncard, Matt Hyde, Phil Kaffel, Skip Taylor
- Mastering: John Golden
- Cover art: B. Kliban
- Art direction: Phil Carroll
