= Wallflower (Diana Krall album) =

Studio album by Diana Krall
- Released: February 3, 2015
- Recorded: mid-2014.
- Studios: AIR (London) (Note: Orchestra); Verve (Santa Monica, California; Capitol (Hollywood) (Note: Additional recording); MSR (New York City); Soundtrade (Solna, Sweden); The Village (West Los Angeles); The Orange Lounge (Toronto); Creekside (West Vancouver)
- Genre: Jazz
- Length: 45:14
- Label: Verve
- Producer: David Foster

Diana Krall chronology
Glad Rag Doll (2012)	Wallflower (2015)	Turn Up the Quiet (2017)

Wallflower is the twelfth studio album by Canadian singer Diana Krall, released on February 3, 2015, by Verve Records. The album was produced by David Foster. The album's supporting tour, Wallflower World Tour, began in Boston on February 25, 2015.

== Recording ==
The album consists of cover songs of various pop and rock songs, the only previously unreleased track being "If I Take You Home Tonight" by Paul McCartney. He wrote the song for his album Kisses on the Bottom, in which he collaborated with Krall. Although the song did not make the cut for that album, Krall asked McCartney if she could record the song, and he gave his consent.

== Critical reception ==
Professional ratings
Aggregate scores
Source	Rating
Metacritic	58/100
Review scores
Source	Rating
AllMusic	3.5/5 stars
American Songwriter	2.5/5 stars
The Daily Telegraph	3/5 stars
Financial Times	2/5 stars
The National	3/5 stars
PopMatters	3/10
Rolling Stone	3/5 stars
Spectrum Culture	3.5/5 stars
Stuff.co.nz	3.5/5 stars
The Times of India	3/5

Wallflower received mixed reviews from music critics. At Metacritic, which assigns a normalized rating out of 100 to reviews from mainstream publications, the album received an average score of 58, based on 10 reviews.

Neil McCormick of The Daily Telegraph stated, "It is a lovely Valentine record, if you favour melancholic songs about missed chances. The set feels overfamiliar, though, drawing heavily on classic Seventies ballads by the Carpenters, Eagles, Elton John and 10CC. A moodily evocative reading of a gorgeous new Paul McCartney song, "I'll Take You Home Tonight", suggests this album might have been more interesting if Krall had dared to take the middle-of-the-road less travelled".

Jim Farber of the New York Daily News wrote, "Wallflower breaks another pattern for Krall. It eschews her frequent focus on American standards. But the sexiness and spring she brought to the best of those covers rarely comes into play here".

== Commercial performance ==
Wallflower debuted at number two on the Canadian Albums Chart, selling 13,000 copies in its first week. By January 2016, the album had sold 66,000 copies in Canada.

In the United States, it entered the Billboard 200 at number 10 with first-week sales of 44,000 copies, becoming Krall's sixth top-10 album on the chart. The album debuted at number 19 on the UK Albums Chart with 3,511 copies sold in its first week.

== Track listing ==
No.	Title	Writer(s)	Original artist	Length
1.	"California Dreamin'"	John Phillips; Michelle Phillips	The Mamas & the Papas	3:17
2.	"Desperado"	Don Henley; Glenn Frey	Eagles	3:32
3.	"Superstar"	Bonnie Bramlett; Leon Russell	Delaney & Bonnie	4:16
4.	"Alone Again (Naturally)" (duet with Michael Bublé)	Gilbert O'Sullivan	Gilbert O'Sullivan	3:50
5.	"Wallflower" (featuring Blake Mills)	Bob Dylan	Doug Sahm	3:05
6.	"If I Take You Home Tonight"	Paul McCartney	Diana Krall	3:52
7.	"I Can't Tell You Why"	Timothy B. Schmit; Henley; Frey	Eagles	3:40
8.	"Sorry Seems to Be the Hardest Word"	Elton John; Bernard Taupin	Elton John	4:11
9.	"Operator (That's Not the Way It Feels)"	Jim Croce	Jim Croce	3:41
10.	"I'm Not in Love"	Graham Gouldman; Eric Stewart	10cc	3:52
11.	"Feels Like Home" (duet with Bryan Adams)	Randy Newman	Linda Ronstadt	4:21
12.	"Don't Dream It's Over"	Neil Finn	Crowded House	3:37
Total length:				45:14

Deluxe edition bonus tracks
No.	Title	Writer(s)	Original artist	Length
13.	"In My Life"	John Lennon; McCartney	The Beatles	3:53
14.	"Yeh, Yeh" (duet with Georgie Fame)	Rodgers Grant; Pat Patrick; Jon Hendricks	Georgie Fame and the Blue Flames	3:08
15.	"Sorry Seems to Be the Hardest Word" (live)	John; Taupin	Elton John	3:44
16.	"Wallflower" (live)	Dylan	Doug Sahm	3:09
Total length:				59:08

Wallflower: The Complete Sessions bonus tracks
No.	Title	Writer(s)	Original artist	Length
17.	"A Case of You"	Joni Mitchell	Joni Mitchell	4:55
18.	"If You Could Read My Mind" (featuring Sarah McLachlan)	Gordon Lightfoot	Gordon Lightfoot	3:44
19.	"Everybody's Talkin'" (featuring Vince Gill)	Fred Neil	Fred Neil	3:36
20.	"Heart of Gold"	Neil Young	Neil Young	2:51
Total length:				74:14

== Personnel ==
Credits adapted from the liner notes of the deluxe edition of Wallflower.

=== Musicians ===
- Diana Krall – vocals (all tracks); piano (tracks 1, 5, 7, 15, 16)
- David Foster – orchestra arrangements (tracks 1–4, 6–11, 13); keyboards (tracks 1, 3, 12, 15); piano (tracks 2, 4, 6, 8–11, 13); string quartet arrangements (tracks 5, 16); horn arrangements (track 14); arrangements (all tracks)
- William Ross – orchestra arrangements (tracks 1–3, 6–11, 13)
- Graham Nash – background vocals (tracks 1, 9)
- Stephen Stills – background vocals (tracks 1, 9); electric guitar (track 9)
- Christian McBride – bass (tracks 1, 3, 7, 10, 11, 14)
- Ramón Stagnaro – acoustic guitar (tracks 1, 7, 9)
- Michael Thompson – EBow electric guitar (track 1); acoustic guitar (tracks 9, 11); electric guitar (tracks 10, 14); guitars (track 12)
- Jochem van der Saag – synths (tracks 1, 3, 7, 10–12); programming (tracks 1, 3, 4, 6–8, 10–12, 14); sound design (tracks 1, 3, 4, 6, 7, 10–12, 14)
- Karriem Riggins – drums (tracks 3, 7, 9)
- Michael Bublé – vocals (track 4)
- Chris Walden – orchestra arrangements (track 4); string quartet arrangements (tracks 5, 16)
- Dennis Crouch – bass (tracks 4, 9)
- Jim Keltner – drums (tracks 4, 6, 10–12)
- Dean Parks – guitars (tracks 4, 6)
- Blake Mills – guitar (track 5)
- Nathan East – bass (track 6)
- Timothy B. Schmit – background vocals (track 7)
- Rafael Padilla – percussion (track 7)
- Bryan Adams – vocals (track 11)
- Vince Mendoza – orchestra arrangements (track 12)
- Georgie Fame – vocals (track 14)
- Jerry Hey – horn arrangements (track 14)
- Joey DeFrancesco – B-3 organ (track 14)
- Steve Jordan – drums (track 14)
- Sean Billings – trumpet (track 14)
- Matt DeMerritt – tenor saxophone (track 14)
- Chris Lea – tenor saxophone (track 14)
- Elizabeth Lea – trombone (track 14)
- Gavin Greenaway – orchestra conducting
- Susie Gillis – orchestra conducting assistance
- Everton Nelson – orchestra leader

=== Technical ===
- David Foster – production
- Jochem van der Saag – co-production, mixing, engineering
- Jorge Vivo – recording, engineering
- Steve Price – orchestra recording
- Steve Genewick – Pro Tools, engineering assistance
- Roy Henderickson – recording engineering
- Daniel Fyfe – recording engineering assistance
- Anders Pantzer – recording engineering
- Chris Owens – engineering assistance
- Spencer Sunshine – recording engineering
- Chris Parker – engineering
- Paul Forgues – engineering assistance
- Guillame Dujardin – engineering
- Andreas Carlsson – production (Georgie Fame vocals)
- Hank Linderman – recording (Timothy B. Schmit vocals)
- Nuno Fernandes – recording (Bryan Adams vocals)
- Adam Miller – Pro Tools engineering
- Paul Blakemore – mastering

=== Artwork ===
- Coco Shinomiya – design
- Mr. Fotheringham – illustration
- Bryan Adams – photography

== Charts ==
=== Weekly charts ===
Chart (2015)	Peak position
Australian Albums (ARIA)	7
Australian Jazz & Blues Albums (ARIA)	1
Austrian Albums (Ö3 Austria)	5
Belgian Albums (Ultratop Flanders)	7
Belgian Albums (Ultratop Wallonia)	5
Canadian Albums (Billboard)	2
Croatian Albums (HDU)	7
Czech Albums (ČNS IFPI)	6
Danish Albums (Hitlisten)	10
Dutch Albums (Album Top 100)	7
French Albums (SNEP)	4
German Albums (Offizielle Top 100)	9
Greek Albums (IFPI)	6
Hungarian Albums (MAHASZ)	1
Irish Albums (IRMA)	29
Italian Albums (FIMI)	9
Japanese Albums (Oricon)	19
New Zealand Albums (RMNZ)	9
Norwegian Albums (VG-lista)	4
Polish Albums (ZPAV)	2
Portuguese Albums (AFP)	1
Scottish Albums (Official Charts)	24
South Korean Albums (Gaon)	48
Spanish Albums (Promusicae)	1
Swedish Albums (Sverigetopplistan)	33
Swedish Jazz Albums (Sverigetopplistan)	1
Swiss Albums (Schweizer Hitparade)	5
UK Albums (Official Charts)	19
US Billboard 200	10
US Top Jazz Albums (Billboard)	1
US Traditional Jazz Albums (Billboard)	1

=== Year-end charts ===
Chart (2015)	Position
Australian Jazz & Blues Albums (ARIA)	1
Austrian Albums (Ö3 Austria)	63
Belgian Albums (Ultratop Flanders)	103
Belgian Albums (Ultratop Wallonia)	76
Canadian Albums (Billboard)	26
French Albums (SNEP)	53
German Albums (Offizielle Top 100)	74
Hungarian Albums (MAHASZ)	48
New Zealand Albums (RMNZ)	44
South Korean International Albums (Circle)	39
Spanish Albums (PROMUSICAE)	45
US Top Jazz Albums (Billboard)	2

Chart (2016)	Position
Australian Jazz & Blues Albums (ARIA)	9
US Top Jazz Albums (Billboard)	18

Chart (2017)	Position
Australian Jazz & Blues Albums (ARIA)	20

Chart (2018)	Position
Australian Jazz & Blues Albums (ARIA)	40

Chart (2019)	Position
Australian Jazz & Blues Albums (ARIA)	42

== Certifications ==
Region	Certification	Certified units/sales
Austria (IFPI Austria)	Gold	7,500^{*}
Canada (Music Canada)	Platinum	80,000^{^}
Poland (ZPAV)	2× Platinum	40,000^{‡}
Spain (Promusicae)	Gold	20,000^{‡}
^{*} Sales figures based on certification alone.^{^} Shipments figures based on certification alone.^{‡} Sales+streaming figures based on certification alone.
