= Woodsmoke and Oranges =

Studio album by Paul Siebel
- Released: October 1970
- Recorded: 1970
- Genre: Folk rock/Country rock
- Length: 35:08
- Label: Elektra (74064), Philo (PH1161)
- Producer: Peter K. Siegel

Paul Siebel chronology
| Woodsmoke and Oranges (1970) | Jack-Knife Gypsy (1971) |

Woodsmoke and Oranges is the debut album from folk rock/country rock musician Paul Siebel. The album contains his tune "Louise" which was later recorded by Linda Ronstadt, Ian Matthews, Bonnie Raitt, Eric Andersen, Jerry Jeff Walker, Leo Kottke, and others.

== Reception ==
Professional ratings
Review scores
| Source | Rating |
|---|---|
| AllMusic | 5/5 stars |

Music critic Ronnie D. Lankford, Jr. wrote in his Allmusic ""Siebel and company crafted an incredible record that still sounds vibrant 30 years after the fact. Although he'd never outdo his work on Woodsmoke and Oranges, few artists ever craft an album this good."

== Reissues ==
- Woodsmoke and Oranges was reissued on CD with some of Jack-Knife Gypsy by Rounder/Philo in 1995.
- Woodsmoke and Oranges was reissued on CD with Jack-Knife Gypsy by WEA International in 2004. The disc also has a previously unreleased song, "Nervous".
- Woodsmoke and Oranges was reissued on CD with Jack-Knife Gypsy and two bonus cuts by Beat Goes On in 2020. The two bonus cuts are short interviews that were previously released on a 45 to radio stations only when "Woodsmoke And Oranges" came out, titled "Up 'Til Now" and "From Here On In".

== Track listing ==
All songs by Paul Siebel.

1. "She Made Me Lose My Blues" – 2:36
2. "Miss Cherry Lane" – 2:52
3. "Nashville Again" – 3:13
4. "Ballad of Honest Sam" – 4:20
5. "Then Came the Children" – 4:10
6. "Louise" – 3:40
7. "Bride 1945" – 3:32
8. "My Town" – 3:12
9. "Any Day Woman" – 3:02
10. "Long Afternoons" – 4:21

== Personnel ==
- Paul Siebel - acoustic guitar, 12-string guitar, vocals
- David Bromberg - dobro, acoustic guitar, electric guitar
- Weldon Myrick - pedal steel guitar
- Richard Greene - violin
- Gary White - bass
- Jeff Gutcheon - organ, piano
- Don Brooks - harmonica
- James Madison - drums

== Production ==
- Producer: Peter K. Siegel
- Recording Engineer: Dave Sanders, Shelly Yakus
- Art Direction: William S. Harvey
- Photography: Robert Campbell
