= The Blues, the Whole Blues, and Nothing But the Blues =

Studio album by the David Bromberg Band
- Released: October 14, 2016
- Genre: Blues
- Length: 57:51
- Label: Red House
- Producer: Larry Campbell

David Bromberg chronology
Only Slightly Mad (2013)	The Blues, the Whole Blues, and Nothing But the Blues (2016)	Big Road (2020)

The Blues, the Whole Blues, and Nothing But the Blues is an album by the David Bromberg Band. It was released by Red House Records on October 14, 2016.

The album contains thirteen blues songs – eleven covers and two originals – performed in a wide variety of styles. David Bromberg sings and plays electric and acoustic guitar. He is accompanied by Mark Cosgrove (electric guitar, mandolin), Nate Grower (fiddle), Butch Amiot (bass guitar), and Josh Kanusky (drums). Some of the tracks also feature various guest musicians, including Bill Payne on keyboards, Lou Marini on saxophone, Steve Bernstein on trumpet, Birch Johnson on trombone, and Larry Campbell, who served as the album's producer, on acoustic guitar.

== Critical reception ==
In PopMatters, Ed Whitelock wrote, "The album is a master-class in blues-oriented Americana as Bromberg and his accompanists bring to life a collection of 11 smartly chosen covers and two Bromberg originals that fit seamlessly into the flow.... The precision of the players and the interplay of instruments gives them the freedom to move from the country blues of the Mississippi Delta to the jug band tradition of the urban South, and from New Orleans to Chicago, embracing the breadth of American music in its myriad places and times."

In Glide magazine, Lee Zimmerman said, "David Bromberg’s fondness for the blues has been a single-minded concern throughout his storied career, one that’s found him working alongside any number of icons, folks like Bob Dylan and George Harrison included.... Of course, it’s Bromberg’s fretwork, the chief reason he’s racked up his reputation, that takes center stage. He’s not always a flashy player, but relies instead on a tasteful tack that ensures his distinction."

The Associated Press wrote, "Bromberg has never sung better, his wise, warm warble enhanced by masterful timing and droll wit. His guitar still gets its licks in, too... Arrangements are tight and the mood is loose as the group covers material by Robert Johnson, Bessie Smith and Sonny Boy Williamson, among others. The liner notes include useful cut-by-cut commentary from Bromberg, who explains what Johnson meant referring to an ex-mate's "Elgin movements" in "Walkin' Blues"."

In Blues Blast magazine, Steve Jones said, "David Bromberg has had a fifty-five year recording career and his music still sounds fresh and new.... This is a super CD by a great and talented set of artists. The fun they had making it really comes out in their music – it is a joy to listen to!"

== Track listing ==
1. "Walkin' Blues" (Robert Johnson) – 5:39
2. "How Come My Dog Don't Bark When You Come 'Round?" (unknown) – 4:26
3. "Kentucky Blues" (George "Little Hat" Jones) – 2:29
4. "Why Are People Like That?" (Bobby Charles) – 4:02
5. "A Fool for You" (Ray Charles) – 4:54
6. "Eyesight to the Blind" (Sonny Boy Williamson) – 3:30
7. "500 Miles" (traditional, arranged by David Bromberg and Larry Campbell) – 4:54
8. "Yield Not to Temptation" (Deadric Malone) – 2:42
9. "You've Been a Good Ole Wagon" (John Willie Henry) – 5:51
10. "Delia" (traditional, arranged by Bromberg) – 6:38
11. "The Blues, the Whole Blues, and Nothing But the Blues" (Gary Nicholson, Russell Smith) – 3:25
12. "This Month" (Bromberg) – 5:53
13. "You Don't Have to Go" (Bromberg) – 3:19

== Personnel ==
David Bromberg Band

- David Bromberg – electric guitar, electric slide guitar, acoustic guitar, vocals
- Butch Amiot – bass guitar
- Mark Cosgrove – electric guitar, mandolin
- Josh Kanusky – drums
- Nate Grower – fiddle

Additional musicians

- Marco Benevento – piano
- Steve Bernstein – trumpet
- Larry Campbell – acoustic guitar, acoustic slide guitar
- Justin Guip – tambourine
- Birch Johnson – trombone
- Nancy Josephson – backing vocals
- Lou Marini – saxophone, clarinet
- Bill Payne – piano, organ, keyboards
- Kathleen Weber – backing vocals
- Teresa Williams – backing vocals

Production

- Larry Campbell – producer, horn arrangements
- Justin Guip – recording, mixing
- Greg Calbi – mastering
- Peter Ecklund – horn arrangements
- Jeri Heiden – art direction
- Jim McGuire – photography
- Delores Lowe – executive producer
- Robert F. Macchione – executive producer
- Mark McKenna – management
- Mike Russo – tour manager
- David Bromberg – liner notes essay ("The Whole Blues & Nothing But")
