= Big Road =

Studio album by David Bromberg Band
- Released: April 17, 2020
- Genre: Americana
- Length: 58:26 (DVD 34:33)
- Label: Red House
- Producer: Larry Campbell

David Bromberg chronology
The Blues, the Whole Blues, and Nothing But the Blues (2016)	Big Road (2020)

Big Road is an album by the David Bromberg Band. It was released on CD, LP, and as a digital download on April 17, 2020. The CD also includes a DVD video of the band playing several of the songs on the album.

For Big Road, musician, singer, and songwriter David Bromberg and his touring band went into the studio and recorded a dozen roots music songs in a variety of styles. Bromberg sings lead vocals and plays acoustic guitar, electric guitar, and mandolin, accompanied on most of the tracks by his band as well as several guest musicians. Like his two previous albums, Big Road was produced by Larry Campbell.

== Critical reception ==
In PopMatters, Steve Horowitz wrote, "The album does a good job of mixing things up stylistically while maintaining a consistent vibe. The songs run together without ever sounding repetitive.... Big Road contains elements of old-time country, folk, bluegrass, gospel, blues and more.... Bromberg's singing is infectiously good, but it's his (and his bandmates) playing that makes the disc such a pleasure to hear."

In American Songwriter, Lee Zimmerman said, "With this latest offering, Big Road, credited, appropriately to the David Bromberg Band, he offers an excellent summation of his stance that spans the depth and breadth of his musical palette...Naturally, the arrangements are immaculate, given the oversight of producer Larry Campbell, although it’s Bromberg’s searing fretwork and warbling yet unassuming vocals that underscore the more poignant perspectives."

In Elmore Magazine, Iain Patience wrote, "Bromberg, a giant of US roots music with a back catalog of countless wonderful releases doesn’t disappoint with his latest offering... With Big Road, we find Bromberg working with his band, while keeping his guitar picking absolutely central to everything he does.... Overall, this is one of those rare, instant classic albums, faultless in conception and delivery from start to finish. This is Bromberg at his deservedly much-lauded best."

In No Depression, Doug Heselgrave said, "Since he released his first album in 1971, Bromberg has always embraced a 'kitchen sink' philosophy toward music in which every conceivable style – swing, folk, country, rock, bluegrass, and more – and permutation of a tune is treated with equal reverence.... More than four decades into his career, he continues to breathe new life into very old songs by approaching them with the attitude that even though traditional music is sacred, it certainly isn't fragile... Big Road is a truly masterful work."

In Folk Alley, Henry Carrigan said, "Listening to David Bromberg and his band's Big Road is like driving on the open road with the windows down, letting the breezes of various musical styles wash over you.... Multi-instrumentalist Bromberg knows how to have fun playing music, and he gives each of [his] band members a chance to drive the music around. There's a joyous sense of camaraderie on the album that permeates the music... [E]very song on this album astonishes with its musicianship, its musical unity, its palpable spirit of joy and fun and sheer love of music. Big Road is, without a doubt, one of the best albums of the year."

In Glide Magazine, Jim Hynes wrote, "[Bromberg's] vocals have never sounded better, and this band is as first-rate as it gets. This is truly special; the apex of American music – blues, gospel, bluegrass, folk, and country all in one package.... To appreciate the depth and breadth of this band's talent, it's best to listen to the whole recording to enjoy how they seamlessly cross genre boundaries.... David Bromberg is one of a few to earn the title 'Godfather of Americana' long before this recording yet it's as if the greatness of his half-century in music is all distilled into this superbly executed live studio album."

== Track listing ==
1. "Big Road" (Tommy Johnson)
2. "Lovin' of the Game" (Pat Garvey, Victoria Garvey)
3. "Just Because You Didn't Answer" (Thomas Bishop Burke)
4. "George, Merle & Conway" (David Bromberg)
5. "Mary Jane" (unknown)
6. "Standing in the Need of Prayer" (Traditional, arranged by Bromberg)
7. "The Hills of Isle au Haut" (Gordon Bok)
8. Medley: "Maiden's Prayer" / "Blackberry Blossom" / "Katy Hill" (Bob Wills / Traditional, arranged by Nate Growler / Traditional, arranged by Bromberg)
9. "Diamond Lil" (Bromberg)
10. "Who Will the Next Fool Be?" (Charlie Rich)
11. "Take This Hammer" (Huddie Ledbetter)
12. "Roll On John" (Palmer Crisp, Margot Mayo)

== Personnel ==
David Bromberg Band

- David Bromberg – vocals, acoustic guitar, electric guitar, mandolin
- Mark Cosgrove – electric guitar, acoustic guitar, mandolin, vocals
- Nate Growler – fiddle, mandolin, vocals
- Josh Kanusky – drums, vocals
- Suavek Zaniesienko – bass guitar, double bass, vocals

Additional musicians

- Dan Walker – piano, organ, accordion
- Larry Campbell – pedal steel guitar, mandolin
- Jon-Erik Kelso – trumpet
- Birch Johnson – trombone
- Mark Koza – tenor saxophone
- Bob Stewart – tuba

Production

- Produced by Larry Campbell
- Recording, mixing – Justin Guip
- Assistant engineers – Shubham Mondal, Ru Lemer
- Mastering – Greg Calbi
- Cover art – Kevin Morgan Studio
