= The Deep (band) =

American rock band

- Origin: New York, New York, United States
- Genres: Psychedelic rock; garage rock
- Years active: 1966
- Label: Cameo-Parkway
- Past members: Rusty Evans; Mark Barkan; David Bromberg; D. Blackhurst; C. Blue; L. Pogan; A. Geller

The Deep was an American rock band formed in New York City in 1966. They traveled to Philadelphia to record a one-off LP, Psychedelic Moods, released on Cameo-Parkway Records, which was later recognized as one of the earliest albums to use the word "psychedelic" in its title.

The group was a studio-only project led by musician Rusty Evans and producer Mark Barkan. Evans later formed The Freak Scene, releasing the album Psychedelic Psoul in 1967. Evans also co-wrote and recorded The Third Bardo’s only single, "I’m Five Years Ahead of My Time." While Barkan would record several songs in 1967 with the group Inner Sanctum (later known as Hydro-Pyro).

== Background ==
Rusty Evans was born Marcus Uzilevsky in 1937 in New York City and was the Deep's lead guitarist, primary songwriter, and vocalist. Evans initially recorded in 1958 as a rockabilly singer, before performing as a Greenwich Village folk musician in the late 1950s and early 1960s. He recorded three albums as Rusty Evans – Songs of Our Land, Railroad Songs (both 1964) and Live at Gerde's Folk City (1965) – and was later a member of the folk group The New Christy Minstrels. Musician David Bromberg is also known to have played on The Deep's one and only album, although it is unknown on which tracks he played.

== History ==
In the early summer of 1966, Evans convinced producer Mark Barkan to help him record a psychedelic album. They secured arrangements with the Philadelphia-based Cameo-Parkway label, where they became labelmates to Question Mark and the Mysterians, for a meager budget of $1200. In August, Evans and Barkan assembled a group of New York musicians to record as the Deep, and they drove in a rundown car to Philadelphia to record what would become Psychedelic Moods, the band's sole album which was done in the short period of four days and would necessitate late-night sessions in order to be finished on time. The all-night sessions also provided the musicians, who were unable to afford a hotel, with a place to sleep.

At the time of recording Psychedelic Moods, only Rusty Evans had a career in the music industry prior to recording, the other members in the Deep were his friends. Evans "directed the band to let loose and get crazy". He created the cover art and pressed "about 5,000 copies" of the album. The Deep existed as a studio-only band, and, aside from sessions for their album, produced no other recordings under that name nor performed live.

The album released in November 1966 was one of the earliest to include the word "psychedelic" in its title around the same time as the Blues Magoos' Psychedelic Lollipop, but predated by the 13th Floor Elevators' The Psychedelic Sounds of the 13th Floor Elevators in October 1966.

=== Rusty Evans and the Freak Scene ===
Evans left Cameo-Parkway to record a new album for the Columbia Records label in 1967. Abandoning the "Deep" name, this second album was credited to the band The Freak Scene and entitled Psychedelic Psoul. Despite the name change, the band continued to be the same studio-only lineup from the first album. However, the Freak Scene's album met the same results as Psychedelic Moods. The group disbanded in late 1967. The album was later re-released by Sony BMG through Columbia Records on vinyl.

After this venture, Evans returned to performing as a solo musician. He recorded under his birthname, Marcus, for a self-titled album in 1969, which produced compositions conceived as psychedelic folk in nature. He did not record another album until 1979, when he released Life's Railway Heaven, another folk effort. Evans recorded sporadically until his death, usually in the style of folk or rockabilly music, and in the 1990s released two new age CDs, Slice of Light and Gypsy Dreams, credited as Uzca. He also led a Johnny Cash tribute band. Under his real name of Marcus Uzilevsky, he was a respected visual artist best known for his landscape paintings, and was exhibited widely in California.

On December 5, 2015, Rusty Evans passed away in Woodacre, California.

=== Inner Sanctum (Hydro-Pyro) ===
In April 1967, Barkan recorded material with the New York psychedelic rock band the Inner Sanctum which was composed by Kevin Michael (lead guitar), Gerry Michael (drums), Vince Taggart (rhythm guitar) and Frank Thumhart (bass guitar). The Inner Sanctum recordings were intended as a potential follow-up to Psychedelic Moods by the Deep, similar to Evans' Psychedelic Psoul with the Freak Scene. However, the songs went unreleased for decades until Barkan released them for the first time in the 1980s under the name "Hydro-Pyro" due to copyright reasons. The original band members went uncredited.
