= Jack-Knife Gypsy =

Studio album by Paul Siebel
- Released: February 1971
- Studio: Sunset Sound, Los Angeles, California; Elektra, Los Angeles, California
- Genre: Country rock/Folk rock
- Length: 37:44
- Label: Elektra (42076), Line (900951)
- Producer: Robert W. Zachary Jr.

Paul Siebel chronology
Woodsmoke and Oranges (1970)	Jack-Knife Gypsy (1971)	Live at McCabe's (1981)

Jack-Knife Gypsy is the second album from folk rock/country rock musician Paul Siebel.

== Reception ==
Professional ratings
Review scores
Source	Rating
Allmusic	3/5 stars

Music critic Jim Worbois wrote in his Allmusic "The first record may have drawn listeners for the opportunity to hear Siebel originals of songs they knew from elsewhere. This record does not have that same kind of pull but is every bit as good."

== Reissues ==
- Jack-Knife Gypsy was reissued on CD by Line in 1994.
- Jack-Knife Gypsy was reissued on CD with Woodsmoke and Oranges by WEA International in 2004.
- Jack-Knife Gypsy was reissued on CD with Woodsmoke and Oranges and two bonus cuts by Beat Goes On in 2020.

== Track listing ==
All songs by Paul Siebel.

1. "Jasper and the Miners" – 2:37
2. "If I Could Stay" – 3:41
3. "Jack-Knife Gypsy" – 3:25
4. "Prayer Song" – 4:47
5. "Legend of the Captain's Daughter" – 3:51
6. "Chips Are Down" – 4:29
7. "Pinto Pony" – 2:22
8. "Hillbilly Child" – 2:58
9. "Uncle Dudley" – 3:09
10. "Miss Jones" – 4:24
11. "Jeremiah's Song" – 2:01

== Personnel ==
- Paul Siebel - rhythm guitar, vocals
- Clarence White - lead guitar
- Robert Warford - lead guitar
- Buddy Emmons - steel guitar
- David Grisman - mandolin; string arrangement on "Prayer Song"
- Jim Buchanan - violin, viola
- Doug Kershaw - fiddle
- Bill Wolf - bass
- Bernie Leadon - guitar
- Gary White - bass
- Ralph Schuckett - organ, piano
- Russ Kunkel - drums
- Paul Dillon, Peter Ecklund, Peter Kubaska, Ralph Lee Smith - other sidemen
- Richard Greene - string on "Prayer Song"

== Production ==
- Producer: Robert W. Zachary
- Recording Engineer: Bill Lazerus at Sunset Sound, LA / Fritz Richmond at Elektra Sound Recorders, LA
- Mixing: Bruce Morgan at Elektra Sound Recorders, LA
- Art Direction: Robert L. Heimall
- Photography: Frank Bez
- Mastering: Bob Ludwig
