= Paul Siebel =

American singer-songwriter and guitarist (1937–2022)

- Born: September 19, 1937; Buffalo, New York, U.S.
- Died: April 5, 2022 (aged 84) Centreville, Maryland, U.S.
- Genres: Country rock, folk rock
- Occupation: Singer-songwriter
- Instrument: Guitar
- Years active: 1968–1978
- Labels: Elektra

Paul Karl Siebel (September 19, 1937 – April 5, 2022) was an American singer-songwriter and guitarist, born in Buffalo, New York. He is best known for other artists' cover versions of his songs, most notably "Louise". Other frequently covered Siebel songs include "Spanish Johnny" (which was originally a poem written by Willa Cather in 1917 and expanded upon by Siebel), "Long Afternoons," "Any Day Woman," "Nashville Again," "She Made Me Lose My Blues," "Then Came the Children" and "Pinto Pony".

== Biography ==
After serving in the military, Siebel began playing folk clubs, eventually moving to Greenwich Village, where he found support in the coffeehouse circuit. An article in The New York Times on February 14, 1970, written by Mike Jahn, described Siebel as "a folk singer with a country and western bias ... a 32‐year‐old native of Buffalo and musically a product of the Greenwich Village folk scene" and said that he "sings in high nasal and hillbilly manner, rather like Bob Dylan's singing in his early days", referring to his songs as "uncomplicated country and folk songs, with occasional thoughts about such things as suburban living and raising children". Typical of his songs were “Bride 1945" and "My Town". At The Bitter End, he played acoustic guitar and was backed by David Bromberg, Don Brooks, Jeff Gutcheon and Gary White

In 1969, Elektra Records became aware of a collection of songs Siebel made with David Bromberg and signed him to record Woodsmoke and Oranges (1970) and Jack-Knife Gypsy (1971). His songs were covered by, among others, Bromberg, Willy DeVille, Linda Ronstadt, Bonnie Raitt, Jerry Jeff Walker, Kate Wolf, Mary McCaslin, Emmylou Harris, Waylon Jennings, The Flying Burrito Brothers, Rick Roberts and Leo Kottke; but he remained mostly unknown to the larger public.

After 1971, his songwriting production stopped. Siebel became depressed and developed drug problems. Now and then his name came up in interviews with other artists. Kris Kristofferson tips his hat to Siebel in his song "The Pilgrim". Siebel played McCabe's Guitar Shop in 1978, which was considered a comeback, and appeared on a 1977 release, Music From Mud Acres, with a cover of the Hank Williams song "Weary Blues".

In 1996, folk magazine Dirty Linen tracked him down and talked with the then 58-year-old who was baking bread for a living.

In 2004, Elektra released a compilation CD with most of Siebel's songs. Its booklet contains an interview by Peter Doggett where Siebel looks back on his career.

Siebel made his home on Maryland's Eastern Shore in the 1990s. According to a 2010 profile in American Songwriter, Siebel was then working an "outdoorsy job with the Parks Department" in Maryland. As of 2016, Siebel retired from working in Queen Anne's County, Maryland, and no longer played for the public.

Siebel died from complications of pulmonary fibrosis on April 5, 2022, at the age of 84.

== Discography ==
- 1970 Woodsmoke and Oranges Elektra lp EKS 74064. w. David Bromberg, Richard Greene, Weldon Myrick.
- 1971 Jack-Knife Gypsy Elektra lp EKS-74081. w. Clarence White, David Grisman, Jimmy Buchanan, Buddy Emmons.
- 1978 Live at McCabe's Rag Baby Records lp, various numbers. w. David Bromberg and Gary White.
- 1995 Paul Siebel Philo CD PH 1161, a compilation CD, includes all songs from Woodsmoke & Oranges plus five songs from Jack-Knife Gypsy)
