= Sideman Serenade =

Studio album by David Bromberg
- Released: 1989
- Label: Rounder

David Bromberg chronology
Long Way from Here (1986)	Sideman Serenade (1989)	The Player: A Retrospective (1998)

Sideman Serenade is an album by the American musician David Bromberg, released in 1989. It was his first studio album in almost 10 years; he would not release another studio album until 2007. Bromberg had spent much of the 1980s working as a violin maker, after legal difficulties with his previous label, Fantasy Records.

== Production ==
The album was recorded primarily in Chicago. It appeared three years after Bromberg signed with Rounder Records, due to illness, the deaths of Bromberg's parents, and the rescheduling of recording sessions. Jorma Kaukonen, the Jessy Dixon Singers, and Dr. John were among the many guest musicians—and working sidemen—who appeared on the album. A tribute album to backing musicians, Sideman Serenade is divided into "city songs" and "country songs". "Sideman's Samba" was written during a Brazilian vacation Bromberg took in the late 1960s.

== Critical reception ==
Professional ratings
Review scores
Source	Rating
AllMusic	2/5 stars
Chicago Tribune	3/4 stars
The Encyclopedia of Popular Music	3/5 stars
MusicHound Rock: The Essential Album Guide	3/5 stars

The Chicago Tribune wrote that "listeners who can get past Bromberg's less than virtuosic voice will be rewarded with excellent offbeat performances and memorable material." The San Diego Union-Tribune called the album "full of the same kind of spirited, melodic blues, with humor, that made him one of the stalwarts of the '70s folk scene."

AllMusic wrote that "the only problem with this session was Bromberg, for all his knowledge and zeal, just wasn't that convincing or gripping a vocalist."

== Track listing ==
No.	Title	Length
1.	"Mobile Lil the Dancing Witch"
2.	"Testify"
3.	"Sideman's Samba"
4.	"Midnight Hour Blues"
5.	"Top of the Slide"
6.	"Save the Last Dance for Me"
7.	"Watch Baby Fall"
8.	"Long Tall Mama"
9.	"Come All You Fair and Tender Maidens"
