= Midnight on the Water (David Bromberg album) =

Studio album by David Bromberg
- Released: 1975
- Genre: Folk, folk rock, bluegrass
- Length: 38:30
- Label: Columbia
- Producer: Brian Ahern, Bernie Leadon

David Bromberg chronology
Wanted Dead or Alive (1974)	Midnight on the Water (1975)	How Late'll Ya Play 'Til? (1976)

Midnight on the Water is an album by David Bromberg. His fourth album, it was released by Columbia Records as a vinyl LP in 1975. It was released in CD format by Sony Records in 1994, and by SBME Special Markets in 2009. It was also released as a double CD, combined with Bromberg's previous album Wanted Dead or Alive, by BGO Records in 2010.

== Critical reception ==
Professional ratings
Review scores
Source	Rating
Allmusic	3/5 stars
Allmusic (reissue)	4/5 stars

Writing in Driftwood Magazine in 2011, Craig Harris said, "Produced by Brian Ahern (Anne Murray, Emmylou Harris) and Bernie Leadon (formerly with the Flying Burrito Brothers and the Eagles), Midnight On The Water remains a milestone in the history of Americana. Tighter arrangements and a well-rehearsed band made this a genre-hopping smorgasbord of bluegrass, country, 1950s pop, and Celtic fiddle tunes. Showing equal dexterity on guitar and fiddle, Bromberg frames 10 cover tunes and 1 original ("The Joke's on Me") with a historic collection of awe-inspiring players and singers. Members of his then-touring band, including pennywhistle/clarinet player Billy Novick, fiddler/mandolinist Jay Ungar, violin/viola player Evan Stover, guitarist/fiddler/bassist Hugh McDonald, drummer Steve Mosley and cornet/trumpet/mellophone player and arranger Peter Ecklund, set a foundation that continues to stand 35 years later, while an amazing array of guests including Jesse Ed Davis (guitar), Mac "Dr. John" Rebennack (piano), Buddy Cage and "Red" Rhodes (pedal steel) and backup singers Bonnie Raitt, Emmylou Harris, Linda Ronstadt, Doyle Lawson, Ricky Skaggs and Lyn Hardy add the spice."

== Track listing ==
Side one:

1. "(What a) Wonderful World" (Sam Cooke, Lou Adler, Herb Alpert) – 3:23
2. "Yankee's Revenge: Medley" (traditional) – 5:55
3. "I Like to Sleep Late in the Morning" (David Blue) – 3:26
4. "Nobody's" (Gary White) – 4:58

Side two:

5. "Don't Put That Thing on Me" (Clifford Gibson) – 2:52
6. "Mr. Blue" (DeWayne Blackwell) – 2:55
7. "Dark Hollow" (Bill Browning) – 2:59
8. "If I Get Lucky" (Booker T. Washington) – 4:03
9. "The Joke's on Me" (David Bromberg) – 3:32
10. "Midnight on the Water" (traditional) – 4:27

== Personnel ==
=== Musicians ===
- David Bromberg – guitar, dobro, fiddle, mandolin, vocals
- Murray Adler – violin
- Brian Ahern – guitar
- Buddy Cage – pedal steel guitar
- Joe Darensbourg – clarinet
- Jesse Ed Davis – guitar
- Julie Dougal – violin
- Dr. John – piano
- Peter Ecklund – trumpet, cornet, flugelhorn, mellophone
- Dick Fegy – guitar, violin
- Paul Fleisher – saxophone, penny whistle
- James Getzoff – violin
- Ann Goodman – cello
- Lyn Hardy – vocals
- Emmylou Harris – vocals
- John Herald – vocals
- Brantley Kearns – violin, vocals
- Doyle Lawson – vocals
- Bernie Leadon – guitar
- Hugh McDonald – bass
- Steve Mosley – drums
- Billy Novick – clarinet, penny whistle
- Tony Posk – violin
- Bonnie Raitt – vocals
- Red Rhodes – pedal steel guitar
- Linda Ronstadt – vocals
- Haim Shtrum – violin
- Ricky Skaggs – vocals
- Evan Stover – violin, viola
- Streamline – trombone
- Jay Ungar – fiddle, mandolin
- Lyndon Ungar – vocals
- Ernie Watts – saxophone

=== Production ===
- Produced by: Brian Ahern, Bernie Leadon
- Engineers: Brian Ahern, Chris Skene, Paul Skene, Charlie Tallent, Stuart Taylor
- Art direction: Lisa Sparagano
- Design: Andy Engel
- Photography: Al Clayton
