= Demon in Disguise =

1972 studio/live album by David Bromberg

Studio album / Live album by David Bromberg
- Released: 1972
- Genres: Folk, folk rock, bluegrass
- Label: Columbia
- Producer: David Bromberg

David Bromberg chronology
David Bromberg (1972)	Demon in Disguise (1972)	Wanted Dead or Alive (1974)

Professional ratings
Review scores
Source	Rating
AllMusic	4/5 stars
The Rolling Stone Record Guide	1/5 stars

Demon in Disguise is an album by David Bromberg. His second album, it was released by Columbia Records in 1972. It was released as a CD by Wounded Bird Records in 2005.

Demon in Disguise contains some songs that were recorded in the studio, and some that were recorded live. The musicians on the songs "Sharon" and "Demon in Disguise" include five members of the Grateful Dead — Jerry Garcia, Phil Lesh, Bill Kreutzmann, Keith Godchaux, and Donna Jean Godchaux.

"Sharon" was sampled by the Beastie Boys for the song "Johnny Ryall" on their album Paul's Boutique.

== Track listing ==
Side one:

1. "Hardworkin' John" (David Bromberg) – 4:00 *
2. "Sharon" (Bromberg) – 6:07
3. Medley of Irish fiddle tunes (traditional, arranged by Bromberg) – 2:10 *
4. "Diamond Lil" (Bromberg) – 6:26

Side two:

5. "Jugband Song" (Bromberg) – 4:24 *
6. "Demon in Disguise" (Bromberg) – 5:08
7. "Tennessee Waltz" (Pee Wee King, Redd Stewart) – 3:06 *
8. "Mr. Bojangles" (Jerry Jeff Walker) – 7:30 *
9. "Sugar in the Gourd" (Tut Taylor) – 1:44 *

*recorded live

== Personnel ==
=== Musicians ===
- David Bromberg – guitar, vocals
- Joshie Armstead – vocals
- Steve Burgh – bass, vocals
- Jerry Garcia – guitar
- Donna Godchaux – vocals
- Keith Godchaux – keyboards
- Jeff Gutcheon – keyboards
- Hilda Harris – vocals
- Kenny Kosek – fiddle
- Bill Kreutzmann – drums
- Jack Lee – vocals
- Phil Lesh – bass
- Andrew McMahon – vocals
- Tracy Nelson – vocals
- Will Scarlett – harmonica
- Tom Sheehan – bass
- Andy Statman – mandolin, saxophone
- Jody Stecher – mandolin, vocals
- Tash Thomas – vocals

=== Production ===
- Producer: David Bromberg
- Engineering: James Green, David Brown, Stan Tonkel, Buddy Graham, Stan Hutto
- Remix engineers: Tim Geelan, Don Meehan
- Cover design: Sarina Bromberg, Hiroshi Marishima
- Photographs: Jim McGuire
