= David Bromberg (album) =

Studio album by David Bromberg
- Released: February 16, 1972
- Studios: Columbia, New York City; World Control, Philadelphia; unspecified facility in Nashville
- Genre: Folk
- Length: 39:36
- Label: Columbia
- Producer: David Bromberg

David Bromberg chronology
David Bromberg (1972)	Demon in Disguise (1972)

Singles from David Bromberg
- 1. "The Holdup" Released: May 15, 1972

David Bromberg is the debut album by American multi-instrumentalist and singer-songwriter David Bromberg. It was released by Columbia Records in February 1972. The album includes "The Holdup", written by Bromberg and George Harrison, and "Sammy's Song", which features Bob Dylan on harmonica.

Bromberg came to record the album as a proven session musician and after performing an impromptu solo set at the 1970 Isle of Wight Festival. The album received highly favorable reviews from some music critics. In the United States, it peaked at number 194 on the Billboard albums chart. Released as a single there, "The Holdup" became a radio favorite. The album was reissued on CD by Wounded Bird Records in 2007.

== Background ==
After studying musicology at Columbia University in New York, David Bromberg established himself as a solo performer on the Greenwich Village folk circuit in the mid 1960s. Among his many guest appearances for other artists, he contributed to Bob Dylan's Self Portrait double album and became one of Dylan's preferred musicians.

Bromberg also backed folk singer Rosalie Sorrels at the 1970 Isle of Wight Festival and then performed an impromptu solo set. The success of this appearance led to him being offered a recording contract with Columbia Records.

== Recording ==
Bromberg recorded his debut album at Columbia Studios in New York City; live at World Control Studios in Philadelphia; and at an unnamed location in Nashville. Among the musicians at the sessions were David Amram, Norman Blake, Vassar Clements and Steve Burgh. Dylan played harmonica on "Sammy's Song", a Bromberg composition that author Simon Leng describes as "a barrier-breaking tale of a young man's sexual encounter with a prostitute". The session for "Sammy's Song" took place at Columbia's Studio C on October 5, 1971.

Bromberg later said he was "floored" that George Harrison—whom he met at one of the final sessions for Self Portrait in 1970—was familiar with his music, as Dylan had taught Harrison one of Bromberg's songs. He and Harrison subsequently co-wrote "The Holdup" during an evening at the home of New York Post journalist Al Aronowitz, who was also Bromberg's manager. The song depicts tax collecting as the Internal Revenue Service staging a robbery on citizens. Bromberg recalled that, with only one guitar available, he and Harrison passed the instrument between them; he credited Harrison with writing "some of the best lines" by introducing English humor and expressions. A writer for the American roots music magazine No Depression later described the song as a "manic then suddenly dulcetly Mexican tune." (Note: In Leng's description, "The Holdup" is "redolent of the two men's celebrated senses of humor" and a "quirky, jokey version" of Harrison's Beatles composition "Taxman".)

Along with "Dehlia" and "Pine Tree Woman", "The Holdup" was one of the tracks that Bromberg recorded before an audience at World Control in Philadelphia. During a subsequent visit to New York, in 1971, Harrison overdubbed a slide guitar part onto this recording.

== Release ==
Columbia Records issued David Bromberg on February 16, 1972 in the United States. Aronowitz wrote the liner note essay for the LP sleeve. Columbia's trade ad that month stated that Bromberg's guitar playing for artists such as Dylan had long been recognized in the underground press, and included a quote from Don Heckman of The New York Times that described Bromberg as "a major talent with all the qualities of a star". The album's UK release, on the CBS imprint, took place on June 2.

In the US, "The Holdup" was released as a single on May 15, backed by "Suffer to Sing the Blues". "The Holdup" became a popular track on US radio. The album spent four weeks on the Billboard Top LPs & Tape chart, peaking at number 194. Having established himself as a folk rock recording artist and performer, Bromberg continued his parallel career as a concert and studio backing musician. In September, he, Burgh, Dylan and Steve Goodman performed with John Prine—one of several singer-songwriters to be touted as "the New Dylan" in the early 1970s—at one of Prine's first New York concerts. (Note: In addition, at Harrison's invitation, Bromberg played on the 1973 sessions for Ringo Starr's "Sunshine Life for Me", along with members of the Band, and for Ravi Shankar's album Shankar Family & Friends.)

"The Holdup" and "Sammy's Song" were among the tracks included on Bromberg's 1998 compilation The Player: A Retrospective. (Note: According to a 1998 review in No Depression, "The Holdup" is "perhaps [Bromberg's] best known work".) The David Bromberg album was issued on CD in 2007 by Wounded Bird Records.

== Critical reception ==
Professional ratings
Review scores
Source	Rating
AllMusic	4/5 stars
MusicHound	4/5
The Rolling Stone Record Guide	1/5 stars

Cash Box's reviewer described David Bromberg as "a treat from start to finish" with Bromberg's voice unorthodox but "curiously appropriate" to the songs, and his guitar playing "superb". The writer commented that Bromberg had already attracted a following through his club performances and session playing, particularly with Dylan, and that his "rough and ready romper" with Harrison was sure to be of "special interest". In his album review for The New York Times, Heckman found the LP a faithful representation of the "spoken‐sung songs of whimsey and sadness" that had become familiar through Bromberg's live performances. Although Bromberg's singing was not instantly attractive to some, he continued, "the directness with which he describes simple, but universal feelings, is rare talent, indeed."

Record Mirror said it was difficult to describe "this writing, guitar-playing, singing talking talent" in words, and instead recommended listening to "Lonesome Dave's Lovesick Blues", "The Holdup" and "Suffer to Sing the Blues". The reviewer concluded that these tracks offered "humour, pathos and delicacy".

Noel Coppage of Stereo Review deemed the album a "Recording of Special Merit" and recognized Bromberg as "a folk-blues interpreter who somehow manages to stand outside the song the way Dylan used to and the old bluesmen did". Coppage said the record had its flaws but the artist's "superstar" potential was such that he feared widespread praise of Bromberg as "the Latest Thing" would inevitably be followed by faddist scrutiny—as had befallen Tolkien, Dylan, J.D. Salinger and James Taylor—which might stop his potential from being fully realized. (Note: Coppage acknowledged that his own "rave review" of the album was likely to contribute to this unwelcome phenomenon.)

By contrast, Ariel Swartley, writing in the 1983 Rolling Stone Record Guide, gave the album one star out of five (denoting a "poor" work). She derided all of Bromberg's albums, saying that his reputation as an amusing live performer did not carry over to his recordings, and his singing voice either "squeaks like an adolescent in the church choir" or "simply grates".

In his review for AllMusic, William Ruhlmann writes of the album: "This one finds the artist determined to demonstrate the range of his talent, and that range extends from pop/rock to bluegrass, with lots of blues and folk-blues thrown in ... Bromberg may still be more of a player than a frontman, and more of a traditionalist than a songwriter, but this disc presents a new wrinkle in some very familiar styles, suggesting that it's possible for an accomplished sideman to move downstage and take over the spotlight."

== Track listing ==
All tracks composed by David Bromberg except where indicated.

Side one

1. "(Introduction) Last Song for Shelby Jean" – 4:17
2. "Suffer to Sing the Blues" – 4:54
3. "The Boggy Road to Milledgeville (Arkansas Traveler)" (traditional; arranged and adapted by Norman Blake and Bromberg) – 2:12
4. "Dehlia" (traditional; arranged and adapted by Bromberg) – 7:51

Side two

1. "Pine Tree Woman" – 5:16
2. "Lonesome Dave's Lovesick Blues #3" – 2:42
3. "Mississippi Blues" (traditional; arranged and adapted by Bromberg) – 4:36
4. "The Holdup" (George Harrison, Bromberg) – 3:00
5. "Sammy's Song" – 4:48

== Personnel ==
According to the 1972 album credits (except where noted):

- David Bromberg – vocals, guitars, Dobro
- David Amram – french horn
- Jo Armstead – vocals
- Norman Blake – guitar
- Steve Burgh – bass, vocals
- Vassar Clements – fiddle
- Bob Dylan – harmonica (on "Sammy's Song")
- Richard Grando – tenor saxophone
- George Harrison – slide guitar (on "The Holdup")
- John Hartford – banjo
- Steve Mosley – drums, vocals
- David Nichtern – electric guitar, piano, vocals
- Willow Scarlett – harmonica, vocals
- Randy Scruggs – bass
- Jody Stecher – mandolin, fiddle, vocals
- Tut Taylor – mandolin
