= Mark Barkan =

American songwriter and record producer (1934–2020)

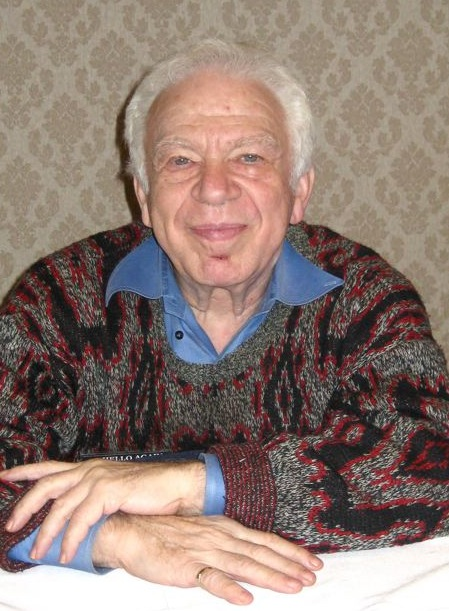
- Barkan in 2008

Background information
- Born: Marcus Barkan; July 4, 1934; Brooklyn, New York, U.S.
- Died: May 8, 2020 (aged 85) New York City, U.S.
- Occupations: Songwriter, record producer

Marcus Barkan (July 4, 1934 – May 8, 2020) was an American songwriter and record producer. He was also a musical director for the television show The Banana Splits Adventure Hour, which aired between September 7, 1968, and September 5, 1970, lasting two seasons, on NBC.

== Biography ==
Barkan was born in Brooklyn, New York City, and started his career as a writer in the Brill Building. His first major success as a writer was with "The Writing on the Wall", a 1961 US top 5 hit for Adam Wade which he co-wrote with Sandy Baron and George Paxton (credited as George Eddy). He had further success with "I'm Gonna Be Warm This Winter" (co-written with Hank Hunter), which was a hit for Connie Francis in 1963; Lesley Gore's Top 5 hit "She's a Fool" (co-written with Ben Raleigh); the often-covered "Pretty Flamingo", which was a hit single for Manfred Mann in 1966; and "The Tra La La Song (One Banana, Two Banana)" from The Banana Splits (co-written with Ritchie Adams).

In 1966, Barkan was responsible for producing the album Psychedelic Moods, by The Deep, which has been credited as the first album to have the word psychedelic in the title. Barkan also wrote songs for many other artists, and was involved in "cult" bands as well. He and Ritchie Adams co-wrote songs for The Archies, The Monkees, and many other recording artists in the late 1960s. The team of Barkan and Adams was instrumental in the Banana Splits project, and they also wrote and produced all the songs for Toomorrow, a 1970 sci-fi musical, produced by Don Kirshner, which starred Olivia Newton-John as a band member.

In later life, he collaborated with Albert Bouchard, formerly of Blue Öyster Cult, on the 2018 album Fidelis ad Mortem.

Barkan died at his home in New York City on May 8, 2020, at age 85.
