= Wanted Dead or Alive (David Bromberg album) =

Studio album / Live album by David Bromberg
- Released: 7 January 1974 (US)
- Genre: Folk, folk rock, blues
- Label: Columbia
- Producer: David Bromberg

David Bromberg chronology
Demon in Disguise (1972)	Wanted Dead or Alive (1974)	Midnight on the Water (1975)

Wanted Dead or Alive is an album by David Bromberg. It was his third album, released by Columbia Records in 1974.

The title Wanted Dead or Alive is a play on words, referring to how the record was created. Side one of the LP was recorded in the studio with various musicians, including four members of the Grateful Dead − Jerry Garcia, Phil Lesh, Keith Godchaux and Bill Kreutzmann. Side two was recorded live.

== Critical reception ==
Professional ratings
Review scores
Source	Rating
AllMusic	4/5 stars
Christgau's Record Guide	B+

Writing in Driftwood Magazine in 2011, Craig Harris said: "With their masterfully executed mix of America’s musical roots, the albums released by David Bromberg in the mid-1970s remain as much fun as they were more than a third of a century ago.... Reaching into what he does best, Bromberg came up with an album full of spirit, high energy and musical diversity. Opening with a galloping reprisal of "The Holdup", his collaboration with George Harrison, Bromberg and cohorts... rarely let up. While his vocals were anything but luscious, Bromberg's deep, growl-like singing made every word heartfelt. Showing the depths of his songwriting with four self-composed tunes... Bromberg uses the guitar picking styles that he had learned as a student and protégé of bluesman Reverend Gary Davis as springboards for discovery."

According to AllMusic, "Some of Bromberg's strongest and best-loved material can be found here, including "The Holdup", "Danger Man", "Send Me to the 'Lectric Chair", "The New Lee Highway Blues" and Bob Dylan's "Wallflower"."

== Track listing ==
Side one:

1. "The Holdup" (David Bromberg, George Harrison) – 3:03
2. "Someone Else's Blues" (Bromberg) – 8:00
3. "Danger Man" (Bromberg) – 3:05
4. "The Main Street Moan" (Bromberg) – 5:13

Side two:

5. "Send Me to the 'Lectric Chair" (George Brooks) – 4:52
6. "Statesboro Blues" / "Church Bell Blues" (Blind Willie McTell / Luke Jordan, arranged by Bromberg) – 5:08
7. "Wallflower" (Bob Dylan) – 2:57
8. "Kansas City" (Jerry Leiber, Mike Stoller) – 3:57
9. "The New Lee Highway Blues" (Bromberg) – 5:40

== Personnel ==
=== Musicians ===
- David Bromberg – acoustic and electric guitar, lead vocals
- Steve Burgh – bass
- Peter Ecklund – trumpet, mellophone
- Joe Ferguson – alto and baritone saxophone
- Hungria Garcia – timbales
- Jerry Garcia – acoustic and electric guitar
- Keith Godchaux – piano
- Jeff Gutcheon – piano
- Bill Kreutzmann – drums
- Phil Lesh – bass
- Tony Markellis – bass
- Steve Mosley – bass
- John Payne – alto flute, bass clarinet, tenor saxophone
- Neil Rossi – fiddle
- Andy Statman – mandolin, tenor saxophone
- Jay Ungar – fiddle
- Winnie Winston – banjo
- Jack Lee – background vocals
- Andy McMahon – background vocals
- Tracy Nelson – background vocals
- The Sweet Inspirations – background vocals

=== Production ===
- Produced by: David Bromberg
- Production coordinator: George Eichen
- Horn arrangements on "Danger Man" and "Kansas City": Peter Ecklund
- Engineer, side 1: David Brown
- Engineers, side 2: Buddy Graham, Jerry Smith, Pete Weiss, Frank Laico
- Tape recordists: Louis Waxman, Lehman Yates
- Remix engineer: Tim Geelan
- Mastered by: Jack Ashkinazy
- Photography: Jim McGuire
- Album design: Karen Lee Grant
- Cover concept: Tony Markellis
