= Wallflower (Bob Dylan song) =

Song by Bob Dylan

from the album The Bootleg Series Volumes 1–3 (Rare & Unreleased) 1961–1991
- Released: March 26, 1991
- Recorded: November 4, 1971
- Length: 2:49
- Songwriter: Bob Dylan

"Wallflower" is a song written and recorded in November 1971 by Bob Dylan. Dylan's own recording was not released until almost twenty years later as part of The Bootleg Series Volumes 1–3 (Rare & Unreleased) 1961–1991. An alternate version from the same 1971 session was released in 2013 on The Bootleg Series Vol. 10: Another Self Portrait (1969–1971).

In October 1972, the song was recorded by Doug Sahm, with Dylan singing backing vocal, for Sahm's album Doug Sahm and Band, released in 1973. The song has since been covered by many artists.

== Cover versions ==
A number of artists have recorded a cover of the song (incomplete list):

- David Bromberg, 1974, for Wanted Dead or Alive (Columbia Records)
- Buddy and Julie Miller, 2001 for Buddy & Julie Miller (Hightone)
- Uncle Earl, 2007, for Waterloo, Tennessee (Rounder)
- Diana Krall, 2015, for Wallflower (Verve)
- Anna Elizabeth Laube, 2016, for Tree (Ahh...Pockets! Records)
- The Bottle Rockets
- Magnolia Electric Company
