= David Bromberg =

American singer-songwriter (born 1945)

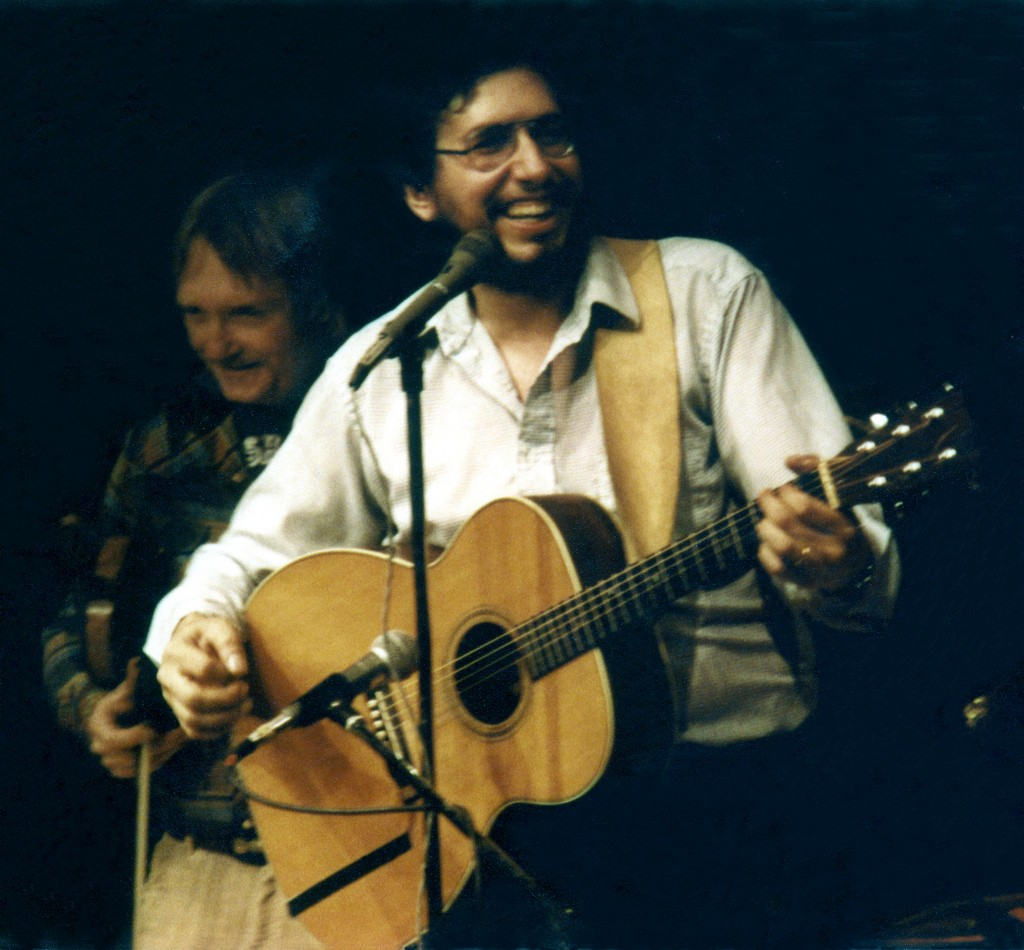
- Bromberg in 1984

Background information
- Born: September 19, 1945 (age 80); Philadelphia, Pennsylvania United States
- Genres: Blues; rock; bluegrass; Americana
- Occupations: Singer, songwriter, musician
- Instruments: Vocals; guitar; fiddle; dobro; mandolin; pedal steel guitar
- Years active: 1960s–present
- Labels: Columbia; Fantasy; Rounder; Wounded Bird; Appleseed
- Website: davidbromberg.net

David Bromberg (born September 19, 1945) is an American multi-instrumentalist, singer, and songwriter. An eclectic artist, Bromberg plays bluegrass rock, blues rock, folk rock, jazz rock, country rock, and rock and roll. He is known for his quirky, humorous lyrics, and the ability to play rhythm and lead guitar at the same time.

Bromberg has played and recorded with many famous musicians, including Richie Havens, Jerry Jeff Walker, Willie Nelson, Jorma Kaukonen, Jerry Garcia, Rusty Evans (The Deep) and Bob Dylan. He co-wrote the song "The Holdup" with George Harrison, who played on Bromberg's self-titled 1972 album. In 2008, he was nominated for a Grammy Award. Bromberg is known for his fingerpicking style that he learned from Reverend Gary Davis.

== Early life ==
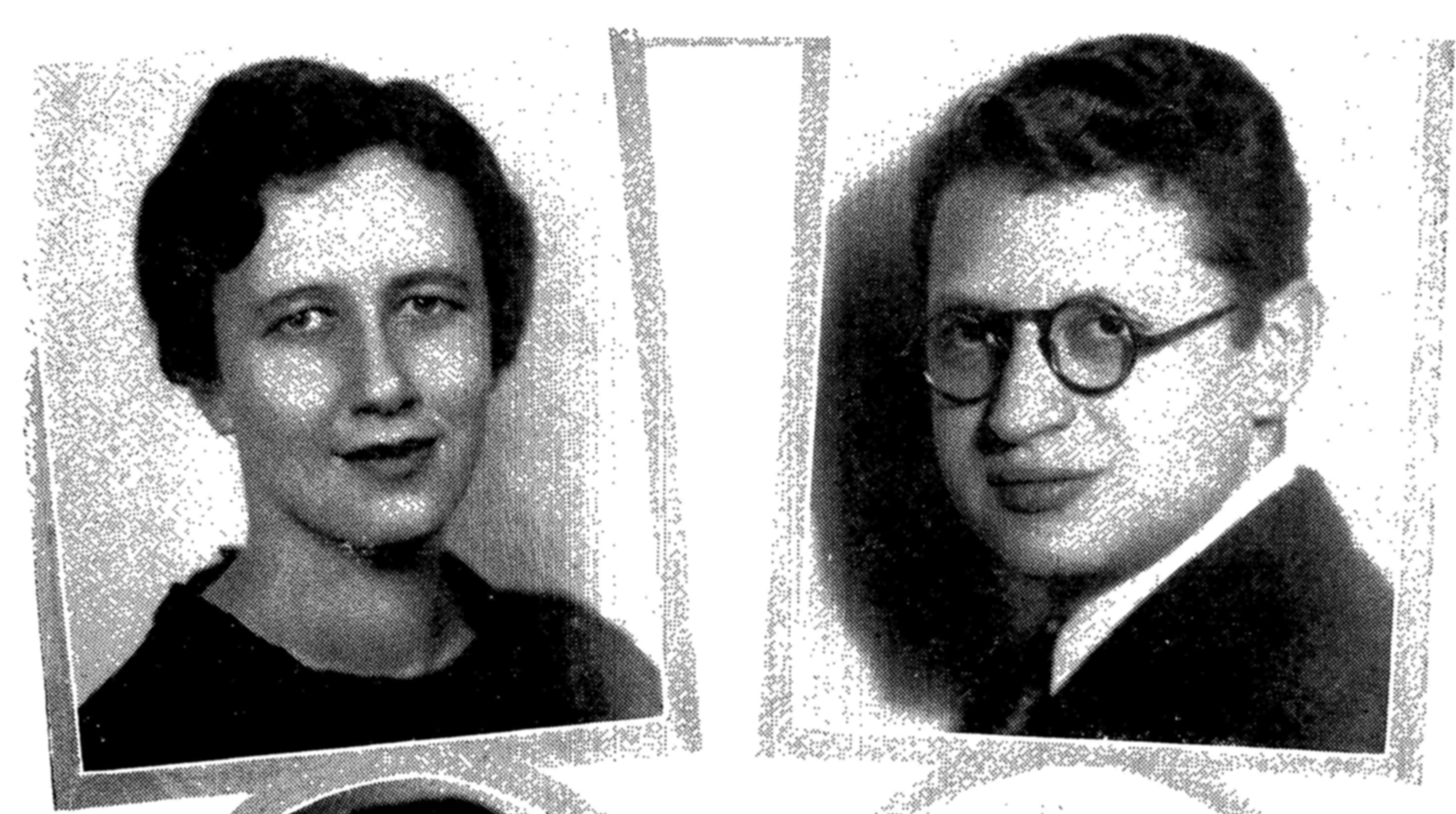
Bromberg's parents, May (née Vladeck) and Norbert, c. 1935

Bromberg was born to a Jewish family in Philadelphia and raised in Tarrytown, New York. He is the grandson of labor leader and politician Baruch Charney Vladeck. He attended Columbia College of Columbia University in the 1960s, studying guitar with Reverend Gary Davis during that time.

== Musical career ==
Bromberg soon established himself as a solo performer and accompanist on the mid-1960s Greenwich Village folk circuit.

Proficient on fiddle, many styles of acoustic and electric guitar, pedal steel guitar and dobro, Bromberg gained a reputation through his session work for artists such as Jerry Jeff Walker and Bob Dylan. He contributed to the latter's 1970 albums Self Portrait and New Morning, and was one of Dylan's preferred musicians. That same year, he backed folk singer Rosalie Sorrels at the Isle of Wight Festival and then performed an impromptu solo set. The success of this appearance led to his being offered a recording contract with Columbia Records.

Bromberg's debut album, David Bromberg, released in early 1972, included his composition "Sammy's Song", featuring Dylan on harmonica, and "The Holdup", co-written with George Harrison. Issued as a single, "The Holdup" was a popular choice on U.S. radio; according to a 1998 review in the American roots music magazine No Depression. The song became "perhaps [Bromberg's] best known work". The collaboration also influenced Harrison's development as a slide guitarist, as Bromberg introduced the former Beatle to the dobro.

His seven-minute rendition of "Mr. Bojangles" from 1972's Demon in Disguise, interspersed with tales about traveling with the song's author, Jerry Jeff Walker, earned Bromberg progressive rock radio airplay. In 1973, he played mandolin, dobro, and electric guitar on Jonathan Edwards' album Have a Good Time for Me.

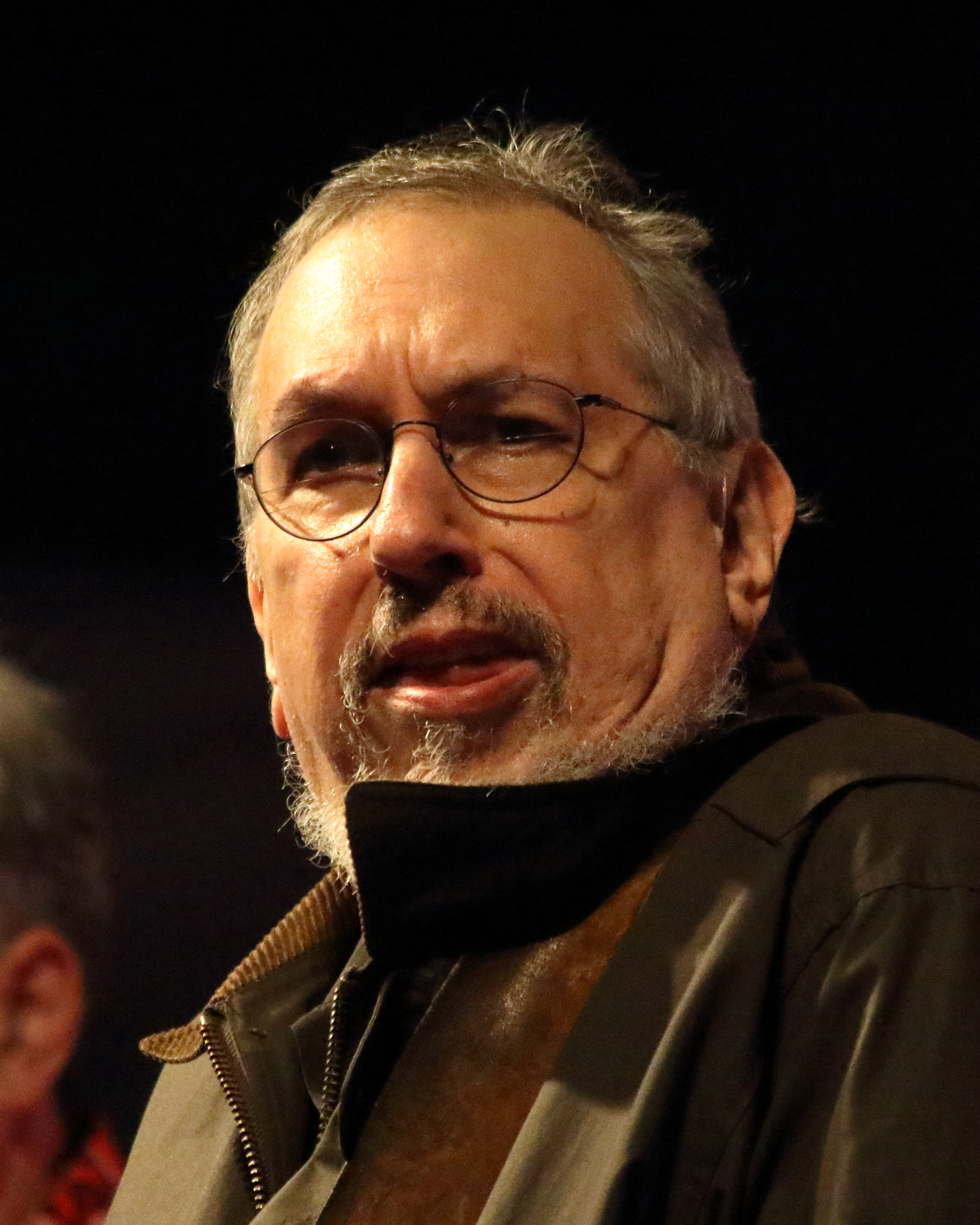
Bromberg in 2018

Bromberg released Try Me One More Time in 2007, his first studio recording since 1990. It included Dylan's "It Takes a Lot to Laugh, It Takes a Train to Cry" and Elizabeth Cotten's "Shake Sugaree". The album was nominated for a Grammy Award in the category of Best Traditional Folk Album at the 50th annual Grammy Awards in 2008. His 2011 album Use Me features guest appearances by Levon Helm, John Hiatt, Tim O'Brien, Dr. John, Keb' Mo', Los Lobos, Widespread Panic, Linda Ronstadt, and Vince Gill.

In 2023 Bromberg said that, while he still might play occasional live shows, he would no longer tour with his Big Band. On June 10, 2023, David Bromberg and His Big Band played a farewell concert at the Beacon Theatre in New York City.

== Personal life ==
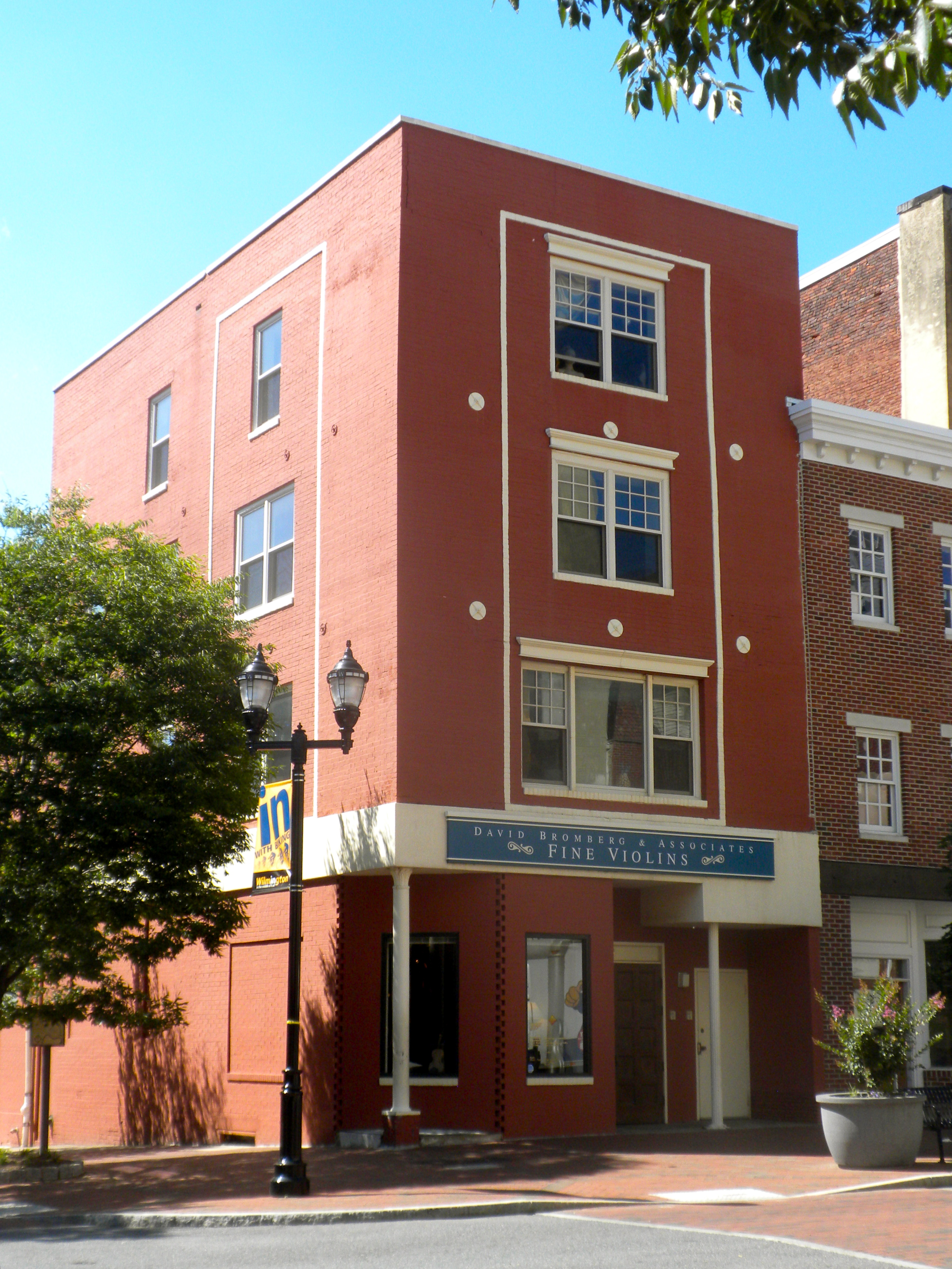
David Bromberg and Associates Fine Violins

Bromberg lives in Wilmington, Delaware, with his wife, artist Nancy Josephson. For some years they owned an extensive violin sales and repair shop, David Bromberg Fine Violins. They sold the shop at the end of 2021. Bromberg occasionally performs at Wilmington's Grand Opera House, where he and his wife are major donors. For six years, ending in May 2017, he sometimes performed at the new World Cafe Live Wilmington, in The Queen Theater.

== Discography ==
=== As a solo artist or band leader ===
LPs and CDs:

- David Bromberg (1972)
- Demon in Disguise (1972)
- Wanted Dead or Alive (1974)
- Midnight on the Water (1975)
- How Late'll Ya Play 'Til? (1976)
- Reckless Abandon (1977)
- Out of the Blues: The Best of David Bromberg (1977)
- Bandit in a Bathing Suit (1978)
- My Own House (1978)
- You Should See the Rest of the Band (1980)
- Long Way from Here (1986)
- Sideman Serenade (1989)
- The Player: A Retrospective (1998)
- Try Me One More Time (2007)
- Live: New York City 1982 (2008)
- Use Me (2011)
- Only Slightly Mad (2013)
- The Blues, the Whole Blues, and Nothing But the Blues (2016)
- Big Road (2020)

DVDs:

- The Guitar Artistry of David Bromberg: Demon in Disguise (2008)
- A Guitar Lesson with David Bromberg (2009)
- David Bromberg and His Big Band In Concert at the Count Basie Theatre, Red Bank, NJ. (2009)

MP3s:

- The David Bromberg Quartet at MerleFest, April 29, 2006 (2006)
- David Bromberg & Angel Band at Philadelphia Folk Festival, August 16, 2007 (2007)
- The David Bromberg Quartet at MerleFest, April 25, 2009 (2009)

=== With other artists ===
David Bromberg has contributed musically to many albums by other musicians and bands. This is a partial list of those recordings.

- Psychedelic Moods – The Deep (1966)
- Psychedelic Psoul – The Freak Scene (1967)
- Mr. Bojangles – Jerry Jeff Walker (1968)
- Driftin' Way of Life – Jerry Jeff Walker (1969)
- Sanders' Truck Stop – Ed Sanders (1969)
- Things I Notice Now – Tom Paxton (1969)
- Easy Does It – Al Kooper (1970)
- Stonehenge – Richie Havens (1970)
- Tom Paxton 6 – Tom Paxton (1970)
- Tom Rush – Tom Rush (1970)
- Woodsmoke and Oranges – Paul Siebel (1970)
- Wrong End of the Rainbow – Tom Rush (1970)
- Self Portrait – Bob Dylan (1970)
- New Morning – Bob Dylan (1970)
- Jack-Knife Gypsy – Paul Siebel (1970)
- Buzzy Linhart Is Music – Buzzy Linhart (1971)
- Sha Na Na – Sha Na Na (1971)
- Carly Simon – Carly Simon (1971)
- Blue River – Eric Andersen (1972)
- Diamonds in the Rough – John Prine (1972)
- Dobro – Mike Auldridge (1972)
- Jerry Jeff Walker – Jerry Jeff Walker (1972)
- Old Dan's Records – Gordon Lightfoot (1972)
- Subway Night – David Amram (1972)
- Be What You Want To – Link Wray (1973)
- All American Boy – Rick Derringer (1973)
- Breezy Stories – Danny O'Keefe (1973)
- Garland Jeffreys – Garland Jeffreys (1973)
- Shotgun Willie – Willie Nelson (1973)
- Have a Good Time for Me – Jonathan Edwards (1973)
- Somebody Else's Troubles – Steve Goodman (1973)
- That's Enough for Me – Peter Yarrow (1973)
- Full Moon – Kris Kristofferson and Rita Coolidge (1973)
- Texas Tornado – Doug Sahm (1973)
- Ringo – Ringo Starr (1973)
- Blues and Bluegrass – Mike Auldridge (1974)
- Phoebe Snow – Phoebe Snow (1974)
- Shankar Family & Friends – Ravi Shankar (1974)
- Johnny Shines & Co., Vol. 2 – Johnny Shines (1974)
- One of These Nights – The Eagles (1975)
- Hillbilly Jazz – Vassar Clements (1975)
- Tales from the Ozone – Commander Cody and His Lost Planet Airmen (1975)
- It Looks Like Snow – Phoebe Snow (1976)
- Took a Long Time – Magna Carta (1977)
- Goodbye Blues – Country Joe McDonald (1977)
- Ringo the 4th – Ringo Starr (1977)
- Live at McCabes – Paul Siebel (1978)
- Even a Gray Day – Tom Paxton (1983)
- Red to Blue – Leon Redbone (1985)
- I've Got a Rock in My Sock – Rory Block (1986)
- Best Blues and Originals – Rory Block (1987)
- Jim Post & Friends – Jim Post (1987)
- John Prine Live – John Prine (1988)
- Murder of Crows – Joe Henry (1989)
- Mr. Cover Shaker – Johnny Shines (1992)
- Picture Perfect Morning – Edie Brickell (1993)
- Catfish for Supper – Jon Sholle (1996)
- Relax Your Mind – Jay Ungar (2003)
- My Last Go Round – Rosalie Sorrels (2004)
- The Bootleg Series Vol. 8 – Tell Tale Signs: Rare and Unreleased 1989–2006 – Bob Dylan (2008)
- King Wilkie Presents: The Wilkie Family Singers – King Wilkie (2009)
- Bless My Sole – Angel Band (2010)
- All My Friends Are Here – Arif Mardin (2010)
- First Came Memphis Minnie – various artists (2012)
- Love for Levon: A Benefit to Save the Barn – various artists (2013)
- The Bootleg Series Vol. 10 – Another Self Portrait – Bob Dylan (2013)
- Live at Caffè Lena: Music From America's Legendary Coffeehouse (1967–2013) – various artists (2013)

== Other sources ==
- "David Bromberg Quintet to Perform in Annapolis". Jmoreliving.com. January 23, 2019.
