= Appleseed Recordings =

American record label

- Founded: 1997
- Founder: Jim Musselman
- Distributor: eOne Entertainment
- Genre: Folk
- Country of origin: U.S.
- Location: West Chester, Pennsylvania
- Official website: www.appleseedmusic.com

Appleseed Recordings is an American folk music record label founded by Jim Musselman in 1997.

== History ==
Appleseed's first album was a tribute to Peter Seeger. Musselman approached musicians and others (writer Studs Terkel, actor Tim Robbins) to record a song written, adapted, or performed by Seeger. The result was Where Have All the Flowers Gone: The Songs of Pete Seeger. The album included versions of Seeger-related songs by Bruce Springsteen, Jackson Browne & Joan Baez, Judy Collins, Terkel, Robbins, and Ani DiFranco. The album won the American Federation of Independent Music Award for Top Independent Release of 1998". The duet by Jackson Browne and Bonnie Raitt on "Kisses Sweeter than Wine" was nominated for a 1999 Grammy Award for Best Pop Collaboration with Vocals.

In 2007, Appleseed worked with the Give Us Your Poor organization at UMass Boston to release Give Us Your Poor to raise funds and public awareness about homelessness in America. Among its exclusive tracks was the first collaboration between Bruce Springsteen and Pete Seeger.

== Heritage artists ==
Many formerly high-profile musicians from the Sixties and Seventies have had their first studio recordings in years, sometimes decades, released on the Appleseed label. The worldwide icon of the spirit of the Sixties, Donovan, came to Appleseed to release his first CD in eight years, 2004's Beat Cafe. Tom Rush, one of the first artists to record songs by Joni Mitchell, Jackson Browne and James Taylor, returned to the recording studio for the first time in 35 years and emerged with What I Know, his Appleseed debut, which was named 2009 Album of the Year by the International Folk Alliance organization based on airplay. David Bromberg had retired from recording in 1990 before cutting Try Me One More Time for Appleseed in 2007; the CD was nominated for a Grammy Award for Best Traditional Folk Album. The Native American singer/songwriter/artist/activist Buffy Sainte-Marie released Running for the Drum, her first new CD in 13 years, on Appleseed in 2009. Jesse Winchester, another well-established performer from the Sixties, hadn't released a new studio album in ten years before 2009's Love Filling Station was issued by Appleseed. His CD was named one of the year's best by VH1's Bill Flanagan on the CBS Sunday Morning television show,

== Historical releases ==
Some of the label's other releases were intended to keep important traditional music alive, such as Kim and Reggie Harris's Steal Away: Songs of the Underground Railroad and Get On Board: Underground Railroad & Civil Rights Freedom Songs, Vol. 2, which have been used as teaching tools by various black history museums and schools. In 2000, Appleseed released two discs of "field recordings" of traditional American folk songs collected by Anne and Frank Warner on trips down the Eastern Seaboard starting in 1938, Her Bright Smile Haunts Me Still and Nothing Seems Better to Me: The Music of Frank Proffitt and North Carolina.

To celebrate its ten-year anniversary in 2007, Appleseed issued Sowing the Seeds – The 10th Anniversary, a two-CD sampler of catalogue highlights that also included exclusive new recordings by Pete Seeger & Bruce Springsteen (a second historic second collaboration), Donovan, Ani DiFranco, Kim and Reggie Harris, and several more new Pete tracks.

In early 2009, Appleseed won its first Grammy Award – for Best Traditional Folk Recording for Pete Seeger's 2008 At 89 release.

== Label's mission ==
As a longtime activist who worked with consumer advocate Ralph Nader to champion various safety and environmental causes, including the mandatory installation of airbags in motor vehicles, Musselman finds great satisfaction in combining his commitment to social justice with his passion for music: "I started [Appleseed] because I had seen a void in music tied to social justice and social change, and also seen people not recording folk songs anymore...I wanted to put out music with a message of hope and healing and to record these folk songs...and we were in danger of them being lost forever...I think music can reach people in ways that other mediums can't. Music touches an emotional chord in someone and tends to speak to people in a lot of ways...Music can break down walls and build bridges between people with different political and social views."

== Roster ==
The Appleseed catalog includes music by Eric Andersen, David Bromberg, Johnny Clegg, Donovan, Ramblin' Jack Elliott, Tim Eriksen, Dick Gaughan, John Wesley Harding, Kim and Reggie Harris, Christine Lavin, Roger McGuinn, Holly Near, Tom Paxton, Tom Rush, Buffy Sainte-Marie, Tommy Sands, Pete Seeger, Al Stewart, John Stewart, Sweet Honey in the Rock, Lizzie West, and Jesse Winchester.

== See also ==
- List of record labels
