= Diana Krall discography =

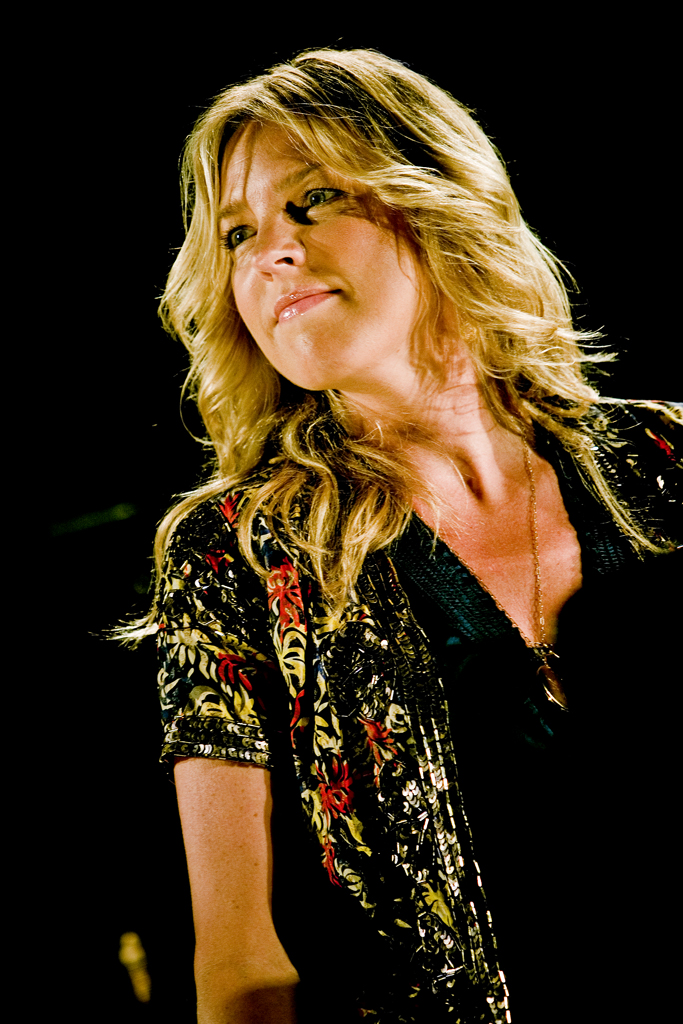
- Krall performing at the EDP Cool Jazz festival in Oeiras, Portugal, in July 2008
- Studio albums: 15
- Extended plays: 1
- Live albums: 1
- Compilation albums: 1
- Singles: 4
- Video albums: 3
- Music videos: 7
- Promotional singles: 16

Canadian singer Diana Krall has released 15 studio albums, one live album, one compilation album, one extended play, four singles, 16 promotional singles, three video albums, and seven music videos. Throughout her career, Krall has won numerous awards and has sold 16 million albums, establishing herself as one of the best-selling artists of her time.

== Albums ==
=== Studio albums ===
List of studio albums, with selected chart positions and certifications
Title	Details	Peak chart positions										Certifications
Title	Details	CAN	AUS	AUT	FRA	GER	NOR	NZ	SWI	UK	US	Certifications
Stepping Out	Released: 1993; Label: Justin Time; Formats: CD, cassette	—	—	—	—	—	—	—	—	—	—	MC: Gold
Only Trust Your Heart	Released: February 14, 1995; Label: GRP; Format: CD	—	—	—	—	—	—	—	—	—	—	
All for You: A Dedication to the Nat King Cole Trio	Released: March 12, 1996; Label: Impulse!, GRP; Format: CD, LP, cassette	—	—	—	—	—	—	—	—	—	—	MC: Gold; RIAA: Gold
Love Scenes	Released: August 26, 1997; Label: Impulse!; Formats: CD, SA-CD, LP, DVD-Audio, cassette	47	—	—	35	—	—	45	—	152	109	MC: 2× Platinum; RIAA: Platinum
When I Look in Your Eyes	Released: June 8, 1999; Label: Verve; Formats: CD, SA-CD, LP, DVD-Audio, cassette	12	72	—	17	—	—	28	—	72	56	MC: 3× Platinum; BPI: Silver; RIAA: Platinum; SNEP: Gold
The Look of Love	Released: September 18, 2001; Label: Verve; Formats: CD, SA-CD, LP, DVD-Audio, Blu-ray Audio, cassette	1	7	15	5	15	15	6	29	23	9	MC: 7× Platinum; ARIA: Platinum; BPI: Gold; IFPI AUT: Gold; IFPI SWI: Gold; RIAA: Platinum; RMNZ: Platinum; SNEP: Platinum
The Girl in the Other Room	Released: April 27, 2004; Label: Verve; Formats: CD, SA-CD, DualDisc, LP digital download	1	21	3	2	7	2	5	7	4	4	MC: 2× Platinum; ARIA: Gold; BPI: Gold; BVMI: Gold; IFPI AUT: Gold; IFPI SWI: Gold; RMNZ: Platinum; RIAA: Gold
Christmas Songs (featuring the Clayton-Hamilton Jazz Orchestra)	Released: November 1, 2005; Label: Verve; Formats: CD, LP, digital download	2	—	27	52	34	16	—	28	155	17	MC: 2× Platinum; RIAA: Gold
From This Moment On	Released: September 19, 2006; Label: Verve; Formats: CD, LP, digital download	1	28	15	6	16	17	17	15	29	7	MC: 2× Platinum
Quiet Nights	Released: March 31, 2009; Label: Verve; Formats: CD, LP, digital download	2	14	3	3	7	2	2	10	11	3	ARIA: Gold; IFPI AUT: Gold; RMNZ: Gold; SNEP: Gold
Glad Rag Doll	Released: October 2, 2012; Label: Verve; Formats: CD, LP, digital download	2	44	8	3	17	21	19	13	21	6	MC: Gold; SNEP: Gold
Wallflower	Released: February 3, 2015; Label: Verve; Formats: CD, SA-CD, LP, digital download	2	7	5	4	9	4	9	5	19	10	MC: Platinum
Turn Up the Quiet	Release: May 5, 2017; Label: Verve; Formats: CD, SA-CD, LP, digital download	8	37	5	10	16	15	13	10	32	18	
Love Is Here to Stay (with Tony Bennett)	Released: September 14, 2018; Label: Verve, Columbia; Formats: CD, LP, digital download	19	30	4	40	20	—	—	12	33	11	
This Dream of You	Released: September 25, 2020; Label: Verve, Columbia; Formats: CD, LP, digital download	82	—	15	36	30	—	—	13	— (Note: This Dream of You did not enter the UK Albums Chart, but peaked at number 65 on the UK Album Downloads Chart.)	— (Note: This Dream of You did not enter the Billboard 200, but peaked at number 23 on the Current Album Sales chart.)	
"—" denotes a recording that did not chart or was not released in that territory.

=== Live albums ===
List of live albums, with selected chart positions and certifications
Title	Details	Peak chart positions										Certifications
Title	Details	CAN	AUS	AUT	FRA	GER	NOR	NZ	SWI	UK	US	Certifications
Live in Paris	Released: October 1, 2002; Label: Verve; Formats: CD, SA-CD, LP, digital download	3	41	19	23	53	5	6	30	30	18	MC: 2× Platinum; ARIA: Gold; BPI: Silver; RIAA: Gold

=== Compilation albums ===
List of compilation albums, with selected chart positions and certifications
Title	Details	Peak chart positions										Certifications
Title	Details	CAN	AUS	AUT	FRA	GER	NOR	NZ	SWI	UK	US	Certifications
The Very Best of Diana Krall	Released: September 18, 2007; Label: Verve; Formats: CD, LP, digital download	6	40	36	— (Note: The Very Best of Diana Krall did not enter the French Albums Chart, but peaked at number nine on the French Compilation Albums Chart.)	52	6	17	25	35	19	MC: Platinum
"—" denotes a recording that did not chart or was not released in that territory.

== Extended plays ==
List of extended plays, with selected chart positions, showing year released and album name
Title	Details	Peak chart positions		
Title	Details	US Heat.	US Hol.	US Jazz
Have Yourself a Merry Little Christmas	Released: November 3, 1998; Label: Impulse!, GRP; Format: CD	17	35	3

== Singles ==
List of singles, with selected chart positions, showing year released and album name
Title	Year	Peak chart positions		Album
Title	Year	BEL (FL) Tip	UK	Album
"Why Should I Care"	1999	—	—	When I Look in Your Eyes
"Temptation"	2004	—	—	The Girl in the Other Room
"Narrow Daylight"	2004	—	87	The Girl in the Other Room
"There Ain't No Sweet Man That's Worth the Salt of My Tears"	2012	47	—	Glad Rag Doll
"—" denotes a recording that did not chart or was not released in that territory.

=== Promotional singles ===
List of promotional singles, with selected chart positions, showing year released and album name
Title	Year	Peaks	Album
Title	Year	US AC	Album
"Hit That Jive Jack"	1996	—	All for You: A Dedication to the Nat King Cole Trio
"Let's Face the Music and Dance"	1999	—	When I Look in Your Eyes
"S'Wonderful"	2001	—	The Look of Love
"Cry Me a River"	2001	—	The Look of Love
"The Look of Love"	2001	22	The Look of Love
"Just the Way You Are"	2001	—	Live in Paris
"Let's Fall in Love"	2002	—	Live in Paris
"A Case of You"	2002	—	Live in Paris
"Jingle Bells"	2005	5	Christmas Songs
"White Christmas"	2005	—	Christmas Songs
"From This Moment On"	2006	—	From This Moment On
"The Heart of Saturday Night"	2007	—	The Very Best of Diana Krall
"The Boy from Ipanema"	2009	—	Quiet Nights
"Don't Dream It's Over"	2014	—	Wallflower
"If I Take You Home Tonight"	2015	—	Wallflower
"Desperado"	2015		Wallflower
"—" denotes a recording that did not chart or was not released in that territory.

== Other charted songs ==
List of other charted songs, with selected chart positions, showing year released and album name
Title	Year	Peak chart positions					Album
Title	Year	CAN Dig.	BEL (FL)	FRA	SPA	US Jazz	Album
"I'll Be Home for Christmas"	2007	72	—	—	—	—	Christmas Songs
"Walk On By"	2009	—	36	—	—	—	Quiet Nights
"We Just Couldn't Say Goodbye"	2012	—	—	195	—	—	Glad Rag Doll
"Just Like a Butterfly That's Caught in the Rain"	2012	—	—	—	—	16	Glad Rag Doll
"Alone Again (Naturally)" (duet with Michael Bublé)	2015	—	—	128	46	—	Wallflower
"California Dreamin'"	2015	—	—	73	—	—	Wallflower
"I'm Not in Love"	2015	—	—	136	—	—	Wallflower
"Sorry Seems to Be the Hardest Word"	2015	—	—	171	—	—	Wallflower
"I Can't Tell You Why"	2015	—	—	—	—	10	Wallflower
"—" denotes a recording that did not chart or was not released in that territory.

== Guest appearances ==
List of non-single guest appearances, with other performing artists, showing year released and album name
Title	Year	Other artist(s)	Album
"Fresh Out of Love"	1996	Benny Carter	Songbook
"Echo of My Dream"	1997	Benny Carter	Songbook Volume II
"Dreamsville"	1997	Dave Grusin	Two for the Road
"Soldier in the Rain"	1997	Dave Grusin	Two for the Road
"The Nearness of You"	1997	Geoffrey Keezer	Turn Up the Quiet
"Island Palace"	1997	Geoffrey Keezer	Turn Up the Quiet
"Love Dance"	1997	Geoffrey Keezer	Turn Up the Quiet
"Midnight Sun"	1997	None	Midnight in the Garden of Good and Evil: Music from and Inspired by the Motion Picture
"La Vie en rose"	1998	Toots Thielemans	Chez Toots
"I Thought About You"	1998	Ray Brown	Some of My Best Friends Are...Singers
"Little Boy"	1998	Ray Brown	Some of My Best Friends Are...Singers
"Danny Boy"	1999	The Chieftains	Tears of Stone
"Boy from Ipanema"	2000	Rosemary Clooney	Brazil
"Let's Get Lost"	2001	Terence Blanchard	Let's Get Lost
"Alright, Okay, You Win"	2001	Tony Bennett	Playin' with My Friends: Bennett Sings the Blues
"I Should Care"	2002	None	The Man Behind the Music
"Morning Has Broken"	2002	The Chieftains, Art Garfunkel	The Wide World Over
"Better Than Anything"	2002	Natalie Cole	Ask a Woman Who Knows
"Crazy"	2003	Willie Nelson, Elvis Costello	Live and Kickin'
"You Don't Know Me"	2004	Ray Charles	Genius Loves Company
"The Best Is Yet to Come"	2006	Tony Bennett	Duets: An American Classic
"Christmas Time Is Here"	2006	Sarah McLachlan	Wintersong
"Faint of Heart"	2006	Vince Gill	These Days
"Dream a Little Dream of Me"	2007	Hank Jones	We All Love Ella: Celebrating the First Lady of Song
"Have Yourself a Merry Little Christmas"	2008	Anne Murray	Anne Murray's Christmas Album
"You Couldn't Be Cuter"	2008	Yo-Yo Ma	Songs of Joy & Peace
"Bye Bye Blackbird"	2009	None	Public Enemies: Original Motion Picture Soundtrack
"If I Had You"	2009	Willie Nelson	American Classic
"Goodbye"	2010	Charlie Haden Quartet West	Sophisticated Ladies
"Simple Twist of Fate"	2012	None	Chimes of Freedom

== Other credits ==
Title	Year	Artist	Album	Credit(s)
"Blue Christmas"	1998	Celine Dion	These Are Special Times	Acoustic piano
All songs	2002	Vince Benedetti	Heartdrops	Vocals, piano
All songs	2009	Barbra Streisand	Love Is the Answer	Production
"In the Wee Small Hours of the Morning"	2009	Barbra Streisand	Love Is the Answer	Piano
"Gentle Rain"	2009	Barbra Streisand	Love Is the Answer	Piano
"If You Go Away (Ne me quitte pas)"	2009	Barbra Streisand	Love Is the Answer	Piano
"Here's That Rainy Day"	2009	Barbra Streisand	Love Is the Answer	Piano
"Love Dance"	2009	Barbra Streisand	Love Is the Answer	Piano
All songs except "Only Our Hearts"	2012	Paul McCartney	Kisses on the Bottom	Piano, rhythm arrangement

== Videography ==
=== Video albums ===
List of video albums, with selected certifications
Title	Details	Certifications
Live in Paris	Released: April 2, 2002; Label: Verve; Formats: DVD, Blu-ray	MC: 6× Platinum; ARIA: Platinum; RIAA: 2× Platinum
Live at the Montreal Jazz Festival	Released: November 23, 2004; Label: Verve; Format: DVD	MC: 3× Platinum; SNEP: Gold
Live in Rio	Released: May 26, 2009; Label: Verve; Format: DVD, Blu-ray	MC: 2× Platinum; RIAA: Gold

=== Music videos ===
Title	Year	Director(s)
"Let's Face the Music and Dance"	1999	Unknown
"The Look of Love"	2001	Unknown
"Just the Way You Are"	2002	Unknown
"Narrow Daylight"	2004	Unknown
"Almost Blue"	2004	Unknown
"Jingle Bells"	2005	Unknown
"Quiet Nights"	2009	Unknown
