= Have Yourself a Merry Little Christmas (EP) =

EP by Diana Krall
- Released: November 3, 1998
- Recorded: August 20 – September 19, 1998
- Studio: Capitol (Hollywood, California); Schnee (North Hollywood, California)
- Genre: Jazz; Christmas
- Length: 10:11
- Label: Impulse!; GRP
- Producer: Tommy LiPuma; Johnny Mandel

Diana Krall chronology
Love Scenes (1997)	Have Yourself a Merry Little Christmas (1998)	When I Look in Your Eyes (1999)

Have Yourself a Merry Little Christmas is a Christmas extended play (EP) by Canadian singer Diana Krall, released on November 3, 1998, by Impulse! Records and GRP Records.

== Critical reception ==
Professional ratings
Review scores
Source	Rating
AllMusic	3/5 stars

Marvin Jolly of AllMusic wrote in his review, "The distanced cool of Diana Krall's vocals lends itself well to the wintry flavor of the three holiday favorites which comprise her Have Yourself a Merry Little Christmas EP."

== Track listing ==
No.	Title	Writer(s)	Length
1.	"Have Yourself a Merry Little Christmas"	Ralph Blane; Hugh Martin	4:20
2.	"Christmas Time Is Here"	Vince Guaraldi; Lee Mendelson	3:35
3.	"Jingle Bells"	James Lord Pierpont	2:16
Total length:			10:11

Track information and credits adapted from the album's liner notes.

== Musicians ==
- Diana Krall – piano, vocals
- Jeff Hamilton – drums
- Russell Malone – guitar
- Ben Wolfe – bass
- Johnny Mandel – conductor, orchestral arrangements

== Production ==
- Tommy LiPuma – Producer
- Johnny Mandel – Producer
- Doug Sax – Mastering
- Al Schmitt – Engineer, Mixing
- Koji Egawa – Assistant Engineer
- Steve Genewick – Assistant Engineer
- Bill Smith – Assistant Engineer
- Marsha Black – Production Coordination
- Hollis King – Art Direction
- Kazumi Matsumoto – Graphic Design
- Nigel Parry – Photography

== Charts ==
=== Weekly charts ===
Chart (1998)	Peak position
US Heatseekers Albums (Billboard)	17
US Top Holiday Albums (Billboard)	35
US Top Jazz Albums (Billboard)	3
US Traditional Jazz Albums (Billboard)	2

=== Year-end charts ===
Chart (1999)	Position
US Top Jazz Albums (Billboard)	14
