= Turn Up the Quiet =

Studio album by Diana Krall
- Released: May 5, 2017
- Recorded: Fall 2016
- Studio: Capitol (Hollywood, California)
- Genre: Jazz
- Length: 48:18
- Label: Verve
- Producer: Tommy LiPuma; Diana Krall

Diana Krall chronology
Wallflower (2015)	Turn Up the Quiet (2017)	Love Is Here to Stay (2018)

Turn Up the Quiet is the thirteenth studio album by Canadian singer Diana Krall, released on May 5, 2017, by Verve Records.

== Background ==
The album consists of 11 jazz standards. The Japanese edition of the album includes "How Deep Is the Ocean" as a bonus track. Krall explained: "I have thought about these songs for a long time. Being in the company of some of my greatest friends in music allowed me to tell these stories just as I'd intended. Sometimes you just have to turn up the quiet to be heard a little better." Alan Broadbent conducts three tracks on the album that reunites Krall with Christian McBride and Russell Malone for some compositions along with drummer Jeff Hamilton and bass player John Clayton Jr., the latter credited together with Krall on her 2005 album Christmas Songs. Turn Up the Quiet also marks her last album with her longtime producer and friend Tommy LiPuma, who died in March 2017. LiPuma first worked with Krall on her second studio album, Only Trust Your Heart (1995).

== Tour ==
In support of the album, Krall embarked on the Turn Up the Quiet World Tour, which began on June 2, 2017, in Minneapolis and concluded on November 4, 2018, in Costa Mesa, California.

== Critical reception ==
Professional ratings
Aggregate scores
Source	Rating
AnyDecentMusic?	6.7/10
Metacritic	71/100
Review scores
Source	Rating
AllMusic	3.5/5 stars
Daily Express	4/5
Elmore Magazine	92/100
Evening Standard	4/5 stars
The New Zealand Herald	5/5 stars
The Plain Dealer	A
The Press	4/5 stars
Renowned for Sound	3/5 stars
Slant Magazine	3/5 stars
Uncut	3/5 stars

At Metacritic, which assigns a normalized rating out of 100 to reviews from mainstream critics, the album received an average score of 71, based on four reviews, which indicates "generally favorable reviews". At AnyDecentMusic?, which collects critical reviews from more than 50 media sources, the album scored 6.7 points out of 10, based on five reviews.

Christopher Loudon of Jazz Times stated, "Playing and singing on all tracks and reunited with co-producer Tommy LiPuma, who died weeks before the project's release, Diana Krall is in the mellowest of moods. She rarely raises her voice above a whisper, her self-accompaniment equally restrained. Even tunes typically handled with plenty of zest and verve—'Blue Skies,' 'L-O-V-E,' 'Sway'—are winningly tempered. Vocally she's grown a shade duskier, a degree or two grainier and, in the process, more enticing, more alluring." Maertin Townsend of the Daily Express called the album a "spacious, unhurried gem of a record".

Bobby Reed of DownBeat wrote, "For this album, Krall selected the songs, wrote the ensemble arrangements and oversaw three different ensemble lineups. At this point in her career, Krall knows how to put her own distinctive stamp on decades-old standards, making them sound fresh and vibrant, while still honoring the melodies that Great American Songbook fans know so well." Jim Hynes of Elmore Magazine commented "Put your headphones on at night and listen to the finesse and nuance of Krall here in the quiet. You can't help but be impressed".

Clint Rhodes of The Herald-Standard commented, "The talented singer's style is perfect for creating an intimate mood for a quiet dinner for two or a casual gathering of a few close friends. Rotating recording performances between a trio, quartet and quintet, the arrangements possess a sense of improvisation that evokes a live vibe throughout the set... Next time you feel the pressures of the day starting to build, take some time to escape to your patio, back porch, comfortable easy chair or special secluded place and lose yourself in the welcoming oasis created by Krall. The quiet has never sounded so good."

== Track listing ==
No.	Title	Writer(s)	Length
1.	"Like Someone in Love"	James Van Heusen; Johnny Burke	3:16
2.	"Isn't It Romantic?"	Richard Rodgers; Lorenz Hart	4:29
3.	"L-O-V-E"	Bert Kaempfert; Milt Gabler	4:21
4.	"Night and Day"	Cole Porter	4:39
5.	"I'm Confessin' (That I Love You)"	Ralph Edward 'Doc' Daugherty; Al J. Neiburg; Ellis Reynolds	3:24
6.	"Moonglow"	Irving Mills; Edgar Delange; Will Hudson	5:15
7.	"Blue Skies"	Irving Berlin	4:39
8.	"Sway"	Norman Gimbel; Pablo Rosas Rodriguez; Luis Demetrio; Traconis Molina	6:13
9.	"No Moon at All"	Redd Evans; David A. Mann	4:06
10.	"Dream"	John H. Mercer	4:05
11.	"I'll See You in My Dreams"	Gus Kahn; Isham Jones	3:51
Total length:			48:18

Japanese edition bonus track
No.	Title	Writer(s)	Length
12.	"How Deep Is the Ocean"	Irving Berlin	5:16
Total length:			53:34

== Personnel ==
Credits adapted from the liner notes of Turn Up the Quiet.

=== Studios ===
- Capitol Studios (Hollywood, California) – recording, mixing
- Germano Studios (New York City) – additional engineering (track 2)
- The Bakery (Culver City, California) – mastering

=== Musicians ===
- Diana Krall – piano, vocals, ensemble arrangements
- Christian McBride – bass (tracks 1, 7, 10)
- Russell Malone – guitar (tracks 1, 7, 10)
- John Clayton Jr. – bass (tracks 2–4, 8, 9)
- Jeff Hamilton – drums (tracks 2–4, 8)
- Anthony Wilson – guitar (tracks 2–4, 8)
- Stefon Harris – vibraphone (track 2)
- Joel Derouin – concertmaster (tracks 2, 4, 8, 10)
- Charlie Bisharat, Mario DeLeon, Kevin Connolly, Neel Hammond, Tamara Hatwan, Natalie Leggett, Songa Lee, Katia Popov, Michele Richards, Kathleen Sloan, Marcy Vaj, Ina Veli, John Wittenberg – violins (tracks 2, 4, 8, 10)
- Andrew Duckles, Kathryn Reddish, Colleen Sugata, Michael Whitson – violas (tracks 2, 4, 8, 10)
- Jodi Burnett, Alisha Bauer, Jeniffer Kuhn – celli (tracks 2, 4, 8, 10)
- Vanessa Freebairn-Smith – cello (tracks 2, 4, 8, 10); cello solo (track 10)
- Alan Broadbent – orchestration, orchestral arrangements, conducting (tracks 2, 4, 8, 10)
- Tony Garnier – bass (tracks 5, 6, 11)
- Karriem Riggins – drums (tracks 5, 6, 11)
- Marc Ribot – guitar (tracks 5, 6, 11)
- Stuart Duncan – fiddle (tracks 5, 6, 11)

=== Technical ===
- Tommy LiPuma – production
- Diana Krall – production
- Al Schmitt – recording, mixing
- Shari Sutcliffe – contractor, production coordination
- Steve Genewick – engineering assistance, Pro Tools editing
- Brian Montgomery – additional engineering (track 2)
- Chandler Harrod – engineering assistance
- Jason Staniulis – engineering assistance
- Chie Imaizumi – copyist
- Terry Woodson – copyist
- Neema Pazargad – piano tuning
- Oleg Schramm – piano tuning
- Eric Boulanger – mastering

=== Artwork ===
- Josh Cheuse – creative direction
- Coco Shinomiya – design
- Edwin Fotheringham – label illustration
- Mary McCartney – photography

== Charts ==
=== Weekly charts ===
Chart (2017–2018)	Peak position
Australian Albums (ARIA)	37
Australian Jazz & Blues Albums (ARIA)	1
Austrian Albums (Ö3 Austria)	5
Belgian Albums (Ultratop Flanders)	11
Belgian Albums (Ultratop Wallonia)	10
Canadian Albums (Billboard)	8
Croatian International Albums (HDU)	11
Czech Albums (ČNS IFPI)	9
Danish Albums (Hitlisten)	23
Dutch Albums (Album Top 100)	32
French Albums (SNEP)	4
German Albums (Offizielle Top 100)	16
Greek Albums (IFPI)	31
Hungarian Albums (MAHASZ)	16
Italian Albums (FIMI)	13
Japanese Albums (Oricon)	17
New Zealand Albums (RMNZ)	13
Norwegian Albums (VG-lista)	15
Polish Albums (ZPAV)	10
Portuguese Albums (AFP)	1
Scottish Albums (OCC)	23
Slovak Albums (ČNS IFPI)	9
South Korean Albums (Gaon)	70
Spanish Albums (PROMUSICAE)	16
Swedish Albums (Sverigetopplistan)	49
Swedish Jazz Albums (Sverigetopplistan)	1
Swiss Albums (Schweizer Hitparade)	10
UK Albums (OCC)	32
UK Jazz & Blues Albums (OCC)	1
US Billboard 200	18
US Top Jazz Albums (Billboard)	1
US Traditional Jazz Albums (Billboard)	1

=== Year-end charts ===
Chart (2017)	Position
Australian Jazz & Blues Albums (ARIA)	5
Belgian Albums (Ultratop Flanders)	164
Belgian Albums (Ultratop Wallonia)	125
French Albums (SNEP)	171
US Top Jazz Albums (Billboard)	2

== Certifications ==
Region	Certification	Certified units/sales
France (SNEP)	Gold	50,000^{‡}
Germany (BVMI)	3× Gold	30,000^{‡}
Poland (ZPAV)	Gold	5,000^{‡}
^{‡} Sales+streaming figures based on certification alone.
