= Some of My Best Friends Are...Singers =

Some of My Best Friends Are...singers

Studio album by Ray Brown
- Released: 29 September 1998
- Recorded: 1998
- Genre: Jazz
- Length: 59:00
- Label: Telarc

Ray Brown chronology
Some of My Best Friends Are...singers (1998)	Triple Play (1998)

Professional ratings
Review scores
Source	Rating
Allmusic	4.5/5 stars
The Penguin Guide to Jazz Recordings	3/4 stars

Some of My Best Friends Are...Singers is a 1998 album by double bassist Ray Brown, accompanied by his trio, pianist Geoffrey Keezer and drummer Gregory Hutchinson, with singers Diana Krall, Etta Jones, Dee Dee Bridgewater, Nancy King, Marlena Shaw, and Kevin Mahogany. Guitarist Russell Malone and saxophonists Antonio Hart and Ralph Moore also played.

== Track listing ==
1. "I Thought About You" (James Van Heusen) feat. Diana Krall – 5:22
2. "Poor Butterfly" (Raymond Hubbell) feat. Etta Jones – 3:38
3. "More Than You Know" (Vincent Youmans) feat. Dee Dee Bridgewater – 5:34
4. "Little Boy" (Madeline Hyde and Francis Henry) feat. Diana Krall – 2:27
5. "But Beautiful" (James Van Heusen) feat. Antonio Hart / Nancy King – 5:41
6. "At Long Last Love" (Cole Porter) feat. Marlena Shaw – 3:23
7. "Skylark" (Hoagy Carmichael) feat. Kevin Mahogany / Russell Malone – 6:01
8. "Cherokee" (Ray Noble) feat. Dee Dee Bridgewater / Ralph Moore – 6:20
9. "No Greater Love" (Isham Jones, Marty Symes) feat. Etta Jones / Russell Malone – 4:21
10. "Imagination" (James Van Heusen) feat. Marlena Shaw – 7:21
11. "The Party's Over (Jule Styne feat. Kevin Mahogany – 3:40
12. "The Perfect Blues (Ray Brown) feat. Antonio Hart / Nancy King – 5:15

== Personnel ==
=== Performance ===
- Ray Brown – double bass
- Geoff Keezer – piano
- Gregory Hutchinson – drums
- Antonio Hart – alto saxophone
- Russell Malone – guitar
