= This Dream of You =

Studio album by Diana Krall
- Released: September 25, 2020
- Recorded: 2016–2017
- Studios: Capitol (Hollywood, California) (Note: Tracks 1–4, 6, 7, 9, 11 and 12); Avatar (New York City) (Note: Tracks 5 and 8); Creekside (West Vancouver) (Note: Track 10)
- Genre: Jazz
- Length: 50:45
- Label: Verve
- Producers: Diana Krall; Tommy LiPuma

Diana Krall chronology
Love Is Here to Stay (2018)	This Dream of You (2020)

Singles from This Dream of You
- 1. "How Deep Is the Ocean" Released: August 13, 2020; 2. "I Wished on the Moon" Released: August 27, 2020

This Dream of You is the fifteenth studio album by Canadian singer Diana Krall, released on September 25, 2020, by Verve Records. The album spawned two singles released in August 2020.

== Background ==
The album is named after Krall's rendition of the Bob Dylan song from his album Together Through Life (2009). The release is a collection of Krall's scores of studio recordings that she performed with her longtime producer Tommy LiPuma before his death in 2017. The dozen tracks were selected from over 30 recordings that the pair had laid down. The album was finished in May 2020 and produced by Krall herself. The "Autumn in New York" video was created to raise awareness for New York Cares, the largest volunteer organization in New York City founded in 1987.

== Critical reception ==
Professional ratings
Aggregate scores
Source	Rating
Metacritic	71/100
Review scores
Source	Rating
AllMusic	3/5 stars
American Songwriter	4/5 stars
The Arts Desk	2/5 stars
DownBeat	4/5 stars
Jazz Journal	3/5 stars
Jazzwise	4/5 stars
Le Devoir	3/5 stars
The Observer	4/5 stars
Tom Hull – on the Web	B+

At Metacritic, which assigns a normalized rating out of 100 to reviews from mainstream critics, the album received an average score of 71, based on four reviews, which indicates "generally favorable reviews".

Stephen Thomas Erlewine of AllMusic wrote, "This Dream of You winds up shining a light on the accomplishment of the final album Krall and LiPuma finished in his lifetime. Together, they knew which songs to select to create a complete listen. What remained behind is nice but not quite absorbing." Sebastian Scotney, in his review for The Arts Desk, stated, "Whereas Turn Up The Quiet contained the very best of Krall's sessions in the years before Lipuma passed away, This Dream of You [...], presenting the also-rans, is quite simply not as good... This disappointing album feels like quite the wrong way to be setting the seal on the Krall/LiPuma years. It is to be hoped that she can and will bounce back from it." Glide Magazine's Jim Hynes mentioned, "As one who has many Krall albums, this will undoubtedly satisfy her listeners who came aboard as she was building her career playing standards and those who enjoyed her past two efforts. This Dream of You is a solid entry, though surely not the strongest in her storied catalog."

Lee Zimmerman of American Songwriter observed, "Credit Diana Krall with doing what she does best on her sumptuous new album, This Dream of You, a collection of (mostly) classic covers rendered in her distinctive signature sensual style. All hushed smoky vocals, subtle orchestration and arrangements and, of course, her exquisite and articulate piano playing, it shares its nocturnal ambiance and late night caress in an intimate but expressive manner, one that would befit a supper club setting." Steve Futterman, in his review for The New Yorker, wrote, "Diana Krall's new album is a waiting game. For much of its length, the understated singer offers up congenial readings of Great American Songbook warhorses, relying on the fixed intimacy of her trademark breathy and oh-so-careful vocal style."

== Track listing ==
No.	Title	Writer(s)	Length
1.	"But Beautiful"	Jimmy Van Heusen; Johnny Burke	4:50
2.	"That's All / Azure-Te"	Bob Haymes; Alan Brandt; Wilfred Douchette; Donald Wolf	4:05
3.	"Autumn in New York"	Vernon Duke	5:19
4.	"Almost Like Being in Love"	Alan Lerner; Frederick Loewe	3:40
5.	"More Than You Know"	Edward Eliscu; Billy Rose; Vincent Youmans	3:57
6.	"Just You, Just Me"	Jesse Greer; Raymond Klages	2:25
7.	"There's No You"	Harold Hopper; Thomas Adair	4:48
8.	"Don't Smoke in Bed"	Willard Robison	3:17
9.	"This Dream of You"	Bob Dylan	7:01
10.	"I Wished on the Moon"	Dorothy Parker; Ralph Rainger	2:38
11.	"How Deep Is the Ocean"	Irving Berlin	5:18
12.	"Singing in the Rain"	Arthur Freed; Nacio Herb Brown	3:27
Total length:			50:45

== Personnel ==
Credits adapted from the liner notes of This Dream of You.

=== Musicians ===
- Diana Krall – piano (tracks 1–4, 6, 7, 9–12); vocals (all tracks)
- John Clayton Jr. – bass (tracks 1, 2, 4, 10, 12)
- Jeff Hamilton – drums (tracks 1, 2, 4, 12)
- Anthony Wilson – guitar (tracks 1, 2, 4, 12)
- Vanessa Freebairn-Smith – cello solo (track 1); cello (tracks 1, 3)
- Christian McBride – bass (tracks 3, 7)
- Russell Malone – guitar (tracks 3, 7)
- Alan Broadbent – piano (tracks 5, 8); orchestral arrangements (tracks 1, 3)
- Tony Garnier – bass (tracks 6, 9, 11)
- Karriem Riggins – drums (tracks 6, 9, 11)
- Marc Ribot – guitar (tracks 6, 9, 11)
- Stuart Duncan – fiddle (tracks 6, 9, 11)
- Randall Krall – accordion (track 9)
- Joel Derouin – concertmaster (tracks 1, 3)
- Charlie Bisharat, Mario DeLeon, Kevin Connolly, Neel Hammond, Tamara Hatwan, Natalie Leggett, Songa Lee, Katia Popov, Michele Richards, Kathleen Sloan, Marcy Dicterow Vaj, Ina Veli, John Wittenberg – violins (tracks 1, 3)
- Andrew Duckles, Kathryn Reddish, Colleen Sugata, Mike Whitson – violas (tracks 1, 3)
- Jodi Burnett, Alisha Bauer, Jeniffer Kuhn – celli (tracks 1, 3)

=== Technical ===
- Diana Krall – production
- Tommy LiPuma – production
- Al Schmitt – mixing (Note: Mixed at The Village (West Los Angeles)) (all tracks); recording (tracks 1–4, 6, 7, 9, 11, 12)
- Steve Genewick – engineering assistance, Pro Tools editing
- Chandler Harrod – engineering assistance
- Brian Montgomery – recording (tracks 5, 8)
- Chris Potter – recording (track 10)
- Eric Boulanger – mastering (Note: Mastered at The Bakery (Los Angeles))
- Shari Sutcliffe – production coordination
- Olivia Guerino – production coordination
- Chie Imaizumi – copyist
- Terry Woodson – copyist

=== Artwork ===
- Coco Shinomiya – design
- Mr. Fotheringham – label illustration

== Charts ==
=== Weekly charts ===
Weekly chart performance for This Dream of You
Chart (2020)	Peak position
Australian Jazz & Blues Albums (ARIA)	1
Belgian Albums (Ultratop Flanders)	58
Belgian Albums (Ultratop Wallonia)	42
Canadian Albums (Billboard)	82
Croatian International Albums (HDU)	4
Czech Albums (ČNS IFPI)	42
French Albums (SNEP)	36
German Albums (Offizielle Top 100)	30
Hungarian Albums (MAHASZ)	31
Japanese Albums (Oricon)	32
Polish Albums (ZPAV)	13
Portuguese Albums (AFP)	2
Scottish Albums (Official Charts)	42
Slovak Albums (ČNS IFPI)	62
Spanish Albums (Promusicae)	61
Swedish Jazz Albums (Sverigetopplistan)	3
Swiss Albums (Schweizer Hitparade)	13
UK Album Downloads (Official Charts)	65
UK Albums Sales (OCC)	38
UK Jazz & Blues Albums (Official Charts)	1
UK Physical Albums (OCC)	37
US Top Current Album Sales (Billboard)	23
US Top Jazz Albums (Billboard)	2
US Traditional Jazz Albums (Billboard)	2

=== Year-end charts ===
2020 year-end chart performance for This Dream of You
Chart (2021)	Position
Australian Jazz & Blues Albums (ARIA)	8
US Traditional Jazz Albums (Billboard)	25

2021 year-end chart performance for This Dream of You
Chart (2021)	Position
Australian Jazz & Blues Albums (ARIA)	29
