= The Frim-Fram Sauce =

Song performed by Nat King Cole

"The Frim-Fram Sauce" is a jazz song written by Redd Evans and Joe Ricardel. The lyrics of the song are from the point of view of a diner who isn't satisfied with corned beef, rye bread, or french-fried potatoes; the diner wants "the frim-fram sauce with the ossenfay", and also "chiffaufer, on the side".

In 2002, journalist William Safire said frim-fram sauce was a variant of flim-flam or deceit and "ussin-fay" was pig Latin for "fussing", meaning "playing about fretfully". Safire quoted singer Diana Krall on the meaning of "shafafa": "'It's all about sex,' she replied innocently."

The song was made famous by The King Cole Trio whose recording on October 11, 1945 (Capitol 224) reached the Billboard charts with a peak position of No. 19. "The Frim-Fram Sauce" was recorded by Ella Fitzgerald with Louis Armstrong in 1946 and many other artists have also made recordings including Diana Krall who recorded the song for her albums Stepping Out (1993) and All for You: A Dedication to the Nat King Cole Trio (1996).
