= Julius Rodriguez =

American pianist & drummer (born 1998)

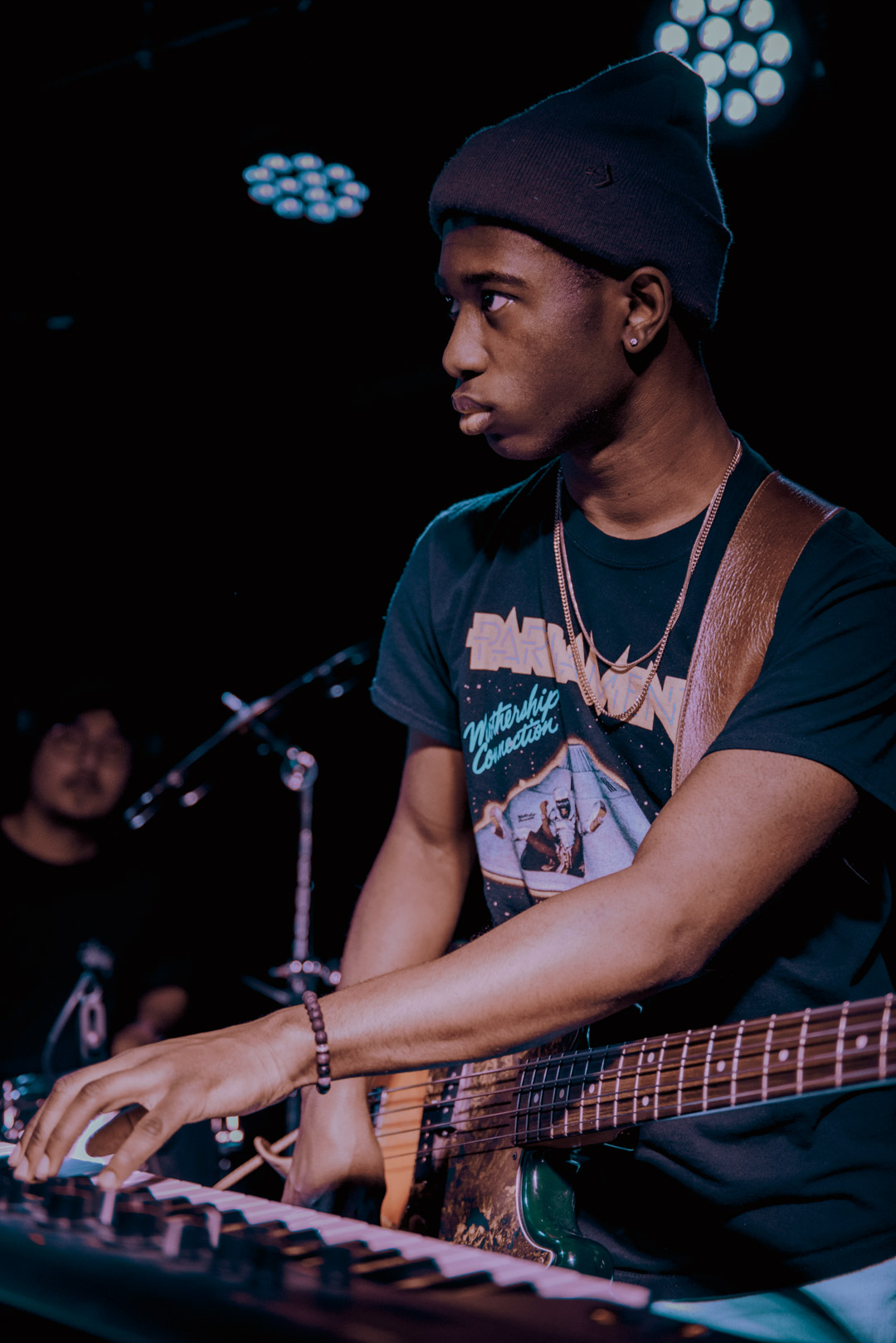

Background information
- Also known as: Orange Julius
- Born: September 4, 1998 (age 28)
- Origin: White Plains, New York
- Genres: Jazz, gospel, soul, hip hop, pop
- Occupation: Musician
- Instruments: Piano, keyboards, organ, drums, bass guitar, guitar
- Label: Verve Records
- Website: www.juliusrodriguez.com

Julius Rodriguez, also known as "Orange Julius", is an American pianist, drummer and composer. In 2021, Rodriguez signed with Verve Records.

== Biography ==
=== Early life ===
Rodriguez grew up in White Plains, New York and is of Haitian descent. He began to study classical piano at an early age. He was exposed to jazz, particularly music by Thelonious Monk, Duke Ellington, Louis Armstrong and John Coltrane through his father, an avid jazz aficionado. At age twelve, he enrolled in Manhattan School of Music's precollege division and studied there continuously throughout high school. He later studied at The Juilliard School.

=== Musical career ===
Rodriguez’s music integrates elements from jazz, avant-garde, R&B, hip-hop and pop music. He has drawn inspiration from The Bad Plus, Vijay Iyer and Jason Moran to find novel ways of integrating music outside of the jazz canon, including music by The Beatles.

Rodriguez has been an active touring member of Isaiah Barr's Onyx Collective, a group which has done collaborative work with a wide range of artists, including Dave Glasser, Ratking, and members of the Wu Tang Clan. The group accompanied A$AP Rocky on a 2018 tour in which Rodriguez performed on both keyboard and guitar.

He has worked as a sideman with Keyon Harrold, Ben Williams, Carmen Lundy, James Morrison, Jazzmeia Horn, Dev Hynes, Roy Hargrove, Macy Gray, Wynton Marsalis, Veronica Swift, Gabriel Garzón-Montano, Kurt Elling, Nick Hakim, Meshell Ndegeocello and others.

Rodriguez also performs regularly as a drummer.

== Discography ==
=== As leader ===
Album artist	Title	Year	Label
Julius Rodriguez	Evergreen	2024	Verve
Julius Rodriguez	Let Sound Tell All	2022	Verve
Julius Rodriguez	Midnight Sun	2021	Verve
Julius Rodriguez	Actual Proof	2021	Verve
Julius Rodriguez	Butterfly	2020	After School
Julius Rodriguez	Blues at the Barn	2020	Independent
Orange Julius and the Big Beat	Introducing Orange Julius and the Big Beat	2015	Independent

=== As sideman ===
Album artist	Title	Year	Label
Brasstracks	Before We Go: Live From Capitol Studios	2020	Capitol Records
Seint Monet	Bloom - EP	2020	Independent
MATHIS Sound Orchestra	World Unity	2020	Mathis Music
Jak Lizard	Work from Home - Single	2020	Independent
JD Walter	Dressed in a Song	2019	JWAL Records
Marcus Aaron	FreeTape2	2019	GodKids
Carmen Lundy	Modern Ancestors	2019	Afrasia Productions
Brasstracks (feat. Kyle Dion)	Professional	2019	Capitol Records
Fatherhood	Nervous	2019	Deathrocket Records
Brasstracks	Before We Go	2019	Capitol Records
S'natra	We Was Kids	2019	Independent
Kassa Overall	Go Get Ice Cream and Listen to Jazz	2019	Independent
Madeline Jane	Mother	2018	Independent
Damien Sneed	The Three Sides of Damien Sneed: Classical, Jazz and Sanctified Soul	2018	LeChateau Earl Records
Kassa Overall	Drake It Till You Make It	2018	Independent
Luke Sellick	Christmas	2017	Independent
Sara Decker Group	Long Distance	2017	Independent
Morgan Guerin	The Saga II	2017	Independent
Morgan Guerin	The Saga	2016	Independent
Mark Bozzuti-Jones	Jazz Out!: Them Irie Psalms	2014	Independent
