= Time Again (David Sanborn album) =

Timeagain

Studio album by David Sanborn
- Released: June 3, 2003
- Studio: Capitol (Hollywood); Hiatus (New York City); Right Track (New York City)
- Genre: Jazz, smooth jazz
- Length: 51:46
- Label: Verve
- Producer: Stewart Levine

David Sanborn chronology
Inside (1999)	Timeagain (2003)	Closer (2005)

Professional ratings
Review scores
Source	Rating
AllMusic	4/5 stars
The Penguin Guide to Jazz Recordings	3/4 stars

Timeagain is an album by jazz saxophonist David Sanborn that was released by Verve in 2003.

== Critical reception ==
Paula Edelstein of AllMusic writes, "The all-masterful Time Again has something for everyone. It's romantic, it's funky, it's laid-back, and it's definitely one that should be in your music collection. In a sense, David Sanborn has pulled off one of the best recordings of his career."

Geoffrey Himes of JazzTimes concludes his review with, "Once again Sanborn has demonstrated how it can be done right."

== Track listing ==
No.	Title	Writer(s)	Length
1.	"Comin' Home Baby"	Ben Tucker	7:11
2.	"Cristo Redentor"	Duke Pearson	5:47
3.	"Harlem Nocturne"	Earle Hagen	4:51
4.	"Man from Mars"	Joni Mitchell	5:02
5.	"Isn't She Lovely"	Stevie Wonder	3:17
6.	"Sugar"	Stanley Turrentine	5:35
7.	"Tequila"	Chuck Rio	5:36
8.	"Little Flower"	David Sanborn	3:37
9.	"Spider B."	David Sanborn; Ricky Peterson	6:29
10.	"Delia"	David Sanborn	4:21
Total length:			51:46

== Personnel ==
- David Sanborn – alto saxophone, acoustic piano (1, 3, 6–8)
- Gil Goldstein – rhythm arrangements (1, 2, 6, 10), acoustic piano (2, 6, 9, 10), string arrangements (4, 5, 8), horn arrangements (9)
- Ricky Peterson – keyboards (4, 5, 9), synthesizer bass programming (7), drum loops (7)
- Russell Malone – guitars (1–7, 9, 10)
- Christian McBride – bass
- Steve Gadd – drums
- Mike Mainieri – vibraphone (1–4, 6–10)
- Don Alias – percussion (1, 3, 4, 6, 7)
- Luis Quintero – additional percussion (3, 4, 7)
- Lawrence Feldman – alto flute (9), bass flute (9)
- Randy Brecker – trumpet (9), flugelhorn (9)
- Jesse Levy – cello (4, 5, 8)
- Caryl Paisner – cello (4, 5, 8)
- Alfred Brown – viola (4, 5, 8)
- Olivia Koppell – viola (4, 5, 8)
- Lani Groves – vocals (2)
- David Lasley – vocals (2)
- Arnold McCuller – vocals (2)
- Valerie Pinkston – vocals (2)

=== Production ===
- Stewart Levine – producer
- Joe Ferla – recording, mixing
- Al Schmitt – mixing
- Rik Pekkonen – vocal recording (2)
- Bernie Grundman – mastering at Bernie Grundman Mastering (Hollywood, California)
- Hollis King – art direction
- Isabelle Wong – design
- Henry Leutwyler – photography
- Patrick Rains & Associates – management

Track information and credits adapted from the album's liner notes.

== Charts ==
Chart (2003)	Peak position
US Traditional Jazz (Billboard)	1
US Top Jazz Albums (Billboard)	2
US Billboard 200	177
