= All for You: A Dedication to the Nat King Cole Trio =

Diana Krall studio album

Studio album by Diana Krall
- Released: March 12, 1996
- Recorded: October 3–8, 1995
- Studio: Power Station, New York City
- Genre: Jazz
- Length: 54:38
- Label: Impulse!; GRP
- Producer: Tommy LiPuma

Diana Krall chronology
Only Trust Your Heart (1995)	All for You: A Dedication to the Nat King Cole Trio (1996)	Love Scenes (1997)

Professional ratings
Review scores
Source	Rating
AllMusic	4.5/5 stars
Tom Hull	B
The Penguin Guide to Jazz on CD	3/4 stars
The Rolling Stone Jazz & Blues Album Guide	4/5 stars

All for You: A Dedication to the Nat King Cole Trio is the third studio album by Canadian singer Diana Krall, released on March 12, 1996, by Impulse! Records and GRP Records. The album pays tribute to the Nat King Cole Trio.

== Track listing ==
No.	Title	Writer(s)	Length
1.	"I'm an Errand Girl for Rhythm"	Nat King Cole	2:55
2.	"Gee Baby, Ain't I Good to You"	Don Redman; Andy Razaf	4:07
3.	"You Call It Madness"	Gladys Dubois; Con Conrad; Russ Columbo; Paul Gregory	4:37
4.	"Frim Fram Sauce"	Joe Ricardel; Redd Evans	5:01
5.	"Boulevard of Broken Dreams"	Al Dubin; Harry Warren	6:27
6.	"Baby Baby All the Time"	Bobby Troup	3:36
7.	"Hit That Jive Jack"	John Alston; Campbell "Skeets" Tolbert	4:16
8.	"You're Looking at Me"	Troup	5:33
9.	"I'm Thru with Love"	Matty Malneck; Gus Kahn; Fud Livingston	4:26
10.	"Deed I Do"	Fred Rose; Walter Hirsch	3:32
11.	"A Blossom Fell"	Howard Barnes; Harold Cornelius; Dominic John	5:13
12.	"If I Had You"	Ted Shapiro; Jimmy Campbell; Reg Connelly	4:55
Total length:			54:38

Non-US edition bonus track
No.	Title	Writer(s)	Length
13.	"When I Grow Too Old to Dream"	Sigmund Romberg; Oscar Hammerstein II	4:35
Total length:			59:13

== Personnel ==
Credits adapted from the liner notes of All for You: A Dedication to the Nat King Cole Trio.

- Diana Krall – piano, lead vocals
- Russell Malone – guitar
- Paul Keller – bass
- Benny Green – piano on "If I Had You"
- Steve Kroon - percussion on "Boulevard of Broken Dreams"
- Tommy LiPuma – production
- Al Schmitt – recording, mixing
- Doug Sax – mastering
- Tom Tavee – photography
- Robin Lynch – graphic design, art direction
- Laurie Goldman – graphic design
- Terry Teachout – liner notes

== Charts ==
=== Weekly charts ===
Chart (1996)	Peak position
US Traditional Jazz Albums (Billboard)	3

Chart (1998)	Peak position
US Heatseekers Albums (Billboard)	39
US Top Jazz Albums (Billboard)	1

Chart (2002)	Peak position
UK Jazz & Blues Albums (OCC)	3

Chart (2004)	Peak position
Polish Albums (ZPAV)	45

=== Year-end charts ===
Chart (1996)	Position
US Top Jazz Albums (Billboard)	11

Chart (1997)	Position
US Top Jazz Albums (Billboard)	7

Chart (1998)	Position
US Top Jazz Albums (Billboard)	16

== Certifications ==
Region	Certification	Certified units/sales
Canada (Music Canada)	Gold	50,000^{^}
United States (RIAA)	Gold	500,000^{^}
^{^} Shipments figures based on certification alone.
