= Christmas Songs (Diana Krall album) =

Studio album by Diana Krall featuring The Clayton/Hamilton Jazz Orchestra
- Released: October 26, 2005
- Recorded: 2005
- Studio: Capitol (Hollywood); Ocean Way (Hollywood) (Note: Additional recording); Sony Music (New York); Schnee (Hollywood)
- Genre: Jazz; Christmas
- Length: 44:52
- Label: Verve
- Producer: Tommy LiPuma; Diana Krall

Diana Krall chronology
The Girl in the Other Room (2004)	Christmas Songs (2005)	From This Moment On (2006)

Christmas Songs is the eighth studio album by Canadian singer Diana Krall, performed with The Clayton/Hamilton Jazz Orchestra. It was released on October 26, 2005, by Verve Records. This is Krall's first full-length album of Christmas songs (not counting her 1998 EP Have Yourself a Merry Little Christmas), and her first studio album with a big band. The album was released on vinyl for the first time on October 14, 2016.

== Critical reception ==
Professional ratings
Review scores
Source	Rating
AllMusic	4/5 stars
Tom Hull	B
Jazzwise	4/5 stars
The Penguin Guide to Jazz Recordings	2.5/4 stars

Tad Hendrickson of JazzTimes stated, "Krall gets a ton of help on her Christmas album from the well-drilled Clayton–Hamilton Jazz Orchestra as well as from the usual peeps in her own bands. The singer doesn't work too hard to sell it, preferring to stay in the pocket, and the solos are short all the way around, but it all sounds swingin', fun and jazzy". John Bungey of The Times noted, "If your idea of a perfect Yuletide is Jimmy Stewart on the telly and Bing on the radio, and you believe that, musically, it's all been downhill since 1955, then Krall's album will suit perfectly".

Dave Gelly and Nail Spenser of The Observer wrote, "If you feared the worst after hearing Diana Krall's last, rather droopy CD you can cheer up, because this one proves she hasn't forgotten how to swing after all. Corny idea or not, it is a terrific jazz-vocal album that will raise your spirits now and for several Christmases to come".

== Track listing ==
Christmas Songs
No.	Title	Writer(s)	Length
1.	"Jingle Bells"	James Pierpont	3:26
2.	"Let It Snow"	Jule Styne; Sammy Cahn	4:02
3.	"The Christmas Song"	Mel Tormé; Robert Wells	4:24
4.	"Winter Wonderland"	Felix Bernard; Richard B. Smith	3:15
5.	"I'll Be Home for Christmas"	Kim Gannon; Walter Kent; Buck Ram	3:08
6.	"Christmas Time Is Here"	Vince Guaraldi; Lee Mendelson	3:35
7.	"Santa Claus Is Coming to Town"	J. Fred Coots; Haven Gillespie	2:54
8.	"Have Yourself a Merry Little Christmas"	Ralph Blane; Hugh Martin	4:19
9.	"White Christmas"	Irving Berlin	4:32
10.	"What Are You Doing New Year's Eve"	Frank Loesser	4:10
11.	"Sleigh Ride"	Leroy Anderson; Mitchell Parish	3:26
12.	"Count Your Blessings Instead of Sheep"	Berlin	3:41
Total length:			44:52

== Personnel ==
Credits adapted from the liner notes of Christmas Songs.

=== Musicians ===
- Diana Krall – vocals (all tracks); piano solo (tracks 1, 2, 7, 12); piano (tracks 3–6, 8–11); arrangement (tracks 3, 9)
- Jeff Clayton – alto saxophone solo (track 2); flute solo (track 5)
- Ira Nepus – trombone solo (track 2)
- Anthony Wilson – guitar (tracks 3, 9, 12); guitar solo (track 4)
- John Clayton – bass (tracks 3, 9); arrangement (tracks 1–5, 7, 10, 11)
- Jeff Hamilton – drums (tracks 3, 6, 9, 12)
- Rickey Woodard – tenor saxophone solo (track 4)
- Ben Wolfe – bass (tracks 6, 8)
- Russell Malone – guitar (tracks 6, 8)
- Assa Drori – concertmaster (tracks 6, 8, 12)
- Jules Chaikin – orchestra contractor (tracks 6, 8, 12)
- Gerald Clayton – piano (track 7)
- Stefon Harris – vibes (track 9)
- Tamir Hendelman – Fender Rhodes (track 10); piano (track 11)
- Gilbert Castellanos – trumpet solo (track 11)
- George Bohanon – trombone solo (track 11)
- Alan Broadbent – piano (track 12)
- Randy Waldman – keyboards (track 12)
- Robert Hurst – bass (track 12)
- Emil Richards – percussion (track 12)
- Johnny Mandel – arrangement, conducting (tracks 6, 8, 12)
- Chris Walden – orchestrations

=== The Clayton/Hamilton Jazz Orchestra ===
- Jeff Hamilton – drums
- Robert Hurst – bass
- Anthony Wilson – guitar
- Gerald Clayton – piano (track 7)
- Tamir Hendelman – piano (track 11); Fender Rhodes (track 10)
- Jeff Clayton – lead alto saxophone, flute
- Keith Fiddmont – alto saxophone, clarinet
- Rickey Woodard – tenor saxophone solos, tenor saxophone, clarinet
- Charles Owens – tenor saxophone, clarinet
- Adam Schroeder – baritone saxophone, bass clarinet
- Rick Baptist, Sal Cracchiolo, Clay Jenkins, Gilberto Gilbert Castellanos, William Barnhart – trumpets
- Ira Nepus, George Bohanon, Ryan Porter – trombones
- Tommy Johnson – tuba
- Rick Todd, David Duke, Joe Meyer, Brad Warnaar – French horns
- Joe Porcaro – percussion

=== Technical ===
- Tommy LiPuma – production (all tracks); co-production (tracks 6, 8)
- Diana Krall – production (all tracks)
- Johnny Mandel – co-production (tracks 6, 8)
- Al Schmitt – recording, mixing
- Steve Genewick – engineering assistance, Pro Tools
- Koji Egawa – engineering assistance
- Bill Smith – engineering assistance
- Brian Vibberts – engineering assistance
- Dave Swope – engineering assistance
- Doug Sax – mastering at The Mastering Lab, Ojai, California

=== Artwork ===
- Hollis King – art direction
- Coco Shinomiya – design
- Sam Taylor-Wood – photography

== Charts ==
=== Weekly charts ===
Weekly chart performance for Christmas Songs
Chart (2005–2006)	Peak position
Australian Jazz & Blues Albums (ARIA)	4
Austrian Albums (Ö3 Austria)	27
Belgian Albums (Ultratop Flanders)	75
Belgian Albums (Ultratop Wallonia)	90
Canadian Albums (Billboard)	2
Dutch Albums (Album Top 100)	26
French Albums (SNEP)	52
German Albums (Offizielle Top 100)	34
Hungarian Albums (MAHASZ)	13
Italian Albums (FIMI)	35
Japanese Albums (Oricon)	78
Norwegian Albums (VG-lista)	16
Polish Albums (ZPAV)	9
Portuguese Albums (AFP)	4
Spanish Albums (PROMUSICAE)	44
Swedish Albums (Sverigetopplistan)	15
Swiss Albums (Schweizer Hitparade)	28
UK Albums (OCC)	155
UK Jazz & Blues Albums (OCC)	5
US Billboard 200	17
US Top Holiday Albums (Billboard)	1
US Top Jazz Albums (Billboard)	1
US Traditional Jazz Albums (Billboard)	1

Chart (2025)	Peak position
Portuguese Streaming Albums (AFP)	153

=== Monthly charts ===
Monthly chart performance for Christmas Songs
Chart (2026)	Peak position
German Jazz Albums (Offizielle Top 100)	14

=== Year-end charts ===
2005 year-end chart performance for Christmas Songs
Chart (2005)	Position
Swedish Albums (Sverigetopplistan)	83
US Top Jazz Albums (Billboard)	7

2006 year-end chart performance for Christmas Songs
Chart (2006)	Position
Australian Jazz & Blues Albums (ARIA)	36
US Billboard 200	139
US Top Jazz Albums (Billboard)	2

=== Decade-end charts ===
Decade-end chart performance for Christmas Songs
Chart (2000–2009)	Position
US Top Jazz Albums (Billboard)	14

== Certifications ==
Region	Certification	Certified units/sales
Austria (IFPI Austria)	Gold	15,000^{*}
Canada (Music Canada)	2× Platinum	200,000^{^}
Hungary (MAHASZ)	Gold	5,000^{^}
Poland (ZPAV)	Platinum	40,000^{*}
Portugal (AFP)	Gold	10,000^{^}
United States (RIAA)	Gold	500,000^{^}
^{*} Sales figures based on certification alone.^{^} Shipments figures based on certification alone.

== See also ==
- List of Billboard Top Holiday Albums number ones of the 2000s
