= Only Trust Your Heart =

Only Trust Your Heart may refer to:

- "Only Trust Your Heart", 1957 song composed by Nicholas Brodszky with lyrics by Sammy Cahn and sung by Dean Martin and Anna Maria Alberghetti in the 1957 movie Ten Thousand Bedrooms.
- "Only Trust Your Heart", 1964 bossa nova composed by Benny Carter with lyrics by Sammy Cahn. Notable recordings can be found on:
  - Getz Au Go Go, 1964 live album by Stan Getz.
  - Only Trust Your Heart (Diana Krall album), 1995 studio album by Diana Krall.
  - Only Trust Your Heart (Dionne Warwick album), 2011 studio album by Dionne Warwick.
