= The Girl in the Other Room =

Studio album by Diana Krall
- Released: March 31, 2004
- Recorded: 2003–2004
- Studios: Capitol, Hollywood; Avatar, New York City
- Genre: Jazz
- Length: 55:33
- Label: Verve
- Producers: Tommy LiPuma; Diana Krall

Diana Krall chronology
Live in Paris (2002)	The Girl in the Other Room (2004)	Christmas Songs (2005)

The Girl in the Other Room is the seventh studio album by Canadian singer Diana Krall, released on March 31, 2004, by Verve Records. In addition to cover versions, it is Krall's first (and as of 2025 only) album to include original material, which she co-wrote with her husband Elvis Costello.

== Background ==
Krall wrote some of the songs for the album with her husband, English musician Elvis Costello. Krall told USA Today that she had wanted to try songwriting before but lacked the confidence. "I started writing when I was a student but didn't really have the confidence to [pursue] lyric-writing in great depth. I've never done anything so personal."

On the Verve Records website, Krall explains the songwriting for the album in more detail: "I wrote the music and then Elvis and I talked about what we wanted to say. I told him stories and wrote pages and pages of reminiscences, descriptions and images, and he put them into tighter lyrical form. For 'Departure Bay', I wrote down a list of things that I love about home, things I realized were different, even exotic, now that I've been away."

"Departure Bay" is written about her hometown of Nanaimo, British Columbia, on Vancouver Island and the first Christmas without her mother and finishes the album. The penultimate song on the album, "I'm Coming Through", is also about the death of her mother.

As well as the songs she co-wrote with Costello, Krall departs from the standards she has sung on previous albums by performing songs by contemporary performers such as Costello, Tom Waits, and Joni Mitchell, as well as a Chris Smither song previously performed by Bonnie Raitt. She also covered Mose Allison's "Stop This World".

== Critical reception ==
Professional ratings
Aggregate scores
Source	Rating
Metacritic	67/100
Review scores
Source	Rating
AllMusic	3.5/5 stars
The Guardian	3/5 stars
Tom Hull	B
laut.de	5/5 stars
Mojo	3/5 stars
Now	3/5 Ns
Q	3.5/5 stars
Uncut	2/5 stars
The Penguin Guide to Jazz Recordings	3/4 stars

A reviewer of NPR commented, "The release is a departure from her past work, in that it bypasses interpretations of jazz standards in favor of new songs written by Krall and her husband, Elvis Costello". Jum Santella of All About Jazz wrote, "Some of the songs come from a different direction than her previous material. Nothing can change her core jazz focus, however. The spirit of Nat King Cole, Jimmy Rowles and Ray Brown continues to guide her at every turn". Linda Serck of musicOMH added, "Yet this album doesn't just take you on Krall's journey, it's not that self-indulgent. The lyrics are universal, the jazz a whole tapestry of moods. The Girl In The Other Room is a melancholy and beautifully-crafted body of work, full of evocative images and sounds. It not only shows Krall to be a superb song-writer but also the real woman behind that elegant poster-girl".

Pamela Winters of Paste stated, "Diana Krall has been wowing mainstream audiences for the past decade with her smooth, spare sound. If you like your jazz tidy, shiny and highly competent, you probably already have her CDs cozied up to that well-worn copy of Come Away With Me. But if you're among the music snobs who, when she married Elvis Costello, wondered, 'What does he see in her?' The Girl in the Other Room will attempt to answer your question." A reviewer of Cosmopolis wrote, "The Girl in the Other Room is no album for jazz purists. However, it should allow her definitively break into the fan base of popular music to which she gives new impulses and a rarely-heard quality".

== Track listing ==
No.	Title	Writer(s)	Length
1.	"Stop This World"	Mose Allison	3:59
2.	"The Girl in the Other Room"	Diana Krall; Elvis Costello (lyrics and music)	4:05
3.	"Temptation"	Tom Waits	4:28
4.	"Almost Blue"	Costello	4:04
5.	"I've Changed My Address"	Costello (lyrics); Krall (lyrics and music)	4:47
6.	"Love Me Like a Man"	Chris Smither (adapted by Bonnie Raitt)	5:49
7.	"I'm Pulling Through"	Arthur Herzog (lyrics); Irene Kitchings (music)	4:03
8.	"Black Crow"	Joni Mitchell	4:48
9.	"Narrow Daylight"	Costello (lyrics); Krall (lyrics and music)	3:32
10.	"Abandoned Masquerade"	Costello (lyrics); Krall (music)	5:11
11.	"I'm Coming Through"	Costello (lyrics); Krall (lyrics and music)	5:07
12.	"Departure Bay"	Costello (lyrics); Krall (lyrics and music)	5:40
Total length:			55:33

== Personnel ==
Credits adapted from the liner notes of The Girl in the Other Room.

=== Musicians ===
- Diana Krall – vocals, piano
- Anthony Wilson – guitar
- Neil Larsen – Hammond B-3 (track 3)
- Christian McBride – bass (tracks 1, 3, 4, 7–12)
- John Clayton – bass (tracks 2, 5, 6)
- Peter Erskine – drums (tracks 1, 4, 7–12)
- Jeff Hamilton – drums (tracks 2, 5, 6)
- Terri Lyne Carrington – drums (track 3)

=== Technical ===
- Tommy LiPuma – production
- Diana Krall – production
- Al Schmitt – recording, mixing
- Brian Montgomery – recording assistance
- Steve Genewick – Pro Tools engineering
- Doug Sax – mastering
- Robert Hadley – mastering

=== Artwork ===
- Hollis King – art direction
- Isabelle Wong – design
- Mark Seliger – photography
- DJ Hunter – booklet back cover photo
- Donna Ranieri – photo production

== Charts ==
=== Weekly charts ===
Weekly chart performance for The Girl in the Other Room
Chart (2004)	Peak position
Australian Albums (ARIA)	21
Australian Jazz & Blues Albums (ARIA)	3
Austrian Albums (Ö3 Austria)	3
Belgian Albums (Ultratop Flanders)	8
Belgian Albums (Ultratop Wallonia)	5
Canadian Albums (Billboard)	1
Czech Albums (ČNS IFPI)	38
Danish Albums (Hitlisten)	11
Dutch Albums (Album Top 100)	17
European Albums (Billboard)	4
Finnish Albums (Suomen virallinen lista)	28
French Albums (SNEP)	2
German Albums (Offizielle Top 100)	7
Greek Albums (IFPI)	11
Hungarian Albums (MAHASZ)	28
Irish Albums (IRMA)	65
Italian Albums (FIMI)	8
Japanese Albums (Oricon)	38
New Zealand Albums (RMNZ)	5
Norwegian Albums (VG-lista)	2
Polish Albums (ZPAV)	1
Portuguese Albums (AFP)	1
Scottish Albums (Official Charts)	12
Spanish Albums (PROMUSICAE)	5
Swedish Albums (Sverigetopplistan)	4
Swedish Jazz Albums (Sverigetopplistan)	1
Swiss Albums (Schweizer Hitparade)	7
UK Albums (Official Charts)	4
UK Jazz & Blues Albums (Official Charts)	1
US Billboard 200	4
US Top Jazz Albums (Billboard)	1
US Traditional Jazz Albums (Billboard)	1

=== Year-end charts ===
2004 year-end chart performance for The Girl in the Other Room
Chart (2004)	Position
Australian Jazz & Blues Albums (ARIA)	6
Austrian Albums (Ö3 Austria)	61
Belgian Albums (Ultratop Flanders)	59
Belgian Albums (Ultratop Wallonia)	55
Dutch Albums (Album Top 100)	64
French Albums (SNEP)	25
German Albums (Offizielle Top 100)	55
Italian Albums (FIMI)	75
New Zealand Albums (RMNZ)	39
Swedish Albums (Sverigetopplistan)	72
Swiss Albums (Schweizer Hitparade)	73
UK Albums (OCC)	140
US Billboard 200	103
US Top Jazz Albums (Billboard)	2
Worldwide Albums (IFPI)	47

2005 year-end chart performance for The Girl in the Other Room
Chart (2005)	Position
Australian Jazz & Blues Albums (ARIA)	17
French Albums (SNEP)	163
US Top Jazz Albums (Billboard)	4

2006 year-end chart performance for The Girl in the Other Room
Chart (2006)	Position
Australian Jazz & Blues Albums (ARIA)	29
US Top Jazz Albums (Billboard)	21

2007 year-end chart performance for The Girl in the Other Room
Chart (2007)	Position
Australian Jazz & Blues Albums (ARIA)	24

=== Decade-end charts ===
Decade-end chart performance for The Girl in the Other Room
Chart (2000–2009)	Position
US Top Jazz Albums (Billboard)	7

== Certifications ==
Region	Certification	Certified units/sales
Argentina (CAPIF)	Gold	20,000^{^}
Australia (ARIA)	Gold	35,000^{^}
Austria (IFPI Austria)	Gold	15,000^{*}
Canada (Music Canada)	2× Platinum	200,000^{^}
Germany (BVMI)	Gold	100,000^{^}
Hungary (MAHASZ)	Gold	10,000^{^}
Netherlands (NVPI)	Gold	40,000^{^}
New Zealand (RMNZ)	Platinum	15,000^{^}
Poland (ZPAV)	Platinum	40,000^{*}
Portugal (AFP)	Gold	20,000^{^}
Spain (Promusicae)	Gold	50,000^{^}
Switzerland (IFPI Switzerland)	Gold	20,000^{^}
United Kingdom (BPI)	Gold	100,000^{^}
United States (RIAA)	Gold	500,000^{^}
Summaries
Europe (IFPI)	Platinum	1,000,000^{*}
^{*} Sales figures based on certification alone.^{^} Shipments figures based on certification alone.
