= Russell Malone =

American jazz guitarist (1963–2024)

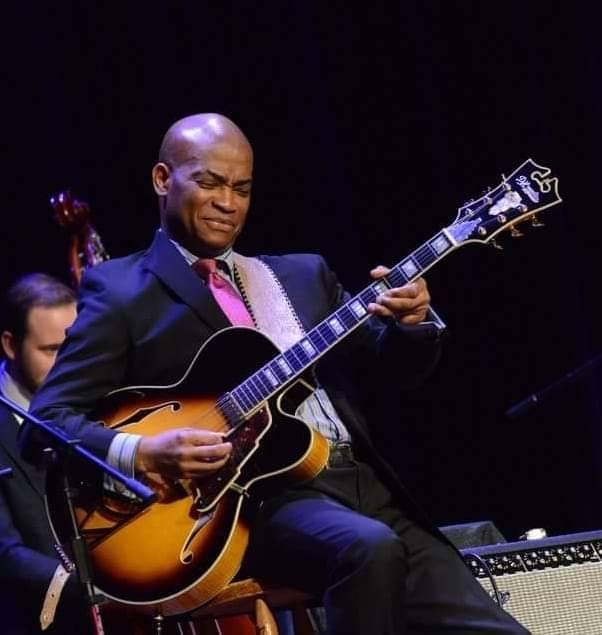
- Malone in 2019

Background information
- Born: Russell Lamar Malone; November 8, 1963; Albany, Georgia, U.S.
- Died: August 23, 2024 (aged 60) Tokyo, Japan
- Genres: Jazz
- Instrument: Guitar
- Years active: 1980s–2024
- Labels: Columbia; Maxjazz; HighNote; Impulse!; Venus; Verve; Telarc

Russell Lamar Malone (November 8, 1963 – August 23, 2024) was an American jazz guitarist. He began working with Jimmy Smith in 1988 and went on to work with Harry Connick Jr. and Diana Krall throughout the 1990s.

== Biography ==
Malone was born in Albany, Georgia, United States on November 8, 1963. He began playing at the age of four with a toy guitar that his mother bought him. He was influenced by B. B. King and The Dixie Hummingbirds. A significant experience for Malone was when he was 12 years old seeing George Benson perform on television with Benny Goodman. Malone was mostly self-taught.

Starting in 1988, he spent two years with Jimmy Smith, then three with Harry Connick Jr. In 1995, Malone became the guitarist for the Diana Krall Trio, participating in three Grammy-nominated albums, including When I Look in Your Eyes, which won the award for Best Vocal Jazz Performance. Malone was part of pianist Benny Green's recordings in the late 1990s and 2000: Kaleidoscope (1997), These Are Soulful Days (1999), and Naturally (2000). The two formed a duo and released the live album Jazz at The Bistro in 2003 and the studio album Bluebird in 2004. They toured until 2007.

Malone toured with Ron Carter, Roy Hargrove, and Dianne Reeves and did session work with Kenny Barron, Branford Marsalis, Wynton Marsalis, Jack McDuff, Mulgrew Miller, and Eddie "Cleanhead" Vinson. He recorded his first solo album in 1992 and led his own trio and quartet. He also appeared as a special guest with vibraphonist Bobby Hutcherson, organist Dr. Lonnie Smith, and pianist Hank Jones in celebration of his 90th birthday. In October 2008, Malone performed in a duo with guitarist Bill Frisell at Yoshi's in Oakland, California. During the next year, Malone became a member of the band for saxophonist Sonny Rollins, celebrating his 80th birthday in New York City.

Malone recorded live on September 9–11, 2005, at Jazz Standard, New York City, and Maxjazz documented the performances on the albums Live at Jazz Standard, Volume One (2006) and Live at Jazz Standard, Volume Two (2007). Appearing on these two volumes, and touring as The Russell Malone Quartet, were Martin Bejerano on piano, Tassili Bond on bass, and Johnathan Blake on drums. Malone's 2010 recording Triple Play (also on Maxjazz) featured David Wong on bass and Montez Coleman on drums. His album, All About Melody featured pianist Rick Germanson, bassist Luke Sellick, and drummer Willie Jones III.

Malone died from a heart attack in Tokyo on August 23, 2024, at the age of 60; he had been on tour in Japan as part of a trio with Carter and Donald Vega.

== Discography ==
=== As leader ===
Year released	Title	Label	Personnel/Notes
1992	Russell Malone	Columbia	With Harry Connick Jr. (piano) and Donald Brown (piano), Milt Hinton and Robert Hurst (bass), Shannon Powell and Yoron Israel (drums)
1993	Black Butterfly	Columbia	With Steve Nelson (vibraphone), Gary Motley (piano), Paul Keller (bass), Peter Siers (drums)
1998	Sweet Georgia Peach	Verve	With Kenny Barron (piano), Ron Carter (bass), Lewis Nash (drums)
2000	Look Who's Here	Verve	With Anthony Wonsey (piano), Richie Goods (bass), Byron Landham (drums)
2001	Heartstrings	Verve	With Alan Broadbent and Dori Cammi (arrangements), Kenny Barron (piano), Christian McBride (bass) Jeff "Tain" Watts (drums)
2004	Playground	MAXJAZZ	With Joe Locke (vibraphone), Martin Bejerano (piano), Tassili Bond (bass), E.J. Strickland (drums)
2006	Live At The Jazz Standard Vol. One	MAXJAZZ	With Martin Bejerano (piano), Tassili Bond (bass), Jonathan Blake (drums)
2007	Live At The Jazz Standard Vol. Two	MAXJAZZ	With Martin Bejerano (piano), Tassili Bond (bass), Jonathan Blake (drums)
2010	Triple Play	MAXJAZZ	With David Wong (bass), Montez Coleman (drums)
2015	Love Looks Good On You	HighNote	With Rick Germanson (piano) Gerald Cannon (bass), Willie Jones III (drums)
2016	All About Melody	HighNote	With Rick Germanson (piano) Luke Sellick (bass), Willie Jones III (drums)
2017	Time For The Dancers	HighNote	With Rick Germanson (piano) Luke Sellick (bass), Willie Jones III (drums)

As Co-Leader

- Ray Brown/Monty Alexander/Russell Malone (Telarc, 2002)
- Jazz at the Bistro with Benny Green (Telarc, 2003)
- Bluebird with Benny Green (Telarc, 2004)

=== As guest ===
With Ray Brown

- Some of My Best Friends Are...Singers (Telarc, 1998)
- Christmas Songs with the Ray Brown Trio (Telarc, 1999)
- Some of My Best Friends Are...Guitarists (Telarc, 2002)

With Harry Connick Jr.

- We Are in Love (Columbia, 1990)
- Blue Light Red Light (Columbia, 1991)
- When My Heart Finds Christmas (Columbia, 1993)

With Benny Green

- Kaleidoscope (Blue Note, 1997)
- These Are Soulful Days (Blue Note, 1999)
- Naturally (Telarc, 2000)

With Diana Krall

- All for You: A Dedication to the Nat King Cole Trio (Impulse!, 1996)
- Love Scenes (Impulse!, 1997)
- Have Yourself a Merry Little Christmas (Impulse!, 1998)
- When I Look in Your Eyes (Verve, 1999)
- The Look of Love (Verve, 2001)
- Christmas Songs (Verve, 2005)
- Turn Up the Quiet (Verve, 2017)
- This Dream of You (Verve, 2020)

With Houston Person

- Soft Lights (HighNote, 1999)
- Sentimental Journey (HighNote, 2002)
- The Art and Soul of Houston Person (HighNote, 2008)

With David Sanborn

- Time Again (Verve, 2003)
- Closer (Verve, 2005)
- Here and Gone (Decca, 2008)

With others

- Mose Allison, Gimcracks and Gewgaws (Blue Note, 1998)
- Kenny Barron, Spirit Song (Verve, 2000)
- Gary Bartz, The Blues Chronicles (Atlantic, 1996)
- Stefano Di Battista, Trouble Shootin' (Blue Note, 2007)
- David Benoit, Here's to You Charlie Brown (GRP, 2000)
- Don Braden, Organic (Epicure, 1995)
- Gary Burton, For Hamp, Red, Bags, and Cal (Concord Jazz, 2001)
- Regina Carter, Motor City Moments (Verve, 2000)
- Ron Carter, The Golden Striker (Blue Note, 2003)
- Cyrus Chestnut, Genuine Chestnut (Telarc, 2006)
- The Chieftains, Tears of Stone (RCA Victor, 1999)
- Jimmy Cobb, Jazz in the Key of Blue (Chesky, 2009)
- Natalie Cole, Ask A Woman Who Knows (Verve, 2002)
- Leon Lee Dorsey, Cantaloupe Island (Jazz Avenue 1, 2022)
- Will Downing, Sensual Journey (Verve, 2002)
- Deelee Dubé, Trying Times (Concord Jazz, 2020)
- Jon Faddis, Teranga (Koch, 2006)
- Macy Gray, Stripped (Chesky, 2016)
- Dave Grusin, Two for the Road (GRP, 1997)
- Roy Hargrove, Habana (Verve, 1997)
- Vincent Herring, Hard Times (Smoke Sessions, 2017)
- Shirley Horn, You're My Thrill (Verve, 2001)
- Freddie Hubbard, On the Real Side (Four Quarters, 2008)
- Etta Jones, All the Way (HighNote, 1999)
- B. B. King, Let the Good Times Roll (MCA, 1999)
- Gladys Knight, Before Me (Verve, 2006)
- Jeff Lorber, He Had a Hat (Blue Note, 2007)
- Branford Marsalis, I Heard You Twice the First Time (Columbia, 1992)
- Christian McBride, A Family Affair (Verve, 1998)
- Bill Mobley, Hittin' Home (Space Time, 2016)
- New York Voices, New York Voices Sing the Songs of Paul Simon (RCA Victor, 1998)
- Johnny O'Neal, On the Montreal Scene (Justin Time, 1996)
- Kenny Rankin, A Song for You (Verve, 2002)
- Tony Reedus, People Get Ready (Sweet Basil, 1998)
- Dianne Reeves, The Calling (Blue Note, 2001)
- Dianne Reeves, When You Know (Blue Note, 2008)
- Sonny Rollins, Road Shows, Vol. 2 (EmArcy, 2011)
- Stephen Scott, The Beautiful Thing (Verve, 1997)
- Janis Siegel, The Tender Trap (Monarch, 1999)
- Janis Siegel, Friday Night Special (Telarc, 2003)
- Terell Stafford, Centripetal Force (Candid, 1997)
- Joss Stone, Colour Me Free! (Virgin, 2009)
- Jimmy Smith, Dot Com Blues (Blue Thumb, 2000)
- Billy Taylor, Taylor Made at the Kennedy Center (Kennedy Center Jazz, 2005)
- Steve Turre, Delicious and Delightful (HighNote, 2010)
- Steve Turre, Kenny Barron, The Very Thought of You (Smoke Sessions, 2018)
- Gerald Wilson Orchestra, In My Time (Mack Avenue, 2005)

== Equipment ==
=== Guitars ===
- D'Angelico EXL-1
- Ibanez FA300
- Gibson L-5

==== Amplifiers ====
- AER Compact 60

=== Picks ===
- D’Andrea 2.0 mm
