= Martin Bejerano =

American jazz pianist, composer, and educator

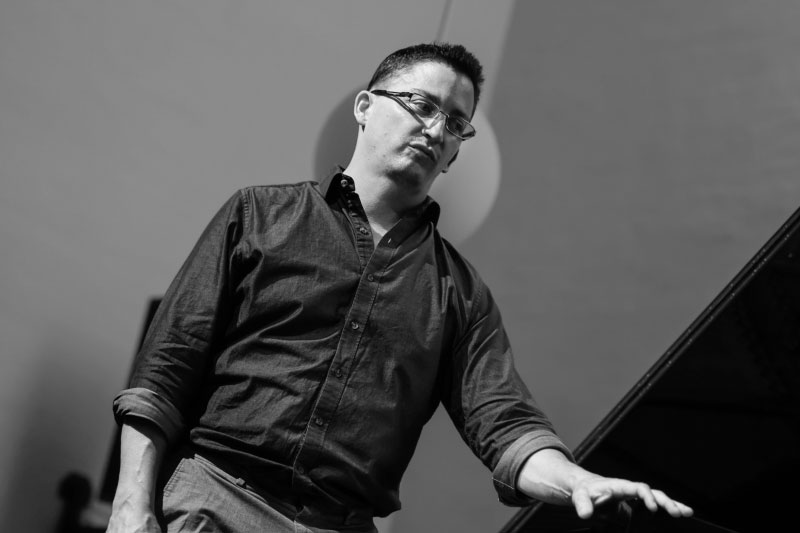
- Denmark 2018

Background information
- Born: Miami, Florida, U.S.
- Genres: Jazz
- Occupations: Musician, composer, arranger, educator
- Instrument: Piano
- Website: martinbejerano.com

Martin Bejerano is an American jazz pianist, composer, arranger, and educator.

== Life and career ==
Bejerano was born in Miami, Florida, and is of Afro-Cuban heritage. He graduated from the New World School of the Arts at Florida State University and obtained a master's degree in jazz piano performance from the University of Miami. He joined drummer Roy Haynes' band around 2000, and guitarist Russell Malone's quartet in 2002.

Bejerano's first album as leader, Evolution/Revolution, was released in 2007. The Penguin Guide to Jazz commented that there was a "classical sumptuousness in his work, though in jazz terms he is most obviously influenced by Chick Corea". In 2010, Bejerano was awarded a Chamber Music America commission for a new jazz work.

Bejerano has cited as influences a number of rock and pop bands and classical music composers and performers, as well as jazz musicians including pianists Corea, Herbie Hancock, and Keith Jarrett. Bejerano is an assistant professor of jazz piano at the Frost School of Music at the University of Miami.

== Discography ==
An asterisk (*) indicates that the year is that of release.

=== As leader/co-leader ===
| Year recorded | Title | Label | Personnel/Notes |
|---|---|---|---|
| 2006 | Evolution/Revolution | Reservoir | Trio, with Edward Perez (bass), Ludwig Afonso (drums) |
| 2013* | Potential Energy | | Some tracks trio, with Edward Perez (bass), Ludwig Afonso (drums); some tracks quartet, with Mark Small (sax) added |
| 2016* | Trio Miami | | Trio, with John Allen (bass), Michael Piolet (drums) |

=== As sideman ===
| Year recorded | Leader | Title | Label |
|---|---|---|---|
| 2004 | Daniel Smith | The Swingin' Bassoon | Zah Zah |
| 2005 | Russell Malone | Live at Jazz Standard Volume 2 | Maxjazz |
| 2002 | Roy Haynes | Fountain of Youth | Dreyfus Jazz |
| 2007* | Roy Haynes | A Life in Time | Dreyfus Jazz |
| 2011 | Roy Haynes | Roy-alty | Dreyfus Jazz |
| 2015* | Errol Rackipov | Pictures from a Train Window | First Orbit Sounds |
