= Love Scenes (Diana Krall album) =

Studio album by Diana Krall
- Released: August 26, 1997
- Studio: Avatar (New York City)
- Genre: Jazz
- Length: 55:07
- Label: Impulse!
- Producer: Tommy LiPuma

Diana Krall chronology
All for You: A Dedication to the Nat King Cole Trio (1996)	Love Scenes (1997)	When I Look in Your Eyes (1999)

Love Scenes is the fourth studio album by Canadian singer Diana Krall, released on August 26, 1997, by Impulse! Records.

Professional ratings
Review scores
Source	Rating
AllMusic	4/5 stars
The Buffalo News	3/4 stars
Tom Hull	A−
The Penguin Guide to Jazz on CD	3.5/4 stars
The Rolling Stone Jazz & Blues Album Guide	4/5 stars
DownBeat	4/5 stars

== Reception ==
Mary Kunz of The Buffalo News wrote, "This is a quiet recording, smooth and almost too uniform in texture. Krall's piano is silky and subdued, and she tends to yield most of the instrumental spotlight to her exquisite sidemen – guitarist Russell Malone and bassist Christian McBride. She keeps a lid on passion."

DownBeat reviewer Jim Macnie assigned the album 4 stars. He wrote, "By banking on nuance, Krall and company make a major statement". The issue also featured the release in "The Hot Box" feature, in which 3 additional critics assigned ratings. John McDonough and John Corbett each assigned 3 stars and critic John Ephland assigned 4 stars.

== Track listing ==
No.	Title	Writer(s)	Length
1.	"All or Nothing at All"	Jack Lawrence; Arthur Altman	4:35
2.	"Peel Me a Grape"	Dave Frishberg	5:52
3.	"I Don't Know Enough About You"	Peggy Lee; Dave Barbour	4:01
4.	"I Miss You So"	Jimmy Henderson; Bertha Scott; Sid Robin	4:42
5.	"They Can't Take That Away from Me"	Ira Gershwin; George Gershwin	5:39
6.	"Lost Mind"	Percy Mayfield	3:48
7.	"I Don't Stand a Ghost of a Chance with You"	Victor Young; Bing Crosby; Ned Washington	6:14
8.	"You're Getting to Be a Habit with Me"	Harry Warren; Al Dubin	2:14
9.	"Gentle Rain"	Luiz Bonfá; Matt Dubey	4:55
10.	"How Deep Is the Ocean (How High Is the Sky)"	Irving Berlin	4:45
11.	"My Love Is"	Billy Myles	3:26
12.	"Garden in the Rain"	Carroll Gibbons; James Dyrenforth	4:56
Total length:			55:07

International edition bonus track
No.	Title	Writer(s)	Length
13.	"That Old Feeling"	Lew Brown; Sammy Fain	2:32
Total length:			57:39

Japanese edition bonus track
No.	Title	Writer(s)	Length
14.	"Another Spring"	Lee; Hubie Wheeler	3:04
Total length:			60:43

== Personnel ==
Credits adapted from the liner notes of Love Scenes.

- Diana Krall – piano, lead vocals, liner notes
- Russell Malone – guitar
- Christian McBride – bass
- Tommy LiPuma – production
- Al Schmitt – recording, mixing
- Lawrence Manchester – recording engineering assistance
- Koji Egawa – mixing engineering assistance
- Doug Sax – mastering
- Marsha Black – project coordination
- Rocky Schenck – photography
- Hollis King – art direction
- Isabelle Wong – graphic design

== Charts ==
=== Weekly charts ===
Chart (1997–1998)	Peak position
Canada Top Albums/CDs (RPM)	47
French Albums (SNEP)	35
Japanese Albums (Oricon)	98
New Zealand Albums (RMNZ)	45
UK Albums (Official Charts)	152
UK Jazz & Blues Albums (Official Charts)	2
US Billboard 200	109
US Top Jazz Albums (Billboard)	2
US Traditional Jazz Albums (Billboard)	1

=== Year-end charts ===
Chart (1997)	Position
US Top Jazz Albums (Billboard)	7

Chart (1998)	Position
US Top Jazz Albums (Billboard)	2

Chart (1999)	Position
US Top Jazz Albums (Billboard)	4

Chart (2000)	Position
Canadian Albums (Nielsen SoundScan)	167

Chart (2001)	Position
Canadian Jazz Albums (Nielsen SoundScan)	5

Chart (2002)	Position
Canadian Jazz Albums (Nielsen SoundScan)	8

== Certifications ==
Region	Certification	Certified units/sales
Canada (Music Canada)	2× Platinum	200,000^{^}
Germany (BVMI)	2× Platinum	40,000^{‡}
United States (RIAA)	Platinum	1,000,000^{^}
^{^} Shipments figures based on certification alone.^{‡} Sales+streaming figures based on certification alone.
