= Luke Sellick =

- Born: August 31, 1990 (age 36); Winnipeg, Manitoba, Canada
- Genre: Jazz
- Occupation: Musician
- Instrument: Double bass
- Website: lukesellick.com

Luke Sellick (born August 31, 1990) is a Canadian jazz bassist, composer, and bandleader.

== Biography ==
A native of Winnipeg, Manitoba, Sellick completed his undergraduate degree at the University of Manitoba. He relocated to New York City in 2012 to attend the Juilliard School and study with jazz bassist Ron Carter. He works regularly as a sideman with pianist/singer Johnny O'Neal, saxophonist Jimmy Greene, pianist Orrin Evans, and guitarist Russell Malone.

Sellick released his debut album, "Alchemist," in early 2017 on the Cellar Live label featuring Jimmy Greene, Adam Birnbaum and others. The album has received rave reviews from critics and currently holds a five star rating on Amazon. Luke currently resides in New York City where he is working on his latest project, the Luke Sellick Expedition, along with being a mainstay on the jazz circuit and an avid hockey player.

== Discography ==
=== As leader ===
Title	Year	Label
Alchemist	2017	Cellar Live
Discovery	2024	Outside in Music

=== As sideman ===
Album artist	Title	Year	Label
Russell Malone	All About Melody	2016	High Note
