= Only Trust Your Heart (Diana Krall album) =

Studio album by Diana Krall
- Released: February 14, 1995
- Recorded: September 13–16, 1994
- Studio: Power Station, New York City
- Genre: Jazz
- Length: 46:49
- Label: GRP
- Producer: Tommy LiPuma

Diana Krall chronology
Stepping Out (1993)	Only Trust Your Heart (1995)	All for You: A Dedication to the Nat King Cole Trio (1996)

Only Trust Your Heart is the second studio album by Canadian singer and pianist Diana Krall, released on February 14, 1995, by GRP Records.

Professional ratings
Review scores
Source	Rating
AllMusic	3/5 stars
The Penguin Guide to Jazz on CD	3.5/4 stars
The Rolling Stone Jazz & Blues Album Guide	3.5/5 stars

== Track listing ==
No.	Title	Writer(s)	Length
1.	"Is You Is or Is You Ain't My Baby"	Billy Austin; Louis Jordan	4:57
2.	"Only Trust Your Heart"	Benny Carter; Sammy Cahn	5:19
3.	"I Love Being Here with You"	Peggy Lee; Bill Schluger	3:40
4.	"Broadway"	Bill Byrd; Teddy McRae; Henri Woode	7:27
5.	"The Folks Who Live on the Hill"	Jerome Kern; Oscar Hammerstein II	4:18
6.	"I've Got the World on a String"	Ted Koehler; Harold Arlen	5:20
7.	"Squeeze Me"	Duke Ellington; Lee Gaines	5:37
8.	"All Night Long"	Curtis Lewis	6:41
9.	"CRS Craft"	Ray Brown	3:30
Total length:			46:49

== Personnel ==
Credits adapted from the liner notes of Only Trust Your Heart.

=== Musicians ===
- Diana Krall – vocals (tracks 1–8); piano (all tracks)
- Ray Brown – bass (tracks 1, 3, 7, 9)
- Christian McBride – bass (tracks 2, 4–6, 8)
- Lewis Nash – drums
- Stanley Turrentine – tenor saxophone (tracks 1, 3, 9)

=== Technical ===
- Tommy LiPuma – production
- Carl Griffin – executive production
- Al Schmitt – recording, mixing
- Rich Lamb – engineering assistance
- Scott Austin – engineering assistance
- Doug Sax – mastering
- Gavin Lurssen – mastering
- Michael Landy – post-production
- Joseph Doughney – post-production
- Cara Bridgins – production coordination
- Joseph Moore – production coordination assistance

=== Artwork ===
- Carol Weinberg – photography
- Sonny Mediana – studio photos
- Hollis King – art direction
- Freddie Paloma – graphic design
- Michael Bourne – liner notes

== Charts ==
Chart (1995)	Peak position
US Top Jazz Albums (Billboard)	18
US Traditional Jazz Albums (Billboard)	8
