= The Look of Love (Diana Krall album) =

Studio album by Diana Krall
- Released: September 18, 2001
- Recorded: January 22–27, 2001 (Note: Tracks 2, 4 and 6–10); March 9–11, 2001 (Note: London Symphony Orchestra on tracks 2, 4 and 6–10); June 3–4, 2001 (Note: Tracks 1, 3 and 5)
- Studio: Avatar (New York City); Abbey Road (London); Capitol (Hollywood)
- Genre: Jazz; bossa nova; traditional pop; easy listening
- Length: 50:26
- Label: Verve
- Producer: Tommy LiPuma

Diana Krall chronology
When I Look in Your Eyes (1999)	The Look of Love (2001)	Live in Paris (2002)

The Look of Love is the sixth studio album by Canadian singer Diana Krall, released on September 18, 2001, by Verve Records. It became Krall's first album to top the Canadian Albums Chart. In 2002, the album earned Al Schmitt the Grammy Award for Best Engineered Album, Non-Classical, and received the Juno Award for Album of the Year in Canada.

Arranger Claus Ogerman uses a similar orchestration for "S'Wonderful" as the one he wrote for the 1976 João Gilberto album Amoroso.

== Critical reception ==
Professional ratings
Review scores
Source	Rating
AllMusic	3/5 stars
Robert Christgau	(choice cut)
Entertainment Weekly	A−
Tom Hull	B+
The Penguin Guide to Jazz Recordings	3/4 stars

Jim Santella of All About Jazz commented, "Lush strings and gliding flutes surround Diana Krall's tender vocals. Even her substantial piano interludes take on the appearance of drifting mists, through the mix of orchestral timbres. With an emphasis on her sultry vocal interpretations, the latest album reaches out to a broad, popular music audience. Nothing wrong with that. It's just that jazz fans usually want the improvised licks along with their melodies... By interpreting classic love songs, Krall's latest album turns toward romantic interests. The clutter of a large string orchestra, however, obscures the total picture".

John Kreicbergs of PopMatters wrote, "Simply said, her piano chops are more than adequate to back up her incredible voice. Yet this is exactly what makes The Look of Love so maddening. Krall's piano work is practically nonexistent on most of the tracks, save for a few perfunctory solos that often sink into in a sea of overly lush string and orchestral arrangements".

Doug Ramsey of JazzTimes stated, "The songs, including Burt Bacharach's title tune, are superb. The arrangements and performances enhance them. Krall's singing has improved with her every album. It is at a high level. If her record company can make her a major star with albums this good, and if it doesn't push her piano further into the background, serious listeners should have no complaint". A reviewer of Cosmopolis noted, "With her new album The Look of Love, Diana Krall confirms her exceptional status as a jazz singer. Her new CD is a touch too polished, too clean, but never kitsch, as one might have feared, since the album was recorded together with the London Symphony Orchestra. But the special, sometimes rough-edged character of her previous recordings is missing".

== Track listing ==
No.	Title	Writer(s)	Length
1.	"S'Wonderful"	George Gershwin; Ira Gershwin	4:28
2.	"Love Letters"	Victor Young; Edward Heyman	4:55
3.	"I Remember You"	Johnny Mercer; Victor Schertzinger	3:55
4.	"Cry Me a River"	Arthur Hamilton	5:03
5.	"Besame Mucho"	Consuelo Velázquez	6:40
6.	"The Night We Called It a Day"	Tom Adair; Matt Dennis	5:41
7.	"Dancing in the Dark"	Howard Dietz; Arthur Schwartz	5:48
8.	"I Get Along Without You Very Well"	Hoagy Carmichael; Jane Brown Thompson	3:44
9.	"The Look of Love"	Burt Bacharach; Hal David	4:42
10.	"Maybe You'll Be There"	Rube Bloom; Sammy Gallop	5:30

Target exclusive edition bonus tracks
No.	Title	Writer(s)	Length
11.	"The Man with the Bag"	Dudley Brooks; Hal Stanley; Irving Taylor	2:02
12.	"Charmed Life"	Diana Krall	2:48

Australasian tour edition bonus disc
No.	Title	Writer(s)	Length
1.	"Charmed Life"	Krall	2:48
2.	"But Not for Me"	G. Gershwin; I. Gershwin	5:09
3.	"I Love Being Here with You" (live recording)	Peggy Lee; Bill Schluger	5:32
4.	"Maybe You'll Be There" (live recording)	Bloom; Gallop	5:24
5.	"The Look of Love" (enhanced video)

Limited Asian tour edition bonus AVCD
No.	Title	Writer(s)	Length
1.	"I Love Being Here with You" (live) (music video)
2.	"The Look of Love" (music video)
3.	"Maybe You'll Be There" (live) (audio track)	Bloom; Gallop	5:24
4.	"Charmed Life" (audio track)	Krall	2:48
5.	"But Not for Me" (audio track)	G. Gershwin; I. Gershwin	5:09

== Personnel ==
Credits adapted from the liner notes of The Look of Love.

=== Musicians ===
- Diana Krall – piano, vocals (all tracks)
- Dori Caymmi – guitar (track 1)
- Christian McBride – bass (all tracks)
- Jeff Hamilton – drums (tracks 1, 3, 5)
- Paulinho da Costa – percussion (tracks 1, 3, 5)
- Los Angeles Session Orchestra – orchestra (tracks 1, 3, 5)
- Russell Malone – guitar (tracks 2, 4, 6, 8, 10)
- Peter Erskine – drums (tracks 2, 4, 6–10)
- London Symphony Orchestra – orchestra (tracks 2, 4, 6–10)
- John Pisano – guitar (tracks 3, 5)
- Romero Lubambo – guitar (tracks 7, 9)
- Luis Conte – percussion (tracks 7, 9)
- Claus Ogerman – orchestra arrangement, conducting

=== Technical ===
- Tommy LiPuma – production
- Al Schmitt – recording, mixing
- Aya Takemura – engineering assistance (tracks 2, 4, 6–10)
- Chris Clark – engineering assistance (tracks 2, 4, 6–10)
- Richard Lancaster – engineering assistance (tracks 2, 4, 6–10)
- John Hendrickson – engineering assistance (tracks 1, 3, 5); additional engineering
- Doug Sax – mastering
- Robert Hadley – mastering
- Bill Smith – engineering assistance
- Nat Peck – contractor for the London Symphony Orchestra
- Jules Chaikin – contractor for the Los Angeles Session Orchestra

=== Artwork ===
- Hollis King – art direction
- Isabelle Wong – design
- Donna Ranieri – photography production
- Bruce Weber – photography
- Jane Shirek – photos of Diana Krall in car

== Charts ==
=== Weekly charts ===
Chart (2001–2002)	Peak position
Australian Albums (ARIA)	7
Australian Jazz & Blues Albums (ARIA)	1
Austrian Albums (Ö3 Austria)	15
Belgian Albums (Ultratop Wallonia)	13
Canadian Albums (Billboard)	1
Danish Albums (Hitlisten)	27
Dutch Albums (Album Top 100)	49
European Albums (Music & Media)	14
French Albums (SNEP)	5
German Albums (Offizielle Top 100)	15
Irish Albums (IRMA)	50
Italian Albums (FIMI)	27
Japanese Albums (Oricon)	34
New Zealand Albums (RMNZ)	6
Norwegian Albums (VG-lista)	15
Polish Albums (ZPAV)	7
Portuguese Albums (AFP)	1
Scottish Albums (OCC)	49
Spanish Albums (AFYVE)	17
Swedish Albums (Sverigetopplistan)	36
Swedish Jazz Albums (Sverigetopplistan)	1
Swiss Albums (Schweizer Hitparade)	29
UK Albums (OCC)	23
UK Jazz & Blues Albums (OCC)	1
US Billboard 200	9
US Top Jazz Albums (Billboard)	1
US Traditional Jazz Albums (Billboard)	1

=== Year-end charts ===
Year-end chart performance for The Look of Love by Diana Krall
Chart (2001)	Position
Australian Albums (ARIA)	95
Australian Jazz & Blues Albums (ARIA)	1
Canadian Albums (Nielsen SoundScan)	8
Canadian Jazz Albums (Nielsen SoundScan)	1
European Albums (Music & Media)	97
French Albums (SNEP)	41
New Zealand Albums (RMNZ)	46
US Billboard 200	195
US Top Jazz Albums (Billboard)	1

Chart (2002)	Position
Australian Albums (ARIA)	37
Australian Jazz & Blues Albums (ARIA)	1
Belgian Albums (Ultratop Wallonia)	98
Canadian Albums (Nielsen SoundScan)	11
Canadian Jazz Albums (Nielsen SoundScan)	1
French Albums (SNEP)	81
US Billboard 200	91
US Top Jazz Albums (Billboard)	1

Chart (2003)	Position
Australian Jazz & Blues Albums (ARIA)	6
US Top Jazz Albums (Billboard)	3

Chart (2004)	Position
Australian Jazz & Blues Albums (ARIA)	20

Chart (2006)	Position
Australian Jazz & Blues Albums (ARIA)	15

Chart (2007)	Position
Australian Jazz & Blues Albums (ARIA)	13

=== Decade-end charts ===
Chart (2000–2009)	Position
US Top Jazz Albums (Billboard)	5

== Certifications ==
Region	Certification	Certified units/sales
Australia (ARIA)	Platinum	70,000^{^}
Austria (IFPI Austria)	Gold	20,000^{*}
Brazil (Pro-Música Brasil)	Gold	50,000^{*}
Canada (Music Canada)	7× Platinum	700,000^{^}
Denmark (IFPI Danmark)	Gold	25,000^{^}
France (SNEP)	Platinum	300,000^{*}
Germany (BVMI)	Gold	10,000^{^}
New Zealand (RMNZ)	Platinum	15,000^{^}
Switzerland (IFPI Switzerland)	Gold	20,000^{^}
United Kingdom (BPI)	Gold	100,000^{^}
United States (RIAA)	Platinum	1,600,000
Summaries
Europe (IFPI)	Platinum	1,000,000^{*}
^{*} Sales figures based on certification alone.^{^} Shipments figures based on certification alone.
