= Jonathan Blake =

American professional basketball player

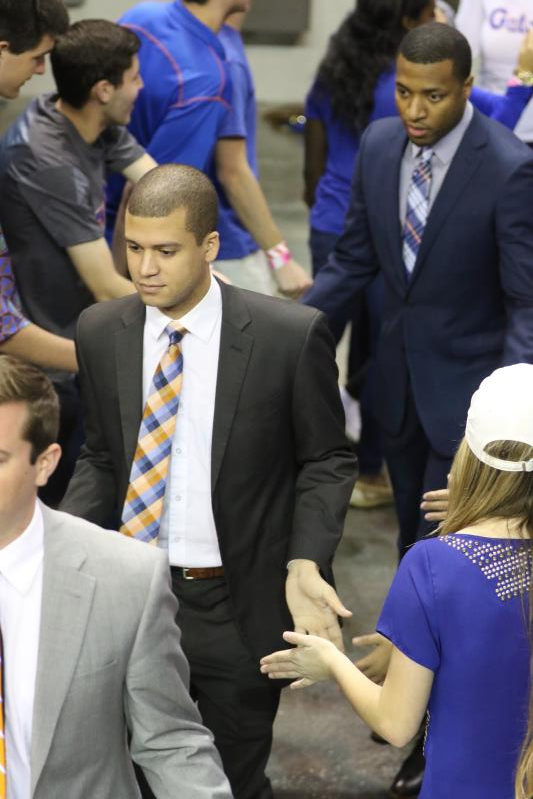

Personal information
- Born: October 6, 1987 (age 39) Houston, Texas
- Listed height: 6 ft 7 in (2.01 m)
- Listed weight: 190 lb (86 kg)

Career information
- High school: Cypress Springs (Cypress, Texas)
- College: Coffeyville (2007–2009); Texas Wesleyan (2009–2011)
- NBA draft: 2011: undrafted
- Playing career: 2011–present

Career history
- 2011–2012: Canton Charge

Jonathan Blake (born October 6, 1987) is an American professional basketball player. Blake played high school basketball at Cypress Springs High School, where he was named to the First-Team in District 17-5A and earned a McDonald's All-American Honorable Mention. Rated amongst the top-50 guards in the country, he led his team to third place in the district with records of 23–9 overall and 10–5 in district games. Blake went on to play two seasons at Coffeyville Community College, helping them to a conference championship and a top-5 national ranking in both seasons while graduating as the college's winningest class with 72 wins during that time. After lettering one season at Fort Hays State University. Blake played his last year of college basketball at Texas Wesleyan University, leading the team to a 30–4 season; matching the highest win total in the 74-year history of Texas Wesleyan basketball as they went on to win the program's fourth consecutive NAIA Red River Athletic Conference regular season championship. Blake earned an Honorable Mention All-American selection after averaging 13.8 points on .506 shooting and 7.8 rebounds per game in his first season with the Rams. He reached double-figures in scoring 24 times in 33 games played, posting eight double-doubles including a win over Texas College in which he scored a career-high 29 points while pulling down 13 rebounds.

Blake was selected by the Canton Charge, the NBA Development League affiliate team of the Cleveland Cavaliers with the second pick of the eighth round (113th overall pick) of the 2011 NBA D-League Draft.
