= Stepping Out (Diana Krall album) =

Studio album by Diana Krall
- Released: 1993
- Recorded: October 18–19, 1992
- Studios: Kingsound (North Hollywood, California); Group IV Recording (Hollywood, California)
- Genre: Jazz
- Length: 59:06
- Label: Justin Time
- Producer: Jim West

Diana Krall chronology
| Stepping Out (1993) | Only Trust Your Heart (1995) |

Stepping Out is the debut studio album by Canadian singer and pianist Diana Krall, released in 1993 by Justin Time Records. It has since been reissued several times on Justin Time, as Stepping Out: The Early Recordings on GRP Records, and as a vinyl record through Barnes & Noble.

Professional ratings
Review scores
| Source | Rating |
|---|---|
| AllMusic | 3/5 stars |
| The Penguin Guide to Jazz on CD | 3/4 stars |
| The Rolling Stone Jazz & Blues Album Guide | 3/5 stars |

== Track listing ==
| No. | Title | Writer(s) | Length |
|---|---|---|---|
| 1. | "This Can't Be Love" | Richard Rodgers; Lorenz Hart | 4:26 |
| 2. | "Straighten Up and Fly Right" | Nat King Cole; Irving Mills | 3:51 |
| 3. | "Between the Devil and the Deep Blue Sea" | Harold Arlen; Ted Koehler | 3:58 |
| 4. | "I'm Just a Lucky So and So" | Duke Ellington; Mack David | 4:20 |
| 5. | "Body and Soul" | Johnny Green; Edward Heyman; Robert Sour; Frank Eyton | 5:34 |
| 6. | "42nd Street" | Al Dubin; Harry Warren | 6:20 |
| 7. | "Do Nothin' till You Hear from Me" | Ellington; Bob Russell | 4:32 |
| 8. | "Big Foot" | Klaus Suonsaari | 6:59 |
| 9. | "Frim Fram Sauce" | Joe Ricardel; Redd Evans | 4:10 |
| 10. | "Jimmie" | Diana Krall | 5:26 |
| 11. | "As Long as I Live" | Arlen; Koehler | 4:39 |
| 12. | "On the Sunny Side of the Street" | Dorothy Fields; Jimmy McHugh | 4:51 |
| 13. | "Summertime" | George Gershwin; Du Bois Heyward/Ira Gershwin | 5:07 |
| Total length: | | | 64:15 |

- Note: early editions omit On the Sunny Side of the Street and Sumertime meaning those copies have a running time of 54:15.
  - Summertime was a bonus track on 2016 remastered edition

== Personnel ==
Credits adapted from the liner notes of the 2000 reissue of Stepping Out.

=== Studios ===
- Kingsound Studios (North Hollywood, California) – recording (tracks 1, 3–8, 10–12)
- Group IV Recording Studios (Hollywood, California) – recording (tracks 2, 9)
- Studio Tempo (Montreal) – mixing (all tracks)

=== Musicians ===
- Diana Krall – vocals, piano (all tracks); arrangements (tracks 2–12)
- John Clayton – bass
- Jeff Hamilton – drums
- Ahmad Jamal – arrangements (track 1)
- Klaus Suonsaari – arrangements (tracks 3, 8)
- Redd Evans – arrangements (track 3)

=== Technical ===
- Jim West – production
- Ian Terry – engineering (tracks 1, 3–8, 10–12); mixing, digital remastering (all tracks)
- Eddy King – engineering assistance (tracks 1, 3–8, 10–12)
- Hank Cicalo – engineering (tracks 2, 9)
- Rick Winquest – engineering assistance (tracks 2, 9)
- Denis Cadieux – mixing assistance
- Renée Marc-Aurèle – digital remastering

=== Artwork ===
- Les Paparazzi – photography
- Michael Slobodian – photography
- Graphic Junction – design
- Ray Brown – liner notes

== Charts ==
=== Weekly charts ===
Weekly chart performance for Stepping Out: The Early Recordings
| Chart (1998) | Peak position |
|---|---|
| US Top Jazz Albums (Billboard) | 8 |
| US Traditional Jazz Albums (Billboard) | 3 |

Weekly chart performance for Stepping Out
| Chart (2000) | Peak position |
|---|---|
| US Top Jazz Albums (Billboard) | 12 |
| US Traditional Jazz Albums (Billboard) | 3 |

=== Year-end charts ===
1998 year-end chart performance for Stepping Out: The Early Recordings
| Chart (1998) | Position |
|---|---|
| US Top Jazz Albums (Billboard) | 17 |

1999 year-end chart performance for Stepping Out: The Early Recordings
| Chart (1999) | Position |
|---|---|
| US Top Jazz Albums (Billboard) | 18 |

2000 year-end chart performance for Stepping Out
| Chart (2000) | Position |
|---|---|
| US Top Jazz Albums (Billboard) | 11 |

2001 year-end chart performance for Stepping Out
| Chart (2001) | Position |
|---|---|
| US Top Jazz Albums (Billboard) | 4 |

== Certifications ==
| Region | Certification | Certified units/sales |
|---|---|---|
| Canada (Music Canada) | Gold | 50,000^{^} |
^{^} Shipments figures based on certification alone.
