= When I Look in Your Eyes =

Studio album by Diana Krall
- Released: June 8, 1999
- Studio: Avatar (New York City)
- Genres: Jazz; easy listening
- Length: 54:18
- Label: Verve
- Producers: Tommy LiPuma; Johnny Mandel; David Foster

Diana Krall chronology
Love Scenes (1997)	When I Look in Your Eyes (1999)	The Look of Love (2001)

When I Look in Your Eyes is the fifth studio album by Canadian singer Diana Krall, released on June 8, 1999, by Verve Records. It was nominated for a Grammy Award for Album of the Year, the first time in 25 years that a jazz album was nominated in that category, and won two awards for Best Jazz Vocal and Best Engineered Album, Non-Classical at the 42nd Grammy Awards. The album also won the Juno Award for Best Vocal Jazz Album in 2000.

Professional ratings
Review scores
Source	Rating
AllMusic	4/5 stars
Penguin Guide to Jazz	3/4 stars

== Track listing ==
No.	Title	Writer(s)	Length
1.	"Let's Face the Music and Dance"	Irving Berlin	5:18
2.	"Devil May Care"	Bob Dorough	3:20
3.	"Let's Fall in Love"	Ted Koehler; Harold Arlen	4:19
4.	"When I Look in Your Eyes"	Leslie Bricusse	4:31
5.	"Popsicle Toes"	Michael Franks	4:28
6.	"I've Got You Under My Skin"	Cole Porter	6:10
7.	"I Can't Give You Anything but Love"	Jimmy McHugh; Dorothy Fields	2:32
8.	"I'll String Along with You"	Harry Warren; Al Dubin	4:45
9.	"East of the Sun (and West of the Moon)"	Brooks Bowman	4:57
10.	"Pick Yourself Up"	Jerome Kern; Fields	3:02
11.	"The Best Thing for You"	Berlin	2:37
12.	"Do It Again"	George Gershwin; B.G. DeSylva	4:35
13.	"Why Should I Care" (hidden track)	Clint Eastwood; Carole Bayer Sager; Linda Thompson-Jenner	3:44
Total length:			54:18

== Personnel ==
Credits adapted from the liner notes of When I Look in Your Eyes.

=== Musicians ===
- Diana Krall – piano (tracks 1–3, 5–13); vocals (all tracks); small ensemble arrangements (tracks 2, 4–9); co-arrangements (tracks 1, 3, 10–12)
- Russell Malone – guitar (tracks 1–12)
- John Clayton – acoustic bass (tracks 1, 3, 5, 10–12); co-arrangements (tracks 1, 3, 10–12)
- Jeff Hamilton – drums (tracks 1, 3, 5, 10–13)
- Ben Wolfe – acoustic bass (tracks 2, 6, 8, 9)
- Larry Bunker – vibes (tracks 3, 6)
- Lewis Nash – drums (tracks 6, 8)
- Pete Christlieb – saxophone (track 13)
- Chuck Berghofer – acoustic bass (track 13)
- Alan Broadbent – piano (track 13)
- Johnny Mandel – arrangements, conducting (tracks 1, 3, 4, 6, 8, 10, 12)
- Eddie Karam – conducting (tracks 1, 3, 4, 6, 8, 10, 12)
- Diana Krall Trio – small ensemble arrangements (tracks 2, 4–9)

=== Technical ===
- Tommy LiPuma – production (all tracks)
- Johnny Mandel – production (tracks 1, 3, 4, 6, 8, 10, 12)
- Al Schmitt – recording, mixing
- David Foster – production (track 13)
- Bill Smith – recording engineering assistance, mixing engineering assistance
- Rory Romano – recording engineering assistance
- Anthony Ruotolo – recording engineering assistance
- Koji Egawa – mixing engineering assistance
- Doug Sax – mastering

=== Artwork ===
- Hollis King – art direction
- Isabelle Wong – graphic design
- Jane Shirek – photography

== Charts ==
=== Weekly charts ===
Chart (1999–2001)	Peak position
Australian Albums (ARIA)	72
Canadian Albums (Billboard)	12
French Albums (SNEP)	17
Japanese Albums (Oricon)	62
New Zealand Albums (RMNZ)	28
UK Albums (Official Charts)	72
UK Jazz & Blues Albums (Official Charts)	1
US Billboard 200	56
US Top Jazz Albums (Billboard)	1
US Traditional Jazz Albums (Billboard)	1

Chart (2004)	Peak position
Polish Albums (ZPAV)	41

=== Year-end charts ===
Year-end chart performance for When I Look in Your Eyes
Chart (1999)	Position
Canadian Top Albums/CDs (RPM)	30

Chart (2000)	Position
Canadian Albums (Nielsen SoundScan)	72
US Top Jazz Albums (Billboard)	1

Chart (2001)	Position
Canadian Albums (Nielsen SoundScan)	176
Canadian Jazz Albums (Nielsen SoundScan)	3
US Top Jazz Albums (Billboard)	4

Chart (2002)	Position
Canadian Jazz Albums (Nielsen SoundScan)	7

=== Decade-end charts ===
Chart (2000–2009)	Position
US Top Jazz Albums (Billboard)	9

== Certifications ==
Region	Certification	Certified units/sales
Canada (Music Canada)	3× Platinum	300,000^{^}
France (SNEP)	Gold	100,000^{*}
Germany (BVMI)	4× Platinum	80,000^{‡}
New Zealand (RMNZ)	Platinum	15,000^{^}
United Kingdom (BPI)	Silver	60,000^{^}
United States (RIAA)	Platinum	1,000,000^{^}
^{*} Sales figures based on certification alone.^{^} Shipments figures based on certification alone.^{‡} Sales+streaming figures based on certification alone.
