= Diana Krall =

Canadian jazz singer and pianist (born 1964)

Diana Krall OC OBC
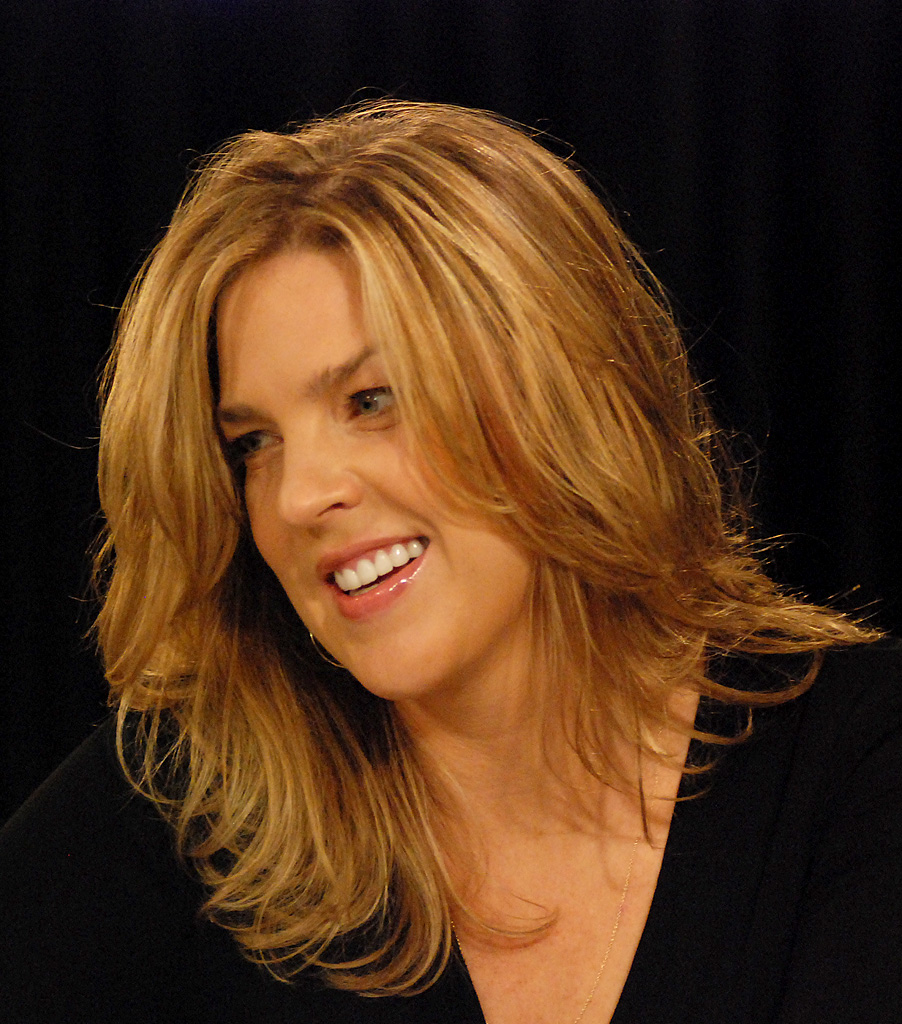
- Krall at a CD signing in Toronto in September 2007

Background information
- Born: Diana Jean Krall; November 16, 1964 (age 62); Nanaimo, British Columbia, Canada
- Genres: Jazz; traditional pop; bossa nova
- Occupations: Singer; musician; songwriter
- Instruments: Vocals; piano
- Years active: 1993–present
- Labels: Justin Time; GRP; Impulse; Verve
- Spouse: Elvis Costello (m. 2003)
- Website: dianakrall.com

Diana Jean Krall OC OBC (born November 16, 1964) is a Canadian jazz pianist and singer known for her contralto vocals. She has sold more than 15 million albums worldwide, including over six million in the U.S. On December 11, 2009, Billboard magazine named her the second-greatest jazz artist of the decade (2000–2009), establishing her as one of the best-selling artists of her time.

Krall is the only jazz singer to have had eight albums debut at the top of the Billboard Jazz Albums chart. She has won two Grammy Awards and eight Juno Awards. She has also earned nine gold, three platinum, and seven multi-platinum albums.

== Early years ==
Krall was born on November 16, 1964, in Nanaimo, British Columbia, the daughter of Adella A. (née Wende), an elementary school teacher, and Stephen James "Jim" Krall, an accountant. Krall's only sibling, Michelle, is a former member of the Royal Canadian Mounted Police (RCMP). Krall's father played piano at home, and her mother sang in a community choir. Krall began studying piano herself at the age of four and took exams through The Royal Conservatory of Music.

In high school, she was a member of a student jazz group; at 15, she began playing professionally in local restaurants. Krall won a scholarship to attend the Berklee College of Music in Boston, where she studied from 1981 to 1983, before spending time in Los Angeles to play jazz. She returned to Canada to record her first album in 1992.

She met veteran bassist Ray Brown in the early 1980s. Impressed by her piano playing, he introduced Krall to other musicians and was an important mentor.

== Career ==
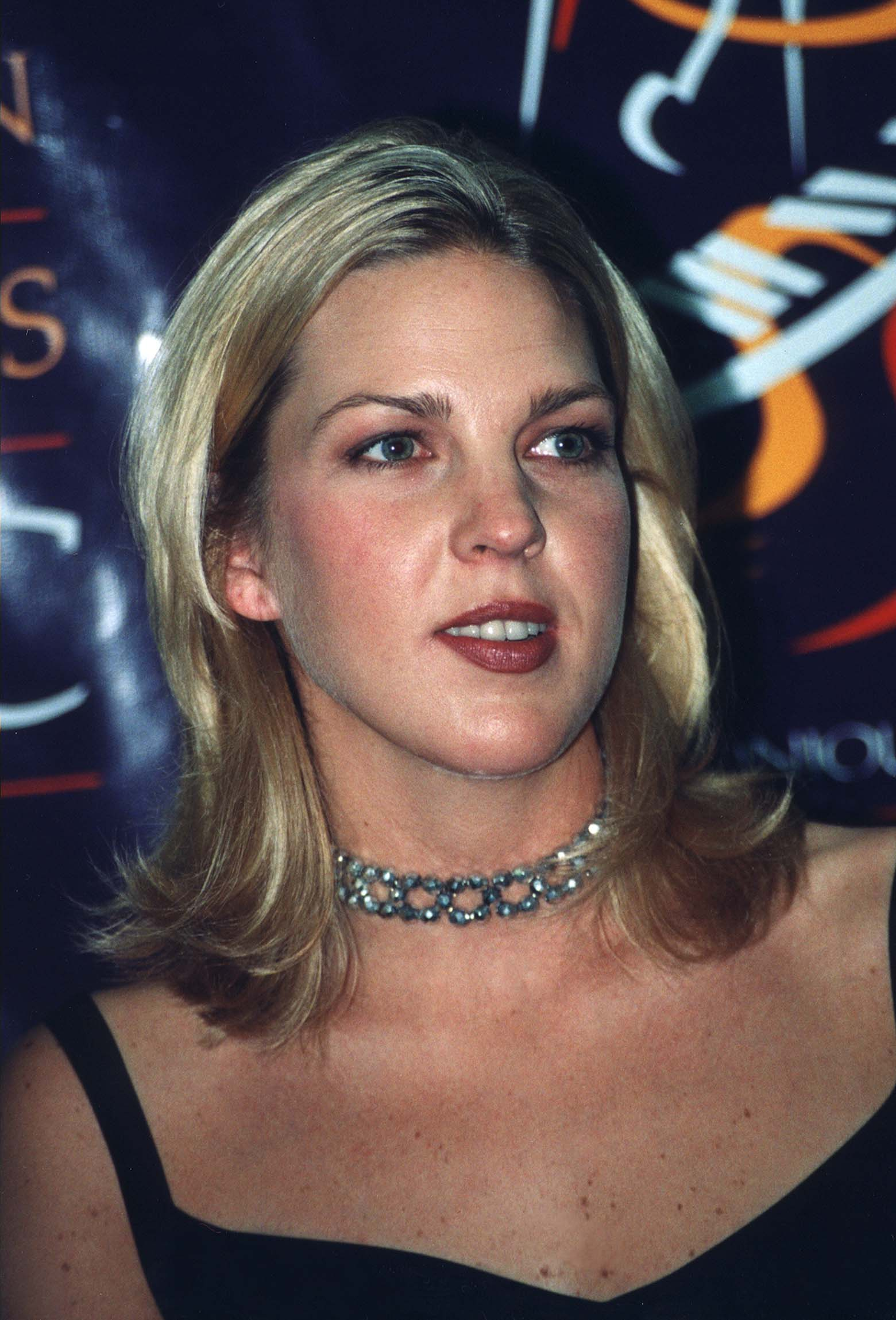
Krall in 1998

Krall recorded her first album, Stepping Out, for Justin Time Records in 1992; the album was released in 1993. She was accompanied by bassist John Clayton and drummer Jeff Hamilton. It caught the attention of producer Tommy LiPuma, who produced her second album, Only Trust Your Heart (1995).

Her third album, All for You: A Dedication to the Nat King Cole Trio (1996), was nominated for a Grammy and continued for 70 weeks in the Billboard jazz charts. Love Scenes (1997) quickly became a hit record with the trio of Krall, Russell Malone (guitar), and Christian McBride (bass).

In August 2000, Krall partnered with Tony Bennett for a 20-city tour, and in 2008–09 they worked together again for a song on the TV series Spectacle: Elvis Costello with...

Orchestral arrangements by Johnny Mandel provided the background for her fifth studio album When I Look in Your Eyes (1999), her first released through Verve Records. The band mix was kept, following arrangements on The Look of Love (2001) created by Claus Ogerman; this record achieved platinum status and reached the top 10 of the Billboard 200. The title track from the album, a cover of the Casino Royale standard popularized in the late 1960s by Dusty Springfield and Sérgio Mendes, reached number 22 on the adult contemporary chart.

In September 2001, Krall began a world tour. Her concert at the Paris Olympia was recorded and released in 2002 as her first live record, Live in Paris (issued with a different European title, A Night In Paris). The album included covers of Billy Joel's "Just the Way You Are" (a hit on U.S. smooth jazz radio) and Joni Mitchell's "A Case of You", and was also released as a video album.

The 2001 movie The Score (US and Germany), starring Robert De Niro and Marlon Brando, featured a recording of Krall's titled "I'll Make It Up As I Go." This song accompanied the film's ending credits and was composed by fellow Canadian David Foster.

After marrying English singer-songwriter Elvis Costello in 2003, Krall worked with him as a lyricist and began to compose her own songs, resulting in the album The Girl in the Other Room. Released in April 2004, it quickly rose to the top five in the United Kingdom and peaked at 21st in Australia's albums chart. She also joined Ray Charles on his Genius Loves Company album in 2004 for the song "You Don't Know Me", and her 2004 performance at Bell Centre, Montreal on June 29 was released as her second live CD and DVD, Live at the Montreal Jazz Festival, released on November 23, 2004.

In late May 2007, Krall was featured in a Lexus advertisement campaign. That year she also sang "Dream a Little Dream of Me" with piano accompaniment by pianist Hank Jones for an "all-star" tribute album We All Love Ella: Celebrating the First Lady of Song (2007) produced by Phil Ramone.

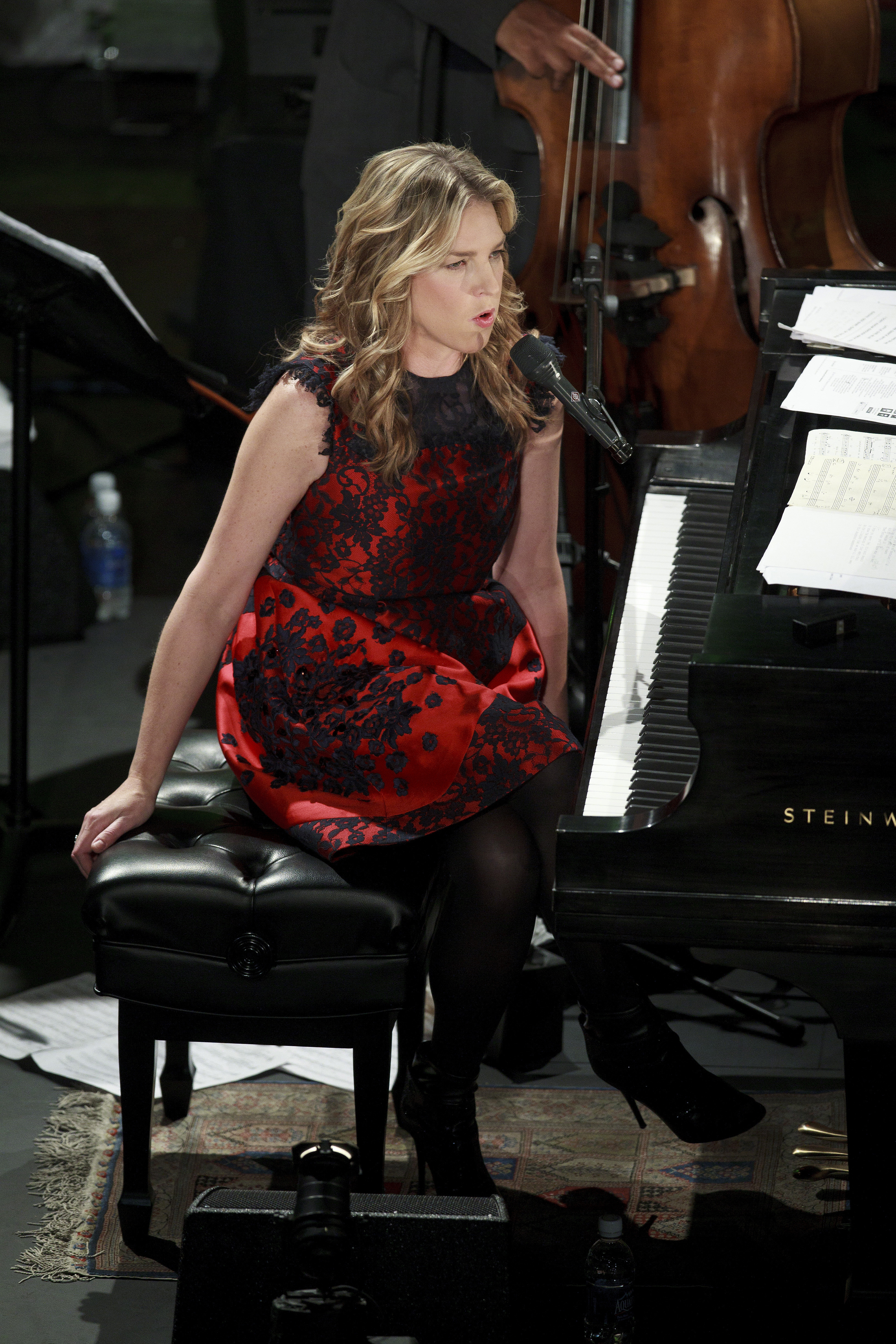
Krall performing in November 2010 at the Paramount Theater in Charlottesville, Virginia

Quiet Nights, produced by Krall and Tommy LiPuma, was released on March 31, 2009, and consisted of mainly bossa nova standards.

Krall produced Barbra Streisand's album Love Is the Answer, released on September 29, 2009.

In 2011, Krall went on a private retreat to Sri Lanka. In September 2012, she accompanied Paul McCartney at Capitol Studios in a live performance of his album Kisses on the Bottom, which was shown live on the internet. On September 13, 2012, Krall performed "Fly Me to the Moon" at astronaut Neil Armstrong's memorial service in Washington, D.C.

Her eleventh studio album, Glad Rag Doll, produced by T Bone Burnett, was released on October 2, 2012, and covered mainly jazz tunes from the 1920s and 1930s. Her next, Wallflower, released on February 3, 2015, by Verve Records and produced by David Foster, featured more recent composers including the Eagles (two songs), Elton John and Bernie Taupin ("Sorry Seems to Be the Hardest Word"), 10cc ("I'm Not in Love"), Neil Finn ("Don't Dream It's Over"), and Gilbert O'Sullivan ("Alone Again (Naturally)"). The album's title song is from Bob Dylan's "Bootleg Series", and Paul McCartney gave her his blessing to include "I'll Take You Home Tonight", a previously unreleased original song he had written for his own Kisses on the Bottom album.

On May 5, 2017, Krall released her thirteenth album, Turn Up the Quiet, produced by Krall and Tommy LiPuma again. The album won a Juno Award as vocal jazz album of the year in 2018.

On September 14, 2018, a joint album between Krall and Tony Bennett, Love Is Here to Stay, was released. The album features the song "Fascinating Rhythm", originally recorded by Bennett in 1949, which earned him a Guinness World Record for the "longest time between the release of an original recording and a re-recording of the same single by the same artist" — 68 years and 342 days.

September 2020 brought the release of her sixteenth studio album, This Dream of You, named after Krall's rendition of the Bob Dylan song from his 2009 album Together Through Life. The album's dozen tracks were selected from over 30 unused recordings previously laid down by Krall with her longtime producer Tommy LiPuma before his death in 2017. The album was completed in May 2020 with production finished by Krall herself, and included the jazz standard "Autumn in New York" for which a video was created to raise awareness for New York Cares, the largest volunteer organization in New York City founded in 1987.

Krall's companions on her 2024 tour were Sebastian Steinberg and Matt Chamberlain.

== Personal life ==
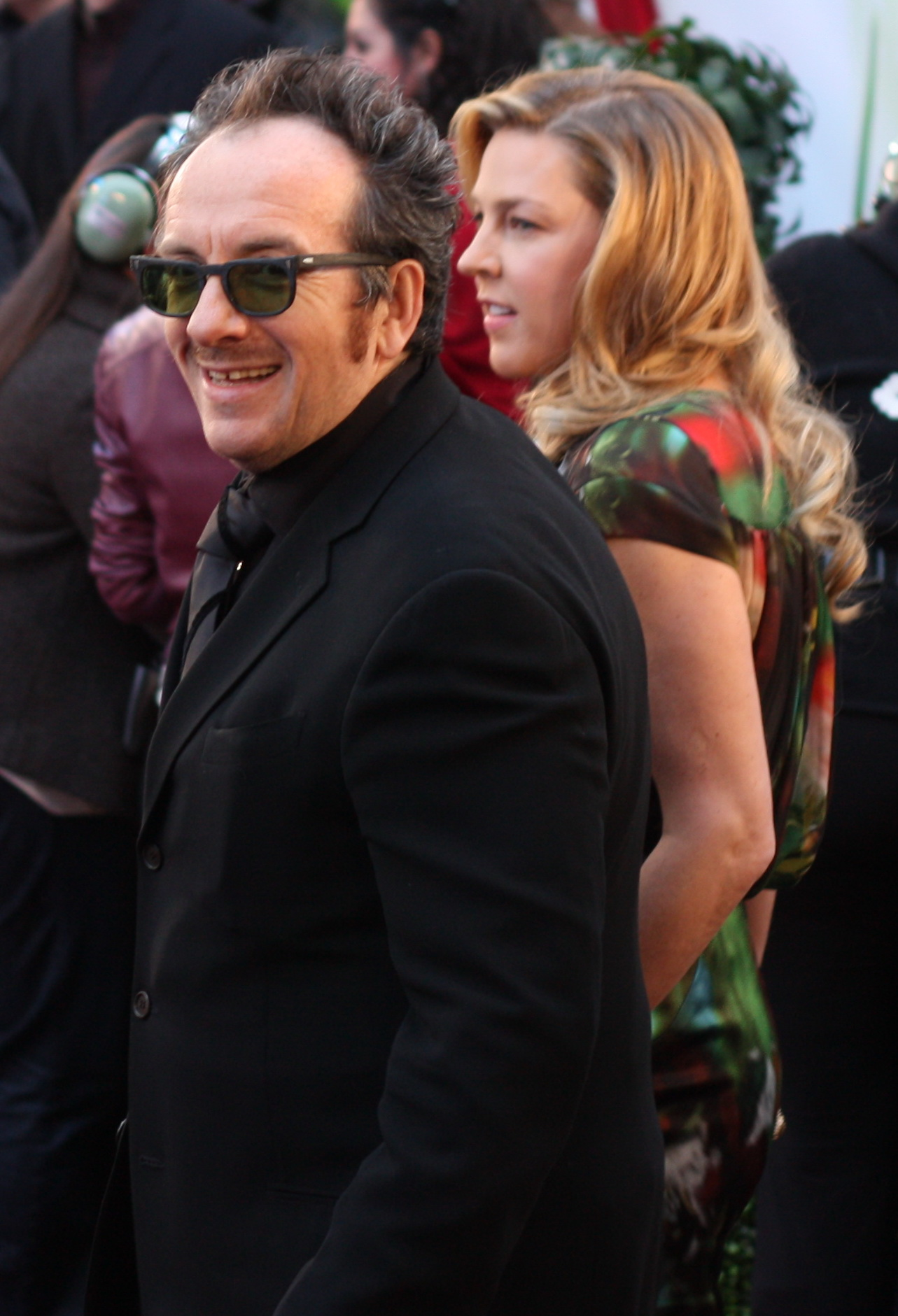
Krall with husband Elvis Costello in 2009

Krall and British musician Elvis Costello were married on December 6, 2003, at Elton John's estate outside London. Their twin sons, Dexter Henry Lorcan and Frank Harlan James, were born December 6, 2006, in New York City. Krall's father-in-law was the singer Ross MacManus.

Krall's mother died of multiple myeloma in 2002, within months of the deaths of Krall's mentors Ray Brown and Rosemary Clooney.

== Honours ==
=== Canadian honours ===
==== National honours ====
- Officer of the Order of Canada – 2005

==== Provincial and territorial honours ====
- Member of the Order of British Columbia – 2000

=== Honorary doctorates ===
- Honorary Ph.D. (Fine Arts) from the University of Victoria

=== Other awards and recognitions ===
- Induction into Canada's Walk of Fame – 2004
- Nanaimo Harbourfront Plaza was renamed Diana Krall Plaza – 2008
- Honorary Board Member of the Multiple Myeloma Research Foundation
- Steinway & Sons Artist, performing exclusively with Steinway pianos in recording sessions, concerts, and public appearances

== Discography ==
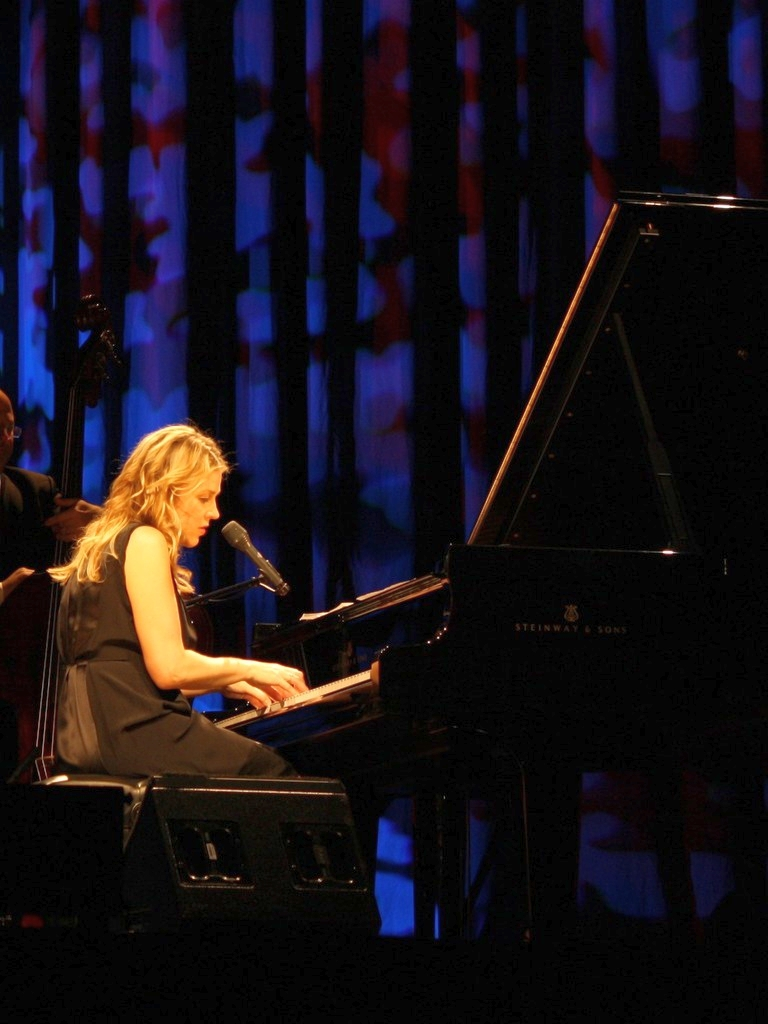
Krall performing in Cologne, Germany, in October 2009

- Stepping Out (1993)
- Only Trust Your Heart (1995)
- All for You: A Dedication to the Nat King Cole Trio (1996)
- Love Scenes (1997)
- When I Look in Your Eyes (1999)
- The Look of Love (2001)
- Live in Paris (2002) (aka A Night in Paris)
- The Girl in the Other Room (2004)
- Live at the Montreal Jazz Festival (2004)
- Christmas Songs (2005)
- From This Moment On (2006)
- Quiet Nights (2009)
- Glad Rag Doll (2012)
- Wallflower (2015)
- Turn Up the Quiet (2017)
- Love Is Here to Stay with Tony Bennett (2018)
- This Dream of You (2020)

== Filmography ==
List of television and film credits
Year	Title	Role	Notes
1999	At First Sight	Singer	Sings "Mack the Knife"
1997–1998	Melrose Place	Herself	"A Shot in the Dark" (Season 6, Episode 8, uncredited) "Ball N' Jane" (Season 7, Episode 4)
2001	Jazz Seen: The Life and Times of William Claxton	Herself	Documentary
2003	Anything Else	Herself	Sings "It Could Happen to You"
2003	De-Lovely	Musical Performer	Sings "Just One of Those Things"
2005	Mississippi Rising	Herself	TV documentary
2008–2009	Spectacle: Elvis Costello with...	Herself	"Tony Bennett" (Season 1, Episode 5) "Diana Krall Interviewed by Elton John" (Season 1, Episode 12)
2009	Public Enemies	Torch Singer	Sings "Bye Bye Blackbird"
2017–2019	Pete the Cat	Pete's Mom (voice)	Season 1 only (replaced by KT Tunstall)

== See also ==
- Wallflower World Tour (2016)

Awards and achievements
Preceded by Jann Arden	Juno Award for Artist of the Year; 2002	Succeeded by Shania Twain
