= Tommy LiPuma =

Background information
- Birth name: Thomas LiPuma
- Born: July 5, 1936; Cleveland, Ohio, U.S.
- Died: March 13, 2017 (aged 80); New York City, New York, U.S.
- Genres: Jazz, rhythm and blues
- Occupation: Record producer
- Years active: 1960s–2017
- Labels: Liberty/Imperial (1961–1965); A&M (1965–1969); Blue Thumb Records (1968–1974); Warner Bros. (1974–1978); A&M/Horizon (1978–1979); Warner Bros. (1979–1990); Elektra Records (1990–1995); GRP/Verve (1994–2011)
- Formerly of: George Benson; Michael Franks; Diana Krall

Tommy LiPuma (July 5, 1936 – March 13, 2017) was an American music producer. His productions received 33 Grammy nominations and sold over 75 million albums. His six individual nominations resulted in five Grammy wins. LiPuma worked with many musicians, including Barbra Streisand, Miles Davis, Bill Evans, George Benson, Phil Upchurch, Al Jarreau, Anita Baker, Natalie Cole, Gábor Szabó, Claudine Longet, Dave Mason, the Yellowjackets, the Sandpipers, Michael Franks, Diana Krall, Paul McCartney, Ben Sidran, The Crusaders, Joe Sample, Randy Crawford and Dr. John. In 2020, his biography, The Ballad of Tommy LiPuma, written by Ben Sidran and published by Nardis Books, was named "the music biography of the year" by The New York City Jazz Record.

== Career ==
LiPuma was born in Cleveland, the fourth of five children. His parents were immigrants from Italy. When LiPuma was a child, an extended bone infection caused him to find solace with a bedside radio, where he discovered rhythm-and-blues and jazz artists of that time – Little Jimmy Scott, Ruth Brown, Big Maybelle, Charles Brown and Nat Cole. Inspired by the music, he began taking lessons on the tenor saxophone. While playing in local big bands, he also attended barber school, intending to follow in his father's footsteps. However, a chance opportunity to go on tour with a band changed his plans. His first real job in the music business was as an entry-level employee for a local Cleveland music distributor, M.S. Distributors, where eventually he became the local promotions representative.

=== Liberty/Imperial and A&M ===
In 1961, LiPuma worked as a promotional representative for Liberty Records which eventually acquired Imperial Records and its publishing catalog. From here, LiPuma began working in music publishing, but also produced demo sessions for young songwriters such as Jackie DeShannon, Randy Newman and P.J. Proby. In late 1964, LiPuma produced his first recording for release with fellow Clevelanders The O'Jays, yielding the Top 40 R&B hit, "Lipstick Traces". In 1965, Herb Alpert and Jerry Moss hired him to be the first staff producer for their A&M label. Over the next four years, he produced the Top 40 hits, "Guantanamera" for the Sandpipers, "The More I See You" for Chris Montez; and gold albums for French singer Claudine Longet (Claudine and The Look of Love). He delivered dialogue in Claudine Longet's 1968 single "A Walk in the Park".

=== Blue Thumb ===
Inspired by the cultural changes of the late 1960s, including such events as the Monterey Pop Festival, LiPuma formed the Blue Thumb label with Bob Krasnow in 1968. Feeling that his productions for A&M were pigeonholed to a certain style, LiPuma saw this as a chance to expand his musical horizons. Phil Upchurch, a label signing, said that Tommy LiPuma had the best ears in the record industry. Blue Thumb Records assembled an eclectic roster of musical talent, also including Ben Sidran, Gerry Rafferty, The Credibility Gap, The Crusaders, Hugh Masekela, Ike & Tina Turner, the Pointer Sisters, Dave Mason, Gabor Szabo, João Donato, The Jazz Crusaders, Southwind, Mark-Almond, Nick DeCaro, comedy troupe National Lampoon, and Dan Hicks and His Hot Licks.

=== Columbia Records and Warner Bros. Records ===
In 1974, LiPuma took on a production assignment for Columbia Records (as Blue Thumb's co-owner, he could freelance at will), working with Barbra Streisand to create an album featuring the theme song to the film The Way We Were. By late 1974, he joined Warner Bros. Records as an A&R staff producer. It was at Warner Bros. that he had his first multi-platinum success with George Benson's 1976 album Breezin', winning his first Grammy for the track "This Masquerade". Further chart success continued with music by Michael Franks, Al Jarreau, Stuff, Eumir Deodato, Bill Evans, Antônio Carlos Jobim, João Gilberto and Dan Hicks.

=== A&M/Horizon and Warner Bros. Records ===
From 1978–79, LiPuma was hired to handle Horizon Records, an imprint of A&M, where he worked with Brenda Russell, the Yellow Magic Orchestra, Seawind, Dr. John and Neil Larsen. At the end of 1979, he became Vice President of Jazz and Progressive Music at Warner Bros. Records. For a little over a decade at Warner Bros., he produced records for Randy Crawford, Brenda Russell, Peabo Bryson, Patti Austin, the Yellowjackets, Michael Brecker, David Sanborn, Bob James, Miles Davis, Earl Klugh, Randy Newman, Dr. John, Aztec Camera and Everything But The Girl.

=== Elektra Records ===
In 1990, LiPuma left Warner Bros. to become Senior Vice-President at Elektra Records. There he executive produced Natalie Cole's Unforgettable... with Love, producing eight tracks on the album. It was one of his most commercially successful projects, certified seven times platinum and winning three Grammy awards, including LiPuma's second of three. He revived the career of Little Jimmy Scott at Sire Records and produced the soundtrack for David Mamet's film Glengarry Glen Ross.

=== GRP/Verve Records ===
From 1994 to 2011, LiPuma worked for GRP and Verve Records. At the beginning of his tenure he met singer and pianist Diana Krall, eventually leading to long history of successful collaborative efforts amounting to around a dozen albums. Her album, When I Look In Your Eyes, sold 2 million copies and was nominated for Album of the Year. Her next album The Look of Love, debuted in the Top 10 of the Billboard's Albums chart, selling over 4 million copies globally. Krall's 2002 album, Live in Paris, netted LiPuma his third Grammy.

From 2004 to 2011 he was Chairman Emeritus at Verve. While at Verve, LiPuma was able to freelance again, producing tracks for non-Verve artists such as Michael Bublé, Willie Nelson, Barbra Streisand, Joe Sample & Randy Crawford (PRA Records), Luis Salinas, and Paul McCartney (producing the ex-Beatle's first-ever standards album, Kisses on the Bottom).

== Personal life ==
Outside of music, LiPuma collected 20th Century American Modern art. Works from his collection, featuring pieces from artists Marsden Hartley, John Marin, Arthur Dove and Alfred Maurer, have been exhibited at various galleries and museums throughout the United States.

On March 26, 2012, Cuyahoga Community College in Cleveland, Ohio, named their new arts studies center the Gill & Tommy LiPuma Center for Creative Arts.

LiPuma died in New York City, at the age of 80.

Business positions
Preceded by –	Chairman of Verve Music Group; 1999–2011	Succeeded by David Foster
