= From This Moment On (album) =

Studio album by Diana Krall
- Released: September 19, 2006
- Recorded: 2006
- Studio: Capitol (Hollywood)
- Genre: Jazz
- Length: 51:29
- Label: Verve
- Producer: Tommy LiPuma; Diana Krall

Diana Krall chronology
Christmas Songs (2005)	From This Moment On (2006)	The Very Best of Diana Krall (2007)

From This Moment On is the ninth studio album by Canadian singer Diana Krall, released on September 19, 2006, by Verve Records. The album debuted atop the Canadian Albums Chart, making it Krall's third consecutive number-one album. It was nominated for Best Jazz Vocal Album at the 2007 Grammy Awards.

== Critical reception ==
Professional ratings
Aggregate scores
Source	Rating
Metacritic	66/100
Review scores
Source	Rating
AllMusic	4/5 stars
Entertainment Weekly	B+
The Guardian	3/5 stars
Tom Hull	A−
The Scotsman	4/5 stars
The Penguin Guide to Jazz Recordings	3.5/4 stars

Christopher Loudon of JazzTimes wrote, "Never before, though, have her vocals or her playing evoked such profound contentment and easy self-assurance. Nor has any previous Krall standards set displayed such tremendous stylistic breadth." John Fordham of The Guardian stated that "From This Moment On is full of classy execution, but it's familiar territory for Krall and her fans.

David Was of NPR commented that "Diana Krall is the undisputed superstar of jazz-inflected singers in the last decade or so, and her new album on Verve, From This Moment On—mostly standards done with big-band arrangements—is a return to her usual form". Jane Cornwell of Jazzwise added, "Krall's skills as a pianist have never been in doubt but here her voice seems richer, her phrasing more natural, her timing very often inspired – particularly on an unhurried, soon-come version of Irving Berlin's 'Isn't It A Lovely Day'. It's the ensemble playing, though, which really marks this out as a good 'un – the thoughtful guitar of Anthony Wilson on 'Exactly Like You'; Terrell Stafford's trumpet solo on 'Isn't This...', the musical empathy throughout. Sure, it would be nice to have more Krall originals. But for the time being, here's the gal at her best".

== Track listing ==
No.	Title	Writer(s)	Length
1.	"It Could Happen to You"	Jimmy Van Heusen; Johnny Burke	3:29
2.	"Isn't This a Lovely Day"	Irving Berlin	6:07
3.	"How Insensitive"	Antônio Carlos Jobim; Vinicius de Moraes; Norman Gimbel	5:20
4.	"Exactly Like You"	Jimmy McHugh; Dorothy Fields	3:03
5.	"From This Moment On"	Cole Porter	3:24
6.	"I Was Doing All Right"	George Gershwin; Ira Gershwin	5:11
7.	"Little Girl Blue"	Richard Rodgers; Lorenz Hart	5:38
8.	"Day In Day Out"	Rube Bloom; Johnny Mercer	3:59
9.	"Willow Weep for Me"	Ann Ronell	5:38
10.	"Come Dance with Me"	Van Heusen; Sammy Cahn	4:23
11.	"It Was a Beautiful Day in August/You Can Depend on Me"	Ray Brown; Charles Carpenter; Louis Dunlap; Earl Hines	5:17

Non-North American edition bonus track
No.	Title	Writer(s)	Length
12.	"The Boulevard of Broken Dreams"	Al Dubin; Harry Warren	5:35

Target exclusive edition bonus track
No.	Title	Writer(s)	Length
12.	"My Shining Hour"	Harold Arlen; Mercer	4:31

Best Buy exclusive edition bonus track
No.	Title	Writer(s)	Length
12.	"Something's Gotta Give"	Mercer	2:50

== Personnel ==
Credits adapted from the liner notes of the European edition of From This Moment On.

=== Musicians ===
- Diana Krall – vocals (all tracks); piano solo (tracks 1, 8, 9); piano (tracks 2–4, 6, 7, 10–12); arrangement (tracks 4, 6, 7, 11, 12)
- Gerald Clayton – piano (tracks 1, 5, 8, 10, 12)
- The Clayton–Hamilton Jazz Orchestra – featured artist (tracks 1–3, 5, 8–10)
- Jeff Clayton – alto saxophone solo (track 2); soprano saxophone solo (track 9)
- Terell Stafford – trumpet solo (tracks 2, 5, 9, 10)
- Ira Nepus – trombone solo (track 2)
- Anthony Wilson – acoustic guitar (track 3); guitar (tracks 4, 6, 7, 11, 12)
- John Clayton – bass (tracks 4, 6, 7, 11); arrangement, conducting (tracks 1–3, 5, 8–10)
- Jeff Hamilton – drums (tracks 4, 6, 7, 11, 12)
- Gil Castellanos – trumpet solo (track 5)
- Tamir Hendelman – piano (track 9)
- Rickey Woodard – tenor saxophone solo (track 10)

=== Technical ===
- Tommy LiPuma – production
- Diana Krall – production
- Al Schmitt – mixing, recording
- Steve Genewick – Pro Tools engineering, recording
- Rick Fernandez – engineering assistance
- Dan Johnson – engineering assistance
- Joe Napolitano – engineering assistance
- Bill Smith – engineering assistance
- Paul Smith – engineering assistance
- Doug Sax – mastering
- Sangwook Nam – mastering

=== Artwork ===
- Hollis King – art direction
- Coco Shinomiya – design
- Bruce Weber – photography
- Sam Taylor-Wood – back cover photo

== Charts ==
=== Weekly charts ===
Chart (2006)	Peak position
Australian Albums (ARIA)	28
Australian Jazz & Blues Albums (ARIA)	1
Austrian Albums (Ö3 Austria)	15
Belgian Albums (Ultratop Flanders)	14
Belgian Albums (Ultratop Wallonia)	10
Canadian Albums (Billboard)	1
Czech Albums (ČNS IFPI)	35
Danish Albums (Hitlisten)	15
Dutch Albums (Album Top 100)	16
European Albums (Billboard)	4
French Albums (SNEP)	6
German Albums (Offizielle Top 100)	16
Greek Albums (IFPI)	10
Hungarian Albums (MAHASZ)	4
Italian Albums (FIMI)	8
Japanese Albums (Oricon)	34
New Zealand Albums (RMNZ)	17
Norwegian Albums (VG-lista)	17
Polish Albums (ZPAV)	4
Portuguese Albums (AFP)	4
Scottish Albums (OCC)	50
Spanish Albums (PROMUSICAE)	8
Swedish Albums (Sverigetopplistan)	5
Swedish Jazz Albums (Sverigetopplistan)	1
Swiss Albums (Schweizer Hitparade)	15
UK Albums (OCC)	29
UK Jazz & Blues Albums (OCC)	1
US Billboard 200	7
US Top Jazz Albums (Billboard)	1
US Traditional Jazz Albums (Billboard)	1

=== Year-end charts ===
Chart (2006)	Position
Australian Jazz & Blues Albums (ARIA)	7
Hungarian Albums (MAHASZ)	75
US Top Jazz Albums (Billboard)	5

Chart (2007)	Position
Australian Jazz & Blues Albums (ARIA)	12

=== Decade-end charts ===
Chart (2000–2009)	Position
US Top Jazz Albums (Billboard)	19

== Certifications ==
Region	Certification	Certified units/sales
Canada (Music Canada)	2× Platinum	200,000^{^}
Hungary (MAHASZ)	Gold	3,000^{^}
Poland (ZPAV)	Platinum	20,000^{*}
Portugal (AFP)	Gold	10,000^{^}
Russia (NFPF)	Gold	10,000^{*}
Spain (PROMUSICAE)	Gold	40,000^{^}
^{*} Sales figures based on certification alone.^{^} Shipments figures based on certification alone.
