= Quiet Nights (Diana Krall album) =

Studio album by Diana Krall
- Released: March 31, 2009
- Recorded: 2009
- Studios: Capitol (Hollywood, California)
- Genres: Jazz; bossa nova
- Length: 54:34
- Label: Verve
- Producers: Tommy LiPuma; Diana Krall

Diana Krall chronology
The Very Best of Diana Krall (2007)	Quiet Nights (2009)	Glad Rag Doll (2012)

Quiet Nights is the tenth studio album by Canadian singer Diana Krall, released on March 31, 2009, by Verve Records.

== Background ==
The album marks Krall's first work with arranger Claus Ogerman since 2002's Live in Paris, and her first studio work with Ogerman since 2001's The Look of Love. In 2010, the title track earned Claus Ogerman the Grammy Award for Best Instrumental Arrangement Accompanying Vocalist(s).

The album's title comes from the English-language title of the bossa nova standard "Corcovado", written by Antonio Carlos Jobim and first made popular in the early 1960s. The title track is one of three selections written or co-written by Jobim. Krall had previously included the Jobim-penned "How Insensitive" ("Insensatez") on her 2006 release From This Moment On, and performed Jobim's "The Girl from Ipanema" (retitled "The Boy from Ipanema") with Rosemary Clooney on the latter's 2000 album Brazil.

== Critical reception ==
Professional ratings
Aggregate scores
Source	Rating
Metacritic	74/100
Review scores
Source	Rating
AllMusic	3.5/5 stars
Entertainment Weekly	B+
The Guardian	3/5 stars
Tom Hull	A−
Los Angeles Times	2.5/4 stars
The Observer	4/5 stars
The Phoenix	3.5/4 stars
PopMatters	5/10
Record Collector	4/5 stars
Toronto Star	3/4 stars

Quiet Nights received generally positive reviews from music critics. At Metacritic, which assigns a normalized rating out of 100 to reviews from mainstream publications, the album received an average score of 74, based on 12 reviews.

Jon Caramanica of The New York Times wrote, "The sound and style are the same as for The Look of Love, with Claus Ogerman's billowing strings and woodwinds conjuring a romantic atmosphere with film-noir overtones. Ms. Krall's supple keyboard solos trickle in and out of the orchestration like pianistic pillow talk. She has lowered her voice to a husky near-murmur, as though she were luxuriating in the afterglow of passion on tangled sheets. The forerunners for this excursion into soft-focus eroticism are the ballad albums of Peggy Lee and Julie London".

Steve Greelee of The Boston Globe noted, "The line between dreamy and sleepy is a fine one, and many jazz singers have fallen on the wrong side of it when attempting bossa nova. Diana Krall, however, negotiates it skillfully on Quiet Nights, her first album of all bossas. It probably has a lot to do with her honeyed voice, her laid-back delivery, and her experience – she has 11 albums and 15 years of recording under her belt".

== Commercial performance ==
Quiet Nights debuted at number three on the Canadian Albums Chart, selling 24,000 copies in its first week. Five weeks later, the album peaked at number two with 11,000 units sold. In the United States, it sold 104,000 copies to debut at number three on the Billboard 200, becoming her highest-charting album on the chart and at number one on the Top Jazz Albums, becoming Krall's ninth number-one album on the latter chart.

In mainland Europe, the album reached the top spot in Hungary, Poland, and Portugal, and charted inside the top five in Austria, France, Greece, Norway, and Spain, as well as on the European Top 100 Albums chart. It also debuted on the New Zealand RIANZ chart at number two. In late 2009, Billboard ranked Quiet Nights at number 25 on the Top Jazz Albums decade-end chart of the 2000s.

== Track listing ==
No.	Title	Lyrics	Music	Length
1.	"Where or When"	Lorenz Hart	Richard Rodgers	4:09
2.	"Too Marvelous for Words"	Johnny Mercer	Richard A. Whiting	4:03
3.	"I've Grown Accustomed to His Face"	Alan Jay Lerner	Frederick Loewe	4:46
4.	"The Boy from Ipanema"	Norman Gimbel; Vinicius de Moraes	Antônio Carlos Jobim	4:52
5.	"Walk On By"	Hal David	Burt Bacharach	5:01
6.	"You're My Thrill"	Sidney Clare	Jay Gorney	5:47
7.	"Este Seu Olhar"	Jobim	Jobim	2:45
8.	"So Nice"	Paulo Sérgio Valle; Gimbel (English words)	Marcos Kostenbader Valle	3:50
9.	"Quiet Nights"	Gene Lees; Buddy Kaye	Jobim	4:45
10.	"Guess I'll Hang My Tears Out to Dry"	Sammy Cahn	Jule Styne	4:49
11.	"How Can You Mend a Broken Heart" (bonus track)	Barry Gibb; Robin Gibb	B. Gibb; R. Gibb	4:28
12.	"Every Time We Say Goodbye" (bonus track)	Cole Porter	Porter	5:19
Total length:				54:34

iTunes Store bonus tracks
No.	Title	Writer(s)	Length
13.	"For No One"	John Lennon; Paul McCartney	2:58
14.	"I See Your Face Before Me"	Howard Dietz; Arthur Schwartz	5:04
Total length:			62:36

Deluxe edition bonus DVD
No.	Title	Length
1.	"I Love Being Here with You"
2.	"Boy from Ipanema"
3.	"Exactly Like You"
4.	"Quiet Nights"
5.	"You're My Thrill"
6.	"I Don't Know Enough About You"
7.	"Let's Fall in Love"
8.	"Makin' Whoopee" (with Elvis Costello and Elton John)

=== Notes ===
- Tracks 1–7 on the deluxe edition bonus DVD were recorded live at ORCAM's auditorium in Madrid, Spain, on May 29, 2009; track 8 is taken from Spectacle: Elvis Costello with...

== Personnel ==
Credits adapted from the liner notes of Quiet Nights.

=== Musicians ===
- Diana Krall – vocals, piano
- Anthony Wilson – guitar (tracks 1–10)
- John Clayton – bass (tracks 1–10)
- Jeff Hamilton – drums (tracks 1–10)
- Paulinho da Costa – percussion (tracks 1, 2, 4, 5, 7–9)
- Claus Ogerman – arrangement, conducting

=== Orchestra ===
- Eun Mee Ahn, Charlie Bisharat, Caroline Campbell, Darius Campo, Mario de Leon, Yue Deng, Bruce Dukov (concertmaster), David Ewart, Alan Grunfeld, Tammy Hatwan, Peter Kent, Razdan Kuyumjian, Liane Mautner, Helen Nightengale, Sid Page (concertmaster), Joel Pargman, Katia Popov, Barbara Porter, Gil Romero, Tereza Stanislav, Mari Tsumura, Josephina Vergara, Amy Wickman, Tiffany Yi Hu – violins
- Thomas Dienner, Marlo Fisher, Matt Funes, Janet Lakatos, Vicki Miskolczy, Dan Neufeld, Kate Reddish, Todd Marda, David Walther, Evan Wilson – violas
- Larry Corbett (first), Antony Cooke, Vanessa Freebairn-Smith, Trevor Handy, Timothy Landauer, Steve Richards, Dan Smith, Rudy Stein, Cecilia Tsan – celli
- Nico Carmine Abondolo, Drew Dembowski, Reggie Hamilton, Ed Meares (first), Sue Ranney – basses
- Heather Clark, Steve Kujala, Geri Rotella, David Shostac – alto flutes, bass flutes
- Bill Lane, Joseph Meyer, Todd Miller, Rick Todd (first), Brad Warnaar – French horns
- Earl Dumler – oboe
- Doug Tornquist – tuba
- Robert Zimmitti – vibes

=== Technical ===
- Tommy LiPuma – production
- Diana Krall – production
- Al Schmitt – recording, mixing
- Steve Genewick – recording
- Rick Fernandez – engineering assistance
- Dan Johnson – engineering assistance
- Doug Sax – mastering
- Sangwook Nam – mastering

=== Artwork ===
- Hollis King – art direction
- Philip Manning – design
- Robert Maxwell – photography
- Daniel Behr – beach photo

== Charts ==
=== Weekly charts ===
Chart (2009)	Peak position
Australian Albums (ARIA)	14
Australian Jazz & Blues Albums (ARIA)	1
Austrian Albums (Ö3 Austria)	3
Belgian Albums (Ultratop Flanders)	8
Belgian Albums (Ultratop Wallonia)	7
Canadian Albums (Billboard)	2
Croatian Albums (HDU)	17
Czech Albums (ČNS IFPI)	13
Danish Albums (Hitlisten)	16
Dutch Albums (Album Top 100)	15
European Albums (Billboard)	3
Finnish Albums (Suomen virallinen lista)	35
French Albums (SNEP)	3
German Albums (Offizielle Top 100)	7
Greek Albums (IFPI)	12
Hungarian Albums (MAHASZ)	1
Italian Albums (FIMI)	8
Japanese Albums (Oricon)	21
Mexican Albums (Top 100 Mexico)	24
New Zealand Albums (RMNZ)	2
Norwegian Albums (VG-lista)	2
Polish Albums (ZPAV)	1
Portuguese Albums (AFP)	1
Scottish Albums (Official Charts)	18
Spanish Albums (Promusicae)	3
Swedish Albums (Sverigetopplistan)	18
Swedish Jazz Albums (Sverigetopplistan)	1
Swiss Albums (Schweizer Hitparade)	10
UK Albums (Official Charts)	11
UK Jazz & Blues Albums (Official Charts)	1
US Billboard 200	3
US Top Jazz Albums (Billboard)	1
US Traditional Jazz Albums (Billboard)	1

=== Year-end charts ===
Chart (2009)	Position
Australian Jazz & Blues Albums (ARIA)	1
Belgian Albums (Ultratop Wallonia)	67
Canadian Albums (Billboard)	21
European Albums (Billboard)	51
French Albums (SNEP)	61
Hungarian Albums (MAHASZ)	14
Polish Albums (ZPAV)	35
US Billboard 200	91
US Top Jazz Albums (Billboard)	2

Chart (2010)	Position
Australian Jazz & Blues Albums (ARIA)	13
US Top Jazz Albums (Billboard)	11

=== Decade-end charts ===
Chart (2000–2009)	Position
US Top Jazz Albums (Billboard)	25

== Certifications ==
Region	Certification	Certified units/sales
Australia (ARIA)	Gold	35,000^{^}
Austria (IFPI Austria)	Gold	10,000^{*}
France (SNEP)	Gold	50,000^{*}
Hungary (MAHASZ)	Platinum	6,000^{^}
New Zealand (RMNZ)	Gold	7,500^{^}
Poland (ZPAV)	Platinum	20,000^{*}
Portugal (AFP)	Platinum	20,000^{^}
Spain (Promusicae)	Gold	40,000^{^}
^{*} Sales figures based on certification alone.^{^} Shipments figures based on certification alone.
