= Tamir Hendelman =

Israeli-American jazz pianist

Tamir Hendelman תמיר הנדלמן
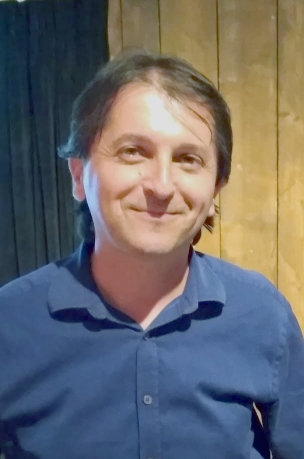
- Handelman in September 2019

Background information
- Origin: Israel
- Genres: Jazz, Brazilian
- Occupations: Educator, musician, composer
- Instrument: Piano
- Years active: 1986–present
- Label: Resonance
- Website: tamirhendelman.com

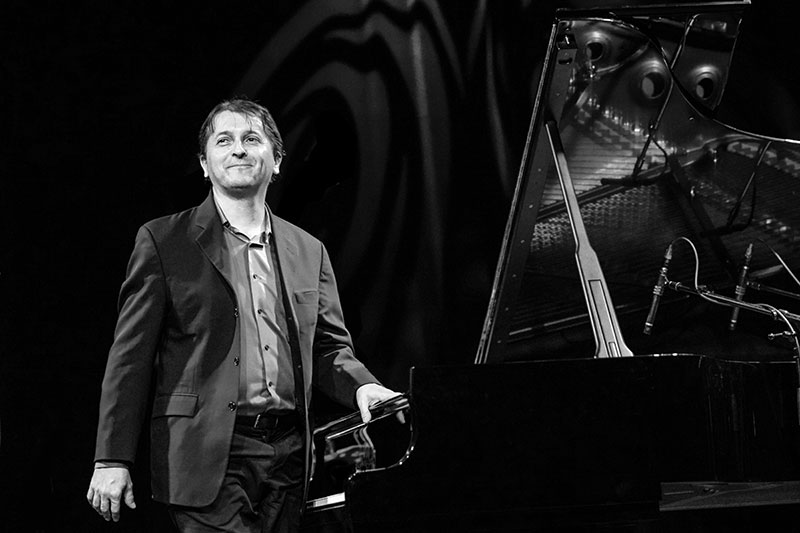
Tamir Hendelman (2018) in Aarhus, Denmark Photo Hreinn Gudluagsson

Tamir Hendelman (Hebrew: תמיר הנדלמן; born 1971) is an Israeli-American jazz pianist.

Hendelman has performed with the Jeff Hamilton Trio, the Clayton-Hamilton Jazz Orchestra, Harry Allen, Teddy Edwards, Warren Vaché, Houston Person, Jeff Clayton, Nick Brignola, Phil Upchurch, Rickey Woodard, John Clayton and Barbara Morrison. He also leads his own trio and his debut CD Playground features him in this trio setting. His album Destinations features Lewis Nash and Marco Panascia. The album reached number one on the JazzWeek Jazz Charts in September 2010.

== Biography ==
Born in Tel Aviv, Israel, Tamir Hendelman began his keyboard studies at age 6. In 1984, he moved to the United States and won Yamaha's National Keyboard competition two years later at age 14. Concerts in Japan and the Kennedy Center followed.

He then studied at the Tanglewood Institute in 1988 and received a Bachelor of Music Composition degree from Eastman School of Music in 1993. He became the youngest musical director for Lovewell Institute for the Creative Arts, a national arts education non-profit organization.

Since returning to Los Angeles in 1996, he has been in steady demand as pianist and arranger, touring the US, Europe, and Asia. He has also received awards from ASCAP and the National Foundation for Advancement in the Arts. In 1999, Tamir was a guest soloist with the Henry Mancini Institute Orchestra.

Hendelman is the pianist/arranger on Jackie Ryan's "You and the Night and the Music" and Janis Mann's "A Perfect Time". He is also featured on Natalie Cole's "Still Unforgettable" (WEA, 2008) and Barbra Streisand's Love Is the Answer (Columbia, 2009). In 2002 he also toured Europe with Tierney Sutton and the Bill Holman Big Band. Hendelman musically directed Julia Migenes's "Alter Ego" and played/arranged on Roberta Gambarini's "Easy To Love" (Now Forward, 2006). In 2009, he accompanied Streisand at her engagement to the Village Vanguard in New York.

He is also bandleader of another trio in Los Angeles. The drummer Dean Koba has been part of it for years; on bass it's Dan Lutz or Carlito del Puerto.

Hendelman is married and has two daughters.

== Jeff Hamilton Trio ==
Hendelman joined the Jeff Hamilton Trio in 2000, contributing arrangements, recording and touring Japan, Europe and the US. In 2001 he became a member of the Clayton-Hamilton Jazz Orchestra, with whom he premiered John Clayton's new orchestration of Oscar Peterson's Canadiana Suite at the Hollywood Bowl in 2001.

== Clayton-Hamilton Jazz Orchestra ==
With the CHJO, Tamir has recorded for John Pizzarelli, Gladys Knight and Diana Krall.

== Discography ==
- Destinations (Resonance, 2010) with Lewis Nash and Marco Panascia
- Playground (2008) with Jeff Hamilton and John Clayton
