= The Clayton Brothers =

American jazz group

- Genres: Jazz
- Years active: 1977–present
- Spinoffs: The Clayton Brothers Quintet
- Members: John Clayton; Jeff Clayton; Terell Stafford; Gerald Clayton; Obed Calvaire
- Website: claytonbrothersjazz.com

The Clayton Brothers is the brain child of saxophonist Jeff Clayton. According to Jeff, some 30 years ago he and his brother, Grammy Award-winning bassist John Clayton, agreed to support each other's preferred formats. Jeff's love of small groups lead to formation of the Clayton Brothers Quintet. John's love for big bands led to formation of The Clayton–Hamilton Jazz Orchestra with drummer Jeff Hamilton, of which brother Jeff is a part. The current roster of the Clayton Brothers Quintet includes John Clayton, along with John's son Gerald Clayton (piano), Obed Calvaire (drums) and Terell Stafford (trumpet). The band's latest album, The Gathering, was released in December 2012. Jeff Clayton died on December 16, 2020, after suffering from kidney cancer. He was 66 years old.

== Personnel ==
=== Jeff Clayton ===
Jeff Clayton was a multi-instrumentalist who played reed instruments, alto saxophone and oboe, in addition to the French horn and flute. He has performed and recorded with various well known musicians such as Stevie Wonder, Gladys Knight, Kenny Rogers, Michael Jackson, Chaka Khan, Queen Latifah, Patti LaBelle, Earth, Wind & Fire, Barry Manilow, D. J. Rogers, Madonna, Justin Timberlake, Quincy Jones, Valerie King, and Helen Baylor. He also has worked with numerous well-known jazz artists such as B.B. King, Frank Sinatra, Ella Fitzgerald, Sammy Davis Jr., Woody Herman, Lionel Hampton, Diana Krall, Freddie Hubbard, Lena Horne, McCoy Tyner, John Pizzarelli, Dee Dee Bridgewater, and Ray Charles.

=== John Clayton ===
John Clayton is a bassist, composer, arranger, and conductor. He was the artistic director of Jazz for the Los Angeles Philharmonic from 1998 through 2001. His work was recognized by NARA and was nominated for multiple Grammy awards. He received a Grammy award in the category Instrumental Arrangement Accompanying Vocalist for Queen Latifah's "I'm Gonna Live Till I Die", as arranger in 2008. He has written and/or arranged music for Milt Jackson, Nancy Wilson, Ray Brown, Regina Carter, McCoy Tyner, Carmen McRae, Quincy Jones, Diana Krall, Kurt Elling, Dee Dee Bridgewater, Gladys Knight, Natalie Cole, and Whitney Houston, among others.

== Discography ==
- It's All in the Family (Concord, 1980)
- The Music (Capri, 1991)
- Expressions (Warner Bros., 1997)
- Siblingity (Warner Bros., 2000)
- Back in the Swing oh Things (Sindrome, 2005)
- Brother to Brother (ArtistShare, 2008)
- The Gathering (ArtistShare, 2012)
- Soul Brothers (ArtistShare, 2015)

== Brother to Brother ==
=== ArtistShare project: Brother to Brother ===
ArtistShare has been well known for their "fan-funded" projects. The Clayton Brothers joined ArtistShare to provide unique participant offers to let their fans to have exclusive access to videos, audio shows, downloads, photos and updates on the project. If participants fund the project at higher level, they can have an autographed and personalized CD, narrated listening guide to the recordings by the artists, an iPod pre-loaded with the artists' favorite music, VIP access to performances with backstage access etc.

=== Reviews ===
Brother to Brother has been receiving reviews that highly value the album.

- New York Times
- Hartford Courant
- Jazz Review
- Jazz.com
- The Providence American
- Buffalo News
- Cabaret Exchange
