= Live in Rio =

Live in Rio may refer to:

- Live in Rio (James Reyne album)
- Live in Rio (Earth, Wind & Fire album)
- Live in Rio (Diana Krall video)
- Live in Rio (RBD video)
- Live in Rio Jorge Ben
