= Lion's Den (nightclub) =

Music venue in New York City, United States (1990–2007)

Coordinates: 40°43′45″N 74°00′00″W

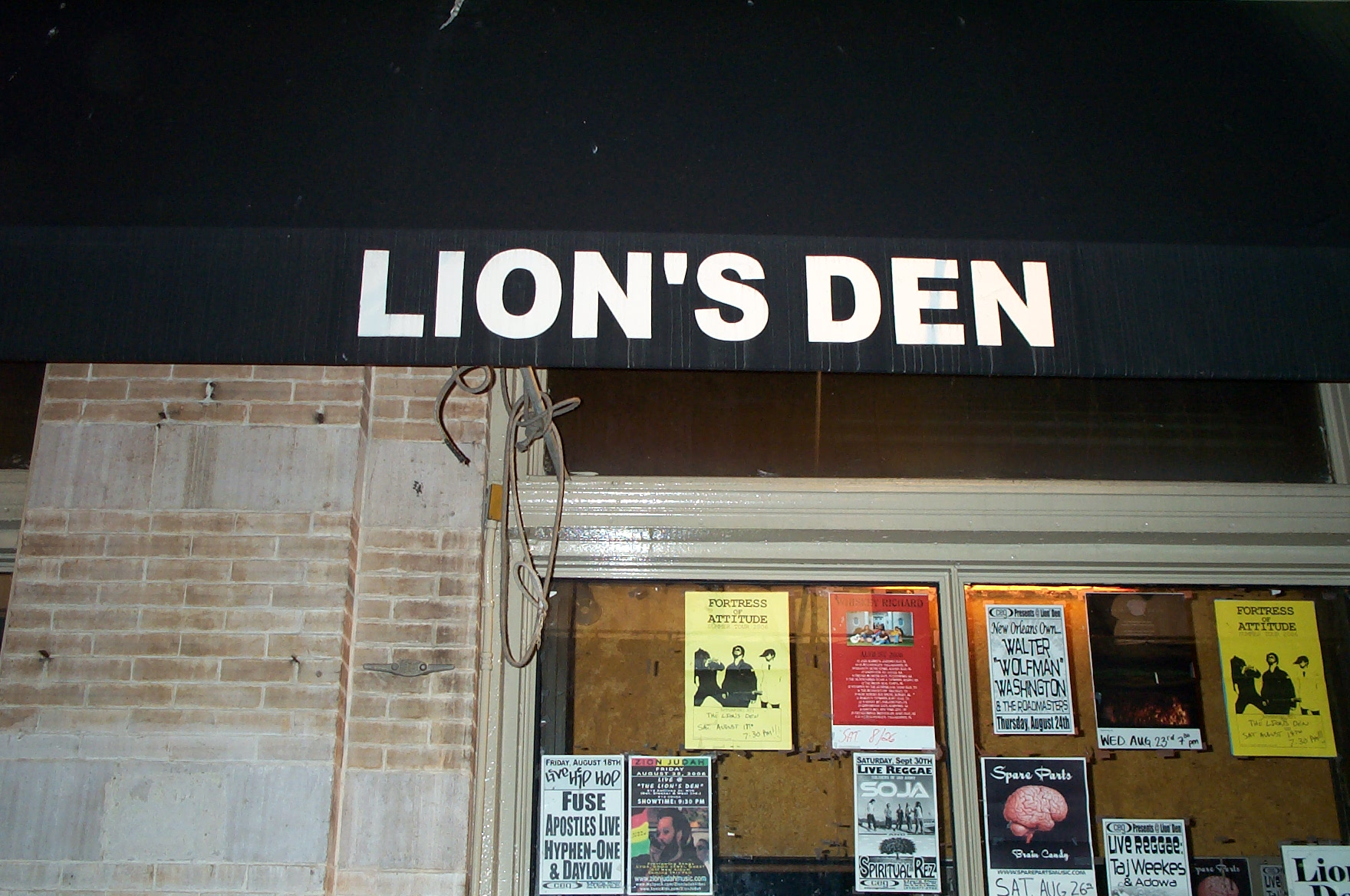

Lion's Den was a music club located at 214 Sullivan Street, between Bleecker Street and West 3rd Street, in the Greenwich Village section of Manhattan in New York City. It opened in 1990 and closed in December 2007.

Performers included Ben Folds, Sloan, Howie Day, Keller Williams, New Found Glory, Rachael Sage, Disco Biscuits, The String Cheese Incident, Pharoahe Monch, Dashboard Confessional, Page McConnell, Sister Hazel, Lady Gaga, Soulive, the dreamscapes project, Fear of Falling, R-Blend, and Mordus.

In January 2008, Lion's Den reopened as Sullivan Hall.
