= The Very Best of Diana Krall =

Greatest hits album by Diana Krall
- Released: September 18, 2007
- Recorded: 1996–2006
- Genre: Jazz
- Length: 75:25
- Label: Verve
- Producers: Tommy LiPuma; Diana Krall

Diana Krall chronology
From This Moment On (2006)	The Very Best of Diana Krall (2007)	Quiet Nights (2009)

The Very Best of Diana Krall is the first greatest hits album by Canadian singer Diana Krall, released on September 18, 2007, by Verve Records.

The album debuted at number 19 on the US Billboard 200, selling 30,000 copies in its first week. Billboard ranked the album at number 33 on the magazine's Top Jazz Albums of the Decade.

== Critical reception ==
Professional ratings
Review scores
Source	Rating
AllMusic	4/5 stars
Tom Hull	B+
laut.de	3/5 stars
Now	3/5
PopMatters	6/10

Christopher Loudon of JazzTimes stated, "The title begs a rather obvious question: Do these 15 tracks, spanning 10 years and six albums*, truly represent the very best of Diana Krall? The answer is equally obvious: of course not. How could they?... Still, semantics aside, there's no denying this is, particularly for Krall neophytes, a lovely assemblage. And, yes, there's also value for those of us whose libraries already house the entire Krall canon." Will Layman of PopMatters mentioned, "Now, we get The Very Best of Diana Krall which is professional, slick-as-a-trick, accomplished and too often dull. But maybe dull is how most people like their jazz." Matt Collar of AllMusic wrote, "The Very Best of Diana Krall collects a nice cross-section of tracks the pianist/vocalist recorded beginning with her 1996 breakthrough album, All for You, and moving through to her 2006 effort From This Moment On. These are largely urbane and stylish recordings... If you're a fan of straight-ahead jazz with a heavy dash of romance and haven't checked out Krall's work, The Very Best is superb place to start."

- Note: the selections are actually from seven albums as two of the tracks are from the "Live In Paris" album.

== Track listing ==
No.	Title	Writer(s)	Length
1.	"'S Wonderful"	George Gershwin; Ira Gershwin	4:26
2.	"Peel Me a Grape"	Dave Frishberg	5:49
3.	"Pick Yourself Up"	Jerome Kern; Dorothy Fields	3:01
4.	"Frim Fram Sauce"	Joe Ricardel; Redd Evans	5:00
5.	"You Go to My Head"	J. Fred Coots; Haven Gillespie	6:46
6.	"Let's Fall in Love"	Ted Koehler; Harold Arlen	4:18
7.	"The Look of Love"	Burt Bacharach; Hal David	4:41
8.	"East of the Sun (and West of the Moon)" (live in Paris)	Brooks Bowman	5:45
9.	"I've Got You Under My Skin"	Cole Porter	6:08
10.	"All or Nothing at All"	Jack Lawrence; Arthur Altman	4:32
11.	"Only the Lonely"	Jimmy Van Heusen; Sammy Cahn	4:16
12.	"Let's Face the Music and Dance"	Irving Berlin	5:17
13.	"The Heart of Saturday Night"	Tom Waits	4:05
14.	"Little Girl Blue"	Richard Rodgers; Lorenz Hart	5:38
15.	"Fly Me to the Moon" (live in Paris)	Bart Howard	5:43

Canadian edition bonus track
No.	Title	Writer(s)	Length
16.	"Narrow Daylight"	Elvis Costello; Diana Krall	3:32

Deluxe edition bonus DVD
No.	Title	Length
1.	"Narrow Daylight" (music video)
2.	"Let's Face the Music and Dance" (music video)
3.	"The Look of Love" (music video)
4.	"Temptation" (live performance)
5.	"Almost Blue" (music video)
6.	"Abandoned Masquerade" (live performance)
7.	"Fly Me to the Moon" (live performance)
8.	"The Girl in the Other Room" (live performance)
9.	"What Are You Doing New Year's Eve" (live in-studio performance)

=== Notes ===
- Tracks 1 and 7 are taken from The Look of Love (2001).
- Tracks 2 and 10 are taken from Love Scenes (1997).
- Tracks 3, 6, 9 and 12 are taken from When I Look in Your Eyes (1999).
- Track 4 is taken from All for You: A Dedication to the Nat King Cole Trio (1996).
- Tracks 5 and 11 are previously unreleased from the sessions for The Look of Love.
- Tracks 8 and 15 are taken from Live in Paris (2002).
- Track 13 is taken from The Girl in the Other Room (2004).
- Track 14 is taken from From This Moment On (2006).
- "Narrow Daylight" is not included on the bonus DVD of the US deluxe edition.

== Charts ==
=== Weekly charts ===
Chart (2007)	Peak position
Australian Albums (ARIA)	40
Australian Jazz & Blues Albums (ARIA)	2
Austrian Albums (Ö3 Austria)	36
Belgian Albums (Ultratop Flanders)	57
Belgian Albums (Ultratop Wallonia)	29
Canadian Albums (Billboard)	6
European Albums (Billboard)	15
French Compilation Albums (SNEP)	9
German Albums (Offizielle Top 100)	52
Greek Albums (IFPI)	13
Hungarian Albums (MAHASZ)	6
Italian Albums (FIMI)	17
Japanese Albums (Oricon)	64
New Zealand Albums (RMNZ)	17
Norwegian Albums (VG-lista)	6
Portuguese Albums (AFP)	3
Scottish Albums (Official Charts)	58
Spanish Albums (Promusicae)	31
Swedish Albums (Sverigetopplistan)	18
Swedish Jazz Albums (Sverigetopplistan)	1
Swiss Albums (Schweizer Hitparade)	25
UK Albums (Official Charts)	35
UK Jazz & Blues Albums (Official Charts)	2
US Billboard 200	19
US Top Jazz Albums (Billboard)	1
US Traditional Jazz Albums (Billboard)	1

Chart (2014)	Peak position
Polish Albums (ZPAV)	1

Chart (2016)	Peak position
Czech Albums (ČNS IFPI)	75

=== Year-end charts ===
Chart (2007)	Position
Australian Jazz & Blues Albums (ARIA)	7
Hungarian Albums (MAHASZ)	66
US Top Jazz Albums (Billboard)	6

Chart (2008)	Position
Australian Jazz & Blues Albums (ARIA)	10
US Top Jazz Albums (Billboard)	3

Chart (2009)	Position
Australian Jazz & Blues Albums (ARIA)	10
US Top Jazz Albums (Billboard)	35

Chart (2010)	Position
Australian Jazz & Blues Albums (ARIA)	9

Chart (2011)	Position
Australian Jazz & Blues Albums (ARIA)	10

Chart (2012)	Position
Australian Jazz & Blues Albums (ARIA)	10

Chart (2013)	Position
Australian Jazz & Blues Albums (ARIA)	11

Chart (2014)	Position
Australian Jazz & Blues Albums (ARIA)	7

Chart (2015)	Position
Australian Jazz & Blues Albums (ARIA)	13

Chart (2016)	Position
Australian Jazz & Blues Albums (ARIA)	10

Chart (2017)	Position
Australian Jazz & Blues Albums (ARIA)	17

Chart (2018)	Position
Australian Jazz & Blues Albums (ARIA)	38

Chart (2019)	Position
Australian Jazz & Blues Albums (ARIA)	41

== Certifications ==
Region	Certification	Certified units/sales
Brazil (Pro-Música Brasil)	Gold	30,000^{*}
Canada (Music Canada)	Platinum	100,000^{^}
Hungary (MAHASZ)	Platinum	6,000^{^}
Poland (ZPAV)	Platinum	20,000^{*}
Portugal (AFP)	Gold	10,000^{^}
United Kingdom (BPI)	Silver	60,000^{‡}
^{*} Sales figures based on certification alone.^{^} Shipments figures based on certification alone.^{‡} Sales+streaming figures based on certification alone.
