= Glad Rag Doll (album) =

Studio album by Diana Krall
- Released: October 2, 2012
- Studios: Avatar (New York, New York); The Village (West Los Angeles)
- Genre: Jazz
- Length: 58:10
- Label: Verve
- Producer: T Bone Burnett

Diana Krall chronology
Quiet Nights (2009)	Glad Rag Doll (2012)	Wallflower (2015)

Glad Rag Doll is the eleventh studio album by Canadian singer Diana Krall, released on October 2, 2012, by Verve Records. Produced by T Bone Burnett, the album covers mainly jazz tunes from the 1920s and 1930s, mostly from Krall's father's collection of 78-rpm records.

== Critical reception ==
Professional ratings
Aggregate scores
Source	Rating
Metacritic	76/100
Review scores
Source	Rating
AllMusic	3.5/5 stars
American Songwriter	4/5 stars
Bass Musician	4.5/5 stars
Christianity Today	4/5 stars
Daily Express	5/5
Entertainment Weekly	B+
Tom Hull	A−
Montreal Gazette	4/5 stars
The New Zealand Herald	3.5/5 stars
PopMatters	8/10

Glad Rag Doll received generally positive reviews from music critics. At Metacritic, which assigns a normalized rating out of 100 to reviews from mainstream publications, the album received an average score of 76, based on 12 reviews.

Peter Goddard of the Toronto Star wrote, "Glad Rag Doll is choc-a-block with utterly unlistenable moments, murky production and heavy-handed playing, notably from drummer Jay Bellerose who approaches everything as if it were a march. This supposedly 'old time' heavy-on-the beat approach totally messes with Krall's singing. What Glad Rag Doll might have sounded like is given away by its four "bonus tracks," each produced by Krall accompanying herself on piano".

Brendon Veevers of Renowned for Sound commented, "Upon first glance of the new record it would appear that Krall has taken a 'sex sells' approach to marketing as we are presented with a scantily clad songbird draped over red velvet in all but some rather revealing black lingerie, however, don't judge a CD by its sleeve as the contents within are anything but sex driven. Although a covers collection Glad Rag Doll reveals itself to be, over a running time of just shy of an hour, a record that could easily be one of Krall's best work to date".

Christopher Loudon of JazzTimes noted, "Though her voice seems to have grown a shade more tenuous since 2009's Quiet Nights, she remains one of the most compelling balladeers around. Indeed, her slightly heightened fragility only adds to the tranquil beauty of 'Prairie Lullaby,' the redemptive ache of 'Let It Rain,' the hollowness of Doc Pomus' brilliantly atmospheric 'Lonely Avenue' (one of two tracks of more recent vintage) and the road-weariness of 'Wide River to Cross' (also newer). And Krall is masterful in her interpretations of the delicately contemplative title track (explored solely with Ribot, who is equally transfixing) and the melodramatic playlet 'Here Lies Love,' with its marvelous faux-dirge propulsion".

== Commercial performance ==
Glad Rag Doll debuted at number six on the Billboard 200, selling 46,000 copies in its first week.

== Track listing ==
No.	Title	Writer(s)	Length
1.	"We Just Couldn't Say Goodbye"	Harry M. Woods	3:07
2.	"There Ain't No Sweet Man That's Worth the Salt of My Tears"	Fred Fisher	4:30
3.	"Just Like a Butterfly That's Caught in the Rain"	Mort Dixon; Woods	3:43
4.	"You Know – I Know Ev'rything's Made for Love"	Al Sherman; Charles Tobias; Howard E. Johnson	3:48
5.	"Glad Rag Doll"	Milton Ager; Dan Dougherty; Jack Yellen	4:35
6.	"I'm a Little Mixed Up"	Betty James; Edward Johnson	4:37
7.	"Prairie Lullaby"	Billy Hill	4:22
8.	"Here Lies Love"	Ralph Rainger; Leo Robin	5:09
9.	"I Used to Love You but It's All Over Now"	Albert Von Tilzer; Lew Brown	2:51
10.	"Let It Rain"	James Kendis; Hal Dyson	5:44
11.	"Lonely Avenue"	Doc Pomus	6:58
12.	"Wide River to Cross"	Julie Miller; Steven P. Miller	3:51
13.	"When the Curtain Comes Down"	Carl Hoefle; Al Lewis; Sherman	4:55
Total length:			58:10

Deluxe edition bonus tracks
No.	Title	Writer(s)	Length
14.	"As Long as I Love"	Milton Drake; George Jessel; Ben Oakland	2:32
15.	"Glad Rag Doll" (alternate version)	Ager; Dougherty; Yellen	2:56
16.	"Garden in the Rain"	James Dyrenforth; Carroll Gibbons	2:57
17.	"There Ain't No Sweet Man That's Worth the Salt of My Tears" (alternate version)	Fisher	2:11
Total length:			68:46

iTunes Store bonus track
No.	Title	Writer(s)	Length
14.	"All I Do Is Dream of You"	Nacio Herb Brown; Arthur Freed	5:28
Total length:			63:38

== Personnel ==
Credits adapted from the liner notes of Glad Rag Doll.

=== Musicians ===
- Diana Krall – vocals (all tracks); piano (tracks 1–4, 6–13)
- Jay Bellerose – drums (tracks 1–4, 6–13)
- Dennis Crouch – bass (tracks 1–4, 6–13)
- Marc Ribot – acoustic guitar (tracks 1, 5–13); electric guitar (tracks 2, 8, 11, 12); ukulele, 6-string bass (track 3); banjo (tracks 8, 11, 13)
- Keefus Ciancia – keyboards (tracks 1–4, 6–12); Mellotron (track 13)
- Colin Linden – Dobro (track 2); electric guitar (track 6)
- Bryan Sutton – electric guitar (track 3); acoustic guitar (tracks 3, 4); baritone guitar (track 12)
- Howard Coward (Note: Howard Coward is a pseudonym for Elvis Costello.) – ukulele (tracks 4, 13); mandola (track 11); tenor guitar (track 12); background vocals (tracks 12, 13)
- T Bone Burnett – electric guitar (track 11)

=== Technical ===
- T Bone Burnett – production
- Mike Piersante – recording, mixing, editing
- Bob Mallory – second engineer
- Vanessa Parr – second engineer
- Zachary Dawes – mixing assistance
- Thomas Perme – equipment technician
- Gavin Lurssen – mastering at Lurssen Mastering, Hollywood, California

=== Artwork ===
- Mark Seliger – photography
- Ruth Levy – production
- Coco Shinomiya – package design
- Edwin Fotheringham – lettering, illustration

== Charts ==
=== Weekly charts ===
Chart (2012)	Peak position
Australian Albums (ARIA)	44
Australian Jazz & Blues Albums (ARIA)	1
Austrian Albums (Ö3 Austria)	8
Belgian Albums (Ultratop Flanders)	10
Belgian Albums (Ultratop Wallonia)	12
Canadian Albums (Billboard)	2
Croatian Albums (HDU)	14
Czech Albums (ČNS IFPI)	9
Danish Albums (Hitlisten)	13
Dutch Albums (Album Top 100)	21
Finnish Albums (Suomen virallinen lista)	48
French Albums (SNEP)	3
German Albums (Offizielle Top 100)	17
Greek Albums (IFPI)	4
Hungarian Albums (MAHASZ)	5
Irish Albums (IRMA)	61
Italian Albums (FIMI)	10
Japanese Albums (Oricon)	32
Mexican Albums (Top 100 Mexico)	34
New Zealand Albums (RMNZ)	19
Norwegian Albums (VG-lista)	21
Polish Albums (ZPAV)	9
Portuguese Albums (AFP)	4
Scottish Albums (Official Charts)	22
Spanish Albums (Promusicae)	10
Swedish Albums (Sverigetopplistan)	23
Swedish Jazz Albums (Sverigetopplistan)	1
Swiss Albums (Schweizer Hitparade)	13
UK Albums (Official Charts)	21
UK Jazz & Blues Albums (Official Charts)	1
US Billboard 200	6
US Top Jazz Albums (Billboard)	1
US Traditional Jazz Albums (Billboard)	1

=== Year-end charts ===
Chart (2012)	Position
Australian Jazz & Blues Albums (ARIA)	5
French Albums (SNEP)	60
Hungarian Albums (MAHASZ)	30
Polish Albums (ZPAV)	91
US Top Jazz Albums (Billboard)	7

Chart (2013)	Position
Australian Jazz & Blues Albums (ARIA)	20
US Top Jazz Albums (Billboard)	3

Chart (2014)	Position
Australian Jazz & Blues Albums (ARIA)	42

== Certifications ==
Region	Certification	Certified units/sales
Canada (Music Canada)	Gold	40,000^{^}
France (SNEP)	Gold	50,000^{*}
Hungary (MAHASZ)	Gold	3,000^{^}
Poland (ZPAV)	Gold	10,000^{*}
^{*} Sales figures based on certification alone.^{^} Shipments figures based on certification alone.
