= Live at the Montreal Jazz Festival =

Video by Diana Krall
- Released: 23 November 2004
- Recorded: 29 June 2004
- Venue: Bell Centre (Montreal, QC)
- Genre: Jazz
- Length: 89 minutes
- Label: Verve
- Producer: Alain N. Simard, Pierre L. Touchette

Diana Krall chronology
Live in Paris (2002)	Live at the Montreal Jazz Festival (2004)	Live in Rio (2009)

Live at the Montreal Jazz Festival is the second DVD by Canadian jazz pianist and vocalist Diana Krall, released on 23 November 2004 via the Verve label. The album was recorded live on 29 June 2004 at Bell Centre, Montreal.

== Track listing ==
1. "Sometimes I Just Freak Out"
2. "All or Nothing at All"
3. "Stop This World"
4. "The Girl in the Other Room"
5. "Abandoned Masquarade"
6. "I'm Coming Through"
7. "Temptation"
8. "East of the Sun (and West of the Moon)"
9. "Devil May Care"
10. "Black Crow"
11. "Narrow Daylight"
12. "Love me Like a Man"
13. "Departure Bay"
