= Lovewell Institute for the Creative Arts =

US non-profit organization

Lovewell Institute for the Creative Arts, also known as Lovewell or Lovewell Institute, is a 501(c)(3) organization that organizes workshops for youth to write and perform an original musical. In 1989, Lovewell was founded by David Sheridan Spangler in Salina, Kansas. In 1993, Lovewell launched an international cultural exchange with Sweden. In 1996, Lovewell sponsored its first bilingual musical, entitled Backstage Story, in Oskarshamn, Sweden. In 2009, Lovewell partnered with United Way of America and the Violence Prevention Office of Broward County to conduct a peace education workshop with high school students in South Florida. The high school students produced the original musical Weight of Words, which addressed students' personal experiences with "parental abuse, harassment due to sexual orientation, nationality, religion or disability, and cyber bullying." In 2011, BankAtlantic sponsored five different schools for 5th graders to perform Weight of Words. In 2015, Boca Raton's "Promise — The Alliance for Youth" nonprofit introduced Weight of Words to four more schools in Palm Beach County.

== Notable alumni ==
Jacob Jeffries, Lead Vocalist and Pianist for the Jacob Jeffries Band and a Member of Vulfpeck

Nathan Tysen, Songwriter and Performer

Kait Kerrigan, Playwright, Musical Theatre Lyricist, and Novelist

Chris Miller, Musical Theater Song Writer and Composer

Keith Center, Lead Singer and Songwriter of The Dreamscapes Project
