= Live in Rio (Diana Krall video) =

Video by Diana Krall
- Released: May 26, 2009; October 27, 2009 (Special Edition)
- Recorded: November 2008
- Venue: Vivo Rio Music Hall (Rio de Janeiro, Brazil)
- Genre: Jazz, bossa nova
- Length: 149 minutes 207 minutes (Special Edition)
- Label: Verve

Diana Krall chronology
Live at the Montreal Jazz Festival (2002)	Live in Rio (2009)

Live in Rio is the third DVD by Canadian jazz pianist and vocalist Diana Krall, released in 2009 (see 2009 in music). It is also available in HD on Blu-ray mastered in DTS-HD 5.1 audio and high resolution stereo. It comes in two versions: the standard edition with performances from Rio and the special edition, which adds a second disk of other performances.

== Track listing ==
=== Standard Edition ===
1. "I Love Being Here With You"
2. "Let's Fall in Love"
3. "Where or When"
4. "Too Marvelous for Words"
5. "I've Grown Accustomed to His Face"
6. "Walk on By"
7. "Frim Fram Sauce"
8. "Cheek to Cheek"
9. "You're My Thrill"
10. "Let's Face the Music and Dance"
11. "Every Time We Say Goodbye"
12. "So Nice"
13. "Quiet Nights"
14. "Este Seu Olhar"
15. "The Boy From Ipanema"
16. "I Don't Know Enough About You"
17. "S'Wonderful"
18. "Exactly Like You"

Conversations

Promotion Film

1. The Boy From Ipanema

=== Special Edition ===
Disc 1

(Same As Standard Edition Disc)

Disc 2

The Toronto Becel Benefit Performance

1. Where Or When
2. Exactly Like You
3. Walk on By
4. Deed I Do
5. Quiet Nights
6. Frim Fram Sauce
7. A Case of You
8. I Don't Know Enough About You

The Madrid Session

1. Deed I Do
2. So Nice
3. PS I Love You

The Lisbon Session

1. Walk on By
2. Este Seu Olhar

The Rio Rooftop Session

1. The Boy From Ipanema
2. Too Marvellous for Words
3. Cheek to Cheek

Promotion Film

1. Quiet Nights

== Charts ==
Chart (2009)	Peak position
Australian Music DVDs Chart	16
Austrian Music DVDs Chart	6
Belgian (Flanders) Music DVDs Chart	8
Belgian (Wallonia) Music DVDs Chart	5
Brazilian Music DVDs Chart	7
Dutch Music DVDs Chart	11
Hungarian Music DVDs Chart	13
New Zealand Music DVDs Chart	7
Swedish Music DVDs Chart	10

== Certifications ==
Region	Certification	Certified units/sales
Canada (Music Canada)	2× Platinum	20,000^{^}
United States (RIAA)	Gold	50,000^{^}
^{^} Shipments figures based on certification alone.
