= Exactly Like You (song) =

1930 song by Jimmy McHugh and Dorothy Fields

"Exactly Like You" is a popular song with music written by Jimmy McHugh and lyrics by Dorothy Fields and published in 1930. The song was introduced by Harry Richman and Gertrude Lawrence in the 1930 Broadway show Lew Leslie's International Revue which also featured McHugh and Fields's "On the Sunny Side of the Street".

== Other versions ==
- Ruth Etting (1930)
- Louis Armstrong (1930)
- Casa Loma Orchestra (1930)
- Roger Wolfe Kahn & His Orchestra with Scrappy Lambert on vocals (1930)
- Count Basie with Jimmy Rushing on vocals
- Django Reinhardt (1937)
- Don Byas with Thelonious Monk (1941)
- Nat King Cole Trio (1949)
- Dizzy Gillespie and Stan Getz – Diz and Getz (1953)
- Erroll Garner (1954)
- Bing Crosby - for his album Bing with a Beat (1957).
- Aretha Franklin
- Red Garland – Manteca (1958)
- Nina Simone (1959)
- Sue Raney - Songs for a Raney Day (1960)
- Sam Cooke - My Kind of Blues (1961)
- Benny Goodman with Lionel Hampton on vocals
- The Masakowski Family, N. O. Escape
- Dave McKenna, Live at Maybeck Recital Hall Volume 2 (1989)
- Willie Nelson
- Frank Sinatra
- Frank Stallone - Frankie & Billy with Billy May Orchestra (2002)
- Regis Philbin - When You're Smiling (2004)
- Diana Krall, From This Moment On (2006)
- Joshua Lee Turner - feat. The Gabe Terracciano Trio (2021)

== See also ==
- List of 1930s jazz standards
