= John Clayton (bassist) =

American jazz bassist (born 1952)

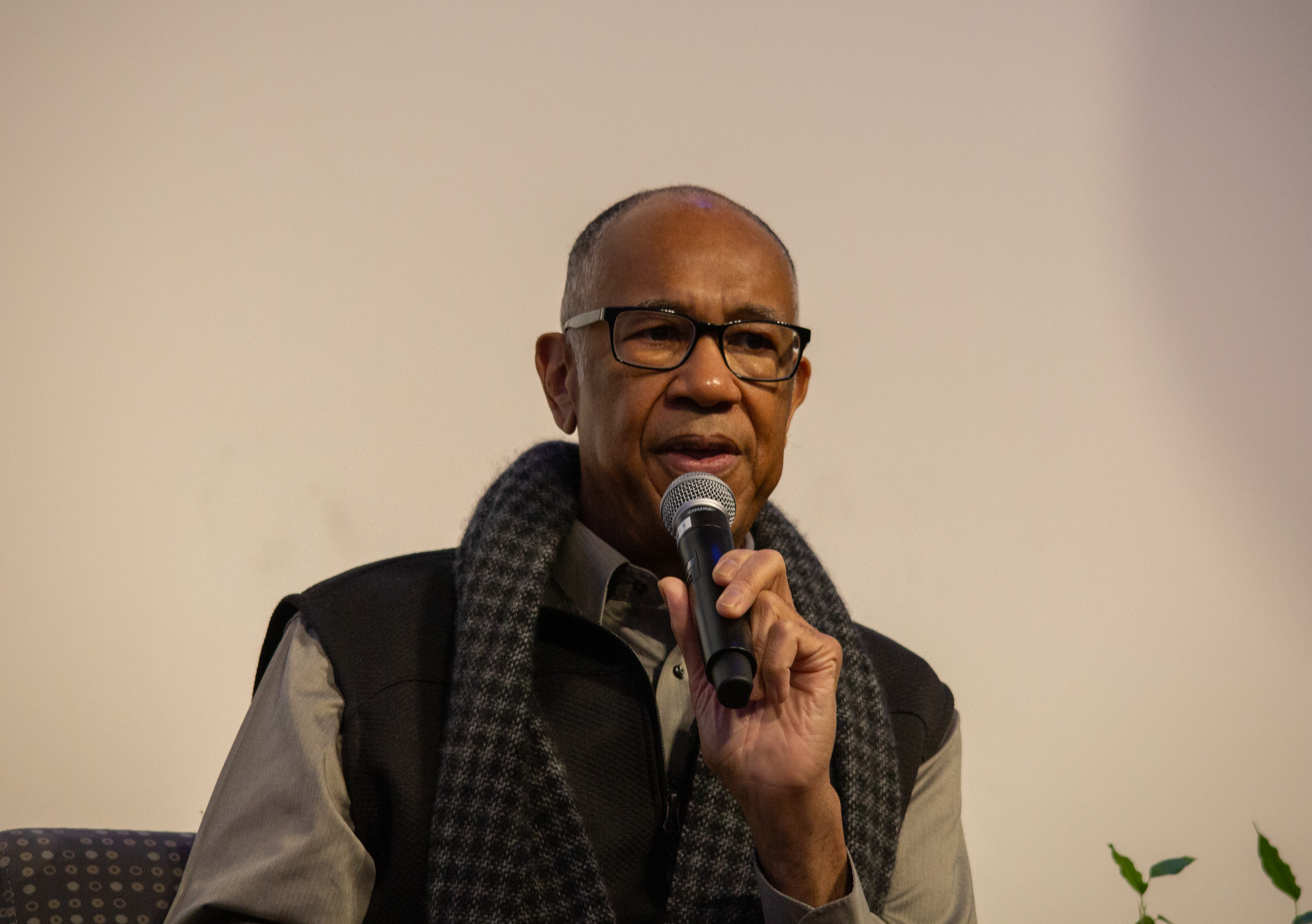
- Clayton in 2024

Background information
- Born: John Lee Clayton Jr. August 20, 1952 (age 74); Venice, California, U.S.
- Genres: Jazz, swing, classical
- Occupations: Musician, arranger, composer
- Instrument: Double bass
- Years active: 1980s–present
- Member of: The Clayton Brothers, Clayton-Hamilton Jazz Orchestra
- Website: johnclaytonjazz.com

John Lee Clayton Jr. (born August 20, 1952) is an American jazz musician, classical double bassist, arranger, and composer.

He is the father of pianist Gerald Clayton and the brother of saxophonist Jeff Clayton, with whom he formed the Clayton Brothers; and the Clayton–Hamilton Jazz Orchestra with Jeff Hamilton.

== Music ==
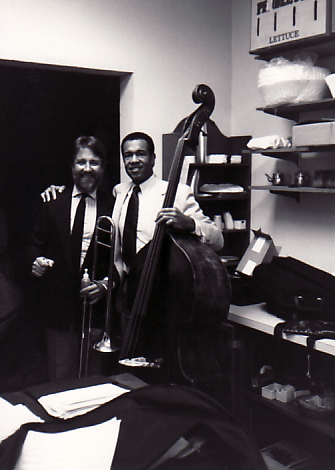
Clayton with trombonist Jiggs Wigham in 1989

Clayton began his bass career in elementary school playing in strings class, junior orchestra, high school jazz band, orchestra, and soul/R&B groups. In 1969, at the age of 16, he enrolled in Ray Brown’s jazz class at UCLA, beginning a close relationship that lasted more than three decades. Three years later, he was bassist on the Henry Mancini's television series The Mancini Generation. In 1975, he graduated from Indiana University School of Music with a degree in bass performance.

He went on to tour with the Monty Alexander Trio and the Count Basie Orchestra, before taking the position of principal bass in the Amsterdam Philharmonic Orchestra in Amsterdam, Netherlands. After five years he returned to the U.S. for a break from the classical genre and, in 1985, co-founded the Clayton-Hamilton Jazz Orchestra with his brother, saxophonist Jeff Clayton, and drummer Jeff Hamilton. He also performed in a duo as the Clayton Brothers with musicians such as Bill Cunliffe and Terell Stafford.

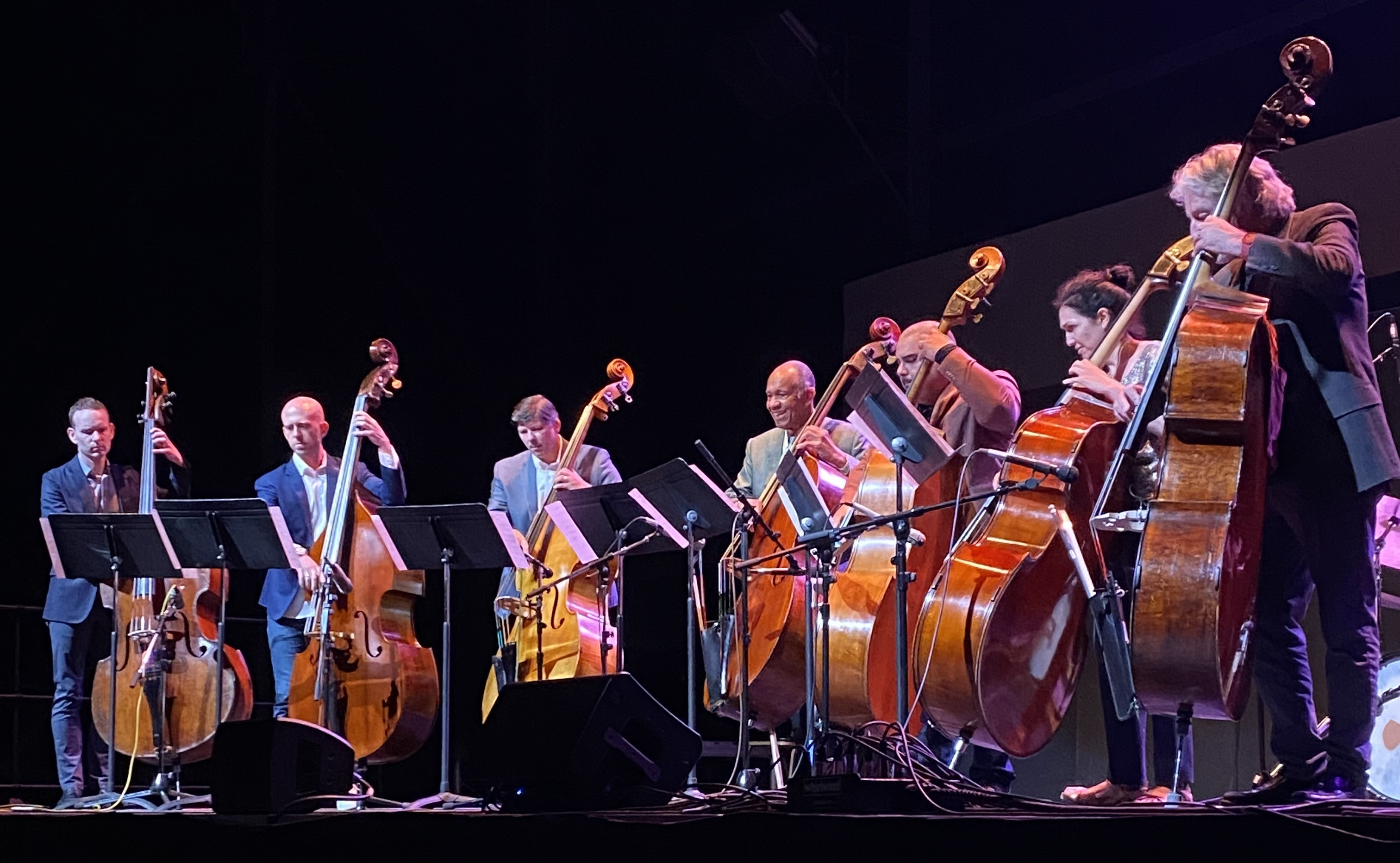
Bass septet performing at Centrum's Jazz Port Townsend festival in tribute to outgoing program director John Clayton, July 27, 2024. From left: Michael Glynn, Matt Brewer, Jon Hamar, John Clayton, Carlos Henriquez, Katie Thiroux, Chris Symer

He has been Artistic Director for the Lionel Hampton Jazz Festival, Sarasota Jazz Festival, Santa Fe Jazz Party, Jazz Port Townsend Summer Workshop from 2004 to 2024, Jazz at Centrum, and Vail Jazz Workshop. From 1999 to 2001, he was the Artistic Director of Jazz for the Los Angeles Philharmonic program at the Hollywood Bowl. He conducted the All-Alaska Jazz Band. He has taught at the University of Southern California Thornton School of Music and has served as president of the International Society of Bassists.

He has composed and arranged for the Count Basie Orchestra, Diana Krall, Whitney Houston, Carmen McRae, Nancy Wilson, Joe Williams, Ernestine Anderson, Quincy Jones, Dee Dee Bridgewater, Natalie Cole, Till Bronner, and the Tonight Show Band.

In 2006, his son Gerald Clayton came in second at the Thelonious Monk International Jazz Piano Competition.

== Awards ==
In 2007, Clayton won a Grammy Award for Instrumental Arrangement Accompanying Vocalist(s) for the song "I'm Gonna Live Till I Die" by Queen Latifah. In December 2009, Brother to Brother by the Clayton Brothers received a Grammy nomination for Best Jazz Instrumental Album, Individual or Group.

== Discography ==
=== As leader or co-leader ===
With the Clayton Brothers

- 1979 The Clayton Brothers - Jeff & John
- 1991 The Music
- 1997 Expressions
- 2000 Siblingity
- 2005 Back in the Swing of Things
- 2008 Brother to Brother
- 2010 The New Song and Dance
- 2012 The Gathering
- 2015 Soul Brothers

With Clayton-Hamilton Jazz Orchestra

- 1990 Groove Shop
- 1991 Heart and Soul
- 1995 Absolutely!
- 1999 Explosive! with Milt Jackson
- 2000 Shout Me Out!
- 2005 Live at MCG
- 2009 Charles Aznavour & the Clayton-Hamilton Jazz Orchestra
- 2011 Sundays in New York with Trijntje Oosterhuis

=== As guest ===
With Monty Alexander

- 1976 Live! Montreux
- 1983 Reunion in Europe
- 1983 The Duke Ellington Songbook
- 1985 The River Monty
- 1986 Li'l Darlin

With Milt Jackson

- 1977 Soul Fusion
- 1993 Reverence and Compassion
- 1988 Bebop
- 1994 The Prophet Speaks

With Diana Krall

- 1993 Stepping Out
- 1999 When I Look in Your Eyes
- 2002 Live in Paris (Diana Krall album)
- 2004 The Girl in the Other Room
- 2005 Christmas Songs
- 2006 From This Moment On
- 2009 Quiet Nights
- 2009 Turn Up the Quiet
- 2020 This Dream of You

With others

- 1978 Live in Japan '78, Count Basie
- 1979 Get Together, Count Basie
- 1982 Indiana, Jeff Hamilton
- 1985 A Gentleman and His Music, Benny Carter
- 1987 Phil Upchurch trio
- 1987 Spontaneous Combustion, Barney Kessel
- 1988 Isn't It Romantic, Michael Feinstein
- 1988 Rockin' L.A., Jimmy Witherspoon
- 1988 Show Tunes, Rosemary Clooney
- 1989 Boogie Down, Ernestine Anderson
- 1989 Live at Town Hall N.Y.C., Gene Harris
- 1989 Sings Rodgers Hart & Hammerstein, Rosemary Clooney
- 1989 The Jiggs Up, Jiggs Whigham
- 1990 Plays the Benny Carter Songbook, Marian McPartland
- 1991 The Star-Spangled Banner, arr. Super Bowl XXV, Whitney Houston
- 1991 Unforgettable... with Love, Natalie Cole
- 1992 In Tribute, Diane Schuur
- 1993 A Single Woman, Nina Simone
- 1993 A Touch of Music in the Night, Michael Crawford
- 1993 Take a Look, Natalie Cole
- 1993 Dream Come True, Arturo Sandoval
- 1994 Self Portrait, Carmen Lundy
- 1994 Super, Ray Brown
- 1995 Afterglow, Dr. John
- 1995 New Gold, Bud Shank
- 1995 Time After Time, Etta James
- 1996 Bud Shank Sextet Plays Harold Arlen, Bud Shank
- 1997 Dear Ella, Dee Dee Bridgewater
- 1997 SuperBass, Ray Brown
- 1997 Blue Moon Swamp, John Fogerty
- 1998 This Christmas, Ann Hampton Callaway
- 1998 Manilow Sings Sinatra, Barry Manilow
- 1998 12 Songs of Christmas, Etta James
- 2004 Renee Olstead, Renee Olstead
- 2005 It's Time, Michael Bublé
- 2006 Before Me, Gladys Knight
- 2006 Dear Mr. Sinatra, John Pizzarelli
- 2006 Easy to Love, Roberta Gambarini
- 2012 Kisses on the Bottom, Paul McCartney
- 2014 Life Journey, Leon Russell
- 2014 The Last Southern Gentlemen, Delfeayo Marsalis
- 2017 I Fall in Love Too Easily, Katharine McPhee
- 2022 Bells On Sand, Gerald Clayton

== See also ==
- List of music arrangers
- List of jazz bassists
