= Jeff Clayton =

American jazz musician (1954–2020)

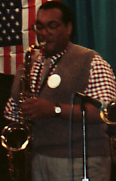
- Clayton in 1989

Background information
- Born: February 16, 1954
- Died: December 16, 2020 (aged 66)
- Genres: Jazz
- Occupation: Musician
- Instruments: Alto saxophone; flute
- Years active: mid-1970s–2020
- Formerly of: The Clayton Brothers; The Clayton–Hamilton Jazz Orchestra; Count Basie Orchestra; Philip Morris Superband

Jeff Clayton (February 16, 1954 – December 16, 2020) was an American jazz alto saxophonist and flautist.

== Career ==
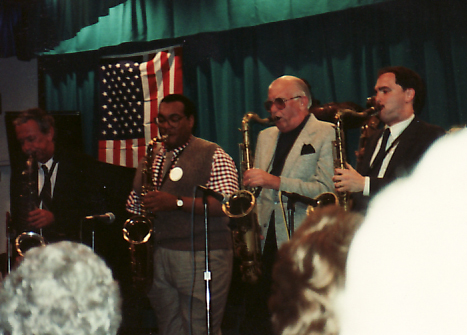
From left: Spike Robinson, Jeff Clayton, Fraser MacPherson, and Ken Peplowski. Performing at Otter Crest, Oregon, in May 1989. Photo courtesy of the Fraser MacPherson estate

Clayton studied oboe at California State University before dropping out to undertake a tour with Stevie Wonder. Following this, he recorded with Gladys Knight, Kenny Rogers, Michael Jackson, Patti LaBelle, and Madonna. With his brother John Clayton he founded The Clayton Brothers, in 1977, and later formed The Clayton–Hamilton Jazz Orchestra with drummer Jeff Hamilton.

He worked with Frank Sinatra, Sammy Davis Jr., Ella Fitzgerald, Woody Herman, Lionel Hampton, Ethan Smith, and Lena Horne, and played in the Count Basie Orchestra while under the leadership of Thad Jones. From 1989 to 1991, he was a member of the Philip Morris Superband. He also toured with Gene Harris, Dianne Reeves, Joe Cocker, B. B. King, and Ray Charles.

Clayton died on December 16, 2020, after suffering from kidney cancer. He was 66 years old.

== Awards and recognition ==
In December 2009, the album Brother to Brother by The Clayton Brothers received a Grammy Award nomination in the Best Jazz Instrumental Album, Individual or Group category.

== Discography ==
With The Clayton–Hamilton Jazz Orchestra

- Boogie-Down (1989), with Ernestine Anderson
- Groove Shop (1989)
- Heart and Soul (1991)
- Absolutely (1995)
- Explosive! (1999), with Milt Jackson
- Christmas Songs (2005), with Diana Krall
- Clayton-Hamilton Jazz Orchestra: Live at MCG (2005)

With The Clayton Brothers

- Music (1991)
- Expressions (1997)
- Siblingity (2000)
- Back in the Swing of Things (2005)

With others

- Kurt Elling, Flirting With Twilight (2001)
