= The Dreamscapes Project =

- Also known as: TDP
- Origin: Reston, Virginia, United States
- Genres: Rock
- Years active: 1997–2014
- Labels: Figmental Records
- Members: Keith Center; Ben Guy; Jeremy Rodgers; Gordon Shankman; Eric Sanford
- Past members: Dave Clark; Ed Bizzell; Donna Griffith
- Website: www.thedreamscapesproject.com

The Dreamscapes Project is a rock band from Reston, Virginia that formed in 1997 and prominently features the cello.

== History ==
1997-2000

The Dreamscapes Project formed in 1997 when Keith Center met Jeremy Rodgers and Ricky Bongos at George Mason University. They eventually formed a group, then later rounded out by drummer Ed Bizzell and violinist Donna Griffith. This line up self-released Focusing the Madness in 1999.

2001-2005

Bizzell and Griffith left the band and were replaced by Dave Clark on drums and Ben Guy on cello. This lineup won the Jaxx Battle of the Bands in 2002. Also in 2002, they released their first live album ...a lot more colors in my world recorded at Jammin' Java in Vienna, VA.

In the following years they competed in the Emergenza Battle of the Bands. In 2004 Keith Center was named the best rhythm guitarist in the Washington, D.C. region, and the band ranked #1 in the Washington region by popular vote. Jeremy Rodgers was named Best bassist in the Washington region in 2005. That year they were the runner-up in the D.C. finals, making them the only band out of the 432 which participated in the DC Region to reach the Emergenza DC finals twice. It was during this period that the band also began to expand outside the DC area and become a more regional act.

In 2005 they hit the studio again and recorded their third album There Are No Safe Words, with Figment Studios and Pure Shift Productions.

2006-2014

In 2006 drummer Dave Clark was replaced by Gordon Shankman and percussionist Eric Sanford. Shortly thereafter, the Dreamscapes Project was voted the highest ranked unsigned original act in DC.

The band brought in producer Ted Comerford and engineers Jeff Juliano and Paul Hager for their album, Pity in a Heartbeat, released in 2007 on Figmental Records. Prior to the album, The Dreamscapes Project released the single, "Still Love" on myspace.com, where the group peaked at #1 in folk rock in the DC area and #2 in acoustic rock in the state of VA. The band also peaked at #13 in folk rock and #53 in acoustic rock nationally on Myspace. Pity in a Heartbeat would prove to be its most commercially successful album, receiving airplay on 150 radio stations across the country. The group also increased its performance schedule and continued to expand into new geographic areas during this time.

In 2009, the band returned to the studio to record a three-song EP. Due to issues with the studio, however, the songs were not released until 2014, under the name E.T.B.T.P.T.

In 2010, the group launched its most ambitious endeavor: The Twelve Days Project. Every month, the band released a new song online in conjunction with a re-imagination of the song by each of the following: another local musician or group, a local visual artist, and a local poet or prose writer. Each month, they would have an official release performance and donate all of the proceeds from that show to a local charity.

In both 2010 and 2011, the Dreamscapes Project was named musician of the year by Northern Virginia Magazine. In 2012, the band joined Third Eye Blind and The Dirty Heads on the bill for the Downtown Countdown in DC. Although, it had slowed its tour schedule by this time, the group peaked at #1 on the reverbnation.com DC charts in each of the following categories: Rock, Folk Rock, Acoustic Rock, Indie, and Alternative in 2012 and 2013.

After taking a couple of hiatuses to focus on family matters, the band played its last show on April 19, 2014. Both Clark and Bizzell were in attendance. The final performance and the penultimate show were recorded and released on the multi-disk set, Fare Well and Good Mourning.

== Band members ==
- Keith Center - lead vocals, 12-string acoustic guitar
- Benjamin Guy - cello, vocals
- Jeremy Rodgers - electric bass
- Gordon Shankman - drums
- Eric Sanford - percussion

== Discography ==
- Focusing the Madness (1999)
- ...A Lot More Colors in My World. (2002)
- There Are No Safe Words (Figmental Records 2005)
- Pity in a Heartbeat (Figmental Records 2007)
- The Twelve Days Project (Figmental Records 2010)
- et bt pt (2014)
- Fare Well and Good Mourning (2014)
