= Live in Paris (Diana Krall album) =

2002 live album by Diana Krall

Live album by Diana Krall
- Released: October 1, 2002
- Recorded: November 29 – December 2, 2001 (Note: Tracks 1–11)
- Venue: Olympia (Paris)
- Studio: Avatar (New York City) (Note: Track 12)
- Genre: Jazz
- Length: 70:02
- Label: Verve
- Producer: Tommy LiPuma

Diana Krall chronology
The Look of Love (2001)	Live in Paris (2002)	The Girl in the Other Room (2004)

Live in Paris

Video by Diana Krall
- Released: April 2, 2002
- Venue: Olympia (Paris)
- Genre: Jazz
- Length: 130 minutes
- Label: Eagle Eye Media

Diana Krall chronology
Live in Paris (2002)	Live at the Montreal Jazz Festival (2004)

Live in Paris is the first live album and video album by Canadian singer Diana Krall, released on October 1, 2002, by Verve Records. The album was recorded during Krall's sold-out concerts at Paris's Olympia from November 29 to December 2, 2001, and includes songs from her albums Only Trust Your Heart (1995), All for You: A Dedication to the Nat King Cole Trio (1996), When I Look in Your Eyes (1999), and The Look of Love (2001).

In the United States alone, the album has sold over 500,000 copies while the video has sold over 200,000 copies. The album won the 2003 Grammy Award for Best Jazz Vocal Album and the 2003 Juno Award for Vocal Jazz Album of the Year. Billboard ranked the album at number eight on the magazine's Top Jazz Albums of the Decade.

The CD album was released in the United Kingdom under the title A Night in Paris with a different cover art; the track listing omits the track "Maybe You'll Be There", while including the bonus track "Charmed Life" and the music video for "The Look of Love".

== Critical reception ==
Professional ratings
Review scores
Source	Rating
The Absolute Sound	4/5 stars
AllMusic	4/5 stars
Robert Christgau	(dud)
The Penguin Guide to Jazz Recordings	3.5/4 stars

Christopher Loudon of JazzTimes wrote, "I'm guessing that producer Tommy LiPuma, sage pulse-taker that he is, recognized it was high time for Krall to get back to basics. If so, 10 points for Tommy. Apart from the presence, on two of the album's 11 tracks, of the syrupy but subdued Orchestre Symphonique Europeen, Live in Paris features the British Columbia beauty stripped bare, passion fully exposed, intensity cranked to 11. Raw, unplugged, pure. Krall 101".

Nail Gader of The Absolute Sound stated, "Surfaces are dead quiet, and the LP is lighter on its feet, more layered, airier, finer grained, and more transparent. Live in Paris is a great addition to a choice LP collection".

Jeff Cebulski of Paste commented, "In the meantime, Krall croons blue notes heretofore reserved for Cassandra Wilson (in Joni Mitchell's 'A Case of You'), whispers wispy ballads, and even scats a bit—a welcome return to her early form, before market-driven pressures took over".

== Track listing ==
=== CD ===
No.	Title	Writer(s)	Length
1.	"I Love Being Here with You"	Peggy Lee; William Schluger	5:12
2.	"Let's Fall in Love"	Harold Arlen; Ted Koehler	4:34
3.	"'Deed I Do"	Walter Hirsch; Fred Rose	5:18
4.	"The Look of Love"	Burt Bacharach; Hal David	5:00
5.	"East of the Sun (and West of the Moon)"	Brooks Bowman	5:58
6.	"I've Got You Under My Skin"	Cole Porter	7:24
7.	"Devil May Care"	Bob Dorough; Terrell Kirk	6:52
8.	"Maybe You'll Be There"	Rube Bloom; Sammy Gallop	5:48
9.	"'S Wonderful"	George Gershwin; Ira Gershwin	6:00
10.	"Fly Me to the Moon"	Bart Howard	6:06
11.	"A Case of You"	Joni Mitchell	6:50
12.	"Just the Way You Are"	Billy Joel	5:00
Total length:			70:02

Canadian exclusive track
No.	Title	Writer(s)	Length
13.	"Charmed Life"	Diana Krall	2:48
Total length:			72:50

=== DVD and Blu-ray ===
No.	Title	Writer(s)	Length
1.	"I Love Being Here with You"	Lee; Schluger
2.	"All or Nothing at All"	Arthur Altman; Jack Lawrence
3.	"Let's Fall in Love"	Arlen; Koehler
4.	"The Look of Love"	Bacharach; David
5.	"Maybe You'll Be There"	Bloom; Gallop
6.	"'Deed I Do"	Hirsch; Rose
7.	"Devil May Care"	Dorough; Kirk
8.	"Cry Me a River"	Arthur Hamilton
9.	"I've Got You Under My Skin"	Porter
10.	"East of the Sun (and West of the Moon)"	Bowman
11.	"I Get Along Without You Very Well"	Hoagy Carmichael
12.	"Pick Yourself Up"	Jerome Kern; Dorothy Fields
13.	"'S Wonderful"	G. Gershwin; I. Gershwin
14.	"Love Letters"	Victor Young; Edward Heyman
15.	"I Don't Know Enough About You"	Lee; Dave Barbour
16.	"Do It Again"	G. Gershwin; Buddy DeSylva
17.	"A Case of You"	Mitchell

== Personnel ==
Credits adapted from the liner notes of the Canadian edition of Live in Paris.

=== Musicians ===
- Diana Krall – vocals, piano (all tracks); Fender Rhodes (track 12)
- Anthony Wilson – guitar (tracks 1–10, 12)
- John Clayton – bass (tracks 1–10, 13)
- Jeff Hamilton – drums (tracks 1–10, 13)
- Alan Broadbent – music direction, conducting (tracks 2, 6)
- Orchestre Symphonique Européen – orchestra (tracks 2, 6)
- John Pisano – acoustic guitar (tracks 4, 6, 9)
- Paulinho da Costa – percussion (tracks 4, 6, 7, 9)
- Michael Brecker – tenor saxophone solo (track 12)
- Rob Mounsey – additional keyboards (track 12)
- Christian McBride – bass (track 12)
- Lewis Nash – drums (track 12)
- Luis Quintero – percussion (track 12)
- Ron Escheté – guitar (track 13)

=== Technical ===
- Tommy LiPuma – production
- Al Schmitt – recording, mixing
- Steve Genewick – engineering assistance
- Bill Smith – Pro Tools engineering
- Aya Takemura – second engineer (track 12)
- Brian Montgomery – second engineer (track 12)
- Andy Sarroff – mix engineering (track 12)
- Jill Dell'Abate – production coordination (track 12)
- Doug Sax – mastering
- Robert Hadley – mastering

=== Artwork ===
- Hollis King – art direction
- Paul Lombardi – design
- Rika Ichiki – design
- Donna Ranieri – photography production
- Bruce Weber – cover photography
- Steve Lewis – back cover photography
- Peter Rad – inside booklet and tray photography

== Charts ==
=== Weekly charts ===
2002 weekly chart performance for Live in Paris (album)
Chart (2002)	Peak position
Australian Albums (ARIA)	41
Australian Jazz & Blues Albums (ARIA)	2
Austrian Albums (Ö3 Austria)	19
Belgian Albums (Ultratop Flanders)	39
Belgian Albums (Ultratop Wallonia)	20
Canadian Albums (Billboard)	3
Dutch Albums (Album Top 100)	66
European Albums (Music & Media)	23
French Albums (SNEP)	23
German Albums (Offizielle Top 100)	53
Italian Albums (FIMI)	24
Japanese Albums (Oricon)	83
New Zealand Albums (RMNZ)	6
Norwegian Albums (VG-lista)	5
Polish Albums (ZPAV)	30
Portuguese Albums (AFP)	26
Scottish Albums (Official Charts)	49
Swedish Albums (Sverigetopplistan)	15
Swedish Jazz Albums (Sverigetopplistan)	1
Swiss Albums (Schweizer Hitparade)	30
UK Albums (Official Charts)	30
UK Jazz & Blues Albums (Official Charts)	2
US Billboard 200	18
US Top Jazz Albums (Billboard)	2
US Traditional Jazz Albums (Billboard)	1

2025 weekly chart performance for Live in Paris (album)
Chart (2025)	Peak position
French Classical Albums (SNEP)	43

Weekly chart performance for Live in Paris (video)
Chart (2002)	Peak position
US Music Video Sales (Billboard)	1

=== Year-end charts ===
2002 year-end chart performance for Live in Paris (album)
Chart (2002)	Position
Australian Jazz & Blues Albums (ARIA)	6
Canadian Albums (Nielsen SoundScan)	22
Canadian Jazz Albums (Nielsen SoundScan)	3
French Albums (SNEP)	125
US Top Jazz Albums (Billboard)	3

2003 year-end chart performance for Live in Paris (album)
Chart (2003)	Position
Australian Jazz & Blues Albums (ARIA)	4
US Top Jazz Albums (Billboard)	2

2004 year-end chart performance for Live in Paris (album)
Chart (2004)	Position
US Top Jazz Albums (Billboard)	4

== Certifications ==
Certifications for Live in Paris (album)
Region	Certification	Certified units/sales
Argentina (CAPIF)	Gold	20,000^{^}
Australia (ARIA)	Gold	35,000^{^}
Austria (IFPI Austria)	Gold	15,000^{*}
Brazil (Pro-Música Brasil)	Gold	50,000^{*}
Canada (Music Canada)	2× Platinum	200,000^{^}
Poland (ZPAV)	Gold	20,000^{*}
United Kingdom (BPI)	Gold	100,000^{^}
United States (RIAA)	Gold	500,000^{^}
^{*} Sales figures based on certification alone.^{^} Shipments figures based on certification alone.

Certifications for Live in Paris (video)
Region	Certification	Certified units/sales
Australia (ARIA)	Platinum	15,000^{^}
Canada (Music Canada)	6× Platinum	60,000^{^}
United States (RIAA)	2× Platinum	200,000^{^}
^{^} Shipments figures based on certification alone.
