= The Clayton–Hamilton Jazz Orchestra =

American big band

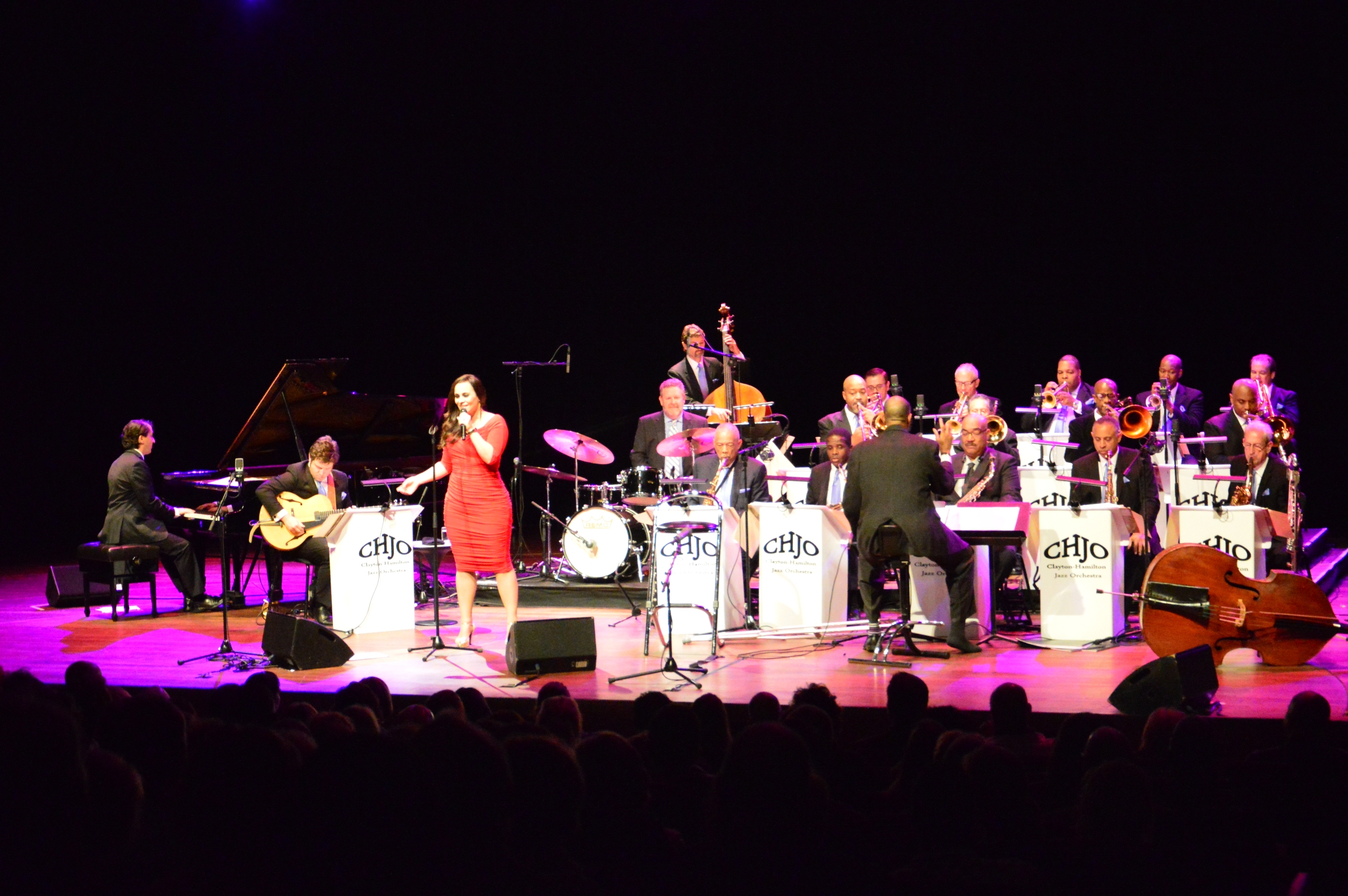
- CHJO performing in Rotterdam, Netherlands

Background information
- Origin: Los Angeles, California, U.S.
- Genres: Jazz; big band
- Years active: 1985–present
- Labels: Capri; Lake Street; Qwest; Fable/Lighyear; MCG; EMI; Blue Note
- Members: John Clayton; Jeff Hamilton; Oscar Brashear; Bill Cunliffe; Gerald Clayton; George Bohanon; Rickey Woodard; Tamir Hendelman; Kye Palmer; Lee Callet; Bijon Watson; Clay Jenkins; Charles Owens; Bill Green; Jim Hershman; Gilbert Castellanos; Ryan Porter; Keith Fiddmont; Ira Nepus; Maurice Spears; Sal Cracchiolo; Jon Hamar
- Past members: Jeff Clayton; Bobby Bryant; Thurman Green; Snooky Young; Randy Napoleon
- Website: www.johnclaytonjazz.com/chjo/

The Clayton–Hamilton Jazz Orchestra (CHJO) is a big band led by Jeff Hamilton, John Clayton, and formerly his brother, Jeff Clayton. The band was founded in Los Angeles in 1985.

== Personnel ==
On the album The L.A. Treasures Project (Capri, 2014):

- John Clayton – arco bass
- Jeff Clayton – alto saxophone
- Jeff Hamilton – drums
- Bijon Watson – trumpet
- Gilbert Castellanos – trumpet
- James Ford – trumpet
- Brian Swartz – trumpet
- Jamie Hovorka – trumpet
- Ira Nepus – trombone
- George Bohanon – trombone
- Ryan Porter – trombone
- Maurice Spears – trombone
- Keith Fiddmont – alto saxophone
- Rickey Woodard – tenor saxophone
- Charles Owens – tenor saxophone
- Lee Callet – baritone saxophone
- Tamir Hendelman – piano
- Graham Dechter – guitar
- Chris Lutti – bass
- Ernie Andrews – vocals
- Barbara Morrison – vocals

== Discography ==
- Groove Shop (Capri, 1990)
- Heart and Soul (Capri, 1991)
- Absolutely! (Lake Street, 1995)
- Explosive! – Milt Jackson featuring the CHJO (Qwest/Warner Bros., 1999)
- Shout Me Out! (Fable/Lightyear, 2000)
- Live at MCG (MCG, 2005)
- Christmas Songs – Diana Krall featuring the CHJO (Verve, 2005)
- Dear Mr. Sinatra – John Pizzarelli featuring the CHJO (Telarc, 2006; recorded 2005)
- Call Me Irresponsible – Michael Bublé album, song: "The Best Is Yet to Come" (143 Records/Warner Bros., 2007)
- Charles Aznavour & The Clayton-Hamilton Jazz Orchestra (EMI, 2009)
- Sundays in New York – Trijntje Oosterhuis featuring the CHJO (Blue Note, 2011)
- The L.A. Treasures Project (Capri, 2014)
- Life Journey – Leon Russell album, songs: "Georgia On My Mind", "I Got It Bad (and That Ain't Good)", and "New York State of Mind" (Universal, 2014)
- And So It Goes (R.M.I. Records, 2023)
