= Rickey Woodard =

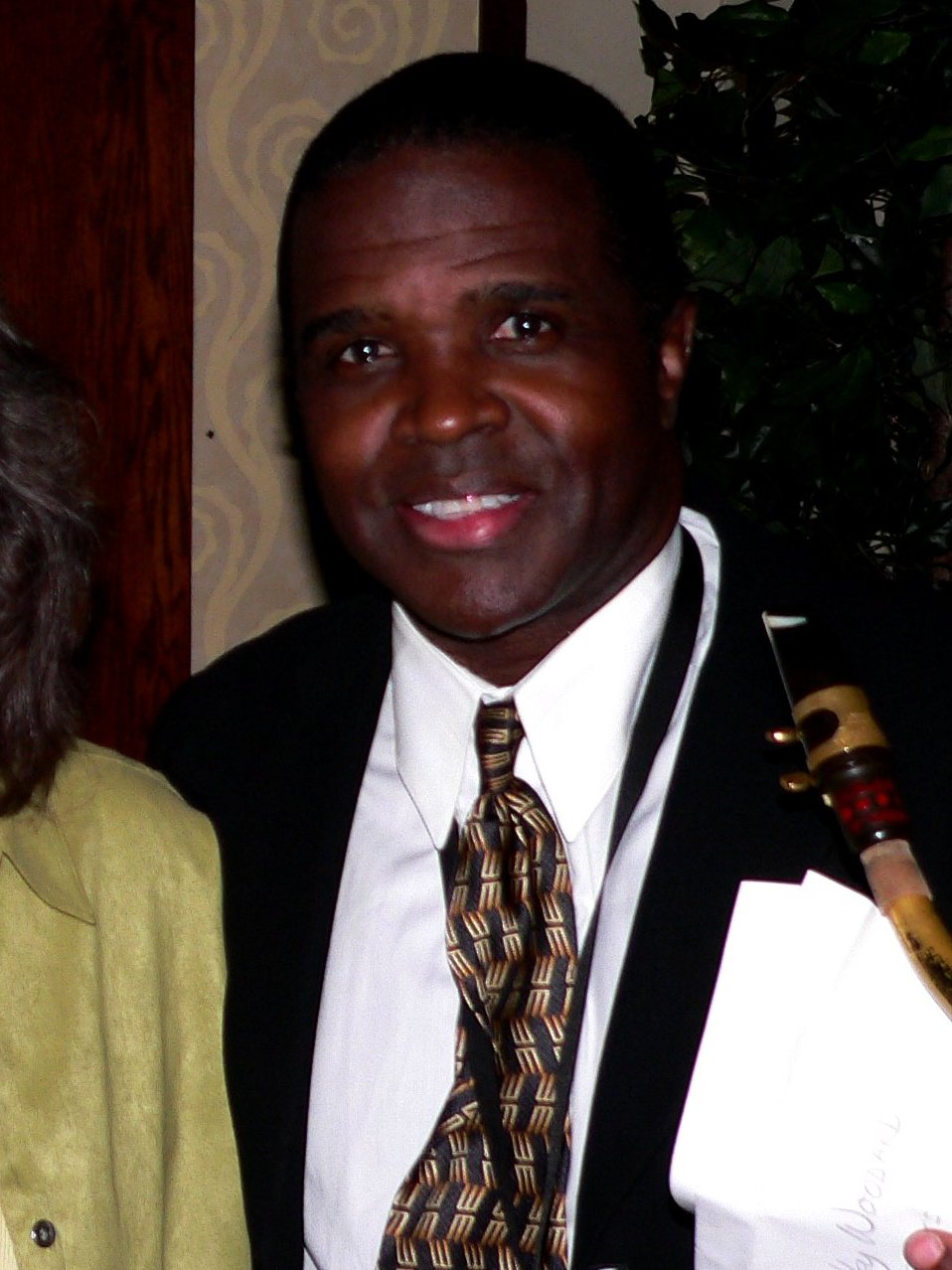

Background information
- Genres: jazz
- Instrument: saxophone
- Formerly of: Ray Charles band; Clayton-Hamilton Jazz Orchestra; Sweet Baby Blues Band

Rickey Woodard (born August 5, 1950) is an American jazz saxophonist.

Born in Nashville, Tennessee, from 1980 onwards Woodard spent seven years with the Ray Charles band.

A member of the Clayton-Hamilton Jazz Orchestra, Woodard has also recorded with Frank Capp and as a member of Jeannie and Jimmy Cheatham's Sweet Baby Blues Band.

In 1993, he embarked on a series of yearly visits to the Peterborough Jazz Club in England, billed with veteran British jazz musicians such as Dick Morrissey, John Burch, and Tony Archer.

== Discography ==
As leader/co-leader

- 1991: The Frank Capp Trio Presents Rickey Woodard (Concord 4469)
- 1991: California Cooking! (Candid 79509)
- 1991: Night Mist (Fresh Sound 190) – with Eric Reed, Tony Dumas, and Roy McCurdy
- 1992: The Tokyo Express (Candid 79527) – with James Williams, Christian McBride, and Joe Chambers
- 1994: Yazoo (Concord 4629) – with Cedar Walton, Jeff Littleton, Ralph Penland, and Ray Brown (trumpet)
- 1995: Quality Time: Frank Capp Quartet Featuring Rickey Woodard (Concord 4677)
- 1996: The Silver Strut (Concord 4716)
- 1997: The Tenor Trio (JMI/JVC 7501) – with Ernie Watts, Pete Christlieb, Gerry Wiggins, Chuck Berghofer, and Frank Capp
- 2001: California Cooking #2 (Candid 79762)
- 2004: Picture This (Rickey Woodard Music 634479089459)
- 2009: Why Did I Do It (Rickey Woodard Music 884502065787)
- 2009: Pineapple Delight (Rickey Woodard Music 884502252552)

As a member of The Clayton-Hamilton Jazz Orchestra

- 1989: Groove Shop – Clayton-Hamilton Jazz Orchestra (Capri)
- 1990: Boogie Down – Ernestine Anderson with The Clayton-Hamilton Jazz Orchestra (Concord)
- 1991: Heart And Soul – Clayton-Hamilton Jazz Orchestra (Capri)
- 1994: Absolutely! – Clayton-Hamilton Jazz Orchestra (Lake Street)
- 1999: Explosive! – Milt Jackson Meets The Clayton-Hamilton Jazz Orchestra (Qwest/WB)
- 2000: Shout Me Out! – Clayton-Hamilton Jazz Orchestra (Fable/Lightyear/WEA)
- 2004: Live At MCG – Clayton-Hamilton Jazz Orchestra (MCG Jazz)
- 2005: Christmas Songs – Diana Krall featuring The Clayton-Hamilton Jazz Orchestra (Verve)
- 2006: Dear Mr. Sinatra – John Pizzarelli with The Clayton-Hamilton Jazz Orchestra (Telarc)
- 2009: Charles Aznavour & The Clayton-Hamilton Jazz Orchestra (Capitol Jazz/EMI)
- 2011: Sundays In New York – Trijntje Oosterhuis with The Clayton-Hamilton Jazz Orchestra (Blue Note/EMI)
- 2014: The L.A. Treasures Project: Live At Alvas Showroom – Clayton-Hamilton Jazz Orchestra (Capri) – with guests: Ernie Andrews, Barbara Morrison

As sideman

- 1991: Rockin' With Rachmaninoff – Horace Silver (Bop City [rel. 2003])
- 1991: Basket Full Of Blues – Jeannie & Jimmy Cheatham And The Sweet Baby Blues Band (Concord)
- 1993: Blues And The Boogie Masters – Jeannie & Jimmy Cheatham And The Sweet Baby Blues Band (Concord)
- 1994: Timepiece – Kenny Rogers (143/Atlantic)
- 1994: Pencil Packin' Papa – Horace Silver (Columbia)
- 1994: Seven Sensational Saxophones – Fujitsu-Concord 26th Jazz Festival (Concord) – with Jesse Davis, Gary Foster, Ken Peplowski, Chris Potter, Bill Ramsay, Frank Wess, and Rickey Woodard
- 1995: In A Hefti Bag – Frank Capp Juggernaut Band (Concord)
- 1995: Gud Nuz Bluz – Jeannie & Jimmy Cheatham And The Sweet Baby Blues Band (Concord)
- 1996: Shaking Free – Nnenna Freelon (Concord)
- 1996: Play It Again Sam – Frank Capp Juggernaut Band (Concord)
- 1996: Lefty Leaps In – John Leitham (USA Music Group) – with Pete Christlieb, Tom Ranier, and Roy McCurdy
- 1997: Live! – John Leitham (C.A.R.S.) – with Pete Christlieb, Shelly Berg, and Joe LaBarbera
