= Political drama =

Play, film or TV program that has a political component

A political drama can describe a play, film or TV program that has a political component, whether reflecting the author's political opinion, or describing a politician or series of political events.

Dramatists who have written political dramas include Aaron Sorkin, Robert Penn Warren, Sergei Eisenstein, Bertolt Brecht, Jean-Paul Sartre, Howard Brenton, Caryl Churchill, and Federico García Lorca.

== Theatre ==
In the history of theatre, there is long tradition of performances addressing issues of current events, especially those central to society itself. The political satire performed by the comic poets at the theatres had considerable influence on public opinion in the Athenian democracy. Those earlier Western dramas, arising out of the polis, or democratic city-state of Greek society, were performed in amphitheaters, central arenas used for theatrical performances, religious ceremonies and political gatherings; these dramas had a ritualistic and social significance that enhanced the relevance of the political issues being examined.

Shakespeare is an author of political theatre according to some academic scholars, who observe that his history plays examine the machinations of personal drives and passions determining political activity and that many of the tragedies such as King Lear and Macbeth dramatize political leadership and complexity subterfuges of human beings driven by the lust for power. For example, they observe that class struggle in the Roman Republic is central to Coriolanus.

Historically in Soviet Russia, the term political theatre was sometimes referred to as agitprop theatre or simply agitprop, after the Soviet term agitprop.

=== Recent political drama ===
In later centuries, political theatre has sometimes taken a different form. Sometimes associated with cabaret and folk theatre, it has offered itself as a theatre 'of, by, and for the people'. In this guise, political theatre has developed within the civil societies under oppressive governments as a means of actual underground communication and the spreading of critical thought. Following the war there was an influx of political theatre, as people needed to discuss the losses of the war.

Often political theatre has been used to promote specific political theories or ideals, for example in the way agitprop theatre has been used to further Marxism and the development of communist sympathies. Russian agitprop theater was noted for its cardboard characters of perfect virtue and complete evil, and its coarse ridicule.

=== Realism in theatre ===
Less radical versions of political theatre have become established within the mainstream modern repertory - such as the realist dramas of Arthur Miller (The Crucible and All My Sons), which probe the behavior of human beings as social and political animals.

=== Feminist theatre ===
A new form of political theatre emerged in the twentieth century with feminist authors like Elfriede Jelinek or Caryl Churchill, who often make use of the non-realistic techniques detailed above.. During the 1960s and 1970s, new theatres emerged addressing women's issues. These theatres went beyond producing feminist plays, but also sought to give women opportunities and work experience in all areas of theatrical production which had heretofore been dominated by men. In addition to playwright, producers, and actors, there were opportunities for women electricians, set designers, musical director, stage managers, etc.

=== Brechtian theatre ===
The Living Theatre, created by Judith Malina and her husband Julian Beck in 1947, which had its heyday in the 1960s, during the Vietnam War, is a primary example of politically oriented Brechtian performance art in the United States. Their original productions of Kenneth Brown's The Brig (c. 1964), also filmed, and of Jack Gelber's controversial play The Connection and its 1961 film rely upon and illustrate the dramaturgy of Brechtian alienation effect (Verfremdungseffekt) that most political theatre uses to some extent, forcing the audience to take a "critical perspective" on events being dramatized or projected on screen(s) and building on aspects of the Theatre of Cruelty, which developed from the theory and practice of French early surrealist and proto-absurdist Antonin Artaud.

=== American regional theatre ===
In American regional theatre, a politically oriented social orientation occurs in Street theatre, such as that produced by the San Francisco Mime Troupe and ROiL. The Detroit Repertory Theatre has been among those regional theaters at the forefront of political comedy, staging plays like Jacob M. Appel's Arborophilia, in which a lifelong Democrat prefers that her daughter fall in love with a poplar tree instead of a Republican activist. In 2014, Chicago's Annoyance Theater produced Good Morning Gitmo: a one-act play by Mishu Hilmy and Eric Simon which lampoons the US Detention Center at Guantanamo Bay.

David Hare's play Straight Line Crazy focuses on the life of Robert Moses, played by Ralph Fiennes, the controversial urban planner who worked in New York.

=== English political theatre ===
Kitchen sink realism or kitchen sink drama was a movement that developed in the late 1950s and early 1960s in theatre, art, novels, film, and television plays, whose protagonists usually could be described as "angry young men" who were disillusioned with modern society. It used a style of social realism to depict the lives of working class Britons, and to explore controversial social and political issues ranging from abortion to homelessness. The film It Always Rains on Sunday (1947) is a precursor of the genre, and John Osborne's play Look Back in Anger (1956) is an example of an early play in this genre.

The Iraq War is the focus of some recent British political drama; for example, Stuff Happens, by David Hare. David Edgar and Mark Ravenhill also satirize contemporary socio-political realities in their recent dramatic works.

Banner Theatre in Birmingham, England, in the United Kingdom, is an example of a specific kind of political theatre called documentary theatre.

=== Scottish political theatre ===
John McGrath, founder of the Scottish popular theatre company 7:84, argued that "the theatre can never 'cause' a social change. It can articulate pressure towards one, help people celebrate their strengths and maybe build their self-confidence… Above all, it can be the way people find their voice, their solidarity and their collective determination."

== Television ==
The television series The West Wing created by Aaron Sorkin which focuses on the fictional Democratic administration of President Josiah Bartlet is widely considered one of the greatest TV shows of all time, having won three Golden Globe Awards and 26 Primetime Emmy Awards, including the award for Outstanding Drama Series, which it won four consecutive times from 2000 to 2003.

Yes, Minister and its sequel Yes, Prime Minister were British political satire sitcoms.

Other television series that have been classified as political dramas include Borgen, Boss, Jack & Bobby, The Bold Ones: The Senator, Commander in Chief, House of Cards (British and American versions), Madam Secretary, Designated Survivor, Spin, Ingobernable, Scandal, Billions, The Looming Tower, and The Mechanism.

The Good Wife can also be considered a political drama, especially in its critically acclaimed second season and fifth season. Races for political office, including state's attorney, governor, and even a Presidential run, move in and out of the show's narrative and the story of its main character, Alicia Florrick. However, Alicia's primary profession as a litigator for the most part takes precedence in the narrative, and so the show more often focuses on her cases and related office politics, making it primarily a legal drama.

== Film ==
There have been notable films that have been labeled as political dramas such as Thirteen Days and The Ides of March. A famous literary political drama which later made the transition to film was Robert Penn Warren's All the King's Men.

== See also ==
- Howard Brenton
- Dario Fo
- Jean Genet
- Jerzy Grotowski (Art as Vehicle)
- Harold Pinter
- Erwin Piscator
- Political thriller
- Political cinema
- Proletarian literature
- Theatre state
- Social criticism
- Teatro Campesino
