= Signals Through the Flames =

Signals Through the Flames is a 1983 documentary film on the work of Julian Beck and Judith Malina as the founders of The Living Theatre performance company. The title of the film is taken from the work of Antonin Artaud in his book on theatre theory called The Theatre and its Double. The film was produced by Mystic Fire Video as a project of the now defunct Mystic Fire Video bookstore in New York City. It was directed and edited by Sheldon Rochlin.

Signals Through the Flames contains first person interviews with Beck and Malina and archival footage of performances and street actions from various news reporting sources of the theater's political life in the late 1960s. Particular attention is given to Paris in 1968 in a performance called Paradise Now and the occupation of the Odeon Theatre. Excerpts from the filmed productions of The Brig by Kenneth H. Brown directed by Jonas Mekas and of Jack Gelber's play The Connection directed by Shirley Clarke are also part of the documentary.

The film documents significant history in the performing arts community. Academic and performing arts institutions such as the Segal Theatre Center and the Yale School of Drama continue to offer free public screenings of the film more than three decades later. The archives of The Living Theatre, including this film, were acquired by the Yale School of Drama.
