= Shades of Redd =

Studio album by Freddie Redd
- Released: Early May 1961
- Recorded: August 13, 1960
- Studio: Van Gelder Studio, Englewood Cliffs
- Genre: Jazz
- Length: 40:12 original LP
- Label: Blue Note; BST 84045
- Producer: Alfred Lion

Freddie Redd chronology
Music from the Connection (1960)	Shades of Redd (1961)	Redd's Blues (1961)

Shades of Redd is an album by American pianist Freddie Redd recorded in 1960 and released on the Blue Note label.

== Reception ==
Professional ratings
Review scores
Source	Rating
Allmusic	5/5 stars

The Allmusic review by Michael G. Nastos stated: "In an all too small discography, Freddie Redd's Shades of Redd is without a doubt his crowning achievement... his zenith as a jazz musician, would be a wonderful addition to any collection, and shows that the lesser known musicians have plenty of music to play, in addition to a unique perspective aside from the giants of this music".

== Track listing ==
All compositions by Freddie Redd

1. "The Thespian" - 7:00
2. "Blues, Blues, Blues" - 6:00
3. "Shadows" - 7:24
4. "Melanie" - 5:06
5. "Swift" - 4:02
6. "Just a Ballad for My Baby" - 4:14
7. "Olé" - 6:26
8. "Melanie" [alternate take] - 5:28 Bonus track on CD reissue
9. "Olé" [alternate take] - 7:37 Bonus track on CD reissue

== Personnel ==
- Freddie Redd - piano
- Jackie McLean - alto saxophone
- Tina Brooks - tenor saxophone
- Paul Chambers - bass
- Louis Hayes - drums
