= Live at the Studio Grill =

Live album by Freddie Redd
- Released: 1990
- Recorded: May 19 & 26, 1988
- Venue: Studio Grill, Hollywood, CA
- Genre: Jazz
- Length: 52:43
- Label: Triloka; 182-2
- Producer: Paul A. Sloman

Freddie Redd chronology
Lonely City (1989)	Live at the Studio Grill (1990)	Everybody Loves a Winner (1991)

Live at the Studio Grill is a live album by jazz pianist Freddie Redd recorded in Hollywood in 1988 and released on the Triloka label in 1990.

== Reception ==
Professional ratings
Review scores
Source	Rating
Allmusic	4.5/5 stars

The Allmusic review by Scott Yanow states: "Due to his timeless style and relatively few recordings, Freddie Redd is a legend. A fine bop pianist who was an associate of his idols Bud Powell and Thelonious Monk, Redd (62 at the time of this set) will probably always be best-known for his work on the play The Connection. Although maintaining a low profile, Redd had been playing continuously through the decades ... Redd is an unrecognized giant. Bassist Al McKibbon and drummer Billy Higgins offer short solos and sympathetic support on this highly recommended trio set".

== Track listing ==
All compositions by Freddie Redd, except where indicated

1. "I'm Gonna Be Happy" – 7:09
2. "I'll Remember April" (Gene de Paul, Patricia Johnston, Don Raye) – 8:09
3. "I'll Keep Loving You" (Bud Powell) – 4:37
4. "Don't Lose the Blues" – 5:53
5. "'Round Midnight" (Thelonious Monk, Cootie Williams, Bernie Hanighen) – 6:28
6. "Waltzin' In" – 6:53
7. "For Heaven's Sake" (Elise Bretton, Sherman Edwards, Donald Meyer) – 4:10
8. "All the Things You Are" (Jerome Kern, Oscar Hammerstein II) – 9:24

== Personnel ==
- Freddie Redd – piano
- Al McKibbon – bass
- Billy Higgins – drums
