= Joe Roland =

American jazz vibraphonist (1920–2009)

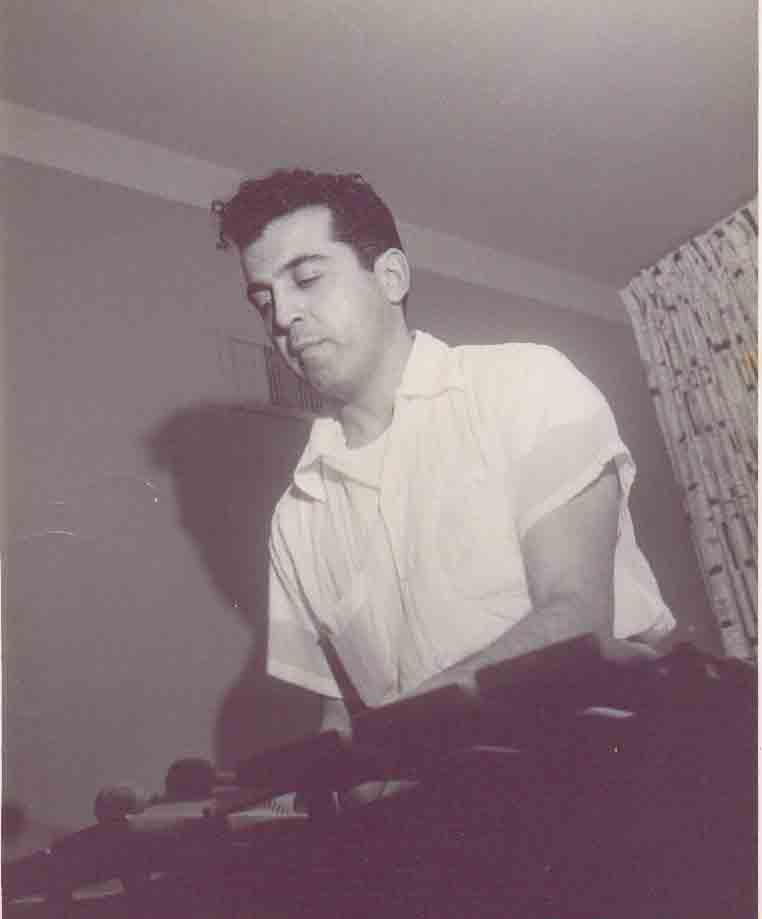
- Joe Roland playing vibes in the 1940s

Background information
- Born: May 17, 1920
- Died: October 12, 2009 (aged 89) West Palm Beach, Florida, U.S.
- Genres: Jazz
- Instruments: Clarinet; vibraphone
- Labels: Rainbow; Savoy; Seeco; Bethlehem

Joe Roland (May 17, 1920 – October 12, 2009) was an American jazz vibraphonist.

Roland began as a clarinetist, attending the Institute of Musical Art (later known as the Juilliard School) from 1937 to 1939. He started on xylophone in 1940 and began playing vibraphone in the middle of the decade, playing in jazz clubs in New York City. Influenced by the nascent bebop movement, Roland put together his own ensembles late in the decade, and in the 1950s he played with Oscar Pettiford (1951), George Shearing (1951–1953), Howard McGhee, and Artie Shaw and his Gramercy Five (1953–1954), Freddie Redd (1955), Mat Mathews (1956), and Aaron Sachs (1956).

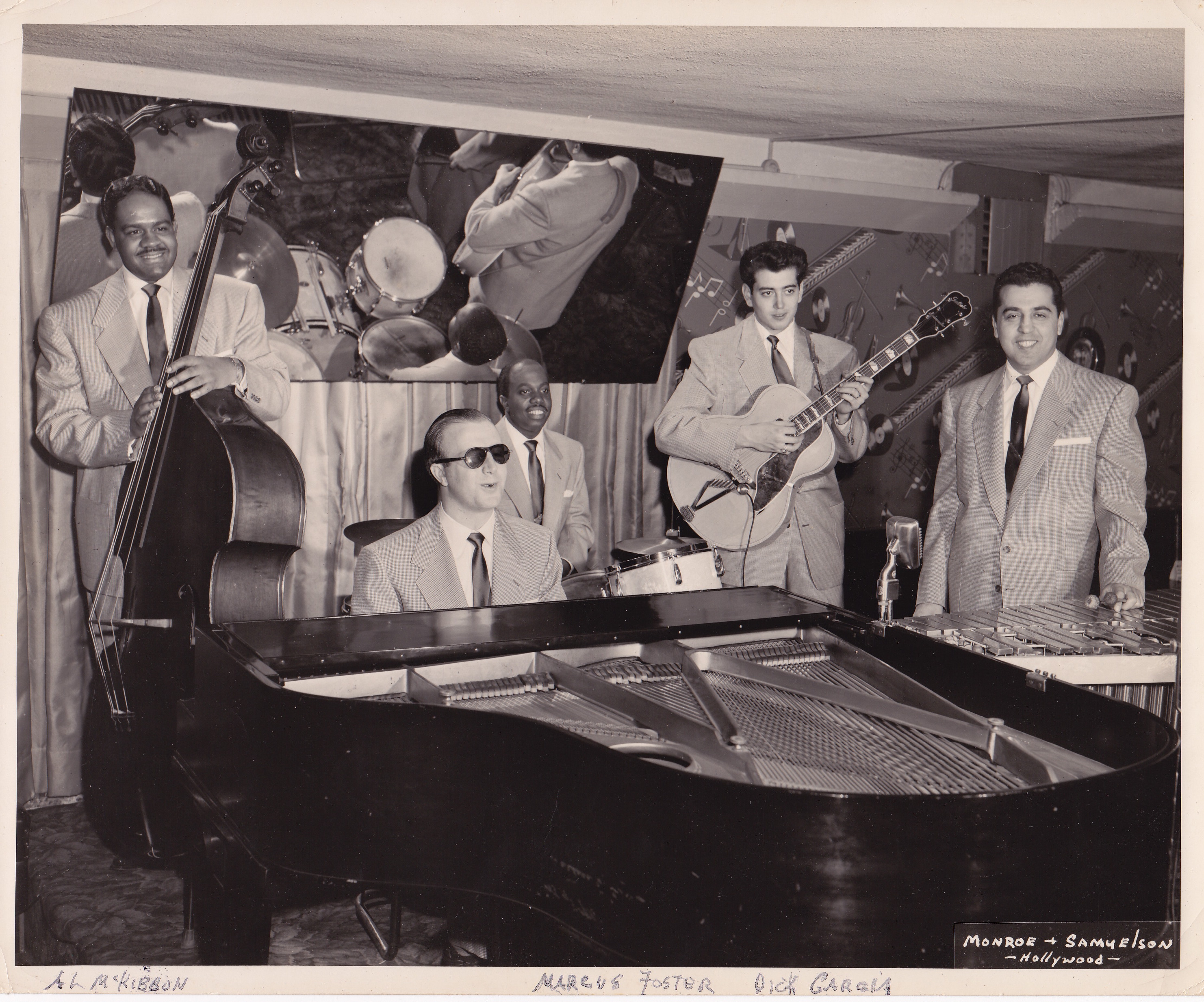
Al McKibbon, George Shearing, Marcus Foster, Dick Garcia, Joe Roland

Roland recorded occasionally as a leader; he released on Rainbow in 1949, on Savoy (1950, 1954), Seeco (1953–1954), and Bethlehem (1955).

In the early sixties, Roland relocated from New York to Miami, Florida. He was an influential part of a thriving jazz scene in South Florida for many years. During his 13-year "gig" at Monty Trainer's Bayshore Restaurant in Coconut Grove, he was credited for having trained many young musicians from the University of Miami. He worked steadfastly throughout his life in local clubs accompanied by bassists such as Lew Berryman and Mark Trail, and singers like Sandy Patton. He died of natural causes at the age of 89 in Palm Beach County, Florida.

Roland's contributions can be appreciated in a quote from Peter Dempsy regarding Artie Shaw's Summit Ridge Drive album: "The Gramercy Five recordings of 1953 and 1954 document a brilliant phase in early modern jazz, manifested in the presence of pianist Hank Jones, guitarist Tal Farlow, bassist Tommy Potter and vibraphonist Joe Roland.

== Discography ==
- Joltin' Joe Roland (Savoy, 1955) – rec. 1950, 1954
- Good Good Listening (1955)
- Joe Roland Quintette (Bethlehem, 1956)
