= Cedar Park Cemetery, New Jersey =

Cemetery in Bergen County, New Jersey

Cedar Park Cemetery
- Interactive map of Cedar Park Cemetery

Details
- Location: Emerson and Paramus, New Jersey
- Country: United States
- Coordinates: 40°58′17″N 74°03′05″W
- Type: Public
- Owned by: Cedar Park and Beth El Cemeteries
- No. of graves: >18,000
- Website: Official website
- Find a Grave: Cedar Park Cemetery
- Footnotes: GNIS data

Cedar Park and Beth El Cemetery is a cemetery located in Emerson and Paramus, in Bergen County, New Jersey, United States.

== Noted interments ==
- Martin Balsam (1919–1996) Academy Award winning best supporting actor
- Julian Beck (1925–1985), actor, director, poet, and painter
- Judith Malina (1926–2015), actress, director and writer
- Maxwell Bodenheim (1891–1954), poet and novelist
- Ernst Cassirer (1874–1945), philosopher
- Manfred Clynes (1925–2020), scientist and inventor
- Myron Cohen (1902–1986), comedian and storyteller
- Sammy Fain (1902–1989), composer of popular music
- Leonard Farbstein (1902–1993), US Congressman
- Lou Jacobi (1913–2009), character actor
- Kitty Kallen (1921–2016), big-band singer
- Elias Karmon (1910–2008), businessman and community leader
- Abraham Krotoshinsky (1892-1953), US Army soldier of the Lost Battalion and Distinguished Service Cross recipient
- Estee Lauder (1908–2004), businesswoman, cosmetics mogul
- Joe E. Lewis (1902–1971), comedian and singer
- John Marley (1907–1984), actor
- B.S. Pully (1910–1972), actor
- Hanon Reznikov (1950–2008), actor and writer
- Delmore Schwartz (1913–1966), poet
- Isaac Bashevis Singer (1903–1991), winner of the Nobel Prize for Literature
- Maurice Tempelsman (1929–2025), businessman, diamond magnate, merchant and romantic partner of Jackie Kennedy Onassis

== See also ==
- Bergen County Cemeteries
