= San Francisco Suite =

San Francisco Suite for Jazz Trio

Studio album by Freddie Redd
- Released: 1958
- Recorded: October 2, 1957
- Genre: Jazz
- Length: 40:30
- Label: Riverside

Freddie Redd chronology
Piano East - Piano West (1955)	San Francisco Suite for Jazz Trio (1958)	The Connection (1960)

San Francisco Suite for Jazz Trio is an album by American pianist Freddie Redd recorded in 1957 and released on the Riverside label.

== Reception ==
Professional ratings
Review scores
Source	Rating
Allmusic	4.5/5 stars
The Penguin Guide to Jazz Recordings	3/4 stars

The Allmusic review by Scott Yanow awarded the album 4½ stars and stated: "An excellent effort".

== Track listing ==
All compositions by Freddie Redd, except as indicated

1. "San Francisco Suite: View of the Golden Gate Bridge from Sausalito / Grant Street (Chinatown) / Barbary Coast / Cousin Jimbo's Between 3 & 7 A.M. / Dawn In The City" - 13:26
2. "Blue Hour" - 3:33
3. "By Myself" (Howard Dietz, Arthur Schwartz) - 3:43
4. "Ol' Man River" (Oscar Hammerstein II, Jerome Kern) - 4:01
5. "Minor Interlude" - 4:57
6. "This Is New" (Ira Gershwin, Kurt Weill) - 6:31
7. "Nica Steps Out" - 4:19

- Recorded in New York City on October 2, 1957.

== Personnel ==
- Freddie Redd - piano
- George Tucker - bass
- Al Dreares - drums
