= Al Dreares =

American jazz drummer

Alfred Dreares II (January 4, 1927 – November 17, 2011) was an American jazz drummer.

== Early life ==
Dreares was born in Key West, Florida, on January 4, 1927. He was a childhood friend of Fats Navarro, and studied at Hartnett Conservatory in New York City on the advice of his father, a trumpeter.

== Later life and career ==
He played early in his career in the bands of Paul Williams, and with Teddy Charles in 1955. The next year he played with Charles Mingus. In 1957 he recorded with Freddie Redd and worked with Kenny Burrell; 1958 saw him with Gigi Gryce, and 1959 with Phineas Newborn. He also led his own bands from the late 1950s.

Other credits include recordings with Mal Waldron and Julian Euell, and Bennie Green.

== Discography ==
=== As sideman ===
With Bennie Green

- Walkin' & Talkin' (Blue Note, 1959)
- Bennie Green (Time, 1960)

With Freddie McCoy

- Listen Here (Prestige, 1968)

With Freddie Redd

- San Francisco Suite (Riverside, 1957)

With Frank Strozier

- March of the Siamese Children (Jazzland, 1962)

With Mal Waldron

- Left Alone (Bethlehem, 1959)
- Les Nuits de la Negritude (Powertree, 1964)
- Sweet Love, Bitter (Impulse!, 1967)

With Randy Weston

- Jazz à la Bohemia (Riverside, 1956)

Main sources:
