= Freddie Redd =

American jazz pianist (1928–2021)

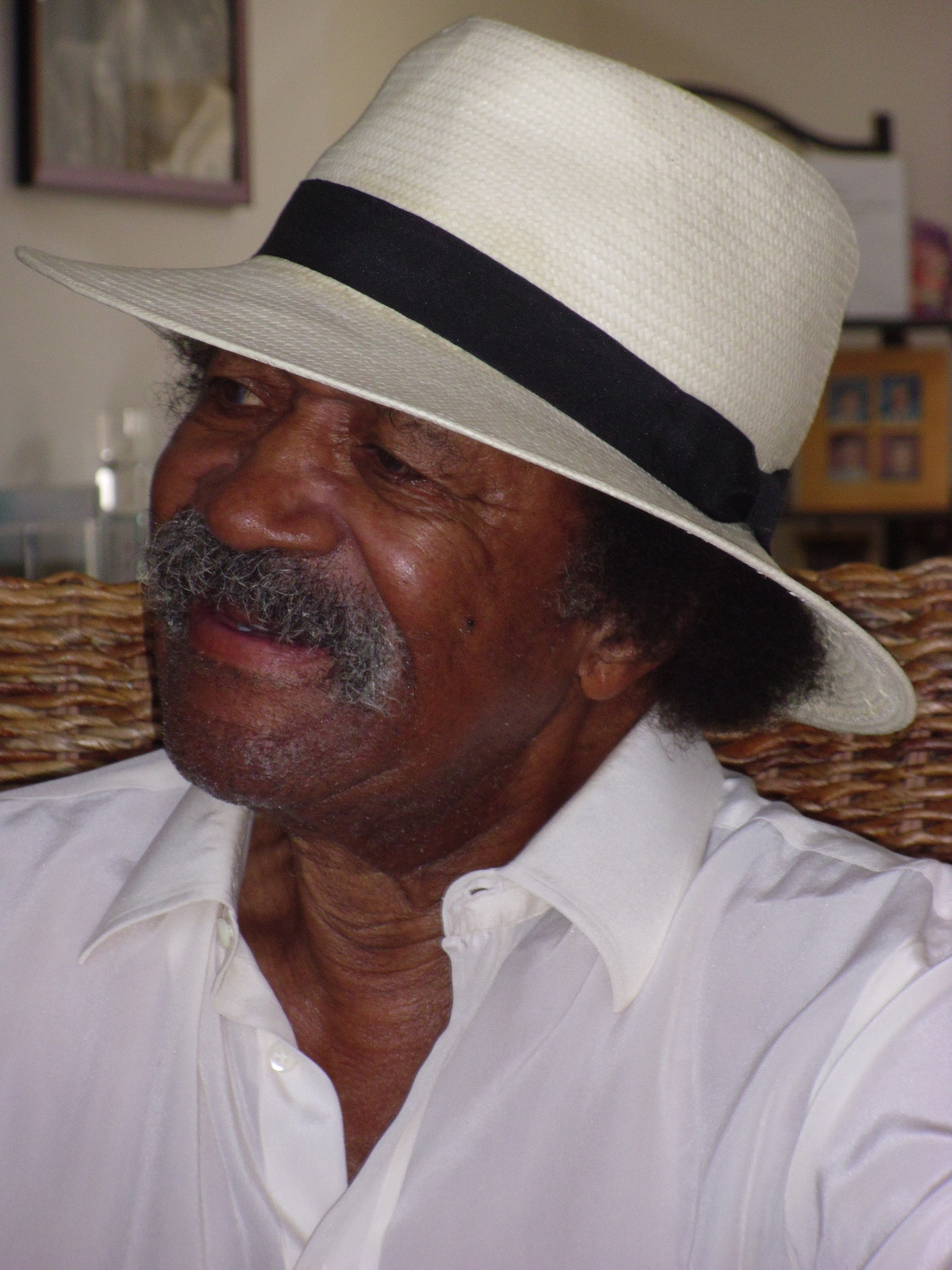
- Freddie Redd in 2013

Background information
- Born: May 29, 1928; Harlem, New York City, U.S.
- Died: March 17, 2021 (aged 92) New York City, U.S.
- Genres: Jazz, hard bop
- Occupations: Musician, composer, actor
- Instruments: Piano, keyboards, organ, composer
- Years active: 1948–2021
- Labels: Blue Note, Savoy, Prestige

Freddie Redd (May 29, 1928 – March 17, 2021) was an American hard-bop pianist and composer. He is best known for writing music to accompany The Connection (1959), a play by Jack Gelber. According to Peter Watrous, writing in The New York Times: "Mr. Redd hung out at jam sessions in the 1950s and played with many of the major figures, Sonny Rollins to Art Blakey, and worked regularly with Charles Mingus. When things got tough, he just moved on, living in Guadalajara, Mexico, and in Paris and London."

== Biography ==
An autodidact, he began playing the piano at a young age and took to studying jazz seriously when he was 18, after a friend played him a record of "Shaw 'Nuff" by Charlie Parker and Dizzy Gillespie during his military service in Korea (1946–1949).

Redd's most successful project was in the late 1950s when he was invited to compose the music for The Living Theatre's New York stage production of The Connection, which was also used in the subsequent 1961 film. In both play and film, he performed as an actor and musician. The theater production was a modest hit and the troupe toured the United States and Europe, performing in New York City, London, and Paris. Redd also led a Blue Note album of his music for the play, featuring on alto sax Jackie McLean, who had also appeared in the play. Redd's success in the theater production, however, did not advance his career in the United States, and shortly afterwards he moved to Europe, spending time in Denmark and France.

== Personal life ==
Redd was born to Freddie Redd and Helen (Snipes) Redd. Redd was born and grew up in New York City; he was raised by his mother, who moved around Harlem, Brooklyn and other neighborhoods. His father was a porter and played piano while his mother was a homemaker. When Redd was two years old, his father died. Using the piano his father had left behind, Redd taught himself how to play. He learned how to play the piano when he was 18.

His late wife, Valarie Lyons Redd, died along with his children, Stephanie Redd and Freddie Redd III. His current family consists of his grandson, Leslie Clarke, a stepdaughter, Susan Redd, and two other grandchildren as well as two step-grandchildren.

After leaving high school, Redd enlisted in the Army in 1946, where he was introduced to bebop. This is where he spent the next three years learning more about the piano and playing gigs with his friends throughout bases and camps within South Korea. There were pianos in every recreation room, which is where Redd taught himself how to play and formed a band during his time of service. After three years of being in the army, he left and was set on becoming a jazz musician. Redd was passionate about practicing and listened to many of his inspirations, such as Charlie Parker, Bud Powell, and Thelonious Monk.

Redd was passionate about moving around and enjoyed the lifestyle of traveling to new places. In the 1960s, Redd spent time traveling to various regions, among which were Copenhagen, Amsterdam, Paris, London, Pittsburgh, San Francisco, Los Angeles, Guadalajara, Baltimore, and Carrboro. Redd mentioned that the main reason as to why he lived in various countries in Europe was due to the environment and how they accepted artists. The main drive for Redd moving to Europe in the 1960s and '70s was because of the many opportunities it provided him. Redd lived in Los Angeles in the late 1970s, where he recorded Straight Ahead. It was not until he reached his 80s that he returned home to New York to continue recording albums.

It was revealed that Redd did not begin working towards his goal in music until he hit the age of seventeen, however, he always had an interest in music ever since he started watching Salvation Army bands as a kid.

== Career ==
Redd returned to New York in 1949 after his enlistment ended, and there he played with various artists including Gene Ammons, Sonny Rollins, and Art Farmer. Upon discharge, he worked with drummer Johnny Mills, and then in New York played with Tiny Grimes, Cootie Williams, Oscar Pettiford and the Jive Bombers. In 1954, he played with Art Blakey. Redd toured Sweden in 1956 with Ernestine Anderson and Rolf Ericson. This is also where he recorded his first known album, Freddie Redd Trio, in 1955. He was the leader of Prestige and toured Sweden in 1956 with Ernestine Anderson and Rolf Ericson. After returning to the U.S., Redd visited San Francisco to work as a house pianist at Bop City and recorded for Riverside. He continued to perform with Charles Mingus soon after.

Redd was convicted of possession of marijuana, resulting in the loss of his cabaret card. This led him to move to Greenwich Village, where he continued with his music career in a loft alongside visual artists and poets since he was not allowed to perform in clubs without his card. Redd also continued to apply to the Greenwich House School of Music before leaving and getting his first professional job at Hy’s in Syracuse. After spending time with people who had creative pursuits, he met Gary Goodrow, who was a known saxophonist and actor who had a role in The Connection. He eventually introduced Redd to author Jack Gelber, who played a major role in the creation of his biggest accomplishment from The Connection.

Redd originally recorded enough material for an album in 1961, however, the tapes were put away once he had a conflict with one of Blue Note’s founders, Alfred Lion. These tapes were discovered later on and Redd released them in 1988 with his album, Redd’s Blues.

During Redd's time of staying in Europe, he played in various regions. However, within this period, he had only recorded one trio session, named Under Paris Skies (Future) in 1971.

Redd struggled to establish himself commercially; however, musically, his creative lines, particular voicings and innovative compositions solidified his reputation; he worked with such musicians as Jackie McLean, Tina Brooks, Paul Chambers, Howard McGhee, Milt Hinton, Lou Donaldson, Benny Bailey, Charles Mingus, Louis Hayes, Al McKibbon, Billy Higgins, Osie Johnson, Tommy Potter, and Joe Chambers, among others. He even contributed organ to James Taylor's original 1968 recording of "Carolina in My Mind". Redd recorded several albums as leader, including two other Blue Note albums (although the last of these was not issued for many years). In 1989, his three Blue Note albums were reissued as The Complete Blue Note Recordings of Freddie Redd, the liner notes of which quoted Jackie McLean as saying: "You never know what town you'll see [ Freddie ] in. He's always been itinerant. Freddie just appears from time to time, like some wonderful spirit."

He returned to the United States in 1974 and resettled on the West Coast; he became a regular on the San Francisco scene and recorded intermittently until 1990. In 2011, he resettled in Baltimore.

Redd completed a European tour in 2013, and two albums he made that year – Reminiscing and (with Butch Warren) Baltimore Jazz Loft were issued in February 2021.

== Death ==
Redd died in New York City on March 17, 2021, aged 92. He died at a Manhattan care facility. His grandson, Leslie Clarke, announced that Redd had died in his sleep but the reason was not reported.

== Discography ==
=== As leader/co-leader ===
Recording date	Title	Label	Year released	Notes
1955	Introducing Freddie Redd also released as Freddie Redd/Hampton Hawes Piano: East/West ( Prestige, 1956) and Move!/Hampton Hawes and Freddie Redd (Status/Prestige, 1965)	Prestige	1955	
1956-09	Get Happy with Freddie Redd	Pye Nixa	1958	
1956-09	In Sweden	Baybridge	1973	
1957-10	San Francisco Suite	Riverside	1958	
1960-02	The Music from "The Connection"	Blue Note	1960	
1960-08	Shades of Redd	Blue Note	1961	
1961-01	Redd's Blues	Blue Note	1988	
1971-07	Under Paris Skies	Futura	1971	
1977-12	Straight Ahead! also released as Jazz Is (Trio, early 1990s)	Interplay	1978	
1978-08, 1978-09	Extemporaneous	Interplay	1978	
1985-01	Lonely City	Uptown	1989	
1988-05	Live at the Studio Grill	Triloka	1990	Live
1990-10	Everybody Loves a Winner	Milestone	1991	
1991-07	Freddie Redd and his International Jazz Connection	Fairplay INJazz	1998	
2013-01	Reminiscing	Bleebop	2021	
2013-01	Baltimore Jazz Loft with Butch Warren	Bleebop	2021	
2014-11	Music for You	Steeplechase	2015	
2014-11, 2015-02	With Due Respect	Steeplechase	2016	

=== As sideman ===
With Tiny Grimes

- The Complete 1950–1954, Volume 3 (1950) (Blue Moon, 1995) – compilation
- The Complete 1950–1954, Volume 4 (1950–1953) (Blue Moon, 1995) – compilation
- The Complete 1950-1954, Volume 5 (1954) / The Complete 1949 J.B. Summers (Blue Moon, 1995) – compilation

With Joe Roland

- Joltin' Joe Roland (Savoy, 1955) – rec. 1950-1954
- Joe Roland Quintette (Bethlehem, 1955)

With others

- Gene Ammons, All Star Sessions (Prestige, 1956) – rec. 1950-1955
- Rolf Ericson, Rolf Ericson & The American All Stars (Dragon, 1956)
- Art Farmer, When Farmer Met Gryce (Prestige, 1955)
- Howard McGhee, Music from the Connection (Felsted, 1960)
