= Dusty Blue =

Studio album by Howard McGhee
- Released: 1961
- Recorded: June 13, 1960; New York City
- Genre: Jazz
- Length: 35:13
- Label: Bethlehem; BCP 6055
- Producer: Teddy Charles

Howard McGhee chronology
Life is Just a Bowl of Cherries (1956)	Dusty Blue (1961)	Music from the Connection (1960)

Dusty Blue is an album by trumpeter Howard McGhee which was recorded in 1960 and released on the Bethlehem label.

== Reception ==
Professional ratings
Review scores
Source	Rating
Allmusic	4/5 stars

Allmusic reviewer Ken Dryden stated: " With the exception of Together Again with Teddy Edwards, the 1950s had largely been a waste for Howard McGhee, as drug addiction had taken its toll on his playing. But he is in good form for this 1961 studio session for Bethlehem".

== Track listing ==
All compositions by Howard McGhee, except as indicated

1. "Dusty Blue" - 2:53
2. "The Sound of Music" (Oscar Hammerstein II, Richard Rodgers) - 3:22
3. "I Concentrate on You" (Cole Porter) - 4:06
4. "Sleep Talk" - 2:55
5. "Park Avenue Petite (From Dream To Dream)" (Benny Golson) - 3:32
6. "Flyin' Colors" - 5:52
7. "With Malice Towards None" (Tom McIntosh) - 4:02
8. "Groovin' High" (Dizzy Gillespie) - 4:19
9. "A Cottage for Sale" (Larry Conley, Willard Robison) - 4:28

== Personnel ==
- Howard McGhee - trumpet
- Bennie Green - trombone (tracks 1, 5, 6 & 8)
- Roland Alexander - tenor saxophone (tracks 1, 5, 6 & 8)
- Pepper Adams - baritone saxophone (tracks 1, 5, 6 & 8)
- Tommy Flanagan - piano
- Ron Carter - bass
- Walter Bolden - drums
