= Carl Lee (actor) =

American actor (1926–1986)

- Born: Carl Vincent Canegata; November 22, 1926; New York City, New York, U.S.
- Died: April 17, 1986 (aged 59); New York City, New York, U.S.
- Occupations: Actor, scriptwriter, voice actor
- Years active: 1954–1983
- Father: Canada Lee

Carl Lee (born Carl Vincent Canegata; November 22, 1926 – April 17, 1986) was an American actor. His father was actor/professional boxer Canada Lee.

== Biography ==
Lee, billed as Canada Lee Jr at age 25, played a student at Tuskegee Institute in an April 1952 episode of American Inventory. His father starred in the episode as George Washington Carver. Lee made his first film appearance in Human Desire (1954). Lee played a heroin dealer, the central role in the Obie Award-winning play The Connection. He appeared in the film version released in 1961.

Lee appeared in films such as A Man Called Adam (1966) opposite Sammy Davis Jr. and Cicely Tyson, and the blaxploitation film Superfly (with Ron O'Neal, 1972). He also appeared on television in such shows as The Defenders, Mannix, and Good Times ("Willona's Surprise", 1977) in which he portrayed Willona Woods' ex-husband Ray, who makes sexual advances towards the character Thelma Evans.

While filming The Connection, Lee fell in love with its director, Shirley Clarke. Their relationship lasted almost 30 years until Lee's death.

Lee suffered a heroin addiction that caused him to contract AIDS from a dirty hypodermic needle. He died from a heroin overdose in 1986. In a 2000 interview, filmmaker James Toback stated "In the sort of hip world of New York, Carl Lee was the hip-black-actor icon. He was for hip people what Sidney Poitier was for mainstream people."

== Acting filmography ==
Films

- Human Desire (1954) as John Thurston (uncredited)
- The Connection (1961) as Cowboy
- The Cool World (1964) as Priest
- A Man Called Adam (1966)
- Portrait of Jason (1967, off-screen voice)
- The Landlord (1970) as Carl
- Pound (1970) as Thief
- Werewolves on Wheels (1971)
- Super Fly (1972) as Eddie
- Gordon's War (1973) as Bee Bishop
- Exposed (1983) as Duke

Television

- The Nurses (1963) as Lonnie Hill
- The Defenders (1965) as Philip Dunning
- Caribe (1975) as Haines
- Mannix (1975) as Ginger
- Barbary Coast (1975) as Currier
- Serpico (1976) as Carothers
- Good Times (1977) as Ray Woods
- Keeping On (1981) as Davis
