= The Return of Howard McGhee =

Studio album by Howard McGhee
- Released: 1956
- Recorded: October 22, 1955; New York City
- Genre: Jazz
- Length: 35:13
- Label: Bethlehem; BCP 42

Howard McGhee chronology
Howard McGhee and Milt Jackson (1948)	The Return of Howard McGhee (1956)	Life is Just a Bowl of Cherries (1956)

The Return of Howard McGhee is an album by trumpeter Howard McGhee which was recorded in 1955 and released on the Bethlehem label.

== Reception ==
Professional ratings
Review scores
Source	Rating
Allmusic	4/5 stars

Allmusic awarded the album 4 stars.

== Track listing ==
All compositions by Howard McGhee except as indicated

1. "Get Happy" (Harold Arlen, Ted Koehler) - 3:52
2. "Tahitian Lullaby" - 4:08
3. "Lover Man" (Jimmy Davis, Ram Ramirez, James Sherman) - 2:50
4. "Lullaby of the Leaves" (Bernice Petkere, Joe Young) - 3:22
5. "You're Teasing Me" - 2:15
6. "Transpicuous" - 2:36
7. "Rifftide (Hackensack)" (Thelonious Monk) - 5:37
8. "Oo-Wee But I Do" - 5:11
9. "Don't Blame Me" (Dorothy Fields, Jimmy McHugh) - 3:09
10. "Tweedles" - 3:10
11. "I'll Remember April" (Gene DePaul, Patricia Johnston, Don Raye) - 5:47

== Personnel ==
- Howard McGhee - trumpet
- Sahib Shihab - baritone saxophone, alto saxophone (tracks 1, 2, 4-9 & 11)
- Duke Jordan - piano
- Percy Heath - bass
- Philly Joe Jones - drums
