= Hanon Reznikov =

American dramatist

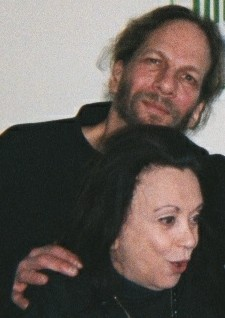
- Reznikov & Judith Malina, 2003
- Born: September 23, 1950
- Died: May 3, 2008 (aged 57); New York
- Other name: Howard Reznick
- Occupations: Actor, writer
- Years active: 1970–2008
- Known for: The Living Theatre
- Spouse: Judith Malina (m. 1988)

Signature
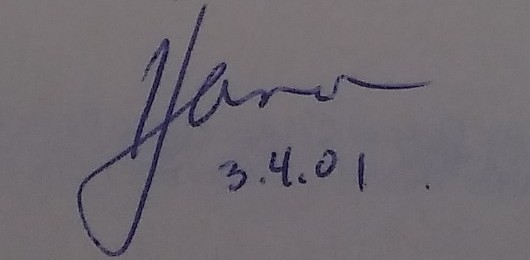

Hanon Reznikov (born Howard Reznick; September 23, 1950 – May 3, 2008) was an American actor and writer.

He was also the co-director of The Living Theatre in New York City together with Judith Malina after Julian Beck's death in 1985. He and Malina were married in 1988.

Reznikov died of pneumonia at the age of 57 in May, 2008, following a stroke in April.
