= The Brig (play) =

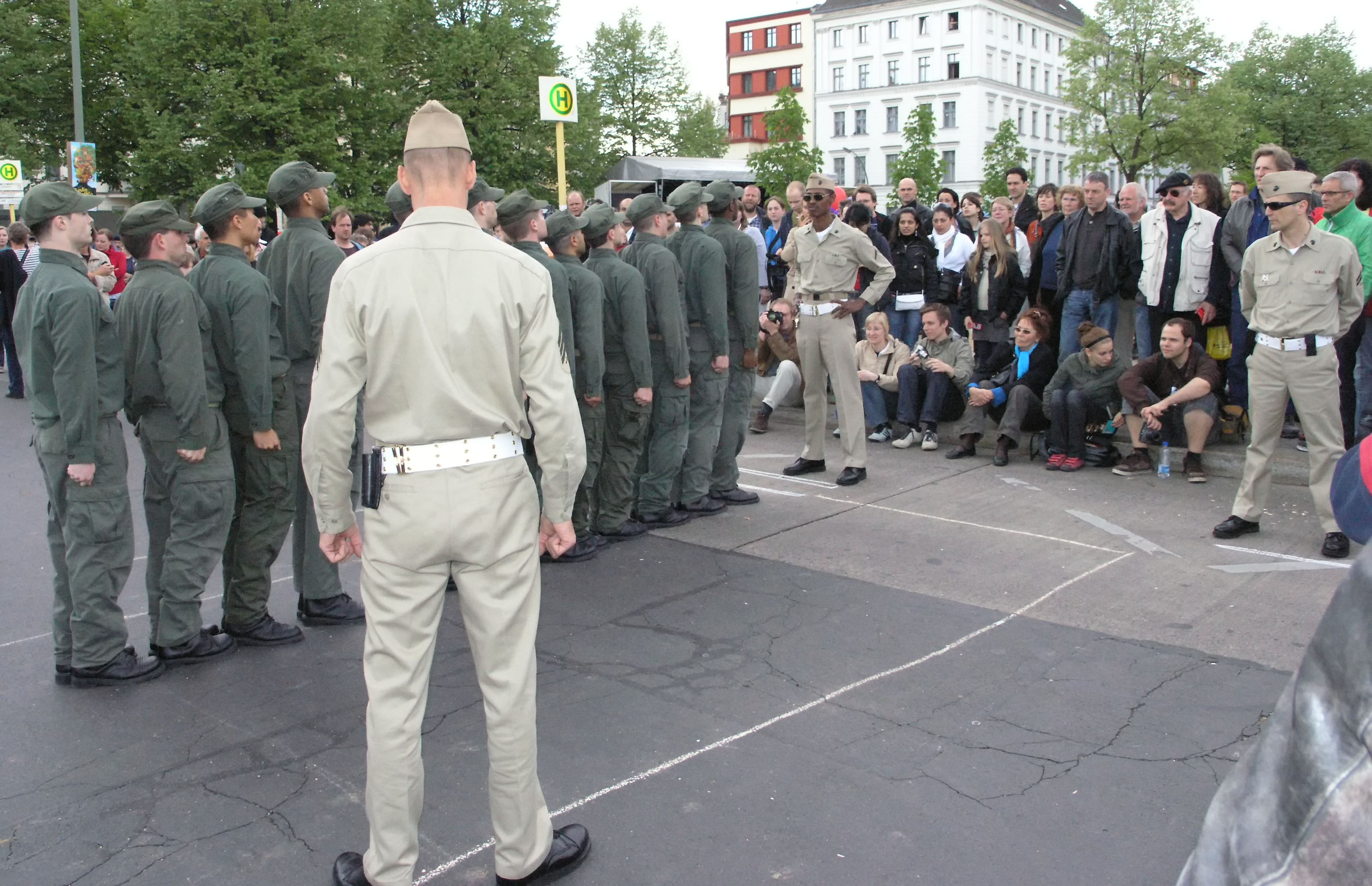
The Living Theatre presenting their play The Brig at Myfest 2008 in Berlin-Kreuzberg.

The Brig is a play written by Kenneth H. Brown (1936–2022) based on his experiences as a U.S. Marine. It was first performed in New York by The Living Theatre on May 13, 1963, with a production filmed in 1964 by Jonas Mekas. The Brig received three Obie Awards in 1964, for Best Production (play), Best Design (Julian Beck) and Best Direction (Judith Malina).

== Summary ==
The play depicts a typical day in a U.S. Marine Corps military prison called the brig. Brown spent 30 days in a brig for being absent without leave while serving with the Third Marines at Camp Fuji, Japan in the 1950s.

== Adaptations ==
The play was adapted into a 1964 film, directed by Malina, Adolfas Mekas, and Jonas Mekas.

== Revival ==
The Brig was revived in New York in 2007, and it received an Obie Special Citation for its ensemble and director Judith Malina. In 2009, it was performed as an unlicensed production at the New World School of the Arts, Theatre Division in Miami, produced by Dean Patrice Bailey and directed by Matthew D. Glass. No legal action was taken.
