= Kenneth H. Brown =

American playwright (1936–2022)

Kenneth Howard Brown (March 9, 1936 – February 5, 2022) was an American playwright and novelist. His play, The Brig, won three Obie Awards. It was adapted into film by Jonas Mekas.

== Background ==
Brown was born in New York City, New York in Brooklyn, and served in the United States Marine Corps. Brown went to Columbia University and was a bartender; He died on February 5, 2022, at the age of 85 in New York City in a hospice in the Queens from cancer. His papers are held at the Harry Ransom Center at the University of Texas at Austin.

== Plays ==
- The Brig
- Nightlight

== Books ==
- The Narrows
- Hitler’s Analysts
