= Maggie's Back in Town!! =

Studio album by Howard McGhee
- Released: 1961
- Recorded: June 26, 1961; Contemporary Records Studio, Los Angeles, California
- Genre: Jazz
- Length: 42:23
- Label: Contemporary; M 3596/S 7596
- Producer: Lester Koenig

Howard McGhee chronology
Together Again!!!! (1961)	Maggie's Back in Town!! (1961)	The Sharp Edge (1961)

Maggie's Back in Town!! is an album by trumpeter Howard McGhee which was recorded in 1961 and released on the Contemporary label.

== Reception ==
Professional ratings
Review scores
Source	Rating
Allmusic	4.5/5 stars
The Rolling Stone Jazz Record Guide	3/5 stars
The Penguin Guide to Jazz Recordings	3/4 stars

Allmusic awarded the album 4½ stars, calling it "McGhee's finest recording of the period" and stating: "This CD is a perfect starting point for listeners not familiar with the underrated (and often overlooked) Howard McGhee".

== Track listing ==
1. "Demon Chase" (Howard McGhee) - 7:50
2. "Willow Weep for Me" (Ann Ronell) - 4:20
3. "Softly, as in a Morning Sunrise" (Oscar Hammerstein II, Sigmund Romberg) - 3:13
4. "Sunset Eyes" (Teddy Edwards) - 5:10
5. "Maggie's Back in Town" (Edwards) - 10:36
6. "Summertime" (George Gershwin, Ira Gershwin, DuBose Heyward) - 3:11
7. "Brownie Speaks" (Clifford Brown) - 8:03

== Personnel ==
- Howard McGhee - trumpet
- Phineas Newborn, Jr. - piano
- Leroy Vinnegar - bass
- Shelly Manne - drums
