= Howard McGhee and Milt Jackson =

Studio album by Howard McGhee and Milt Jackson
- Released: 1955
- Recorded: February 1948
- Genre: Jazz
- Label: Savoy; MG 12026

Howard McGhee chronology
Trumpet at Tempo (1946–47)	Howard McGhee and Milt Jackson (1955)	The Return of Howard McGhee (1955)

Milt Jackson chronology
Wizard of the Vibes (1952)	Howard McGhee and Milt Jackson (1955)	Milt Jackson Quartet (1955)

Howard McGhee and Milt Jackson is an album by American jazz trumpeter Howard McGhee with vibraphonist Milt Jackson featuring performances recorded in 1948 and released by the Savoy label in 1955 on a 12-inch LP.

== Reception ==
The Allmusic review by Jim Todd stated: "this is an unpretentious slice of bebop heaven, particularly attractive to listeners interested in the trumpeter".

Professional ratings
Review scores
Source	Rating
Allmusic	4/5 stars

== Track listing ==
All compositions by Howard McGhee except as indicated

1. "Merry Lee" - 2:04
2. "Short Life" - 1:57
3. "Talk of the Town" (Jerry Livingston, Al J. Neiburg, Marty Symes) - 2:50
4. "Bass C Jam" (Herman Lubinsky) - 2:56
5. "Flip Lip" - 2:29
6. "Belle from Bunnycock" - 2:44
7. "Down Home" - 2:44
8. "Sweet and Lovely" (Gus Arnheim, Jules LeMare, Harry Tobias) - 2:59
9. "Fiesta" (M. Daniels) - 2:08
10. "I'm in the Mood for Love" (Jimmy McHugh, Dorothy Fields) - 2:53
11. "The Man I Love" (George Gershwin, Ira Gershwin) - 2:39
12. "The Last Word" - 2:20
- corrected recording date info: tracks 5, 6, 11 & 12, October 15 or November 10, 1947; tracks 1–4 & 7–10, December 24–31, 1947 (all recorded in Chicago for the Vitacoustic Records label).

== Personnel ==
- Howard McGhee - trumpet
- Milt Jackson - vibraphone (tracks 1–4 & 7–10)
- Billy Eckstine - valve trombone (tracks 5, 6 & 12)
- Jimmy Heath - alto saxophone, baritone saxophone (tracks 1–4, 7 & 10)
- Kenny Mann - tenor saxophone (tracks 5, 6 & 12)
- Will Davis (tracks 1–4 & 7–10), Hank Jones (tracks 5, 6, 11 & 12) - piano
- Percy Heath (tracks 1–4 & 7–10), Ray Brown (tracks 5, 6, 11 & 12) - bass
- Joe Harris (tracks 1–4 & 7–10), J.C. Heard (tracks 5, 6, 11 & 12) - drums
- Marcel Daniels (tracks 5 & 12) - vocal
