= Extemporaneous (album) =

Studio album by Freddie Redd
- Released: 1978
- Recorded: August 14, 1978 & September 23, 1978
- Studio: United/Western Studios, Hollywood, CA
- Genre: Jazz
- Length: 30:13
- Label: Interplay; IP-9004
- Producer: Toshiya Taenaka

Freddie Redd chronology
Straight Ahead! (1978)	Extemporaneous (1978)	Redd's Blues (1988)

Extemporaneous is a solo album by jazz pianist Freddie Redd recorded in 1977 and released on the Interplay label.

== Reception ==
Professional ratings
Review scores
Source	Rating
Allmusic	4/5 stars

The review by Scott Yanow for Allmusic states: "This album from Interplay gave Freddie Redd a rare opportunity to record unaccompanied solos. He interprets eight of his own somewhat obscure compositions with swing, taste and enough variety to hold on to one's attention".

== Track listing ==
All compositions by Freddie Redd

1. "Night Song" – 4:11
2. "I'm Sorry" – 4:06
3. "Gateway East" – 2:49
4. "Blue Notes" – 4:01
5. "Syncopation Waltz" – 4:10
6. "Extemporaneous" – 5:15
7. "Unfinished Symphony" – 2:44
8. "For Art's Sake" – 2:56

== Personnel ==
- Freddie Redd – piano
