= Joe Roland Quintette =

Studio album by Joe Roland
- Released: June 1955
- Recorded: March 17 & 18, 1955
- Studio: Van Gelder Studio, Hackensack, NJ
- Genre: Jazz
- Label: Bethlehem; BCP-17
- Producer: Creed Taylor

Joe Roland chronology
Joltin' Joe Roland (1955)	Joe Roland Quintette (1955)

Joe Roland Quintette (also released as Easy Living) is an album by jazz vibraphonist Joe Roland which was released on the Bethlehem label in 1955.

== Reception ==
Professional ratings
Review scores
Source	Rating
Allmusic	4/5 stars

AllMusic reviewer Scott Yanow described it as "quite worthwhile, mainstream bop of the period... A worthwhile reissue".

== Track listing ==
1. "Easy Living" (Ralph Rainger, Leo Robin) – 5:23
2. "Stairway to the Steinway" (Freedie Redd) – 3:03
3. "Soft Winds" (Benny Goodman) – 2:29
4. "Teach Me Tonight" (Gene De Paul, Sammy Cahn) – 2:40
5. "Robin" (Ismael Ugarte) – 4:00
6. "Sweet Lorraine" (Cliff Burwell, Mitchell Parish) – 3:30
7. "Goodbye Bird" (Joe Roland) – 4:20
8. "After You've Gone" (Turner Layton, Henry Creamer) – 4:51
9. "Anticipation" (Dick Garcia) – 3:50
10. "I Cover the Waterfront" (Johnny Green, Edward Heyman) – 3:42
11. "The Moon Got in My Eyes" (Arthur Johnston, Johnny Burke) – 1:46
12. "Street of Dreams" (Victor Young, Sam M. Lewis) – 2:39

== Personnel ==
- Joe Roland – vibraphone
- Freddie Redd - piano
- Dick Garcia – guitar
- Dante Martucci - bass
- Ron Jefferson - drums
