= Life Is Just a Bowl of Cherries (album) =

Studio album by Howard McGhee
- Released: 1956
- Recorded: February 14 & 15, 1956; New York City
- Genre: Jazz
- Label: Bethlehem; BCP 61

Howard McGhee chronology
The Return of Howard McGhee (1955)	Life Is Just a Bowl of Cherries (1956)	Music from the Connection (1960)

Life Is Just a Bowl of Cherries is an album by trumpeter Howard McGhee featuring songs from the musical film The Best Things in Life Are Free which were recorded in 1956 and released on the Bethlehem label.

== Reception ==
Professional ratings
Review scores
Source	Rating
Allmusic	3/5 stars

Allmusic awarded the album 3 stars.

== Track listing ==
All compositions by Ray Henderson, Buddy DeSylva and Lew Brown except as indicated

1. "Sonny Boy" - 3:54
2. "So Blue" - 2:30
3. "(Here I Am) Broken Hearted" 3:04
4. "The Thrill Is Gone" (Henderson, Brown) - 3:15
5. "Just Imagine" - 3:17
6. "(I'm a Dreamer) Aren't We All" - 3:03
7. "My Song" (Henderson, Brown) - 3:10
8. "The Best Things in Life Are Free" - 2:53
9. "Life Is Just a Bowl of Cherries" (Henderson, Brown) - 2:54
10. "Together" - 2:10
11. "Come To Me" - 3:14
12. "My Sin" - 3:12

== Personnel ==
- Howard McGhee - trumpet
- Danny Bank, Phil Bonder, Sid Brown, Leon Cohen, Herbie Mann - saxophone
- Donn Trenner - piano
- Al Caiola - guitar
- Arnold Fishkind - bass
- Osie Johnson, Don Lamond - drums
- Arranged and conducted by Frank Hunter
