= Kid Blue =

1973 film by James Frawley

- Directed by: James Frawley
- Written by: Bud Shrake (as Edwin Shrake)
- Produced by: Marvin Schwartz
- Starring: Dennis Hopper; Warren Oates; Peter Boyle; Ben Johnson
- Cinematography: Billy Williams
- Edited by: Stefan Arnsten
- Music by: Tim McIntire; John Rubinstein
- Color process: Color by DeLuxe
- Production company: Marvin Schwartz Productions
- Distributed by: 20th Century Fox
- Release date: May 1973
- Running time: 100 minutes
- Country: United States
- Language: English
- Budget: $2 million

Kid Blue is a 1973 American comedy Western film directed by James Frawley and starring Dennis Hopper, Warren Oates, Lee Purcell, Peter Boyle and Ben Johnson.

== Plot ==
Bickford Waner, who has failed as a train robber, decides to go straight and get an honest job. He arrives in Dime Box, Texas, to find work. He is befriended by Reese Ford and his wife Molly. Molly seduces Bickford into getting her pregnant and making her husband miserable.

Bickford's former girlfriend Janet Conforto tracks him down and reveals to Reese and Molly that Bickford is a train robber known as Kid Blue. Bickford returns to his old ways and plots a crime.

== Cast ==
- Dennis Hopper as Bickford Waner
- Warren Oates as Reese Ford
- Peter Boyle as Preacher Bob
- Ben Johnson as Sheriff "Mean John" Simpson
- Lee Purcell as Molly Ford
- Janice Rule as Janet Conforto
- Ralph Waite as Drummer
- Clifton James as Mr. Hendricks
- Jose Torvay as Old Coyote
- Mary Jackson as Mrs. Evans
- Jay Varela as Mendoza
- Claude Ennis Starrett Jr. as Tough Guy
- Warren Finnerty as Wills
- Owen Orr as Train Robber #1
- Richard Rust as Train Robber #2
- Howard Hessman as Confectionary Man
- M. Emmet Walsh as The Barber
- Bobby Hall as The Bartender
- Melvin Stewart as Blackman
- Eddy Donno as Huey

== See also ==
- List of American films of 1973
