= Everybody Loves a Winner =

Studio album by Freddie Redd
- Released: 1991
- Recorded: October 9–10, 1990
- Genre: Jazz
- Length: 60:42
- Label: Milestone MCD 9187-2
- Producer: Eric Miller and Victoria Pedrini

Freddie Redd chronology
Live at the Studio Grill (1990)	Everybody Loves a Winner (1991)	Freddie Redd and His International Jazz Connection (2001)

Everybody Loves a Winner is an album by American jazz pianist Freddie Redd recorded in 1990 and released on the Milestone label.

== Reception ==
Professional ratings
Review scores
Source	Rating
Allmusic	4.5/5 stars

The Allmusic review by Scott Yanow states: "Pianist Freddie Redd has not recorded all that much during his 45-year career, but most of his records have been special events. This particular set has eight of Redd's tightly arranged compositions being performed by a fine sextet".

== Track listing ==
All compositions by Freddie Redd

1. "Give Me a Break" - 4:26
2. "One Up" - 7:05
3. "Melancholia" - 4:59
4. "Everybody Loves a Winner" - 11:45
5. "So Samba" - 8:03
6. "And Time Marches On" - 9:03
7. "One Down" - 7:13
8. "Fuego de Corazon" - 8:08

== Personnel ==
- Freddie Redd - piano
- Curtis Peagler - alto saxophone
- Teddy Edwards - tenor saxophone
- Phil Ranelin - trombone
- Bill Langlois - bass
- Larry Hancock - drums
