= Together Again!!!! =

Studio album by Howard McGhee and Teddy Edwards
- Released: 1961
- Recorded: May 15 & 17, 1961
- Studio: Contemporary Records Studio, Los Angeles, CA
- Genre: Jazz
- Length: 39:46
- Label: Contemporary; M 3588/S 7588
- Producer: Lester Koenig

Howard McGhee chronology
Music from the Connection (1960)	Together Again!!!! (1961)	Maggie's Back in Town!! (1961)

Teddy Edwards chronology
Back to Avalon (1960)	Together Again!!!! (1961)	Good Gravy! (1961)

Together Again!!!! is an album by trumpeter Howard McGhee and saxophonist Teddy Edwards which was recorded in 1961 and released on the Contemporary label.

== Reception ==
Professional ratings
Review scores
Source	Rating
Allmusic	3/5 stars
The Penguin Guide to Jazz Recordings	4/4 stars

Allmusic awarded the album 3 stars stating "The trumpeter was having a short-lived comeback at the time and he had largely regained his earlier form. Edwards sounds as strong as ever and Newborn was an up-and-coming talent. Their collaboration for this boppish date is generally quite memorable". The Penguin Guide to Jazz Recordings awarded the album four stars, and described it as “one of the best mainstream albums of its day.”

== Track listing ==
1. "Together Again" (Teddy Edwards) - 9:45
2. "You Stepped Out of a Dream" (Nacio Herb Brown, Gus Kahn) - 7:17
3. "Up There" (Ray Brown) - 3:27
4. "Perhaps" (Charlie Parker) - 5:12
5. "Misty" (Johnny Burke, Erroll Garner) - 4:15
6. "Sandy" (Howard McGhee) - 9:50

== Personnel ==
- Howard McGhee - trumpet
- Teddy Edwards - tenor saxophone
- Phineas Newborn, Jr. - piano
- Ray Brown - bass
- Ed Thigpen - drums
