= Milt Jackson Quartet =

Studio album by Milt Jackson
- Released: 1955
- Recorded: May 20, 1955
- Studio: Van Gelder Studio, Hackensack, NJ
- Genre: Cool jazz
- Length: 30:59
- Label: Prestige; PR 7003

Milt Jackson chronology
Howard McGhee and Milt Jackson (1955)	Milt Jackson Quartet (1955)	Roll 'Em Bags (1956)

Milt Jackson Quartet (also released as Soul Pioneers) is an album by American jazz vibraphonist Milt Jackson featuring performances recorded in 1955 and released on the Prestige label.

== Reception ==
Professional ratings
Review scores
Source	Rating
AllMusic	4.5/5 stars
The Penguin Guide to Jazz Recordings	3/4 stars

AllMusic writer Scott Yanow stated: "The music itself makes for an enjoyable straight-ahead set".

== Track listing ==
All compositions by Milt Jackson, except where noted.

=== Side A ===
1. "Wonder Why" (Nicholas Brodszky, Sammy Cahn) – 5:26
2. "My Funny Valentine" (Lorenz Hart, Richard Rodgers) – 4:41
3. "Moonray" (Paul Madison, Arthur Quenzer, Artie Shaw) – 5:05

=== Side B ===
1. "The Nearness of You" (Hoagy Carmichael, Ned Washington) – 4:04
2. "Stonewall" – 7:47
3. "I Should Care" (Axel Stordahl, Paul Weston, Sammy Cahn) – 4:20

- Recorded at the Van Gelder Studio, Hackensack, New Jersey on May 20, 1955

== Personnel ==
- Milt Jackson – vibraphone
- Horace Silver – piano
- Percy Heath – bass
- Connie Kay – drums
