= Jack Gelber =

American dramatist

Jack Gelber (April 12, 1932 – May 9, 2003) was an American playwright best known for his 1959 drama The Connection, depicting the life of drug-addicted jazz musicians. The first great success of the Living Theatre, the play was translated into five languages and produced in ten nations. Gelber continued to work and write in New York, where he also taught writing, directing and drama as a professor, chiefly at Brooklyn College, City University of New York, where he created the MFA program in playwriting. In 1999 he received the Edward Albee Last Frontier Playwright Award in recognition of his lifetime of achievements in theatre.

== Early life and education ==
Jack Gelber was born April 12, 1932, in Chicago, the first of three sons of Jewish couple Molly (Singer) and Harold Gelber. Harold was a sheet metal worker, a trade the younger Gelber would briefly adopt to finance his education at the University of Illinois. While at the university, he developed an interest in fiction and began to write short stories. After graduating with a B.S. in Journalism in 1953, Gelber traveled to San Francisco, where he found work as a shipfitter's helper.

== Career ==
In New York, Gelber first worked as a mimeograph operator at the United Nations headquarters. He began writing his first play, The Connection, in late 1957. Two years later, he offered the script to Judith Malina and Julian Beck of the Living Theatre. Malina directed the production, Beck designed it, while Gelber was part of casting, directing rehearsals, and selling tickets. Opening in July 1959, the play was then controversial. Several theatre critics, particularly those writing for the daily newspapers, objected to the play's graphic depiction of heroin addiction and its performance style. The play also attracted prominent supporters, such as the drama critics Kenneth Tynan and Henry Hewes, the poet Allen Ginsberg, the writer Norman Mailer, director Harold Clurman, and Jerry Tallmer, who lauded what they perceived as its innovative style, authentic language, and realism.

The Connection became the Living Theatre's first great success. It brought publicity to both Gelber and the Living Theatre as significant in American theatre. It won the Obie Awards of the Village Voice for Best New Play, Best Production, and Best Actor (Warren Finnerty in the role of Leach) of the 1959–1960 season. Gelber also received the Vernon Rice Award (now known as the Drama Desk Award). In 1961 the Living Theatre took its production to Europe, where it earned the Grand Prix at the Théâtre des Nations Festival in Paris. Ultimately the Living Theatre performed The Connection a total of 722 times in the first years of the 1960s. The Connection has since been translated into five languages and performed in ten countries, as well as throughout the United States. The film version of the play, produced by Lewis Allen and directed by Shirley Clarke in 1961, was also controversial at the time.

Gelber never achieved the same success with his later plays, but he enjoyed a long and active career writing, directing, and teaching drama. His second play, The Apple, opened at the Living Theatre in 1961, but it was the last of Gelber's works produced by the company. Not long after that production, the company moved overseas. In 1963 the Guggenheim Foundation awarded Gelber a fellowship (which it renewed three years later) to support his writing, and in 1964 he published his novel On Ice.

In 1965 he became writer-in-residence at the City College of New York. His third play, Square in the Eye (1965) (also known as Let's Face It) was produced by the Establishment Theatre Company at the Theatre De Lys soon after. Gelber earned his first directing credit in the 1966 production of Arnold Wesker's The Kitchen.

In 1967 Columbia University appointed Gelber as a part-time adjunct professor of drama. In 1968 he completed the script for, and directed a production of, his fourth play The Cuban Thing. This work drew upon his travels as a journalist in Cuba during the 1950s, along with more recent visits in 1964 and 1967. He portrayed a middle-class family's experience of the 1959 revolution. Produced at Henry Miller's Theatre, the play was controversial for what some believed was a favorable portrayal of the communist leader Fidel Castro, when the Cold War was going strong. This interpretation sparked large and sometimes violent protests by Cuban exiles and others against the production, and the play ended its run after only one night. He appears as himself in the 1968 Cuban film Memories of Underdevelopment.

In 1968, Gelber signed the "Writers and Editors War Tax Protest" pledge, vowing to refuse tax payments in protest against the Vietnam War.

In 1972 the Rockefeller Foundation awarded Gelber a fellowship for a residency at the American Place Theatre, where his next play, Sleep, was performed. That same year Gelber become a full-time Professor of English at Brooklyn College of the City University of New York. He created the college's MFA program in playwriting, which he would run until his retirement from CUNY in the late 1990s. In the roughly thirty years he spent at Brooklyn College, he balanced his teaching career with directing professional and student productions and teaching theatre workshops. He received the Obie Award for Distinguished Direction in 1973 when he oversaw the American Place Theatre's production of The Kid by Robert Coover.

Gelber's writing was also supported by a grant from the National Endowment for the Arts and a CBS Fellowship from Yale University. In 1973 the New York Shakespeare Festival produced Barbary Shore, Gelber's adaptation of a 1951 novel written by Norman Mailer. His next production, entitled Farmyard and staged by the Yale Repertory Theatre in 1975, was an adaptation of Franz Xaver Kroetz' 1971 play Stallerhof.

Gelber returned to creating original plays, directing a 1976 production of his drama Jack Gelber's New Play: Rehearsal at the American Place Theatre, and Starters at the Eugene O'Neill Theatre Center in 1980. It was eight years before he had his tenth play, Big Shot, produced at Wildcliff Theatre by the East Coast Arts company. In the 1990s, three more of Gelber's plays were produced: Magic Valley (1990), and Rio Preserved and Chambers (1998).

In the mid-part of the decade, he became an adjunct professor at the Actors Studio Drama School at the New School University, a position he would hold until his death. Gelber's last play to be produced was Dylan's Line. Gelber completed the script in 2000 and performed a portion of it at the Last Frontier Theatre Conference in Valdez, Alaska, that same year. It premiered at the McCarter Theatre in Princeton, New Jersey during 2003.

This was not long after Gelber died on May 9, 2003, in New York, due to Waldenström's macroglobulinemia, a cancer of the blood.

"I was so affected [as a young man] and energized by The Connection", [the playwright] Edward Albee said after his death. "It was exciting, dangerous, instructive and terrifying - all things theater should be."

== Private life ==
In San Francisco, Gelber met Carol Westenberg, and they married on December 23, 1957, in New York City. They had two children.

== Plays ==
- The Connection (1959)
- The Apple (1960)
- Square in the Eye (1965)
- The Cuban Thing (1968)
- Sleep (1972)
- Barbary Shore (1973), adaptation of Norman Mailer's 1951 novel of the same name
- Farmyard (1975), adaptation of Franz Xaver Kroetz's play Stallerhof (1971)
- Jack Gelber's New Play: Rehearsal (1976)
- Starters (1980)
- Big Shot (1988)
- Magic Valley (1990)
- Rio Preserved (1998) and Chambers (1998)
- Dylan's Line (2000), first produced in 2003

== Other writing ==
- On Ice (1964), novel
- Screenplays, including Charlie Siringo (1976), TV production
- Short stories, published in periodicals such as Evergreen Review and Playboy
- Non-fiction articles published by The New York Times, The Nation, The Drama Review, and others

== Legacy and honors ==
- 1960, the production of The Connection won Obie Awards of The Village Voice for Best New Play, Best Production, and Best Actor
- 1960, Vernon Rice Award for outstanding achievement in the off-Broadway theatre
- 1973, Obie Award for Distinguished Direction, for Robert Coover's The Kid
- 1999, he received the Edward Albee Last Frontier Playwright Award in recognition of his lifetime of achievements in theatre
