= Straight Ahead! (Freddie Redd album) =

Studio album by Freddie Redd Trio
- Released: 1978
- Recorded: December 3, 1977
- Studio: United/Western Studios, Hollywood, CA
- Genre: Jazz
- Length: 41:36
- Label: Interplay; IP-7715
- Producer: Toshiya Taenaka

Freddie Redd chronology
| Under Paris Skies (1971) | Straight Ahead! (1978) | Extemporaneous (1978) |

Straight Ahead! is an album by jazz pianist Freddie Redd recorded in 1977 and released on the Interplay label.

Professional ratings
Review scores
| Source | Rating |
|---|---|
| Allmusic | 3/5 stars |

== Track listing ==
All compositions by Freddie Redd, except where indicated

1. "Straight Ahead" – 8:06
2. "Play, Piano, Play" – 9:08
3. "Waltzin' In" – 5:11
4. "'Round Midnight" (Thelonious Monk) – 8:04
5. "On Time" – 4:28
6. "I'll Keep Loving You" (Bud Powell) – 6:39

== Personnel ==
- Freddie Redd – piano
- Henry Franklin – bass
- Carl Burnett – drums
