= Joltin' Joe Roland =

Studio album by Joe Roland
- Released: 1955
- Recorded: January 17, 1950, May 10 & October 17, 1954
- Studio: Van Gelder Studio, Hackensack, NJ
- Genre: Jazz
- Length: 42:27
- Label: Savoy; MG 12039
- Producer: Ozzie Cadena

Joe Roland chronology
Joltin' Joe Roland (1955)	Joe Roland Quintette (1955)

Joe Roland Quartet and Symfonet Cover

Joe Roland Quartet Cover

Joltin' Joe Roland is an album by jazz vibraphonist Joe Roland which was released on the Savoy label in 1955. The album was originally released as two 10-inch LPs recorded at three sessions, two from 1950 and 1954 released as Joe Roland Quartet and Symfonet and the other from 1954 released as Joe Roland Quartet.

== Reception ==
Professional ratings
Review scores
Source	Rating
Allmusic	4.5/5 stars

Allmusic reviewer Scott Yanow stated: " He is paired in two 1954 quintets with either Freddie Redd (who plays conventional bop) and Wade Legge (sounding at his most eccentric) on piano. However the most memorable set is from 1950 for Roland is joined by guitar (Joe Puma), bass, drums and a string quartet. The writing for the strings (which is uncredited) is quite inventive and, although the strings do not solo, they sound very much like a jazz ensemble".

== Track listing ==
All compositions by Wade Legge, except where noted.

1. "Gene's Stew" – 5:24
2. "Spice" – 4:26
3. "Garrity's Flight" (Joe Roland) – 2:46
4. "Indian Summer" (Victor Herbert, Al Dubin) – 2:50
5. "Half Nelson" (Miles Davis) – 3:59
6. "Love Is Just a Plaything" (Roland) – 2:27
7. "Music House" – 3:08
8. "Joyce's Choice" – 2:41
9. "I've Got the World on a String" (Harold Arlen, Ted Koehler) – 4:39
10. "Stephanie's Dance" (Freddie Redd) – 4:25
11. "Sally Is Gone" (Roland) – 2:58
12. "Dee Dee's Dance" (Denzil Best) – 2:44
- Recorded on January 17, 1950 (tracks 5, 6, 11 & 12), May 10, 1954 (tracks 3, 4, 9 & 10) and October 17, 1954 (tracks 1, 2, 7 & 8)

== Personnel ==
- Joe Roland – vibraphone
- Wade Legge, (tracks 1, 2, 7 & 8), Freddie Redd (tracks 3, 4, 9 & 10) – piano
- Joe Puma – guitar (tracks 5, 6, 11 & 12)
- Danny Martucci (tracks 1, 2, 7 & 8), Oscar Pettiford (tracks 3, 4, 9 & 10), Ismael Ugarte (tracks 5, 6, 11 & 12) – bass
- Harold Granowski, (tracks 5, 6, 11 & 12), Ron Jefferson (tracks 1–4 & 7–10) – drums
- Jules Modlin, Gus Oberstein – violin (tracks 5, 6, 11 & 12)
- Mike Bartun – viola (tracks 5, 6, 11 & 12)
- Sid Kassimir – cello (tracks 5, 6, 11 & 12)
- Paula Castle – vocals (track 6)
