= Love and Anger (film) =

Amore e rabbia -Love and Anger-
- A poster bearing the film's English title: Love and Anger
- Directed by: Marco Bellocchio (segment "Discutiamo, discutiamo"); Bernardo Bertolucci (segment "Agonia"); Jean-Luc Godard (segment "L'amore"); Carlo Lizzani (segment "L'indifferenza"); Pier Paolo Pasolini (segment "La sequenza del fiore di carta")
- Written by: Pier Paolo Pasolini; Mauro Bolognini; Marco Bellocchio; Bernardo Bertolucci; Carlo Lizzani; Jean-Luc Godard
- Starring: Nino Castelnuovo; Nino Davoli; Julian Beck; Tom Baker
- Cinematography: Alain Levent; Sandro Marconi
- Edited by: Nino Baragli; Franco Fraticelli
- Music by: Giovanni Fusco
- Release date: 1969
- Running time: 102 minutes
- Countries: Italy; France
- Languages: Italian, French, English, German

Amore e rabbia (Love and Anger) is a 1969 Italian-French anthology film that includes five films directed by four Italian directors and one French director. It premiered at the 19th Berlin International Film Festival in 1969, with the title Vangelo '70. It aimed at representing a secular and contemporary reinterpretation of the evangelical texts.

== Plot ==
The film is composed of episodes that deal with some of the themes present in Jesus' parables and anecdotes of the canonical gospels. These issues, however, are reproduced in the present from their directors.

== Segments ==
=== Indifference ===
A man is suffering from road, badly injured. Passers do not deign to look at him, and continue walking on their way. The episode is taken from Jesus' parable of the Good Samaritan.

=== Agony ===
A bishop is ill and about to die. Before he dies, the man has a vision of God, who tells him that his life has been misspent. The bishop realizes that he spent his life not properly respecting the gospel, but now it is too late.

=== The sequence of the paper flower ===
A beautiful smiling guy's walking on the streets of a city, bringing with him a large poppy paper. The boy is the goodness and innocence of youth, which is soon cut short by human wickedness. Indeed, while the merry boy is walking, the episode shows the evil done by man during the Second World War. At the end of the story, the boy is struck by lightning from the sky and dies, guilty of having been in his life a happy person and a good neighbor.

=== Love ===
A woman and a man're arguing with each other. They represent democracy and the people's revolution that can not get along, although their ideas are similar.

=== We tell, tell ===
A group of young guys occupies a university. Young people are fighters student revolution of the Sixties, and now that they have in hand the building, the guys begin to argue among themselves, bringing new ideas and changes. However, they do nothing but talk nonsense, not changing anything in society.

== Cast ==
Discutiamo, discutiamo directed by Marco Bellocchio and Elda Tattoli

- Marco Bellocchio as Lecturer

Agonia directed by Bernardo Bertolucci

- Julian Beck as Dying Man
- Jim Anderson
- Judith Malina
- Giulio Cesare Castello as Priest
- Adriano Aprà as Clerk
- Fernaldo Di Giammatteo
- Petra Vogt
- Romano Costa as Clerk
- Milena Vukotic as Nurse

L'Amore directed by Jean-Luc Godard

- Christine Guého
- Nino Castelnuovo
- Catherine Jourdan
- Paolo Pozzesi

L'indifferenza directed by Carlo Lizzani

- Tom Baker

La sequenza del fiore di carta directed by Pier Paolo Pasolini

- Ninetto Davoli as Riccetto
- Rochelle Barbini as The little girl
- Aldo Puglisi as Dio
