= Lonely City =

Studio album by Freddie Redd
- Released: 1989
- Recorded: January 18–19, 1985
- Studio: Van Gelder Studio, Englewood Cliffs, NJ
- Genre: Jazz
- Length: 41:00
- Label: Uptown; UP 27.30
- Producer: Mark Feldman

Freddie Redd chronology
Redd's Blues (1988)	Lonely City (1989)	Live at the Studio Grill (1990)

Lonely City is an album by pianist Freddie Redd recorded in 1985 and released by the Uptown label in 1989.

== Reception ==
Professional ratings
Review scores
Source	Rating
AllMusic	4/5 stars
The Penguin Guide to Jazz Recordings	3/4 stars

In his AllMusic review, Scott Yanow states: "Pianist Freddie Redd's first recording in eight years is quite intriguing. Redd is matched with seven diverse players on six of his compositions, most of which are little-known. The music is high-quality hard bop, and the fresh material inspires the musicians. Recommended".

== Track listing ==
All compositions by Freddie Redd

1. "After the Show" – 5:31
2. "Bleeker St. Blues" – 7:26
3. "Emily Reno" – 6:56
4. "Thespian" – 8:26
5. "Lonely City" – 7:49
6. "Had Tadd in Mind" – 4:52

== Personnel ==
- Freddie Redd – piano
- Don Sickler – trumpet, arranger
- Clarence "C" Sharpe – alto saxophone
- Clifford Jordan – tenor saxophone
- Gerry Cappuccio – baritone saxophone
- George Duvivier – double bass
- Ben Riley – drums
