= The Connection (play) =

1959 play by Jack Gelber

- Written by: Jack Gelber
- Music by: Freddie Redd

Premiere
- Date: 1959
- Directed by: Judith Malina

The Connection is a 1959 play by Jack Gelber. It was first produced by the Living Theatre, directed by Living Theatre co-founder Judith Malina, designed by co-founder Julian Beck, and featured music by jazz pianist Freddie Redd.

== Synopsis ==
The play has a play-within-a-play format, with characters Jim Dunn as the "producer" and Jaybird as the "writer" attempting to stage a production about the underbelly of society using "real" addicts. Some of the addicts are jazz musicians. They all (except for the "producer", "writer", and two "photographers") have one thing in common: they are waiting for their drug dealer, their "connection". The dialogue of the characters is interspersed with jazz music.

== Original cast ==
- Jim Dunn – Leonard Hicks
- Jaybird – Ira Lewis
- Leach – Warren Finnerty
- Solly – Jerome Raphel
- Sam – John McCurry
- Ernie – Garry Goodrow
- 1st Musician – Freddie Redd (composer, piano)
- 4th Musician – Jimmy Corbett (bass)
- First Photographer – Louis McKenzie
- Second Photographer – Jamil Zakkai
- 2nd Musician – Jackie McLean (alto saxophone)
- 3rd Musician – Clyde Harris (drums)
- Harry – Henry Proach
- Sister Salvation – Barbara Winchester
- Cowboy – Carl Lee
- Man in audience – Martin Sheen (uncredited)

== Original production credits ==
- Written by Jack Gelber
- Directed by Judith Malina
- Designed by Julian Beck

== Other performances of The Connection ==
=== Revised Cast, 1961 ===
Redd's score, new cast

- Freddie Redd, composer/piano
- Howard McGhee, trumpet
- Tina Brooks (originally Jackie McLean's understudy), tenor saxophone
- Milt Hinton, bass
- Osie Johnson, drums

=== Touring Cast, 1961/62 ===
Score by Cecil Payne and Kenny Drew, Conducted by Cecil Payne

- Cecil Payne, baritone sax
- Clark Terry, trumpet
- Bennie Green, trombone
- Duke Jordan, piano
- Ron Carter, bass
- Charlie Persip, drums

=== Los Angeles Production ===
The score to accompany the Los Angeles production was performed by Dexter Gordon who also played "Number One Musician". He later recorded several pieces from this production for his Blue Note release Dexter Calling... (1961).

Quote (from the liner notes to the Blue Note album): "Soul Sister," the original that launches the first side is one of the themes Dexter wrote for the score of the Hollywood version of The Connection in which he had an acting, playing, and writing role; it is the equivalent of Freddie Redd's "(Theme for) Sister Salvation"... "I Want More", the significantly titled Gordon theme that closes the first side, is the West Coast equivalent of "O.D. (Overdose)"... "Ernie's Theme", is the last of the three themes on this LP from Dexter's Connection score. It parallels "Music Forever".

== Awards and honors ==
=== 1959–60 Village Voice Obie Awards ===
- Obie Award for Best New Play
- Obie Award for Best All-Around Production
- Obie Award for Best Actor - Warren Finnerty

=== 1959–60 Vernon Rice Awards ===
- Vernon Rice Award for outstanding achievement in the off-broadway theatre - Jack Gelber

=== Other ===
- Grand Prix for Best Play at the Théâtre des Nations, Paris, 1961

== Related works ==
Film adaptation

- The Connection, produced by Lewis M. Allen, directed by Shirley Clarke, 1961. Released on DVD, Jazz Movie Classics/EFORFILMS 2869032

Recordings

- The Music from "The Connection", music composed by Freddie Redd, with Freddie Redd, Jackie McLean, Michael Mattos and Larry Ritchie, February 15, 1960, Blue Note, BLP 4027 (m)/BST 84027 (s). Released on CD, Blue Note 89392.
- Music from the Connection, different recording of the above score, issued as under Howard McGhee, with Tina Brooks, I. Ching (Freddie Redd), Milt Hinton and Osie Johnson
- The Music from "The Connection", rewritten score by Cecil Payne and Kenny Drew, Conducted by Cecil Payne, with Cecil Payne, Clark Terry, Bennie Green, Duke Jordan, Ron Carter and Charlie Persip, Recorded 14, 15, 16 March 1962 - Charlie Parker Records PLP 806

Other productions

- London, 1960
- European Tour, 1962: Italy, France, Germany, Switzerland, Sweden, Belgium, Denmark, The Netherlands
- London, 1974, at Hampstead Theatre Club with Bill Wallis, John Ratzenberger, Harry Ditson, Mark Russel, Richard Moore, and Philip Hinton. Directed by Michael Rudman
- New York, 1981, with Morgan Freeman as Cowboy
- Chicago, 1992, the inaugural production of A Red Orchid Theatre, featuring Michael Shannon and Guy Van Swearingen
- New York, 2009, 50th Anniversary Production at the Living Theatre, directed by Judith Malina, music director Rene McLean
- Seattle, 2011, Sight by Sound productions, directed by Gavin Reub in The Little Theater
