= Warren Finnerty =

American actor (1925–1974)

- Born: April 9, 1925
- Died: December 22, 1974 (aged 49); New York City, U.S.

Warren Finnerty (April 9, 1925 – December 22, 1974) was an American actor best known for his Obie award-winning performance as the character "Leach" in the stage production The Connection (1959) and its film adaptation.

== Career ==
After making his film debut in Murder, Inc. (1960) and the Off-Off Broadway production of The Brig in the 1960s, he made a few television appearances before starring in The Connection (1961), the film adaptation of the play in which he reprised his stage role.

He continued to work steadily in the 1960s and early 1970s, making appearances on television in Bonanza and Banacek, and in films such as The Pawnbroker (1964), Cool Hand Luke (1967), Easy Rider (1969) in which Finnerty plays a rancher whose lifestyle draws the admiration of Wyatt aka "Captain America," the character played by Peter Fonda, The Panic in Needle Park (1971), Kid Blue (1973) and Cockfighter (1974).

Finnerty died in 1974 in New York City from a heart attack at the age of 49.

== Family ==
Finnerty's wife, Ruth, was a pianist and English educator at UC Berkeley Extension; the couple's son is the jazz musician Barry Finnerty.

== Filmography ==
Year	Title	Role	Notes
1960	Murder, Inc.	Charles "The Bug" Workman	
1961	The Connection	Leach	
1964	The Pawnbroker	Savarese	
1964	The Brig	Guard #1	
1965	Andy	Sanovich	
1967	Who's Crazy?	Unknown	
1967	Cool Hand Luke	"Tattoo"	
1969	Easy Rider	The Rancher	
1969	Marlowe	The Manager	Uncredited
1969	Scream Free!	Barney	
1971	The Panic in Needle Park	Sammy	
1971	The Last Movie	Banker	
1973	Kid Blue	Wills	
1973	The Laughing Policeman	Ripple	
1974	Cockfighter	Sanders	
1974	Injun fender	The Texan	(final film role)
