= The Music from "The Connection" =

Soundtrack album / studio album by the Freddie Redd Quartet with Jackie McLean
- Released: Early April 1960
- Recorded: February 15, 1960
- Studio: Van Gelder Studio; Englewood Cliffs, New Jersey
- Genre: Hard bop
- Label: Blue Note; BLP 4027
- Producer: Alfred Lion

Freddie Redd chronology
Get Happy with Freddie Redd (1958)	The Music from "The Connection" (1960)	Music from the Connection (1960)

Professional ratings
Review scores
Source	Rating
AllMusic	4.5/5 stars
The Penguin Guide to Jazz Recordings	3.5/4 stars

The Music from "The Connection" is an album by the Freddie Redd Quartet, recorded as the soundtrack for Jack Gelber's 1959 play The Connection on February 15, 1960 and released on Blue Note later that year. The quartet features saxophonist Jackie McLean and rhythm section Michael Mattos and Larry Ritchie.

== Background ==
Jack Gelber originally planned for the play to feature improvised music performed by jazz musicians who would also play small roles in the production. Freddie Redd however persuaded Gelber to include his original score. Redd recorded his score again later in 1960 as Music from the Connection.

== Track listing ==
All compositions by Freddie Redd

=== Side 1 ===
1. "Who Killed Cock Robin" – 5:21
2. "Wigglin'" – 5:58
3. "Music Forever" – 5:52

=== Side 2 ===
1. "Time To Smile" – 6:24
2. "(Theme for) Sister Salvation" – 4:43
3. "Jim Dunn's Dilemma" – 5:37
4. "O.D. (Overdose)" – 4:41

== Personnel ==
=== Freddie Redd Quartet ===
- Jackie McLean – alto saxophone
- Freddie Redd – piano
- Michael Mattos – bass
- Larry Ritchie – drums

=== Technical personnel ===
- Alfred Lion – production
- Rudy Van Gelder – recording engineer, mastering
- Reid Miles – design
- Herb Snitzer – photography
- Ira Gitler – liner notes
