= Howard McGhee =

American jazz trumpeter (1918–1987)

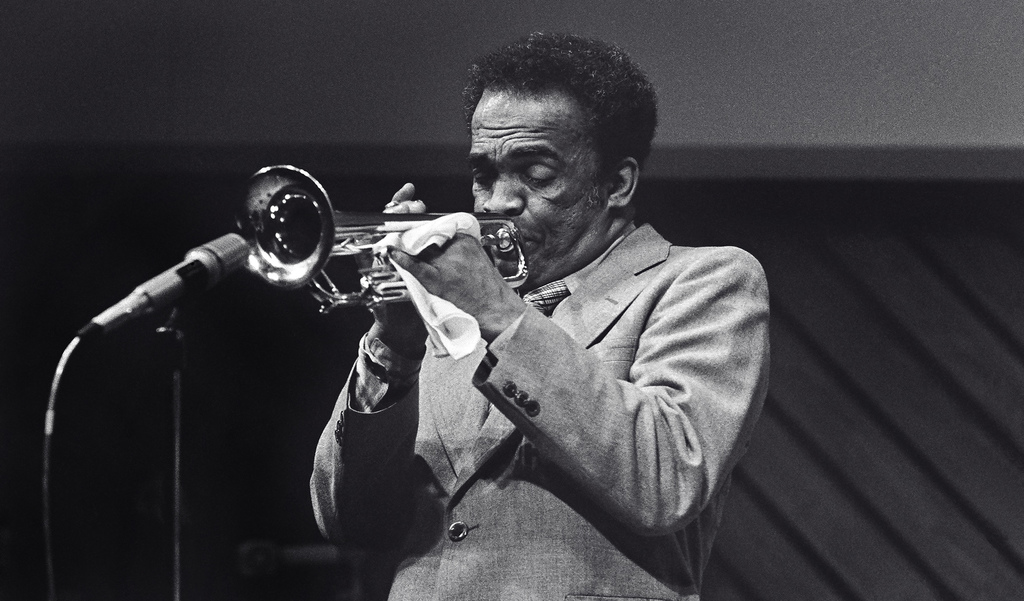
- McGhee in Rochester, New York, 1976

Background information
- Born: March 6, 1918; Tulsa, Oklahoma, U.S.
- Died: July 17, 1987 (aged 69) New York City, U.S.
- Genres: Jazz
- Occupation: Musician
- Instrument: Trumpet
- Years active: early-1940s – late-1970s
- Labels: Dial; Savoy; Bethlehem; Contemporary

Howard McGhee (March 6, 1918 – July 17, 1987) was one of the first American bebop jazz trumpeters, alongside Dizzy Gillespie, Fats Navarro, and Idrees Sulieman. He was known for his fast fingering and high notes. He had an influence on younger bebop trumpeters such as Navarro.

== Biography ==
Howard McGhee was born in Tulsa, Oklahoma, United States, and raised in Detroit, Michigan.

During his career, he played in bands led by Lionel Hampton, Andy Kirk, Count Basie, and Charlie Barnet. He was in a club listening to the radio when he first heard Charlie Parker and was one of the earliest adopters of the new style.

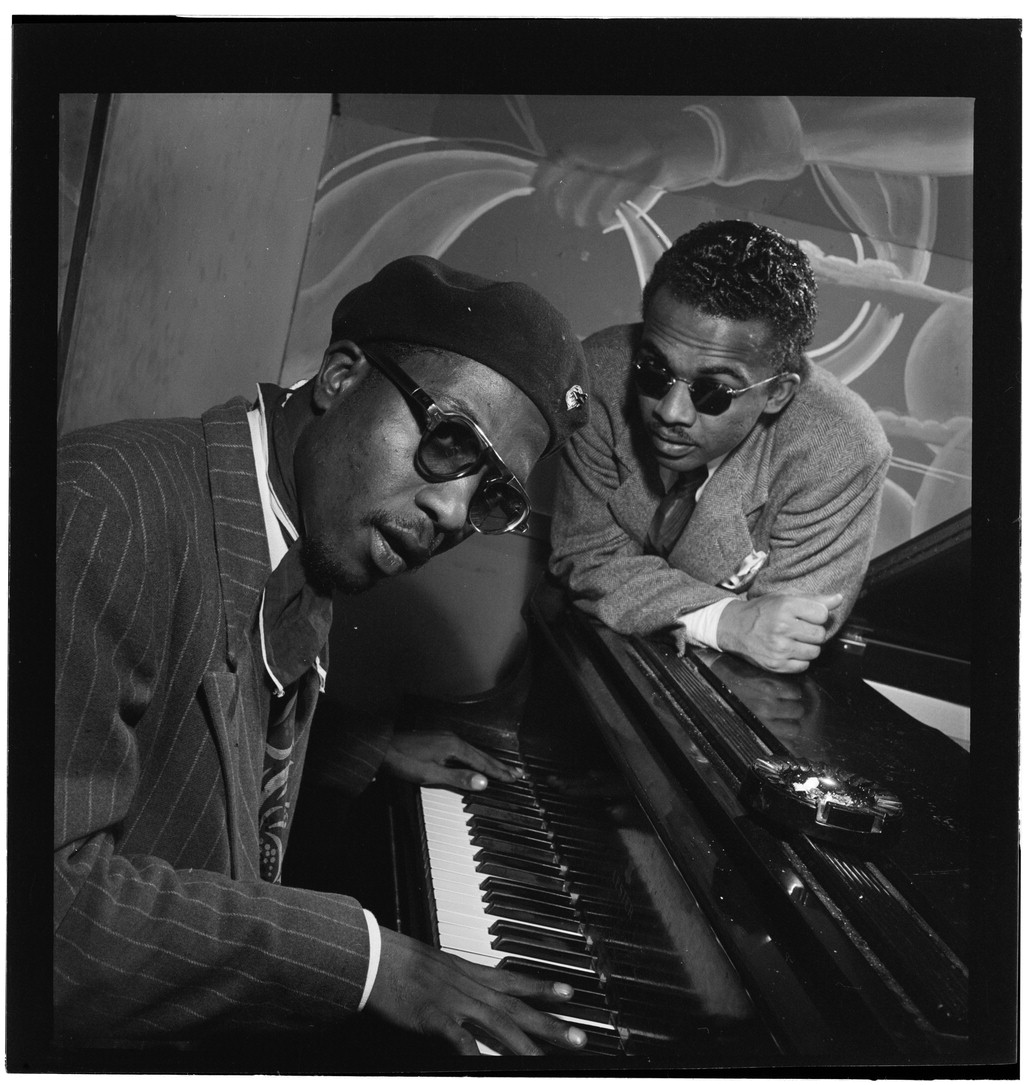
McGhee (right) and Thelonious Monk, Minton's Playhouse, c. September 1947

In 1946–47, some record sessions for the new label Dial were organized in Hollywood, with Charlie Parker and McGhee. The first was held on July 29, 1946; the musicians were Charlie Parker, Howard McGhee, Jimmy Bunn, Bob Kesterson, and Roy Porter. With Parker's health near to collapse, he played "Max is Making Wax", "Lover Man", and "The Gypsy".

McGhee continued to work as a sideman with Parker. He played on titles such as "Relaxin' at Camarillo", "Cheers", "Carvin' the Bird" and "Stupendous". Around this time, McGhee was a leading musician in the Los Angeles bebop scene, participating in many concerts, recordings, and even managing a night club for a brief period. His stay in California ended because of racial prejudice, particularly vicious towards McGhee as half of a mixed-race couple.

Drug problems sidelined McGhee for much of the 1950s, but he resurfaced in the 1960s, appearing in many George Wein productions. His career sputtered again in the mid-1960s and he did not record again until 1976. He led one of three jazz big bands trying to succeed in New York in the late 1960s. While the band did not survive, a recording was released in the mid-1970s.

He taught music through the 1970s, both in classrooms and at his apartment in midtown Manhattan, and instructed musicians like Charlie Rouse in music theory. He was as much an accomplished composer-arranger as he was a performer.

McGhee died on July 17, 1987, at the age of 69; a memorial service was held for him on July 24, 1987.

== Discography ==
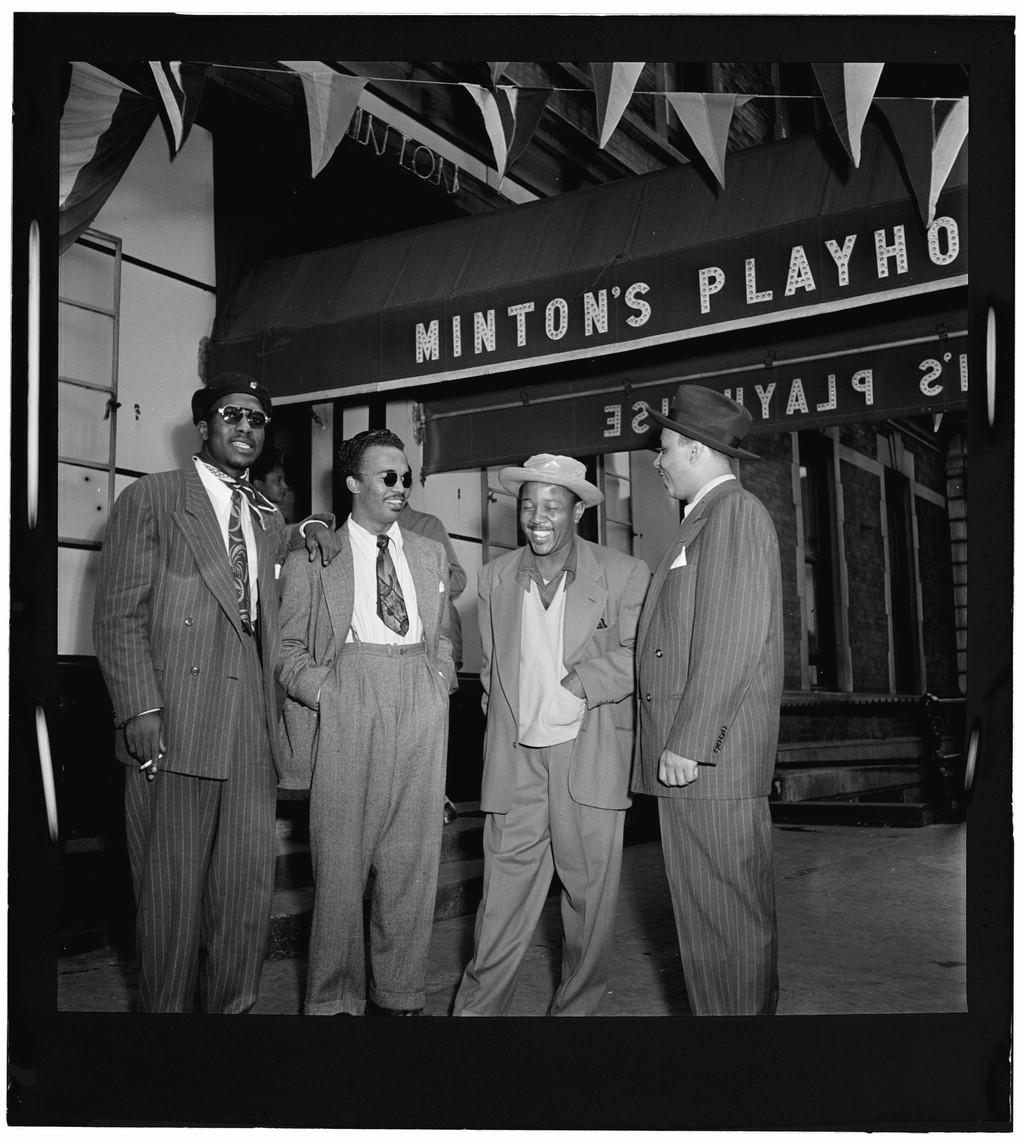
(From left) Thelonious Monk, Howard McGhee, Roy Eldridge, Teddy Hill, Minton's Playhouse, New York City, c. September 1947

=== As leader/co-leader ===
- 1946–47: Night Music (Dial [10"], 1951) with Hank Jones, Milt Jackson, James Moody, Dodo Marmarosa
- 1946–47: Trumpet at Tempo (The Complete Dial Sessions) (Spotlite, 1976; CD reissue: Jazz Classics, 1996)
- 1948: Howard McGhee and Milt Jackson (Savoy, 1955)
- 1948: Be Bop (Atlantic [10"], 1952) with Jimmy Heath, Percy Heath
- 1950: Howard McGhee (Blue Note [10"], 1952) with Fats Navarro
- 1952: Jazz Goes to the Battle Front, Volume 1 (Hi-Lo [10"])
- 1952: Jazz Goes to the Battle Front, Volume 2 (Hi-Lo [10"])
- 1953: Howard McGhee, Vol. 2 (Blue Note [10"]) with Gigi Gryce
- 1955: The Return of Howard McGhee (Bethlehem) [a.k.a. That Bop Thing]
- 1956: Life Is Just a Bowl of Cherries (Bethlehem)
- 1956: Jazz South Pacific (Regent) with J. J. Johnson, Oscar Pettiford; reissues the Hi-Lo material
- 1960: Dusty Blue (Bethlehem)
- 1960: Music from the Connection (Felsted)
- 1961: Together Again!!!! (Contemporary) with Teddy Edwards
- 1961: Maggie's Back in Town!! (Contemporary)
- 1961: The Sharp Edge (Fontana) [a.k.a. Shades of Blue]
- 1962: Nobody Knows You When You're Down and Out (United Artists)
- 1963: House Warmin'! (Argo); originally issued in 1962 on Winley Records as Nothin' But Soul under Gene Ammons's name.
- 1976: Here Comes Freddy (Sonet) with Illinois Jacquet
- 1976: Just Be There (SteepleChase) with Horace Parlan, Kenny Clarke
- 1977: Cookin' Time, Howard McGhee Orchestra (Zim Records)
- 1978: Live at Emerson's, Howard McGhee Sextet (Zim Records)
- 1978: Jazz Brothers (Jazzcraft) with Charlie Rouse
- 1978: Home Run (Jazzcraft) with Benny Bailey
- 1979: Young at Heart (Storyville) with Teddy Edwards
- 1979: Wise in Time (Storyville) with Teddy Edwards

=== As sideman ===
With Lorez Alexandria

- Deep Roots (Argo, 1962)

With Georgie Auld

- Rainbow Mist (Delmark, 1944 [1992]); compilation of Apollo recordings

With Billy Eckstine

- Maggie: The Savoy Sessions (Savoy, 1947 [1995]); includes the infamous Eckstine/McGhee four song session, originally recorded in Chicago for Vitacoustic Records; personnel: Howard McGhee (tp), Billy Eckstine (vtb), Kenny Mann (ts), Hank Jones (p), Ray Brown (b), J. C. Heard (d), Marcel Daniels (v).

With Johnny Hartman

- Songs from the Heart (Bethlehem, 1955)
- All of Me: The Debonair Mr. Hartman (Bethlehem, 1956)

With Coleman Hawkins

- Hollywood Stampede (Capitol, 1945 [1972])
- Disorder at the Border (Spotlite, 1952 [1973])

With Chubby Jackson

- Chubby Jackson's All Stars (Prestige [7" EP], 1950 [1954])
- Chubby Jackson Sextet and Big Band (Prestige, 1947–50 [1969])

With James Moody

- James Moody, His Saxophone and His Band (Dial [10"], 1947 [1950])
- Cookin' the Blues [live] (Argo, 1961 [1964])

With André Previn

- André Previn All-Stars (Monarch, 1946)
- Previn at Sunset (Polydor, 1972)

With Mel Tormé

- George Gershwin's Porgy and Bess (Bethlehem, 1956) with Frances Faye
- At the Crescendo (Bethlehem, 1957)
- Songs for Any Taste (Bethlehem, 1957)

=== With others ===
- 1954: Billie Holiday, Billie Holiday at Jazz at the Philharmonic (Clef) – rec. 1945–1946
- 1956: Wardell Gray, Way Out Wardell (Modern)
- 1960: Freddie Redd, The Music from "The Connection" (Blue Note)
- 1962: Johnny Hodges, Johnny Hodges with Billy Strayhorn and the Orchestra (Verve)
- 1962: Zoot Sims, Good Old Zoot (New Jazz)
- 1963: Phil Porter, Introducing Phil Porter and His Organ (United Artists)
- 1963: Joe Williams, At Newport '63 (RCA Victor)
- 1967: Newport Parker Tribute All Stars, Tribute To Charlie Parker (From The Newport Jazz Festival) (RCA Victor) – rec. 1964
- 1968: Don Patterson, Boppin' & Burnin' (Prestige)
- 1969: Phil Woods, Early Quintets (Prestige) – rec. 1959
- 1976: Gene Ammons, Red Top: The Savoy Sessions 1947–1953 (Savoy)
- 1976: Eddie Jefferson, The Jazz Singer (Inner City) – rec. 1959–1961
- 1989: Sonny Stitt, Autumn in New York (Black Lion) – rec. 1967
- 1991: Sonny Criss, California Boppin' 1947 (Fresh Sound)
- 1993: Andy Kirk & His Clouds of Joy, The Chronological...1940–1942 (Classics)
- 1995: Dodo Marmarosa, Dodo Marmarosa On Dial: The Complete Sessions 1946–1947 (Spotlite)
- 1996: Wynonie Harris, The Chronological...1944–1945 (Classics)
- 1996: Slim Gaillard The Chronological...1945 (Classics)
