= Music from the Connection =

Music from "The Connection"

Studio album by Howard McGhee Quintet with Freddie Redd
- Released: 1960
- Recorded: June 13, 1960
- Studio: Bell Sound (New York City)
- Genre: Jazz
- Length: 29:11
- Label: Felsted; FL-7512
- Producer: Alan Lorber, Ernest Kelley

Howard McGhee chronology
Dusty Blue (1960)	Music from "The Connection" (1960)	Together Again!!!! (1961)

Freddie Redd chronology
The Music From The Connection (1960)	Music from "The Connection" (1960)	Shades of Redd (1960)

Music from The Connection is a jazz album by trumpeter Howard McGhee recorded on June 13, 1960, and released on the Felsted label. It features performances by McGhee, Tina Brooks, Freddie Redd, Milt Hinton and Osie Johnson. The album featured music from the off-Broadway play The Connection by Jack Gelber, featuring music composed by Redd. A slightly earlier recording of the same score by the Freddie Redd Quartet with Jackie McLean, The Music From "The Connection", was issued by Blue Note.

Professional ratings
Review scores
Source	Rating
Allmusic	3/5 stars

== Track listing ==
All compositions by Freddie Redd

Side-A

1. "Who Killed Cock Robin?" - 4:25
2. "Wigglin'" - 4:52
3. "Music Forever" - 3:46
4. "Time to Smile" - 3:53

Side-B

1. "(Theme for) Sister Salvation" - 4:36
2. "Jim Dunn's Dilemma" - 3:57
3. "O.D. (Overdose)" - 3:42

== Personnel ==
- Howard McGhee - trumpet
- Freddie Redd - piano (originally credited to "I. Ching")
- Tina Brooks - tenor saxophone
- Milt Hinton - bass
- Osie Johnson - drums
