= Lewis M. Allen =

American film producer (1922–2003)

- Born: Lewis Maitland Allen; June 27, 1922; Berryville, Virginia, U.S.
- Died: December 8, 2003 (aged 81); New York City, New York, U.S.
- Occupation(s): Film producer, theatre producer

Lewis Maitland Allen (June 27, 1922 Berryville, Virginia – December 8, 2003 New York City) was an American film producer and Tony Award winning Broadway producer. He was married to screenwriter Jay Presson Allen. Allen was nominated for seven Tony Awards and won three, for Annie (1977), I'm Not Rappaport (1986) and Master Class (1996).

On Broadway, he was renowned for producing Annie and Master Class and in film he produced versions of The Connection (1961), and Fahrenheit 451 (1966), Swimming to Cambodia (1987), plus both English language versions of Lord of the Flies released in 1963 and 1990.
