= Redd's Blues =

Studio album by Freddie Redd
- Released: 1988 (Mosaic Records); 2002 (Blue Note Records)
- Recorded: January 17, 1961
- Studio: Rudy Van Gelder Studio, Englewood Cliffs, New Jersey
- Genre: Jazz
- Length: 38:36
- Label: Blue Note
- Producer: Alfred Lion

Freddie Redd chronology
Extemporaneous (1978)	Redd's Blues (1988)	Lonely City (1989)

== Background ==
The 1961 session was initially released as part of the Mosaic Records 2-CD release, The Complete Blue Note Recordings of Freddie Redd, which chronicled Redd’s three Blue Note Records sessions, 1960-61. That this set was released early in Moasic’s lineage (MR3-124; 1988) suggests the significance of Redd’s Blue Note recordings.

In 1956 Redd was hired by Charles Mingus. It’s easy to see why Mingus would have hired Redd: both had an inherent knack for tuneful melodies and appointed harmonic support. However, according to Will Thornbury’s Mosaic liner notes, Redd admitted that he had misgivings about working for Mingus given Mingus’ dictatorial approach to rehearsing. Redd further offered: "Charlie and I hassled a lot on the road. He wanted us (to) do things his way without questioning. I couldn’t be dutiful in that sense". To further underscore the emerging animosity, Redd explained how Mingus’ drummer, Dannie Richmond, had warned Redd that Mingus had hatched a plan to abandon him at the conclusion of their tour when returning to New York. According to the story, Richmond told Redd: "I think The Ming has something planned for you…when we’re driving through, say, New Mexico, he’s going to ask you 'Freddie, you want to check the right rear tire?’, and leave you out in the desert!"

Unfortunately, as both men were clearly self-willed leaders any chance of a long-term partnership was notably limited and Redd’s own self-driven approach would subsequently impact the proceedings at the recording session for his third Blue Note date.

== The Session: 17JAN1961 ==
In 1960 Redd had secured a 3-LP deal from Al Lion at Blue Note Records. The first two releases were recorded in 1960, released in succession, and were both met with overall favourable critique.

Of the third session, Thornbury’s interview notes indicate that Redd had not fully rehearsed the group with his six charts and was using recording time at Van Gelder’s studio to further work out the arrangements, which ultimately angered Lion.

Apparently sometime prior to the recording session, Redd had a chance meeting with trumpeter, Benny Bailey, and on-the-spot asked him to join the group on the upcoming session. Thornbury’s interview notes suggest a scenario where Bailey was added after the formal (Blue Note paid) rehearsal — suggesting that Redd would have had to re-write the six arrangements to incorporate a third horn in the front line — and showed up at Van Galder’s with Redd walking him (and the band) through a newly added 3rd-horn part. Unfortunately, this ended up using valuable studio time to rehearse and/or re-work his arrangements. This understandably irritated Al Lion and resulted in escalating tension to the point that upon conclusion of the session, Lion told Redd he would not release the date.

Reviewing the Mosaic set discography appears to indicate that Redd’s piece, "Now", may have required seven attempts — suggesting some order of difficulty with its recording in particular; indeed, it features some intense, though brief, three-part harmony. It’s interesting to note that although Lion and Redd were in conflict with each other, this didn’t appear to aurally impact the other musicians: the date’s most jovial and spirited performance, "Cute Dute", was the last piece to be cut — apparently only requiring two takes at that.

== The Music ==
The session gives us a unique opportunity to hear the marvellous Tina Brooks, an excellent tenor player whose recorded career was all too brief, as well as the innovative and singular Jackie McLean — both of whom are playing with solid conviction; and as an added bonus, Benny Bailey brings his highly imaginative and rock-solid trumpet playing skills to the date.

The first selection, "Now", is an intriguing descending chromatic minor figure arranged and played with a penetrating sense of urgency indicative of the early '60s hard bop-to-post bop transition period. The solos do well to further showcase the impressive melodic talents of Brooks and McLean. The next selection, "Cute Doot", is the perfect foil with its carefree and instantly affable melody, supporting and equally buoyant polyrhythmic harmonies, and infectious danceable latin rhythm…and so it goes for the balance of the LP: six distinctive jazz sides of Redd’s most fertile musical period, as explained by Ben Sidran.

Of the LP, David Johnson stated: "Heard today (in 2019), it stands up as another high level example of Freddie Redd’s abilities as a composer, and of Blue Note’s hardbop house sound, even on a day when the producer and the date’s leader were at odds".

== Releases And Reception ==
Professional ratings
Review scores
Source	Rating
AllMusic	2/5 stars
The Penguin Guide to Jazz Recordings	2.5/4 stars

The sessions were recorded in 1961, but not released until 1988 by Mosaic Records (as part of their 2-CD set, The Complete Blue Note Recordings of Freddie Redd); and further released as a single CD (and titled Redd’s Blues) by Blue Note Records in 2002.

== Track listing ==
All compositions by Freddie Redd

1. "Now" - 7:15
2. "Cute Doot" - 6:17
3. "Old Spice" - 7:04
4. "Blues for Betsy" - 5:02
5. "Somewhere" - 5:56
6. "Love Lost" - 7:12

- Recorded at Rudy Van Gelder Studio, Englewood Cliffs, New Jersey, on January 17, 1961.

== Personnel ==
- Freddie Redd - piano
- Benny Bailey - trumpet
- Jackie McLean - alto saxophone
- Tina Brooks - tenor saxophone
- Paul Chambers - double bass
- Sir John Godfrey - drum kit
