= The Connection (1961 film) =

1961 film by Shirley Clarke

- Directed by: Shirley Clarke
- Written by: Jack Gelber
- Based on: The Connection; 1959 play by Jack Gelber
- Produced by: Lewis M. Allen; Shirley Clarke
- Starring: Warren Finnerty; William Redfield
- Cinematography: Arthur J. Ornitz
- Edited by: Shirley Clarke
- Music by: Freddie Redd
- Production companies: The Connection Company; Allen-Hodgson Productions
- Distributed by: Films Around the World
- Release dates: May 1961 (Cannes); July 1961 (Locarno); August 1961 (Venice); 15 February 1962 (Scottsdale); 3 October 1962 (New York City); 11 February 2012 (Berlin)
- Running time: 110 minutes
- Country: United States
- Language: English
- Budget: $170,000

The Connection is a 1961 feature film directed by the American experimental filmmaker Shirley Clarke. The film was Clarke's first feature; she had made several short films over the previous decade. Jack Gelber wrote the screenplay, adapting his play of the same name. The film was the subject of significant court cases regarding censorship. It is the first known movie shot in the found footage format and beginning with a found footage title card.

== Plot ==
A title card announces that the film is a result of found footage assembled by cameraman J.J. Burden (Roscoe Lee Browne) working for the acclaimed documentary filmmaker Jim Dunn (William Redfield), who has disappeared.

Leach (Warren Finnerty), a heroin addict, introduces the audience to his apartment where other heroin addicts, a mix of current and former jazz musicians, are waiting for Cowboy (Carl Lee), their drug connection, to appear. As the men grow increasingly nervous, waiting for their fix, some of them start to address the camera directly. Although director Jim Dunn asks his camera operator J.J. to turn off the camera, J.J. films him coaching the junkies to "act natural" and revealing where the microphones and lights are hidden in the apartment. Furthermore, Jim reveals that he is the one who has given the addicts the money for their heroin in exchange for being able to film them.

Jim, who is nervous around the junkies, confesses a private hope that he will be able to film the connection behind the connection. The junkies shoot down this idea and suggest it would be more interesting to watch Jim take heroin. J.J. suggests that Jim start with marijuana, which Leach finds amusing and does not even have.

Cowboy finally arrives, bringing with him an older woman called Sister Salvation who has no idea what they are up to. The men shoot up one by one in the bathroom.

Under pressure from the other men, who claim Jim is exploiting them, Jim agrees to try heroin. He almost immediately becomes ill from the effects, which are much stronger on him than on the others. Despite this, Jim continues to film the others encouraging them to act more cinematic and telling Cowboy he once thought of making him the "hero" of his film.

Despite the fact that Cowboy injected Leach with heroin, Leach claims to not be high. Annoyed, Cowboy gives Leach the heroin and allows him to shoot up himself which he does in full view of J.J.

However, this final shot proves too much for Leach and Leach overdoses, but Cowboy manages to revive him & Leach continues to have a bad trip.

The men who are left wait for their next connection to show up. Meanwhile, Jim turns to J.J. and tells him that the film belongs to him and goes to join the other addicts in waiting.

== Cast ==
- Warren Finnerty as Leach
- Jerome Raphael as Solly
- Garry Goodrow as Ernie
- Jim Anderson as Sam
- Carl Lee as Cowboy
- Barbara Winchester as Sister Salvation
- Henry Proach as Harry
- Roscoe Lee Browne as J. J. Burden
- William Redfield as Jim Dunn
- Freddie Redd as Piano Player
- Jackie McLean as Sax Player
- Larry Richie as Drummer
- Michael Mattos as Bass Player

== Background ==
Based on the play The Connection by Jack Gelber, the film follows a young filmmaker who attempts to film junkies waiting for their heroin dealer to arrive.

Most of the actors from the original stage production reprised their roles for the film: Warren Finnerty as Leach, Carl Lee as Cowboy, Garry Goodrow as Ernie, Jerome Raphel as Solly, Barbara Winchester as Sister Salvation, and Henry Proach as Harry. All the musicians from the original stage production appeared: Freddie Redd (composer, piano), Jackie McLean (alto sax), Michael Mattos (bass), and Larry Ritchie (drums). Non-original cast members James Anderson and William Redfield took the roles of Sam and Jim Dunn. The character of Jaybird was cut from the film; that role essentially shifted to a largely off-screen camera operator, J.J. Burden, voiced by Roscoe Lee Browne. The music played on the onscreen record player is "Marmaduke" by and performed by Charlie Parker (take 4).

The film helped to loosen film censorship, as Clarke and producer Lewis Allen had filed suit to be able to show the film in New York. (The film had premiered at the Cannes Film Festival in 1961.) In that era, in New York, the State's Department of Education had a vote on the State's film licensing board, and they voted to deny a license, mainly on the grounds that the word "shit" was used repeatedly during the film even though it was mostly used to refer to drugs.

The case went to the New York State Court of Appeals (the state's highest court). The Court of Appeals affirmed the decision of the intermediate level Appellate Division, which had held that while 'vulgar', this usage could not be considered obscene. Ultimately, the film was unsuccessful at the box office.

== Restoration ==
On May 4, 2012, Milestone Films released a version of The Connection restored by the UCLA Film and Television Archive.
