= The Living Theatre =

American theatre company

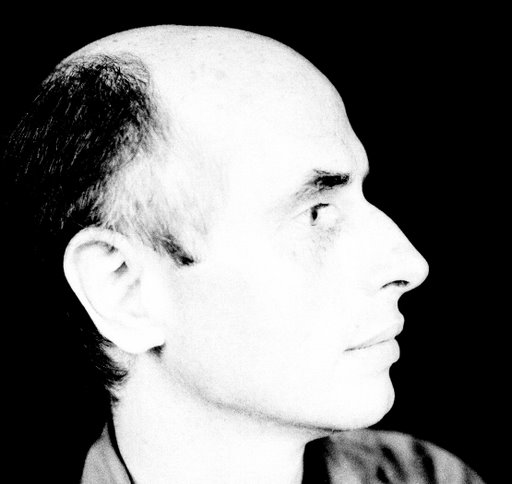
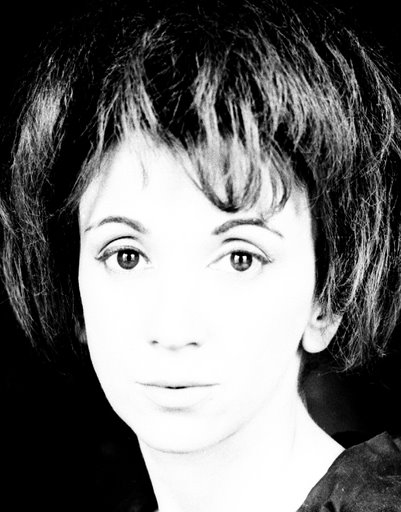
- Julian Beck (left) and Judith Malina founded The Living Theatre
- Formation: 1947
- Founders: Julian Beck (left) and Judith Malina
- Type: experimental theatre company
- Location: New York City
- Website: www.livingtheatre.org

The Living Theatre is an American theatre company founded in 1947 and based in New York City. It is the oldest experimental theatre group in the United States. For most of its history it was led by its founders, actress and director Judith Malina and painter/poet Julian Beck. After Beck's death in 1985, company member Hanon Reznikov became co-director with Malina; the two were married in 1988. After Malina's death in 2015, her responsibilities were taken over by her son Garrick Maxwell Beck, Tom Walker and Brad Burgess. The Living Theatre and its founders were the subject of the 1983 documentary Signals Through the Flames.

== History ==
In the 1950s, the group was among the first in the U.S. to produce the work of influential European playwrights such as Bertolt Brecht (In The Jungle of Cities in New York, 1960) and Jean Cocteau, as well as modernist poets such as T. S. Eliot and Gertrude Stein. One of their first major productions was Pablo Picasso's Desire Caught By the Tail; other early productions were Many Loves by William Carlos Williams and Luigi Pirandello's Tonight We Improvise.

Based in a variety of small New York locations which were frequently closed due to financial problems or conflicts with city authorities, they helped to originate off-off-Broadway and off-Broadway as significant forces in U.S. theater. Their work during this period shared some aspects of style and content with Beat Generation writers. Also during the 1950s, the American composer Alan Hovhaness worked closely with the Living Theatre, composing music for its productions. In 1959, their production of The Connection attracted national attention for its harsh portrayal of drug addiction and its equally harsh language. In the early 1960s the Living Theatre was host to avant-garde minimalist performances by artists including Simone Forti and Robert Morris.

The Brig (1963), an anti-authoritarian look at conditions in a Marine prison, was their last major production in New York before a tax dispute led to the closure of the theatre space and the brief imprisonment of Beck and Malina. Judith defended Julian at the IRS hearing dressed like Portia from The Merchant of Venice. For the rest of the 1960s, the group toured chiefly in Europe. They produced more politically and formally radical work carrying an anarchist and pacifist message, with the company members creating plays collectively and often living together. Major works from this period included the adaptations Antigone, Frankenstein, and Paradise Now, which became their best-known play. Paradise Now, a semi-improvisational piece involving audience participation, was notorious for a scene in which actors recited a list of social taboos that included nudity, while disrobing; this led to multiple arrests for indecent exposure.

The group returned to the U.S. in 1968 to tour Paradise Now, Antigone, Mysteries and Smaller Pieces, and Frankenstein. "That madman who inspires us all, Artaud, does have some advice," Beck said in an informal address at Yale University after his return, "and I think he is the philosopher, for those of us who work in theatre, whom we can reach toward most quickly, of whom we can say, yes, here is one man since Rousseau who does uphold the idea of the non-civilized man." He added: "Our work had always striven to stress the sacredness of life." In 1971 they toured in Brazil, where they were imprisoned for several months, then deported.

The Living Theatre has toured extensively throughout the world, often in non-traditional venues such as streets and prisons. It has greatly influenced other American experimental theatre companies, notably The Open Theater (founded by former Living Theatre member Joseph Chaikin) and Bread and Puppet Theater. The Living Theatre's productions have won four Obie Awards: The Connection (1959), The Brig (1963 and 2007), and Frankenstein (1968).

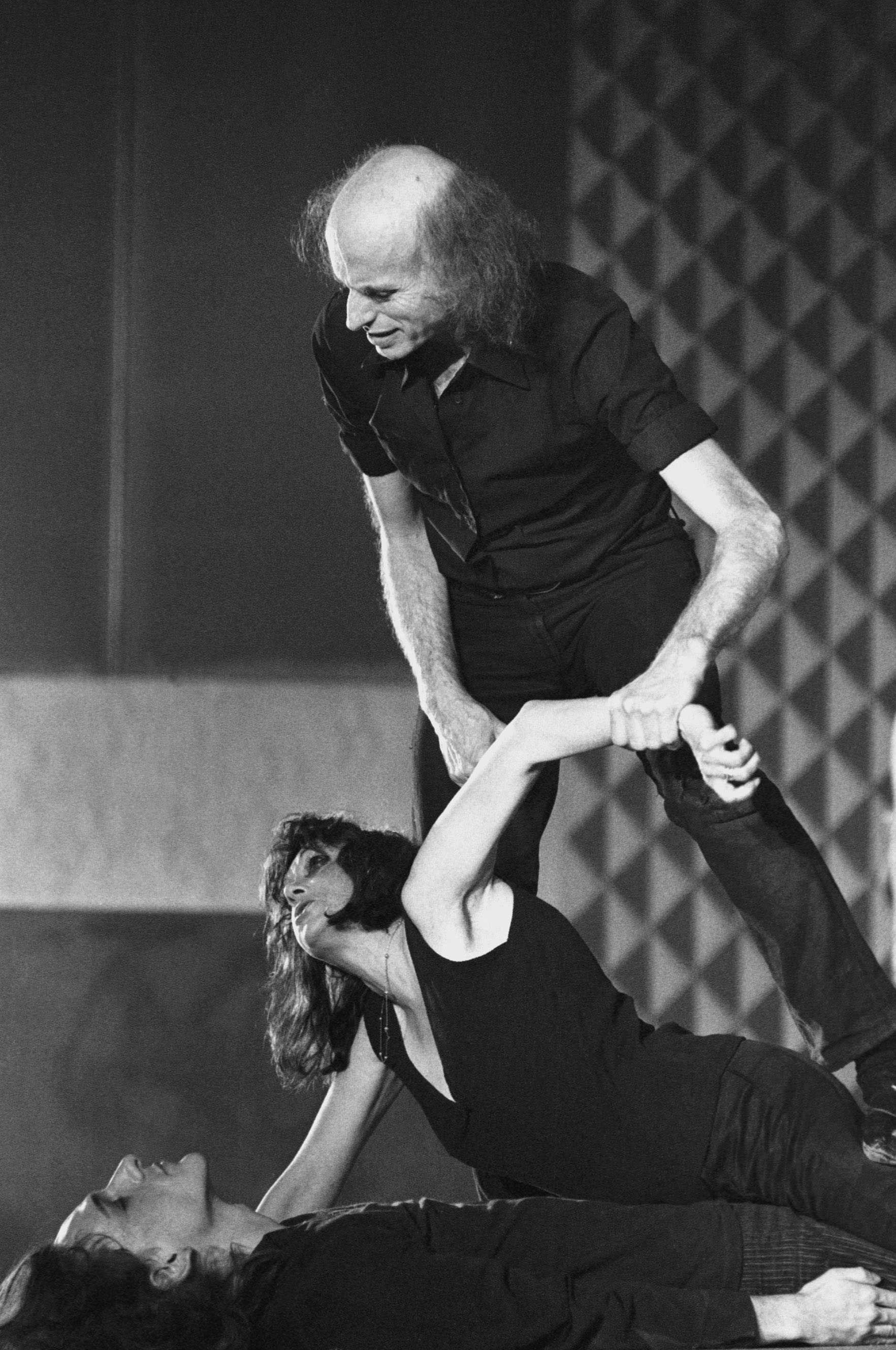
Julian Beck (top) and Judith Malina (middle) rehearsing at The Living Theatre

In 2006, The Living Theatre signed a 10-year lease on the 3,500-square-foot (330 m^{2}) basement of a new residential building under construction at 21 Clinton Street, between Houston and Stanton Streets on Manhattan's Lower East Side. The Clinton Street theater is the company's first permanent home since the closing of The Living Theatre on Third Street at Avenue C in 1993. The company moved into the completed space in early 2007 and opened in April 2007 with a revival of The Brig by Kenneth H. Brown, first presented at The Living Theatre at 14th Street and Sixth Avenue in 1963. The re-staging, directed by Judith Malina, won Obie Awards for Direction and Ensemble Performance.

In October 2006, the company opened a revival of Mysteries and Smaller Pieces, the 1964 collective creation that defined the interactive and Artaudian style for which the company became famous.

In late 2007 / early 2008 the company founder Judith Malina performed in Maudie and Jane, a stage adaptation, directed by Reznikov, of the Doris Lessing novel, The Diary of Jane Somers.

In April 2008, Hanon Reznikov suffered a stroke. He died on May 3, 2008.

In 2010, the company presented Red Noir, adapted and directed by Judith Malina. In 2011, the company presented Korach, by Malina, and a revival of Seven Meditations on Political Sado-Masochism, directed by Malina and Tom Walker. Also in 2011, the company created The Plot Is The Revolution, starring Malina and Silvia Calderoni, a co-production with the Italian group Motus. In 2012, the company presented The History of the World, written and directed by Malina. In 2013, the company presented Here We Are, written and directed by Malina. The company also vacated its Clinton Street space.

In 2014, Judith Malina's play No Place to Hide premiered at the Clemente Soto Velez Center on the Lower East Side. The production later took to the streets of New York for the Underground Zero Festival, and was performed at Burning Man. Malina was writing Venus and Mars when she died in April 2015.

== Goals and influences ==
From its conception, The Living Theatre was dedicated to transforming the organization of power within society from a competitive, hierarchical structure to cooperative and communal expression. The troupe attempts to do so by counteracting complacency in the audience through direct spectacle. They oppose the commercial orientation of Broadway productions and have contributed to the off-Broadway theater movement in New York City, staging poetic dramas.

The primary text for The Living Theatre is The Theatre and its Double, an anthology of essays written by Antonin Artaud, the French playwright. It was published in France in 1937 and by the Grove Press in the U.S. in 1958. This work deeply influenced Julian Beck, a bisexual painter of abstract expressionist works. The troupe reflects Artaud's influence by staging multimedia plays designed to exhibit his metaphysical Theatre of Cruelty. In these performances, the actors attempt to dissolve the "fourth wall" between them and the spectators.

== Plays and publications ==
- The Connection
- The Brig
- Mysteries
- Antigone (adaptation)
- Frankenstein
- Paradise Now
- The Living Book of the Living Theatre (1971)
- The Legacy of Cain (1970–1978)
- Turning the Earth
- Seven Meditations on Political Sado-Masochism
- Six Public Acts
- The Money Tower
- Prometheus at the Winter Palace (1978)
- The Antigone of Sophocles (1979)
- Masse Mensch (1980)
- The Yellow Methuselah (1982)
- The Archaeology of Sleep (1983)

== See also ==
- Stage works of Paul Goodman § The Living Theatre
- Lawrence Kornfeld

== Bibliography ==
- Neff, Renfrew (1970). The Living Theatre: U.S.A.
- Rostagno, Aldo, with Judith Malina and Julian Beck (1970). We, the Living Theatre. New York: Ballantine Books.
- The Living Theatre (1971). Paradise Now. New York: Random House.
- Malina, Judith (1972). The Enormous Despair. New York: Random House.
- Pierre Biner (1972) The Living Theatre New York: Avon Books.
- Malina, Judith (1984). The Diaries of Judith Malina, 1947-1957. New York: Grove Press, Inc.
- Mystic Fire Video (1989), Signals Through the Flames. Documentary. Originally released by The Living Theatre in 1983 as a motion picture, produced and directed by Sheldon Rochlin and Maxine Harris.
