= Julian Beck =

American actor, stage director, poet, and painter (1925–1985)

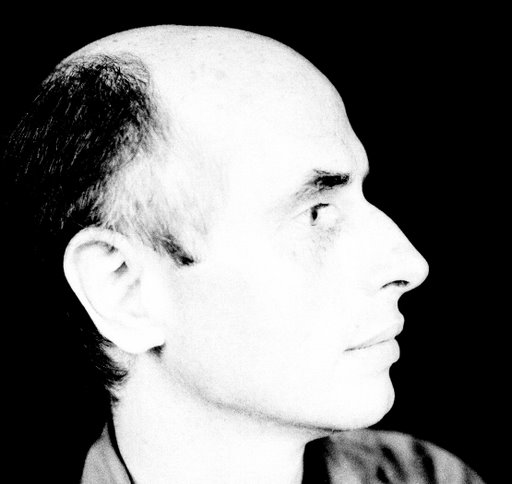
- Born: May 31, 1925; New York City, U.S.
- Died: September 14, 1985 (aged 60); New York City, U.S.
- Resting place: Cedar Park Cemetery, New Jersey
- Occupations: Actor; stage director; poet; painter
- Years active: 1943–1985
- Spouse: Judith Malina (m. 1948)
- Children: 2

Julian Beck (May 31, 1925 – September 14, 1985) was an American actor, stage director, poet, and painter. He is best known for co-founding and directing the Living Theatre, as well as his final role as Reverend Henry Kane, the malevolent preacher in the supernatural horror film Poltergeist II: The Other Side (1986)

== Early life ==
Beck was born on May 31, 1925, in the Washington Heights, Manhattan, to Mabel Lucille (née Blum), a teacher, and Irving Beck, a businessman. He was named after Julia Beck (née Blum), his mother's sister and his father's first wife, who had died in the influenza pandemic of 1918.

He briefly attended Yale University, but withdrew to pursue writing and art. He was an abstract expressionist painter in the 1940s, but his career turned upon meeting his future wife. In 1943, he met Judith Malina and quickly came to share her passion for theatre; they founded The Living Theatre in 1947.

== Career ==
Beck co-directed the Living Theatre until his death. The group's primary influence was Antonin Artaud, who espoused the Theatre of Cruelty, which was supposed to shock the audience out of complacency. This took different forms. In one example, from Jack Gelber's The Connection (1959), a drama about drug addiction, actors playing junkies wandered the audience demanding money for a fix. The Living Theatre moved out of New York in 1964, after the Internal Revenue Service (IRS) shut it down when Beck failed to pay $23,000 in back taxes. After a sensational trial in which Beck and Malina represented themselves, they were found guilty by a jury.

Beck's philosophy of theatre carried over into his life. He once said "We insisted on experimentation that was an image for a changing society. If one can experiment in theatre, one can experiment in life." He was indicted a dozen times on three continents for charges such as disorderly conduct, indecent exposure, possession of narcotics, and failure to participate in a civil defense drill.

Besides his theatre work, Beck published several volumes of poetry reflecting his anarchist beliefs; two non-fiction books: The Life of the Theatre and Theandric; and made several film appearances, with small roles in Oedipus Rex (1967), Love and Anger (1969), The Cotton Club (1984), and 9½ Weeks (1986). He had a role as the main antagonist in Poltergeist II: The Other Side (1986), which was released posthumously. Beck also appeared in an episode of Miami Vice that aired 13 days after his death.

== Personal life ==
Beck and Malina had an open marriage, and Beck had a long-term relationship with Ilion Troya, a male actor in the company. Malina and Beck shared a lover in Lester Schwartz, a shipyard worker who was the third husband of Andy Warhol acolyte Dorothy Podber. Beck and Malina had two children, Garrick and Isha.

=== Death ===
Beck was diagnosed with stomach cancer in late 1983, and he died two years later on September 14, 1985, at Mount Sinai Hospital in New York City, aged 60.

In 2004, 19 years after his death, Beck was inducted into the American Theater Hall of Fame. Judith Malina was inducted to the Hall of Fame the same year.

== Filmography ==
- Narcissus (1958) – Narration (voice)
- The Queen of Sheba Meets the Atom Man (1963)
- Oedipus Rex (1967) – Tiresia
- Après la Passion selon Sade (1968)
- Candy (1968)
- Love and Anger (1969) – Dying Man (segment "Agonia")
- Signals Through the Flames (1983), a documentary about The Living Theatre.
- The Cotton Club (1984) – Sol Weinstein
- Miami Vice (1985) – J.B. Johnston ("Prodigal Son" episode)
- 9½ Weeks (1986) – Dinner Guest (posthumous release)
- Poltergeist II: The Other Side (1986) – Rev. Henry Kane (posthumous release)
