= Judith Malina =

American actress, writer and director (1926–2015)

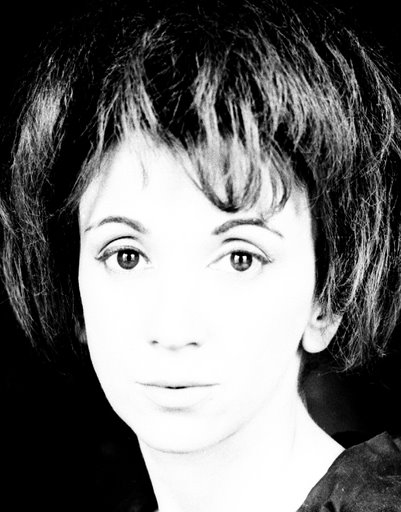
- Born: June 4, 1926; Kiel, Province of Schleswig-Holstein, Weimar Republic
- Died: April 10, 2015 (aged 88); Englewood, New Jersey, U.S.
- Resting place: Cedar Park Cemetery, New Jersey
- Citizenship: American
- Education: The New School for Social Research
- Occupations: Actress, director, writer
- Years active: 1942–2013
- Known for: Co-founding The Living Theatre
- Spouses: Julian Beck (m. 1948; died 1985) Hanon Reznikov (m. 1988; died 2008)

Judith Malina (June 4, 1926 – April 10, 2015) was an American actress, director and writer. With her husband Julian Beck, Malina co-founded The Living Theatre, a radical political theatre troupe that rose to prominence in New York City and Paris during the 1950s and 1960s.

== Early life and education ==
Malina was born in Kiel, Weimar Germany, the daughter of Polish Jewish parents: her mother, Rosel (née Zamora), was a former actress, and her father, Max Malina, a rabbi in the conservative denomination. In 1929, at the age of 3, she immigrated with her parents to New York City.

Malina's parents influenced her deeply, leading her to find an interest in political theatre, as her father left Germany with his family, largely due to the rise of antisemitism in the late 1920s, after attempting to warn people of the threat posed by Nazism.

From 1943 until 1945, Malina worked for Valeska Gert at the Beggar Bar. There she observed many of Gert's performances which influenced her later artistic approach. Interested in acting from an early age, she began attending the New School for Social Research in 1945 to study theatre under Erwin Piscator. Malina was greatly influenced by Piscator's philosophy of theatre. Piscator saw theatre as a form of political communication or agitprop ("Theatre interests me only when it is a matter of interest to society."). Malina, unlike Piscator, was committed to nonviolence and anarchism.

== Career ==
In 1947, Malina and her husband Julian Beck opened The Living Theatre, an experimental theatre company that focused on producing unconventional works by both American and European authors. By 1963, all three of the Living Theatre venues in New York had been shut down by authorities, in one instance by the IRS due to a tax dispute. The organization attributes this to "the difficulty of operating a unique, experimental enterprise within a cultural establishment ill-equipped to accept it", though the group returned to the United States in 1968.

Malina appeared occasionally in films, beginning in 1975, when she played Al Pacino's mother in Dog Day Afternoon. Using her for the role was Pacino's idea, said its director Sidney Lumet. Lumet recalled that contacting her was difficult because she had moved to Vermont. "I had no idea of what to expect," said Lumet. "I didn't even know whether she'd want to do a 'commercial' film. Well, let me tell you, she is an actress. Totally professional. She also had no money, and we had to pay her fare from Vermont, but she walked in and was perfect."

She also appeared in Pacino's Looking for Richard. Malina's other roles in cinema include Rose in Awakenings (1990) and Granny in The Addams Family (1991). She had major roles in Household Saints (1993) and the low-budget film Nothing Really Happens (2003). She appeared in an episode of the TV series The Sopranos in 2006 as a nun, the secret mother of Paulie "Walnuts" Gualtieri. She also has a significant supporting role in the film Enemies, A Love Story (1989), based on the novel by Isaac Bashevis Singer. The Living Theatre and its founders were the subject of the 1983 documentary Signals Through The Flames.

Malina is the subject of the documentary Love and Politics (2012) by Azad Jafarian and took part in Rosa von Praunheim's documentary New York Memories (2010). Von Praunheim's film premiered at the Berlin International Film Festival in 2010 and Jafarian's premiered in 2012 at the Tribeca Film Festival.

Theater scholar Richard Schechner said:

The thing about Judith Malina is that she is indefatigable, unstoppable, erupting with ideas. Malina is long-living, long-working, optimistic, and by the second decade of the 21st century girlish and old womanish at the same time. She survives and she bubbles, both.

== Personal life and death ==
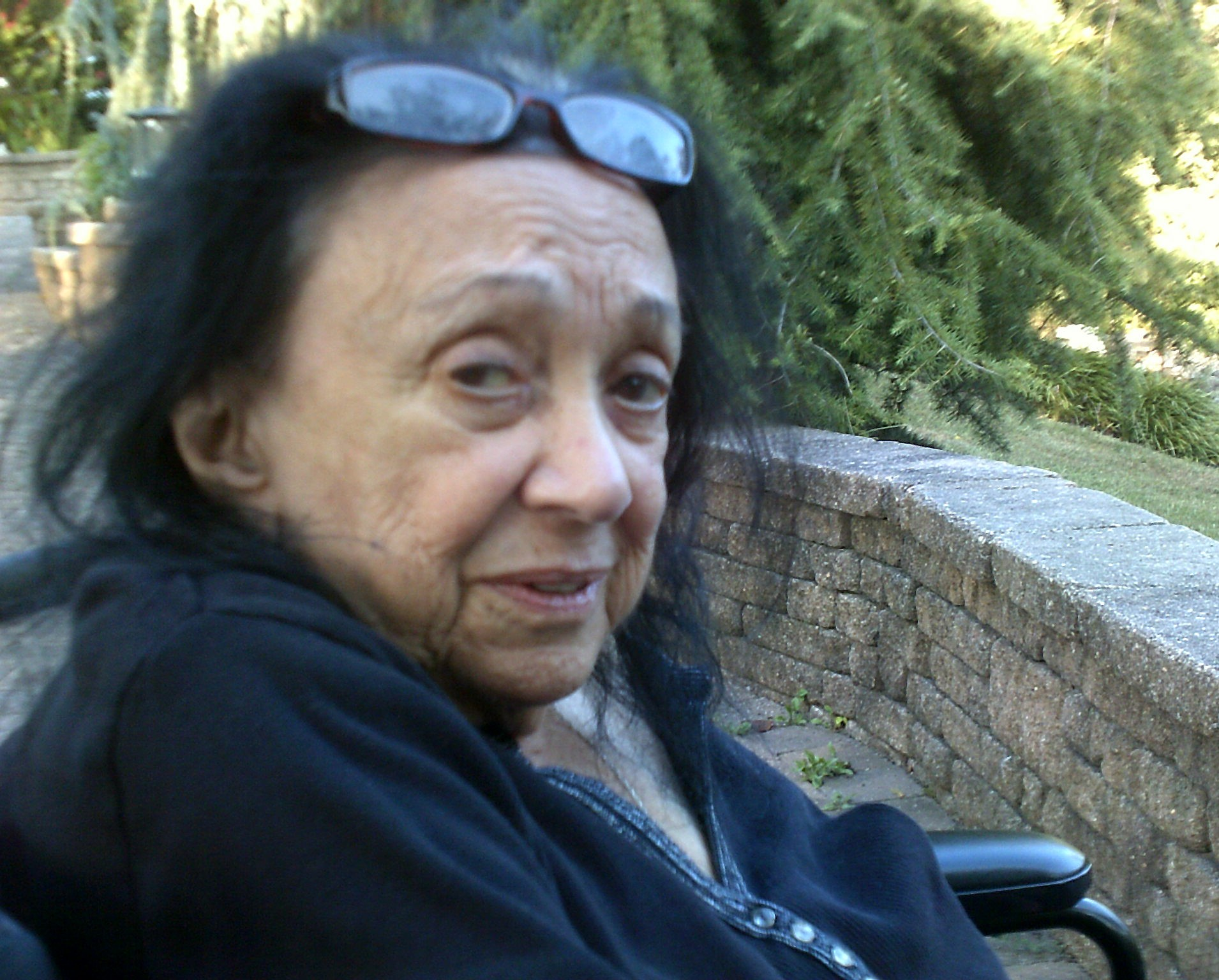
Malina circa 2014

Malina met her long-time collaborator and husband Julian Beck in 1943 when she was 17 and he was a student at Yale University. Beck, originally a painter, came to share her interest in political theatre. In 1947, the couple founded The Living Theatre, which they directed together until Beck's death in 1985. Beck and Malina had "two offstage children", Garrick and Isha.

Malina's and Beck's marriage was non-monogamous. The bisexual Beck had a long-term male partner as did Malina. In 1988, she married her long-term partner Hanon Reznikov. They co-directed the Living Theatre's activity in the Middle East, Europe and the United States, until Reznikov's unexpected death in 2008.

While not on tour, Malina lived in New York City until she moved to the Lillian Booth Actors Home in Englewood, New Jersey in 2013. Malina died in Englewood, New Jersey, on April 10, 2015.

== Awards and honors ==
In 1996, Malina was awarded an honorary Doctor of Humane Letters degree from Whittier College. In 2007, she was awarded an honorary Doctor of Fine Arts degree from Lehman College. In 2008 she received the Ordem do Mérito Cultural from the government of Brazil.

== Selected bibliography ==
- Entretiens avec le Living Théâtre (with Julian Beck and Jean-Jaques Lebel) (1969)
- We, The Living Theatre (with Julian Beck and Aldo Lastagmo) (1970)
- Paradise Now (with Julian Beck) (1971)
- The Enormous Despair, Diaries 1968, 1969 (New York: Random House, 1972)
- Le Legs de Cain: trois projets pilotes (with Julian Beck) (1972)
- Frankenstein (Venice Version) (with Julian Beck) (1972)
- Sette meditazioni sul sadomachismo politico (with Julian Beck) (1977)
- Living Heist Leben Theater (with Imke Buchholz) (1978)
- Diary excerpts Brazil 1970, Diary of Bologna 1977 (1979)
- Poems of a Wandering Jewess (book of poetry; Paris: Handshake Editions, 1982)
- The Diaries of Judith Malina: 1947–1957 (New York: Grove Press, 1984)
- Love & Politics (book of poetry; Detroit: Black & Red, 2001)
- The Piscator Notebook (London/NYC: Routledge, 2012)
- Full Moon Stages: Personal Notes from 50 Years in the Living Theatre (book of poetry; New York: Three Rooms Press, 2015)

== Filmography ==
Judith Malina film and television credits
Year	Title	Role	Notes	Ref.
1957	The Bachelor Party	Long-hair Village intellectual (uncredited)	Theatrical film	
1958	Narcissus	Narration (voice)	Theatrical film	
1963	Flaming Creatures	The Fascinating Woman	Theatrical film	
1963	Queen of Sheba Meets the Atom Man	Unknown	Theatrical film	
1968	Après la Passion selon Sade	Unknown	Theatrical film	
1968	Wheel of Ashes	Crazy Woman Preaching	Theatrical film	
1968	Candy	Bit Part	Theatrical film	
1969	Love and Anger	Unknown	Theatrical film. Segment: "Agonia"	
1975	Dog Day Afternoon	Mother	Theatrical film	
1986	No Picnic	Unknown	Theatrical film	
1987	Radio Days	Mrs. Waldbaum	Theatrical film	
1987	The Secret of My Success	Mrs. Meacham	Theatrical film	
1987	China Girl	Mrs. Monte	Theatrical film	
1989	American Stories, Food, Family and Philosophy	Unknown	Theatrical film	
1989	The Equalizer	Old Woman	Episode: "Heart of Justice"	
1989	Enemies, A Love Story	Masha's Mother	Theatrical film	
1990	Awakenings	Rose	Theatrical film	
1991	The Addams Family	Grandmama	Theatrical film	
1993	Household Saints	Carmela Santangelo	Theatrical film	
1994	Men Lie	Unknown	Theatrical film	
1997	The Deli	Vincenza Amico	Theatrical film	
1998	Music from Another Room	Clara Klammer	Theatrical film	
2000	Snow Day	Grammy		
2003	Nothing Really Happens: Memories of Aging Strippers	Tillie Hirsch	Theatrical film	
2006	The Sopranos	Aunt Dottie	Episode: "The Fleshy Part of the Thigh"	
2010	When in Rome	Umberto's Grandma	Theatrical film	
2010	New York Memories		by Rosa von Praunheim	
2013	Over/Under	Catherine	Television film	
2019	The Forgiveness of Judith Malina			

== Accolades ==
- 2003, induction into the American Theater Hall of Fame.
- 2008, annual Artistic Achievement Award from the New York Innovative Theatre Awards. This honor was presented to Malina by Olympia Dukakis on behalf of her peers and fellow artists of the Off-Off-Broadway community "in recognition of her unabashed pioneering spirit and unyielding dedication to her craft and the Off-Off-Broadway community".
- 2009, the Edwin Booth Award from the Doctoral Theatre Students Association of the City University of New York.
- Other awards include the Lola d'Annunzio award (1959); Page One Award (1960); Obie Award (1960, 1964, 1969, 1975, 1987, 1989, and 2007); Creative Arts Citation, Brandeis University (1961); Grand Prix du Théâtre des Nations (1961); Paris Critics Circle medallion (1961); Prix de L'Université de Paris (1961); New England Theater Conference Award (1962); Olympio Prize (1967); and a Guggenheim fellowship (1985).
