= Central Avenue Jazz Festival =

The Central Avenue Jazz Festival is a yearly annual free jazz festival that takes place the last weekend in the month of July in the Southern section of Los Angeles.

Central Avenue, after which the area is named, was in the 1930s and 1940s a vibrant center for jazz. At this time the infamous covenant line along Washington Boulevard demarcated the areas where African Americans were allowed to live. Even the giants of jazz music, such as Duke Ellington were allowed to play in Hollywood and other areas, but they could not stay there. They often stayed at the now-historic Dunbar Hotel. The Dunbar Hotel featured a nightclub called the Club Alabam, where the jazz greats would play after hours. All around the hotel there were numerous other clubs featuring jazz and blues, which were the launching point for the careers of many well-known musicians. One of the aims of the festival is to raise funds for the preservation of the Dunbar Hotel.

The festival takes place on several blocks of Central Avenue, south of Martin Luther King Jr. Boulevard, which includes the Dunbar Hotel. There are many booths with food, arts and crafts, as well as community outreach programs. The festival is free of charge, and in previous years has included free secure parking at a local school.

The festival was started in 1996 and has regularly featured a number of prominent jazz, blues, and Latin Jazz musicians who got their start in the area, such as Teddy Edwards, Gerald Wilson, Arthur Blythe and Ernie Andrews. A strong component of the festival's format has been to spotlight young Los Angeles musicians, such as Kamasi Washington, and Kalil Wilson, as well as talent from the neighborhood's high school bands and choirs.

The festival distinguishes itself in that it is a thoroughly non-commercial event. There is no overbearing corporate sponsorship and there are no concessions made to commercialism.
