= Sub-bass =

Frequency range

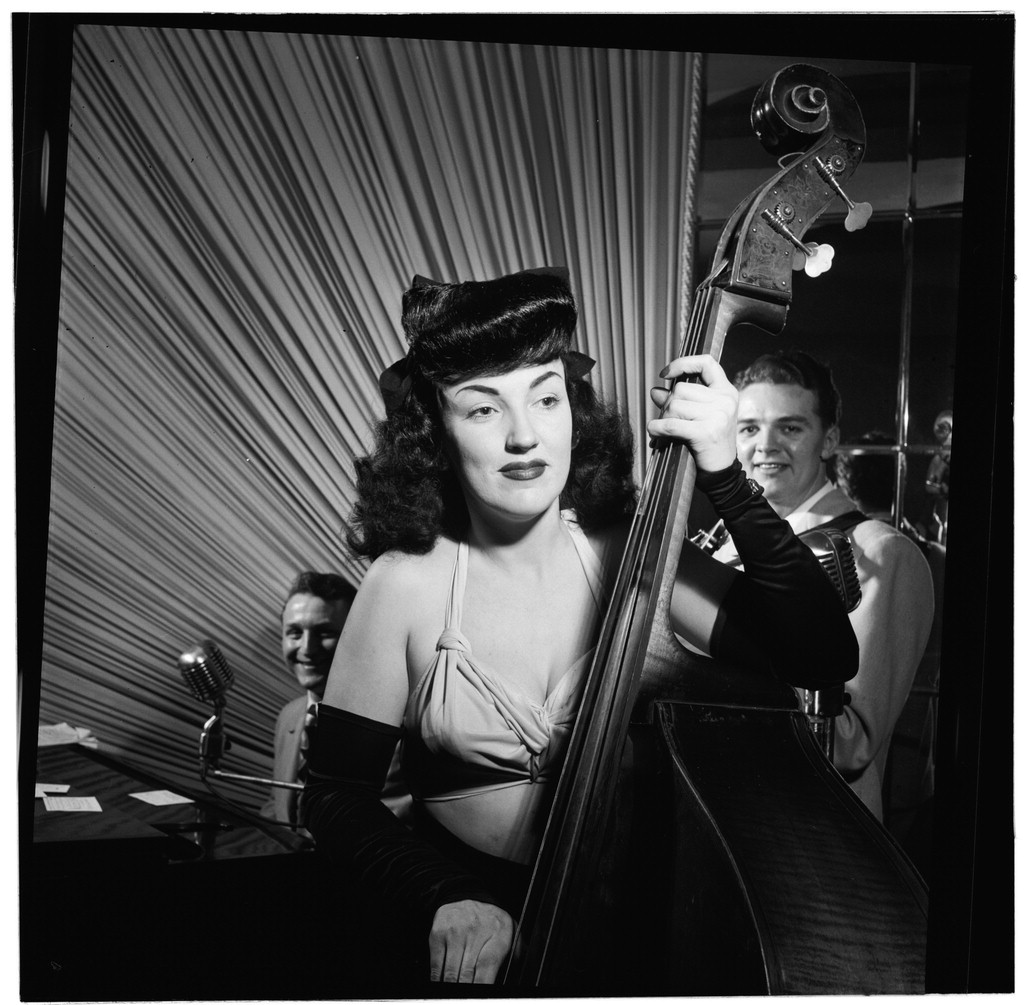
Double bass player Vivien Garry playing a show in New York City in 1947. The double bass is the sub-bass instrument of the orchestral strings family, as it produces the pitches in the lowest register for this family.

Sub-bass sounds are the deep, low-register pitches below approximately 70 Hz (C♯_{2} in scientific pitch notation) and extending downward to include the lowest frequency humans can hear, approximately 20 Hz (E_{0}).

In this range, human hearing is less sensitive, so these notes tend to be felt more than heard. The low E-string on a bass guitar is usually tuned to 41.2 Hz, while the lowest note on a standard piano is A at 27.5 Hz. Sound reinforcement systems and PA systems often use one or more subwoofer loudspeakers to amplify sounds in the sub-bass range. Sounds below sub-bass are infrasound.

== Hearing and usage ==
20 Hz is considered the normal low-frequency limit of human hearing. When pure sine waves are reproduced under ideal conditions and at very high decibels, a human listener will be able to identify tones as low as 12 Hz (G_{–1}). Audio tracks known as bass tests use sub-bass frequencies which are used to test or to demonstrate the capabilities of audio equipment. High-end subwoofers can accurately reproduce sound to about 18 Hz ±2 dB.

Sub-bass is popular in dance music, where the low frequencies are produced by the kick drum (bass drum), the bass guitar and electronic synthesizers and drum machines. Particular genres such as house music, drum and bass and dubstep often feature a bassline that consists mainly of sub-bass frequencies. Much experimental music uses sub-bass, in particular drone music, where the majority of the sound can often be in the sub-bass range. Often, hip hop and rap songs feature prevalent sub-bass. The pedal keyboard range on pipe organs also often extends into the sub-bass range; the bottom note of a 16′ stop is typically tuned to 32 Hz (C_{1}), a 32′ stop at 16 Hz (C_{0}).
