= The Capp-Pierce Juggernaut =

American big band jazz ensemble

The Capp-Pierce Juggernaut is an American big band jazz ensemble, named after the 1977 album Juggernaut (Concord Jazz) by Frank Capp and Nat Pierce.

The group was known equivalently as the Capp-Pierce Orchestra and the Capp-Pierce Juggernaut in its early years. Its membership was rotating, though Capp and Pierce remained its leaders until Pierce's death in 1992, after which Capp continued with the group as "The Frank Capp Juggernaut".

== Members ==
- drums
  - Frank Capp
- piano
  - Nat Pierce
- trumpets
  - Bill Berry
  - Blue Mitchell
  - Snooky Young
  - Conte Candoli
  - Frank Szabo
- trombones
  - Benny Powell
  - Britt Woodman
  - Buster Cooper
  - Garnett Brown
  - Mel Wanzo
  - Wendell Kelly
- reeds
  - Marshal Royal
  - Lanny Morgan
  - Joe Romano
  - Richie Kamuca
  - Plas Johnson
  - Rickey Woodard
  - Pete Christlieb
  - Bob Cooper
  - Red Holloway
  - Jack Nimitz
  - Jackie Kelso
  - Joe Roccisano
- guitar
  - Herb Ellis
  - Dennis Budimir
  - John Pisano
- bass
  - Chuck Berghofer
  - Gerry Wiggins
  - Ernie Andrews
  - Bill Green

== Discography ==
- Frank Capp & Nat Pierce: Juggernaut (Concord Jazz CJ-40, 1976)
- The Capp-Pierce Juggernaut: Live at the Century Plaza with Joe Williams (Concord Jazz CJ-72, 1978)
- The Frank Capp-Nat Pierce Orchestra: Juggernaut Strikes Again! with Ernie Andrews (Concord Jazz 4183, 1982)
- The Capp-Pierce Juggernaut: Live at the Alley Cat with Ernestine Anderson (Concord Jazz 4336, 1987)

The Frank Capp Juggernaut

- In A Hefti Bag (Compositions & Arrangements By Neal Hefti) (Concord Jazz, 1995)
- Play It Again Sam (Concord Jazz, 1997)
