= Frank Szabo =

American jazz musician (1952–2018)

Frank J. Szabo (September 16, 1952 – July 26, 2018) was an American trumpeter and jazz artist.

Szabo was born in Budapest but fled with his family to the United States after the Hungarian Revolution of 1956 that displaced many.

== Career ==
After his family settled in Los Angeles, he studied trumpet with Tom Scott from age ten. He was a member of Harry James's band in 1970-1971 and toured with Ray Charles worldwide in 1971. He was active as a studio musician from the 1970s into the 2000s, playing for film soundtracks, for television, and for record labels.

== Achievements ==
As a jazz musician, he toured with Count Basie in 1975 and again in 1983. He also worked with Louie Bellson, the Capp-Pierce Juggernaut, Harry Edison, Teddy Edwards, Gene Harris, Woody Herman, Bill Holman, Chuck Mangione, Lionel Hampton, Toshiko Akiyoshi, Doc Severinsen, Don Menza, Grover Mitchell, Roger Neumann, Buddy Rich, Charlie Shoemake, Sarah Vaughan, Bill Waltrous, and Gerald Wilson.

== Discography ==
With Teddy Edwards

- Blue Saxophone (Verve/Gitanes, 1992 [1993])
- Unforgettable With Love Natalie Cole

With The Gene Harris All Star Big Band

- Tribute to Count Basie (Concord Jazz, 1988)
