= Teddy Edwards =

American jazz saxophonist (1924–2003)

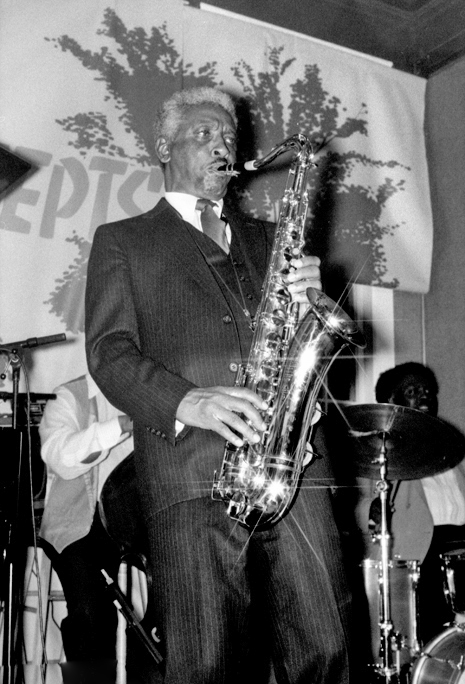
- Edwards at Koncepts Kultural Gallery, Oakland, California, 1980s

Background information
- Born: Theodore Marcus Edwards; April 26, 1924; Jackson, Mississippi, U.S.
- Died: April 20, 2003 (aged 78) Los Angeles, California, U.S.
- Genre: Jazz
- Occupation: Musician
- Instrument: Tenor saxophone
- Years active: 1947–2001

Theodore Marcus Edwards (April 26, 1924 – April 20, 2003) was an American jazz tenor saxophonist.

== Biography ==
Edwards was born in Jackson, Mississippi, United States. He learned to play at a very early age, first on alto saxophone and then clarinet.

His uncle sent for him to come to Detroit to live because he felt opportunities were better. Due to illness in the family, he went back to Jackson and ventured to Alexandria, Louisiana. He was persuaded by Ernie Fields to join his band after going to Tampa, Florida. Edwards had planned to go to New York City, but Fields convinced him he could get there by way of Washington, D.C., if he worked with his band. Edwards ended up at the "Club Alabam" on Central Avenue in Los Angeles, which later became his city of residence.

Edwards played with many jazz musicians, including his personal friend Charlie Parker, Roy Milton, Wynonie Harris, Vince Guaraldi, Joe Castro and Ernie Andrews. A 1947 recording with Dexter Gordon, The Duel, was an early challenge to another saxophonist, an approach he maintained whenever possible, including a recording with Houston Person. One such duel took place in the 1980s at London's 100 Club with British tenor Dick Morrissey. In 1964, Edwards played with Benny Goodman at Disneyland, and at the 1964 New York World's Fair.

Edwards performed and recorded with Tom Waits. He toured with him on the Heart Attack and Vine tour, and played to a packed Victoria Apollo in London with Waits and bassist Greg Cohen (the drummer had apparently been left behind after some dispute). The 1991 album, Mississippi Lad, featured two tracks with Waits, and Waits covers the Edwards-written ballad "Little Man" on his Orphans: Brawlers, Bawlers & Bastards collection.

In 2003, Edwards died at the age of 78 in Los Angeles of prostate cancer, with which he had been diagnosed in 1994.

== Discography ==
=== As leader/co-leader ===
Year	Title	Label	Notes
1947	The Foremost!	Onyx	With Dexter Gordon. Shared various artists LP with Leo Parker and Wardell Gray.
1948	Central Avenue Breakdown, Vol. 1	Onyx	Shared various artists LP with Vivien Garry/Arv Garrison and Dodo Marmarosa
1949	Central Avenue Breakdown, Vol. 2	Onyx	Shared various artists LP with Barney Kessel and Slim Gaillard
1958	Sonny Rollins at Music Inn/Teddy Edwards at Falcon's Lair	MetroJazz	With Joe Castro. Split album featuring Sonny Rollins tracks.
1959	It's About Time	Pacific Jazz	With Les McCann
1960	Sunset Eyes	Pacific Jazz; reissued on Blue Note	
1960	Teddy's Ready!	Contemporary	
1960	Back to Avalon	Contemporary	
1961	Together Again!!!!	Contemporary	With Howard McGhee
1961	Good Gravy!	Contemporary	
1962	Heart & Soul	Contemporary	
1966	Nothin' But the Truth!	Prestige	
1967	It's All Right!	Prestige	
1974	Feelin's	Muse	
1976	The Inimitable Teddy Edwards	Xanadu	
1979	Young at Heart	Storyville	With McGhee
1979	Wise in Time	Storyville	With McGhee
1980	Out of This World	SteepleChase	
1981	Good Gravy	Timeless	Live
1991	Mississippi Lad	Verve/Gitanes	Featuring Tom Waits
1993	Blue Saxophone	Verve/Gitanes	
1994	La Villa: Live in Paris	Verve/Gitanes	
1995	Tango in Harlem	Verve/Gitanes	
1996	Horn to Horn	Muse	With Houston Person
1997	Midnight Creeper	HighNote	
1999	Close Encounters	HighNote	With Person
1999	Sunset Eyes 2000	Laroo	With Saskia Laroo
2000	Ladies Man	HighNote	
2000	The Legend of Teddy Edwards	Cope	Soundtrack
2003	Smooth Sailing	HighNote	

=== As sideman ===
With Frank Butler

- Wheelin' and Dealin' (Xanadu, 1978)

With Joe Castro

- Groove Funk Soul (Atlantic, 1960)

With Sonny Criss

- Sonny's Dream (Birth of the New Cool) (Prestige, 1968)

Hampton Hawes

- Hampton Hawes All Stars At Memory Lane (Fresh Sounds, 1991)

With Richard "Groove" Holmes

- Get Up & Get It! – includes Pat Martino on guitar (Prestige, 1967)
- Welcome Home (World Pacific, 1968)

With Milt Jackson

- That's the Way It Is (Impulse!, 1969)
- Just the Way It Had to Be (Impulse!, 1969)
- Memphis Jackson (Impulse!, 1969)

With King Pleasure

- Golden Days (HiFi Jazz, 1960; reissued on Original Jazz Classics)

With Hank Jones

- Ain't Misbehavin' (Galaxy, 1978)

With Julie London

- Feeling Good (Liberty, 1965)

With Shelly Manne

- My Son the Jazz Drummer! (Contemporary, 1962)

With Les McCann

- Les McCann Sings (Pacific Jazz, 1961)
- McCann/Wilson (Pacific Jazz, 1964) with the Gerald Wilson Orchestra

With Howard McGhee

- West Coast 1945-1947 (Uptown, 2014)

With Freddie Redd

- Everybody Loves a Winner (Milestone, 1990)

With Max Roach and Clifford Brown

- Max Roach and Clifford Brown In Concert (Gene Norman Presents, 1954; reissued on GNP Crescendo)

With Jimmy Smith

- Bluesmith (Verve, 1972)

With Leroy Vinnegar

- Leroy Walks! – includes Gerald Wilson on trumpet (Contemporary, 1958)
- Leroy Walks Again!! (Contemporary, 1963)

With Randy Weston and Melba Liston

- Volcano Blues (Verve, 1993)

With Gerald Wilson

- You Better Believe It! (Pacific Jazz, 1961)
- Moment of Truth (Pacific Jazz, 1962)
- Portraits (Pacific Jazz, 1964)
- On Stage (Pacific Jazz, 1965)
- Feelin' Kinda Blues (Pacific Jazz, 1965)
- The Golden Sword (Pacific Jazz, 1966)
