= Tango in Harlem =

Studio album by Teddy Edwards
- Released: 1995
- Recorded: December 21–23, 1994
- Studio: New York City
- Genre: Jazz
- Length: 69:54
- Label: Verve/Gitanes; 527 468-2
- Producer: Jean-Philippe Allard

Teddy Edwards chronology
La Villa: Live in Paris (1993)	Tango in Harlem (1995)	Horn to Horn (1994)

Tango in Harlem is an album by saxophonist Teddy Edwards recorded in 1995 and originally released on the French Verve/Gitanes label the following year.

== Reception ==
Professional ratings
Review scores
Source	Rating
BBC Music	5/5 stars

In his review for BBC Music Magazine, Chris Parker stated "In his most sympathetic recording situation for a while, and playing a judicious mix of standards and bluesy originals with a first class rhythm section, Teddy Edwards (who is 72 this month) has produced what is probably his finest album since Together Again!!!! and Teddy's Ready!, the latter also featuring Billy Higgins. Edwards's sound is elegant, deceptively easygoing and intensely melodic but is laced with enough post-bop astringency to lift him firmly out of the easy-listening category. On ballads such as 'The Nearness of You' and 'Old Folks', their momentum miraculously sustained through murderously slow tempos by excellent rhythm-section work, he savours every lingering note. On up-tempo, bustling pieces, his solos, while supremely logical, are imbued with his trademark relaxed swing. ... Overall, a superb performance from a mature master".

== Track listing ==
All compositions by Teddy Edwards except where noted

1. "Bésame Mucho" (Consuelo Velázquez) – 6:15
2. "The Nearness of You" (Hoagy Carmichael, Ned Washington) – 7:27
3. "Cruisin' and Groovin'" – 7:10
4. "Two Steps Down" – 4:41
5. "Old Folks" (Willard Robison. Dedette Lee Hill) – 6:12
6. "Sunset Eyes" – 6:54
7. "Ornithology" (Benny Harris, Charlie Parker) – 4:16
8. "Tango in Harlem" – 5:16
9. "Alfie" (Burt Bacharach, Hal David) – 4:05
10. "Nica's Dream" (Horace Silver) – 7:28
11. "Undecided" (Charlie Shavers, Sid Robin) – 4:29
12. "Sponavating the Blues" – 5:28

== Personnel ==
- Teddy Edwards – tenor saxophone
- Christian McBride – bass
- Billy Higgins – drums
