= Saskia Laroo =

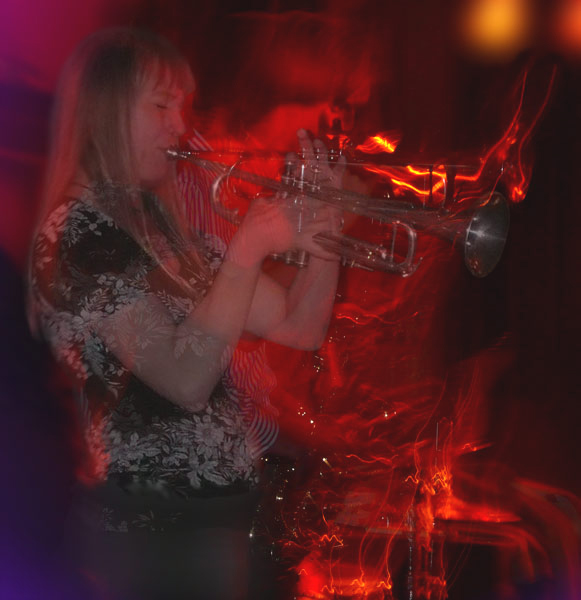

Background information
- Born: 31 July 1959 (age 66)
- Origin: Amsterdam, Netherlands
- Genres: Nu jazz, jazz rap, jazz fusion, post-bop, bossa nova
- Instruments: Trumpet, saxophone, vocals, cornet, piano, upright bass

Saskia Laroo (born 31 July 1959 in Amsterdam), is a Dutch jazz musician who has been dubbed the "Lady Miles Davis". Her music style can be described as a combination of jazz, pop, electronic dance music, Latin and world music.

== Biography ==
The beginning

Laroo was born in de Jordaan, Amsterdam, Netherlands as the eldest of four daughters. When she was six the family moved to Den Ilp, a nearby village. A year later she started with general music lessons and lessons on soprano recorder, later also alto recorder at the music school in Purmerend. In Den Ilp she started age 8 to play the cornet in fanfare orchestra De Eendracht. Laroo went in 1971 at age 11 to secondary school: het Zaanlands Lyceum, Zaandam. She switched from recorder to cello and took lessons for 3 years with cellist Olof Groesz, who became cellist of the Metropole Orchestra. When she was fifteen Saskia became interested in learning guitar and self-studied classical and folk music on the instrument for a year. A year later she was introduced to jazz music by the newly founded bigband on her high school and became member of the trumpet section. This bigband was conducted by pianist Jan Molenaar, who is owner of Molenaar Muziekuitgeverij. She got her first lessons in jazz improvisation with this band and heard for the first time bebop trumpet soloing by Peter Kuyt, then age 17 and also member of the bigband's trumpet section. After high school graduation in 1977, Saskia moved back to Amsterdam to study mathematics at the University of Amsterdam, but instead soon got involved in the city's music scene, and switched from cornet to trumpet. A year later she stopped her mathematics study and went to the Muziekpedagogische Academie Alkmaar where she studied for two years with main subject classical trumpet with trumpeter Jan Schut and secondary instruments classical piano and upright bass; then continued her music studies with focus on improvised music at the Conservatory of Amsterdam, then named Sweelinck Conservatorium. She had trumpet lessons in improvised music with trumpeter Boy Raaijmaker, then member of the Willem Breuker Kollektief, continued her studies classical trumpet with trumpeter Dick Jonker, then member of the Amsterdam Philharmonic Orchestra, took jazz piano lessons and classical upright bass lessons with bassist Hans Krul. In 1982 she was released from the school but took up her studies a year later at the Muziekpedagogische Academie Hilversum, current part of the Conservatory of Amsterdam. There she studied jazz trumpet with trumpeter Ack van Rooyen, and continued with jazz piano and classical upright bass lessons. In 1985, when she was 25, she graduated as a jazz trumpet music teacher after two years

Later years

In 1982 she made her first recordings that were released on LP with the band Fra Fra Sound and the reggae band PI Man & Memre Buku. In 1985 she played a solo on the song Don't you leave me Baby for Billy Preston's album: You can't keep a good man down. In 1994 she founded her own record label, Laroo Records. Her first CD album It's Like Jazz(1994), was co-produced by her and Rob Gaasterland, and was released in more than fifteen countries, amongst others in Japan, and speeded up the development of her international career. She toured with her own formations, amongst others with the Saskia Laroo Band, Jazzkia and Duo Laroo/Byrd with Warren Byrd to countries such as the USA; Canada; South Africa in 1996 and 2007; Brazil, China in 2004 and 2007 and she went for multiple tours to India. She played on international festivals, like the Montreux Jazzfestival in 2006 and again in 2007 after receiving the Montreux Jazz Award. She received in 2010 an Indian peace prize, the Karmaveer Puraskaar of the iCongo organisation in New Delhi, India. In 2013 she recorded a DVD Live in Zimbabwe with her eight piece Saskia laroo Band at the Harare International Festival of the Arts. This DVD was released on 28 March 2014 and a limited edition on CD on 15 October, both in Paradiso, Amsterdam. In 2019 she celebrates 40 years performing live on stage, 25 years her record label Laroo Records and 25 years the Saskia Laroo Band. A new album release Trumpets Around The World is scheduled in the Netherlands for 1 November 2019 in het Concertgebouw, Amsterdam and in the US on 29 November 2019 at The Buttonwood Tree, Middletown, Connecticut.

== Bands ==
Laroo's first performances started around 1978 with pop, fusion and dixieland bands. She was part of the all-female band Alice in Dixieland, played around 1981 in the Surinamese band Fra Fra Sound and was part of the free jazz workshop orchestra De Boventoon, she started working with American blues vocalist and saxophonist Rosa King, with Dutch saxophonist Hans Dulfer, and his daughter Candy Dulfer, with Edsel Juliet's group Saljuco, toured with Dutch Connection, an avant-garde project with American conductor/trumpeter/composer Butch Morris, and with Heleen Schuttevaer's all female jazzpop band Five Times A Lady.

Later on in her career she performed with jazz greats such as Teddy Edwards and Ernie Andrews and performs currently with Warren Byrd's group The Byrdspeak Ensemble, as well as Warren Byrd and David Chevan's group The Afro-Semitic Experience. She did dance cross-overs with 100% Isis, Ken Ishii, DJ Dimitri, Ronald Molendijk and has done recent performances with Hungarian DJ and producer Dansor, Israelian Dj and bassist Oded Nir

== Own formations ==
1982 – 1986: Salsa Caliente

1986 – 1990: Caribbean Express

1990 – 1994: Caribbean Colours

1993–present: Salsabop

1993–present: Saskia's Solo Act

1994–present: The Saskia Laroo Band, at first named: the Laroo Colour

1996–present: Jazzkia

2009–present: Duo Laroo/Byrd

== Performances ==
2020: India (World Jazz Fest in Mumbai and Goa), the Netherlands, the US

2019: Burundi (Dutch Kings Day), the Netherlands, Thailand (Krabi Naga Fest), the US

2018: the Netherlands, the US, Vietnam (Dutch Kings Day, 45-year relations Holland-Vietnam

2017: Serbia (Dutch Kings Day), South Korea, the Netherlands, the US

2016: Belgium, China Tour, Croatia Tour, France, India Tour, Indonesia tour, the Netherlands, the US.

2015: Bangla Desh, Italy, India, Lithuenia (Klaipeda Jazz Festival), Poland, the Netherlands (Aalsmeer Jazz Weekend, Amersfoort & Apeldoorn Jazzfestivals), Russia, the US (a.o. Cape Cod, MA; Carlyle, PA)

2014: Germany, the Netherlands, Poland (Jelenia Gora Jazzfest), the US (a.o. Atlanta, GA; Winston Salem, NC; Sacramento, GA)

2013: DR Congo (Jazzkif Fest), Thailand (a.o. Bangkok Festivals), the Netherlands (a.o. festivals Amersfoort, Zandvoort), the US, Zimbabwe (a.o. HIFA)

2012: Mexico & Guatemala (a.o. Eurojazz), Oman (Sohar Music Festival), US (a.o. Distinctively Dutch Tour), the Netherlands (a.o. Festivals Breda, Leeuwarden, Oisterwijk )

2011: Belgium (a.o. Gouvy Jazz), Brazil (Rio das Ostras Jazz e Blues Fest), Canada (Sunfest), Croatia, Finland (Imatra Big Band Fest), India, the Netherlands, the US.

2010: Belgium, Bulgaria (Balcik Fest), Chile (8 concerts a.o. Bicentenario, International jazzfest Puerto Montt), Georgia, Germany (Women in Jazz Festival, Halle), Hong Kong (Music Beyond Borders), India, Italy, Moldavia, the Netherlands (jazzfests Amersfoort, Apeldoorn, Heiloo etc), Poland, Russia, Serbia (Nisville Jazzfest), Thailand (Koh Samui JF, Jazzup Bangkok), the US.

2009: ao Bahrain jazzfest, France (Hotel de Ville, Paris), India (jazz Utsav Fest), Kuwait jazzfest, Netherlands (jazzfestivals Almere; Amersfoort; Breda; Hoofddorp), Oman (Sohar Music Fest), Qatar jazzfest, the US (ao Hartford, CT; Chicago, MI; New York; Nedfest, Nederland, Colorado; Boston; Detroit).

2008: Brazil (ao Sampa Jazz Festival /Sao Paulo, Olinda Jazz Fest), Germany (Women in Jazz Festival, Halle), India (Chivas Jazz Fest 4 cities), Moldavia (Ethno Jazzfest), Netherlands, Poland (Era Jazzu), Russia, Singapore (Mosaic Festival), Senegal, Taiwan (Taichung Jazzfest, Holland Days Tainan), Ukraine, the US (Nedfest).

2007: Austria (Steyr Jazzfest), Brazil, China, Croatia (festivals Osijek, Histria), India(2 tours: Chennai, Delhi, Goa, Pune), Italy (Lucca Donna Jazz Fest), Netherlands, Poland (Bielska Zadymka Jazzowa), Ukraine, Russia, South Africa (Cape Town Jazzfest), Swiss (Montreux Jazzfestival), Taiwan, Thailand (Bangkok Festivals), the US (Rochester Jazzfest / Parkville Bluesfest/Montreux-Atlanta Jazzfestival)

2006: Belgium, Croatia (Jazzfestivals Zadar & Losinj), France, Italy (Women Jazz series), Germany, Nepal (Garden of Dreams Jazz Affair), the Netherlands, Poland, Russia, Slovenia (Festival Lent), Swiss (Montreux Jazzfestival), Ukraine (Koktebel Jazzfestival), the US.

2005: Austria, Croatia (Split Jazz Festival), Czech Republic (Prague Jazz Festival), France, Indonesia (Java Jazz Festival), Japan, Lebanon (Grand Hills Jazz Festival), the Netherlands, Nicaragua (Tolerancia Festival), Poland (Ladies Festival), Russia, Surinam (Surinam Jazz Festival), the US.

2004: China, Croatia, Czech Republic (Prague Jazz Festival), France, India (Jazz Yatra Festival), Indonesia (Bali Jazz Festival), Kuwait Jazz Festival, Lithuania (Gaida Contemporary Music Festival), the Netherlands, Poland.

2003: Croatia (several international festivals), the Netherlands, Poland (several international festivals), Russia.

2002: Baltic States (Mama Jazz Festival), Croatia, Curacao (Curacao Jazz Festival), France, Germany, the Netherlands, the US.

2001: Germany (Burghause Jazzwoche), the Netherlands, Switzerland, the US (Atlanta & Savannah Jazz Festivals).

2000: Belgium, Colombia, Dutch Antilles tour (5 islands), Germany, Japan (Sunset Jazz Festival), the Netherlands (North Sea Jazz Festival), Spain, the US.

1999: Austria, Belgium, Bulgaria (Sofia Jazz Festival), France, Germany, Italy, Luxembourg, the Netherlands (North Sea Jazz Festival), Spain, Switzerland, Russia, the US.

1998: France, the Netherlands (North Sea Jazz Festival), Switzerland

1997: Bulgaria (Sofia Jazz Festival), Lebanon (Hamra Jazz Festival), Lithuania, the Netherlands, Russia.

1996: Hungary, the Netherlands, Spain

1995: Czech Republic, the Netherlands (North Sea Jazz Festival), the Philippines, Poland, Slovakia, South Africa, South Korea.

== Discography on Laroo Records ==
=== Albums ===
- Saskia Laroo – It's Like Jazz (1994; CD album)
- Saskia Laroo – Bodymusic (1998; CD album)
- Saskia Laroo – Jazzkia (1999; CD album)
- Saskia Laroo meets Teddy Edwards feat. Ernie Andrews – Sunset Eyes 2000 (1999; CD album)
- Saskia Laroo – Really Jazzy (2008; CD album)
- Duo Saskia Laroo and Warren Byrd – Two of a Kind (2011; CD album)
- Saskia Laroo Band – Live in Zimbabwe (2014; DVD)
- Saskia Laroo Band – Live in Zimbabwe (2014; CD album)
- Saskia Laroo – Trumpets Around The World (2019; LP)
- Saskia Laroo – Trumpets Around The World (2019; CD album)
