= The Inimitable Teddy Edwards =

Studio album by Teddy Edwards
- Released: 1976
- Recorded: June 25, 1976
- Studio: NYC
- Genre: Jazz
- Length: 41:20
- Label: Xanadu; 134
- Producer: Don Schlitten

Teddy Edwards chronology
Feelin's (1980)	The Inimitable Teddy Edwards (1976)	Young at Heart (1979)

The Inimitable Teddy Edwards is an album by saxophonist Teddy Edwards recorded in 1976 and released on the Xanadu label.

== Reception ==
Professional ratings
Review scores
Source	Rating
AllMusic	4/5 stars

In his review for AllMusic, Scott Yanow stated "this LP is a superior outing".

== Track listing ==
1. "Sunset Eyes" (Teddy Edwards) – 10:00
2. "That Old Black Magic" (Harold Arlen, Johnny Mercer) – 4:40
3. "Mean to Me" (Fred E. Ahlert, Roy Turk) – 7:17
4. "Imagination" (Jimmy Van Heusen, Johnny Burke) – 5:44
5. "One on One" (Edwards) – 3:38
6. "Stella by Starlight" (Victor Young, Ned Washington) – 9:58

== Personnel ==
- Teddy Edwards – tenor saxophone
- Duke Jordan – piano
- Larry Ridley – bass
- Freddie Waits – drums
