= Out of This World (Teddy Edwards album) =

Studio album by Teddy Edwards Quartet
- Released: 1981
- Recorded: December 5, 1980
- Genre: Jazz
- Length: 57:30
- Label: SteepleChase; SCS 1147
- Producer: Nils Winther

Teddy Edwards chronology
Wise in Time (1979)	Out of This World (1981)	Good Gravy (1981)

Out of This World is an album by saxophonist Teddy Edwards recorded in Denmark in 1980 for the SteepleChase label. The 1995 CD reissue added an additional track.

== Reception ==
Professional ratings
Review scores
Source	Rating
AllMusic	4/5 stars
The Penguin Guide to Jazz Recordings	3/4 stars

In his review for AllMusic, Scott Yanow stated "Teddy Edwards has yet to record an unworthy set and his swinging session (one of only two that he made as a leader during 1977–90) will be enjoyed by bop collectors".

== Track listing ==
All compositions by Teddy Edwards except where noted.

1. "No Name No. 1" – 6:00
2. "April Love" – 6:47
3. "Out of This World" (Harold Arlen, Johnny Mercer) – 11:07
4. "Summertime" (George Gershwin, DuBose Heyward) – 8:29
5. "That's All" (Bob Haymes, Alam Brandt) – 8:00
6. "Cheek to Cheek" (Irving Berlin) – 6:05
7. "Summertime" [alternate take] (Gershwin, Heyward) – 10:48 Bonus track on CD reissue

== Personnel ==
- Teddy Edwards – tenor saxophone
- Kenny Drew – piano
- Jesper Lundgaard – bass
- Billy Hart – drums
