= Ladies Man (album) =

Studio album by Teddy Edwards
- Released: 2001
- Recorded: May 17, 2000
- Studio: Van Gelder Studio, Englewood Cliffs, NJ
- Genre: Jazz
- Length: 54:14
- Label: HighNote; HCD 7067
- Producer: Houston Person

Teddy Edwards chronology
Sunset Eyes 2000 (1999)	Ladies Man (2001)	The Legend of Teddy Edwards (2000)

Ladies Man is an album by saxophonist Teddy Edwards which was recorded in 2000 and released on the HighNote label the following year.

== Reception ==
Professional ratings
Review scores
Source	Rating
Allmusic	4/5 stars
The Penguin Guide to Jazz Recordings	3/4 stars

In his review on Allmusic, Scott Yanow states "For this project, veteran tenor saxophonist Teddy Edwards performs ten songs named after women's names, including his own "Saskia." Despite the potentially gimmicky nature of the repertoire, the music is conventional hard bop ... this is an excellent outing, well worth exploring by straight-ahead jazz collectors"

== Track listing ==
1. "Jeannie" (Duke Pearson) – 5:37
2. "Rosetta" (Earl Hines) – 5:17
3. "Ruby" (Heinz Roemheld, Mitchell Parish) – 6:06
4. "Candy" (Alex Kramer, Mack David, Joan Whitney) – 4:21
5. "Saskia" (Teddy Edwards) – 5:47
6. "Diane" (Ernö Rapée, Lew Pollack) – 4:03
7. "Donna Lee" (Charlie Parker) – 5:25
8. "Marie" (Irving Berlin) – 6:08
9. "Laura" (David Raksin, Johnny Mercer) – 6:22
10. "Rosalie" (Cole Porter) – 5:08

== Personnel ==
- Teddy Edwards – tenor saxophone
- Eddie Allen – trumpet (tracks 1, 5, 7 & 8)
- Ronnie Mathews – piano
- Chip Jackson – bass
- Chip White – drums
