= Heart & Soul (Teddy Edwards album) =

Studio album by Teddy Edwards
- Released: 1962
- Recorded: April 24, 1962
- Studio: Los Angeles, CA
- Genre: Jazz
- Length: 41:44
- Label: Contemporary; M 3606/S7606
- Producer: Lester Koenig

Teddy Edwards chronology
Good Gravy! (1961)	Heart & Soul (1962)	Nothin' But the Truth! (1966)

Heart & Soul is an album by saxophonist Teddy Edwards which was recorded in 1962 and released on the Contemporary label.

== Reception ==
Professional ratings
Review scores
Source	Rating
Allmusic	3/5 stars
The Penguin Guide to Jazz Recordings	3/4 stars

Allmusic awarded the album 3 stars stating "Edwards is in typically fine form".

== Track listing ==
All compositions by Teddy Edwards except as indicated

1. "Smokin'" (Teddy Edwards, Gerry Wiggins) - 6:08
2. "No Regrets" - 4:48
3. "Secret Love" (Sammy Fain, Paul Francis Webster) - 8:22
4. "Little Steddy" - 6:08
5. "Wiggin'" (Wiggins) - 6:27
6. "A Bag of Blues" - 6:22
7. "Heart and Soul" (Hoagy Carmichael, Frank Loesser) - 3:29

== Personnel ==
- Teddy Edwards - tenor saxophone
- Gerry Wiggins - organ
- Leroy Vinnegar - bass
- Milt Turner - drums
