= Warren Byrd =

American jazz pianist, vocalist and composer

Warren Byrd (born January 24, 1965) is an Afro-American jazz pianist, vocalist and composer.

He performs live and tours as a solo pianist and vocalist with, his own band: the Byrdspeak Ensemble, is co-leader with Jewish bassist and composer David Chevan of the Afro-Semitic Experience, with Dutch trumpeter and composer Saskia Laroo and her formations.

== Biography ==
He was born in Hartford, Connecticut, as the youngest of sixteen and started to sing in the church choir at age 4. He first started to play the piano at age nine and to compose piano two years later. His teacher piano and music theory was the church music director Thomassian Neely. He went to South Catholic High School and got lessons there from R. Lesie Childs. During his teens he got interested in theatre and performed with the Hartford Stage Company. He graduated in 1983 from high school and earned a full scholarship Classical Voice at Hartt College of Music but abandoned his studies to pursuit jazz piano studies, primarily self-taught. Between 1983 and 1989 he continued to perform in theatre and dance as actor and musician with the Performing Ensemble and the Hartford Contemporary Dance Ensemble, became a choir director at a Baptist Church in Hartford, worked with Nubian Nation from 1991 to 1993; with Orchestra Espada from 1989 till 1996; with Mike DiRubbo Quartet; the Explorers Quintet with trombonist Steve Davis, Mixashawn Quartet. He worked as a sideman with Eddie Henderson, Archie Shepp, Javon Jackson, J.D. Parran, Houston Person, Roseanne Vitro, and with Hartford musicians including Paul H. Brown, Nat Reeves, Norman Gage, and Mario Pavone. He placed in the top 25 of the 1999 Thelonious Monk International Piano Competition and was nominated for Advocate’s Best of Hartford Keyboardist 8 times between 1994 and 2002. Current performances include with his own formations, the Saskia Laroo Band, Duo Laroo/Byrd, The Afro-Semitic Experience.

== Discography ==
1998 Warren Byrd, David Chevan - Avadim Hayinu (Once We Were Slaves) (CD) Reckless DC Music

2000 Warren Byrd - Truth Raised Twice (CD) Byrdspeak Productions

2000 David Chevan, Warren Byrd - Let Us Break Bread Together (CD) Reckless DC Music

2004 Funk de Nite - J-5 (CD album) Laroo Records

2011 Saskia Laroo & Warren Byrd - Two Of A Kind, Collaboration, A Tribute To Miles & Monk (CD, Album) Laroo Records, Byrdspeak Productions

2014 Saskia Laroo Band - Live in Zimbabwe (DVD, CD album) Laroo Records

2016 M.A. Bakker* Featuring Warren Byrd - Rejected Scripts (CD, Album) Maarten Bakker

2019 Saskia Laroo - Trumpets Around The World (Cd, vinyl album) Laroo Records

2020 Warren Byrd - Truth Raised Twice (CD) Laroo Records / Byrdspeak Productions (re-release)

== Performances ==
2024: United States tour including American Mural Project, in Winsted, Connecticut

2020: India (World Jazz Fest in Mumbai and Goa), the Netherlands, the US

2019: Burundi (Dutch Kings Day), the Netherlands, Thailand (Krabi Naga Fest), the US

2018: the Netherlands, the US, Vietnam (Dutch Kings Day, 45 year relations Holland-Vietnam

2017: Serbia (Dutch Kings Day), South Korea, the Netherlands, the US

2016: Belgium, China Tour, Croatia Tour, France, India Tour, Indonesia tour, the Netherlands, the US.

2015: Bangla Desh, Italy, India, Lithuenia (Klaipeda Jazz Festival), Poland, the Netherlands (Aalsmeer Jazz Weekend, Amersfoort & Apeldoorn Jazzfestivals), Russia, the US (a.o. Cape Cod, MA; Carlyle, PA)

2014: Germany, the Netherlands, Poland (Jelenia Gora Jazzfest), the US (a.o. Atlanta, GA; Winston Salem, NC; Sacramento, GA)

2013: DR Congo (Jazzkif Fest), Thailand (a.o. Bangkok Festivals), the Netherlands (a.o. festivals Amersfoort, Zandvoort), the US, Zimbabwe (a.o. HIFA)

2012: Mexico & Guatemala (a.o. Eurojazz), Oman (Sohar Music Festival), US (a.o. Distinctively Dutch Tour), the Netherlands (a.o. Festivals Breda, Leeuwarden, Oisterwijk )

2011: Belgium (a.o. Gouvy Jazz), Brazil (Rio das Ostras Jazz e Blues Fest), Canada (Sunfest), Croatia, Finland (Imatra Big Band Fest), India, the Netherlands, the US.

2010: Belgium, Bulgaria (Balcik Fest), Chile (8 concerts a.o. Bicentenario, International jazzfest Puerto Montt), Georgia, Germany (Women in Jazz Festival, Halle), Hong Kong (Music Beyond Borders), India, Italy, Moldavia, the Netherlands (jazzfests Amersfoort, Apeldoorn, Heiloo etc), Poland, Russia, Serbia (Nisville Jazzfest), Thailand (Koh Samui JF, Jazzup Bangkok), the US.

2009: ao Bahrain jazzfest, France (Hotel de Ville, Paris), India (jazz Utsav Fest), Kuwait jazzfest, Netherlands (jazzfestivals Almere; Amersfoort; Breda; Hoofddorp), Oman (Sohar Music Fest), Qatar jazzfest, the US (ao Hartford, CT; Chicago, MI; New York; Nedfest, Nederland, Colorado; Boston; Detroit).

2008: Brazil (ao Sampa Jazz Festival /Sao Paulo, Olinda Jazz Fest), Germany (Women in Jazz Festival, Halle), India (Chivas Jazz Fest 4 cities), Moldavia (Ethno Jazzfest), Netherlands, Poland (Era Jazzu), Russia, Singapore (Mosaic Festival), Senegal, Taiwan (Taichung Jazzfest, Holland Days Tainan), Ukraine, the US (Nedfest).

2007: Austria (Steyr Jazzfest), Brazil, China, Croatia (festivals Osijek, Histria), India(2 tours: Chennai, Delhi, Goa, Pune), Italy (Lucca Donna Jazz Fest), Netherlands, Poland(Bielska Zadymka Jazzowa), Ukraine, Russia, South Africa (Cape Town Jazzfest), Swiss (Montreux Jazzfestival), Taiwan, Thailand (Bangkok Festivals), the US (Rochester Jazzfest / Parkville Bluesfest/Montreux-Atlanta Jazzfestival)

2006: Belgium, Croatia (Jazzfestivals Zadar & Losinj), France, Italy (Women Jazz series), Germany, Nepal (Garden of Dreams Jazz Affair), the Netherlands, Poland, Russia, Slovenia (Festival Lent), Swiss (Montreux Jazzfestival), the US.

2005: Austria, Croatia (Split Jazz Festival), Czech Republic (Prague Jazz Festival), France, Indonesia (Java Jazz Festival), Japan, Lebanon (Grand Hills Jazz Festival), the Netherlands, Nicaragua (Tolerancia Festival), Poland (Ladies Festival), Russia, Surinam (Surinam Jazz Festival), the US.

2004: China, Croatia, Czech Republic (Prague Jazz Festival), France, India (Jazz Yatra Festival), Indonesia (Bali Jazz Festival), Kuwait Jazz Festival, Lithuania (Gaida Contemporary Music Festival), the Netherlands, Poland.

2003: Croatia (several international festivals), the Netherlands, Poland (several international festivals), Russia.

2002: Baltic States (Mama Jazz Festival), Croatia, Curacao (Curacao Jazz Festival), France, Germany, the Netherlands, the US.
