= Nothin' But the Truth! =

Studio album by Teddy Edwards
- Released: 1967
- Recorded: December 13, 1966
- Studio: Van Gelder Studio, Englewood Cliffs, New Jersey
- Genre: Jazz
- Length: 32:10
- Label: Prestige; PR 7518
- Producer: Don Schlitten

Teddy Edwards chronology
| Heart & Soul (1962) | Nothin' But the Truth! (1967) | It's All Right! (1967) |

Nothin' But the Truth! is an album by saxophonist Teddy Edwards which was recorded in 1966 and released on the Prestige label.

== Reception ==
Professional ratings
Review scores
| Source | Rating |
|---|---|
| Allmusic | 3/5 stars |
| The Penguin Guide to Jazz Recordings | 3/4 stars |

Allmusic awarded the album 3 stars stating "quite brief (just 32 minutes) but it does give one a pretty definitive look into the style of tenor-saxophonist Teddy Edwards".

== Track listing ==
All compositions by Teddy Edwards except as indicated

1. "Nothin' But the Truth" - 4:07
2. "Games That Lovers Play" (James Last) - 4:08
3. "On the Street Where You Live" (Alan Jay Lerner, Frederick Loewe) - 6:44
4. "Brazilian Skies" - 5:07
5. "But Beautiful" (Johnny Burke, Jimmy Van Heusen) - 7:04
6. "Lovin' It, Lovin' It" - 5:15

== Personnel ==
- Teddy Edwards - tenor saxophone
- Walter Davis, Jr. - piano
- Phil Orlando - guitar
- Paul Chambers - bass
- Billy Higgins - drums
- Montego Joe - congas, bongos
