= Midnight Creeper (Teddy Edwards album) =

Studio album by Teddy Edwards
- Released: 1997
- Recorded: March 7, 1997
- Studio: Van Gelder Studio, Englewood Cliffs, NJ
- Genre: Jazz
- Length: 57:26
- Label: HighNote; HCD 7011
- Producer: Houston Person

Teddy Edwards chronology
Close Encounters (1996)	Midnight Creeper (1997)	Sunset Eyes 2000 (1999)

Midnight Creeper is an album by saxophonist Teddy Edwards which was recorded in 1997 and released on the HighNote label.

== Reception ==
Professional ratings
Review scores
Source	Rating
Allmusic	4.5/5 stars
The Penguin Guide to Jazz Recordings	3.5/4 stars

In his review on Allmusic, Scott Yanow states "52 years after his recording debut, Teddy Edwards proved to still be in his musical prime"

== Track listing ==
All compositions by Teddy Edwards except where noted

1. "Midnight Creeper" – 7:30
2. "Walking in the Rain" – 5:40
3. "Sensitive" – 6:06
4. "Oh, Lady Be Good!" (George Gershwin Ira Gershwin) – 10:34
5. "Don't Blame Me" (Jimmy McHugh, Dorothy Fields) – 6:49
6. "Sunday" (Chester Conn' Jule Styne, Benny Krueger Ned Miller) – 5:34
7. "Tenderly" (Walter Gross, Jack Lawrence) – 9:44
8. "Almost Like Being in Love" (Frederick Loewe, Alan Jay Lerner) – 5:29

== Personnel ==
- Teddy Edwards – tenor saxophone
- Virgil Jones – trumpet (tracks 1–3 & 6)
- Richard Wyands – piano
- Buster Williams – bass
- Chip White – drums
