= Blue Saxophone =

Studio album by Teddy Edwards Brasstring Ensemble
- Released: May 18, 1993
- Recorded: June 8, 9 & 10, 1992
- Studio: Paramount Recording Studios, Hollywood, CA
- Genre: Jazz
- Length: 66:47
- Label: Verve/Gitanes; 314 517 527-2
- Producer: Jean-Philippe Allard

Teddy Edwards chronology
Mississippi Lad (1991)	Blue Saxophone (1993)	La Villa: Live in Paris (1993)

Blue Saxophone is an album by saxophonist Teddy Edwards recorded in 1992 and released on the French Verve/Gitanes label.

== Reception ==
Professional ratings
Review scores
Source	Rating
AllMusic	4.5/5 stars

In his review for AllMusic, Scott Yanow stated "Teddy Edwards has not led enough sessions throughout his career considering his great talent. In the 1990s, he has been making up for some of the lost time by putting a great deal of planning into his releases. ... It's an impressive effort".

== Track listing ==
All compositions by Teddy Edwards except where noted

1. "Prelude" – 2:18
2. "Blue Saxophone" – 5:23
3. "Lennox Lady" – 7:28
4. "No Name Number One" – 6:33
5. "Ballad for Susan" – 5:09
6. "Brazilian Skies" – 4:25
7. "Hot Tamale Joe" – 3:16
8. "Them Dirty Old Blues" – 7:30
9. "Glass of Water" (Leroy Vinnegar) – 7:58
10. "Serenade in Blue" (Harry Warren, Mack Gordon) – 6:15
11. "Hymn for the Homeless" – 4:05
12. "Going Home" – 6:27

== Personnel ==
- Teddy Edwards – tenor saxophone, clarinet, vocals, arranger
- Oscar Brashear, James Smith, Frank Szabo – trumpet
- Thurman Green, Maurice Spears – trombone
- Brenton Banks, Mark Cargill, Michael White – violin
- Dan Weinstein – viola
- Melissa "Missy" Hasin – cello
- Carol Robbins – harp
- Art Hillery – piano
- Andy Simpkins – bass
- Mel Brown – drums
- Ray Armando – percussion
- Lisa Nobumoto – vocals (tracks 2, 6 & 7)
