= Joe Castro (pianist) =

American bebop jazz pianist (1927–2009)

Joseph Armand Castro (August 15, 1927 – December 13, 2009) was an American bebop jazz pianist, based primarily on the West Coast of the United States.

== Biography ==
Castro was born in Miami, Arizona on August 15, 1927. Castro began playing professionally at the age of 15 in the San Francisco Bay area. After army service ended in 1947, he formed a small band. In 1956 Castro moved to New York City, where his trio appeared in jazz clubs. In 1958, he moved to Los Angeles, where he joined Teddy Edwards' quartet. Castro recorded two albums as a leader for Atlantic Records: Mood Jazz in 1957 and Groove Funk Soul in 1960.

He often participated in informal jam sessions at the Beverly Hills estate of his partner, Doris Duke. Many of the performances were captured on tape. He died in 2009 at age 82.

== Discography ==
=== As leader ===
- 1957 Mood Jazz – Atlantic
- 1958 Groove Funk Soul – Atlantic
- 1960 Lush Life – Clover

=== As sideman ===
- 1956 Zoot Sims with the Joe Castro Trio Live at the Falcon Lair – Pablo Records
- 1958 Bob Andrews Presents West Coast Sax Mode – Vantage Records
- 1958 Teddy Edwards Teddy Edwards at Falcon's Lair – MetroJazz
- 1959 Teddy Edwards Quartet Sunset Eyes – Pacific Jazz Records
- 1959 June Christy Ballads for Night People, Road Show – Capitol Records
- 1959 Stan Kenton & His Orchestra/June Christy/The Four Freshmen Road Show – Capitol Records
- 1960 Teddy Edwards Quartet Teddy's Ready! – Contemporary Records
- 1960 Anita O'Day and Billy May Swing Rodgers and Hart – Verve Records
- 1960 June Christy Something Cool (stereo version) – Capitol Records
- 1960 June Christy The Cool School – Capitol Records

=== Compilations ===
- 2015 Joe Castro – Lush Life: A Musical Journey (includes jam sessions at Doris Duke's Falcon's Lair mansion and other previously unreleased recordings) – Sunnyside Records
