= Good Gravy! =

Studio album by Teddy Edwards Quartet
- Released: 1961
- Recorded: August 23–25, 1961
- Studio: Contemporary Records Studio, Los Angeles, CA
- Genre: Jazz
- Length: 41:21
- Label: Contemporary; M 3592/S7592
- Producer: Lester Koenig

Teddy Edwards chronology
Together Again!!!! (1961)	Good Gravy! (1961)	Heart & Soul (1962)

Good Gravy! is an album by saxophonist Teddy Edwards which was recorded in 1961 and released on the Contemporary label.

== Reception ==
Professional ratings
Review scores
Source	Rating
Allmusic	4/5 stars
Down Beat	4/5 stars
The Penguin Guide to Jazz Recordings	3.5/4 stars

Allmusic awarded the album 4 stars stating "Edwards is in typically swinging form on this quartet date".

== Track listing ==
All compositions by Teddy Edwards except where noted.

1. "Good Gravy" – 5:26
2. "Could You Forget" – 5:40
3. "Stairway to the Stars" (Matty Malneck, Frank Signorelli, Mitchell Parish) – 4:39
4. "A Little Later" (Nathaniel Meeks) – 4:14
5. "On Green Dolphin Street" (Bronisław Kaper, Ned Washington) – 5:23
6. "Just Friends" (John Klenner, Sam M. Lewis) – 5:17
7. "Laura" (Johnny Mercer, David Raksin) – 3:16
8. "Yes, I'll Be Ready" – 4:03
9. "Not So Strange Blues" – 3:02

== Personnel ==
- Teddy Edwards – tenor saxophone
- Danny Horton (tracks 1–3 & 6–9), Phineas Newborn, Jr. (tracks 4 & 5) – piano
- Leroy Vinnegar – bass
- Milt Turner – drums
