= Ginger Smock =

American violinist, orchestra leader, and TV personality

- Born: Emma Smock; 4 June 1920
- Origin: Los Angeles, California, United States
- Died: 13 June 1995 (aged 75)
- Genres: Jazz
- Occupation: Violinist
- Instrument: Violin

Emma Smock (4 June 1920– 13 June 1995), better known as Ginger Smock, was a violinist, orchestra leader, and local Los Angeles television personality. She is perhaps best known from her recordings with the Vivien Garry Quintet, though other recordings have surfaced recently. In addition to her work in jazz and rhythm & blues, she performed with the All City Symphony Orchestra of Los Angeles.

== Life and career ==
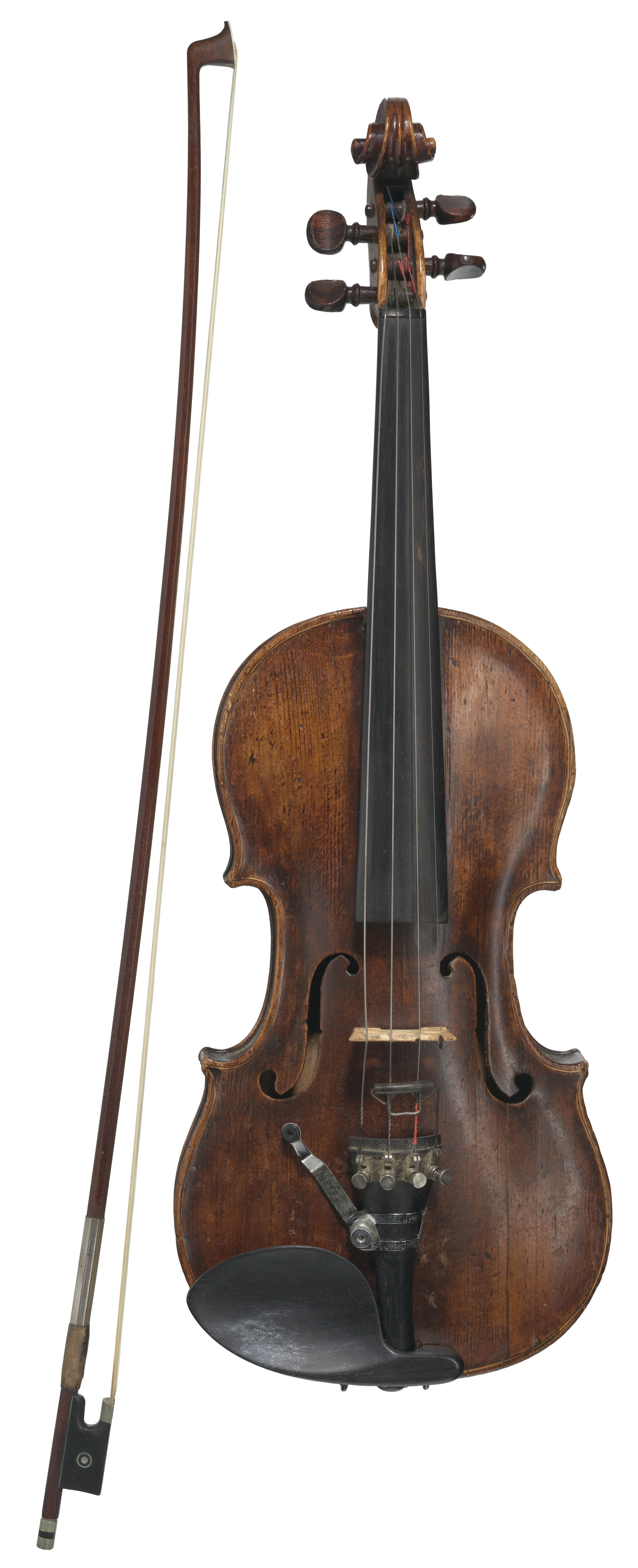
Smock's violin, at the Smithsonian

Born in Chicago, Smock, who was of African American heritage, was orphaned at the age of 6 and grew up in Los Angeles, graduating from Jefferson High School. She studied violin privately with Bessie Dones, and at the age of 10 appeared as a soloist at the Hollywood Bowl. She was featured on Clarence Muse's radio program at the age of thirteen performing Edward MacDowell's To a Wild Rose. She earned degrees in music from Los Angeles City College, and the Zoellner Conservatory of Music. At the latter institution she was a pupil of Edith Smith.

During 1944 she was leading a trio, with Nina Russell and Mata Roy. In 1951, she led an all-female sextette, featuring Clora Bryant, on the Chicks and the Fiddle show hosted by Phil Moore that broadcast for six weeks on CBS. In 1952, she was the featured soloist on KTLA's variety show, Dixie Showboat.

On March 31, 1953, Smock recorded as part of a group, with Gerald Wiggins, Freddie Simon, Red Callender, and Rudy Pitts, accompanying the vocalist Cecil "Count" Carter.

Beginning in the mid-1970s, she spent ten years as concertmaster of show orchestras in Las Vegas.

A violin owned by Smock is in the collection of the National Museum of African American History and Culture.

== Recordings ==
- Ginger Smock: Studio and Demo Recordings 1946-1958 (AB Fable, 2005)
