= Feelin's (Teddy Edwards album) =

Studio album by Teddy Edwards
- Released: 1975
- Recorded: March 25, 1974
- Studios: Los Angeles, CA
- Genre: Jazz
- Length: 39:55
- Labels: Muse; MR 5045
- Producer: Don Schlitten

Teddy Edwards chronology
It's All Right! (1967)	Feelin's (1975)	The Inimitable Teddy Edwards (1976)

Feelin's is an album by saxophonist Teddy Edwards which was recorded in 1974 and first released on the Muse label.

== Reception ==
Professional ratings
Review scores
Source	Rating
Allmusic	4/5 stars

In his review on Allmusic, Ken Dryden notes that "Teddy Edwards had not made a recording as a leader for quite a while at the time of this 1974 studio session for Muse, though after hearing this recording, one wonders why it took so long for someone to sign him. Focusing primarily on originals that mix hard bop and soul-jazz with a slight Latin flavor, the tenor saxophonist leads a fine sextet ."

== Track listing ==
All compositions by Teddy Edwards except where noted.

1. "Bear Tracks" – 6:44
2. "April Love" – 6:55
3. "Ritta Ditta Blues" (Ray Brown) – 8:06
4. "Eleven Twenty Three" – 5:51
5. "Georgia on My Mind" (Hoagy Carmichael, Stuart Gorrell) – 6:53
6. "The Blue Sombrero" – 5:26

== Personnel ==
- Teddy Edwards – tenor saxophone
- Conte Candoli – trumpet
- Dolo Coker – piano
- Ray Brown – bass
- Frank Butler – drums
- Jerry Steinholz – congas, percussion
