= Sunset Eyes 2000 =

Studio album by Saskia Laroo and Teddy Edwards with Ernie Andrews
- Released: July 10, 1999
- Recorded: 1999
- Studio: Private Island Trax, Holloywood, CA
- Genre: Jazz
- Length: 60:39
- Label: Laroo; SL9902
- Producer: Saskia Laroo, Teddy Edwards

Saskia Laroo chronology
Jazzkia (1999)	Sunset Eyes 2000 (1999)	Really Jazzy (2008)

Teddy Edwards chronology
Midnight Creeper (1996)	Sunset Eyes 2000 (1999)	Ladies Man (2000)

Sunset Eyes 2000 is an album by trumpeter Saskia Laroo and saxophonist Teddy Edwards which was recorded in 1999, and released on the Laroo label.

== Reception ==
Professional ratings
Review scores
Source	Rating
Allmusic	3/5 stars

In his review on Allmusic, Alex Henderson states "Sunset Eyes 2000 falls short of being a gem, but it's a satisfying, decent effort that bop fans will enjoy".

== Track listing ==
All compositions by Teddy Edwards except where noted

1. "Nothin' But the Truth" – 6:01
2. "Moving In" – 5:04
3. "There Is No Greater Love" (Isham Jones, Marty Symes) – 6:12
4. "Sunset Eyes" – 5:30
5. "Cheek to Cheek" (Irving Berlin) – 6:56
6. "Don't Touch Me" – 5:38
7. "The Blue Sombrero" – 4:56
8. "I Got It Bad' (Duke Ellington, Paul Francis Webster) – 3:43
9. "Wheelin' and Dealin'" – 4:24
10. "Blue Bossa" (Kenny Dorham) – 7:35
11. "Sunset Eyes Latin" – 4:40

== Personnel ==
- Saskia Laroo – trumpet (tracks 1–7 & 9–11)
- Teddy Edwards – tenor saxophone (tracks 1, 2 & 4–11)
- Ernie Andrews – vocals (tracks 4, 6 & 11)
- Art Hillery – piano
- Wendell Williams – bass
- Gerryck King – drums
