= Wise in Time =

Studio album by Howard McGhee and Teddy Edwards
- Released: 1979
- Recorded: October 4–5, 1979
- Studio: Spectrum Studios, Venice, CA
- Genre: Jazz
- Length: 40:03
- Label: Storyville; SLP 4081
- Producer: Lars Johansen

Howard McGhee chronology
Young at Heart (1978)	Wise in Time (1979)

Teddy Edwards chronology
Young at Heart (1978)	Wise in Time (1978)	Out of This World (1980)

Wise in Time is an album by trumpeter Howard McGhee and saxophonist Teddy Edwards recorded in 1978 and released on the Storyville label.

== Reception ==
Professional ratings
Review scores
Source	Rating
AllMusic	4/5 stars
The Penguin Guide to Jazz Recordings	3.5/4 stars

In his review for AllMusic, Scott Yanow stated "Originating from the same recording sessions (trumpeter Howard McGhee's last) that resulted in its superior companion Young at Heart, this set is a bit of a disappointment. McGhee, tenor saxophonist Teddy Edwards, pianist Art Hillery, bassist Leroy Vinnegar and drummer Billy Higgins all sounded fine on the other record but this album sticks exclusively to ballads and the results are dragging and a bit dreary".

== Track listing ==
1. "I Want to Talk About You" (Billy Eckstine) – 5:59
2. "I Remember Clifford" (Benny Golson) – 7:55
3. "If You Could See Me Now" (Tadd Dameron, Carl Sigman) – 5:58
4. "Crescent" (John Coltrane) – 6:57
5. "Ruby, My Dear" (Thelonious Monk) – 7:35
6. "Time Waits" (Bud Powell) – 5:02

== Personnel ==
- Howard McGhee – trumpet
- Teddy Edwards – tenor saxophone
- Art Hillery – piano
- Leroy Vinnegar – bass
- Billy Higgins – drums
