= Mississippi Lad =

Studio album by Teddy Edwards featuring Tom Waits
- Released: 1991
- Recorded: March 13 & 14, 1991
- Studio: Sunset Sound Recorders, Hollywood, CA
- Genre: Jazz
- Length: 57:25
- Label: Verve/Gitanes; 511 111-2
- Producer: Jean-Philippe Allard

Teddy Edwards chronology
Good Gravy (1981)	Mississippi Lad (1991)	Blue Saxophone (1992)

Mississippi Lad is an album by saxophonist Teddy Edwards featuring Tom Waits on two tracks which was recorded in 1991 and originally released on the French Verve/Gitanes label in Europe and on Antilles Records in the US. The album was Edwards' first recording in a decade.

Professional ratings
Review scores
Source	Rating
AllMusic	3/5 stars

== Track listing ==
All compositions by Teddy Edwards

1. "Little Man" – 4:39
2. "Safari Walk" – 7:43
3. "The Blue Sombrero" – 6:13
4. "Mississippi Lad" – 6:44
5. "Three Base Hit" – 7:13
6. "I'm Not Your Fool Anymore" – 5:02
7. "Symphony on Central" – 6:36
8. "Ballad for a Bronze Beauty" – 5:12
9. "The Call of Love" – 8:22

== Personnel ==
- Teddy Edwards – tenor saxophone, arranger
- Tom Waits – vocals, guitar (tracks 1 & 6)
- Nolan Smith – trumpet
- Jimmy Cleveland – trombone
- Art Hillery – piano
- Leroy Vinnegar – bass
- Billy Higgins – drums
- Ray Armando – percussion
