= Good Gravy =

Live album by Teddy Edwards Quartet
- Released: 1982
- Recorded: December 26, 1981
- Venues: Bimhuis, Amsterdam, Holland
- Genre: Jazz
- Length: 40:30
- Labels: Timeless; SJP 139
- Producer: Wim Wigt

Teddy Edwards chronology
Out of This World (1980)	Good Gravy (1982)	Mississippi Lad (1991)

Good Gravy is a live album by saxophonist Teddy Edwards recorded at the Bimhuis in 1981 and released on the Timeless label.

== Reception ==
Professional ratings
Review scores
Source	Rating
AllMusic	4/5 stars

In his review for AllMusic, Scott Yanow stated "This obscure live CD features the underrated tenor saxophonist Teddy Edwards in top form stretching out on three standards ... Edwards builds up his solos expertly and plenty of sparks fly. Recommended".

== Track listing ==
1. "Oh, Lady Be Good!" (George Gershwin, Ira Gershwin) – 14:48
2. "Oleo" (Sonny Rollins) – 5:53
3. "Georgia" (Hoagy Carmichael, Stuart Gorrell) – 10:47
4. "Good Gravy" (Teddy Edwards) – 9:01

== Personnel ==
- Teddy Edwards – tenor saxophone
- Rein de Graaff – piano
- Henk Haverhoek – bass
- John Engels – drums
