= Horn to Horn =

Studio album by Teddy Edwards and Houston Person
- Released: 1996
- Recorded: December 27, 1994
- Studio: Van Gelder Studio, Englewood Cliffs, NJ
- Genre: Jazz
- Length: 56:27
- Label: Muse; MCD 5540
- Producer: Houston Person

Teddy Edwards chronology
| Tango in Harlem (1994) | Horn to Horn (1996) | Close Encounters (1996) |

Houston Person chronology
| Christmas with Houston Person and Friends (1994) | Horn to Horn (1994) | Close Encounters (1996) |

Horn to Horn is an album by saxophonists Teddy Edwards and Houston Person which was recorded in 1994 and first released on the Muse label in 1996.

== Reception ==
Professional ratings
Review scores
| Source | Rating |
|---|---|
| Allmusic | 3.5/5 stars |

In his review on Allmusic, Scott Yanow notes that "This is a logical and very successful collaboration featuring the East Coast tenor Houston Person and L.A.'s legendary Teddy Edwards. Although one can generally tell the two veterans apart (Person has a heavier sound than the comparatively light-toned Edwards), the co-leaders are quite complementary and work together well in the tradition of Sonny Stitt and Gene Ammons ... Edwards and Person pay tribute to eight great tenors of the past (John Coltrane, Ben Webster, Lester Young, Stan Getz, Coleman Hawkins, Gene Ammons, Dexter Gordon, and Eddie "Lockjaw" Davis) through their renditions of eight standards ... Recommended"

== Track listing ==
1. "Equinox" (John Coltrane) – 7:57
2. "That's All" (Bob Haymes, Alan Brandt) – 6:28
3. "Lester Leaps In" (Lester Young) – 5:18
4. "The Girl from Ipanema" (Antônio Carlos Jobim, Vinícius de Moraes, Norman Gimbel) – 6:58
5. "Body and Soul" (Johnny Green, Frank Eyton, Edward Heyman, Robert Sour) – 7:20
6. "Red Top" (Woody Herman) – 7:42
7. "Talk of the Town" (Jerry Livingston, Al J. Neiburg, Marty Symes) – 6:57
8. "Out of Nowhere" (Green, Edward Heyman) – 7:47

== Personnel ==
- Teddy Edwards, Houston Person – tenor saxophone
- Richard Wyands – piano
- Peter Washington – bass
- Kenny Washington – drums
