= Back to Avalon (Teddy Edwards album) =

Studio album by Teddy Edwards
- Released: 1995
- Recorded: December 7–8 & 13, 1960
- Studios: Los Angeles, CA
- Genre: Jazz
- Length: 45:52
- Labels: Contemporary; CONCD 14074
- Producer: Lester Koenig

Teddy Edwards chronology
Teddy's Ready! (1960)	Back to Avalon (1995)	Together Again!!!! (1961)

Back to Avalon is an album by the saxophonist Teddy Edwards, recorded in 1960 for the Contemporary label. The results were shelved and not released until 1995.

== Reception ==
Professional ratings
Review scores
Source	Rating
AllMusic	3.5/5 stars
The Penguin Guide to Jazz Recordings	3/4 stars

AllMusic stated: "There are recordings that rank as underrated or under appreciated, but Back to Avalon should not merely be tagged as such. Thankfully—through hindsight—this recording was released in fully flowered form so all can realize what a marvelous all-around musician Teddy Edwards was".

== Track listing ==
All compositions by Teddy Edwards except as indicated

1. "Avalon" (Buddy DeSylva, Al Jolson, Vincent Rose) - 2:49
2. "The Cellar Dweller" - 5:34
3. "You Don't Know What Love Is" (Gene de Paul, Don Raye) - 4:25
4. "Steppin' Lightly" - 7:20
5. "Sweet Georgia Brown" (Ben Bernie, Kenneth Casey, Maceo Pinkard) - 3:47
6. "Our Last Goodbye" - 4:41
7. "Good Gravy" - 6:32
8. "Under a Southern Moon and Sky" - 5:16
9. "Avalon" [alternate take] (DeSylva, Jolson, Rose) - 2:28

== Personnel ==
- Teddy Edwards - tenor saxophone
- Nathaniel Meeks - trumpet
- Lester Robertson - trombone
- Jimmy Woods - alto saxophone
- Modesto Brisenio - baritone saxophone
- Danny Horton - piano
- Roger Alderson - bass
- Larance Marable - drums
