= It's All Right! (Teddy Edwards album) =

Studio album by Teddy Edwards
- Released: 1967
- Recorded: May 24 & 27, 1967; New York City
- Genre: Jazz
- Length: 42:01
- Label: Prestige; PR 7522
- Producer: Don Schlitten

Teddy Edwards chronology
Nothin' But the Truth! (1966)	It's All Right! (1967)	Feelin's (1974)

It's All Right! is an album by the saxophonist Teddy Edwards which was recorded in 1967 and released on the Prestige label.

== Reception ==
Professional ratings
Review scores
Source	Rating
AllMusic	3/5 stars
The Penguin Guide to Jazz Recordings	3/4 stars
DownBeat	4/5 stars
The Virgin Encyclopedia of Jazz	3/5 stars

AllMusic awarded the album 3 stars stating, "Although the music (mostly Edwards originals) is essentially hard bop, there are hints of the avant-garde here and there in the harmonies and solos... Edwards would not have an opportunity to record as a leader for another seven years, but the largely straight-ahead music has dated pretty well."

The authors of The Penguin Guide to Jazz Recordings wrote: "some of the material points in the direction of Coltrane and even Ornette Coleman; though never remotely avant-garde, Teddy knew what was happening on the scene... he was able to combine his usual easy, blues-inflected swing with something harder and darker."

Writing for DownBeat, Dan Morgenstern commented: "The session was perfectly cast, and it adds up to a generous helping of well-crafted, well-played contemporary jazz without convenient labels... All told, a feather in Edwards'... cap."

== Track listing ==
All compositions by Teddy Edwards

1. "It's All Right" - 5:18
2. "Going Home" - 5:00
3. "Afraid of Love" - 5:05
4. "Wheelin' and Dealin'" - 6:53
5. "Mamacita Lisa" - 4:24
6. "Back Alley Blues" - 4:29
7. "The Cellar Dweller" - 4:54
8. "Moving In" - 5:58

== Personnel ==
- Teddy Edwards - tenor saxophone
- Jimmy Owens - trumpet, flugelhorn
- Garnett Brown - trombone
- Cedar Walton - piano
- Ben Tucker - double bass
- Lenny McBrowne - drums
