= Clora Bryant =

American jazz musician (1927–2019)

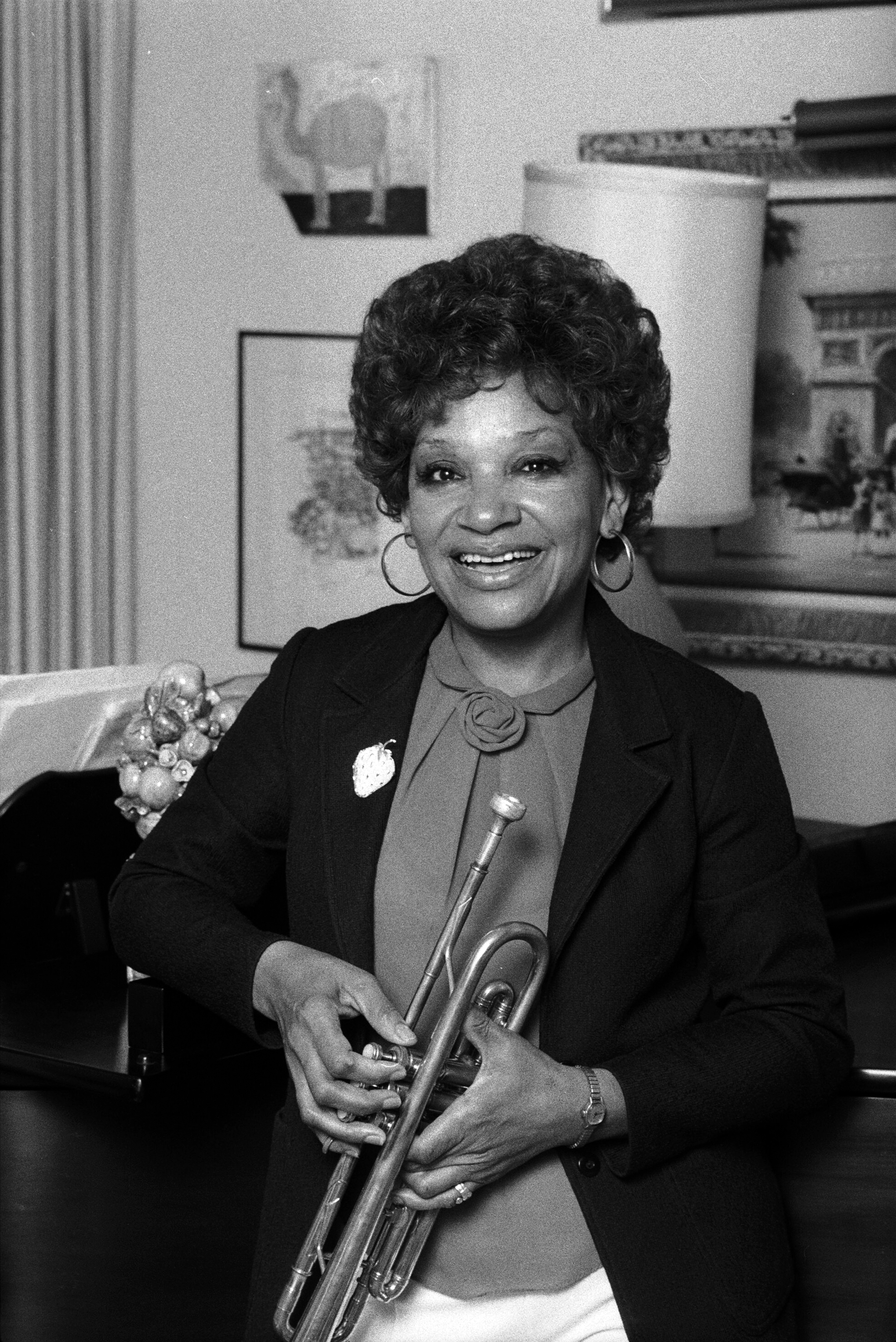
- Bryant in 1982

Background information
- Born: Clora Larea Bryant; May 30, 1927; Denison, Texas, U.S.
- Died: August 25, 2019 (aged 92) Los Angeles, California, U.S.
- Genres: Jazz
- Occupation: Musician
- Instruments: Trumpet, vocals

Clora Larea Bryant (May 30, 1927 – August 25, 2019) was an American jazz trumpeter. She was the only female trumpeter to perform with Dizzy Gillespie and Charlie Parker and was a member of the International Sweethearts of Rhythm.

== Early life ==
Bryant was born in Denison, Texas to Charles and Eulila Bryant, the youngest of three children. Her father was a day laborer and her mother was a homemaker who died when Clora was only 3 years old. When Bryant was a young child, she learned to play piano with her brother Mel. As a child, Bryant was a member of the choir in a Baptist church. When her brother Fred joined the military, he left his trumpet, which she learned how to play. In high school she played trumpet in the marching band.

== Career ==
Bryant turned down scholarships from Oberlin Conservatory and Bennett College to attend Prairie View College in Houston starting in 1943, where she was a member of the Prairie View Co-eds jazz band. The band toured in Texas and performed at the Apollo Theater in New York City in 1944. Her father got a job in Los Angeles, and she transferred to UCLA in 1945. Bryant heard bebop for the first time on Central Avenue.

In 1946 she became a member of the International Sweethearts of Rhythm, an all-female jazz band, earned her union card and dropped out of school. Dizzy Gillespie became her mentor and provided her with work. She joined the black female jazz band the Queens of Swing as a drummer, and went on tour with the band.

In 1951 she worked in Los Angeles as a trumpeter for Josephine Baker and Billie Holiday. Two years later she moved to New York City.

The Queens of Swing performed on television in 1951 as The Hollywood Sepia Tones, in a half-hour variety program on KTLA. They were the first women's jazz group to appear on television. After six weeks the show was dropped due to lack of a sponsor. During filming Bryant was about seven months pregnant. After her daughter's birth she was called onto Ada Leonard's all-girl orchestra show; however, she only stayed for a week after calls demanding to "get that nigger off there". In 1954 she briefly moved to New York because she had lost inspiration from playing in bands.

In 1951, she was a member of an all-female sextet led by Ginger Smock that was broadcast for six weeks on CBS.

Bryant recorded her first and only album, Gal with a Horn, in 1957 before returning to the life of a traveling musician. She worked often at clubs in Chicago and Denver. In Las Vegas she performed with Louis Armstrong and Harry James. She toured with singer Billy Williams and accompanied him on The Ed Sullivan Show. During the 1960s and 1970s, she toured around the world with her brother Mel, who was a singer, and they had a TV show in Australia. In 1989 Bryant became the first female jazz musician to tour in the Soviet Union after writing to Mikhail Gorbachev.

After a heart attack and quadruple bypass surgery in 1996, Bryant was forced to give up the trumpet but she continued to sing. She also began to give lectures on college campuses about the history of jazz, co-edited a book on jazz history in Los Angeles titled Central Avenue Sounds: Jazz in Los Angeles, and worked with children in Los Angeles elementary schools. In 2002, she received a lifetime achievement award (the Mary Lou Williams Women in Jazz Award) from the Kennedy Center in Washington, D.C. Two years later a documentary about her was released.

In an interview with JazzTimes, Bryant said, "Nobody ever told me, 'You can't play the trumpet, you're a girl.' Not when I got started in high school and not when I came out to L.A. My father told me, 'It's going to be a challenge, but if you're going to do it, I'm behind you all the way.' And he was."

== Personal life and death ==
Bryant married bassist Joe Stone in the 1940s and the couple had two children, April and Charles Stone. That marriage ended in divorce. Bryant had two additional children from her relationship with drummer Leslie Milton; Kevin and Darrin Milton.

Bryant died at Cedars-Sinai Medical Center in Los Angeles on August 25, 2019, after suffering a heart attack at home. At the time of her death, she had nine grandchildren and five great-grandchildren.

== Discography ==
- Gal with a Horn (1957)
- The Billy Williams Revue (1960): Two solo tracks

== Filmography ==
- 1968: The Rosey Grier Show (TV show) season 1, episode 18 "Clora Bryant, Sam Fletcher" includes a featured guest appearance by Bryant
- 2000: Mysteries and Scandals (TV show) season 3, episode 25 "Humphrey Bogart" includes a segment with Bryant
- 2005: Trumpetistically, Clora Bryant (video short directed by Zeinabu Irene Davis) with Bryant as featured subject
- 2010: Leimert Park Voices (documentary film co-directed by Paul Calderon and Alan Swyer) includes interview segment with Bryant
- 2011: The Girls in the Band (documentary film directed by Judy Chaikin) includes Bryant as a featured musician
- 2014: Sound of Redemption: The Frank Morgan Story (documentary film directed by N.C. Heiken) includes appearance by Bryant
