= Young at Heart (Howard McGhee and Teddy Edwards album) =

Studio album by Howard McGhee and Teddy Edwards
- Released: 1983
- Recorded: October 4–5, 1979
- Studio: Spectrum Studio, Venice, CA
- Genre: Jazz
- Length: 41:25
- Label: Storyville; SLP 4080
- Producer: Lars Johansen

Howard McGhee chronology
Home Run (1978)	Young at Heart (1983)	Wise in Time (1979)

Teddy Edwards chronology
The Inimitable Teddy Edwards (1976)	Young at Heart (1979)	Wise in Time (1979)

Young at Heart is an album by trumpeter Howard McGhee and saxophonist Teddy Edwards recorded in 1979 and released on the Storyville label.

== Reception ==
Professional ratings
Review scores
Source	Rating
AllMusic	4/5 stars

In his review for AllMusic, Scott Yanow stated "Tenor saxophonist Teddy Edwards was in trumpeter Howard McGhee's group during 1945-47. Over 30 years later they reunited for what would be McGhee's final recording sessions (although the trumpeter lived until 1987). ... McGhee and Edwards are in excellent form on a set filled with bop standards".

== Track listing ==
1. "Relaxing at Camarillo" (Charlie Parker) – 7:36
2. "Reflections" (Thelonious Monk) – 6:36
3. "Blues in the Closet" (Oscar Pettiford) – 7:27
4. "On a Misty Night" (Tadd Dameron) – 4:32
5. "In Walked Bud" (Monk) – 4:07
6. "Yardbird Suite" (Parker) – 4:07
7. "Moose the Mooche" (Parker) – 7:00

== Personnel ==
- Howard McGhee – trumpet
- Teddy Edwards – tenor saxophone
- Art Hillery – piano
- Leroy Vinnegar – bass
- Billy Higgins – drums
