= La Villa: Live in Paris =

Live album by Teddy Edwards Quartet
- Released: 1994
- Recorded: November 4 and 8, 1993
- Studio: La Villa jazz club, Paris, France
- Genre: Jazz
- Length: 71:38
- Label: Verve/Gitanes; 523 495-2
- Producer: Daniel Richard, Jean-Philippe Allard

Teddy Edwards chronology
Blue Saxophone (1992)	La Villa: Live in Paris (1994)	Tango in Harlem (1994)

La Villa: Live in Paris is a live album by saxophonist Teddy Edwards which was recorded in Paris in 1993 and released on the French Verve/Gitanes label the following year.

Professional ratings
Review scores
Source	Rating
AllMusic	3/5 stars

== Track listing ==
All compositions by Teddy Edwards except where noted

1. "Juuls Delight" – 6:46
2. "Lee-Ann" – 6:25
3. "Lover Man (Oh, Where Can You Be?)" (Jimmy Davis, Ram Ramirez, James Sherman) – 7:18
4. "What'cha Gonna Do" – 3:06
5. "Madly in Love with You" – 3:59
6. "French Basstry" – 7:36
7. "If We Ever Said Good-Bye" – 5:59
8. "Get Up and Get It" – 5:18
9. "At the La Villa" – 7:28
10. "April Love" – 4:13
11. "L.A. After Dark/Good Gravy" – 13:30

== Personnel ==
- Teddy Edwards – tenor saxophone, arranger
- Alain Jean-Marie – piano
- Thomas Bramerie – bass
- Alvester Garnett – drums
- Christian Escoudé – guitar (tracks 1, 2, 6–9 & 11)
- Spanky Wilson – vocals (tracks 4, 5, 9 & 10)
- String section conducted by Maurice Cevrero (tracks 2, 4, 5, 7 & 10)
  - Frédéric Laroque – concertmaster
  - Carole Saint Michel, Guillaume Fontanarosa, Jean-Claude Tcheurekdjian, Karen Strugg, Laurence Dupuis, Maxime Tholance, Patrice Mondon, Yves Melon – violin
  - Frédéric Gondot, Laurent Puchar, Ludovic Michel – viola
  - Jean-Luc Bourré, Laurent Cirade, Raphaël Pidoux – cello
