= Arv Garrison =

American jazz guitarist (1922–1960)

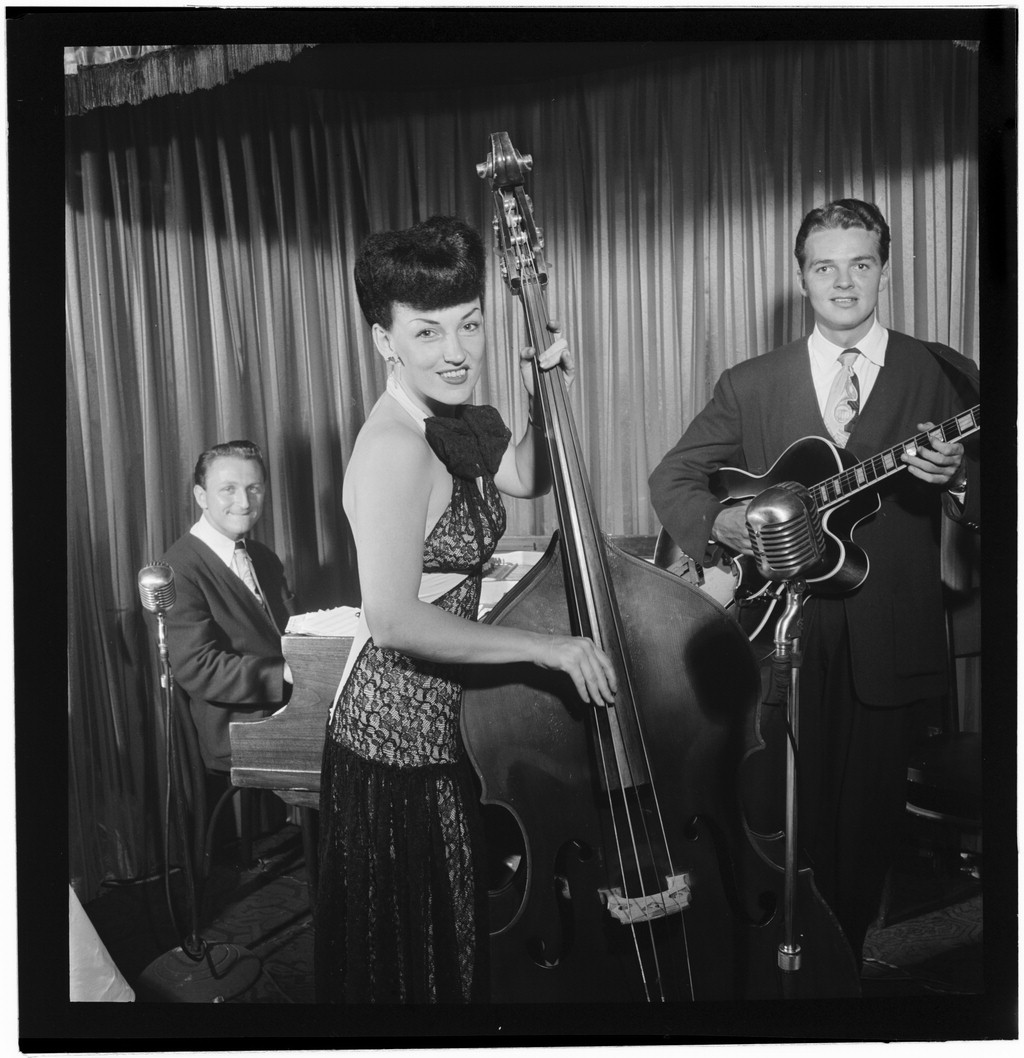
- Teddy Kaye, Vivien Garry, and Arv Garrison c. 1947; William P. Gottlieb, Library of Congress

Background information
- Birth name: Arvin Charles Garrison
- Born: August 17, 1922; Toledo, Ohio, U.S.
- Died: July 30, 1960 (aged 37); Toledo
- Genres: Jazz
- Occupation: Musician
- Instrument: Guitar

Arvin Charles Garrison (August 17, 1922 – July 30, 1960) was an American jazz guitarist. He was born in Toledo, Ohio, and spent most of his life there.

Garrison taught himself ukulele at age nine and played guitar for dances and local functions beginning at the age of twelve. He led his own band at a hotel in Albany, New York, in 1941. He married a double bassist and performed with her in a group under her name, the Vivien Garry Trio. They recorded one album.

In 1946, Garrison recorded sessions with Charlie Parker and Dizzy Gillespie in Los Angeles, sharing the studio with Miles Davis, Dodo Marmarosa, and Lucky Thompson. As part of the Earle Spencer orchestra, he played in a guitar section that included Irving Ashby and Barney Kessel.

In the 1950s he returned to Toledo and played locally. In 1960, while he was swimming, he died when he had an epileptic seizure in the water.

== Discography ==
- Vivien Garry Quartet, Central Avenue Breakdown Vol. 1 (Onyx, 1974) split album with Teddy Edwards and Dodo Marmarosa; includes "Hopscotch", "I Surrender Dear", "Where You At", "I've Got To, That's All", "Tonsillectomy", and "These Foolish Things" recorded 1945 for Sarco Records in Hollywood, California
- Swing to Bop Guitar: Guitars in Flight 1939–1947 (Hep, 2000) various artists CD anthology; includes Garrison's "Five Guitars in Flight" recorded 1946 for Black & White Records with Earle Spencer's Orchestra)
- Charlie Parker, The Complete Charlie Parker Vol. 2: Now's The Time 1945–1946 (Frémeaux & Associés, 2011)
- The Complete Dial Modern Jazz Sessions (Mosaic, 2014) various artists 9-CD box set; includes Garrison's February 1946 Dial Records session with Dizzy Gillespie's Tempo Jazzmen, his March 1946 session with Charlie Parker's septet, and his October 1946 session with the Howard McGhee/Dodo Marmarosa Sextet
- The Unknown Arv Garrison: Wizard of the Six String (Fresh Sound, 2021) various artists 3-CD box set
