= Sunset Eyes =

Studio album by Teddy Edwards
- Released: 1960
- Recorded: March 21 & 23 and August 16, 1960
- Studio: Rex Productions Studio, Hollywood, CA
- Genre: Jazz
- Length: 46:40
- Label: Pacific Jazz; PJ 14
- Producer: Richard Bock

Teddy Edwards chronology
It's About Time (1959)	Sunset Eyes (1960)	Teddy's Ready! (1960)

Sunset Eyes is an album by saxophonist Teddy Edwards recorded in 1960 and released on the Pacific Jazz label.

== Reception ==
Professional ratings
Review scores
Source	Rating
Allmusic	4/5 stars
The Penguin Guide to Jazz Recordings	3/4 stars

Allmusic reviewer Scott Yanow stated: "Since the great Teddy Edwards never recorded an uninspiring record, this date is easily recommended to fans of straight-ahead jazz".

== Track listing ==
All compositions by Teddy Edwards except as indicated

1. "Tempo de Blues" - 4:46
2. "Vintage '57" (Leroy Vinnegar) - 7:12
3. "I Hear a Rhapsody" (Jack Baker, George Fragos, Dick Gasparre) - 3:32
4. "Up in Teddy's New Flat" - 3:06
5. "Sunset Eyes" - 5:26
6. "Teddy's Tune" - 6:11
7. "Takin' Off" - 6:32
8. "The New Symphony Sid" (King Pleasure) - 2:16 Bonus track on CD reissue
9. "My Kinda Blues" - 5:11 Bonus track on CD reissue
10. "Takin' Off" [First Version] - 2:28 Bonus track on CD reissue

Recorded in Los Angeles on August 16, 1959 (track 1), March 21, 1960 (tracks 3 & 8–10) and August 16, 1960 (tracks 2 & 4–7).

== Personnel ==
- Teddy Edwards - tenor saxophone
- Ronnie Ball (track 1), Joe Castro (tracks 2 & 4–7), Amos Trice (tracks 3 & 8–10) - piano
- Leroy Vinnegar (tracks 2–10), Ben Tucker (track 1) - bass
- Billy Higgins (tracks 2–10), Al Levitt (track 1) - drums
