= Groove Funk Soul =

Studio album by Joe Castro
- Released: 1960
- Recorded: July 18 & 19, 1959; Radio Recorders, Los Angeles, CA
- Genre: Jazz
- Label: Atlantic; LP 1324

Joe Castro chronology
Mood Jazz (1957)	Groove Funk Soul (1960)	Lush Life (1960)

Groove Funk Soul was the second album led by American jazz pianist Joe Castro which was released on the Atlantic label in 1960.

== Reception ==
Professional ratings
Review scores
Source	Rating
Allmusic	3/5 stars

Allmusic gave the album 3 stars.

== Track listing ==
1. "Groove Funk Soul" (Joe Castro) - 5:38
2. "Yesterdays" (Jerome Kern, Otto Harbach) - 7:19
3. "Day Dream" (Billy Strayhorn, Duke Ellington, John La Touche) - 6:59
4. "It Could Happen To You" (Jimmy Van Heusen, Johnny Burke) - 3:31
5. "Play Me the Blues" (Teddy Edwards) - 9:17
6. "That's All" (Alan Brandt, Bob Haymes) - 5:12

== Personnel ==
- Joe Castro - piano
- Teddy Edwards - tenor saxophone (tracks 1–5)
- Leroy Vinnegar - bass (tracks 1–5)
- Billy Higgins - drums (tracks 1–5)
