= Central Avenue (Los Angeles) =

Street in Los Angeles, California, United States

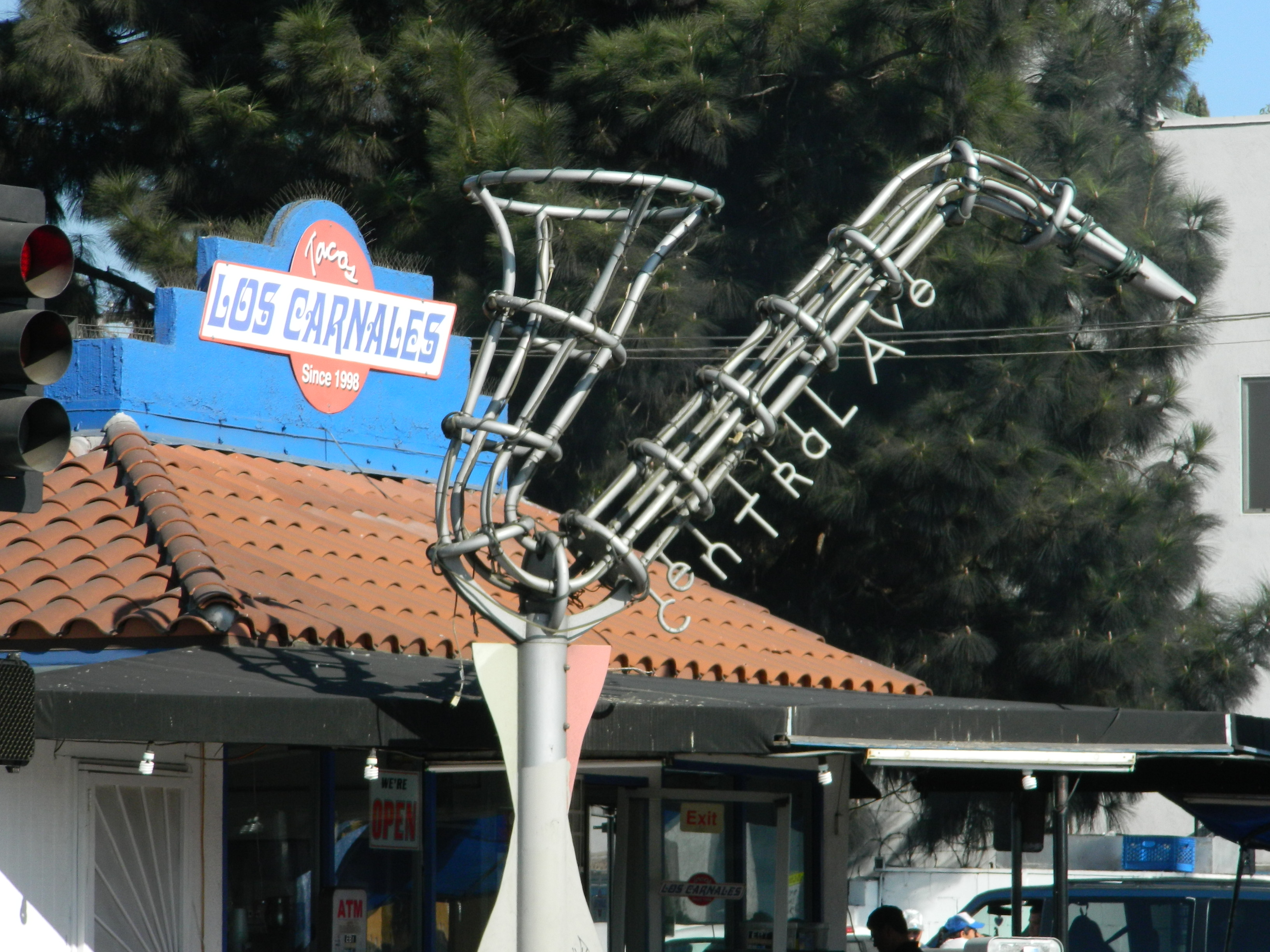
Central Ave Saxophone Market celebrating Central's jazzy history in Los Angeles.

Central Avenue is a major north–south thoroughfare in the central portion of the Los Angeles, California, metropolitan area. Located just to the west of the Alameda Corridor, it runs south from the eastern end of the Los Angeles Civic Center down to the east side of California State University, Dominguez Hills, and terminating at East Del Amo Boulevard in Carson.

From north to south, Central Avenue passes through Downtown Los Angeles, the areas of South Los Angeles (including Watts, Florence-Graham, Willowbrook), the city of Compton, and the city of Carson, which is part of the 17-city South Bay area of Los Angeles County.

== History ==
Central Avenue had two all-black segregated fire stations. Fire Station No. 30 and Fire Station No. 14 were segregated in 1924. They remained segregated until 1956 when the Los Angeles Fire Department was integrated. The listing on the National Register says, "All-black fire stations were simultaneous representations of racial segregation and sources of community pride."

=== Significance in music history ===
From approximately 1920 to 1955, Central Avenue was the heart of the African-American community in Los Angeles, with active rhythm and blues and jazz music scenes. Local luminaries included Eric Dolphy, Art Pepper, Chico Hamilton, Clora Bryant, and Charles Mingus. Other jazz and R&B musicians associated with Central Avenue in LA include Benny Carter, Buddy Collette, Dexter Gordon, Lionel Hampton, Hampton Hawes, Big Jay McNeely, Johnny Otis, Shifty Henry, Charlie Parker (briefly), Gerald Wilson, Anthony Ortega, Onzy Matthews and Teddy Wilson. Commenting on its historical prominence, Wynton Marsalis once remarked that "Central Avenue was the 52nd Street of Los Angeles." Although Central Avenue is no longer the thriving jazz center it was, its legacy is preserved by the Central Avenue Jazz Festival and a small number of jazz clubs, including Bluewhale in Little Tokyo.

Leon Hefflin, Sr. produced the first largest outdoor jazz entertainment event of its kind, the “Cavalcade of Jazz,” held at Wrigley Field which was located on 42nd place in Los Angeles, part of the Central Ave Jazz Scene and showcased over 125 artists from 1945 to 1958. The Cavalcade of Jazz concerts were the stepping stone to success for such stars as Toni Harper, Dinah Washington, Roy Milton, Frankie Lane and others. He also hosted a beauty contest at the events. His first COJ show starred Count Basie, The Honey Drippers, Valaida Snow, Joe Turner, The Peters Sisters, Slim and Bam and more artists on September 23, 1945 with a crowd of 15,000.

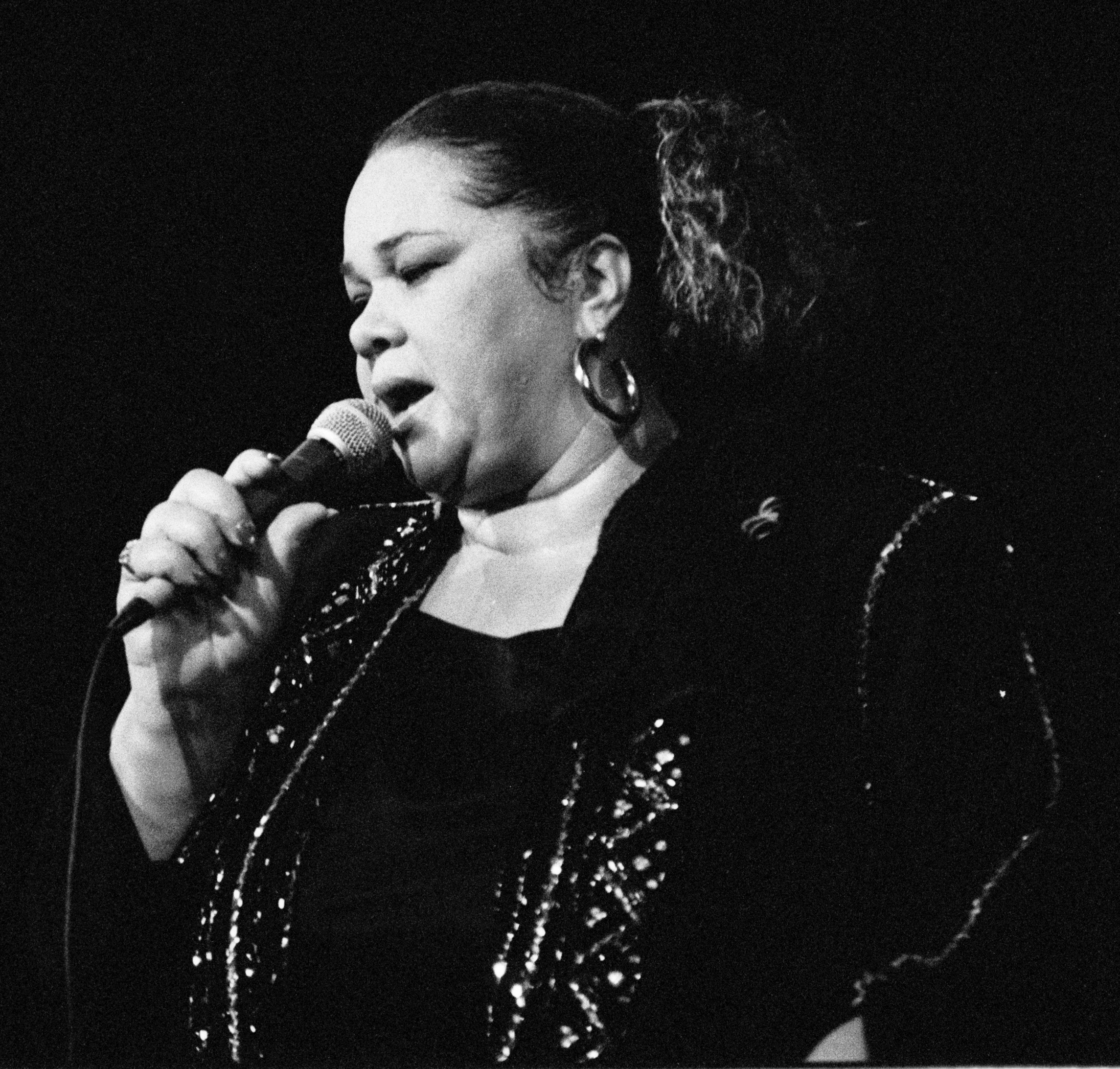
Etta James.

Jefferson High School, located south east of Downtown Los Angeles, served as a school to a community that not only was located at the heart of South Central’s jazz scene at the time (in the 1930s), but also one that nurtured Jazz-affluent students. These students, who would later go on to establish themselves as either jazz/blues artists/singers, would follow robust music curriculum, which included courses in music theory, music appreciation, harmony, counterpoint, orchestra, band and choir. Many of Central Avenue’s most accomplished jazz, blues, and bebop players were graduates of this public high school just off the Avenue. The origin of jazz in Los Angeles has been attributed to a number of musicians who moved there from New Orleans. Nightclubs became the physical manifestation of jazz music, and these were mainly located along Central Avenue from Little Tokyo to Watts. The school produced many prominent musicians, including Etta James, Curtis Williams, Big Jay McNeely, and Richard Berry.

Jefferson High School served as a pivotal structure to a newly established African-American enclave after the turn of the 20th century. The same way many know Harlem as a historically African-American enclave, the area in and around Central Ave was ironically referred to as “Little Harlem” due to its striking similarities. Harlem’s Apollo theatre and its importance to the neighborhood can be taken by the same token in referring to the many Jazz clubs on Central Ave. However, in this case, looking at the ethnographic nature of Central Ave and its establishing of a Jazz scene and culture, Jefferson High School’s contribution cannot be overstated. Such an institution served in nurturing students, musicians, and athletes—all the while sparking an inevitable culture of Jazz within the already affluent Jazz population.

Central Ave paved way for many historic happenings in Los Angeles, most importantly being the many significant structures that contributed to both the creation of an African-American enclave and Jazz scene on the West Coast. It was in 1920, when the Jazz scene on Central began to swing, and from 1920 to 1955 it was the heart of the African-American community in Los Angeles.

Lionel Hampton composed and performed a tune called "Central Avenue Breakdown". Dave Alvin's tribute to Big Joe Turner, "The Boss of the Blues", describes a drive down Central Avenue and Turner's reminiscences about the scene. Lionel Hampton performed for the 2nd, 5th, 6th, 7th and the 11th Cavalcade of Jazz concerts. The crowning of the first Cavalcade of Jazz Queen was postponed due to a showdown between Big Joe Turner and Lionel Hampton's band at the 5th concert. The crowd started throwing pillows, programs, and bottles into the field as the band parading back to the stage.

Underground rapper Bones names a song "CentralAve" on album "Rotten" (2014).

== Landmarks and major attractions ==
Near its northern end, Central Avenue passes through Little Tokyo, Los Angeles' oldest Japanese neighborhood and now a historic district listed on the National Register of Historic Places. On Central Avenue just north of First Street is the former Los Angeles Hompa Hongwanji Buddhist Temple. It was declared Los Angeles Historic-Cultural Monument No. 313 in 1986. Across Central Avenue from the Temple is the Japanese American National Museum, and north of that is the original (and largest) branch of the Museum of Contemporary Art, Los Angeles, now known as the Geffen Contemporary at MOCA.

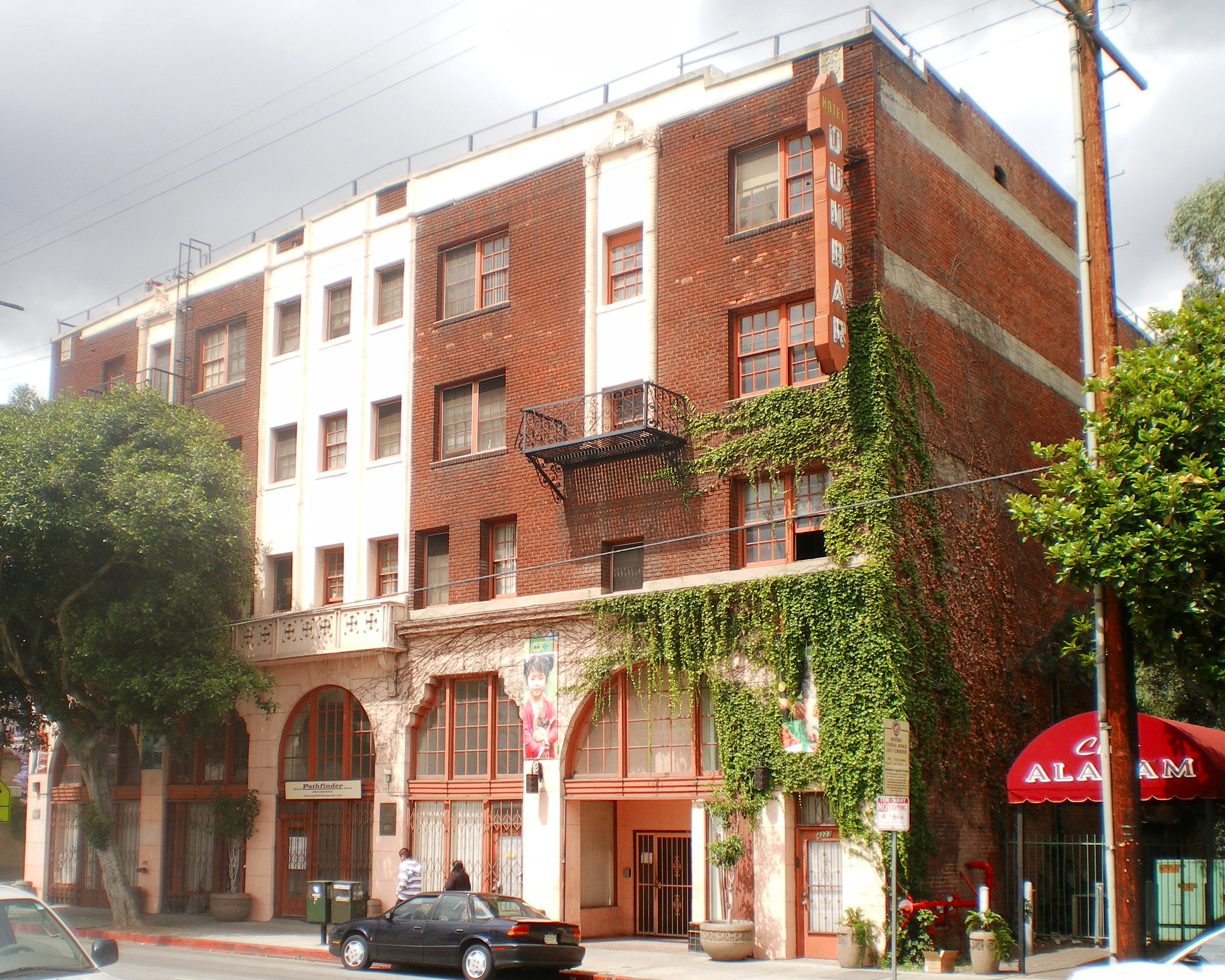
Dunbar Hotel, 2008

In the 1200 block of Central Avenue is the 1930s era Streamline Modern Los Angeles bottling plant of the Coca-Cola company, designed to resemble an ocean liner, complete with porthole windows and metal-railed catwalks. It was declared Los Angeles Historic-cultural Monument #138 in 1975.

At 2300 Central is the now closed Lincoln Theatre, opened in 1926 and was long the leading venue in the city for African-American entertainment. It was declared Los Angeles Historic-Cultural Monument # 744 in 2003.

At 4233 Central Avenue is the Dunbar Hotel, Los Angeles Historic-Cultural Monument #131 since 1974. Built in 1928 by Drs. John and Vada Sommerville, The Dunbar was a place where Black travelers could stay in style and comfort during the era of racial segregation in the United States, when African-Americans were banned from Los Angeles's major hotels. The Dunbar was also the place where Black celebrities were most likely to stay, attracting the likes of Louis Armstrong ("Satchmo"), Ella Fitzgerald, Lena Horne, and Billie Holiday. It was the epicenter of the Los Angeles jazz scene in the 1940s and 1950s. The Dunbar is listed on the National Register of Historic Places.

At 4261 Central Avenue is Los Angeles Historic-Cultural Monument #580, the 1928 Golden State Mutual Life Insurance Building, original headquarters of one of the leading African-American owned insurance business companies the state of California.

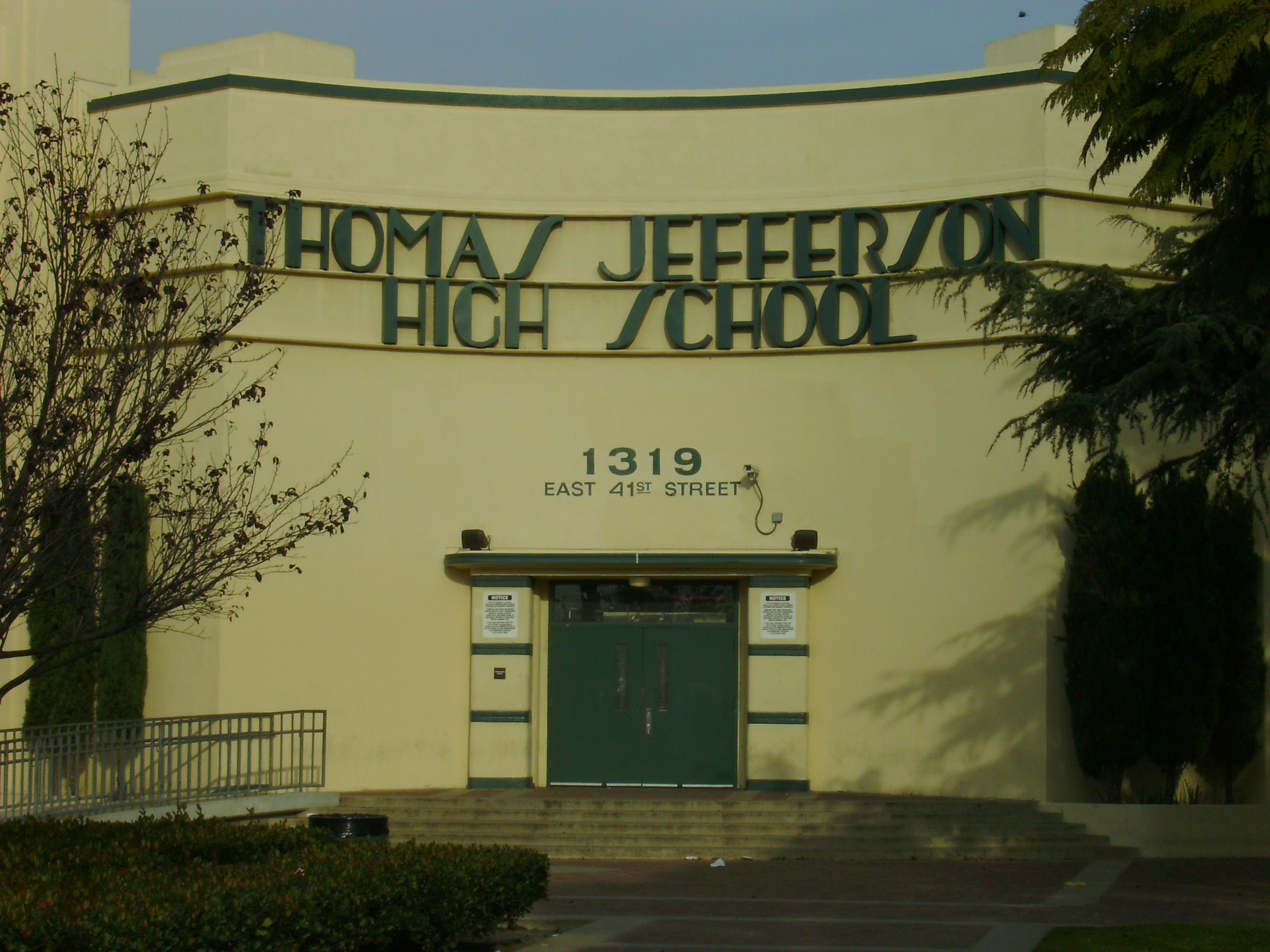
Front entrance to Jefferson High School

Located just off of Central Ave on 1319 E 41st St, Thomas Jefferson High School is central to understanding the Jazz music and the "Jazz scene" for which the area was prominent. Jefferson High School’s importance to Central Ave and its Jazz scene can be attributed to its jazz-nurturing curriculum along with many prominent Jazz figures that it has both produced and has been associated with. Jefferson High served as a pivotal touchstone to the newly established African-American enclave and contributed greatly to the development of West Coast Jazz. It was at Jefferson where Samuel Brown (first African-American music teacher in the Los Angeles public school system) taught music and served as a major influence in teaching and mentoring promising jazz musicians from Los Angeles. Due to Mr. Brown's dedication, Jefferson High School has produced more jazz musicians and composers than any other high school west of the Mississippi.

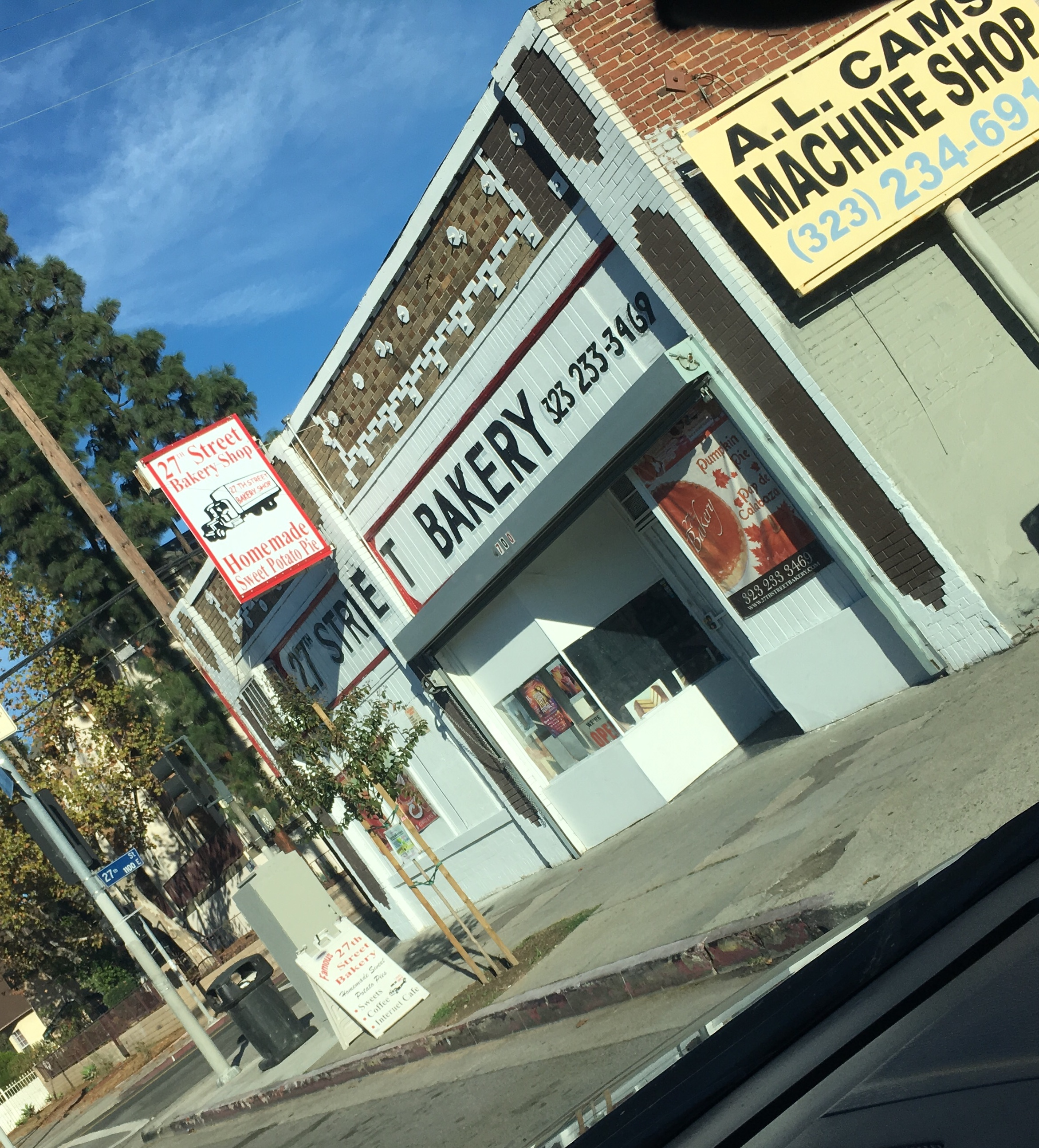
27th Street Bakery in December 2018

Located on the corner of 27th Street and Central Ave at 2700 Central Ave is 27th Street Bakery, now famous for its sweet potato pie. The bakery was initially a restaurant that was established in the 1930s by Harry Patterson and his wife. The couple catered to the African-American migrants from the Southern states who settled on and near Central Avenue. In 1956, the owners decided to turn it into a bakery. The 27th Street Bakery is one of the few remaining African-American owned businesses on Central Ave. The bakery has been in the same family for three generations and is currently owned by Jeanette Pickens, the granddaughter of Harry Patterson, the founder of the bakery. 27th Street Bakery is the largest manufacturer of sweet potato pies on the West Coast of the United States. You can now find their pies in retail stores such Ralphs, Albertsons, 7-Eleven, KFC and Louisiana Famous Fried Chicken. The bakery suffered greatly after the 1992 LA Riots due to the extreme damage done to the neighborhood. Because clientele could not access the bakery for about two weeks, business temporarily decreased.

From the 1950s to the 1990s, the bakery catered towards the needs of the predominant African-American community. Due to the growing population of Latinos/Hispanics in the area in the early 2000s, the bakery expanded their menu to include concha (bread)/pan dulce and empanadas to cater to this new community and also have their menu available in Spanish. The 27th Street Bakery is a core part of Central Ave and its surrounding areas and continues to evolve.

The Central Avenue Jazz Festival is a yearly free music festival held during the last weekend of July along a stretch of Central Avenue which includes the Dunbar Hotel. The festival features jazz, blues, and Latin Jazz performed by both well-known and upcoming artists from the area.

The opening scene of Raymond Chandler's Farewell, My Lovely, published in 1940, takes place on "one of the mixed blocks over on Central Avenue, the blocks that are not yet all Negro."

== Transportation ==
Central Avenue provides bus service along Metro Local: Line 53.

== Books ==
- Central Avenue Sounds: Jazz in Los Angeles (Roth Family Foundation Book in American Music), Clora Bryant et al., ISBN 978-0-520-22098-0
- Central Avenue: Its Rise and Fall, 1890-C1955, Including the Musical Renaissance of Black LA, Bette Yarbrough Cox, ISBN 978-0-9650783-1-3
- The Great Black Way: L.A.’s Central Avenue in the 1940s And the Rise of African-American Pop Culture, R.J. Smith, ISBN 978-1-58648-295-4
- Upside Your Head! Rhythm and Blues on Central Avenue (Music/Culture), Johnny Otis, ISBN 978-0-8195-6287-6
