= Teddy's Ready! =

Studio album by Teddy Edwards Quartet
- Released: 1960
- Recorded: August 17, 1960
- Studio: Contemporary Records Studio, Los Angeles, CA
- Genre: Jazz
- Length: 40:15
- Label: Contemporary; M 3583/S7583
- Producer: Lester Koenig

Teddy Edwards chronology
Sunset Eyes (1960)	Teddy's Ready! (1960)	Back to Avalon (1960)

Teddy's Ready! is an album by saxophonist Teddy Edwards which was recorded in 1960 and released on the Contemporary label.

== Reception ==
Professional ratings
Review scores
Source	Rating
AllMusic	5/5 stars
The Penguin Guide to Jazz Recordings	3.5/4 stars
DownBeat	4/5 stars

AllMusic reviewer Scott Yanow awarded the album 5 stars stating "Edwards has a chance to stretch out and he makes the most of the opportunity, creating some excellent straight-ahead music."

Leonard Feather gave the album a 4 star rating in DownBeat. Feather wrote, "Edwards has a pliant, full-toned manner that recalls some of the best moments of Jacquet, though clearly he has listened to the more recent influences . . . Men like Edwards and Castro are needed as a reminder that hot, happy squalls, as well as cool breezes, blow around the Hollywood hills".

== Track listing ==
All compositions by Teddy Edwards except as indicated

1. "Blues in G" – 6:48
2. "Scrapple from the Apple" (Charlie Parker) – 5:46
3. "What's New?" (Johnny Burke, Bob Haggart) – 3:56
4. "You Name It" – 4:17
5. "Take the "A" Train" (Billy Strayhorn) – 7:20
6. "The Sermon" (Hampton Hawes) – 7:05
7. "Higgins' Hideaway" – 5:03

== Personnel ==
- Teddy Edwards – tenor saxophone
- Joe Castro – piano
- Leroy Vinnegar – bass
- Billy Higgins – drums
