= Vivien Garry =

Jazz bassist

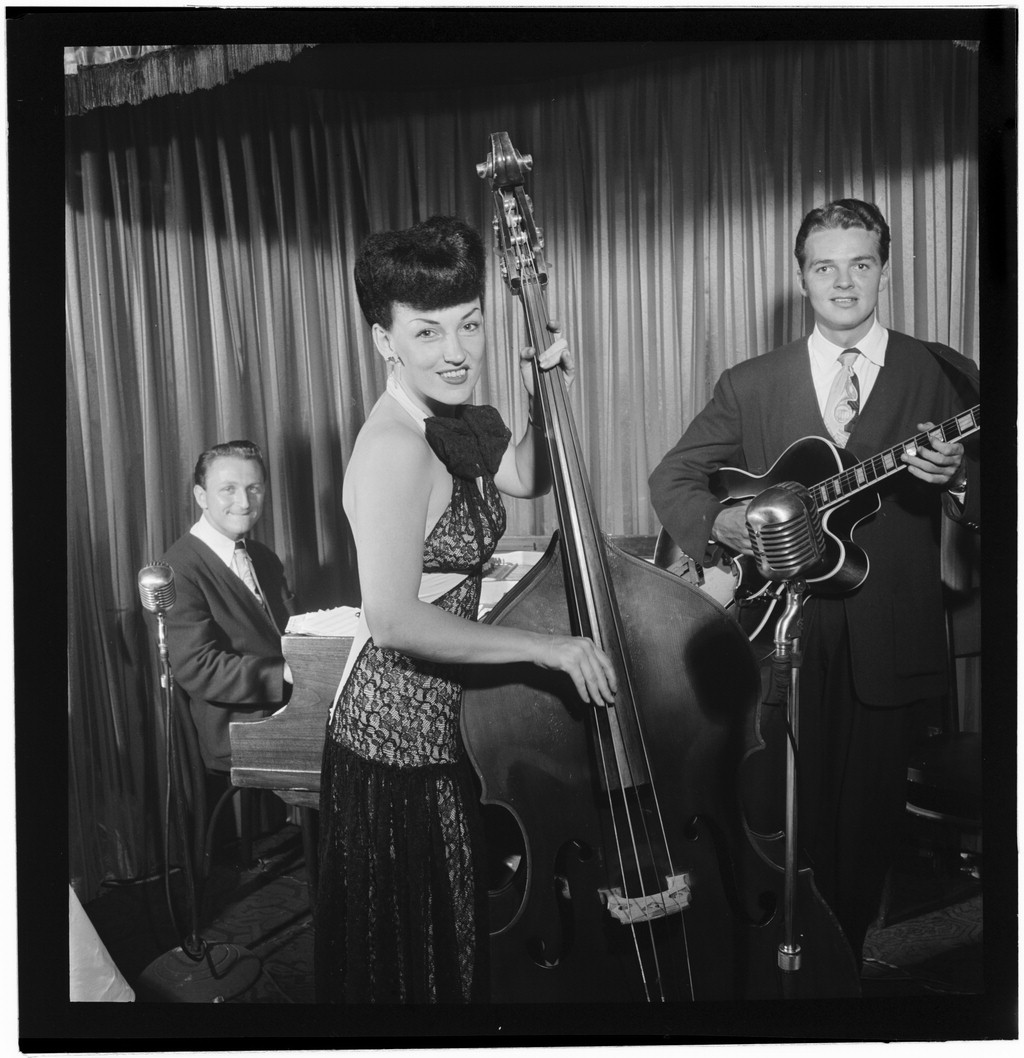
- Teddy Kaye, Vivien Garry, and Arv(in) Charles Garrison c.1947

Background information
- Born: 1920
- Died: December 1, 2008 (aged 87–88)
- Occupation: Jazz musician
- Instrument: Double bass

Vivien Garry (1920 – December 1, 2008) was a jazz bassist. She led the Vivien Garry Quintet (which, on at least one date, included Edna Williams of the International Sweethearts of Rhythm on trumpet and Ginger Smock on violin) and the Vivien Garry Trio (which included her husband, Arv Garrison, on guitar and Wini Beatty on piano).

== Discography ==
Premier Records:

- 29006 Vivien Gary Trio- Flying Home // Mop Mop (rec. 1944)
- 29007 Vivien Gary Trio- Seven Come Eleven // I've Got To, That's All (rec. 1944) - note: these four songs feature Lex Zaharik (p), Arv Garrison (g), Vivien Gary (b, vocal).

Guild Records:

- 124 Vivian Garry Trio- Relax Jack // Altitude (rec. 1945) - note: these two songs feature Teddy Kaye (p, vocal), Arv Garrison (g, vocal), Vivian Garry (b, vocal).

Black & White Records:

- 1216 The Hip Chicks- I Surrender Dear // Moonlight On Turhan Bay (rec. 1945) - note: A side features a guest vocal by Vivian Garry.

Sarco Records (a subsidiary of Gotham Records):

- 101 Vivien Garry Quartet- Hopscotch // Where You At (rec. 1945; rel. 5-46)
- 102 Vivien Garry Quartet- I Surrender Dear // I've Got To, That's All (rec. 1945; rel. 5-46)
- 103 Vivian Garry Quartet- Tonsillectomy // These Foolish Things (rec. 1945; rel. 6-46)
- 104 Vivian Garry Quartet- Rip Van Winkle // Stick Around (rec. 1945; rel. 6-46) - note: these eight songs feature George Handy (p, vocal), Arv Garrison (g, vocal), Vivian Garry (b, vocal), Roy Hall (d).

V-Disc Records:

- 690B Vivian Garry Trio- 1) Where You At; 2) Baby I'm Gone (rel. 10-46) - note: these two songs feature Wini Beatty (p, vocal), Arv Garrison (g, vocal), Vivian Garry (b, vocal); the first side of this record (690A) features three songs by Les Paul & His Trio.

AFRS Jubilee (radio program transcriptions):

- 203 Vivien Garry Trio- 1) Get You, Gertrude; 2) Prisoner Of Love (rel. 11-46) - note: these two songs feature Wini Beatty (p, vocal), Arv Garrison (g), Vivien Garry (b, vocal).
- 205 Vivien Garry- I'm In The Mood For Love (rel. 11-46) - note: this song features Benny Carter (as), Sonny White (p), Thomas Moultree (b), Percy Brice (d), Vivien Garry (vocal).

RCA Victor Records:

- 20-2352 Vivien Garry Quintet- I'm In The Mood For Love // Operation Mop (Edna's Stomp) (rec. 9-46; rel. 8-47)
- 40-0144 Vivien Garry Quintet- A Woman's Place Is In The Groove (Sycamore Blues) // Body And Soul (rec. 9-46; rel. 1-48) - note: these four songs feature Ginger Smock (vln), Edna Williams (tp), Wini Beatty (p), Vivien Garry (b), Dody Jeshke (d).

Signature Records:

- 1004 Leo Watson with Vic Dickenson Quintet- Jingle Bells // Snake Pit (rec. 9-46; rel. 12-46)
- 1007 Leo Watson with Vic Dickenson Quintet- Tight And Gay // Sonny Boy (rec. 9-46; rel. 4-47) - note: these four songs feature Vic Dickenson (tb), Eddie Heywood Jr. or Leonard Feather (p), Arv Garrison (g), Vivien Garry (b), Harold "Doc" West (d), Leo Watson (vocal).

Exclusive Records:

- 11X Buddy Baker & His Orchestra- I'm Stuck With A Sticker // Sleepy Time Down South (rel. 12-46) - note: A side features a guest vocal by Vivien Garry.
- 235 Rickey Jordan with Vivien Garry Trio- A.B.C. Blues // Blues In The Storm (rec. 10-46; rel. 1-47)
- 237 Rickey Jordan with Vivien Garry Trio- Rickey's Blues // Night And Day (rec. 10-46; rel. 1-47) - note: these four songs feature Teddy Kaye (p), Arv Garrison (g), Vivien Garry (b), Ed "Sharkey" Hall (d), Rickey Jordan (vocal); add Teddy Buckner (tp), Les Robinson (as), Lucky Thompson (ts) on "A.B.C. Blues".

Miltone Records:

- 5220 Vivian Garry & The Blenders- Tenderly // ??? (rel. ?-47)
- 5241 Vivian Garry & The Blenders- A Little Bird Told Me // ??? (rel. ?-48)

Superb Records:

- 600 Eddy Edell Four with Vivien Garry: Wha! Hopp'n // I Don't Know Why (rel. ?-49)

Webster Records:

- WE507 Dick Taylor Orchestra- Illusion Of Love // Don't Slam That Door (rel. 4-50) - note: B side features a guest vocal by Vivien Garry.
- WE508 Dick Taylor Orchestra- Sentimental Baby // The Bread And Butter Song (rel. 4-50) - note: B side features a guest vocal by Vivien Garry.
- WE510 Dick Taylor & Vivian Garry- Go On About Your Bizness // The Three Sharps- Boggin' In The Swamp (rel. 7-50)

Skylark Records:

- SK519 Vivien Garry & Dick Taylor- Home Isn't Home Without You // Vivien Garry- Rainbow Romance (rel. 3-51)
- SK521 Vivien Garry- The Popcorn Man // The Knightingales- The Old Carousel (rel. 3-51)
- SK525 Vivien Garry- Campus Room // Trading Kisses With You (rel. 10-51)
- SK526 Vivienne Garry with Dick Taylor & His Taylor Made Music- I Get A Kick Out Of You // Just Supposin' (rel. 10-51)
- SK527 Vivienne Garry with Dick Taylor & His Taylor Made Music- Whispering // Love Me (rel. 10-51)
- SK537 The Lighthouse All Stars- You Know I'm In Love With You // Desire (rel. 5-52) - note: these two songs feature Shorty Rogers (tp), Milt Bernhart (tb), Jimmy Giuffre (ts), Frank Patchen (p), Howard Rumsey (b), Shelly Manne (d), Vivienne Garry (vocal).
