= Ernie Andrews =

American jazz, blues, and pop singer (1927–2022)

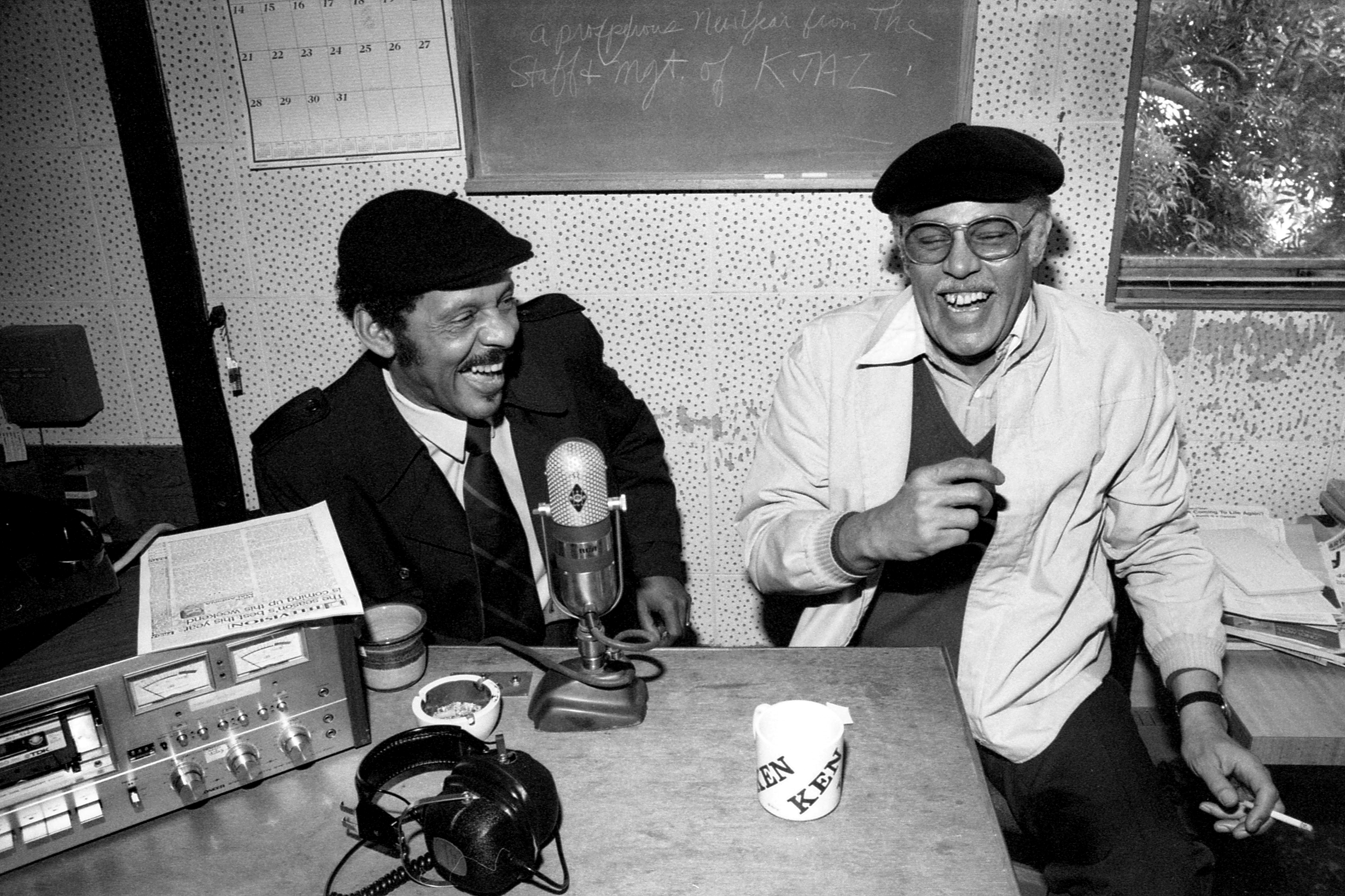
- Andrews, left, and Dexter Gordon at KJAZ, Alameda, California, in 1980

Background information
- Born: Ernest Mitchell Andrews Jr. December 25, 1927; Philadelphia, U.S.
- Died: February 21, 2022 (aged 94) Conroe, Texas, U.S.
- Genres: Blues, jazz, pop
- Occupation: Singer
- Labels: GNP, Capitol, Dot, GNP Crescendo, Discovery, Muse, HighNote

Ernest Mitchell Andrews Jr. (December 25, 1927 – February 21, 2022) was an American jazz, blues, and pop singer.

== Life and career ==
Andrews was born in Philadelphia, Pennsylvania, but grew up in Los Angeles, and is said to have been discovered by songwriter Joe Greene in 1945. Greene wrote his biggest hit, "Soothe Me".

He was a member of the Harry James orchestra, debuting on November 26, 1958, at the Blue Note jazz club in Chicago. He recorded with Columbia Records and others. His career declined in the 1960s and 1970s but would rebound in the 1980s. He recorded with the Capp/Pierce Juggernaut Band, Gene Harris, Jay McShann, and the Harper Brothers. Andrews played a leading part in the documentary film, Blues for Central Avenue.

Andrews died on February 21, 2022, at the age of 94, at a hospital in Conroe, Texas.

== Discography ==
=== As leader ===
- In the Dark (GNP, 1957)
- The Importance of Being Ernest (GNP, 1959)
- Live Session! Cannonball Adderley with Ernie Andrews (Capitol, 1964)
- This Is Ernie Andrews (Dot, 1964; CD reissue: Verve, 2005)
- Soul Proprietor (Dot, 1968)
- Ernie Andrews Sings with the Fuzzy Kane Trio (Phil-L.A. of Soul, 1970)
- Travelin' Light (GNP Crescendo 1975) compilation
- Hear Me Now! (LMI, 1979)
- Sings from the Heart (Discovery, 1981)
- No Regrets (Muse, 1993; CD reissue: 32 Jazz, 1998)
- The Great City (Muse, 1995)
- The Many Faces of Ernie Andrews (HighNote, 1998)
- Girl Talk (HighNote, 2001)
- Jump For Joy (HighNote, 2003)
- How About Me (HighNote, 2006)

=== As sideman ===
With Kenny Burrell

- Ellington Is Forever (Fantasy, 1975)
- Ellington Is Forever Volume Two (Fantasy, 1977)

With Frank Capp & Nat Pierce

- Frank Capp & Nat Pierce: Juggernaut (Concord, 1977)
- The Frank Capp-Nat Pierce Orchestra: Juggernaut Strikes Again! (Concord, 1982)

With Harry James

- "Blue Baiao" b/w "She's Got to Go" [45rpm single] (MGM, 1959) Andrews sings on the B-side
- Live at the Riverboat (Dot, 1966)
- Our Leader! (Dot, 1967)
- Duke Ellington, Harry James, Herb Pomeroy, Jon Hendricks (Europa Jazz, 1981). Live with Harry James & His Orchestra at the Monterey Jazz Festival in 1965
- One Night Stand with Harry James at the Blue Note (Joyce, 1983)

With others

- Clayton-Hamilton Jazz Orchestra, The L.A. Treasures Project: Live at Alvas Showroom with Barbara Morrison (Capri, 2014)
- Bob Cooper and Snooky Young, In a Mellotone (Contemporary, 1986)
- Lionel Hampton, Live at the John Anson Ford Amphitheatre (Phillip, 1998 [2001]) 2-CD
- The Harper Brothers, You Can Hide Inside the Music (Verve, 1992)
- Gene Harris & the Philip Morris Superband, Live at Town Hall, N.Y.C. (Concord, 1989)
- Gene Harris & the Philip Morris All-Stars, Live (Concord, 1998)
- Al Hibbler, I Surrender Dear (Score [Aladdin subsidiary], 1957)
- Plas Johnson, Christmas in Hollywood (Carell, 2000)
- Saskia Laroo, Sunset Eyes 2000 (Laroo, 1999)
- The Legacy Band, The Legacy Lives On (Mack Avenue, 2000)
- Jay McShann & the Paris All-Stars, Paris All-Star Blues: A Tribute to Charlie Parker (MusicMasters/BMG; Musical Heritage Society, 1991)
