= Stop =

Stop may refer to:

== Places ==
- Stop, Kentucky, an unincorporated community in the United States
- Stop (Rogatica), a village in Rogatica, Republika Srpska, Bosnia and Herzegovina

=== Facilities ===
- Bus stop
- Truck stop, a type of rest stop for truck drivers
- Rail stop, colloquialism for a railway station

== Film and television ==
- Stop! (1970 film), an American film by Bill Gunn with Marlene Clark, Anna Aries, Edward Michael Bell
- Stop (1971 film), a French-Canadian film by Jean Beaudin
- Stop! (2004 film), a Hindi romantic film
- Stop (2015 film) South Korean-Japanese co-production directed by Kim Ki-duk
- Stop (Albanian TV program)

== Music ==
- Double stop, the act of playing two notes simultaneously
- Organ stop, a component of a pipe organ
- Stop (Stockhausen), a composition for orchestra by Karlheinz Stockhausen

=== Albums ===
- Stop (Don Lanphere album), and the title song, 1983
- Stop (Eric Burdon Band album), and the title song, 1975
- Stop (Franco De Vita album), 2004
- Stop (Plain White T's album), and the title song, 2001
- Stop! (album), by Sam Brown, and the title song, 1988

=== Songs ===
- "Stop!" (Against Me! song)
- "Stop" (Bang song)
- "Stop!" (Jane's Addiction song)
- "Stop" (Omar Naber song), the Slovene entry to the Eurovision Song Contest 2005
- "Stop" (Pink Floyd song)
- "Stop" (Ryan Adams song)
- "Stop!" (Sam Brown song)
- "Stop" (Sibel Redžep song)
- "Stop" (Spice Girls song)
- "Stop" (Stefanie Heinzmann song), recorded in 2009
- "Stop! In the Name of Love", a song by the Supremes
- "Stop", by AJ Mitchell
- "Stop", by Black Rebel Motorcycle Club from Take Them On, On Your Own
- "Stop", by Clyde McPhatter, B-side of the single "The Best Man Cried"
- "Stop", by Dope from Life
- "Stop", by Fitz and the Tantrums from All the Feels
- "Stop", by En Vogue from Soul Flower
- "Stop!", by Erasure from Crackers International
- "Stop", by Girls Aloud from Sound of the Underground
- "Stop", by J-Hope from Jack in the Box
- "Stop", by James Gang from Yer' Album
- "Stop", by the Linda Lindas from No Obligation
- "Stop", by Matchbox Twenty from Mad Season
- "Stop", by Mega City Four from Sebastopol Rd.
- "Stop", by No Angels from Welcome to the Dance
- "Stop", by Stefanie Heinzmann from Roots to Grow
- "Stop", by Twin Sister from "In Heaven"
- "(Stop)", by the Lottery Winners from Anxiety Replacement Therapy
- "S.T.O.P.", by David Guetta from Listen

== Medicine and anatomy ==
- Stop (dog), a part of a dog's skull
- Stop codon, a type of RNA molecule in genetic code
- STOP protein, a protein in animals
- Surgical termination of pregnancy, a type of abortion

== Linguistics ==
- Stop consonant, a type of consonant in which you block the flow of air for a moment and suddenly release it.
  - Also known as a plosive or an occlusive.

== Optics and photography ==
- Stop, the difference of a power of 2 in the context of exposure value
  - F-stops, a unit of measure of aperture
- Stop bath, a chemical used in film processing

== Arrestation devices ==
- Door stop
- Petzl Stop, a descender used in caving
- Train stop, a train protection device

== Halting ==
- Stop sign, a traffic signal
- Full stop (full point, period), a punctuation mark
  - STOP, used to replace that symbol in telegraphs, as Morse code has no method to produce it (sometimes STOP was used for a comma and FULL STOP for the period).
- Stop error, a computer error screen
- Terry stop, a brief police detention in the United States

== Other uses ==
- Safe Tables Our Priority, a food safety organization
- Secure Trusted Operating Program, a computer operating system
- Stop, a futuristic display typeface by Aldo Novarese
- Stop squark, in quantum physics, a supersymmetric squark which is the superpartner of the top quark
- Society of Teachers Opposed to Physical Punishment, an organisation based in the United Kingdom
- Strategic Operations, a military, police, and medical training company in San Diego
- Stop or stopper, a specific type of card holding in one suit in the game of contract bridge (see: Glossary of contract bridge terms#stopper)

== See also ==
- Stopper (disambiguation)
- Halt (disambiguation)
