= Chair in the Sky =

1980 album by Mingus Dynasty

Studio album by Mingus Dynasty
- Released: May 1980
- Recorded: July 9–10, 1979
- Length: 46:08
- Label: Elektra
- Producer: İlhan Mimaroğlu

Mingus Dynasty chronology
| Chair in the Sky (1980) | Live at Montreux (1980) |

Chair in the Sky is the first studio album by jazz group Mingus Dynasty. It was released in May 1980, through Elektra Records. Produced by İlhan Mimaroğlu, the album features a group of musicians who had previously played with jazz bassist Charles Mingus, and was recorded months after Mingus' death in January 1979.

The album contains renditions of three songs which appeared on Joni Mitchell's Mingus (1979), which was a collaboration with the bassist and featured some of his final compositions. Additionally, versions of "Boogie Stop Shuffle", "Goodbye Pork Pie Hat" (both of which had appeared on Mingus' 1959 album Mingus Ah Um, while a version of the latter with lyrics was included on Mingus), and "My Jelly Roll Soul" (from 1960's Blues & Roots) are included.

== Reception ==
Professional ratings
Review scores
| Source | Rating |
|---|---|
| DownBeat | 4/5 stars |

DownBeat assigned the album 4 stars. Reviewer Jon Balleras wrote,"The notion of the music of the late Charlie Mingus being performed by a repertory company composed of Mingus alumni seems not only a fitting tribute to this virtuoso bassist but also in a way necessary".

== Track listing ==
All tracks are written by Charles Mingus.

Side one
| No. | Title | Length |
|---|---|---|
| 1. | "Boogie Stop Shuffle" | 7:04 |
| 2. | "A Chair in the Sky" | 9:13 |
| 3. | "My Jelly Roll Soul" | 6:10 |
| Total length: | | 22:27 |

Side two
| No. | Title | Length |
|---|---|---|
| 1. | "Sweet Sucker Dance" | 6:46 |
| 2. | "The Dry Cleaner from Des Moines" | 9:25 |
| 3. | "Goodbye Pork Pie Hat" | 7:30 |
| Total length: | | 23:41 |

== Personnel ==
- John Handy – alto saxophone
- Joe Farrell – tenor saxophone
- Jimmy Owens – trumpet, flugelhorn
- Jimmy Knepper – trombone
- Don Pullen – piano
- Charlie Haden – bass
- Dannie Richmond – drums
