= Primrose Path (Jimmy Knepper and Bobby Wellins album) =

Studio album by Jimmy Knepper and Bobby Wellins
- Released: 1980
- Recorded: November 19, 1980
- Studio: Wave Studios, London, UK
- Genre: Jazz
- Label: Hep; Hep 2012
- Producer: Alastair Robertson

Jimmy Knepper chronology
| Tell Me... (1979) | Primrose Path (1980) | 1st Place (1982) |

Bobby Wellins chronology
| Dreams are Free (1979) | Primrose Path (1980) | Birds of Brazil (1982) |

Primrose Path is an album led by trombonist Jimmy Knepper with saxophonist Bobby Wellins which was recorded in 1980 and originally released on the Scottish Hep label. The album was rereleased on CD in 1994 along with Just Friends as Special Relationship.

== Track listing ==
All compositions by Jimmy Knepper except where noted.

1. "Primrose Path" – 12:37
2. "What is There to Say" (Vernon Duke, Yip Harburg) – 4:53
3. "Song for Keith" (Pete Jacobsen) – 3:02
4. "Gnome on the Range – 8:44
5. "'Round Midnight" (Thelonious Monk) – 6:08
6. "Latter Day Saint" – 7:16

== Personnel ==
- Jimmy Knepper – trombone
- Bobby Wellins – tenor saxophone
- Pete Jacobsen – piano
- Dave Green – bass
- Ron Parry – drums
