= Into Somewhere =

Studio album by Don Lanphere
- Released: 1983
- Recorded: 1983
- Genre: Bebop; Post bop
- Label: Hep Records
- Producer: Alastair Robertson

Professional ratings
Review scores
Source	Rating
Allmusic	4.5/5 stars

Into Somewhere is a studio album by Don Lanphere released by Hep Records in 1983.

== Track listing ==
1. Noble Indian Song, Pt. 2
2. Dear Old Stockholm
3. Take the 'A' Train
4. Last Night When We Were Young
5. Brown Rock
6. I Heard You Cry Last Night
7. Here, Not There Silly
8. For Kai
9. In the Garden

== Personnel ==
- Don Lanphere — soprano saxophone, tenor saxophone
- Jeff Fuller — double-bass
- Don Friedman — piano
- Ignacio Berroa — drums
- Jonathan Pugh — trumpet
- Dave Peterson — guitar
