= Donn Trenner =

American musician (1927–2020)

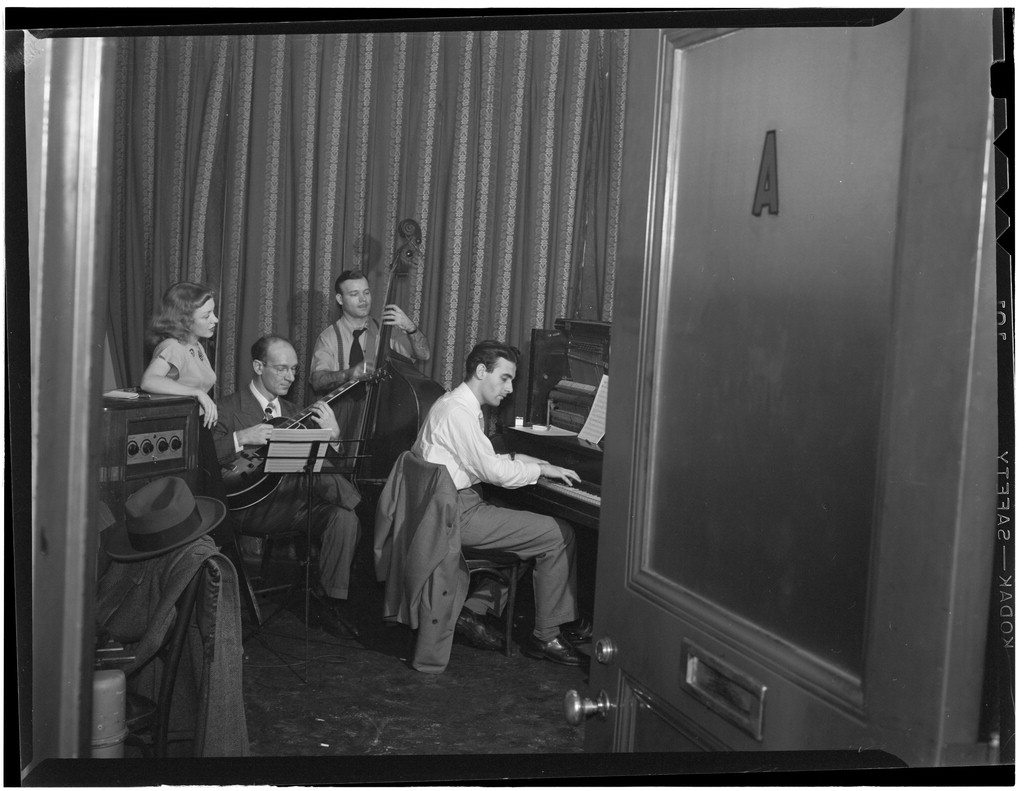
- Donn Trenner (right) with Helen Carr, Sammy Herman, Joe Bianco, Nola's, New York, N.Y. ca. February 1947. Photograph by William P. Gottlieb

Background information
- Born: March 10, 1927; New Haven, Connecticut, U.S.
- Died: May 16, 2020 (aged 93)
- Genre: Jazz
- Occupations: Pianist, conductor, arranger
- Instrument: Piano

Donald Trenner (March 10, 1927 – May 16, 2020) was an American jazz pianist and arranger born in New Haven, Connecticut.

== Career ==
He began his career playing with Ted Fio Rito from 1943 to 1945, and followed this with a slot in Buddy Morrow's orchestra in 1947. He worked with Charlie Barnet in 1951 and following this with Jerry Gray, Charlie Parker, Stan Getz, Georgie Auld, Jerry Fielding, Skinnay Ennis, Les Brown, Dick Haymes, Jack Jones, Lena Horne, Ann-Margret, Shirley MacLaine and Nancy Wilson. In 1957 he played with Oscar Pettiford and toured Europe in 1958 with Anita O'Day. He also toured with Bob Hope entertaining the U.S. troops. Additionally, he recorded with Tommy Dorsey, Vic Schoen, Howard McGhee, Frances Faye, Betty Roche, Nelson Riddle, Paul Broadnax, Charles Mingus, and Ben Webster.

In the 1960s, Trenner worked as a studio musician, and led The Steve Allen Show house band. He continued working in television throughout the 1970s and 80s.

== Personal life ==
On April 22, 1947 in Elkton, Maryland, Trenner married singer Helen Carr, who sang with The Donn Trio. They were married until her death in 1960. In 1966 Trenner married actress and singer B. J. Ward. Although they divorced in 1978, they remained one of each other's closest and dearest friends until his death. In 1990, Trenner married Marycarmen Jones and though they divorced in 2005, they continued marking days as a family. They had a daughter, Sara Elizabeth Trenner.

== Discography ==
With Dave Pell

- Jazz & Romantic Places (Atlantic, 1955)

With Betty Roché

- Take the "A" Train (Bethlehem, 1956)

With Ben Webster

- The Warm Moods (Reprise, 1961)
