= The Jazz Experiments of Charlie Mingus =

Studio album by Charles Mingus
- Released: 1955
- Recorded: December 1954
- Genre: Jazz
- Length: 46:27
- Labels: Bethlehem, London (UK)

Charles Mingus chronology
Miss Bliss (1953)	The Jazz Experiments of Charlie Mingus (1955)	Jazz Composers Workshop (1956)

Jazzical Moods Vol. 1 Cover

The Jazz Experiments of Charlie Mingus is an album by jazz bassist and composer Charles Mingus released on the Bethlehem label. The album contains tracks originally released by Period Records as two 10-inch LPs entitled Jazzical Moods and co-credited to John LaPorta.

== Reception ==
The AllMusic review by Heather Phares stated: "These 1954 Period Records sessions include the work of Thad Jones on trumpet and John LaPorta on clarinet and alto sax, combine old and new forms of classical and jazz for a cool jazz sound. Tracks like 'Minor Intrusion' and 'Thrice Upon a Time' demonstrate the synergy between Mingus and his players, and display his compositional skills".

Professional ratings
Review scores
Source	Rating
AllMusic	3/5 stars
The Rolling Stone Album Guide	4/5 stars

== Track listing ==
All compositions by Charles Mingus except as indicated

1. "What Is This Thing Called Love?" (Cole Porter) - 8:14
2. "Minor Intrusion" - 10:23
3. "Stormy Weather" (Harold Arlen, Ted Koehler) - 3:21
4. "Four Hands" (John LaPorta, Mingus) - 8:59
5. "Thrice Upon a Theme" - 6:47
6. "The Spur of the Moment / Echonitus" (LaPorta, Mingus) - 8:43

- Recorded in New York in December 1954

== Original Jazzical Moods Track Listings ==
All compositions by Charles Mingus except as indicated

=== Jazzical Moods, Vol. 1 ===
1. "What Is This Thing Called Love?" (Cole Porter) - 8:14
2. "Stormy Weather" (Harold Arlen, Ted Koehler) - 3:21
3. "Minor Intrusion" - 10:23
4. "Abstractions" - 4:14 (Not included in The Jazz Experiments of Charlie Mingus)

=== Jazzical Moods, Vol. 2 ===
1. "The Spur of the Moment / Echonitus" (LaPorta, Mingus) - 8:43
2. "Thrice Upon a Theme" - 6:47
3. "Four Hands" (LaPorta, Mingus) - 8:59

== Personnel ==
- Charles Mingus - bass, piano
- John LaPorta - clarinet, alto saxophone
- Thad Jones (credited on original issue as "Oliver King") - trumpet (tracks 1–3 & 6)
- Teo Macero - tenor saxophone, baritone saxophone
- Jackson Wiley - cello (tracks 1–3)
- Clem DeRosa - drums, tambourine
