= Clem DeRosa =

American jazz musician

Clem DeRosa (né Clement Richard De Rosa; May 20, 1925 – December 20, 2011, in Texas) was an American jazz drummer, composer, arranger, band leader, and influential music educator.

== Career highlights ==
Before World War II, DeRosa performed in the New York City area. He was drafted in the U.S. Army and performed with Glenn Miller Air Corps band. After being discharged, he worked as a professional drummer in 1950s, performing with Charles Mingus (Jazzical Moods, 1954), Marian McPartland, Teo Macero, Teddy Wilson, Thad Jones, Ben Webster, Clark Terry, Phil Woods, Coleman Hawkins, Dennis Sandole, Wally Cirillo (1927–1977), John LaPorta (Conceptions, 1957), Kenyon Hopkins, and Bobby Hackett.

He studied composition at Juilliard. DeRosa earned a Master of Music degree in orchestral conducting from the Manhattan School of Music.

He went on to teach music. In the 1960s, DeRosa was influential in formalizing jazz music education. DeRosa was co-founder and chairman of the National Association of Jazz Educators, the forerunner of the International Association for Jazz Education (IAJE). Through the NAJE, DeRosa taught with the Stan Kenton Clinics where he collaborated with Kenton and other jazz education pioneers, including Gene Hall, and Leon Breeden. He taught at the Teachers College, Columbia University. His student ensembles performed on the television shows of Johnny Carson and Merv Griffin. DeRosa received an honorary doctorate from the Five Towns College in 1990 and was inducted into the IAJE Hall of Fame.

During the 1960s, DeRosa's high school jazz band performed in Hecksher Park, Huntington, N.Y. with leading jazz musicians, including Angelo DiPippo, Zoot Sims, Ruth Brown, Marian McPartland, Eddie Daniels, Bobby Rosengarden, Billy Taylor, Jimmy Nottingham, Clark Terry, Jimmy Rushing, and many others. The band also performed at Leonard Bernstein's home in Fairfield Connecticut along with Dizzy Gillespie; at Yankee Stadium for the University of Oklahoma in a nationally televised football game against West Point; and at half time at Buffalo in a nationally televised AFL game between the Buffalo Bills and the N.Y. Titans.

After retirement in 1980, he worked mainly as a leader. He led the Glenn Miller Orchestra, whose recording in the Digital Mood for GRP Records received a Gold Disc. He also led the ghost bands of Jimmy Dorsey. In the 1990s, DeRosa led the New York City Big Band.

He coauthored books with Mel Lewis, Dick Hyman, Michael Moore, and Ed Shaughnessy. Shortly before his death, DeRosa moved from New Jersey, where he had lived with his wife, to be near his son Richard DeRosa (born 1955), a professor of music composition at the University of North Texas College of Music.

== Selected discography ==
- Pioneer of Jazz Education (1996) OCLC 55964452
- The Sandole Brothers & Guests, ZYX Music, (1955 & 2001) OCLC 725642387

== Selected publications ==
- Dick Hyman, Clem DeRosa: It's Time for Some Changes Piano, Kendor Music, Delevan, 1980 OCLC 7807113
- Clem DeRosa, Mel Lewis: It's Time. For the big band drummer Kendor Music, Delevan, 1978 OCLC 41748697
- Clem DeRosa, Ed Shaughnessy: Show Drumming:.. The Essential Guide to Playing Drumset for Live Shows and Musicals Hal Leonard Corp., 2004
- Clem DeRosa, Michael Moore. The Michael Moore Bass method Rottenburg (Tübingen): Advance Music Products, 2002
