= Rocks in My Bed =

1941 song by Duke Ellington

"Rocks in My Bed" is a 1941 song written by Duke Ellington.

Harvey G. Cohen in his 2010 book Duke Ellington's America writes that "Rocks in My Bed" "presents a more honest and adult impression of sexual loneliness than most Swing Era lyrics". The lyrics arose from a conversation between two women that Ellington overheard.

The academic Walter van de Leur theorized in his analysis of several Ellington pieces of the early 1940s that "Rocks in My Bed" may have been partially written by Billy Strayhorn yet solely copyrighted to Ellington without additional attribution. Van de Leur analysed Strayhorn's reharmonisation of the piece for Ivie Anderson's 1941 vocal recording and felt that it marks the moment that Strayhorn "changed from arranger to co-composer".

It was introduced by Big Joe Turner in the 1941 musical revue Jump for Joy. Turner said in an interview that he assisted Ellington with the arrangement and composition of "Rocks in My Bed" whilst in preparation for Jump for Joy at the Dunbar Hotel.

"Rocks in My Bed" was included in the 1997 musical comedy Play On! at the Brooks Atkinson Theatre directed by Sheldon Epps.

The song has become associated with female singers. Betty Roché's version has been praised for its "gloriously bluesy scatting" and Sarah Vaughan's for her "earthy styling".

== Notable recordings ==
- Ella Fitzgerald - Ella Fitzgerald Sings the Duke Ellington Songbook (1958)
- Sarah Vaughan - The Duke Ellington Songbook, Vol. 2 (1979)
- Georgia Carr - Rocks In My Bed (1964)
- Betty Roché - Lightly and Politely (recorded in 1960, released in 1961)
