= Marilyn Moore =

Marilyn Moore may refer to:

- Marilyn Moore (singer) (1930–1992), American jazz singer
- Marilyn Moore, 1977 victim of serial killer Peter Sutcliffe
- Marilyn Moore (politician) (born 1948), Connecticut state senator
