= Bobby Wellins =

Scottish tenor saxophonist (1936–2016)

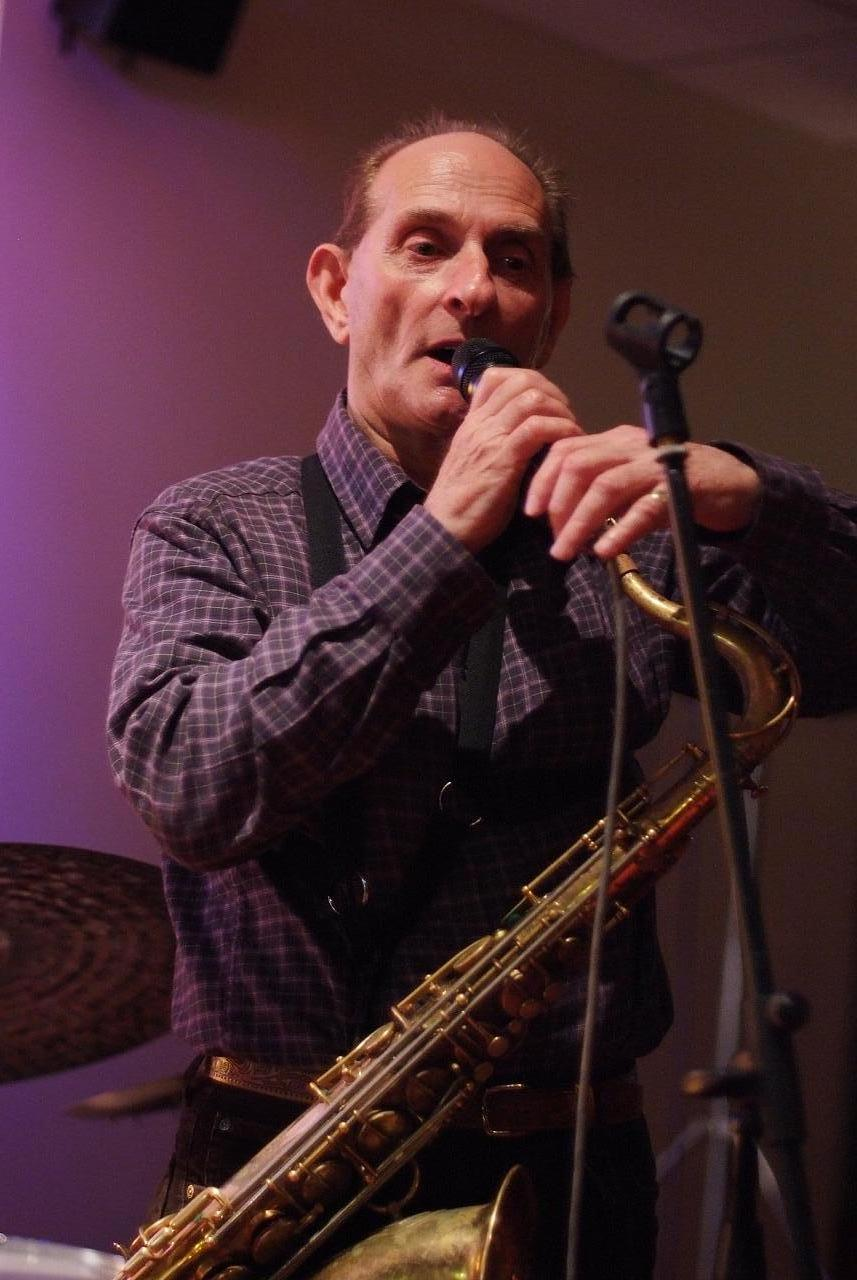
- Wellins performing live in 2008

Background information
- Born: Robert Coull Wellins; 24 January 1936; Glasgow, Scotland
- Died: 27 October 2016 (aged 80)
- Genre: Jazz
- Occupations: Musician, bandleader
- Instrument: Tenor saxophone
- Years active: 1950s–2016

Robert Coull Wellins (24 January 1936 – 27 October 2016) was a Scottish tenor saxophonist who collaborated with Stan Tracey on the album Jazz Suite Inspired by Dylan Thomas's "Under Milk Wood" (1965).

== Biography ==
Robert Coull Wellins was born into a showbiz family living in The Gorbals, Glasgow; he later lived in Carnwadric and attended Shawlands Academy. Wellins studied alto saxophone and harmony with his father Max, and also played piano and clarinet when young. He joined the RAF as a musician playing tenor sax. After demobilisation, he played with a few Scottish bands before moving to London in the mid-1950s. He was a member of Buddy Featherstonhaugh's quintet between 1956 and 1957, together with Kenny Wheeler. He performed in the US with Vic Lewis in 1958. Around that time, Wellins also joined drummer Tony Crombie's Jazz Inc., where he first met pianist Stan Tracey, joining Tracey's quartet in the early 1960s. Wellins also worked with Lionel Grigson in 1976. At the end of the 1970s he was a member of the Jim Richardson Quartet.

In the mid-1970s, Wellins led his own quartet with pianist Pete Jacobsen, bassist Adrian Kendon (replaced later by Ken Baldock, and then Andy Cleyndert in the 1980s) and drummer Spike Wells. In the 1980s, Wellins formed a quintet with fellow sax player Don Weller and then with guitarist Jim Mullen; the former group included Errol Clarke on piano, Cleyndert on bass and Wells on drums, while the latter featured Pete Jacobsen on piano. Following this group, Wellins led various quartets, which included players such as Liam Noble on piano, Simon Thorpe on bass and Dave Wickens on drums. Later, Wellins renewed his association with drummer Spike Wells with a quartet featuring Mark Edwards on piano and Andrew Cleyndert on bass.

Wellins also taught in the jazz department at West Sussex Institute of Higher Education.

In 2011, the artistic director of the Scottish National Jazz Orchestra, Tommy Smith, commissioned Florian Ross to arrange Wellins' five-movement Culloden Moor Suite: The Gathering, The March, The Battle, Aftermath and the Epilogue, which toured Scotland and Shetland. In May 2013, the suite was recorded in Gorbals Sound Studio and mixed in Rainbow Studios in Oslo. The Herald's Rob Adams stated: "Wellins had been inspired to write in 1961 after reading John Prebble's account of the last battle to be fought on British soil and its chilling aftermath. Now this recording puts it in its rightful place as a great jazz musician's response to an event that affected him in a way that makes the local universal." Writing in The Guardian, Dave Gelly noted of the Culloden Moor Suite: "His dry, haunting tone and spare, eloquent phrases dominate the performance and make this an outstanding album." All About Jazz states: "Culloden Moor Suite needs to stand alone as a musical work if it's going to have broad appeal. It does so, both in terms of Wellins' composition and the quality of the performances by the saxophonist and his colleagues in the SNJO." The other suite of arrangements commissioned for the 2011 SNJO tour was entitled the Caledonian Suite, inspired by James Barke's books about Robert Burns. All compositions were written by Wellins: "Song in the Green Thorn Tree" arranged by Florian Ross; "The Wind That Shakes The Barley" arranged by Geoffrey Keezer; "The Tartan Rainbow" arranged by Christian Jacob; "Dreams of Free" arranged by Tommy Smith.

In 2012, Wellins was the subject of a documentary film entitled Dreams are Free, directed by Brighton-based director Gary Barber. Using interview and concert footage, the film traces the rise, fall and redemption of Wellins, showing how he overcame addiction and depression, and rediscovered the desire to play after ten years away from jazz.

Wellins died on 27 October 2016, having been ill for some years.

== Discography ==
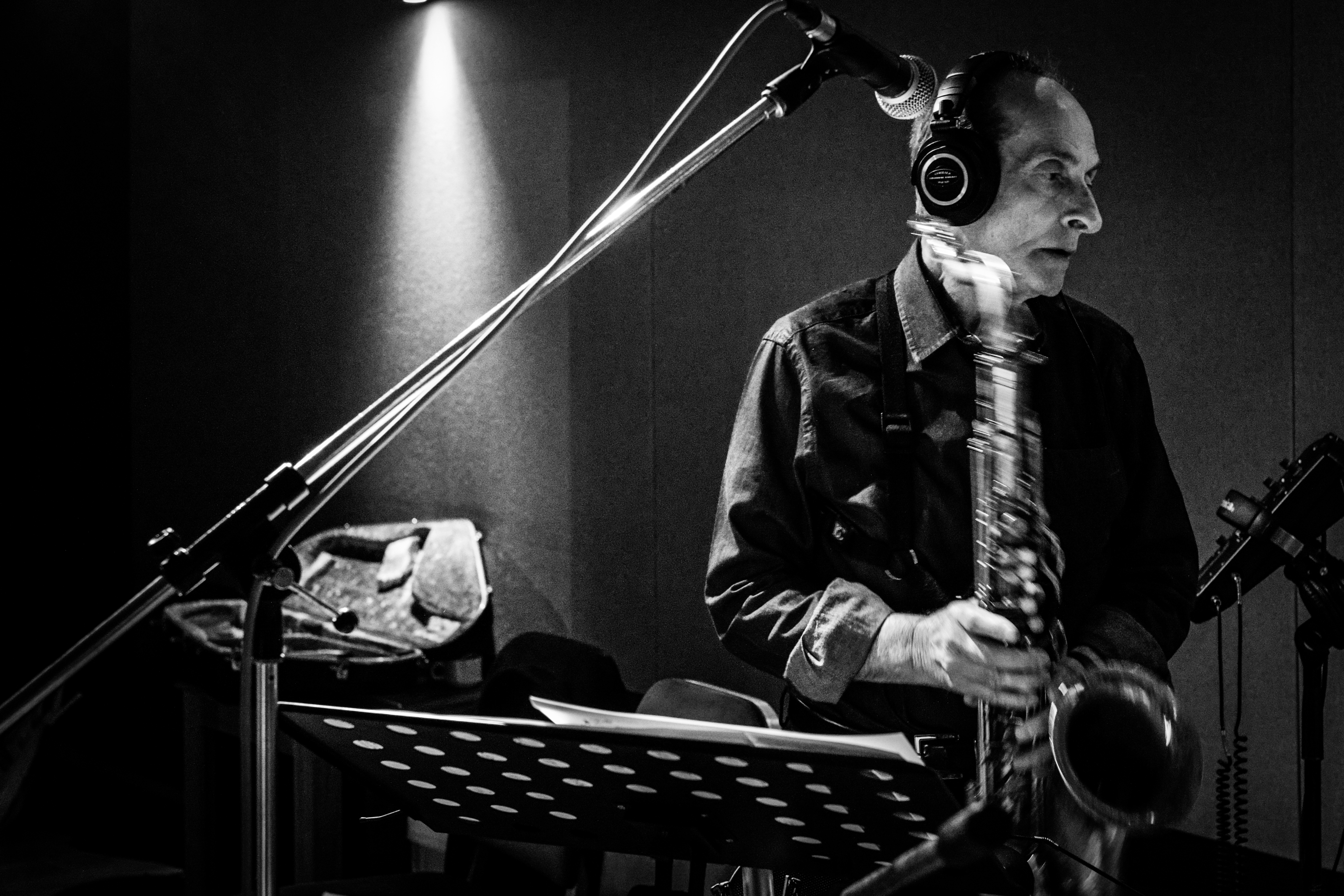
Wellins in the studio recording his Culloden Moor Suite with the Scottish National Jazz Orchestra in 2013

=== As leader ===
- Live ... Jubilation (Vortex, 1978)
- Dreams Are Free (Vortex, 1979)
- Making Light Work (Hep, 1983)
- Birds of Brazil (Sungai, 1989)
- Nomad featuring Claire Martin (Hot House, 1992)
- Special Relationship with Jimmy Knepper, Joe Temperley (Hep, 1994)
- Don't Worry 'Bout Me (Cadillac, 1997)
- The Satin Album (Jazzizit, 1997)
- Comme D'Habitude with Stan Tracey (Jazzizit, 1998)
- The Best Is Yet to Come (Jazzizit, 1998)
- Fun (Jazzizit, 2003)
- When the Sun Comes Out (Trio, 2005)
- Nine Songs with Don Weller (Trio, 2007)
- Snapshot (Trio, 2008)
- Joyspring with Gary Kavanagh (Trio, 2008)
- Time Gentlemen, Please (Trio, 2010)
- Smoke and Mirrors with Kate Williams (CD Baby/Kwjazz, 2012)
- Culloden Moor Suite with Scottish National Jazz Orchestra (Spartacus, 2014)

=== As sideman ===
With The Stan Tracey Quartet

- Jazz Suite Inspired by Dylan Thomas's "Under Milk Wood" (Columbia, 1965)

With Jimmy Knepper

- Primrose Path (Hep, 1980)

=== Compilation ===
- What Was Happening, Bobby Wellins Quartet, Jazz in Britain (2023)
