= HLT =

HLT may refer to:

== Computing ==
- HLT (x86 instruction)
- Human language technology

== Places ==
- Hamilton Airport (Victoria), Australia
- Harrah's Lake Tahoe, a casino hotel in Stateline, Nevada, United States
- Harveys Lake Tahoe, another casino hotel in Stateline
- Howick Little Theatre, a community theatre based in Pakuranga, Auckland, New Zealand

== Other uses ==
- Hilton Worldwide, a hospitality business
- Nga La language, spoken in Burma (ISO 639-3: hlt)
- Hurricane Liaison Team of the United States National Hurricane Center

== See also ==
- Halt (disambiguation)
