= Just Friends (Joe Temperley and Jimmy Knepper album) =

Studio album by Joe Temperley and Jimmy Knepper
- Released: 1979
- Recorded: October 20, 1978
- Studio: Mastertone Studio, NYC
- Genre: Jazz
- Label: Hep; Hep 2003
- Producer: Alastair Robertson

Joe Temperley chronology
Just Friends (1979)	Nightingale (1991)

Jimmy Knepper chronology
Jimmy Knepper in L.A. (1977)	Just Friends (1978)	Tell Me... (1979)

Just Friends is an album led by saxophonist Joe Temperley and trombonist Jimmy Knepper which was recorded in 1978 and originally released on the Scottish Hep label. The album was rereleased on CD in 1994 along with Primrose Path as Special Relationship.

== Track listing ==
1. "John's Bunch" (John Bunch) – 4:55
2. "Stella By Starlight" (Victor Young, Ned Washington) – 4:45
3. "Just in Time" (Jule Styne, Betty Comden, Adolph Green) – 4:25
4. "Poor Butterfly" (Raymond Hubbell, John Golden) – 3;50
5. "Just Friends" (John Klenner, Sam M. Lewis) – 6:15
6. "Yardbird Suite" (Charlie Parker) – 6:10
7. "Aristocracy (of Jean Lafitte)" (Duke Ellington) – 5:22
8. "Sophisticated Lady" (Ellington) – 4:25
9. "Lester Leaps In" (Lester Young) – 5:08

== Personnel ==
- Joe Temperley – soprano saxophone, tenor saxophone, baritone saxophone
- Jimmy Knepper – trombone
- Derek Smith – piano
- Michael Moore – bass
- Billy Hart – drums
