= Everest Records =

Defunct American record label

- Founded: 1958
- Founder: Harry D. Belock; Bert Whyte
- Status: Defunct
- Distributors: Universal Music Group (physical); BMG Rights Management (digital)
- Genre: classical Music
- Country of origin: United States

Everest Records was a record label based in Bayside, New York, started by Harry D. Belock and Bert Whyte in May 1958. It was devoted mainly to classical music.

== History ==
The idea for starting a label was related by electronics inventor Harry Belock (who also worked on sound films in Hollywood in the 1930s) to Roland Gelatt in the February 1959 issue of High Fidelity: "The more of them I heard, the more I felt that nobody had a good stereo library. So I decided to get into the business myself." The plan was to record repertory that was new to stereo. Belock was very ambitious, and told High Fidelity that "We're out to surpass Capitol. We're not shooting marbles." Belock Instrument Corporation, a manufacturer of precision equipment (particularly missile electronics) was the parent of the Everest label 1958-1960 (operated as the Belock Recording Company). Everest would issue its recordings on monaural LP (LPBR 6000 series), stereo LP (SDBR 3000 series), and tape.

Everest also developed a popular and jazz division that issued albums in the LPBR 5000 series (mono) and SDBR 1000 series that, for several years, had composer/conductor Raymond Scott, known for the television series Your Hit Parade, as head and chief A&R man. It was natural for Scott and two of his Hit Parade regulars, Dorothy Collins (who was Scott's wife at the time) and Gisele MacKenzie, to record for the label. MacKenzie was featured on a popular live recording done during her night club engagement at The Empire Room of The Waldorf-Astoria, while Collins was featured on an ambitious collection of holiday tunes with the Joe Lily Singers and Nathan VanCleve's orchestra (both alumnae from the Bing Crosby film classic White Christmas) titled "Won't You Spend Christmas with Me?" Scott released several instrumental albums for the label, and teamed with Dorothy Collins for a joint effort, "Singin' and Swingin'", which was never released, although initial promotional efforts were made via television appearances by Collins. Other pop and jazz artists on the label included Nelson Eddy, Randy Van Horne Singers, Gloria Lynne, Woody Herman, Charlie Barnet, Ann Blyth, and Russ Morgan, among others. The label also entered the singles market with some non-LP 45 rpm releases by their contracted pop and jazz performers.

Gloria Lynne relates in her autobiography, I Wish You Love. how she met Raymond Scott and Harry Belock at the Brill Building in New York's Tin Pan Alley in 1957 where they were on the lookout for a vocalist. According to Lynne: "Harry was the money man and Raymond was the creative guy. They were talking in such technical terms that I didn't understand all of the mechanics of what they were proposing, but they were going to pay me five hundred dollars, and I understood that."

Bert Whyte was the producer and engineer. Ruth, his wife, was the assistant engineer. Belock and Whyte decided to record music on 35 mm magnetic film, which they believed was an improvement over half-inch tape. Westrex built this equipment to their specifications, at a cost then of about $20,000 for each recorder. Neumann U 47 microphones were purchased to go with the film recorders. Everest’s recording philosophy was to make minimally miked three-channel recordings using 35 mm film recorders in the specially designed Belock Recording Studio in Bayside, New York and in a portable version on location in the USA and Europe. In May 1959, Edward Wallerstein (formerly president of Columbia Records) was appointed as a vice-president of the company.

Whyte was determined to engage well-known performers in a market loaded with exclusive contract artists. Everest managed to engage the services of several major conductors, including Sir Adrian Boult, Josef Krips, Eugene Aynsley Goossens, Malcolm Sargent, William Steinberg, Walter Susskind and Leopold Stokowski.

Stokowski signed a contract to record with Everest on September 26, 1958. Among the first Everest recordings were a group with Stokowski conducting the "Stadium Symphony Orchestra of New York" (a pseudonym for members of the New York Philharmonic) in Manhattan Center. (The New York Philharmonic formerly gave summer concerts in Lewisohn Stadium.) Stokowski recorded eleven albums for Everest during 1958-59. Six were made with the spurious Stadium Symphony and five with the Houston Symphony Orchestra. Stokowski believed that the recording philosophy of Everest was contrary to music making, and more in line with mathematics and engineering. None of the records he made with the company seemed to satisfy him. However, most are still considered technically exceptional. Stokowski discovered pirated recordings of his Everest records being issued on the Tiara label. These included both his name and the name of the Houston Symphony Orchestra. He wrote Bernard Solomon at Everest to ask how this could be possible.

In England, Everest recorded the London Philharmonic Orchestra and London Symphony Orchestra at Walthamstow Town Hall. The world premiere recording of Ralph Vaughan Williams's Symphony No. 9 in E minor was made by Everest at Walthamstow on the morning of the composer's death, August 26, 1958. The composer planned to attend the Everest sessions just as he had attended the earlier Decca sessions for the first eight symphonies. As before, Adrian Boult conducted the London Philharmonic Orchestra, but this time he began by recording a tribute to the composer.

Everest also recorded several composers conducting their own works, including Malcolm Arnold, Carlos Chavez, Aaron Copland, Morton Gould, Ferde Grofé, and Heitor Villa-Lobos. In addition, one LP featured historic Melodiya recordings of Sergei Prokofiev and Aram Khachaturian conducting their violin concertos, each with David Oistrakh as soloist. In 1967, Everest issued the first performance of Shostakovitch's suppressed Thirteenth Symphony, using a live recording smuggled out of the Soviet Union. In the Everest Archive of Piano Music, the company made stereo recordings on a 1929 Steinway piano of Percy Grainger playing his own music on the Aeolian Company's Duo-Art piano reproduction mechanism.

Sadly, one composer/performer, Ernő Dohnányi (Ernst von Dohnanyi), died in 1960 while recording piano compositions for Everest. Dohnányi made few recordings, not caring much for the process. He was attempting to complete a huge recording assignment in January, 1960 when he fell ill at a session. His condition deteriorated quickly and in a matter of hours he was stricken with a heart attack. Correctly believing that this was his final opportunity to record, Dohnányi continued with the session, and he died two days later. Everest issued a memorial album to the composer, on SDBR 3061.

Everest negotiated with Cetra Records in Italy to issue that label's extensive catalog of complete opera recordings in the United States. Several of these recordings were of obscure or rarely performed operas, many of them issued on records for the first, or only time.

Everest prospered for only a few years. The label may have been hurt financially by Whyte's recording the complete Pablo Casals Festival in 1960. By this time, Harry Belock owned only 22% of the business and the board removed him from control. Belock (who died in 1999) left the record business and sold his interest in Everest to his accountant, Bernard Solomon, in 1962. The studio and all its recording equipment was sold in 1961 to engineer C. Robert Fine, who used the equipment for Mercury Records, Command Classics and other recordings. A Mercury CD release by Robert Fennell of Gershwin and Cole Porter (434 327-2/1993) contains the following information on the inside of the booklet: "The songs of Cole Porter were recorded in the Bayside Studio of Fine Recording, N.Y., on November 20 and 21, 1961, on 3-track 35mm film, 3-track half inch tape, and 2 track quarter-inch tape..on this CD the 3-track half inch master was used as the 35mm was unavailable." This would indicate, if true, that Mercury Records had commenced 35mm recording using at least some of the Belock equipment in late 1961.

The studio operated for a few more years as Fine Recording Bayside but was closed in the mid-1960s. The 35 mm equipment was absorbed into Fine Recording's main facility in Manhattan. One of the original machines was used by Wilma Cozart Fine to remaster Mercury 35 mm recordings for CD in the 1990s. When Everest was being sold off, the popular recordings were purchased by Liberty Records, who issued some of them on their budget Sunset label, titles by Gisele MacKenzie, Randy Van Horne Singers, Nelson Eddy and Raymond Scott. Much of the pop and jazz masters remained in the Liberty vault, until the label was purchased by EMI. The classical catalogue comprising all the original 35mm film masters and half inch magnetic tapes are currently archived under controlled conditions in the Hamburg vaults of Countdown Media/BMG Music who purchased the copyright from Grammercy in the 1990s. Prior to that the copyright was owned, it is believed, by Omega/Vanguard Records who undertook the first modern digital remastering released by Vanguard Classics. King Records in Japan are currently in the process of releasing all titles on SACD discs. A previous all tube reissue and remastering by Classic Records in the 1990s of a small number of 35mm film masters to both high quality vinyl repressings and DVD-Audio did unfortunately suffer from some wow and flutter issues. The plan now is for one further digital remastering using modified Westrex record/playback machines with added laser guidance to eliminate these problems in the age of the masters. The 35mm film masters and magnetic tapes are reported to be in a very good condition due to only light use to date. {correspondence with Countdown Media/David Murphy }

The rights to the Jazz and Popular catalogue are now also held in Japan, though reissues using excellent remastering from the original tapes continue to be released by Universal Music and Essential Media.

A number of Everest recordings were also issued by the World Record Club, both on LP and on tape. These were mono at 3 3/4 ips. but very high quality.

Many audiophiles feel that the only Everest LPs worth collecting are those that were recorded and pressed while Belock was at the company. Identifying these records is relatively easy: the first issues sport a silver/turquoise label (with the earliest of these having a wood dowel on the outside edge of the inner sleeve). The silver paper used on these covers usually becomes brittle and deteriorates with age. The second label is a purple mountain. The entire classical catalog of Belock Everests is relatively small, fewer than 100 LPs.

== Reissues ==
The Everest masters were located in a California vault in 1993 by Seymour Solomon, president of Omega Records and founder of Vanguard Classics. In recent years, some of Everest's audiophile recordings of the Belock/Whyte era have been reissued on compact disc by Collectables Records, DCC Compact Classics, Omega, and Vanguard Classics and on CD, DVD-Audio and LP by Classic Records. everest

== Selected acquisitions ==
In 1965, Everest acquired Period Records.

In 1966, Everest bought American folk label Tradition Records, reissuing releases under the “Tradition Everest” imprint.

== See also ==
- List of record labels
