= Wally Cirillo =

American jazz musician (1927–1977)

Wallace Joseph "Wally" Cirillo (February 4, 1927, Huntington, New York - May 5, 1977, Boca Raton, Florida) was an American jazz pianist and composer.

Cirillo studied at the New York Conservatory of Modern Music (1948–50) and the Manhattan School of Music, and played with Chubby Jackson and Bill Harris in the early 1950s. In 1954 he began working with John LaPorta, Teo Macero and Charles Mingus as part of the New York Jazz Composers Workshop. The following year, he led a session with Mingus, Macero, and Kenny Clarke, which was later reissued under Mingus's name as Jazz Composers Workshop. The melody of the piece "Transeason" on this album, composed by Cirillo, makes use of serialism, one of the earliest manifestations of this compositional technique in jazz, though harmonically "Transeason" is based on "All the Things You Are." He also recorded with LaPorta and with Johnny Mathis in the 1950s.

Cirillo relocated to Florida in 1961, where he led his band and worked with Phil Napoleon, Flip Phillips, Ira Sullivan, and Joe Diorio. He recorded sparsely throughout his career.
