= Mingus Dynasty (band) =

American jazz ensemble

Mingus Dynasty was an American jazz ensemble formed in 1979, just after the death of Charles Mingus, which featured many musicians Mingus recorded or played with. The group was named after the 1959 album Mingus Dynasty.

In 1988, the group expanded to a big band format, and the Mingus Big Band has held weekly residency in New York City since 1991. Currently there are three Mingus repertory groups, Mingus Dynasty, Mingus Big Band and the Mingus Orchestra. They all tour extensively worldwide and rotate Monday nights at DROM in New York.

Among the group's alumni are Jimmy Owens, Randy Brecker, Richard Williams, Jon Faddis, Jimmy Knepper, John Handy, Craig Handy, Joe Farrell, Ricky Ford, George Adams, David Murray, Clifford Jordan, Nick Brignola, Don Pullen, Roland Hanna, Jaki Byard, Mike Richmond, Dannie Richmond, Billy Hart, Kenny Washington, Charlie Haden, Aladar Pege, Reggie Johnson, Reggie Workman, and Richard Davis.

== Discography ==
- Chair in the Sky (Elektra, 1980) U.S. Jazz No. 23
- Live at Montreux (Atlantic, 1980)
- Reincarnation (Soul Note, 1982)
- Live at the Theatre Boulogne-Billancourt/Paris, Vol. 1 (Soul Note, 1988)
- Live at the Theatre Boulogne-Billancourt/Paris, Vol. 2 (Soul Note, 1988)
- Big Band Charles Mingus (Soul Note, 1988)
- Mingus' Sounds of Love (Soul Note, 1988)
- Next Generation Performs Charles Mingus Brand New Compositions (Columbia, 1991)
- At the Bottom Line (West Wind, 1995)
