= New York Conservatory of Modern Music =

Former music school in Brooklyn, New York

The New York Conservatory of Modern Music was a music school in New York City, founded soon after World War II (Note: Adverts for the conservatory may be found in the music press from 1947, 1948, 1949, and 1950.) by principal Alfred Francis Sculco, (Note: Sculco's full middle name can be verified through a combination of his newspaper obituary, army draft card, and social security details.) a professional trumpeter from Westerly, Rhode Island who attended the Juilliard School, and played with the big bands of Count Basie, Tommy Dorsey, Benny Goodman, and Harry James.

Located at 552 Atlantic Avenue in Brooklyn, it is notable for the alumni who went on to become working jazz musicians, (Note: In the immediate postwar period, the school was possibly the only institution in the United States teaching big band jazz.) including Jimmy Cheatham, Wally Cirillo, Seldon Powell, and George Tucker. Jazz record producer Don Schlitten is also a former student.

In addition to Sculco (affectionately known as "Squeak" by the students) and others, Tony Aless, Billy Bauer, Jim Chapin, and Don Lamond were all instructors at the college.

== See also ==
- List of defunct colleges and universities in New York
