= Cunningbird =

Studio album by Jimmy Knepper Quintet
- Released: 1977
- Recorded: November 8, 1976
- Studio: C.I. Recording, NYC
- Genre: Jazz
- Length: 58:25 CD with bonus tracks
- Label: SteepleChase SCS 1061
- Producer: Nils Winther

Jimmy Knepper chronology
The Pepper-Knepper Quintet (1958)	Cunningbird (1977)	Jimmy Knepper in L.A. (1977)

Cunningbird is an album led by trombonist Jimmy Knepper, recorded in 1976 and released on the Danish SteepleChase label.

== Reception ==
Professional ratings
Review scores
Source	Rating
AllMusic	4.5/5 stars
The Penguin Guide to Jazz Recordings	3/4 stars

The Globe and Mail wrote that "Knepper is one of the most individual stylists of mainstream jazz trombone, with a tone so soft-centred that it sometimes seems to slow down his articulation to a mumble."

In his review for AllMusic, Scott Yanow said: "Trombonist Jimmy Knepper, who had not had the opportunity to lead his own record session in 19 years, is in top form during this quintet outing with tenor saxophonist Al Cohn... Knepper contributed all six compositions, which include a couple of haunting ballads, a blues, and a few songs based on the chord changes of standards. However, it is for the excellent solo work of Knepper and Cohn that this hard bop release is most highly recommended."

== Track listing ==
All compositions by Jimmy Knepper.

1. "Figment Fragment" – 7:41
2. "Languid" – 5:34
3. "Just Tonight" – 8:25
4. "Noche Triste" [take 1] – 8:07 Bonus track on CD reissue
5. "Spotlight Girl" [take 2] – 6:43 Bonus track on CD reissue
6. "Cunningbird" – 6:33
7. "Noche Triste" – 7:33
8. "Spotlight Girl" – 7:44

== Personnel ==
- Jimmy Knepper – trombone
- Al Cohn – tenor saxophone
- Roland Hanna – piano
- George Mraz – bass
- Dannie Richmond – drums
