= Marilyn Moore (singer) =

American jazz singer (1930–1992)

- Born: Marilyn Montez Moore; June 16, 1930; Chicago, Illinois, US
- Died: March 19, 1992 (aged 61) Fort Lauderdale, Florida, US
- Genre: Jazz
- Occupation: Singer
- Instrument: Vocals
- Label: Bethlehem
- Spouse: Al Cohn (m. 1953, div. 1958) (2 children)

Marilyn Montez Moore (June 16, 1930 – March 19, 1992) was an American jazz singer active during the 1950s. She recorded one solo album, Moody Marilyn Moore in 1957 for Bethlehem Records. Her vocal style was said to be akin to Billie Holiday's, and according to jazz critic Will Friedwald, Holiday and Moore were friends.

== Early life ==
Marilyn Moore was born June 16, 1930 (although some sources state 1931) in Chicago, Illinois to Montez and Lester Moore, who were both established vaudeville performers. The Moore family, deeply rooted in the traveling entertainment world of vaudeville, provided an immediate immersion in performance arts for their daughter; Montez and Lester worked as a team, appearing in theatrical shows across the Midwest and beyond.

Shortly after her birth, the family relocated to Oklahoma City, where Moore's parents continued their act, bringing young Marilyn into the fold as a participant from the tender age of three, during which she sang and danced in the finale of their vaudeville act. This early involvement in her parents' vaudeville performances fostered her initial familiarity with stage life and the demands of live entertainment and highlighted her natural aptitude for entertainment, rooted in her family's professional background. As a teenager during the early 1940s, Marilyn Moore shifted her focus from family vaudeville performances to singing, embracing jazz as her primary genre while working in local clubs in Oklahoma City and Chicago. Although she developed her singing skills at home from the age of three, she honed her vocal skills in high school, becoming a recognized vocalist among local audiences in Oklahoma City. Moore received her formal education in Oklahoma City,attending Jefferson Elementary School and Edgemere Elementary school, followed by Harding Junior High School. She graduated from Classen High School in Oklahoma City in 1946, completing her secondary education during a period when her interest in singing was already evident. These formative years laid the groundwork for her later focus on vocal performance.

== Career ==
By the mid-1940s, Moore's professional opportunities expanded through band affiliations that marked her entry into the jazz scene. During her high school years, she performed with saxophonist Herbie Fields, gaining exposure in jazz circles. She later collaborated with luminaries Dizzy Gillespie and Charlie Parker during engagements in Chicago, further solidifying her transition to jazz club work. Following graduation, she joined Woody Herman's band in 1949 and performed with Charlie Ventura, and also toured with Benny Goodman's orchestra. She also was the featured vocalist with the Charley Barnett orchestra at the Apollo Theatre in New York. These experiences, blending chorus elements with emerging solo vocal efforts, positioned her amid the vibrant postwar jazz landscape before her move to New York. Upon settling in New York City in the early 1950s, Moore sang with ensembles led by Ray McKinley, Boyd Raeburn, and saxophonist Al Cohn, whom she married in 1953. Marilyn Moore made her recording debut with the album Moody Marilyn Moore, released in 1957 by Bethlehem Records. Recorded in New York City between January and February 1957, the sessions captured Moore's intimate vocal style amid a small ensemble that evoked a smoky, late-night jazz atmosphere. The album, her only solo release, drew immediate attention for Moore's phrasing, which echoed that of Billie Holiday, with Moore maintaining her own rhythmic vitality and baby-doll charm, distinguishing her through swinging, horn-mimicking flourishes rather than precise intonation. Upon its release in 1957, it achieved modest success, attracting niche interest within jazz circles but not charting broadly. Nonetheless, it received strong praise from prominent jazz critics for her emotive delivery and stylistic depth. Critics highlighted Moore's vocal affinity for Billie Holiday, yet commended her unique authority and sensitivity that elevated the material beyond mere imitation, primarily marked by phrasing that evidenced her deep connection to Holiday's influence, while portraying the scarcity of her output as a significant oversight in jazz history. Leonard Feather of Downbeat Magazine praised Moore as "the finest new jazz singer I've heard this year" and the LP as "a joy from start to finish." The production featured arrangements by Al Cohn, Don Abney, and George Russell, blending standards with lesser-known tunes to highlight Moore's emotive delivery on themes of solitude and heartbreak. Moore's key collaborations during this period centered on her work with husband Al Cohn, whose arrangements and saxophone playing infused the sessions with a personal synergy reflective of their marriage since 1953. The album also spotlighted partnerships with esteemed jazz figures like arranger George Russell and bassist Milt Hinton, whose contributions added depth to Moore's debut. These sessions marked the height of her recording activity in the 1950s, showcasing her alongside a cadre of New York studio veterans. Following the release of her 1957 album Moody Marilyn Moore, Marilyn Moore ceased professional recording activities, with her final documented session occurring in 1958 for the MGM Records cast album of the jazz revue Oh, Captain!, a jazz-infused adaptation of the Broadway show, where she performed alongside Coleman Hawkins, Art Farmer, Oscar Pettiford, and Harry "Sweets" Edison.

== Personal life ==
She was the first wife of saxophonist Al Cohn (who accompanied Moore on her album Moody Marilyn Moore) and the mother of guitarist Joe Cohn and Lisa Cohn. Joe Cohn's career drew from the musical environment shaped by his parents and carried Moore's enduring legacy after her death in 1992. This familial connection underscored Moore's indirect impact on subsequent generations of jazz musicians. The marriage occurred at a time when her career in the New York jazz scene was beginning to flourish through performances with leading ensembles. Shortly after they married in 1953, Moore paused her professional activities for a while to prioritize family responsibilities, resuming briefly in 1957 to record her debut album, Moody Marilyn Moore, where Cohn provided arrangements and performed on saxophone alongside musicians like Joe Wilder and Barry Galbraith.

The couple divorced in 1958. In the immediate aftermath, Moore withdrew from recording and performing, later explaining through Cohn that while she cherished music, she could not tolerate the demands of the industry; this self-imposed retirement marked the end of her active jazz career. Moore was left to raise her family as a single parent, focusing on domestic life rather than the entertainment industry. She never recorded again. She later re-attended college, earning a degree and becoming a clinical psychotherapist, stepping away from the entertainment field; instead, dedicating her life to helping others. Modern jazz music critics noted that Moore's self-imposed withdrawal from music represented "a great loss to the music world", and that her limited discography was a profound missed opportunity for jazz vocal traditions. Up until her death, she maintained close ties with her children.

She died in March 1992, at the age of 61, in Fort Lauderdale, Florida.

Moore's career received acknowledgment in jazz reference works and contemporary obituaries published shortly after her passing. An obituary in The Oklahoman detailed her early show business roots and musical achievements, which has helped preserve her place in jazz history as an under-recorded talent whose brief output left a mark on the genre. As well, her music has been re-issued several times and has gained renewed interest among modern contemporary audiences with her albums being included in various compilation albums with other jazz musicians such as Betty Roche.

== Discography ==
- Moody (1957, Bethlehem Records)
- Oh, Captain! (1959, MGM Records)
- Playboy (1960, Crosstown Records)
