= Stop (Don Lanphere album) =

Studio album by Don Lanphere
- Released: 1983
- Recorded: 1983
- Genre: Bebop
- Label: Hep Records
- Producer: Alastair Robertson

Professional ratings
Review scores
Source	Rating
Allmusic	4.5/5 stars
The Penguin Guide to Jazz Recordings	3/4 stars

Stop is a studio album by Don Lanphere released by Hep Records in 1983.

== Track listing ==
1. "New U.S. Moon"
2. "Stop"
3. "Body and Soul"
4. "A.L.C."
5. "I Heard You Cry Last Night"
6. "Avalon"
7. "There's No You"
8. "The Preacher"
9. "Laura"
10. "Still Will"

== Personnel ==
- Don Lanphere — soprano saxophone, tenor saxophone
- Chuck Deardorf — bass guitars
- Dean Hodges — drums
- Marc Seales — piano
- Jonathan Pugh — trumpet
