= Winner's Circle =

1958 album by winners of DownBeat poll

Studio album by Frank Rehak, Al Cohn, Donald Byrd, Oscar Pettiford, John Coltrane, Freddie Green, Gene Quill, Rolf Kühn, Kenny Burrell, Art Farmer, Eddie Costa, Philly Joe Jones, Ed Thigpen and Harry Tubbs
- Released: January 1958
- Recorded: September and October 1957, New York City
- Genre: Jazz
- Label: Bethlehem

Winner's Circle is a 1958 album by jazz musicians who came first or second in Down Beat's critics' poll of 1957.

== Track listing ==
1. "Lazy Afternoon"
2. "Not So Sleepy"
3. "Seabreeze"
4. "Love and the Weather"
5. "She Didn't Say Yes"
6. "If I'm Lucky (I'll Be the One)"
7. "At Home with the Blues"
8. "Turtle Walk"

== Personnel ==
Recorded September and October 1957 in New York City

Personnel on tracks 1, 3, 5 & 7, recorded September 1957:

- Art Farmer – trumpet
- Rolf Kühn – clarinet
- Eddie Costa – vibraphone [out on track 7]
- Kenny Burrell – guitar
- Oscar Pettiford – double bass
- Ed Thigpen – drums
- Harry Tubbs – arranger

Personnel on tracks 2, 4, 6 & 8, recorded October 1957:

- Donald Byrd – trumpet
- Frank Rehak – trombone
- Gene Quill – alto saxophone [track 2 only]
- John Coltrane – tenor saxophone
- Al Cohn – baritone saxophone
- Eddie Costa – piano
- Freddie Green – rhythm guitar [track 2 only]
- Oscar Pettiford – double bass
- Ed Thigpen – drums [out on track 2]
- Philly Joe Jones – drums [track 2 only]
- Harry Tubbs – arranger
