= Dream Dancing (Jimmy Knepper album) =

Studio album by Jimmy Knepper Quintet
- Released: 1986
- Recorded: April 3, 1986
- Studio: Van Gelder Studio, Englewood Cliffs, NJ
- Genre: Jazz
- Length: 59:38
- Label: Criss Cross Jazz; 1024
- Producer: Gerry Teekens

Jimmy Knepper chronology
I Dream Too Much (1984)	Dream Dancing (1986)	T-Bop (1991)

Dream Dancing is an album led by trombonist Jimmy Knepper which was recorded in 1986 and released on the Criss Cross Jazz label.

== Reception ==
Professional ratings
Review scores
Source	Rating
Allmusic	4/5 stars
The Penguin Guide to Jazz Recordings	3/4 stars

The Allmusic review by Scott Yanow states "The music is essentially straight-ahead hard bop, but Knepper's continually surprising solos uplift the music".

== Track listing ==
All compositions by Jimmy Knepper except where noted.

1. "Dream Dancing" (Cole Porter) – 7:04
2. "Goodbye" (Gordon Jenkins) – 6:25
3. "All Through the Night" (Porter) – 5:22
4. "In the Interim" – 6:43
5. "Of Things Past" – 6:34
6. "This Time the Dream's on Me" (Harold Arlen, Johnny Mercer) – 7:16
7. "In the Interim" [take 3] – 5:58 Bonus track on CD
8. "Dream Dancing" [take 1] (Porter) – 7:14 Bonus track on CD
9. "Night Vision" – 6:57 Bonus track on CD

== Personnel ==
- Jimmy Knepper – trombone
- Ralph Moore – tenor saxophone
- Dick Katz – piano
- George Mraz – bass
- Mel Lewis – drums
