= I Dream Too Much (album) =

Studio album by Jimmy Knepper Sextet
- Released: 1984
- Recorded: February 9, 1982
- Studio: Vanguard Studios, NYC
- Genre: Jazz
- Length: 44:02
- Label: Soul Note; SN 1092
- Producer: Giovanni Bonandrini

Jimmy Knepper chronology
1st Place (1982)	I Dream Too Much (1984)	Dream Dancing (1986)

I Dream Too Much is an album led by American trombonist Jimmy Knepper which was recorded in 1984 and released on the Italian Soul Note label.

== Reception ==
Professional ratings
Review scores
Source	Rating
Allmusic	4/5 stars
The Penguin Guide to Jazz Recordings	3.5/4 stars

The Allmusic review by Michael G. Nastos simply states "All brass front line. Includes three Knepper compositions, two standards, one by Hanna".

== Track listing ==
All compositions by Jimmy Knepper except where noted.

1. "I Dream Too Much" (Jerome Kern) – 10:05
2. "Sixpence" – 6:52
3. "If I Say I'm Sorry" (Roland Hanna) – 3:47
4. "Under the Sun" – 7:36
5. "Beholden" – 8:29
6. "Bojangles of Harlem" (Kern) – 7:13

== Personnel ==
- Jimmy Knepper – trombone
- John Eckert – trumpet
- John Clark – French horn
- Roland Hanna – piano
- George Mraz – bass
- Billy Hart – drums
