= Jimmy Knepper in L.A. =

Studio album by Jimmy Knepper Quintet
- Released: 1978
- Recorded: September 8 & 9, 1977
- Studio: Sage & Sound Recording Studio, Hollywood, CA
- Genre: Jazz
- Length: 40:45
- Label: Discomate; DSP-5008
- Producer: Lew Tabackin

Jimmy Knepper chronology
Cunningbird (1976)	Jimmy Knepper in L.A. (1978)	Just Friends (1978)

Jimmy Knepper in L.A. is an album led by trombonist Jimmy Knepper, recorded in 1977 and originally released in Japan on the Discomate label and in the United States on the Inner City label.

== Reception ==
Professional ratings
Review scores
Source	Rating
Allmusic	4/5 stars

The Allmusic review by Scott Yanow states: "These veterans have little difficulty coming up with fresh statements on the six familiar chord changes that they interpret. The hard-charging Tabackin matches very well with Knepper's sly trombone; they should have a rematch someday".

== Track listing ==
1. "The Masher" (Jimmy Knepper) – 5:02
2. "My Old Flame" (Sam Coslow, Arthur Johnston) – 4:57
3. "Yesterdays" (Jerome Kern, Otto Harbach) – 8:23
4. "Bertha the Dragoness" (Knepper) – 5:30
5. "All the Things You Are" (Kern, Oscar Hammerstein II) – 10:30
6. "Things Ain't What They Used to Be" (Mercer Ellington) – 6:23

== Personnel ==
- Jimmy Knepper – trombone
- Lew Tabackin – tenor saxophone, [flute
- Roger Kellaway – piano
- Monty Budwig – bass
- Shelly Manne – drums
