= The Cool Sound of Pepper Adams =

Studio album by Pepper Adams
- Released: 1958
- Recorded: November 19, 1957
- Studio: Van Gelder Studio, Hackensack, NJ
- Genre: Jazz
- Length: 33:11
- Label: Regent; MG 6066
- Producer: Ozzie Cadena

Pepper Adams chronology
Critics' Choice (1957)	The Cool Sound of Pepper Adams (1958)	The Pepper-Knepper Quintet (1958)

Pure Pepper cover

The Cool Sound of Pepper Adams is an album led by baritone saxophonist Pepper Adams which was recorded in late 1957 and originally released on the Regent label. The album was rereleased on Savoy as Pure Pepper in 1984 with an additional previously unreleased track.

== Reception ==
Professional ratings
Review scores
Source	Rating
The Penguin Guide to Jazz	3/4 stars
Allmusic	4/5 stars
The Rolling Stone Jazz Record Guide	4/5 stars

The Penguin Guide to Jazz states "The Cool Sound of Pepper Adams is hardly an appropriate title for a session by this leader, although the plodding tempos of three of the four pieces here don't generate much heat".

The Allmusic review by Jason Ankeny states "A wonderfully soulful session featuring striking contributions from pianist Hank Jones and drummer Elvin Jones, its four lengthy cuts pulsate with energy and invention. Despite complementing Adams' baritone leads with Bernard McKinney's euphonium, the music never sounds bloated. Instead, it's supple and slinky, with a dexterity that's utterly winning".

== Track listing ==
1. "Bloos, Blooze, Blues" (P. David) – 10:12
2. "Seein' Red" [Alternate take] (Bernard McKinney) – 7:41 Bonus track on reissue
3. "Like...What Is This?" (McKinney) – 7:35
4. "Skippy" (Abe Woodley) – 7:47
5. "Seein' Red" (McKinney) – 7:22

== Personnel ==
- Pepper Adams – baritone saxophone
- Bernard McKinney – euphonium
- Hank Jones – piano
- George Duvivier – bass
- Elvin Jones – drums
