= A Swinging Introduction to Jimmy Knepper =

Studio album by Jimmy Knepper
- Released: 1957
- Recorded: September 1957
- Studio: NYC
- Genre: Jazz
- Length: 41:59
- Label: Bethlehem; BCP 77
- Producer: Lee Kraft

Jimmy Knepper chronology
New Faces (1957)	A Swinging Introduction to Jimmy Knepper (1957)	The Pepper-Knepper Quintet (1958)

A Swinging Introduction to Jimmy Knepper is an album led by trombonist Jimmy Knepper which was recorded in 1957 and originally released on the Bethlehem label. The album was rereleased in 1977 as Idol of the Flies.

== Reception ==
Professional ratings
Review scores
Source	Rating
Allmusic	4/5 stars

The Allmusic review by Scott Yanow states "The music is essentially cool-toned bop with six standards and three Knepper originals all being given swinging treatment".

== Track listing ==
All compositions by Jimmy Knepper except where noted.

1. "Love Letters" (Victor Young, Edward Heyman) – 5:05
2. "Ogling Ogre" – 3:42
3. "You Stepped Out of a Dream" (Nacio Herb Brown, Gus Kahn) – 4:41
4. "How High the Moon" (Morgan Lewis, Nancy Hamilton) – 3:58
5. "Gee, Baby, Ain't I Good to You" (Andy Razaf, Don Redman) – 4:38
6. "Idol of the Flies" – 5:46
7. "Close as Pages in a Book" (Sigmund Romberg, Dorothy Fields) – 4:22
8. "Avid Admirer" – 4:59
9. "Irresistible You" (Don Raye, Gene de Paul) – 4:05

== Personnel ==
- Jimmy Knepper – trombone
- Gene Roland – trumpet, vocals (tracks 5, 7 & 9)
- Gene Quill – alto saxophone (tracks 1–4, 6 & 8)
- Bill Evans (tracks 1–4, 6 & 8), Bob Hammer (tracks 5, 7 & 9) – piano
- Teddy Kotick – bass
- Dannie Richmond – drums
