= Harry D. Belock =

American inventor (1908–1999)

Harry David Belock
- Born: April 10, 1908; New York City, New York, United States
- Died: November 8, 1999 (aged 91); Long Beach, New York, United States
- Occupations: Inventor; engineer

Harry David Belock (April 10, 1908 – November 8, 1999) was an American electronics inventor, engineer and entrepreneur.

== Biography ==
He was born April 10, 1908, in New York City.

Belock was a self-taught scientist. He was described as one of the world's greatest electronic scientists without a string of college degrees after his name.

An early occupation was construction of one of Brooklyn's first radio stations, WARS, atop the Shelburne Hotel. Belock spent 1933–1935 as a sound engineer in Hollywood and years as a freelance inventor. He designed transmitters and sound-effects equipment for CBS. He also worked for Bing Crosby, troubleshooting the photo finish timer system at Del Mar Racetrack.

During World War II and after, Belock developed the REAC computer for Reeves Instrument Corporation (for which he became a vice president and general manager). The REAC was one of the first electronic computing machines, and it was used for the U.S. Navy's Project Cyclone.

Belock joined with Helen Neushaefer (president of Neushaefer Cosmetics) to found the Belock Instrument Corporation in November 1950. The company prospered over the next four years – going from no sales to $10,600,000 and seven staff to over 1,200. Defense electronics equipment was designed and built in a 100,000-square-foot (9,300 m^{2}) building in College Point, Queens.

The New York Times described Harry Belock in March 1955 as a thin intense 47-year-old. He was an avid amateur golfer, and enjoyed using his 50-foot (15 m) flush deck Chris-Craft yacht, the Bar-L-Rick, for engineering projects and cruising. His home and yacht were filled with electronic devices.

In 1958, Belock joined with producer Bert Whyte to start Everest Records, a division of his Belock Instrument Corporation.

Belock patented five inventions between 1941 and 1961. He served as a consultant to Sperry Gyroscope, General Dynamics Pomona Division, and the Applied Physics Laboratory of Johns Hopkins University. He also started Harry Belock Associates, an engineering consulting company. Belock was awarded the U.S. Navy Distinguished Public Service Award in 1965. He was a fellow of the Institute of Electrical and Electronics Engineers. Belock received a Doctorate in Science degree from the Pratt Institute in 1967, where he was also Alumnus of the Year. He was also a member of the engineering honor society Tau Beta Pi.

He died November 8, 1999, in Long Beach, New York.

== Family history ==
Belock's parents were Russian immigrants: father Nathan (1876–1972) and mother Mattie. He had three sisters: Mary, Tillie, and Honnie Duncan. He was married to Lilyan Davidoff in Florida in 1941. Lilyan, born November 12, 1910, preceded him in death on July 25, 1984.
