= Take the "A" Train (Betty Roché album) =

Studio album by Betty Roché
- Released: 1956
- Recorded: 1956
- Genre: Jazz
- Label: Bethlehem BCP 64

Betty Roché chronology
Take the "A" Train (1956)	Singin' & Swingin (1961)

Professional ratings
Review scores
Source	Rating
AllMusic	4.5/5 stars

Take the "A" Train is a 1956 album by the American jazz singer Betty Roché. It was Roché's debut album. Take the "A" Train was reissued on CD in 2000, with two alternate takes of "Go Away Blues".

== Reception ==
Scott Yanow reviewed the album for AllMusic and wrote that the album was Roché's "definitive session" and that "Roché is heard at her best on this set of standards", concluding that it was an "excellent release".

== Track listing ==
1. "Take the "A" Train" (Billy Strayhorn) – 3:13
2. "Something to Live For" (Duke Ellington, Strayhorn) – 4:04
3. "In a Mellow Tone" (Ellington, Milt Gabler) – 2:29
4. "Time After Time" (Sammy Cahn, Jule Styne) – 3:05
5. "Go Away Blues" (Ellington) – 3:18
6. "Can't Help Lovin' Dat Man" (Oscar Hammerstein II, Jerome Kern) – 3:42
7. "Route 66" (Bobby Troup) – 4:34
8. "All My Life" (Harry Akst, Benny Davis) – 3:48
9. "I Just Got the Message, Baby" – 2:39
10. "All Too Soon" (Ellington, Carl Sigman) – 4:07
11. "You Don't Love Me No More" (Ellington) – 3:17
12. "September in the Rain" (Al Dubin, Harry Warren) – 3:50

== Personnel ==
- Betty Roché – vocals
- Conte Candoli – trumpet
- Donn Trenner – piano
- Eddie Costa – vibraphone
- Whitey Mitchell – double bass
- David Williams – drums
- Leonard Feather – liner notes
- Burt Goldblatt – cover art
- Rick Essig, Frank Abbey, John Cue – engineer
- Lyn Bradley – reissue package design
- Tom Moulton – remastering
