= Stopper =

Stopper may refer to:

- Bung, a plug used to stop the opening of a container
  - Laboratory rubber stopper, a specific type of bung
- Plug (sanitation), used to stop a drainage outlet
- Defender (association football), in soccer (association football)
- Milkor 37/38mm and 40mm Stopper, a gun
- Alternative name for a whitewater hole, in whitewater kayaking
- A local train that calls at almost every station, including very small ones
- Stopper, a term in the game of bridge
- Stopper, a baseball term for a key pitcher
- Slang for stopwatch, a handheld timepiece designed to measure the amount of time
- Stopper knot, a type of a knot at the end of the rope
- Stopper, a common name for some plant species in the genus Eugenia

== See also ==
- Stop (disambiguation)
