= 1st Place =

Studio album by Jimmy Knepper
- Released: 1986
- Recorded: February 9, 1982
- Studio: Van Gelder Studio, Englewood Cliffs, NJ
- Genre: Jazz
- Label: BlackHawk
- Producer: Herb Wong

Jimmy Knepper chronology
Primrose Path (1980)	1st Place (1986)	I Dream Too Much (1984)

1st Place is an album led by trombonist Jimmy Knepper which was recorded in 1982 and originally released on the BlackHawk label in 1986.

== Reception ==
Professional ratings
Review scores
Source	Rating
Allmusic	4/5 stars

The Allmusic review by Scott Yanow states "Trombonist Jimmy Knepper is well featured on this out of print LP from the defunct Black Hawk label, both as a highly original trombonist and as a composer".

== Track listing ==
All compositions by Jimmy Knepper.

1. "Leave of Absinthe" – 6:55
2. "Awesome" – 6:44
3. "Distress Dismay" – 8:28
4. "Fallen Crest" – 8:20
5. "When I See You" – 6:48
6. "Idol of the Flies" – 8:00

== Personnel ==
- Jimmy Knepper – trombone
- Bruce Forman – guitar
- Mike Richmond – bass
- Billy Hart – drums
