= Live at the Theatre Boulogne-Billancourt/Paris, Vol. 2 =

1988 live album by Mingus Dynasty

Live album by Mingus Dynasty
- Recorded: June 8, 1988
- Venue: Theatre Boulogne-Billancourt, Paris, France
- Genre: Jazz
- Label: Soul Note

Live at the Theatre Boulogne-Billancourt/Paris, Vol. 2 is an album by Mingus Dynasty, billed as Big Band Charlie Mingus.

== Recording and music ==
Live at the Theatre Boulogne-Billancourt/Paris, Vol. 2 was recorded on June 8, 1988. The band was billed as Big Band Charlie Mingus, a larger version of Mingus Dynasty, which plays the music of Charles Mingus. The performances were conducted by Jimmy Knepper.

The central piece is "The Black Saint and the Sinner Lady", that uses "Ellingtonian gestures: plunger mutes (including quotes from 'It Don't Mean a Thing, If It Ain't Got That Swing'); a wah-wah trombone and drums (Billy Hart) duet; a slow fugue section similar to Ellington's in 'A Tone Parallel to Harlem'; and a solo piano interlude (Jaki Byard).

== Releases ==
The album was released by Soul Note. It was later included, with Live at the Theatre Boulogne-Billancourt/Paris, Vol. 1 and other albums, in the CAM Jazz 4-CD compilation Mingus Dynasty Big Band Charlie Mingus.

== Track listing ==
1. "Boogie Stop Shuffle"
2. "My Jelly Roll Soul"
3. "The Black Saint and the Sinner Lady"
4. "Goodbye Pork Pie Hat"

== Personnel ==
- Nick Brignola – baritone sax, flute
- Clifford Jordan – tenor sax, soprano sax
- David Murray – tenor sax, bass clarinet
- John Handy – alto sax
- Randy Brecker – trumpet
- Jon Faddis – cornet
- Jimmy Knepper – trombone, conductor
- Mike Zwerin – trombone
- Jaki Byard – piano
- Reggie Johnson – bass
- Billy Hart – drums
