= Don Lanphere =

American jazz saxophonist

- Born: Donald Gale Lanphere; June 26, 1928; Wenatchee, Washington, U.S.
- Died: October 9, 2003 (aged 75) Redmond, Washington, U.S.
- Genres: Jazz
- Occupation: Musician
- Instrument: Saxophone
- Years active: 1947–2003
- Labels: Hep, Origin

Donald Gale Lanphere (June 26, 1928 – October 9, 2003) was an American jazz tenor and soprano saxophonist, known for his 1940s and 1950s work, and recordings with Fats Navarro (in 1948), Woody Herman (1949), Claude Thornhill, Sonny Dunham, Billy May, and Charlie Barnet.

== Biography ==
He was born in Wenatchee, Washington, United States. Lanphere briefly studied music at Northwestern University in the 1940s, but moved to New York City as a member of Johnny Bothwell's group to become part of the bebop jazz scene. In New York, Lanphere was in a relationship with Chan Richardson, who later married Charlie Parker and then Phil Woods.

In 1951, Lanphere was arrested and charged with heroin possession in New York City. After his release from jail, he worked in his family's music store in Wenatchee, where he met Midge Hess. They married in 1953. In the late 1950s and early 1960s, Lanphere performed with Herb Pomeroy and with Woody Herman.

Lanphere was mostly inactive musically throughout most of the 1960s, but began performing in the Seattle area after becoming a born again Christian in 1969, at which time he also stopped using drugs and alcohol. In the 1980s, Lanphere began recording again and started releasing albums, doing tours in New York City and Kansas City in 1983 and a European tour in 1985.

In his later years, Lanphere was a jazz educator in the Pacific Northwest, giving lessons out of his home in Kirkland, Washington. He instructed clinics and small groups, as well as performed, at the Bud Shank Jazz Workshop, an annual, week-long summer camp in Port Townsend, Washington for jazz students of all ages. The Bud Shank Jazz Workshop coincided with the annual Port Townsend Jazz Festival.

He died in Redmond, Washington, of hepatitis C at the age of 75.

== Discography ==
- From Out of Nowhere (Hep, 1982)
- Into Somewhere (Hep, 1983)
- Don Loves Midge (Hep, 1984)
- Stop (Hep, 1986)
- Don Lanphere & Larry Coryell (Hep, 1990)
- Lopin (Hep, 1992)
- Jazz Worship/A Closer Walk (DGL, 1993)
- Get Happy (Origin, 1996)
- Don Still Loves Midge (Hep, 1997)
- Year 'Round Christmas (Origin, 1999)
- Like a Bird (Origin, 2000)
- Home at Last (Origin, 2001)
- Where Do You Start? (Origin, 2003)

With Fats Navarro

- Blues in Teddy's Flat (Dial)
- Fats Navarro Quintet (Prestige)

With the Seattle Repertory Jazz Orchestra

- SRJO Live (Origin)
- Sacred Music of Duke Ellington (Origin)
