= The Pepper-Knepper Quintet =

Studio album by Pepper Adams and Jimmy Knepper
- Released: 1958
- Recorded: March 25, 1958
- Studio: Beltone Studios, NYC
- Genre: Jazz
- Length: 45:44
- Label: MetroJazz; E 1004
- Producer: Leonard Feather

Pepper Adams chronology
The Cool Sound of Pepper Adams (1957)	The Pepper-Knepper Quintet (1958)	10 to 4 at the 5 Spot (1958)

Jimmy Knepper chronology
A Swinging Introduction to Jimmy Knepper (1957)	The Pepper-Knepper Quintet (1958)	Cunningbird (1976)

The Pepper-Knepper Quintet is an album led by baritone saxophonist Pepper Adams and trombonist Jimmy Knepper which was recorded in 1958 and originally released on the MetroJazz label.

== Reception ==
Professional ratings
Review scores
Source	Rating
Allmusic	4/5 stars
The Penguin Guide to Jazz	3/4 stars

The Allmusic review by Scott Yanow states "The blend between baritone and trombone is quite effective, the musicians all take consistently excellent solos and the music is state-of-the-art 1958 modern mainstream jazz". The Penguin Guide to Jazz described the pairing as producing "a similar blend to that on Cool Sound, but with more expressive resonance and mobility".

== Track listing ==
1. "Minor Catastrophe" (Jon Hendricks) – 6:05
2. "All Too Soon" (Duke Ellington, Carl Sigman) – 5:53
3. "Beaubien" (Pepper Adams) – 6:23
4. "Adams in the Apple" (Jimmy Knepper) – 4:49
5. "Riverside Drive" (Leonard Feather) – 5:13
6. "I Didn't Know About You" (Ellington, Bob Russell) – 4:27
7. "Primrose Path" (Knepper) – 7:04

== Personnel ==
- Pepper Adams – baritone saxophone
- Jimmy Knepper – trombone
- Wynton Kelly – piano, organ - track 6
- Doug Watkins – bass
- Elvin Jones – drums
