= Jimmy Knepper =

American jazz trombonist (1927–2003)

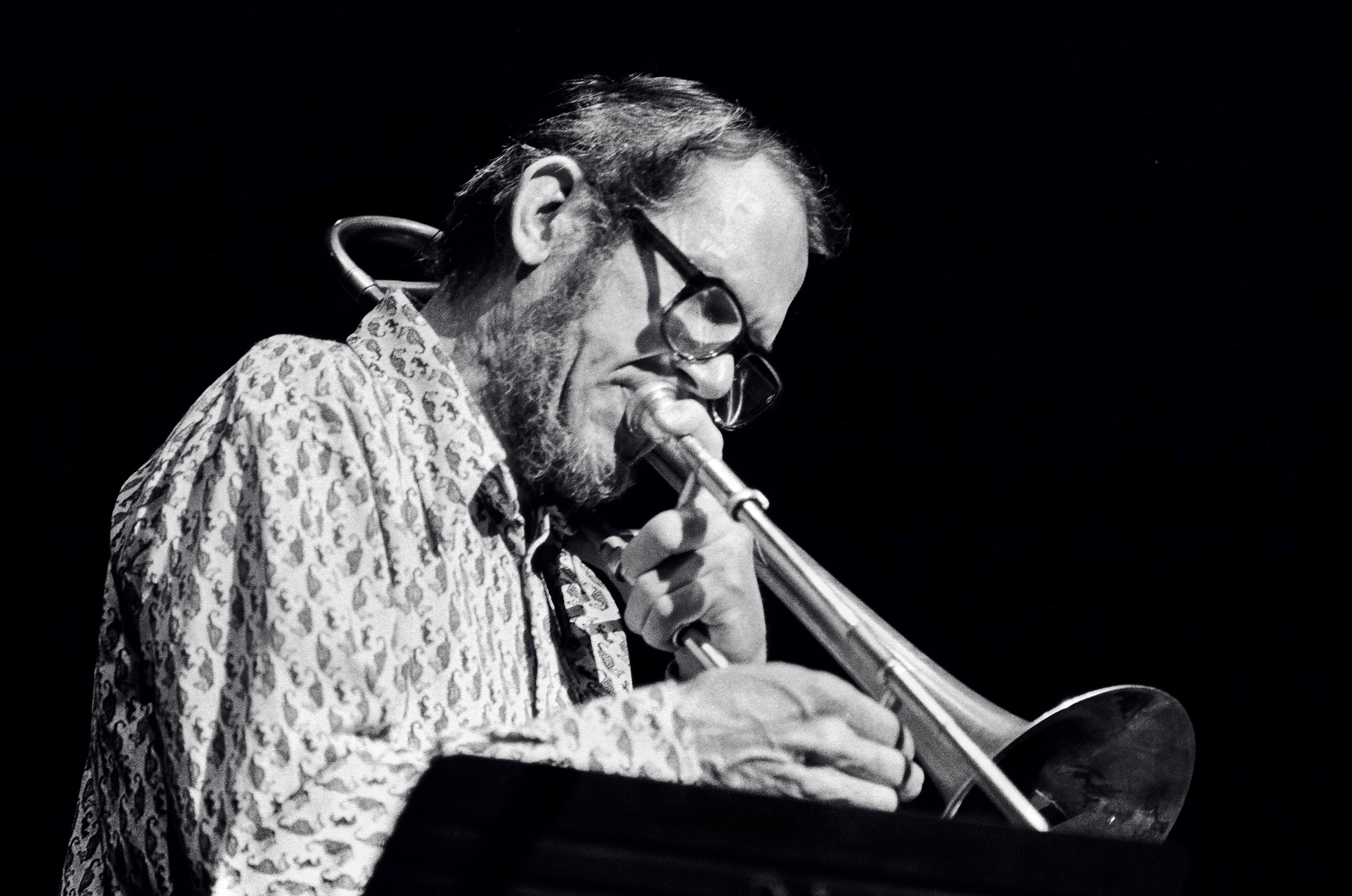
- Jimmy Knepper with the National Jazz Ensemble

Background information
- Born: James Minter Knepper; November 22, 1927; Los Angeles, California, U.S.
- Died: June 14, 2003 (aged 75) Triadelphia, West Virginia, U.S.
- Genres: Jazz
- Occupation: Musician
- Instrument: Trombone

James Minter Knepper (November 22, 1927 – June 14, 2003) was an American jazz trombonist. In addition to his own recordings as leader, Knepper performed and recorded with Charlie Barnet, Woody Herman, Claude Thornhill, Stan Kenton, Benny Goodman, Gil Evans, Thad Jones and Mel Lewis, Toshiko Akiyoshi and Lew Tabackin, and, most famously, Charles Mingus in the late-1950s and early-1960s.

== Biography ==
Knepper was born in Los Angeles, California, United States, the second son of a nurse and a police officer. His parents divorced shortly after his birth, and his mother had to take her abusive husband to court in order to get child support. He and his older brother, Robert, were sent to several boarding and military schools, Page Military Academy and St. John's Military Academy, while their mother worked. He picked up his first instrument, an alto horn, at the age of six while he was a pupil there. His first teacher persuaded him to put aside the alto horn and pick up the trombone because, as he said, he had a "trombone mouth". He played his first professional gigs in Los Angeles and traveled to Spokane, Washington, at the age of 15. He graduated high school, and later, attended classes at Los Angeles Community College.

Knepper married Maxine Helen Fields, a trumpet player with the all-female jazz band the International Sweethearts of Rhythm on May 8, 1954, at a civil ceremony in Tucson, Arizona, while he was on tour with the Maynard Ferguson Band. They had two children: a daughter, Robin Reid Knepper Mahonen, and a son, Timothy Jay Knepper, who predeceased him. Knepper chose the names "Robin" and "Jay" to honor his idol, Charlie Parker, whom the jazz world knew as "Bird". He had four grandchildren.

In 1959, the U.S. State Department funded a trip for bandleader Herbie Mann to visit Africa, after they heard his version of African Suite. In a stroke of serendipity, Knepper replaced Willie Dennis as trombonist in the band for this tour.

The 14-week tour took place from December 31, 1959, to April 5, 1960. The musicians were Herbie Mann, bandleader, flute, and saxophone; Johnny Rae, vibraphonist and arranger; Doc Cheatham, trumpet; Jimmy Knepper, trombone; Don Payne, bass; Carlos "Patato" Valdes, conguero; José Mangual, bongos. Destinations listed on official itinerary were Sierra Leone, Liberia, Nigeria, Mozambique, Rhodesia, Tanganyika, Kenya, Ethiopia, Sudan, Morocco, Tunisia. Knepper documented this tour meticulously in a series of letters he sent home to his wife, daughter, and son. These letters were recently found carefully preserved in a dusty box in the attic of the family home, and have now been transcribed by his daughter. They provide a glimpse into the inner circles of a notable piece of jazz history, and the life of a touring musician, who was also a devoted family man. He paints vivid portraits of the personal life of the musicians he worked with, and his descriptions of the Africa's landscapes and people provide a vivid portrait of an era in which there were few civil rights for Africans in their own lands. Knepper's daughter is hoping to publish these letters.

In 1962, Knepper toured the Soviet Union with Benny Goodman's big band as part of a cultural exchange during the Cold War, in which the Bolshoi Ballet also came to the US. This groundbreaking yet disastrous tour was also documented in Knepper's letters.

Knepper also played in the pit orchestra through the entire run of the Broadway show Funny Girl, with Barbra Streisand, and later, Mimi Hines. After seventeen previews, the Broadway production opened on March 26, 1964, at the Winter Garden Theatre, subsequently transferring to the Majestic Theatre and the Broadway Theatre to complete its total run of 1,348 performances. In 1967–1968, he played in the pit orchestra at the Mark Hellinger Theatre for An Evening with Marlene Dietrich, for which Dietrich received a Tony Award in 1968. Knepper also appeared on and off Broadway in On Your Toes, and The Me Nobody Knows.

While he was playing Funny Girl, Knepper became a member of the Thad Jones/Mel Lewis Orchestra, a big band formed by trumpeter Thad Jones and drummer Mel Lewis around 1965, which began the 40-year tradition of Monday night jazz shows at the Village Vanguard in New York's Greenwich Village. The band performed for twelve years in its original incarnation, but since the death of Lewis in 1990 it has been known as the Vanguard Jazz Orchestra. They have maintained a Monday-night residency at the Village Vanguard for four decades. Knepper again toured the USSR, as well as Japan and Europe, this time with the Jones/Lewis band, and appeared with them at the Montreux Jazz Festival in 1974.

In 1969, Knepper toured and recorded You Never Know Who Your Friends Are, with keyboardist Al Kooper, in the jazz period which followed his departure from Blood, Sweat & Tears. Knepper appeared on this concert tour which included shows at the Philadelphia Spectrum, and in Atlanta, where he briefly met Janis Joplin.

In 1980, he received a Grammy Award nomination, for Best Jazz Instrumentalist Performance, Soloist, for his album, Cunningbird.

Knepper received the Best Trombonist award from DownBeat's Readers' Poll four years running from 1981 to 1984; he also achieved first place in the DownBeat Critics' Poll in 1981, and then five years running from 1983 to 1987.

== With Charles Mingus ==
Although Knepper worked with some of the most notable jazz musicians of the 20th century, he was perhaps best known for his collaboration and stormy relationship with bassist and composer Charles Mingus.

Mingus's temper was notoriously bad, and he twice hit Knepper. Once, while onstage at a memorial concert in Philadelphia, Mingus reportedly attempted to crush the hands of his pianist, Toshiko Akiyoshi, with the instrument's keyboard cover, then punched Knepper; however, the legitimacy of this story has been called into question by both Akiyoshi and Mingus's son Eric Mingus. Later, Mingus reportedly punched Knepper in the mouth while the two men were working together at Mingus's apartment on a score for "Epitaph", in preparation for what became his disastrous concert at New York Town Hall, on October 12, 1962. The blow broke one of Knepper's teeth, ruined his embouchure and resulted in the loss of the top octave of his range on the trombone for almost two years. This attack ended their working relationship, and Knepper was unable to perform at the concert. Charged with assault, Mingus appeared in court in January 1963 and was given a suspended sentence. According to his daughter, Robin, Mingus also later mailed heroin to Knepper's home and made an anonymous phone call to the police. A little girl at the time, she remembered the police questioning her father after the mailman delivered the package. Nevertheless, in the 1970s, the two eventually reconciled thoroughly enough to play together in concert and on at least one of Mingus's last albums.

Following Mingus's death, and the death of the first Mingus Dynasty bandleader, drummer Dannie Richmond, Knepper led the Mingus Dynasty orchestra and toured the Middle East and Europe.

== Death ==
In 2003, aged 75, Knepper died of complications of Parkinson's disease, in Triadelphia, West Virginia.

== Discography ==
=== As leader ===
- Jazz Workshop Presents: "Jimmy Knepper" (Debut, 1957; Danish EP reissued on Mingus Rarities, Volume 1, OJC)
- A Swinging Introduction to Jimmy Knepper (Bethlehem, 1957)
- The Pepper-Knepper Quintet (MetroJazz Records, 1958)
- Cunningbird (Steeplechase, 1976)
- Jimmy Knepper in L.A. (Inner City, 1977)
- Just Friends (Hep, 1978) with Joe Temperley
- Tell Me... (Daybreak, 1979)
- Primrose Path (Hep, 1980) with Bobby Wellins
- 1st Place (BlackHawk, 1982 [1986])
- I Dream Too Much (Soul Note, 1984)
- Dream Dancing (Criss Cross Jazz, 1986)
- T-Bop (Soul Note, 1991) with Eric Felten

=== As sideman ===
With Charles Mingus

- Tijuana Moods (1957) RCA
- East Coasting (1957) Bethlehem
- A Modern Jazz Symposium of Music and Poetry (1957) Bethlehem
- The Clown (1957) Atlantic
- Mingus Ah Um (1959) Columbia
- Mingus Dynasty (1959) Columbia
- Blues & Roots (1959) Atlantic
- Mingus Revisited (1960) Mercury
- Reincarnation of a Lovebird (1960) Candid
- Oh Yeah (1961) Atlantic,
- Tonight at Noon (1957–61) Atlantic
- Cumbia & Jazz Fusion (1978) Atlantic

With Mose Allison

- Swingin' Machine (Atlantic, 1963)

With Joshua Breakstone

- Evening Star (Contemporary, 1988)

With Benny Carter

- Central City Sketches (MusicMasters, 1987)

With Richard Davis

- Muses for Richard Davis (MPS, 1969)

With Gil Evans

- Out of the Cool (1960) Impulse!
- The Individualism of Gil Evans (1964) Verve
- Blues in Orbit (Enja, 1971)
- Where Flamingos Fly (1971) Artists House
- Collaboration with Helen Merrill (1987) EmArcy

With Ricky Ford

- Shorter Ideas (Muse, 1984)

With Dizzy Gillespie

- Perceptions (Verve, 1961)

With Jazz Artists Guild

- Newport Rebels (Candid, 1961)

With Langston Hughes

- Weary Blues (MGM, 1959)

With Clark Terry

- Color Changes (Candid, 1960)

With Kai Winding

- The Incredible Kai Winding Trombones (1960) Impulse!

With Chuck Israels

- National Jazz Ensemble directed by Chuck Israels (Chiaroscuro, 1976)

With Herbie Mann

- My Kinda Groove (Atlantic, 1964)
- Our Mann Flute (Atlantic, 1966)

With Kenny Burrell

- Guitar Forms (Verve, 1965)

With Gary Burton

- A Genuine Tong Funeral (RCA, 1967)

With the Jazz Composer's Orchestra

- The Jazz Composer's Orchestra (1968) JCOA
- Escalator over the Hill with Carla Bley (1971) JCOA

With the Thad Jones/Mel Lewis Orchestra

- The Big Band Sound of Thad Jones/Mel Lewis featuring Miss Ruth Brown (1968) Solid State
- Monday Night (1968) Solid State
- Central Park North (1969) Solid State
- Basle, 1969 (1996) TCB Music – recorded 1969
- Consummation (1970) Solid State
- Suite for Pops (1972) A&M
- Live in Tokyo (1974) Denon Jazz
- Potpourri (1974) Philadelphia International
- Thad Jones / Mel Lewis and Manuel De Sica (1974) PAUSA

With Dick Katz

- In High Profile (Bee Hive, 1984)

With Lee Konitz

- Lee Konitz Nonet (Chiaroscuro, 1977)
- Yes, Yes, Nonet (SteepleChase, 1979)
- Live at Laren (Soul Note, 1979 [1984])

With Al Kooper

- You Never Know Who Your Friends Are (1969) Columbia

With the Toshiko Akiyoshi – Lew Tabackin Big Band

- Road Time (1976) RCA/Victor

With George Adams & Dannie Richmond

- Hand to Hand (1980) Soul Note
- Gentleman's Agreement (1983) Soul Note

With Mingus Dynasty

- Chair In The Sky (Electra 1979)
- Live at Montreux (Atlantic 1980)
- Reincarnation (Soul Note 1982)
- Mingus' Sounds of Love (Soul Note 1987)
- Live at the Theatre Boulogne-Billancourt/Paris, Vol. 1 (Soul Note 1988)
- Live at the Theatre Boulogne-Billancourt/Paris, Vol. 2 (Soul Note 1988)
