= Lightly and Politely =

Studio album by Betty Roché
- Released: 1961
- Recorded: January 24, 1961 at Van Gelder Studio, Englewood Cliffs, New Jersey
- Genre: Jazz
- Length: 35:14
- Label: Prestige PRLP 7198

Betty Roché chronology
Singin' & Swingin' (1960)	Lightly and Politely (1961)

Professional ratings
Review scores
Source	Rating
AllMusic	4/5 stars
The Penguin Guide to Jazz Recordings	3/4 stars

Lightly and Politely is a 1960 album by the American jazz singer Betty Roché. This was the last album Roché recorded.

== Reception ==
Scott Yanow reviewed the album for AllMusic and wrote: "It is ironic that what is arguably singer Betty Roché's finest all-around recording was also her last". Yanow wrote that "Roché improvises constantly and uplifts a variety of superior standards...It's recommended, particularly to jazz fans not aware of Betty Roché's musical talents".

== Track listing ==
1. "Someone to Watch Over Me" (George Gershwin, Ira Gershwin) – 4:46
2. "Why Shouldn't I?" (Cole Porter) – 3:28
3. "Jim" (Caesar Petrillo, Edward Ross, Nelson Shawn) – 4:33
4. "Polka Dots and Moonbeams" (Johnny Burke, Jimmy Van Heusen) – 3:52
5. "For All We Know" (J. Fred Coots, Sam M. Lewis) – 2:41
6. "Rocks in My Bed" (Duke Ellington) – 4:11
7. "Just Squeeze Me (But Please Don't Tease Me)" (Ellington, Lee Gaines, Fats Waller, Clarence Williams) – 2:40
8. "I Got It Bad (and That Ain't Good)" (Ellington, Paul Francis Webster) – 3:42
9. "Maybe You'll Be There" (Rube Bloom, Sammy Gallop) – 3:37
10. "I Had the Craziest Dream" (Mack Gordon, Harry Warren) – 2:12

== Personnel ==
- Betty Roché – vocals
- Jimmy Neely – piano
- Wally Richardson – guitar
- Michel Mulia – double bass
- Rudy Lawless – drums
- Rudy Van Gelder – engineer
- Joe Goldberg – liner notes
- Phil DeLancie – digital remastering
