= Bethlehem Records =

American jazz independent record label

- Parent company: BMG Rights Management
- Founded: 1953
- Founder: Gus Wildi
- Status: Defunct
- Genre: Jazz
- Country of origin: U.S.
- Location: New York City

Bethlehem Records was an American jazz independent record label, founded by Gus Wildi in 1953.

== History ==
Bethlehem is remembered for its jazz releases from the 1950s. Producers included Creed Taylor and Teddy Charles. Bethlehem released the first albums recorded by singers Chris Connor (the dual releases Chris Connor Sings Lullabys for Lovers and Chris Connor Sings Lullabys of Birdland) in 1954, Nina Simone (Little Girl Blue) in 1958, and singer/actress Julie London. Julie London recorded four songs that were released on the EP Julie London, and they were later added to the compilation LP Bethlehem's Girlfriends in 1955, which also featured Chris Connor and Carmen McRae. Bethlehem recorded the debut album by Marilyn Moore and the album Somebody Loves Me by Jerri Winters, in addition to many modern jazz musicians including Howard McGhee, Herbie Nichols, Pat Moran McCoy, and Oscar Pettiford.

In 1958, Bethlehem began a distributing deal with King Records. In 1962, Bethlehem Records was sold and absorbed by King Records. After Syd Nathan died in 1968, King was acquired by Starday Records and relaunched as Starday and King Records. It was purchased in 1970 by Lin Broadcasting and in 1972 by Tennessee Recording & Publishing, until acquired by Gusto Records in 1974. At that time, Bethlehem was purchased by the Cayre brothers' Salsoul Records, which initially intended to release its back catalog for inexpensive 8-track tapes in the 1970s. By 1993, the Bethlehem name was revived as Bethlehem Music Company, although Salsoul was often used as an imprint. The Verse Music Group obtained its licensing in 2010. In 2015 BMG Rights Management acquired the catalog of Verse Music, including the Bethlehem label.

During 2013–2014, Verse and Naxos reissued the 1950s catalogue on LP, CD, and digital download. This included music by Art Blakey, Chris Connor, Paula Castle, John Coltrane, Dexter Gordon, Nina Simone, Mel Tormé, and Zoot Sims.

=== Selected acquisitions ===
In 1956, Period Records sold its jazz LP catalog (10 disks) to Bethlehem. Production of all its jazz recordings was supervised by Leonard Feather. Several of the Period recordings had been previously released by Jazztone for mail-order club release.

== Discography ==
=== BCP 1000 Series ===
The BCP 1000 Series of 10 inch LP records commenced in September 1954 and ran until July 1955 when the label switched to 12 in LP releases.

Catalog	Artist	Album
BCP 1001	Chris Connor	Chris Connor Sings Lullabys of Birdland
BCP 1002	Chris Connor	Chris Connor Sings Lullabys for Lovers
BCP 1003	Oscar Pettiford	Oscar Pettiford
BCP 1004	Bobby Scott	Great Scott
BCP 1005	Ruby Braff	Ruby Braff Swings
BCP 1006	Hank D'Amico	Holiday with Hank
BCP 1007	Charlie Shavers	Horn o' Plenty
BCP 1008	Aaron Sachs	Aaron Sachs Sextet
BCP 1009	Bobby Scott	The Compositions of Bobby Scott: East Coast Jazz 1
BCP 1010	Vinnie Burke	East Coast Jazz/2
BCP 1011	Pete Brown	Peter the Great
BCP 1012	Joe Puma	East Coast Jazz/3
BCP 1013	Eddie Shu	I Only Have Eyes for Shu
BCP 1014	Jonah Jones	Jonah Jones
BCP 1015	Terry Pollard	Terry Pollard
BCP 1016	Conte Candoli	Sincerely, Conte
BCP 1017	Stan Levey	Stan Levey Plays the Composition of Bill Holman, Bob Cooper and Jimmy Giuffre
BCP 1018	Herbie Mann	East Coast Jazz/4
BCP 1019	Oscar Pettiford	Basically Duke
BCP 1020	Milt Hinton	East Coast Jazz/5
BCP 1021	Charlie Shavers	The Most Intimate
BCP 1022	Charlie Mariano	Mariano
BCP 1023	Carmen McRae	Carmen McRae
BCP 1024	Stu Williamson	Sapphire
BCP 1025	Herbie Harper	Please, No More Shaggy Dog Stories! I'd Much Rather Listen to Herbie Harper
BCP 1026	Bob Hardaway	Lou's Blue
BCP 1027	Helen Carr	Down in the Depths on the 90th Floor
BCP 1028	Max Bennett	Hence! Home, You Idle Creatures: Get You Home: and Lend an Ear to Max Bennett
BCP 1029	Bobby Scott	The Compositions of Bobby Scott: 2
BCP 1030	Bobby Troup	The Songs of Bobby Troup
BCP 1031	The Australian Jazz Quartet	The Australian Jazz Quartet
BCP 1032	Ruby Braff	Holiday in Braff
BCP 1033	Red Mitchell, Bob Brookmeyer and Zoot Sims	Happy Minors
BCP 1034	Ruby Braff	Ball at Bethlehem with Braff
BCP 1035	Dick Wetmore	Dick Wetmore
BCP 1036	Paula Castle	Lost Love
BCP 1039	Joe DeRise	Joe DeRise Sings
BCP 1040	Russ Garcia	Wigville

=== BCP 12-Inch "Deluxe" Series ===
The BCP "Deluxe" Series of 12 inch LP records commenced in 1955 and ran until 1960. Early releases consisted of reissues of 10 inch albums from the BCP 1000 Series.

In the move to create the BCP 6000 series in the fall of 1956, Bethlehem removed three original recordings from the deluxe series and replaced them with later recordings. These are noted in the table with both releases shown.

Catalog	Artist	Album	Notes
BCP 1	Bobby Scott and Terry Pollard	Bobby Scott and Terry Pollard	Compilation of BCP-1004 and BCP-1015 (not released)
BCP 2	Oscar Pettiford and Red Mitchell	Jazz Mainstream	Compilation of BCP-1019 and BCP-1033
BCP 3	Eddie Shu and Bob Hardaway	Jazz Practitioners	Compilation of BCP-1013 and BCP-1026
BCP 4	Pete Brown and Jonah Jones	Jazz Kaleidoscope	Compilation of BCP-1011 and BCP-1014
BCP 5	Ruby Braff	A Ruby Braff Omnibus	Compilation of BCP-1005 and BCP-1034
BCP 6	Oscar Pettiford and Vinnie Burke	Bass by Pettiford/Burke	Compilation of BCP-1003 and BCP-1010
BCP 7	Hank D'Amico and Aaron Sachs	We Brought Our Axes	Compilation of BCP-1006 and BCP-1008
BCP 8	Bobby Scott	The Compositions of Bobby Scott	Compilation of BCP-1009 and BCP-1029
BCP 9	Conte Candoli and Stan Levey	Westcoasting with Conte Candoli and Stan Levey	Compilation of BCP-1016 and BCP-1017
BCP 10	Milt Hinton	East Coast Jazz/5	Reissue of BCP-1020 with additional material
BCP 11	Bob Dorough	Devil May Care	
BCP 12	Don Elliott	Mellophone	
BCP 13	Kai Winding and J. J. Johnson	K + J.J. / East Coast Jazz/7	Later removed from this series to become BCP 6001 and replaced.
BCP 13	Ralph Sharon and Sue Ryan	Mr. and Mrs. Jazz	Replaced original BCP 13 issue.
BCP 14	Urbie Green	East Coast Jazz/6	
BCP 15	Don Elliot	Don Elliott Sings	
BCP 16	Hal McKusick	East Coast Jazz/8	
BCP 17	Joe Roland	Easy Living	
BCP 18	Sam Most	I'm Nuts About the Most...Sam That Is!	
BCP 19	Bobby Troup	A Great Mercer Songbook: Bobby Troup Sings Johnny Mercer	
BCP 20	Chris Connor	This Is Chris	
BCP 21	Red Allen, Cozy Cole and Charlie Shavers	Jazz at the Metropole Cafe	
BCP 22	Smith/Glamann Quintet	Poinciana	
BCP 23	Frances Faye	I'm Wild Again	
BCP 24	Herbie Mann Quartet	Flamingo	
BCP 25	Charlie Mariano	Charlie Mariano	
BCP 26	Frank Rosolino	I Play Trombone	
BCP 27	Charlie Shavers	Gershwin, Shavers and Strings	
BCP 28	The Six	6	
BCP 29	Bud Freeman	Newport News	
BCP 30	Conte Candoli	Toots Sweet	
BCP 31	The Australian Jazz Quartet	The Australian Jazz Quartet/Quintet	Later removed from this series to become BCP 6002 and replaced
BCP 31	Stu Williamson	Stu Williamson Plays	Replaced original BCP 31 issue.
BCP 32	Jack Teagarden	Jazz Great	
BCP 33	Oscar Pettiford	Oscar Pettiford	
BCP 34	Mel Tormé	It's a Blue World	
BCP 35	Bobby Troup	The Distinctive Style of Bobby Troup	
BCP 36	Dexter Gordon	Daddy Plays the Horn	
BCP 37	Stan Levey	This Time the Drum's on Me	
BCP 38	Red Mitchell	Jam for Your Bread	
BCP 39	The Australian Jazz Quartet	The Australian Jazz Quartet	Later removed from this series to become BCP 6003 and replaced.
BCP 39	Sal Salvador	Shades of Sal Salvador	Replaced original BCP 39 issue.
BCP 40	Herbie Mann and Sam Most	The Herbie Mann-Sam Most Quintet	
BCP 41	Ralph Sharon	Ralph Sharon Trio	
BCP 42	Howard McGhee	The Return of Howard McGhee	
BCP 43	Johnny Hartman	Songs from the Heart	
BCP 44	The Jazz City Workshop	The Jazz City Workshop	Herbie Harper, Larry Bunker, Marty Paich, Curtis Counce, Frankie Capp and Jack Costanzo
BCP 45	Helen Carr	Why Do I Love You	
BCP 46	Russ Garcia Orchestra	Four Horns and a Lush Life	
BCP 47	Terry Morel	Songs of a Woman in Love	
BCP 48	Max Bennett	Max Bennett	
BCP 49	Charlie Mariano	Charlie Mariano Plays	
BCP 50	Max Bennett	Max Bennett Plays	
BCP 51	Joe DeRise	Joe DeRise	
BCP 52	Mel Tormé	Mel Tormé and the Marty Paich Dek-Tette	
BCP 53	Peggy Connelly with Russ Garcia "Wigville" Band	That Old Black Magic	
BCP 54	Claude Williamson	Claude Williamson	
BCP 55	Stu Williamson	Stu Williamson	
BCP 56	Chris Connor	Chris	
BCP 57	The Six	The View from Jazzbo's Head	
BCP 58	Herbie Mann	Herbie Mann Plays	Reissue of BCP-1018 with additional material
BCP 59	Sal Salvador {{{last}}}	Frivolous Sal	
BCP 60	Duke Ellington	Historically Speaking	
BCP 61	Howard McGhee	Life Is Just a Bowl of Cherries	
BCP 62	Frances Faye	Relaxin' with Frances Faye	
BCP 63	Herbie Mann	Love and the Weather	
BCP 64	Betty Roché	Take the "A" Train	
BCP 65	Charles Mingus	The Jazz Experiments of Charlie Mingus	Compilation of Period Records SPL 1107 and SPL 1111
BCP 66	Osie Johnson	The Happy Jazz of Osie Johnson	
BCP 67	Charlie Shavers and Maxine Sullivan	The Complete Charlie Shavers with Maxine Sullivan	
BCP 68	Ralph Burns	Bijou	
BCP 69	Claude Williamson	'Round Midnight	
BCP 70	Frank Socolow	Sounds by Socolow	
BCP 71	Stan Levey	Grand Stan	
BCP 72	Herb Jeffries	Say It Isn't So	
BCP 73	Marilyn Moore	Moody	
BCP 74	Sal Salvador	A Tribute to the Greats	
BCP 75	Sam Most	Sam Most Plays Bird, Bud, Monk and Miles	
BCP 76	Jerri Winters	Somebody Loves Me	
BCP 77	Jimmy Knepper	A Swinging Introduction to Jimmy Knepper	
BCP 78	Sam Most	The Amazing Mr. Sam Most	
BCP 79	Tony Ortega	Jazz for Young Moderns	
BCP 80	Frank Rosolino / Russ Garcia / Herbie Harper	Jazz City Presents Bethlehem Jazz Session	
BCP 81	Herbie Nichols	Love, Gloom, Cash, Love	
BCP 82	Various Artists	Bethlehem's Best Volume One	
BCP 83	Various Artists	Bethlehem's Best Volume Two	
BCP 84	Various Artists	Bethlehem's Best Volume Three	
BCP 85	Various Artists	Nothing Cheesy About This Jazz	
BCP 86	Various Artists	We Cut This Album for Bread	
BCP 87	Various Artists	Double Barrel Jazz	
BCP 88	Various Artists	Jazz Music for People Who Don't Care About Money	
BCP 89	Various Artists	We've Built a Jazz Album for You	
BCP 90	Various Artists	A Handful of Cool Jazz	
BCP 91	Various Artists	A Lot of Yarn But a Well Knitted Jazz Album	
BCP 92	Various Artists	No Sour Grapes ...Just Pure Jazz	

=== 5000 series ===
The 5000 series of 12 inch LP records commenced in 1957 but only released six albums.

Catalog	Artist	Album
BCP 5001	Teale Joy	Ted Steele Presents Miss Teal Joy
BCP-5002	Charlie Shavers	The Most Intimate
BCP-5003	Dick Stabile	Dick Stabile Plays for You
BCP-5004	Ted Steele and His Orchestra	Let's Go Dancin'
BCP-5005	Eddie "Cleanhead" Vinson	Clean Head's Back in Town
BCP-5006	Russ Garcia, His Vocal Choir and Orchestra	Sounds in the Night

=== 6000 series ===
The 6000 series of 12 inch LP records commenced in 1956 and ran until 1964.

Catalog	Artist	Album
BCP 6001	Kai Winding and J. J. Johnson	K + J.J.
BCP 6002	The Australian Jazz Quartet	The Australian Jazz Quartet/Quintet
BCP 6003	The Australian Jazz Quartet	The Australian Jazz Quartet
BCP 6004	Chris Connor	Chris Connor Sings Lullabys of Birdland
BCP 6005	Duke Ellington	Duke Ellington Presents...
BCP 6006	Chris Connor / Carmen McRae / Julie London	Bethlehem's Girl Friends
BCP 6007	Pat Moran	The Pat Moran Quartet
BCP 6008	Sam Most	Musically Yours
BCP 6009	Sallie Blair	Squeeze Me
BCP 6010	Audrey Morris	The Voice of Audrey Morris
BCP 6011	Johnny Richards	Something Else by Johnny Richards
BCP 6012	The Australian Jazz Quintet	The Australian Jazz Quintet at the Varsity Drag
BCP 6013	Mel Tormé	Mel Tormé Sings Fred Astaire
BCP 6014	Johnny Hartman	All of Me: The Debonair Mr. Hartman
BCP 6015	The Australian Jazz Quintet	The Australian Jazz Quintet Plus One
BCP 6016	Mel Tormé	Mel Tormé's California Suite
BCP 6017	Frances Faye	Frances Faye Sings Folk Songs
BCP 6018	Pat Moran	While at Birdland
BCP 6019	Charles Mingus	East Coasting
BCP 6020	Mel Tormé	Mel Tormé at the Crescendo
BCP 6021	Charlie Rouse and Paul Quinichette	The Chase Is On
BCP 6022	The Australian Jazz Quintet	Selections of Rodgers and Hammerstein
BCP 6023	Art Blakey's Jazz Messengers	Hard Drive
BCP 6024	Various Artists	Winner's Circle
BCP 6025	John Williams	World on a String
BCP 6026	Charles Mingus	A Modern Jazz Symposium of Music and Poetry
BCP 6027	Art Blakey	Art Blakey Big Band
BCP 6028	Nina Simone	Little Girl Blue
BCP 6029	The Australian Jazz Quintet	The Australian Jazz Quintet in Free Style
BCP 6030	The Australian Jazz Quintet	Modern Jazz Performance of Kurt Weill's Three Penny Opera
BCP 6031	Mel Tormé	Songs for Any Taste
BCP 6032	Teddy Charles and His Sextet	Salute to Hamp
BCP 6033	Frank Minion	The Forward Sound
BCP 6034	Various Artists	Smart, Luscious, Beautiful: Sounds of the Trumpet
BCP 6035	Various Artists	Fifteen Star Saxophones
BCP 6036	Various Artists	Trombone Band Stand
BCP 6037	Various Artists	Big Band Contrast
BCP 6038	Various Artists	Bluesville
BCP 6039	Russ Garcia and Marty Paich	Jazz Music for the Birds and the Hep Cats
BCP 6040	Mel Tormé, Frances Faye and Others	Porgy and Bess: A Jazz Version of Highlights from the Opera
BCP 6041	Nina Simone / Carmen McRae / Chris Connor	Nina Simone and Her Friends
BCP 6042	Jonah Jones and Jack Teagarden	Meet in Dixieland
BCP 6043	Ruby Braff	The Best of Braff
BCP 6044	The Teddy Charles Group	On Campus! Ivy League Jazz Concert
BCP 6045	Mal Waldron	Left Alone
BCP 6046	Charlie Persip	Charlie Persip and the Jazz Statesmen
BCP 6047	Leroy Parkins	Leroy Parkins and Yazoo River Jazz Band
BCP 6048	Booker Ervin	The Book Cooks
BCP 6049	Dave McKenna and Hal Overton	Dual Piano Jazz
BCP 6050	George Wein and the Storyville Sextet	Metronome Presents Jazz at the Modern
BCP 6051	Zoot Sims	Down Home
BCP 6052	Frank Minion	The Soft Land of Make Believe
BCP 6053	John Letman	The Many Angles of John Letman
BCP 6054	Bennie Green	Hornful of Soul
BCP 6055	Howard McGhee	Dusty Blue
BCP 6056	Pepper Adams and Donald Byrd	Motor City Scene
BCP 6057	The Shantymen	A Treasury of Spicy Sea Songs
BCP 6058	Betty Blake	Betty Blake Sings In a Tender Mood
BCP 6059	Harold Ousley	Tenor Sax
BCP 6061	Booker Little	Booker Little and Friend
BCP 6062	Tommy Watt and His Orchestra	Watt's Cooking
BCP 6063	Humphrey Lyttelton	Humph Plays Standards
BCP 6064	Roland Kirk	Third Dimension
BCP 6065	Various Artists	Golden Jazz Instrumentals
BCP 6066	John Coltrane	John Coltrane in the Winners Circle
BCP 6067	Herbie Mann	The Epitome of Jazz
BCP 6068	Various Artists	Jazz Vocals Award Album
BCP 6069	Eddie "Lockjaw" Davis with Shirley Scott at the Organ	The Best of Eddie "Lockjaw" Davis
BCP 6070	The Australian All Stars	Jazz for Beach-Niks
BCP 6071	Various Artists	Blues 'N' Folk
BCP 6072	Milt Buckner	The New World of Milt Buckner
BCP 6073	The Australian All Stars	Jazz for Surf-Niks

== See also ==
- List of record labels
