= Singin' & Swingin' (Betty Roché album) =

Studio album by Betty Roché
- Released: 1960
- Recorded: June 3, 1960
- Studio: Van Gelder Studio, Englewood Cliffs, New Jersey
- Genre: Jazz
- Label: Prestige PRLP 7187

Betty Roché chronology
Take the "A" Train (1956)	Singin' & Swingin' (1960)	Lightly and Politely (1961)

Professional ratings
Review scores
Source	Rating
AllMusic	4/5 stars
The Penguin Guide to Jazz Recordings	3/4 stars

Singin' & Swingin' is a 1960 album by the American jazz singer Betty Roché.

== Reception ==
Scott Yanow reviewed the album for AllMusic and wrote that Roché "should have been much more famous" and that the album was "Recommended, as are all of the other recordings in her slim discography".

== Track listing ==
1. "Come Rain or Come Shine" (Harold Arlen, Johnny Mercer) – 3:48
2. "A Foggy Day" (George Gershwin, Ira Gershwin) – 3:37
3. "Day by Day" (Sammy Cahn, Axel Stordahl, Paul Weston) – 3:55
4. "When I Fall in Love" (Edward Heyman, Victor Young) – 3:18
5. "Blue Moon" (Lorenz Hart, Richard Rodgers) – 3:01
6. "Where or When" (Hart, Rodgers) – 2:56
7. "September Song" (Maxwell Anderson, Kurt Weill) – 2:08
8. "(It Will Have to Do) Until the Real Thing Comes Along" (Sammy Cahn, Saul Chaplin, L. E. Freeman, Mann Holiner, Alberta Nichols) – 4:10
9. "Billie's Bounce" (Charlie Parker) – 3:12

== Personnel ==
- Betty Roché – vocals
- Jimmy Forrest – tenor saxophone
- Jack McDuff – organ
- Bill Jennings – guitar
- Wendell Marshall – double bass
- Roy Haynes – drums
- Dale Wright – liner notes
- Rudy Van Gelder – engineer
- Esmond Edwards – cover art, supervisor
- Phil DeLancie – digital remastering
