= Frank Minion =

American jazz and bop singer

Frank Minion (born January 3, 1929, in Baltimore) is an American jazz and bop singer, with some rhythm and blues and reggae influences. In 1954 he covered "How High the Moon" and "Sweet Lorraine". He later worked with Roland Alexander. In 1960 he released the album The Soft Land of Make Believe on the Bethlehem Records label, accompanied by Bill Evans. Some of his best known recordings include "Introduction to Black Opium Street", "How Much Land (Does A Man Need)", and "Watermelon" (1960). He also did a notable cover of Cole Porter's "Night and Day".
