= Jazz Composers Workshop =

Studio album by Charles Mingus
- Released: April 1956
- Recorded: October 31, 1954 (#1–4, 9–10); January 30, 1955 (#5–8)
- Studio: Van Gelder (Hackensack)
- Genre: Jazz
- Length: 41:25
- Label: Savoy; MG 12059
- Producer: Ozzie Cadena

Charles Mingus chronology
The Jazz Experiments of Charlie Mingus (1955)	Jazz Composers Workshop (1956)	Mingus at the Bohemia (1956)

Jazz Composers Workshop is an album featuring jazz bassist Charles Mingus. It combines the earlier album Moods of Mingus with a Wally Cirillo session released earlier on the album Wally Cirillo & Bobby Scott. It was released on the Savoy label.

== Reception ==
The AllMusic review by Scott Yanow stated: "The complex music on this LP finds bassist Charles Mingus looking toward contemporary classical music in some of the rather cool-toned arrangements. It was not until later in 1955 that he found the right combination of influences in which to express himself best but these slightly earlier performances have their moments".

Professional ratings
Review scores
Source	Rating
AllMusic	2.5/5 stars
The Rolling Stone Jazz Record Guide	4/5 stars

== Track listing ==
All compositions by Charles Mingus, except as indicated

1. "Purple Heart" - 5:36
2. "Gregarian Chant" - 2:51
3. "Eulogy for Rudy Williams" - 6:22
4. "Tea for Two" - 6:19 (Irving Caesar, Vincent Youmans)
5. "Smog L.A." - 3:14 (Wally Cirillo)
6. "Level Seven" - 4:17 (Cirillo)
7. "Transeason" - 4:23 (Cirillo)
8. "Rose Geranium" - 4:13 (Cirillo)
9. "Getting Together" - 4:41
10. "Body and Soul (Alternate Take 1)" - 3:07 On CD reissue

== Personnel ==
- Charles Mingus - bass
- John LaPorta - clarinet (tracks 1, 2, 4, 9 and 10), alto saxophone (track 3)
- Teo Macero - tenor saxophone (tracks 2–10), baritone saxophone (track 1)
- George Barrow - tenor saxophone (track 1), baritone saxophone (tracks 2–4, 9 & 10)
- Wally Cirillo (tracks 5–8), Mal Waldron (tracks 2–4, 9 & 10) - piano
- Kenny Clarke (tracks 5–8), Rudy Nichols (tracks 1–4, 9 & 10) - drums
