= Tell Me... =

Studio album by Jimmy Knepper Sextet
- Released: 1979
- Recorded: August 14, 1979
- Studio: Fendal Soundstudio, Loenen aan de Vecht, Holland
- Genre: Jazz
- Length: 44:17
- Label: Daybreak
- Producer: Fred Dubiez

Jimmy Knepper chronology
Just Friends (1978)	Tell Me... (1979)	Primrose Path (1980)

Tell Me... is an album led by trombonist Jimmy Knepper which was recorded in Holland in 1979 and originally released on the Dutch Daybreak label.

== Reception ==
Professional ratings
Review scores
Source	Rating
Allmusic	4.5/5 stars
The Penguin Guide to Jazz Recordings	3/4 stars

The Allmusic review by Ken Dryden states "Veteran trombonist Jimmy Knepper has led relatively few recording sessions, but this 1979 studio date is well worth acquiring. Knepper brought his own arrangements to the studio for his pickup group of European musicians to play, and all went well throughout the session".

== Track listing ==
All compositions by Jimmy Knepper except where noted.

1. "Tell Me" – 8:17
2. "Brewery Boys Blues" – 6:28
3. "Nearer My God in G" – 8:52
4. "Ecclusiastics" (Charles Mingus) – 9:39
5. "I Thought About You" (Jimmy Van Heusen, Johnny Mercer) – 2:48
6. "Home (When Shadows Fall)" (Harry Clarkson, Geoffrey Clarkson, Peter van Steeden) – 5:29

== Personnel ==
- Jimmy Knepper – trombone
- Eddie Engels – trumpet, flugelhorn
- Dick Vennik – tenor saxophone
- Nico Bunink – piano
- Harry Emmery – bass
- John Engels – drums
