= Live at the Theatre Boulogne-Billancourt/Paris, Vol. 1 =

1988 live album by Mingus Dynasty

Live album by Mingus Dynasty
- Recorded: June 8, 1988
- Venues: Theatre Boulogne-Billancourt, Paris, France
- Genre: Jazz
- Label: Soul Note

Live at the Theatre Boulogne-Billancourt/Paris, Vol. 1 is an album by Mingus Dynasty, billed as Big Band Charlie Mingus.

== Recording and music ==
Live at the Theatre Boulogne-Billancourt/Paris, Vol. 1 was recorded on June 8, 1988. The band was billed as Big Band Charlie Mingus, a larger version of Mingus Dynasty, which plays the music of Charles Mingus. The performances were conducted by Jimmy Knepper.

"Sy Johnson's arrangement of 'The Shoes of the Fishermans Wife Are Some Jive Ass Slippers' [...] builds from opening rubato horns through rocking, tumbling riffs to a solo piano interlude and tenor saxophone (Clifford Jordan and David Murray) solos in 4/4 and 3/4 slowly engulfed by rising ensemble backgrounds."

== Releases ==
The album was released by Soul Note. It was later included, with Live at the Theatre Boulogne-Billancourt/Paris, Vol. 2 and other albums, in the CAM Jazz 4-CD compilation Mingus Dynasty Big Band Charlie Mingus.

== Track listing ==
1. "Jump Monk"
2. "E's Flat Ah's Flat Too"
3. "Duke Ellington's Sound of Love"
4. "The Shoes of the Fisherman's Wife Are Some Jive Ass Slippers"
5. "Ecclusiastics"

== Personnel ==
- Nick Brignola – baritone sax, flute
- Clifford Jordan – tenor sax, soprano sax
- David Murray – tenor sax, bass clarinet
- John Handy – alto sax
- Randy Brecker – trumpet
- Jon Faddis – cornet
- Jimmy Knepper – trombone, conductor
- Mike Zwerin – trombone
- Jaki Byard – piano
- Reggie Johnson – bass
- Billy Hart – drums
