= Randy Van Horne =

American musician (1924–2007)

- Born: Harry Randell Van Horne Jr. February 10, 1924; El Paso, Texas, U.S.
- Died: September 26, 2007 (aged 83); Woodland Hills, Los Angeles, California, U.S.
- Education: Peabody Conservatory of Music; University of Texas at El Paso
- Occupations: Singer, musician
- Years active: 1949–2007
- Children: 1

Harry Randell Van Horne Jr. (February 10, 1924 – September 26, 2007) was an American singer and musician. Van Horne's musical group, the Randy Van Horne Singers, performed the theme songs for many classic Hanna-Barbera cartoons including The Flintstones, Top Cat, The Jetsons and The Huckleberry Hound Show.

== Early life ==
Harry Randell Van Horne Jr. was born on February 10, 1924, in El Paso, Texas. Van Horne dropped out of high school during World War II and enlisted in the United States Army. He returned to school after the war and attended the Peabody Conservatory of Music in Baltimore, Maryland, and the University of Texas at El Paso to study music.

Van Horne married his first wife, Tanya Ingwersen, in the mid-1950s. They had one son, Mark. The marriage ended in divorce. He married and divorced three more times during his life.

== Career ==
Randy Van Horne's career began in the late 1940s as a Los Angeles studio musician. He formed his first musical group, the Encores, in the early 1950s with three other musicians. The Encores broke up in the late 1950s.

He went on to create the Randy Van Horne Singers in the late 1950s following the breakup of the Encores. Several members of the Randy Van Horne Singers would eventually become successful solo recording artists, such as Marni Nixon. The group was known for its easy style of music and remained predominantly a studio musical group. However, the Randy Van Horne Singers did make occasional television performances, such as on The Nat King Cole Show in 1957.

The group recorded the theme songs for several high-profile Hanna-Barbera cartoons, including The Flintstones and The Jetsons. They were hired by Hanna-Barbera's music composer, Hoyt Curtin, to complete the theme songs. However, the group also continued to record for commercials and radio station spots and jingles. Many of the jingles were written by Randy Van Horne.

The Randy Van Horne Singers also recorded several albums including Other Worlds Other Sounds in 1958 with Juan García Esquivel, a Latin musician famous for his "space age pop" style of music, and the winter-themed LP Sleighride (1960, Everest).

The Randy Van Horne Singers officially disbanded in the early 1970s but Van Horne reincarnated the group after 2000, which is led by Alan Wilson as of 2018.

Van Horne continued to perform in clubs in the Los Angeles area. He also worked as the bandleader of a group called the Alumni Association, which was made up of musicians from the Big Band era. Van Horne created a symphonic suite called The Running of the Bulls, which premiered at La Mirada Civic Theatre in 1981.

== Death ==
Randy Van Horne died of cancer at the Motion Picture and Television Country House and Hospital in Woodland Hills, Los Angeles, California, on September 26, 2007, at the age of 83.
