= Stop, Kentucky =

Unincorporated community in Kentucky, United States

Stop
- Unincorporated community
- Location within the state of Kentucky
- Coordinates: 36°48′44″N 84°58′56″W
- Country: United States
- State: Kentucky
- County: Wayne
- Elevation: 1,017 ft (310 m)
- Time zone: UTC-5 (Eastern (EST))
  - Summer (DST): UTC-4 (EDT)
- GNIS feature ID: 2570083

Stop is an unincorporated community located in Wayne County, Kentucky, United States.

The origin of the name "Stop" is obscure.
