= Period Records =

American record label (e. 1949)

- Parent company: Period Music Company
- Founded: 1949
- Founder: William Avar (né Vilmos Avar; 1899–1986)
- Status: Inactive
- Genre: Classical; jazz
- Country of origin: United States
- Location: New York

Period Records was an American record label that was founded in 1949.

== History ==
Period Records was the label of Period Music Company. Period had a large catalog of classical and operetta recordings, as well as jazz and popular music. In 1956, Period sold its jazz LP catalog (10 disks) to Bethlehem Records. Production of all its jazz recordings were supervised by Leonard Feather. Several of the Period recordings had been previously released by Jazztone for mail-order club release. Hungarian-born William Avar (né Vilmos Avar; 1899–1986) was president; Frank Stevens was general manager; Leonard Feather was head of A&R for jazz. In 1950, Period was the American distributor for the French label L'Oiseau Lyre. In 1965, Everest Records acquired Period Records. Period re-issued several European labels, including Swing (fr) and Disques Vogue, as well as American labels, including Dawn. But Period also produced its own original recordings of artists that included Charles Mingus (1954), Jack Teagarden (1954), Ralph Burns (1954, 1955), Osie Johnson (1955), Maxine Sullivan (1955), Sonny Rollins (1957), Charlie Shavers (1957), Thad Jones (1957), Luckey Roberts (1958), and Danny Barker (1958).
