= Stop (Rogatica) =

Stop Стоп
- Village
- Location within Bosnia and Herzegovina
- Coordinates: 43°57′24″N 19°7′26″E
- Country: Bosnia and Herzegovina
- Entity: Republika Srpska
- Municipality: Rogatica

Population (1991)
  - Total: 73
- Time zone: UTC+1 (CET)
  - Summer (DST): UTC+2 (CEST)

Stop (Serbian Cyrillic: Стоп) is a village in the municipality of Rogatica, Republika Srpska, Bosnia and Herzegovina.
