= Halt =

Halt may refer to:

- Halt (railway), a small railway station
- HLT (x86 instruction), a.k.a. "HALT"
- Highly accelerated life test, a product stress testing methodology
- The Halt, a 2019 film
- Charles I. Halt (born 1939), United States Air Force colonel who had an encounter with UFOs
- Karl Ritter von Halt, born Karl Ferdinand Halt (1891–1964), sport official in Nazi Germany and in the German Federal Republic
- Halt (album), 2025 album by Foetus

== See also ==
- Stop (disambiguation)
