= John LaPorta =

John LaPorte
- Born: John Daniel LaPorta; April 13, 1920; Philadelphia, Pennsylvania, U.S.
- Died: May 12, 2004 (aged 84) Sarasota, Florida, U.S.
- Genres: Jazz
- Instrument: Clarinet

John Daniel LaPorta (April 13, 1920 – May 12, 2004) was a jazz clarinetist and composer.

== Early life and education ==
A native of Philadelphia, LaPorta started playing clarinet at the age of nine and studied at the Mastbaum School in Philadelphia, where one of his classmates was Buddy DeFranco. As a teenager he played in Philadelphia bands with Charlie Ventura and Bill Harris. He studied classically with Joseph Gigliotti of the Philadelphia Orchestra and Leon Russianoff at the Manhattan School of Music.

== Career ==
From 1942 to 1944, he was a member of the Bob Chester big band, then spent the next two years with the Woody Herman Orchestra. Beginning in 1947, he studied with Lennie Tristano. With Teo Macero and Charles Mingus he was a member of the Jazz Composers Workshop, trying to combine jazz with classical music. In the classical world, he worked with Boston Pops, Leonard Bernstein, Leopold Stokowski, and Igor Stravinsky. In jazz he worked with Kenny Clarke, Miles Davis, Dizzy Gillespie, Charlie Parker, Buddy Rich, and Lester Young.

On August 12, 1956, La Porta was invited to the first jazz concert in Venezuela at Caracas National Theater, where he was backed by the Casablanca Orchestra, Charlie Nagy, Werner Boehm, Walter Albrecht, among others. During his stay in Caracas a selection of the repertoire performed at the concert was released under the title South American Brothers by Fantasy Records, the first jazz recording in Venezuela.

He taught at Parkway Music School, then at public schools on Long Island, followed by the Manhattan School of Music and the Berklee College of Music. With guitarist Jack Petersen, he pioneered the use of Greek modes for teaching chord-scales.

== Personal life ==
In the 1990s, he and his wife retired to Sarasota, Florida, where he performed at the Sarasota Jazz Club and as a guest with the Fred Williams Trio. He wrote his autobiography, Playing It by Ear. LaPorta died from complications of a stroke on May 12, 2004, in Sarasota.

== Discography ==
- The John LaPorta Quintet (Debut, 1954)
- Three Moods (Debut, 1955)
- South American Brothers (Fantasy, 1956)
- Conceptions (Debut, 1956)
- The Clarinet Artistry of John LaPorta (Debut, 1957)
- The Most Minor (Everest, 1959)
- Theme and Variations (Fantasy, 2002)

With Kenny Clarke

- Klook's Clique (Savoy, 1956)

With Charles Mingus

- The Jazz Experiments of Charlie Mingus (Bethlehem, 1956)
- Jazz Composers Workshop (Savoy, 1956)
