= Betty Roché =

American jazz and blues singer (1918–1999)

- Roché in April 1943

Background information
- Born: Mary Elizabeth Roach; January 9, 1918; Wilmington, Delaware, U.S.
- Died: February 16, 1999 (aged 81) Pleasantville, New Jersey, U.S.
- Genres: Jazz; blues
- Occupation: Singer
- Years active: 1939–1960s
- Labels: Bethlehem; Prestige
- Member of: Savoy Sultans; Duke Ellington; Earl Hines

Mary Elizabeth Roché (née Roach; January 9, 1918 – February 16, 1999) was an American blues and jazz singer. Though she had a sporadic career, she became best known for her version of "Take the 'A' Train" with Duke Ellington's orchestra, and, according to AllMusic, "was famous for her strong, dramatic way of putting across blues material".

== Biography ==
Roché was born in Wilmington, Delaware, as Mary Elizabeth Roach, and was raised by her grandparents in Atlantic City, New Jersey. She won a talent contest at the Apollo Theater after settling in New York City in 1939, and then sang with the Savoy Sultans in 1941. She made her first recording with them, but the band broke up shortly after she joined. The following year, she joined the Duke Ellington orchestra in succession to Ivie Anderson, appearing in the film Reveille with Beverly (1944), which also featured Frank Sinatra and Count Basie. She performed a vocal version of "Take the 'A' Train" in the film, but the AFM recording ban (1942–1944) meant that she could not make a recording of it at the time. She also sang in Ellington's performance of his "Black, Brown and Beige" suite at Carnegie Hall, but again, no recordings were made at the time, and by the time Ellington was able to record it in 1944, Roché had left the band.

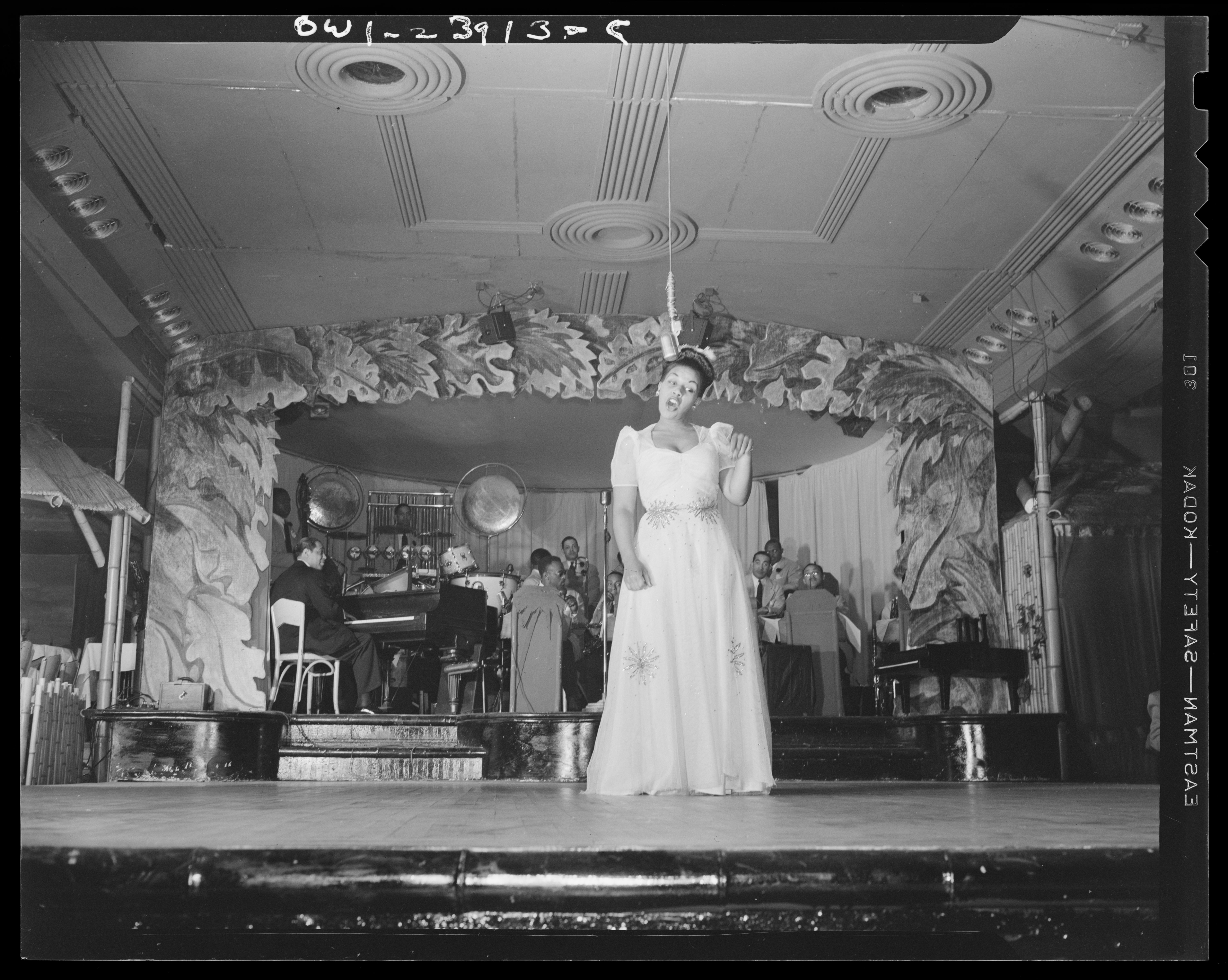
Roché singing "Salt Lake City Blues" with Duke Ellington and his orchestra at the Hurricane Ballroom, New York City, April 1943

She also sang with Lester Young and Hot Lips Page and, in the 1940s, performed at Minton's Playhouse with bebop musicians including Thelonious Monk and Kenny Clarke. She joined the Earl Hines band in 1944 and recorded with him before leaving the music business for a few years. In 1951, she rejoined Ellington and, the following year, finally recorded an extended version of "Take the 'A' Train" on the LP Ellington Uptown. She left Ellington again in 1954. Settling in San Diego, California, she worked occasionally in clubs and with Charles Brown and Clark Terry. In the mid-1950s, she was part of the cast recording of The Complete Porgy and Bess. She recorded three albums as leader, Take the "A" Train (Bethlehem, 1956), Singin' & Swingin', and Lightly and Politely (Prestige, 1960 and 1961, respectively), but was unwilling to maintain a full-time career in music.

Roché died in Pleasantville, New Jersey, on February 16, 1999, aged 81.

== Discography ==
- Take the "A" Train (Bethlehem, 1956)
- Singin' & Swingin' (Prestige, 1960)
- Lightly and Politely (Prestige, 1961)
