= Hep Records =

Scottish record label

- Founded: 1974; 51 years ago
- Founder: Alastair Robertson
- Distributor(s): Allegro Music Group
- Genre: Jazz
- Country of origin: Scotland
- Location: Edinburgh
- Official website: www.hepjazz.com

Hep Records is a jazz record company and label founded by Alastair Robertson (born March 3, 1941, in Aberdeen, Scotland) in Edinburgh, Scotland, in 1974.

== History ==
Hep started as a reissue label for material from radio transcription discs, mainly big band music from the 1940s. Other reissue material includes Fletcher Henderson, Andy Kirk, Jimmie Lunceford, Don Redman and Sam Donahue. When it began to issue new recordings, it added Buddy DeFranco, Don Lanphere, and Eddie Thompson. Other musicians on the catalogue include Slim Gaillard, Boyd Raeburn, Spike Robinson, Slam Stewart, Joe Temperley, and Jessica Williams.
