= Music of Kids on the Slope =

Kids on the Slope discography
- Soundtrack albums: 3
- Compilation albums: 1
- Singles: 2

The manga series Kids on the Slope (Japanese: 坂道のアポロン, Hepburn: Sakamichi no Aporon; lit. "Apollo on the Slope") and its anime and live-action film adaptations have had various soundtracks and compilations released around them. The music for the series draws from jazz music of the early- to mid-20th century, and prominently features American jazz artists such as Art Blakey and Bill Evans.

The soundtrack for the anime series is composed primarily by Yoko Kanno, who won Best Music at the Tokyo Anime Awards for her work on Kids on the Slope in 2013. The anime series uses two pieces of theme music: its opening theme "Sakamichi no Melody" is performed by Yuki, while its closing theme "Altair" is written and performed by Motohiro Hata.

== Compilation albums ==
=== Kids on the Slope Original Soundtrack (2009) ===
In 2009, EMI Music Japan published Kids on the Slope Original Soundtrack, a compilation album collecting songs referenced in the manga series. The album is composed of a combination of licensed original recordings, and cover versions by the Japanese jazz quartet Quasimode. The album peaked at 261 on the Oricon sales charts.

Track list
No.	Title	Music	Performed by	Length
1.	"Moanin'"	Bobby Timmons	Art Blakey & The Jazz Messengers	9:35
2.	"Blowin' the Blues Away"	Horace Silver	Horace Silver	4:43
3.	"Someday My Prince Will Come"	Frank Churchill	Quasimode	3:24
4.	"A Night in Tunisia"	Dizzy Gillespie	Art Blakey & The Jazz Messengers	9:39
5.	"But Not for Me"	Ira Gershwin & George Gershwin	Chet Baker	3:04
6.	"Us Three"	Horace Parlan	Horace Parlan	4:34
7.	"Love for Sale"	Cole Porter	Cannonball Adderley	7:04
8.	"Easy to Love"	Cole Porter	Sarah Vaughan	2:11
9.	"My Favorite Things"	Richard Rodgers & Oscar Hammerstein II	Quasimode	4:30
10.	"Bags' Groove"	Milt Jackson	Milt Jackson	3:08
11.	"Blue Train"	John Coltrane	John Coltrane	10:41
12.	"My Funny Valentine"	Richard Rodgers	Bill Evans & Jim Hall	5:21
Total length:				67:54

== Singles ==
=== "Sakamichi no Melody" ===
"Sakamichi no Melody" by Yuki is the theme song used in the anime adaptation of the series. The song is composed and arranged by Yoko Kanno, and written by Yuki. The song was released as the B-side to her single "Playball" on May 2, 2012, and peaked at 4 on the Billboard Japan Hot 100 and 3 on the Oricon sales charts, where it remained for 11 weeks.

=== "Altair" ===
"Altair" by Motohiro Hata is the closing theme for the anime adaptation of the series. The song peaked at 17 on the Oricon sales charts, and remained on the chart for 5 weeks.

== Soundtrack albums ==
=== Kids on the Slope Original Soundtrack (2012) ===
In 2012, Epic Records Japan published Kids on the Slope Original Soundtrack, which collects songs used in the anime adaption of the series and Yoko Kanno's original score. The album peaked at 39 on the Oricon sales charts, and remained on the chart for 16 weeks.

Track list
No.	Title	Music	Original artist	Length
1.	"Kids on the Slope"	Yoko Kanno	–	2:28
2.	"Chick's Dinner"	Yoko Kanno	–	2:01
3.	"Moanin'"	Takashi Matsunaga	Bobby Timmons & Art Blakey	4:42
4.	"Bags' Groove"	Yoko Kanno	Milt Jackson	2:29
5.	"Blowin' the Blues Away"	Yoko Kanno	Horace Silver	1:26
6.	"Satin Doll"	Yoko Kanno	Duke Ellington, Billy Strayhorn & Johnny Mercer	1:08
7.	"Yurika"	Yoko Kanno	–	2:35
8.	"Rosario"	Yoko Kanno	–	2:17
9.	"Curandelo"	Yoko Kanno	–	1:40
10.	"Transparent"	Yoko Kanno	–	1:37
11.	"run"	Mabanua	–	1:33
12.	"But Not for Me"	Yoko Kanno	Ira Gershwin & George Gershwin	4:30
13.	"My Favorite Things"	Yoko Kanno	Richard Rodgers & Oscar Hammerstein II	3:20
14.	"Equinox"	Yoko Kanno	–	2:40
15.	"A Piece of Blue"	Yoko Kanno	–	1:27
16.	"Lullaby of Birdland"	Aoi Teshima	George Shearing & George David Weiss	3:05
17.	"Jazz for Button"	Yoko Kanno	–	1:19
18.	"Four"	Yoko Kanno	Miles Davis	1:38
19.	"Easy Waltz"	Takashi Matsunaga	–	2:04
20.	"float"	Mabanua	–	1:25
21.	"Milestones"	Yoko Kanno	Miles Davis	2:43
22.	"Apollon Blue"	Yoko Kanno	–	2:43
23.	"Kaoru & Sentaro Duo in Bunkasai"	Yoko Kanno	Various (Note: Medley of "My Favorite Things", "Someday My Prince Will Come", and "Moanin".)	3:38
24.	"Someday My Prince Will Come"	Takashi Matsunaga	Frank Churchill	1:42
Total length:				56:10

=== Kids on the Slope Original Soundtrack: Plus More & Rare ===
Kids on the Slope Original Soundtrack: Plus More & Rare, a supplement to Kids on the Slope Original Soundtrack (2012) featuring additional and rearranged music from the anime series, was also published by Epic Records Japan in 2012. The album peaked at 49 on the Oricon sales charts.

Track list
No.	Title	Music	Original artist	Length
1.	"Angel and Rosary"	Yoko Kanno	–	0:26
2.	"Sentaro Drum Solo"	Shun Ishiwaka	–	0:37
3.	"Moanin' Copy (Mono Mix)"	Youichi Takeda	Bobby Timmons	1:33
4.	"But Not for Me (festival jazz version)"	Takashi Matsunaga, Shun Ishiwaka, Yoko Kanno	Ira Gershwin & George Gershwin	0:26
5.	"Slasher than Bop"	Yoko Kanno	–	1:02
6.	"Raindrops Keep Swingin' on My Head"	Yoko Kanno	–	1:13
7.	"Skip"	Yoko Kanno	–	1:38
8.	"Button2"	Yoko Kanno	–	0:09
9.	"Memory"	Takashi Matsunaga	–	1:23
10.	"Hey Boy"	Hiroto Sasaki, Hiroshi Kamayatsu, Yoko Kanno	–	1:34
11.	"Bang Bang Bang"	Hiroshi Kamayatsu, Yoko Kanno	–	2:38
12.	"Grande valse brillante"	Takashi Matsunaga	Frederic Francois Chopin	0:52
13.	"Slope"	Yoko Kanno	–	1:24
14.	"Piano2"	Mabanua	–	0:14
15.	"nichijo3"	Mabanua	–	1:04
16.	"Moanin' Organ Version (Kaoru & Sentaro Duo)"	Takashi Matsunaga, Shun Ishiwaka	Bobby Timmons	1:19
17.	"kumori"	Yoko Kanno	–	2:18
18.	"Days of Egg"	Yoko Kanno	–	0:53
19.	"nichijo0"	Mabanua	–	1:40
20.	"Smokey4"	Yoko Kanno	–	1:26
21.	"Button5"	Yoko Kanno	–	0:08
22.	"Blue Egg"	Yoko Kanno	–	0:42
23.	"Yurika (DJ Mitsu the Beats re-arrange version)"	Yoko Kanno, DJ Mitsu The Beats, Takumi Kaneko	–	3:26
24.	"Without a Word"	Yoko Kanno	–	0:53
25.	"Ritsuko's rit."	Yoko Kanno	–	0:52
26.	"Kira Kira Road"	Takashi Matsunaga, Youichi Takeda	–	2:03
27.	"Honey Mustard Waltz"	Yoko Kanno	–	2:39
28.	"Piano1"	Mabanua	–	0:11
29.	"Lullaby of Birdland (sax intro version)"	Yoko Kanno	George Shearing & George David Weiss	3:04
30.	"Flutter Jam"	Yoko Kanno	–	1:21
31.	"Conflict"	Yoko Kanno	–	0:58
32.	"Baka Session"	Takashi Matsunaga, Shun Ishiwaka	–	0:32
33.	"hope"	Mabanua	–	2:39
34.	"dew"	DJ Mitsu The Beats, Takumi Kaneko	–	1:17
35.	"Someday My Prince Will Come (full version)"	Takashi Matsunaga, Yoko Kanno	–	3:13
36.	"Moanin' Ending version (Kaoru & Sentaro Duo)"	Takashi Matsunaga, Yasuo Sano, Yoko Kanno	Bobby Timmons	3:04
Total length:				52:18

=== Kids on the Slope Soundtrack & Jazz Music Collection ===
In 2018, Ariola Japan published Kids on the Slope Soundtrack & Jazz Music Collection, which collects the soundtrack of the live-action film adaptation of the series. The album peaked at 161 on the Oricon sales charts.

All songs are composed by Masato Suzuki of the band Little Creatures.

Track list
No.	Title	Original artist	Length
1.	"Beginning"	–	2:28
2.	"Moanin'"	Bobby Timmons & Art Blakey	1:23
3.	"Rampage Rain"	–	0:58
4.	"Wild and Bright"	–	0:45
5.	"Pavane pour une infante défunte"	Maurice Ravel	0:40
6.	"Day-to-Day"	–	1:14
7.	"Sentaro's Drum"	–	0:32
8.	"Get You Back"	–	0:52
9.	"Fat Girl"	Fats Navarro	2:01
10.	"Day-to-Day 'Summer'"	–	0:51
11.	"Our Youthful Days"	–	1:38
12.	"Beautiful Woman"	–	0:43
13.	"Lovesickness"	–	1:03
14.	"Envious"	–	0:23
15.	"Follow Your Heart"	–	1:01
16.	"Love Cry"	–	0:58
17.	"Sadness"	–	2:08
18.	"About Him"	–	1:44
19.	"I'm Sorry"	–	1:48
20.	"Emptiness"	–	0:49
21.	"Chasm"	–	1:42
22.	"Grow Apart"	–	0:42
23.	"The Pain"	–	1:16
24.	"Apollon Special Medley"	–	4:33
25.	"Theme of Apollon"	–	1:27
26.	"Someday My Prince Will Come"	Frank Churchill	0:46
27.	"Someday My Prince Will Come (With Hope)"	Frank Churchill	0:48
28.	"Unconscious"	–	0:48
29.	"About Him "tears""	–	2:46
30.	"Sadness "Rosary""	–	1:22
31.	"Good Old Days"	–	1:39
32.	"My Favorite Things"	Richard Rodgers & Oscar Hammerstein II	1:43
Total length:			41:24
