= List of Kids on the Slope episodes =

Kids on the Slope (Japanese: 坂道のアポロン, Hepburn: Sakamichi no Aporon; lit. "Apollo on the Slope") is a 2012 anime series adapted from the manga of the same name by Yuki Kodama. It is directed by Shinichirō Watanabe, with music by Yoko Kanno; it is the third collaboration between Watanabe and Kanno, following Macross Plus (1994–1995) and Cowboy Bebop (1998). The series follows Kaoru Nishimi, an intelligent, introverted first-year high school student from a wealthy family who moves cities frequently as a result of his father's career. He has consequently never made lasting friendships, but discovers jazz music after meeting classmates Sentarō Kawabuchi and Ritsuko Mukae.

The series was produced by MAPPA and Tezuka Productions, and aired on Fuji TV's Noitamina programming block. In North America, Kids on the Slope was licensed by Sentai Filmworks and aired on the streaming service Crunchyroll, which simulcast the series during its original broadcast run.

== Episodes ==
No.	Title	Directed by	Written by	Original release date
1	"Moanin'"; Transliteration: "Mōnin" (Japanese: モーニン)	Kotomi Deai	Ayako Katō	April 12, 2012
In the summer of 1966, Kaoru Nishimi moves to his uncle's home in Sasebo, Nagasaki. While attending the local high school he meets class representative Ritsuko Mukae and Sentarō Kawabuchi, a gruff delinquent. After asking Ritsuko where he can purchase records, Ritsuko invites him to her family's record store. In the store's rehearsal space he encounters Sentarō, who demonstrates intense jazz drumming. Kaoru attempts to follow him on the piano, but is admonished by Sentarō for his stiff playing style. Kaoru purchases the record for the song Sentarō performed – "Moanin'" by Art Blakey.
2	"Summertime"; Transliteration: "Samātaimu" (Japanese: サマータイム)	Hisatoshi Shimizu	Yūko Kakihara	April 19, 2012
Kaoru begins teaching himself to play jazz. At Ritsuko's behest, Sentarō intervenes to protect Kaoru from a group of bullies. At the record store, Kaoru is introduced to Junichi Katsuragi, a friend to the Mukae and Kawabuchi families. Kaoru asks Ritsuko to study with him, but they are joined by Sentarō, to Kaoru's displeasure. The group travels to a beach, where Sentarō intervenes to assist Yurika Fukahori, a girl who is being harassed by a group of men; he promptly falls in love at first sight with her.
3	"Someday My Prince Will Come"; Transliteration: "Itsuka ōji-sama ga" (Japanese: いつか王子様が)	Shizutaka Sugahara	Ayako Katō	April 26, 2012
With assistance from Kaoru, Sentarō asks Yurika out. They are joined by Kaoru and Ritsuko on a double date, though the outing prompts Kaoru to realize that Ritsuko has feelings for Sentarō. Kaoru and Sentarō fight after Sentarō shows off a handkerchief Yurika gifted him in front of Ritsuko, but they reconcile over a duet of Chet Baker's cover of "But Not For Me". Later, Kaoru walks in on Yurika and a nude Sentarō, and assumes they have escalated their relationship. Kaoru plays Bill Evans' cover of "Someday My Prince Will Come" for Ritsuko, and confesses his feelings for her.
4	"But Not for Me"; Transliteration: "Batto notto fō mī" (Japanese: バット・ノット・フォー・ミー)	Sayo Aoi	Yūko Kakihara	May 3, 2012
Sentarō explains that he was posing for a painting when Kaoru walked in on him. While purchasing a birthday present for Sentarō, Kaoru impulsively kisses Ritsuko, and she runs away crying. Kaoru sees Sentarō with his siblings shortly thereafter, and lashes out in jealously at what he perceives as a loving family. Sentarō explains that he is of mixed Japanese-American descent, and was shunned by his schoolmates and family as a child. At Christmas, Junichi, Kaoru, Sentarō, and Ritsuko's father Tsutomu play a "Blowin' the Blues Away" by Horace Silver at a local bar. After the performance, Junichi and Yurika shyly introduce themselves to each other.
5	"Lullabys of Birdland"; Transliteration: "Bādorando no komori-uta" (Japanese: バードランドの子守唄)	Minoru Yamaoka	Ayako Katō	May 10, 2012
Unable to face Ritsuko after kissing her, Kaoru stops practicing jazz at the record store. Kaoru's father returns, and gives him a letter containing his mother's address in Tokyo. He travels to visit her, and is joined unexpectedly on the trip by Sentarō. They visit Junichi's dormitory while in the city, but are told that he has not been seen for over a month. Kaoru gifts his mother a copy of "Lullaby of Birdland" by Chris Connor before departing for Kyushu; upon returning, he begins playing jazz at the record store again.
6	"You Don't Know What Love Is"; Transliteration: "Yū donto nō howatto rabu Izu" (Japanese: ユー･ドント・ノウ・ホワット・ラブ・イズ)	Jun Shishido	Yūko Kakihara	May 17, 2012
As the second year of high school begins, Yurika continues to work on her painting, which depicts Sentarō as Apollo. Seiji Matsuoka, a student in the art club with Yurika, tells Sentarō about his dream of becoming a famous musician so he can support his family; he asks Sentarō to join his band and play at the school festival, and Sentarō agrees. The incident prompts Kaoru to recall his memories of abandonment, and he lashes out at Sentarō.
7	"Now's the Time"; Transliteration: "Nauzu za taimu" (Japanese: ナウズ・ザ・タイム)	Kotomi Deai	Ayako Katō	May 24, 2012
Kaoru and Sentarō remain distant. Junichi re-emerges in Kyushu, having suffered an unspecified trauma. Seiji's band performs at the school festival, but the amplifiers for their electric instruments stop working mid-performance. While searching for the cause of the problem, Kaoru overhears Sentarō saying that he only joined the band to help Seiji support his family. Kaoru plays the piano to keep the audience from leaving, and Sentarō joins in on the drums. They play a medley of jazz songs, drawing in a large audience from all over the school.
8	"These Foolish Things"; Transliteration: "Jīzu fūrisshu shingusu" (Japanese: ジーズ・フーリッシュ・シングス)	Hisatoshi Shimizu	Yūko Kakihara	May 31, 2012
A flashback reveals that Junichi became involved in the Zenkyoto student movement in Tokyo; he dropped out of school after his comrade was arrested and badly injured in a protest, and was subsequently disowned by his parents. Sentarō goes to visit Junichi, and discovers Yurika at his apartment. When Sentarō recounts the incident to Kaoru, Kaoru scolds him for not being aware that there was already someone in love with him. He soon realizes that Kaoru was referring to Ritsuko.
9	"Love Me or Leave Me"; Transliteration: "Rabu mī oa rību mī" (Japanese: ラブ・ミー・オア・リーブ・ミー)	Yui Umemoto	Ayako Katō	June 7, 2012
Sentarō apologizes to Ritsuko for not being aware of her feelings for him, though Ritsuko concedes that she is no longer attracted to him romantically. Junichi accepts an invitation from his comrades in Tokyo to start a publishing company together. As he boards a train to depart Kyushu, Yurika asks to join him, and he refuses. Yurika's parents arrive at the station, angry at her for abandoning a matchmaking meeting they arranged for her; Junichi pulls her aboard the departing train with him at the last moment. At the record shop, Kaoru opens the piano fallboard and finds a pair of gloves Ritsuko knitted for him.
10	"In a Sentimental Mood"; Transliteration: "In a senchimentaru mūdo" (Japanese: イン・ア・センチメンタル・ムード)	Minoru Yamaoka	Yūko Kakihara	June 14, 2012
Kaoru receives a pair of knitted gloves from Ritsuko, but fearing rejection, does not pursue her. When Ritsuko presses him on his feelings, Kaoru affirms his love for her. Some time later, Kaoru and Sentarō are challenged by Seiji to perform at the upcoming school festival. However, upon learning that his adopted father is returning home from his job in another prefecture, Sentarō decides to run away from home.
11	"Left Alone"; Transliteration: "Refuto arōn" (Japanese: レフト・アローン)	Kotomi Deai	Ayako Katō	June 21, 2012
Kaoru intervenes to stop Sentarō from leaving home. Tsutomu and Ritsuko join Kaoru and Sentarō as bassist and vocalist for the festival group, but the night before the festival, Sentarō is involved in a car accident while riding his scooter. Sentarō suffers minor injuries but his younger sister Sachiko, who was riding with him, is seriously injured. Kaoru comforts Sentarō on the roof of the hospital; Sachiko wakes up shortly thereafter, though Sentarō has vanished. Kaoru tries to comfort Ritsuko, but realizes that Sentarō will never return.
12	"All Blues"; Transliteration: "Ōru burūsu" (Japanese: オール・ブルース)	Shinichirō Watanabe	Yūko Kakihara	June 28, 2012
Sentarō remains missing as Kaoru and Ritsuko graduate high school. Ritsuko rejects Kaoru after he comments that Sentarō's disappearance means they can be together; he apologizes, and reveals that he is moving to attend university in Tokyo. As he leaves Kyushu, he sees Ritsuko running alongside his departing train, and they exchange one last glance. Eight years later, Kaoru works as a resident physician. He encounters Yurika, now pregnant with Junichi's child, and she shows him a photograph of a friend's wedding that depicts Sentarō. Kaoru travels to the church in the photo, where he learns Sentarō works as a priest-in-training. He plays "Moanin'" on the church organ, and is joined by Sentarō on drums in a jazz session. Reunited, they run down the slope to the church together; near the bottom they reunite with Ritsuko, who is holding a letter from Yurika about Sentarō's whereabouts.
