= Quasimode =

Quasimode may mean:

- a mode in user interfaces that is kept in place only through some constant action on the part of the user
- Quasimode (band), a Japanese jazz band
