= Wolf's Daughter: A Werewolf's Tale =

Japanese manga series

- First tankōbon volume cover

狼の娘 (Ōkami no Musume)
- Genre: Coming-of-age; Romance; Supernatural
- Manga
- Written by: Yuki Kodama
- Published by: Shogakukan
- English publisher: NA: Seven Seas Entertainment
- Imprint: Flower Comics α
- Magazine: Monthly Flowers
- Original run: August 26, 2022 – present
- Volumes: 9

Wolf's Daughter: A Werewolf's Tale (狼の娘, Ōkami no Musume) is a Japanese manga series written and illustrated by Yuki Kodama. It began serialization in Shogakukan's josei manga magazine Monthly Flowers in August 2022.

== Plot ==
After an encounter with a mysterious man named Hayate, Tsukina comes to the realization that she's not fully human, and that her traits like her night vision, athleticism, and cravings for raw meat are all traits associated with werewolves. This revelation leads to Tsukina looking for answers about herself and werewolves.

== Publication ==
Written and illustrated by Yuki Kodama, Wolf's Daughter: A Werewolf's Tale began serialization in Shogakukan's josei manga magazine Monthly Flowers on August 26, 2022. Its chapters have been collected into nine tankōbon volumes as of October 2026.

In October 2024, Seven Seas Entertainment announced that they had licensed the series for English publication beginning in June 2025.

No.	Original release date	Original ISBN	North American release date	North American ISBN
1	March 9, 2023	978-4-09-872034-7	June 24, 2025	979-8-89373-440-9
Chapters 1–5
2	September 8, 2023	978-4-09-872215-0	November 11, 2025	979-8-89373-773-8
Chapters 5–10; Bonus: "In Search of Wolves"
3	February 8, 2024	978-4-09-872496-3	April 14, 2026	979-8-89373-774-5
Chapters 11–15
4	July 10, 2024	978-4-09-872673-8	September 15, 2026	979-8-89561-547-8
Chapters 16–20
5	December 10, 2024	978-4-09-872815-2	February 16, 2027	979-8-89561-548-5
6	May 9, 2025	978-4-09-873066-7	—	—
7	October 9, 2025	978-4-09-873198-5	—	—
8	April 10, 2026	978-4-09-873413-9	—	—
9	October 8, 2026	978-4-09-873580-8	—	—

== Reception ==
The series was ranked eighth in the 2024 edition of Takarajimasha's Kono Manga ga Sugoi! guidebook's list of the best manga for female readers. The series won the Booksellers Award at the 2025 EbookJapan Manga Awards.
