= Tadd Dameron =

American jazz composer and pianist (1917–1965)

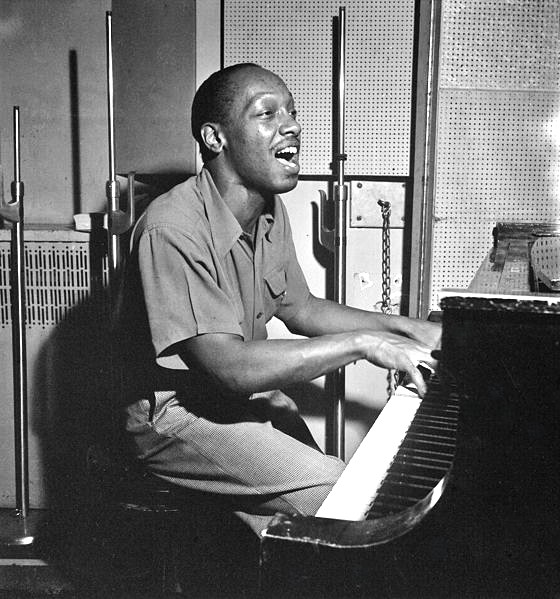
- Dameron, New York, between 1946 and 1948; Photograph by William P. Gottlieb.

Background information
- Born: Tadley Ewing Peake Dameron; February 21, 1917; Cleveland, Ohio, U.S.
- Died: March 8, 1965 (aged 48) New York City, U.S.
- Genre: Jazz
- Occupations: Musician, composer, arranger
- Instrument: Piano
- Years active: 1940s–1960s

Tadley Ewing Peake Dameron (February 21, 1917 – March 8, 1965) was an American jazz composer, arranger, and pianist.

== Biography ==
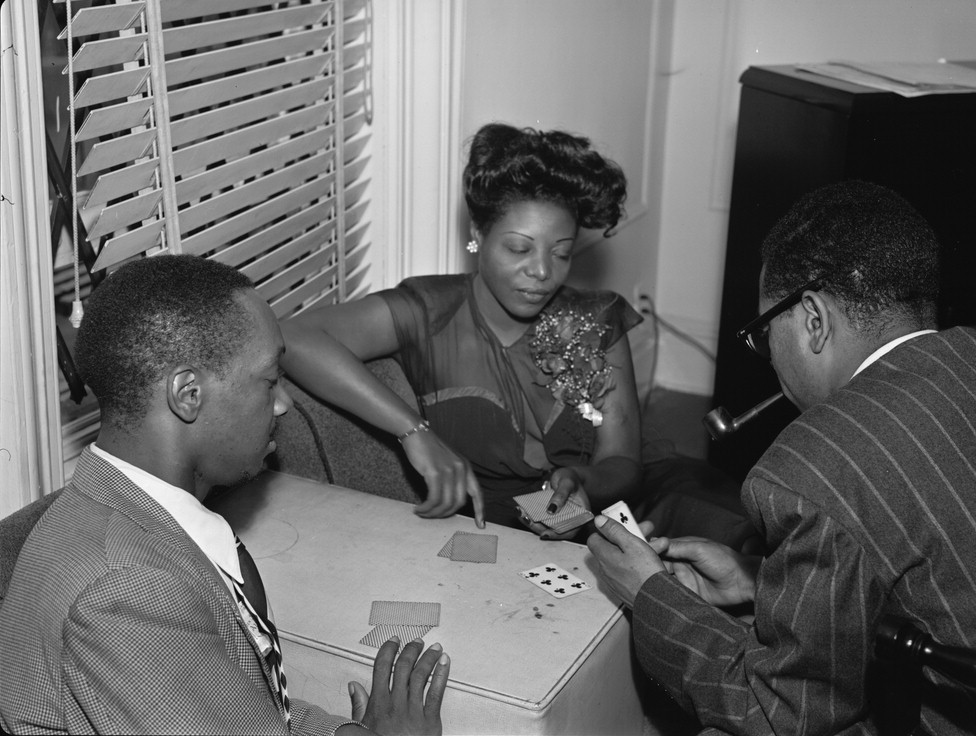
Dameron, Mary Lou Williams, and Dizzy Gillespie in Williams's apartment, c. June 1946 Photograph by William P. Gottlieb.

Born in Cleveland, Ohio, United States, Dameron was the most influential arranger of the bebop era, but also wrote charts for swing and hard bop players. The bands he arranged for included those of Count Basie, Artie Shaw, Jimmie Lunceford, Dizzy Gillespie, Billy Eckstine, and Sarah Vaughan. In 1940–41, Dameron was the piano player and arranger for the Kansas City band Harlan Leonard and his Rockets. He and lyricist Carl Sigman wrote "If You Could See Me Now" for Sarah Vaughan and it became one of her first signature songs. According to the composer, his greatest influences were George Gershwin and Duke Ellington.

In the late 1940s, Dameron wrote arrangements for the big band of Dizzy Gillespie, who gave the première of his large-scale orchestral piece Soulphony in Three Hearts at Carnegie Hall in 1948. Also in 1948, Dameron led his own group in New York, which included Fats Navarro; the following year, Dameron was at the Paris Jazz Festival with Miles Davis. From 1961, Dameron scored for recordings by Milt Jackson, Sonny Stitt, and Blue Mitchell.

Dameron additionally arranged and played for rhythm and blues musician Bull Moose Jackson. Playing for Jackson at that same time was Benny Golson, who went on to become a jazz composer in his own right. Golson said that Dameron was the most important influence on his writing.

Dameron composed several bop and swing standards, including "Hot House", "If You Could See Me Now", "Our Delight", "Good Bait" (composed for Count Basie) and "Lady Bird". Dameron's bands from the late 1940s and early 1950s featured leading players such as Fats Navarro, Miles Davis, Dexter Gordon, Sonny Rollins, Wardell Gray, and Clifford Brown. In 1956, Dameron led two sessions based on his compositions, released as the 1956 album Fontainebleau and the 1957 album Mating Call, the latter featuring John Coltrane.

Dameron developed an addiction to narcotics toward the end of his career. He was arrested on drug charges in 1957 and 1958, and served time (1959–60) in a federal prison hospital in Lexington, Kentucky. After his release, Dameron recorded a single notable project as a leader, The Magic Touch (1962), but was sidelined by health problems; he had several heart attacks before dying of cancer in 1965, at the age of 48. He was buried at Ferncliff Cemetery in Hartsdale, New York.

== Tributes ==
- In the 1980s, drummer Philly Joe Jones and trumpeter Don Sickler founded Dameronia, a band that performed the music of Tadd Dameron.
- Saxophonist Dexter Gordon called Dameron the "romanticist" of the bop movement.
- Music critic Scott Yanow called Dameron the "definitive arranger/composer of the bop era".
- Saxophonist Joe Lovano included five Dameron tunes on his 2000 album 52nd Street Themes.
- In 2006, trumpeter Peter Welker released Duke, Billy and Tadd as a tribute to Duke Ellington, Billy Strayhorn, and Dameron.
- Turkish drummer Ferit Odman released Dameronia with Strings, an album featuring eight Dameron tunes, in 2015.
- Trumpeter Joe Magnarelli's 2019 album If You Could See Me Now is a tribute to Dameron.
- In 2019, singer Vanessa Rubin released an album titled The Dream Is You: Vanessa Rubin Sings Tadd Dameron.

== Discography ==
=== As leader/co-leader ===
Recorded	Released	Title	Label	Notes
1948?		The Dameron Band (Featuring Fats Navarro)	Blue Note	
1949?	1972	Anthropology	Spotlite	
1949?		Cool Boppin'		
1949	1977	The Miles Davis/Tadd Dameron Quintet In Paris Festival International De Jazz May, 1949	Columbia	With Miles Davis (trumpet), James Moody (tenor saxophone), Barney Spieler (bass), Kenny Clarke (drums)
1953	1953	A Study in Dameronia	Prestige	With Clifford Brown (trumpet), Benny Golson (tenor sax), Idrees Sulieman (trumpet), Gigi Gryce (alto sax), Herb Mullins (trombone), Oscar Estell (baritone sax), Percy Heath (bass), Philly Joe Jones (drums); most tracks also issued on Memorial
1956	1956	Fontainebleau	Prestige	With Kenny Dorham (trumpet), Henry Coker (trombone), Cecil Payne (baritone sax), Sahib Shihab (alto sax), Joe Alexander tenor sax), John Simmons (bass), Shadow Wilson (drums)
1956	1957	Mating Call	Prestige	Quartet, with John Coltrane (tenor sax), John Simmons (bass), Philly Joe Jones (drums)
1962	1962	The Magic Touch	Riverside	With Clark Terry, Ernie Royal Charlie Shavers and Joe Wilder (trumpet), Jimmy Cleveland and Britt Woodman (trombone), Julius Watkins (French horn), Jerry Dodgion and Leo Wright (alto sax, flute), Jerome Richardson (tenor sax, flute), Johnny Griffin (tenor sax), Tate Houston (baritone sax), Bill Evans (piano), Ron Carter and George Duvivier (bass), Philly Joe Jones (drums); Barbara Winfield (vocals) added on two tracks
	1962	The Tadd Dameron Band	Jazzland	

=== As sideman ===
With John Coltrane

- John Coltrane Plays for Lovers (Prestige, 1966)
- Trane's Blues (Giants of Jazz, 1990)

With Miles Davis

- At Birdland (Durium, 1976)
- The Early Days Vol. 1 (Giants of Jazz, 1985)
- Birdland Days (Fresh Sound, 1990)

With Dexter Gordon

- New Trends of Jazz Volume 3 (Savoy, 1952)
- Long Tall Dexter (Savoy, 1976)
- Dexter Rides Again (Savoy, 1985)

With Fats Navarro

- Memorial Album (Blue Note, 1951)
- New Trends of Jazz Vol. 5 (Savoy, 1952)
- Fats Bud-Klook-Sonny-Kinney (Savoy, 1955)
- Fats Navarro Memorial Theodore "Fats" Navarro 1923–1950 Volume I (London, 1956)
- The Fabulous Fats Navarro, Vol. 1 (Blue Note, 1957)
- The Fabulous Fats Navarro, Vol. 2 (Blue Note, 1957)
- Fats Navarro Featured with the Tadd Dameron Quintet (Jazzland, 1961)
- Fats Navarro Memorial Volume 1 (CBS, 1964)
- Prime Source (Blue Note, 1975)
- Fat Girl (Savoy, 1977)
- Featured with the Tadd Dameron Band (Milestone, 1977)
- At Royal Roost Volume 1 (Jazz View, 1991)
- Fats Blows 1946–1949 (Giants of Jazz, 1991)
- Royal Roost Sessions 1948 (Fresh Sound, 1991)

With Charlie Parker

- Bird Lives (Continental, 1962)
- Pensive Bird (Ember, 1969)
- Broadcast Performances Vol. 2 (ESP Disk, 1973)
