= The Fabulous Fats Navarro, Vol. 2 =

Studio album by Fats Navarro, released 1957

Studio album by Fats Navarro
- Released: 1957
- Recorded: September 13, 1948; October 11, 1948; August 9, 1949
- Genre: Bebop
- Length: 35:27
- Label: Blue Note

Fats Navarro chronology
The Fabulous Fats Navarro, Vol. 1 (1957)	The Fabulous Fats Navarro, Vol. 2 (1957)	One Night in Birdland (1977)

The Fabulous Fats Navarro, Vol. 2 is a studio album by Fats Navarro and released posthumously by Blue Note Records. Personnel varied through the studio sessions that made up the album but among the most notable were Wardell Gray, Bud Powell, and Howard McGhee.

== Reception ==
Professional ratings
Review scores
Source	Rating
AllMusic	4.5/5 stars
The Encyclopedia of Popular Music	4/5 stars
The Penguin Guide to Jazz	4/4 stars

According to jazz critic Stephen Cook, "Navarro runs the gamut here, turning in both high-flying solos and gracefully cool statements." He noted that the track listing and personnel of the album had varied between releases.

The authors of The Penguin Guide to Jazz Recordings awarded the album a full 4 stars, calling it and its companion volume "one of the peaks of the bebop movement and one of the essential modern-jazz records."

Critic John Fordham described the two volumes as "essential Navarro, and essential bebop generally, featuring a string of dazzling themes illuminated by the trumpeter's glowing tone."

Author Tom Piazza stated that the albums "show instantly what set Dameron's work apart," and commented: "Among bebop dates, these were really something special, full of carefully worked-out ensembles, introductions, and codas, yet still with plenty of stretching room for the soloists."

Saxophonist and writer Benny Green noted Dameron's "ravishing tone" and "precise delivery," and called the recordings "a reminder of the grace of one of the earliest modern pioneers, a grace that was precocious because in the 1940s modernists had still not formulated their own conventions."

== Track listing ==
All compositions by Tadd Dameron unless otherwise stated

1. "Lady Bird" (alternate take) – 2:53
2. "Lady Bird" – 2:52
3. "Jahbero" (alternate take) – 3:03
4. "Jahbero" – 2:56
5. "Symphonette" (alternate take) – 3:07
6. "Symphonette" – 3:09
7. "Double Talk" (alternate take) (Howard McGhee, Navarro) – 5:22
8. "Bouncing With Bud" (alternate take) (Bud Powell) – 3:07
9. "Dance Of The Infidels" (alternate take) (Powell) – 2:52
10. "The Skunk" (alternate take) (McGhee, Navarro) – 2:59
11. "Boperation" (McGhee, Navarro) – 3:07

== Personnel ==
- Fats Navarro – trumpet
- Howard McGhee – trumpet (7, 10–11)
- Ernie Henry – alto saxophone (7, 10–11)
- Allen Eager – tenor saxophone (1–6)
- Wardell Gray – tenor saxophone (1–6)
- Sonny Rollins – tenor saxophone (8–9)
- Milt Jackson – vibraphone, piano (7, 10–11)
- Bud Powell – piano (8–9)
- Tadd Dameron – piano (1–6)
- Curley Russell – bass (1–7, 10–11)
- Tommy Potter – bass (8–9)
- Kenny Clarke – drums (1–7, 10–11)
- Roy Haynes – drums (8–9)
- Chino Pozo – bongos (3–4)
