= The Fabulous Fats Navarro, Vol. 1 =

Studio album by Fats Navarro
- Released: 1957
- Recorded: September 26, 1947; October 11, 1948; August 9, 1949
- Genre: Bebop
- Length: 36:07
- Label: Blue Note

Fats Navarro chronology
Fats Bud-Klook-Sonny-Kinney (1955)	The Fabulous Fats Navarro, Vol. 1 (1957)	The Fabulous Fats Navarro, Vol. 2 (1957)

The Fabulous Fats Navarro, Vol. 1 is a studio album by Fats Navarro and released posthumously by Blue Note Records. Material for the album came from record dates with a variety of musicians including Tadd Dameron, Ernie Henry, Wardell Gray, Charlie Rouse, and Bud Powell. The music was recorded on three sessions, with one coming from 1947, 1948, and 1949 respectively.

== Reception ==
Professional ratings
Review scores
Source	Rating
AllMusic	4.5/5 stars
The Encyclopedia of Popular Music	4/5 stars
The Penguin Guide to Jazz	👑

Jazz critic Stephen Cook described Navarro as a "fluid and inventive bebop trumpeter" and considered the album "an essential title for jazz enthusiasts."

The authors of The Penguin Guide to Jazz Recordings awarded the album a full 4 stars and a "crown," calling it and its companion volume "one of the peaks of the bebop movement and one of the essential modern-jazz records."

Critic John Fordham described the two volumes as "essential Navarro, and essential bebop generally, featuring a string of dazzling themes illuminated by the trumpeter's glowing tone."

Author Tom Piazza stated that the albums "show instantly what set Dameron's work apart," and commented: "Among bebop dates, these were really something special, full of carefully worked-out ensembles, introductions, and codas, yet still with plenty of stretching room for the soloists."

Saxophonist and writer Benny Green noted Dameron's "ravishing tone" and "precise delivery," and called the recordings "a reminder of the grace of one of the earliest modern pioneers, a grace that was precocious because in the 1940s modernists had still not formulated their own conventions."

== Track listing ==
All compositions by Tadd Dameron unless otherwise stated

1. "Our Delight" (alternate take) – 3:09
2. "Our Delight" – 3:00
3. "The Squirrel" (alternate take) – 3:22
4. "The Squirrel" – 3:01
5. "The Chase" (alternate take) – 2:59
6. "The Chase" – 2:46
7. "Wail" (alternate take) (Bud Powell) – 2:44
8. "Bouncing With Bud" (alternate take) (Powell) – 3:16
9. "Double Talk" (Howard McGhee, Navarro) – 5:35
10. "Dameronia" (alternate take) – 3:15
11. "Dameronia" – 3:00

== Personnel ==
- Fats Navarro – trumpet
- Howard McGhee – trumpet (9)
- Ernie Henry – alto saxophone
- Charlie Rouse – tenor saxophone (1–6, 10–11)
- Sonny Rollins – tenor saxophone (7–8)
- Milt Jackson – vibraphone, piano (9)
- Bud Powell – piano (7–8)
- Tadd Dameron – piano (1–6, 10–11)
- Curley Russell – bass (9)
- Nelson Boyd – bass (1–6, 10–11)
- Tommy Potter – bass (7–8)
- Kenny Clarke – drums (9)
- Roy Haynes – drums (7–8)
- Shadow Wilson – drums (1–6, 10–11)
