= Fats Bud-Klook-Sonny-Kinney =

Studio album by Fats Navarro
- Released: 1955
- Recorded: September 6, 1946; October 28, 1947
- Genre: Bebop
- Length: 44:47
- Label: Savoy

Fats Navarro chronology
Modern Jazz Trumpets (1951)	Fats Bud-Klook-Sonny-Kinney (1955)	The Fabulous Fats Navarro, Vol. 1 (1957)

Fats Bud-Klook-Sonny-Kinney, also titled in some releases as Memorial, is an album by Fats Navarro for Savoy Records that was released posthumously.

== Reception ==
Jazz critic Stephen Cook described the album as "essential" and described it as "one of several incredible sessions Navarro was able to produce in just over a two-year period during the late '40s."

Professional ratings
Review scores
Source	Rating
Allmusic	4.5/5 stars

== Track listing ==
All compositions by Sonny Stitt unless otherwise stated

1. "Boppin' a Riff" – 5:31
2. "Fat Boy" (Navarro) – 5:41
3. "Be-Bop Carol" (Tadd Dameron) – 2:56
4. "Gone With the Wind" (Herb Magidson, Allie Wrubel) – 3:08
5. "Serenade to a Square" (Bud Powell) – 2:33
6. "Good Kick" – 2:36
7. "Everything's Cool" – 5:48
8. "Webb City" (Powell) – 5:36
9. "Tadd Walk" (Dameron) – 2:50
10. "That Someone Must Be You" (Earl Hardy) – 2:59
11. "Seven Up" – 2:27
12. "Blues in Bebop" (Kenny Dorham) – 2:42

== Personnel ==
- Fats Navarro – trumpet
- Kenny Dorham – trumpet
- Sonny Stitt – alto saxophone
- Ernie Henry – alto saxophone
- Morris Lane – tenor saxophone
- Eddie DeVerteuil – baritone saxophone
- Bud Powell – piano
- Tadd Dameron – piano
- Curley Russell – bass
- Al Hall – bass
- Kenny Clarke – drums
- Kay Penton – vocal
- Gil Fuller – arranger
