= Kids on the Slope =

Japanese manga series

- Final volume cover, featuring (from top) Sentarō Kawabuchi, Kaoru Nishimi, and Ritsuko Mukae

坂道のアポロン (Sakamichi no Aporon)
- Genre: Coming-of-age; Romance; Slice of life
- Manga
- Written by: Yuki Kodama
- Published by: Shogakukan
- Imprint: Flower Comics Alpha
- Magazine: Monthly Flowers
- Original run: 28 September 2007 – 28 July 2012
- Volumes: 10
- Anime television series
- Directed by: Shinichirō Watanabe
- Produced by: Noriko Ozaki; Daisuke Konaka
- Written by: Ayako Katō; Yūko Kakihara
- Music by: Yoko Kanno
- Studio: MAPPA; Tezuka Productions
- Licensed by: AUS: Hanabee; NA: Sentai Filmworks; UK: MVM Films (former); Anime Limited (current)
- Original network: Fuji TV (Noitamina)
- English network: NA: Anime Network, Neon Alley
- Original run: 12 April 2012 – 28 June 2012
- Episodes: 12
- Live-action film
- Directed by: Takahiro Miki
- Written by: Izumi Takahashi
- Music by: Masato Suzuki
- Studio: Asmik Ace; C&I Entertainment
- Released: 10 March 2018
- Runtime: 120 minutes
- icon

Kids on the Slope (Japanese: 坂道のアポロン, Hepburn: Sakamichi no Aporon; lit. "Apollo on the Slope") is a Japanese manga series written and illustrated by Yuki Kodama. It was originally serialized in Shogakukan's josei manga magazine Monthly Flowers from 2007 to 2012, with its chapters compiled into 10 tankōbon volumes. The series follows Kaoru Nishimi, an introverted high school student who discovers jazz music through his friendship with his delinquent classmate Sentarō Kawabuchi.

The series has been adapted twice: as a television anime series in 2012, and as a live-action film directed by Takahiro Miki in 2018. The anime adaptation is directed by Shinichirō Watanabe with music by Yoko Kanno, making it the third collaboration between Watanabe and Kanno following Macross Plus (1994–1995) and Cowboy Bebop (1998). The series was produced by MAPPA and Tezuka Productions, and aired on Fuji TV's Noitamina programming block. In North America, the series was licensed by Sentai Filmworks and aired on the streaming service Crunchyroll, which simulcast the series during its original broadcast run.

The anime adaption of Kids on the Slope was widely acclaimed, with praise given to its direction, narrative, and music. Critics explored Kids on the Slope's depiction of Catholicism in Japan, its themes of male friendship and subtextual homoeroticism, and its relation to Watanabe's broader canon of works in their analysis of the series. Multiple outlets listed Kids on the Slope as among the best anime of the 2010s.

== Synopsis ==
Kaoru Nishimi is an intelligent, introverted first-year high school student from a wealthy family who moves to different cities frequently as a result of his father's career. Consequently, he has never made lasting friendships. In the summer of 1966, he relocates from Yokosuka, Kanagawa to Sasebo, Nagasaki to live with his extended family. On his first day of school he encounters Sentarō Kawabuchi, a delinquent student feared by his classmates. Sentarō's love of jazz music inspires Kaoru to study the genre, and the two boys begin to develop a close friendship through jazz sessions at a record shop owned by the family of Ritsuko Mukae, a classmate. The slice of life series follows Kaoru, Sentarō, and Ritsuko over the course of their three years of high school, and the relationships that develop among and between them.

== Characters ==
=== Primary characters ===
Kaoru Nishimi (西見薫, Nishimi Kaoru)
Portrayed by: Ryōhei Kimura (Japanese), Takashi Matsunaga (music performance and motion capture), Chris Patton (English), Yuri Chinen (live-action film)
A high school student from a wealthy family who moves to his uncle's home in Kyushu in the summer of 1966. Due to his introversion and the frequency with which he moves because of his father's career, he has never developed lasting friendships. Kaoru is a skilled pianist familiar with classical music, though his friendship with Sentarō Kawabuchi inspires him to begin performing jazz. He possesses romantic feelings for his classmate Ritsuko Mukae, which are initially unrequited due to her feelings for Sentarō.
Sentarō Kawabuchi (川渕 千太郎, Kawabuchi Sentarō)
Portrayed by: Yoshimasa Hosoya (Japanese), Shun Ishiwaka (music performance and motion capture), Andrew Love (English), Taishi Nakagawa (live-action film)
The child of an American serviceman and a Japanese mother, Sentarō was orphaned at a young age and faced discrimination. He is outwardly an aggressive delinquent, but is a kind and caring person to his friends, and a loving brother to his multiple adopted siblings. He is a skilled jazz drummer, and grows close to Kaoru by sharing his love of jazz with him. He is Catholic, indicated by the rosary he wears around his neck at all times, and ends the series as a priest-in-training.
Ritsuko Mukae (迎 律子, Mukae Ritsuko)
Portrayed by: Yūka Nanri (Japanese), Rebekah Stevens (English), Nana Komatsu (live-action film)
A classmate of Kaoru and Sentarō, and longtime friend of the latter. Her family owns a record store that serves as a practice space for Kaoru and Sentarō. Like Sentarō, she is Catholic, and begins the series with romantic feelings for him. As the series progresses, her feelings shift from Sentarō to Kaoru.

=== Supporting characters ===
Yurika Fukahori (深堀百合香, Fukahori Yurika)
Portrayed by: Aya Endō (Japanese), Maggie Flecknoe (English), Erina Mano (live-action film)
A strong-willed high school student and member of the art club. She becomes acquainted with Sentarō by chance after he intervenes when she is harassed by a group of men; he falls in love with her, though she ultimately develops feelings for Junichi. She and Junichi eventually wed and start a family together.
Junichi Katsuragi (桂木淳一, Katsuragi Junichi)
Portrayed by: Junichi Suwabe (Japanese), David Matranga (English), Dean Fujioka (live-action film)
A longtime friend of the Kawabuchi and Mukae families who plays trumpet. Junichi is idolized by Sentarō, whom he sees as akin to an older brother. While attending university in Tokyo he becomes involved in the Zenkyoto student protest movement, and later drops out of school and is disowned by his family. He marries Yurika, and they raise a family together.
Tsutomu Mukae (迎 勉, Mukae Tsutomu)
Portrayed by: Zenki Kitajima (Japanese), David Wald (English), Nakamura Baijaku II (live-action film)
Ritsuko's father, and the owner of the record shop where Sentarō and Kaoru play jazz. He plays double bass.
Seiji Matsuoka (松岡星児, Matsuoka Seiji)
Portrayed by: Nobuhiko Okamoto (Japanese), Blake Shepard (English), Hokuto Matsumura (live-action film)
A member of the art club who dreams of becoming a famous singer to support his family. He asks Sentarō to play drums at the school festival with his band, to Kaoru's chagrin.
Shigetora Maruo (丸尾 重虎, Maruo Shigetora)
Portrayed by: Ayumu Murase (Japanese), Greg Ayres (English)
A member of the radio club. A train enthusiast who plays guitar.
Mariko (まり子)
Portrayed by: Amina Satō (Japanese), Cynthia Martinez (English)
Kaoru's cousin. Has a somewhat spoiled and bratty personality.

== Media ==
=== Manga ===
Kids on the Slope, written and illustrated by Yuki Kodama, was serialized by Shogakukan in the josei manga anthology Monthly Flowers from 28 September 2007 to 28 January 2012. Kids on the Slope: Bonus Track, a spin-off series that was released immediately following the conclusion of the manga series, was serialized in the same magazine from 28 March to 28 July 2012. In Japan, the series was collected into 10 tankōbon volumes published by Shogakukan from 25 April 2008 to 9 November 2012. The first nine tankōbon volumes consist of the original 90 chapter series, with Bonus Track being published as its own unnumbered volume. Internationally, the series has been licensed in French, Spanish, Italian, and Taiwanese Mandarin.

==== Volumes ====
No.	Release date	ISBN
1	25 April 2008	9784091316707
2	10 November 2008	9784091321749
3	10 March 2009	9784091321749
4	10 August 2009	9784091326263
5	8 January 2010	9784091330192
6	10 June 2010	9784091331984
7	10 February 2011	9784091336507
8	10 November 2011	9784091341150
9	26 April 2012	9784091344656
BT	9 November 2012	9784091347930

=== Anime ===
==== Development ====
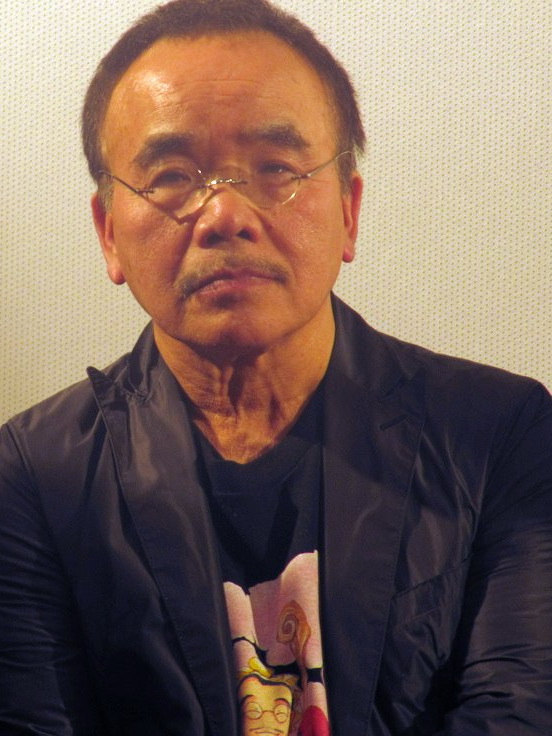
Masao Maruyama produced the anime adaptation of Kids on the Slope.

An anime adaptation of Kids on the Slope produced by MAPPA in association with Tezuka Productions was released in 2012. It was the first anime series produced by MAPPA, which was founded by Masao Maruyama in 2011 after his departure from the studio Madhouse. Maruyama co-founded Madhouse in 1972, and approached Shinichirō Watanabe to direct Kids on the Slope on the basis of their previous work at Madhouse together. Watanabe spent the three years prior to the release of Kids on the Slope developing projects for Madhouse that ultimately stalled in planning phases or were cancelled, leading Maruyama to offer Watanabe the series to direct "as something to do." The series was heralded as a "triumphant return to the mainstream" for Watanabe following a seven-year hiatus from directing anime, which spanned from the conclusion of his previous series Samurai Champloo in 2005.

Kids on the Slope was Watanabe's first anime series adapted from an existing work, rather than based on an original concept. Maruyama stated that Watanabe initially resisted the prospect of creating an adaptation and expressed concerns over a lack of creative freedom, but agreed after learning that the series was about jazz (music frequently forms a core element of Watanabe's works), and after Kids on the Slope network Fuji TV agreed to greenlight his subsequent anime series Terror in Resonance. After reading the original Kids on the Slope manga, Watanabe noted that while jazz music forms the basis of the story, he was interested in its approach to plot and characterization, particularly "the kind of way that it portrays emotional distance." Upon learning that Watanabe was developing a new anime series, composer Yoko Kanno asked to be involved in its production. While Kanno has stated that she is not a fan of jazz music, she sought to be involved in Watanabe's next project after their previous collaborations on Macross Plus and Cowboy Bebop.

==== Production ====
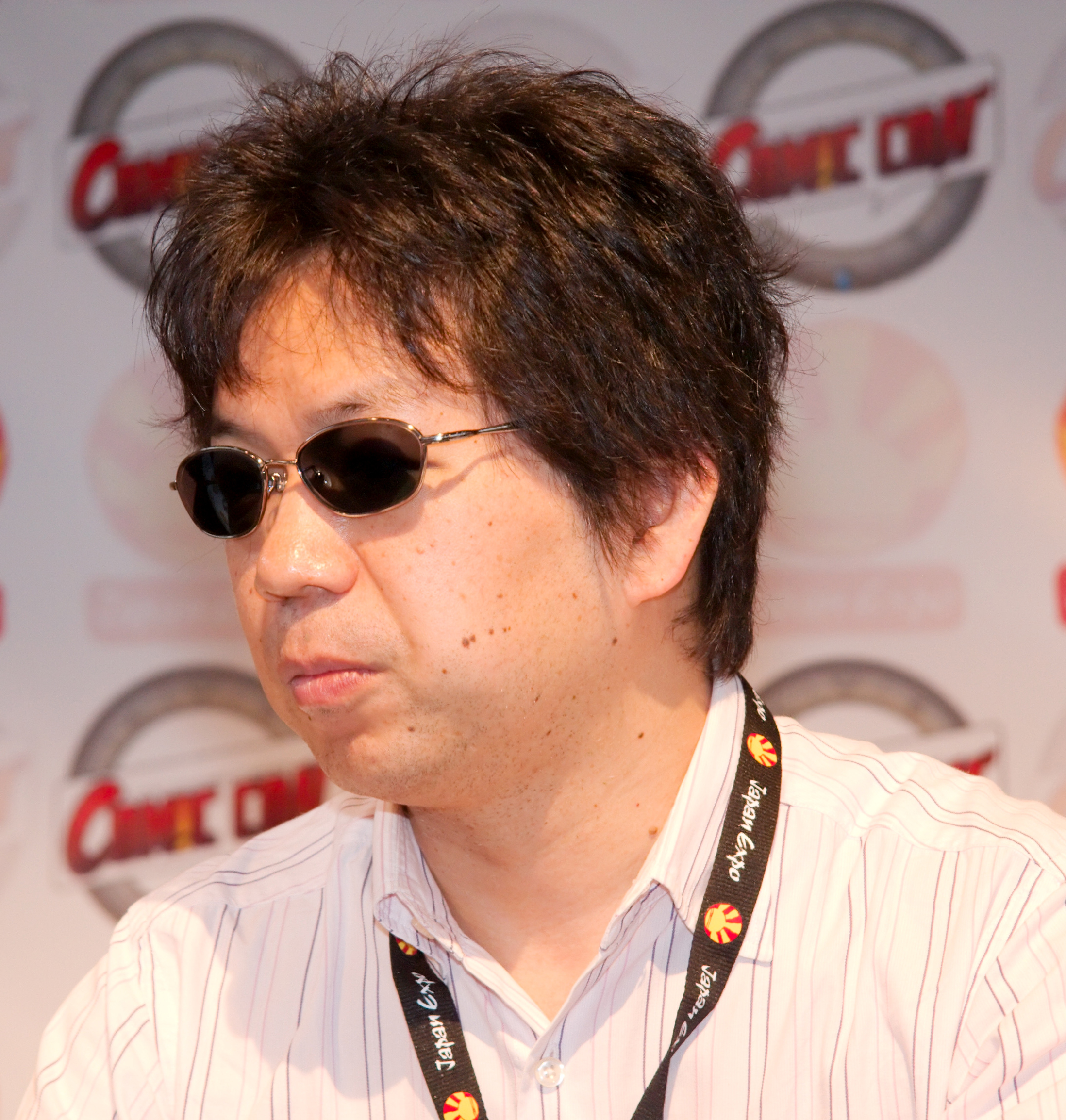
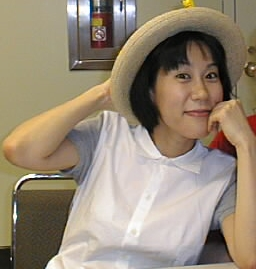
The anime adaptation of Kids on the Slope is the third collaboration between director Shinichirō Watanabe (left) and composer Yoko Kanno (right), following Macross Plus and Cowboy Bebop.

The primary production staff for Kids on the Slope is composed of Watanabe as director, Kanno as composer, Nobuteru Yūki as character designer, Yoshimitsu Yamashita as chief animation director, and Ayako Katō and Yūko Kakihara as scriptwriters. The series was Watanabe's first single cour series; on adapting the series with a compressed number of episodes, Watanabe noted that a manga series of Kids on the Slope's length would typically have been adapted as 15 or 16 episodes, "so trying to fit it into 12 episodes necessitated a bit of rushing."

Maruyama estimates that "about half" of the production time and budget for the series went towards creating its musical performance scenes. Though Maruyama had experience depicting musical performances in animation through his work on Beck: Mongolian Chop Squad and Forest of Piano at Madhouse, he found that "jazz performance turned out to be a huge challenge." Despite pressure to render the performance scenes as computer-generated imagery to reduce time and costs, Watanabe rendered these scenes using hand-drawn animation by utilizing motion capture: real-life musicians were filmed performing the scene's music from multiple angles, which was then edited into a single "scene" that animators used as photo reference.

Watanabe and Kanno found jazz artists to perform the series' soundtrack and motion capture by searching videos on YouTube. They sought young artists who were "rough and therefore charming," with Watanabe noting that it "would be terrible if we asked veteran studio musicians to perform it in a "young style'." Pianist Takashi Matsunaga and drummer Shun Ishiwaka were cast to record the music and motion capture for Kaoru and Sentarō, respectively.

==== Music ====
The series' soundtrack consists of an original score and cover versions of existing jazz songs. Each episode of the series is named after a jazz standard, with the titles, lyrics, and/or music of each song typically having significance with regards to the events of the episode. As majority of the series' music consists of diegetic jazz performance, its score is minimal, with Kanno noting that Kids on the Slope is a "work built on the jazz part alone, and we'd just need music for atmosphere." While Kanno was initially told by Watanabe that she would only have to produce the score for the series, she ultimately produced both its score and jazz performances. In preparation for the series, Kanno visited jazz clubs and researched recording techniques of the 1950s and 1960s; for Kaoru and Sentarō's performance scenes, Kanno elected to record both drums and piano simultaneously (rather than record the instruments separately and later arrange them digitally, as is standard in modern music production) to emulate these recording techniques. Kanno collaborated with disc jockeys DJ Mitsu The Beats and Mabanua on the series' score, stating that she sought their involvement not to bring a contemporary "DJ sound" to the 1960s setting, but to instead capture a sense of "youth" in the music.

The series uses two pieces of theme music: its opening theme "Sakamichi no Melody" is written and performed by Yuki, while its closing theme "Altair" is written and performed by Motohiro Hata. Due to production delays, the opening sequence was animated before its music was produced; delays also forced the opening sequence to be produced by a staff that was entirely separate from the main series animation staff, a move Maruyama noted as "not something you see with anime very often."

==== Release ====
The adaptation was announced in the December 2011 issue of Monthly Flowers. Kōji Yamamoto, the producer of Fuji TV's Noitamina programming block, confirmed that same month that the series would air on the network beginning in April. The first trailer for the series was released in January 2012, alongside an announcement of the series' production staff. The twelve-episode series aired on Noitamina from 12 April to 28 June 2012.

In English-language markets, the series is licensed by Sentai Filmworks and aired on the streaming service Crunchyroll, which simulcast the series during its original broadcast run. An English language dubbed version of the series was also produced by Sentai Filmworks; episodes aired on Anime Network and Hulu one month after streaming on Crunchyroll. Sentai Filmworks additionally produced the North American home video release of Kids on the Slope, which was released on Blu-ray and DVD on 7 May 2013. In 2014, the series aired on Viz Media's now-defunct streaming service Neon Alley. The Blu-ray was re-released on 13 April 2021. The series was first released in the United Kingdom and Ireland by MVM Films on 24 June 2013. In Australia, Hanabee released the series on 7 August 2013. Anime Limited re-released the series in the United Kingdom and Ireland with a collector's edition on 18 December 2023 and a standard edition on 17 June 2024.

=== Live-action film ===
A live-action film adaptation of Kids on the Slope was announced in the June 2017 issue of Monthly Flowers published on 27 April 2017. Kids on the Slope publisher Shogakukan confirmed the adaptation the following day, along with an announcement of the film's cast and primary production staff. The film is directed by Takahiro Miki with a screenplay by Izumi Takahashi, and stars Yuri Chinen as Kaoru, Taishi Nakagawa as Sentarō, and Nana Komatsu as Ritsuko. The actors underwent speech and music training in advance of production, with Chinen and Nakagawa studying piano and drums, respectively, and Nakagawa and Komatsu trained to speak in a Sasebo dialect; Dean Fujioka, who portrays Junichi, was trained to play the trumpet. The trailer for the film was released on 15 October 2017, with the film itself released on 10 March 2018.

=== Other media ===
Several soundtrack albums collecting music from the series have been published. In 2009, EMI Music Japan published Kids on the Slope Original Soundtrack, a compilation album collecting songs referenced in the manga series. The album is composed of both licensed original recordings and cover versions by the Japanese jazz quartet Quasimode. In 2012, Epic Records Japan published the identically titled Kids on the Slope Original Soundtrack, which collects songs used in the anime adaption of the series and Yoko Kanno's original score; an expanded edition of the soundtrack, Kids on the Slope Original Soundtrack: Plus More & Rare, was published that same year. In 2018, Ariola Japan published Kids on the Slope Soundtrack & Jazz Music Collection, which collects the soundtrack of the live-action film adaptation of the series.

A Kids on the Slope weekly internet radio series aired on Hibiki Radio from 10 April to 3 July 2012. The series was hosted by Kaoru voice actor Ryōhei Kimura, and featured voice actors from the anime series as guests.

== Themes and analysis ==
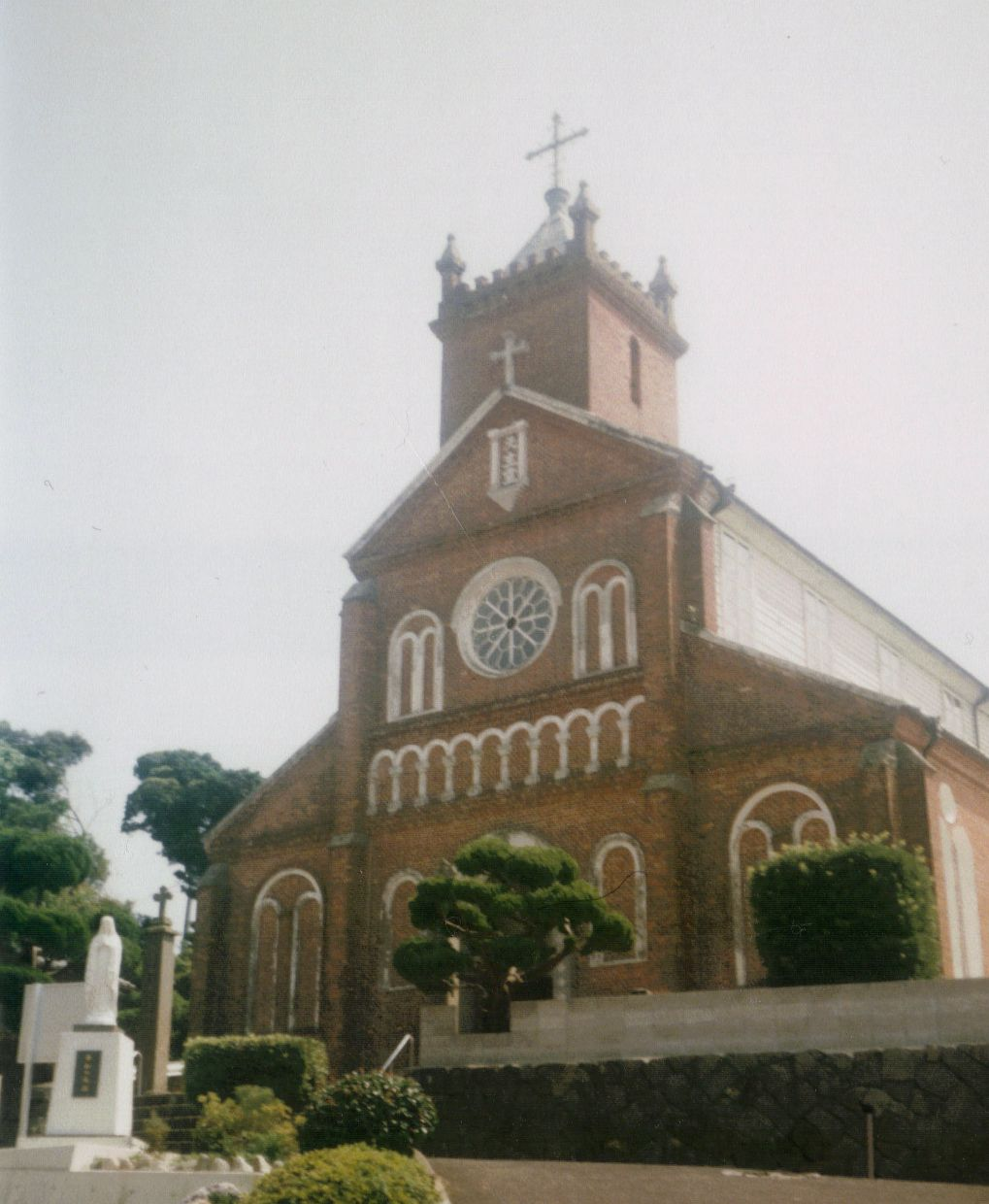
Kuroshima Church on the Kujūku Islands near Sasebo, where the final scene of the series occurs.

Series creator Yuki Kodama based Kids on the Slope on her own experience of growing up in Sasebo, Nagasaki, where the series is set. Jazz figured heavily in Sasebo's music scene beginning in the 1920s and 1930s; the city houses a major naval base for the Japan Maritime Self-Defense Force (then the Imperial Japanese Navy), which attracted nightclubs and cabarets to the area. Several real-life locations in and around Sasebo appear in Kids on the Slope, notably the Megane-iwa (lit. "Spectacles Rock"), and the Kuroshima Catholic church on the Kujūku Islands.

In his book Holy Anime! Japan's View of Christianity, writer Patrick Drazen remarks on the series' depiction of Catholicism in Japan, citing Kids on the Slope as an example of how "in the Japanese scheme of things, religion can be a factor of geography and even genetics, and [is] not exclusively a profession of faith." In particular, Drazen notes how the stigmatization Sentarō faces because of his hāfu racial identity is compounded by his Catholic religious identity. Drazen further identifies Kids on the Slope as an example of a work that juxtaposes Catholicism and Western popular music, comparing it to media such as "Dominique" by The Singing Nun and the Sister Act series of films.

Multiple critics noted a homoerotic dimension to Kaoru and Sentarō's canonically platonic friendship. Jacob Parker-Dalton of Otaquest cites the series' homoerotic subtext as an example of the influence of the boys' love genre (male-male romance) on the josei demographic, noting how Sentarō and Kaoru conform to character archetypes found in the BL genre. Writer Madeline Ashby argues that though its homoerotic content is rendered as subtext, Kids on the Slope represents Watanabe's first attempt to engage seriously with LGBT subject material in his work, after previously depicting LGBT characters in passing or as the punchlines for jokes. Parker-Dalton notes that Watanabe's works subsequent to Kids on the Slope similarly feature serious portrayals of LGBT characters and themes, as seen in the bishōnen-style character designs of Terror in Resonance and the presence of multiple LGBT characters in Carole & Tuesday.

Kids on the Slope was also discussed by critics in relation to Watanabe's broader canon of works, with Parker-Dalton identifying the series as a "watershed" moment for Watanabe's career representing "the final evolution of the director’s lifelong obsession with music." Ashby notes how the series' theme of male friendship is one that recurs in Watanabe's works, which depict "unlikely pairs of men (or boys) who are either thrown together by circumstance or are drawn together by their mutual histories." She argues that Kids on the Slope represents metatextual commentary by Watanabe on his previous works Cowboy Bebop and Samurai Champloo, as he uses design elements, setting, and characterization to "evoke [his] other works while keeping each story completely independent."

== Reception ==
The manga was the top-ranked manga for women in the 2009 edition of Takarajimasha's annual Kono Manga ga Sugoi! rankings and won the 57th Shogakukan Manga Award in 2012 for general manga. Reviewing the first volume of the series for The Asahi Shimbun, critic Shigeko Matsuo praised Kodama's characterization, but criticized its love triangle plot conceit.

The anime adaptation of Kids on the Slope was acclaimed by critics, and was listed as among the best anime of 2012 by Anime News Network, among the best anime of the 2010s by IGN, Crunchyroll, and Thrillist, and among the best anime of all time by Paste. In 2013, Yoko Kanno won Best Music at the Tokyo Anime Awards for her work on Kids on the Slope and Aquarion Evol. Theron Martin reviewed the series positively for Anime News Network, noting that while Kids on the Slope is "more pedestrian" than Watanabe and Kanno's previous collaborations, he offered praise for its character development, music, and visual style. Otaku USA commended "the driving emotion of the music, the animation thereof, and incredibly well-written tale of growing up," calling Watanabe's direction and Kanno's music production as "a perfect balance for the series." In his review of the series for IndieWire, Charles Solomon noted that the series showcases Watanabe's "versatility as a director and his ability to create characters with depth and believability." Kirk Hamilton of Kotaku wrote that while the series' "dreamy, romantic vibe" may be off-putting to viewers who discovered Watanabe through his work on Cowboy Bebop, but argued that "to dismiss Kids on the Slope would be a huge mistake. Like Cowboy Bebop, Kids is a thing of visual and aural beauty, a celebration of art that lives in its smallest details." Nicole MacLean of THEM Anime similarly concurred that while the series "moves slowly and thus may not gain widespread appeal," its "poignancy and its adept choice of viewpoint as a reflective rather than purely nostalgic show ultimately win out over its mistakes."

The live-action film adaption of Kids on the Slope opened in eighth place at the Japanese box office. For his performance in the film, Taishi Nakagawa was nominated for Newcomer of the Year at the 42nd Japan Academy Film Prize awards in 2019.
