= Yuki Kodama =

Japanese manga artist

- Born: September 26
- Known for: Manga artist
- Awards: Shogakukan Manga Award

Yuki Kodama (Japanese: 小玉 ユキ, Hepburn: Kodama Yuki) is a Japanese manga artist. She is best known as the creator of the manga series Kids on the Slope, for which she won a Shogakukan Manga Award in 2011.

== Biography ==
Kodama was born on September 26 in Sasebo, Nagasaki Prefecture, Japan. She made her debut as a manga artist in 2000, with her series Zakuro (柘榴) published in Cutie Comic, a manga magazine published by Takarajimasha. Kodama would go on to publish several short-form works in Cutie Comic and Vanilla, a manga magazine published by Kodansha, in the early- to mid-2000s.

Kodama is best known for her manga series Kids on the Slope, which was serialized in the manga magazine Monthly Flowers from 2007 to 2012. The series, which Kodama based on her own experience growing up in Sasebo, was the top-ranked manga for women in the 2009 edition of Takarajimasha's annual Kono Manga ga Sugoi! rankings and won the 57th Shogakukan Manga Award in 2012 for general manga. In 2012, Kids on the Slope was adapted into a television anime series by director Shinichirō Watanabe.

Following Kids on the Slope, Kodama's wrote the manga series Tsukikage Baby, a drama focused on events in a traditional Japanese town from the perspectives of several different families. The series, which was published from 2013 to 2017 in Monthly Flowers; was one of the top ranked manga for women in the 2014 Kono Manga ga Sugoi! rankings. Her next series Chiisako no Niwa, also published in Monthly Flowers, ran from 2017 to 2018, and placed eighth in the 2019 Kono Manga ga Sugoi! rankings. Her most recent work, Ao no Hana, Utsuwa no Mori, has been published in Monthly Flowers since 2018.

== Works ==
=== Ongoing series ===
- Hagoromo Mishin (published in Monthly Flowers, 2007)
- Kids on the Slope (published in Monthly Flowers, 2007–2012)
- Tsukikage Baby (published in Monthly Flowers, 2013–2017)
- Chiisako no Niwa (published in Monthly Flowers, 2017–2018)
- Ao no Hana, Utsuwa no Mori (published in Monthly Flowers, 2018–2022)
- Wolf's Daughter: A Werewolf's Tale (published in Monthly Flowers, 2022 – present)

=== One-Shots ===
- Zakuro (published in Cutie Comic, 2000)
- Hōsekibako no Ningyo (published in Yawaraka Spirits, 2013)
- Underground (published in Zōkan Flowers, 2014)

== Awards ==
Year	Nominated work	Category	Award	Result	Notes	Ref.
2009	Kids on the Slope	Female Readers	Kono Manga ga Sugoi!	Won		
2011	Kids on the Slope	General	Shogakukan Manga Award	Won		
2014	Tsukikage Baby	Female Readers	Kono Manga ga Sugoi!	Third Place		
2019	Chiisako no Niwa	Female Readers	Kono Manga ga Sugoi!	Eighth Place		
2024	Wolf's Daughter: A Werewolf's Tale	Female Readers	Kono Manga ga Sugoi!	Eighth Place		
