= Takashi Matsunaga =

Japanese pianist and composer

- Born: Takashi Matsunaga (松永貴志, Matsunaga Takashi); 1987; Kobe, Japan
- Genres: Jazz
- Occupations: Musician, composer
- Instrument: Piano
- Website: takashimatsunaga.com

Takashi Matsunaga (松永貴志, Matsunaga Takashi; born 1987), sometimes known professionally as Takashi, is a Japanese jazz pianist and composer.

== Life and career ==
Matsunaga was born in 1987 and raised in Kobe. At the age of five he first played a piano and Hammond organ that his father had. His father also took him to jazz clubs. After winning an electric organ competition at the age of ten, Matsunaga took lessons from Tadao Kitano, who also taught Makoto Ozone. Matsunaga played his first concert as a professional when he was 15, appeared on television in 2002, then signed with Toshiba-EMI and released his first album the following year. As an 18-year-old, Matsunaga was promoted by Toshiba-EMI as "the youngest pro jazz pianist in Japan". Storm Zone, his 2004 release and debut album for Blue Note, contained only his original compositions. In 2012, he recorded for the anime Kids on the Slope, which narrates the story of two teenagers playing jazz, one piano the other drums.

== Playing style ==
"Matsunaga has a busy, almost frenetic, bop-based playing style, with dense clusters of notes and a profusion of riffs and melodic ideas." All About Jazz reviewers of his album Storm Zone identified numerous influences on his piano style; an AllMusic commentator wrote that "he had yet to mature into a distinctive individualist".

== Composing style ==
A reviewer for The New York Times commented that Matsunaga composes in "various stylistic idioms, including Latin-tinged numbers [...] gentle ballads [...] and swinging tours de force".

== Discography ==
An asterisk (*) after the year indicates that it is the year of release.

=== As leader/co-leader ===
Year recorded	Title	Label	Notes
2003*	Takashi	Toshiba-EMI	Trio
2003*	Moko Moko	Toshiba-EMI	
2003	Storm Zone	Blue Note	Trio, with Daiki Yasukagawa (bass), Junji Hirose (drums)
2004*	Today	Somethin' Else	
2006*	Inorganic Orange	Somethin' Else	Trio
2008*	Love Makes the Earth Float	Somethin' Else	Trio, with Hiroaki Mizutani and Daiki Yasukagawa (bass; separately), Akira Sotoyama and Junji Hirose (drums; separately)
2013*	Good News	Somethin' Else	

Main source:
