= Fat Girl (composition) =

1946 jazz composition by Fats Navarro

"Fat Girl" is a jazz composition by trumpet player Fats Navarro. It was first recorded by Navarro and his band in 1946. The tune's only vocals is the line "fat girl fat girl" which is announced at the beginning and end of the tune. The reason for the title may be because Fats Navarro's nickname was "fat girl" due to his weight, but it may have referred to an actually fat woman.
