= Quasimode (band) =

Japanese jazz band

- Origin: Tokyo, Japan
- Genres: Jazz
- Years active: 2002–2015
- Labels: Geneon Universal Entertainment
- Members: Yusuke Hirado; Takahiro "Mattz" Matsuoka; Kazuhiro Sunaga; Sohnosuke Imaizumi

Quasimode is a four-piece jazz band formed in Tokyo in 2002. Their sound is influenced by the cool jazz of the 1950s and 1960s.

They recorded their album The Land of Freedom with guest vocalist Carmen Lundy.

== Discography ==
- 2006 Oneself-likeness
- 2007 The Land of Freedom
- 2008 Straight to the Land of Freedom: Live at Liquidroom
- 2008 Sounds of Peace
- 2009 Mode of Blue
- 2009 Golden Works
- 2010 Daybreak
- 2011 Magic Ensemble
- 2012 Four Pieces: The Best Selection
- 2013 Soul Cookin'
- 2014 My Favorite Songs
